= List of amphibians and reptiles of Barbados =

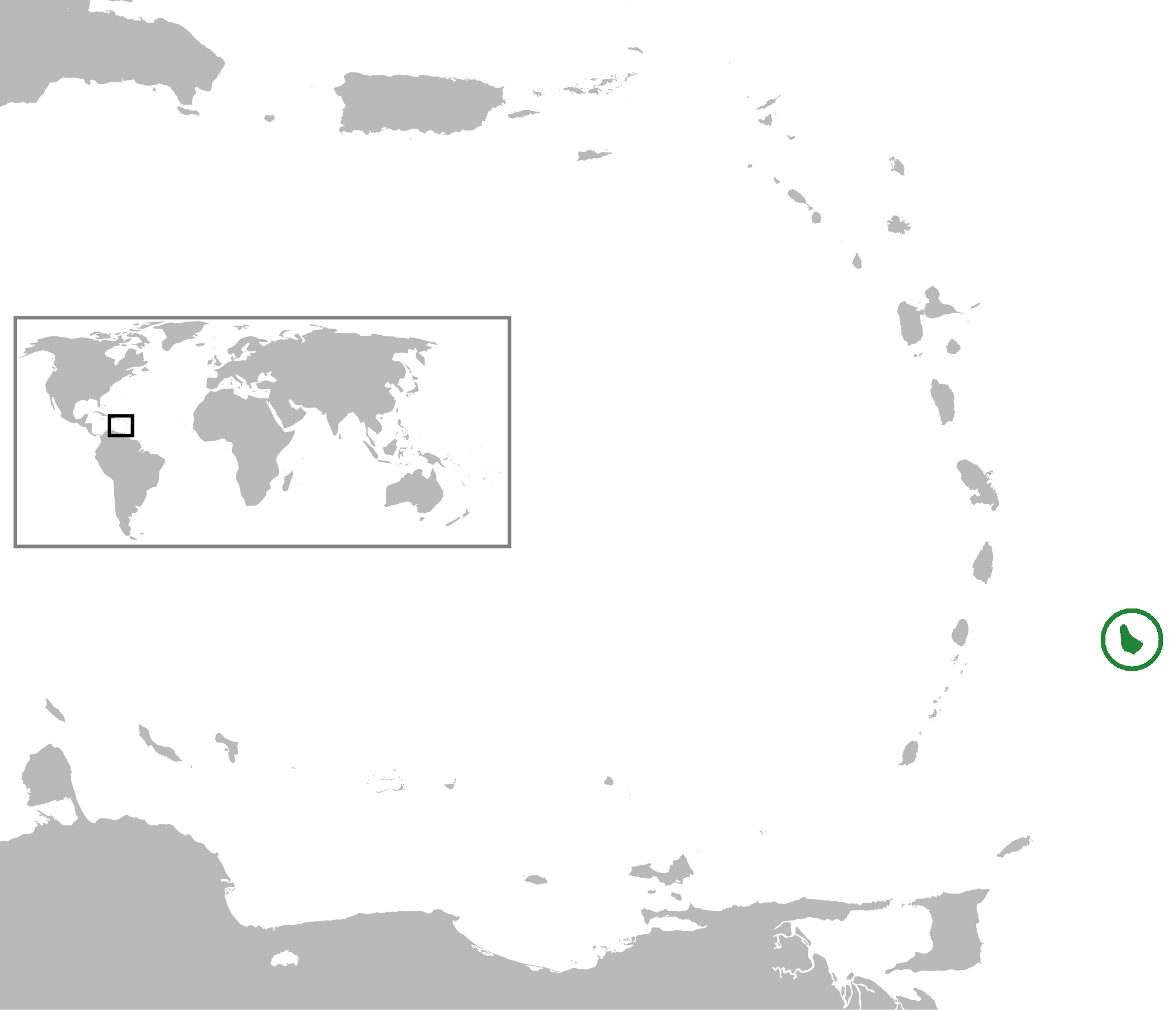
Location of Barbados in the Caribbean

This is a list of amphibians and reptiles found on Barbados, a Caribbean island-nation in the Lesser Antilles. Barbados is largely flat and has been intensively cultivated for over 300 years. This has left little natural vegetation on the island, leaving most species found there restricted to narrow habitats such as wooded gullies.

== Amphibians ==
There are two species of amphibians on Barbados, at least one of which was introduced.

=== Frogs (Anura) ===
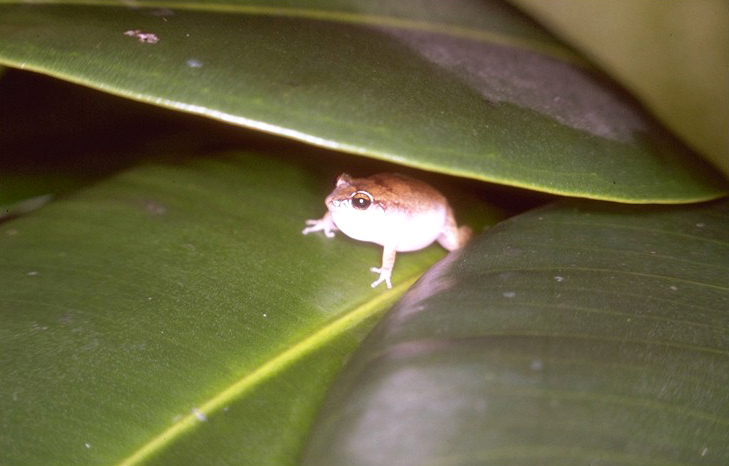
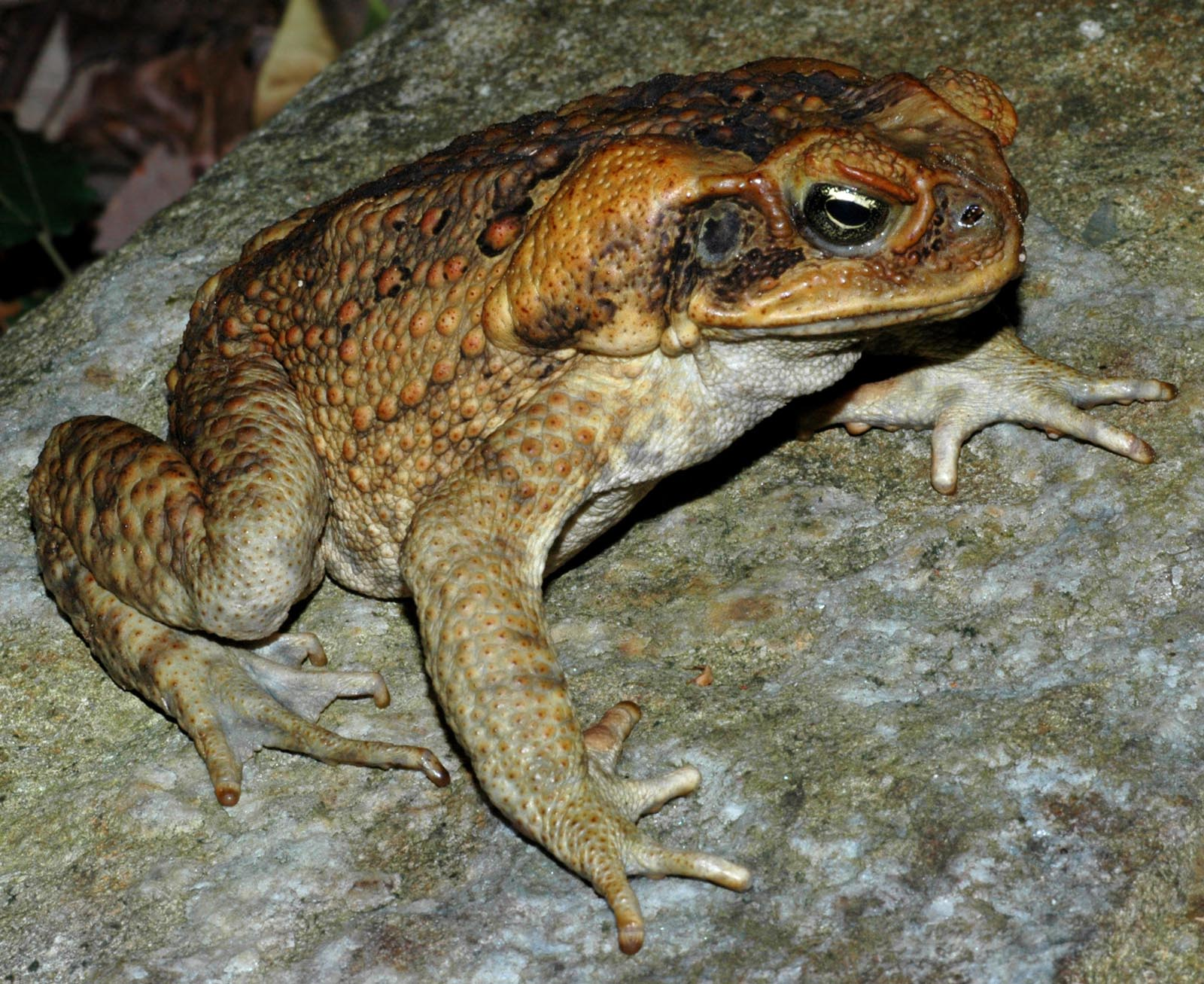
Tropical frogs (Leptodactylidae)
Species	Common name(s)	Notes	Image
Eleutherodactylus johnstonei	Lesser Antillean whistling frog, coqui Antillano, Johnstone's whistling frog	Least Concern. Widespread throughout the Lesser Antilles. Whether it was a native or introduced is a matter of controversy.
True toads (Bufonidae)
Species	Common name(s)	Notes	Image
Bufo marinus	Cane toad, giant neotropical toad, marine toad	Least Concern. Introduced in the 1830s to control insect pests of sugarcane. Abundant and widespread, particularly in rural areas.

== Reptiles ==
Including marine turtles and introduced species, there are 18 reptile species reported on Barbados, though two are possibly extinct. The Barbados leaf-toed gecko (Phyllodactylus pulcher) and the Barbados threadsnake (Leptotyphlops carlae) are endemic, as were the probably extinct Barbados racer (Liophis perfuscus) and Barbados skink (Alinea lanceolata). A fifth species, the Barbados anole (Anolis extremus), was endemic to Barbados but has been introduced to other islands.

=== Turtles (Testudines) ===
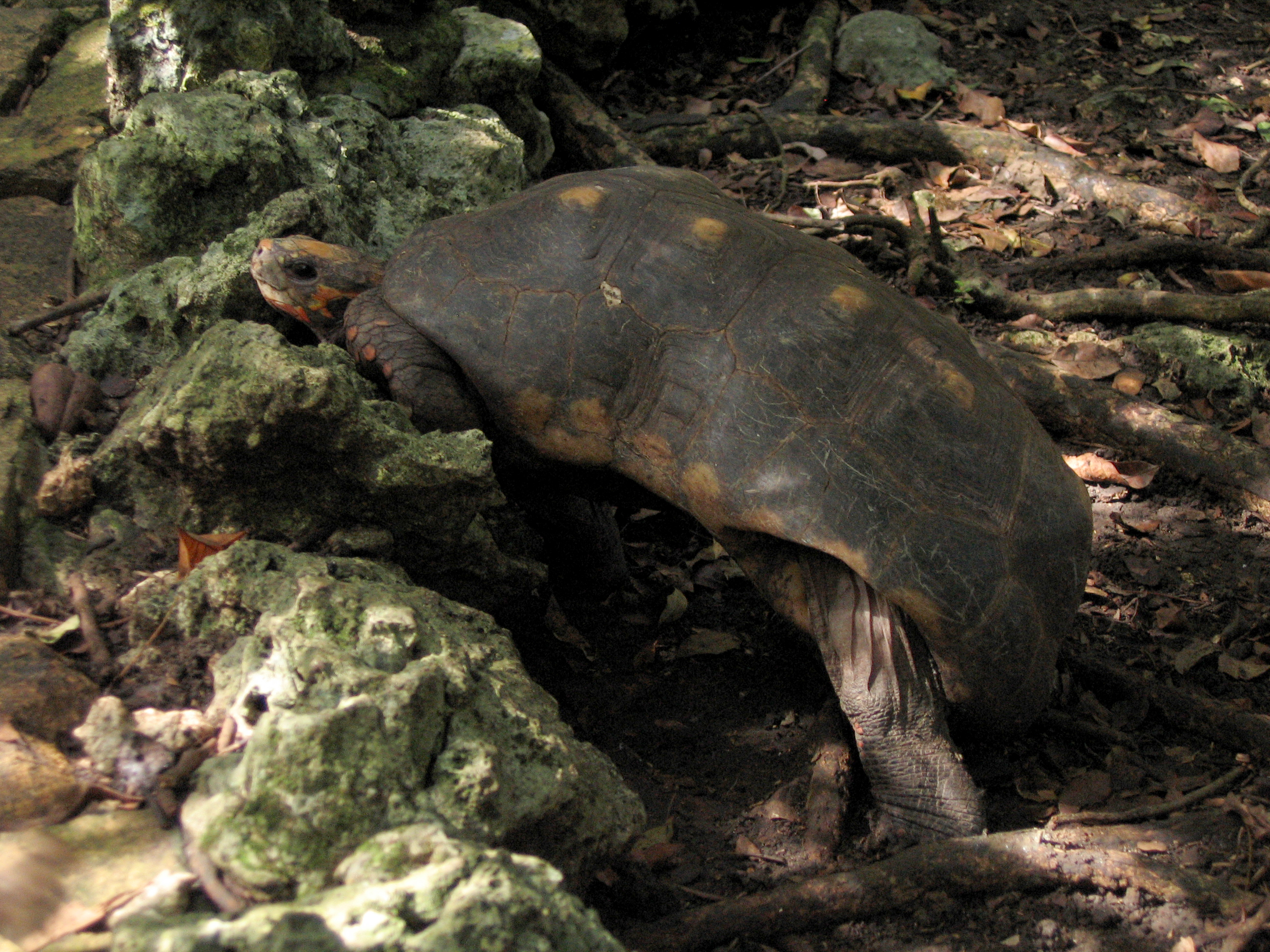
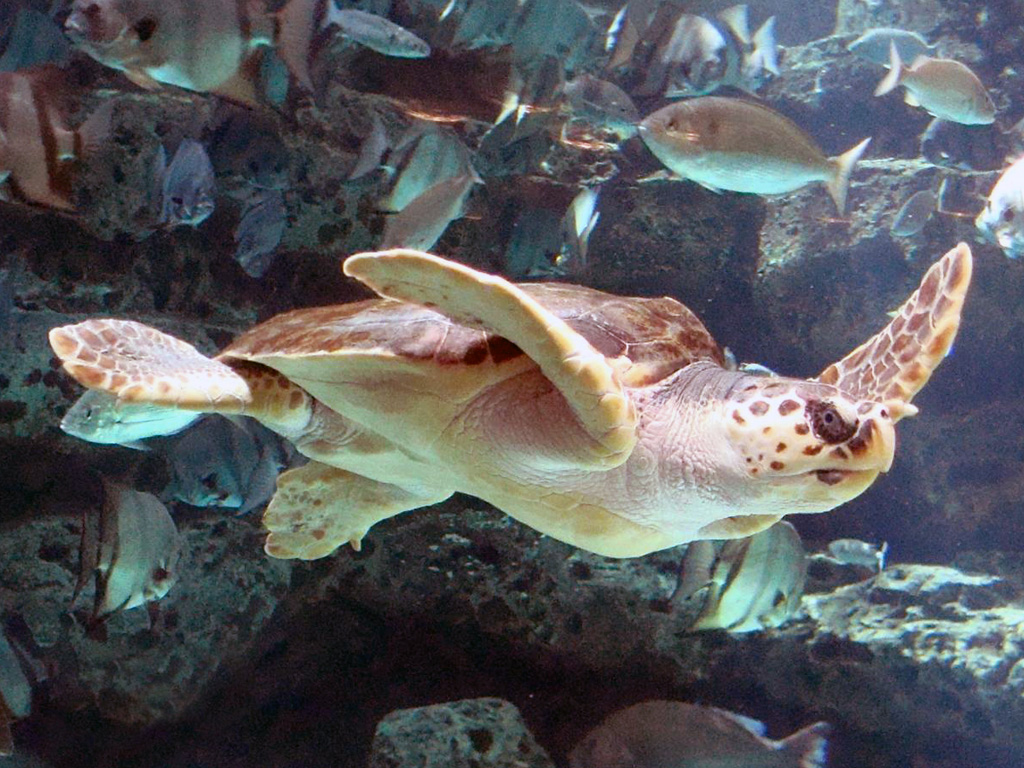
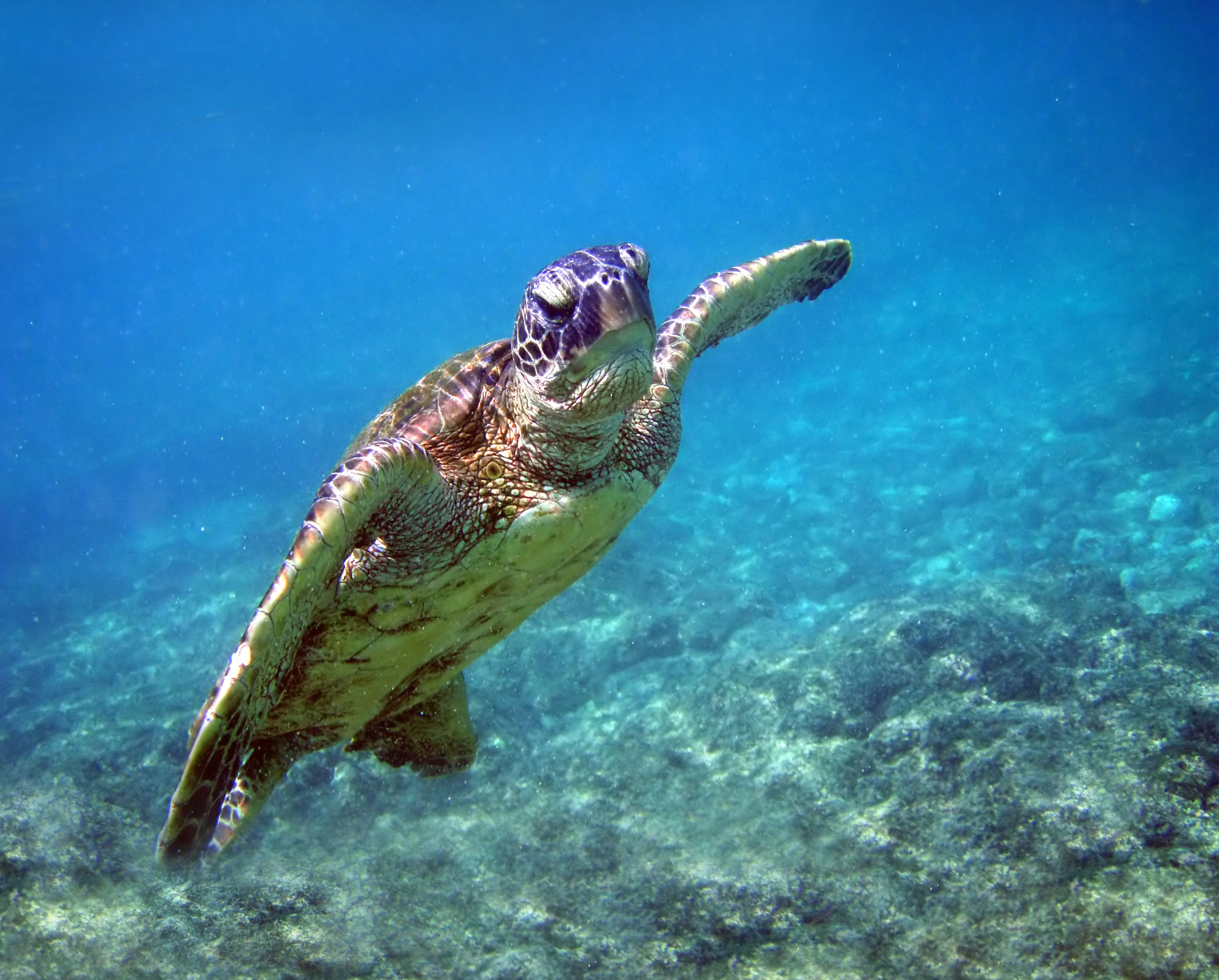
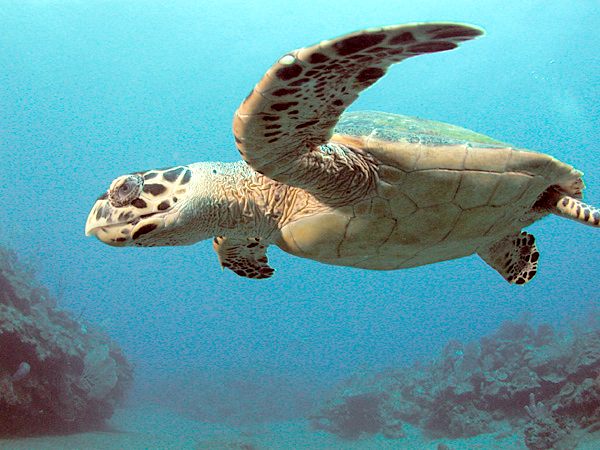
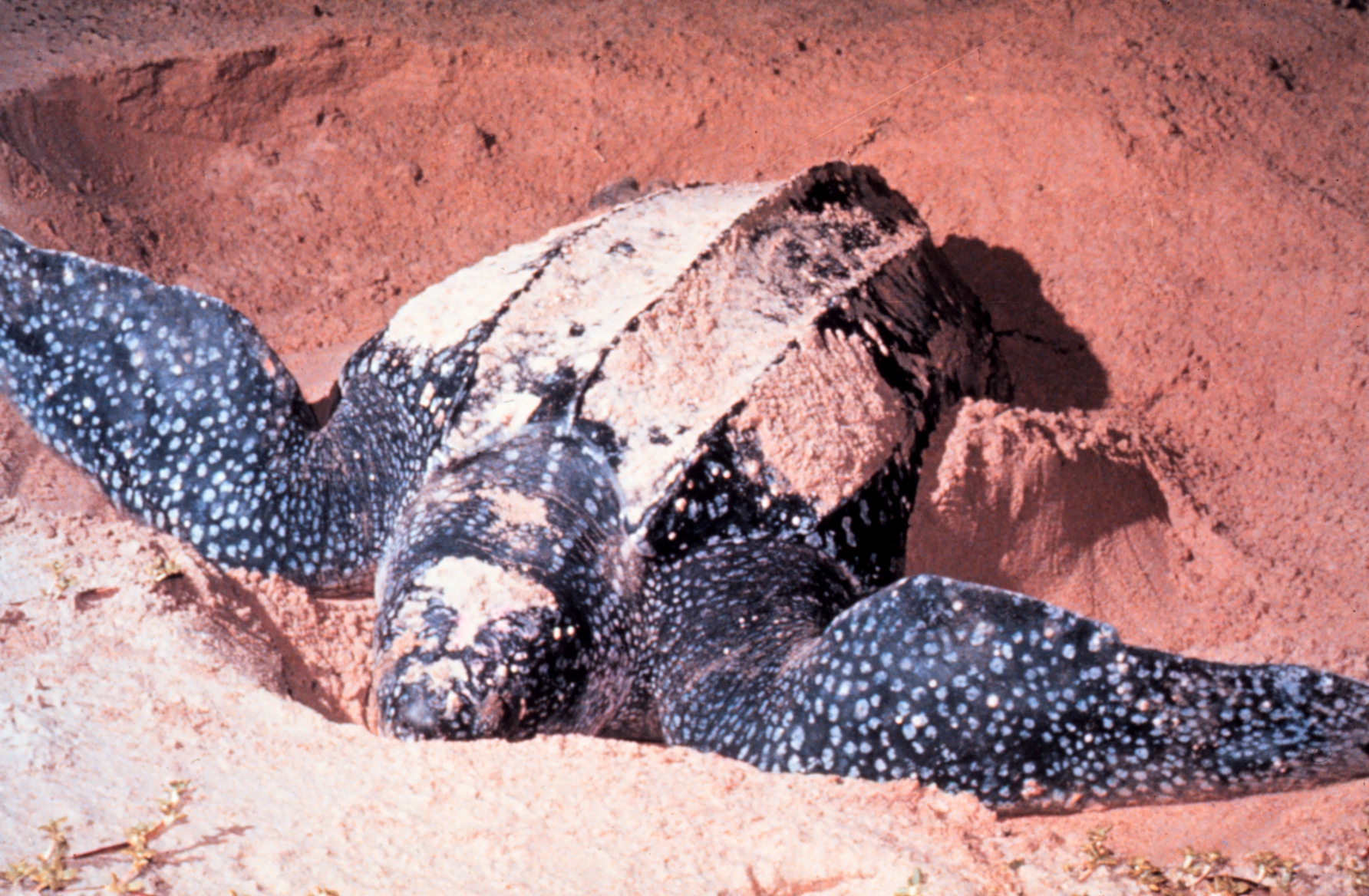
Tortoises (Testudinidae)
Species	Common name(s)	Notes	Image
Geochelone carbonaria	Red-footed tortoise	Probably introduced. Only known in captive populations and individuals that escaped from such areas; unlikely that a viable wild population exists.
Scaly sea turtles (Cheloniidae)
Species	Common name(s)	Notes	Image
Caretta caretta	Loggerhead turtle	Endangered.
Chelonia mydas	Green turtle	Endangered. Seen feeding in waters near the shore. Recorded nesting on Barbados.
Eretmochelys imbricata	Hawksbill turtle	Critically Endangered. Recorded nesting on Barbados.
Leathery sea turtles (Dermochelyidae)
Species	Common name(s)	Notes	Image
Dermochelys coriacea	Leatherback turtle	Critically Endangered. Recorded nesting on Barbados.

=== Lizards and snakes (Squamata) ===
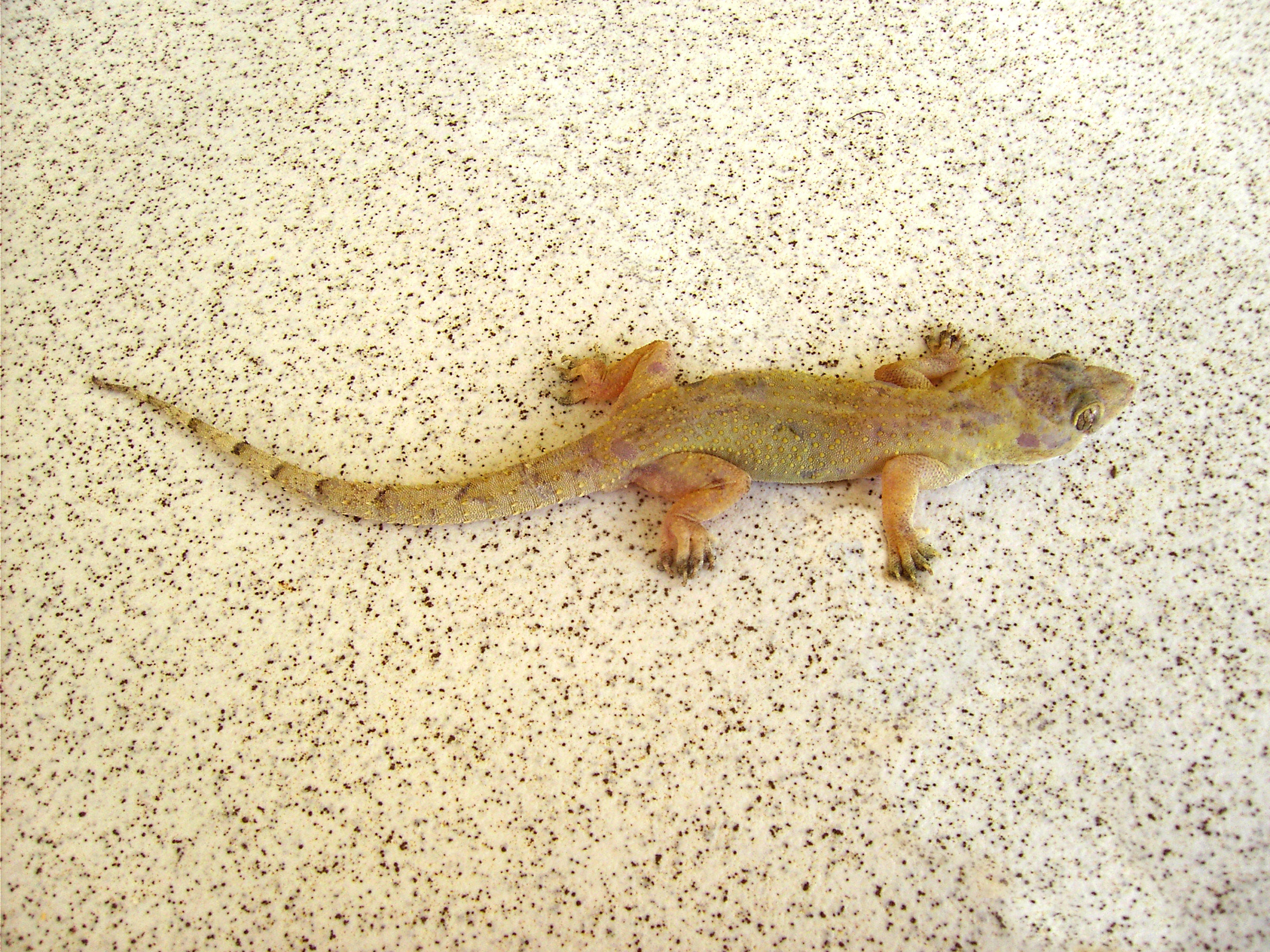
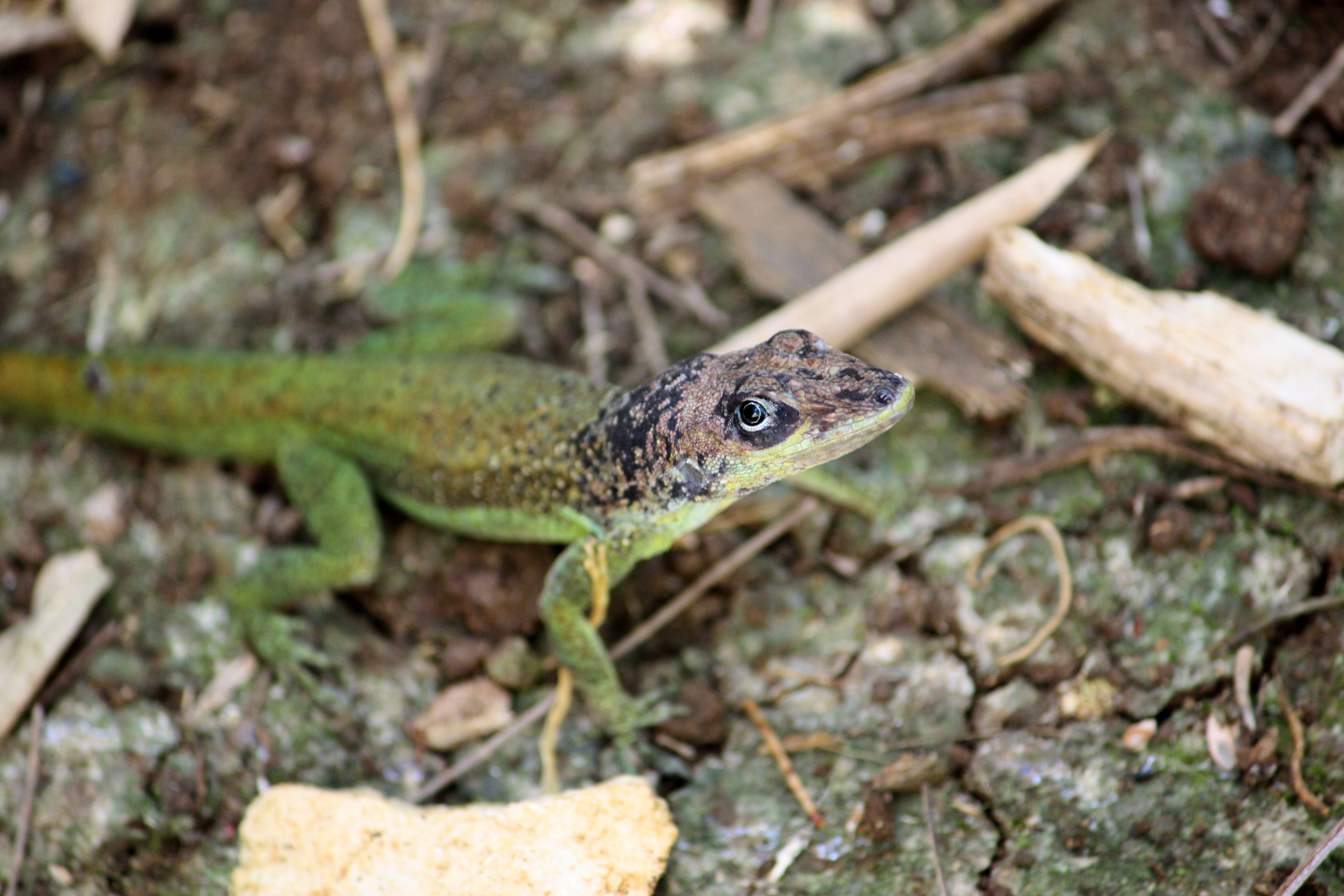
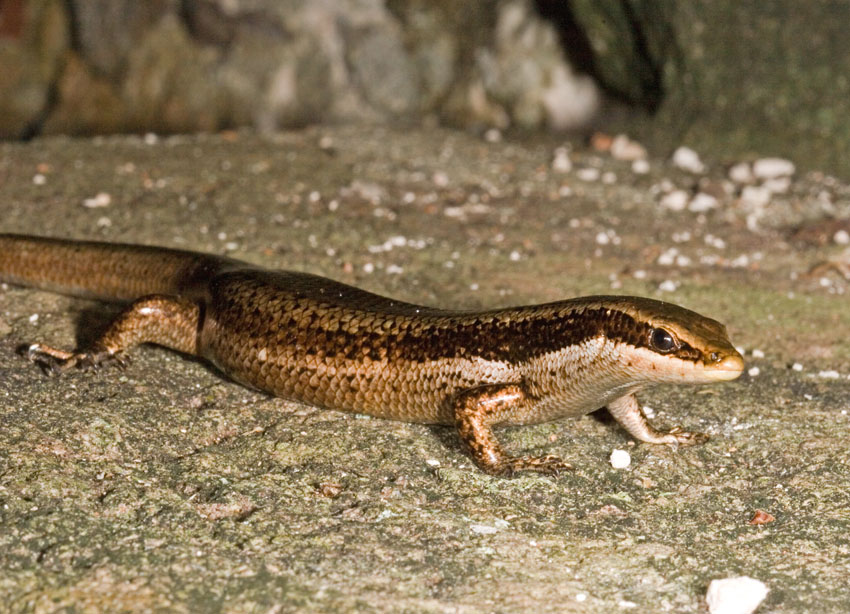
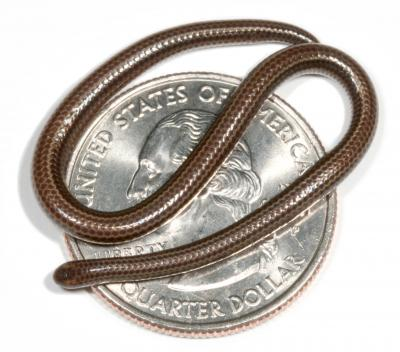
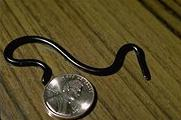
Geckos (Gekkonidae)
Species	Common name(s)	Notes	Image
Hemidactylus mabouia	House gecko	Introduced.
Phyllodactylus pulcher	Barbados leaf-toed gecko	Endemic. Reported from Ragged Point, St. Philip; its range has not yet been systematically studied.
Iguanas and Anolids (Iguanidae)
Species	Common name(s)	Notes	Image
Anolis extremus	Barbados anole	Originally endemic; introduced to other islands. Widespread and abundant.
Anolis sagrei	Brown anole	Introduced
Whiptails (Teiidae)
Species	Common name(s)	Notes	Image
Kentropyx borckiana	Guyana kentropyx, Guyana tegu	The only Kentropyx species found in the Eastern Caribbean. Only females are known to exist; the species as a whole is believed to consist only of unisexual clones. Primarily found in central parishes; reported as locally common in St. Thomas and St. George.
Ameiva ameiva	Giant ameiva	Recently introduced
Microteiids (Gymnophthalmidae)
Species	Common name(s)	Notes	Image
Gymnophthalmus underwoodi	Underwood's spectacled tegu	Native status uncertain
Skinks (Scincidae)
Species	Common name(s)	Notes	Image
Mabuya mabouya		Regional endemic. Possibly extirpated from Barbados.
Alinea lanceolata	Barbados skink	Endemic. Critically endangered, possibly extinct
Worm snakes (Typhlopidae)
Species	Common name(s)	Notes	Image
Leptotyphlops carlae	Barbados threadsnake	Endemic. First described in 2008; specimens were previously described as L. bilineatus. The world's smallest known snake.
Indotyphlops braminus	Brahminy blind snake, flowerpot blind snake	Recently introduced; apparently widespread.
Colubrids (Colubridae)
Species	Common name(s)	Notes	Image
Liophis perfuscus	Barbados racer, tan ground snake	Endangered. Endemic. Possibly extinct, as a confirmed sighting has not been made since 1961.
Mastigodryas bruesi	Barbour's tropical racer	Recently introduced, possibly through banana shipments. Originally native to Saint Vincent and Grenada.

== See also ==
- Fauna of Barbados
