= Fauna of Barbados =

Native animals of Barbados

The fauna of Barbados comprises all the animal species inhabiting the island of Barbados and its surrounding waters. Barbados has less biodiversity than the other Antilles. Human activities are responsible for the change in the composition of the fauna, in particular, the replacement of native species. Species that are able to adapt to human presence have survived.

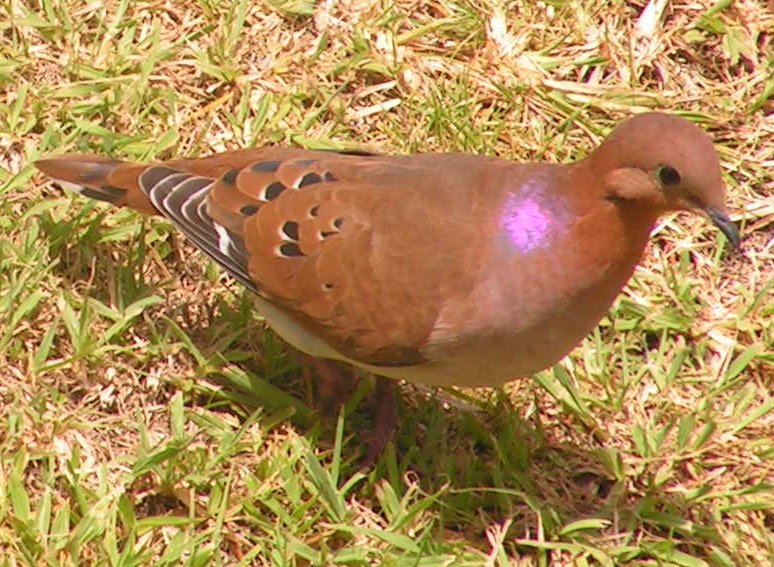
The ubiquitous Zenaida dove is found throughout the island

== Origin of Barbadian Fauna ==
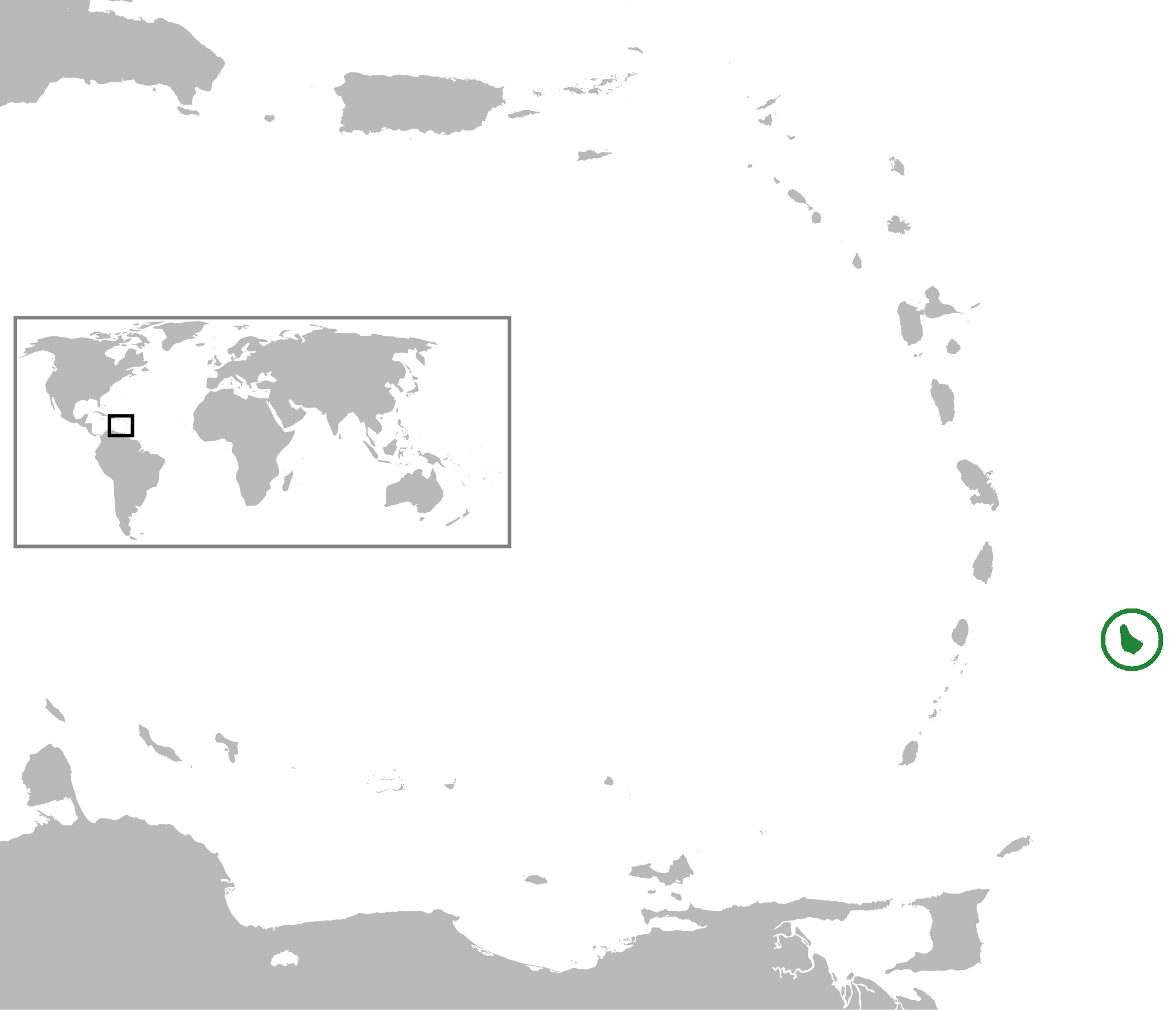
Position of Barbados in the Lesser Antilles

The island of Barbados was formed by tectonic uplift and is younger than the surrounding lesser Antillean islands, primarily of volcanic origin. Avian colonization has therefore occurred recently relative to the geological age of the island, accounting in part for the lack of endemic species relative to neighboring islands.

Species capable of crossing the sea barrier by flight enjoyed a comparative advantage, helping to explain why avian species are more numerous than other animal groups, such as mammals. In addition to the natural colonization of the island by animals, humans have contributed to the faunal composition of the island through species introductions (intentional and accidental).

== Mammals ==
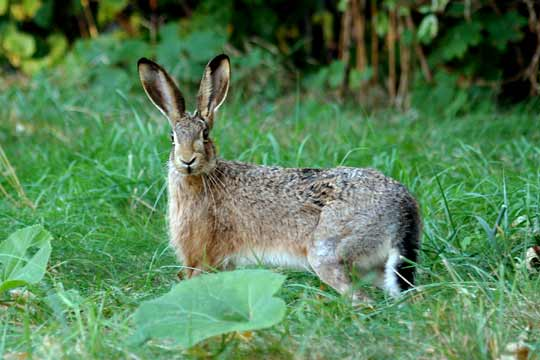
The European hare, like the majority of mammal species on the island, was introduced.

Few mammals live on the island, composed almost entirely of introduced species. The Norway rat (Rattus norvegicus), house mouse (Mus musculus), European hare (Lepus europaeus), small Indian mongoose (Urva auropunctata), and green monkey (Cercopithecus aethiops sabaeus) are the most notable examples. Pigs were introduced by the Portuguese in 1563 as a future food source; the introduction was successful and a feral pig population persisted up until the point of British settlement of the island, after which they became extirpated.

The now extinct Barbados raccoon (Procyon lotor gloveralleni) is considered to have been endemic to the island; however, even this subspecies may have been introduced by Amerindians in prehistoric times. An extinct species of rice rat Megalomys georginae was described in 2012 based on subfossil remains recovered from an Amerindian archaeological site.

The only remaining native mammals are a number of bat species; the most common of which is the velvety free-tailed bat (Molossus molossus), which emerges at dusk to feed on insects.

A breed of sheep known as the Barbados Blackbelly sheep originated in Barbados. It has been exported to various nations around the world, including the United States where it is sometimes called affectionately "Barbado Sheep".

Marine mammals are not frequently seen in Barbadian waters. Some species, however, particularly bottlenose dolphins (Tursiops truncatus) and humpback whales (Megaptera novaeangliae), are occasionally seen offshore on the north coast.

Feral dogs and cats, introduced by humans, are also present on the island.

== Birds ==
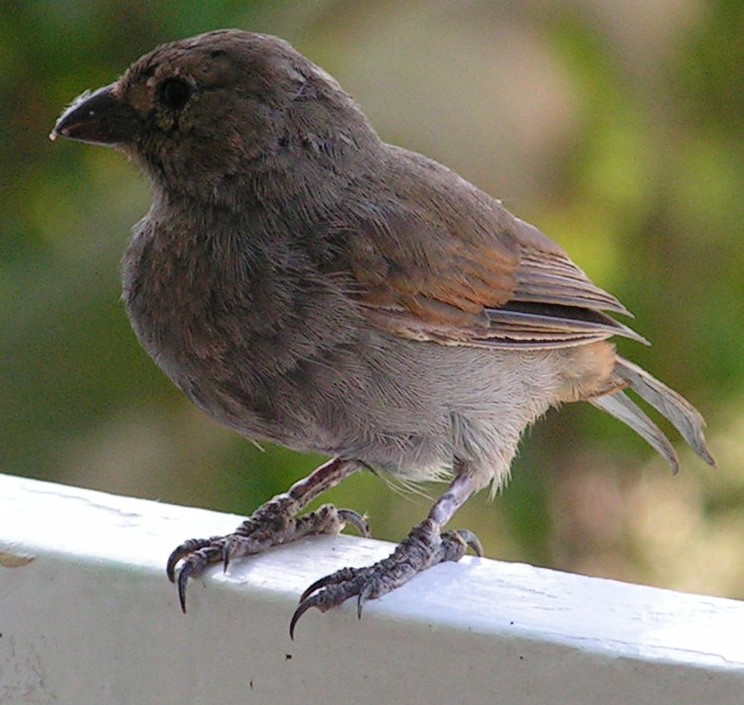
The Barbados bullfinch is an endemic species.

Birds are fairly well represented on the island, with most having adapted well to the presence of humans.

Two extinct species have been described from the Late Pleistocene of Barbados, the goose Neochen barbadiana and the Barbados rail Fulica podagrica, although the classification of the rail is questionable.

Early European visitors also reported finding a species of parrot on the island, which subsequently became extinct. Currently, parrots are represented by a few escaped or released individuals which have formed feral populations; most notable is a small population of the orange-winged parrot (Amazona amazonica) which has become established among several Roystonea palms in the Belleville district of the capital Bridgetown. The brown-throated parakeet (Aratinga pertinax), introduced to the island, is rarely seen.

The endemic subspecies of the scaly-breasted thrasher (Allenia fusca atlantica) may have become extirpated from the Island. A resident race of the yellow warbler (Dendroica petechia petechia) is also threatened, mostly due to loss of its mangrove swamp habitat; the last major refuge for this species is the Graeme Hall Swamp in the south of the Island, However some reports suggest the species is expanding its range on the island.

Icterids such as the Carib grackle (Quiscalus lugubris) and the shiny cowbird (Molothrus bonariensis), which often parasitizes the nests of the former species, are quite common.

Seedeaters include the black-faced grassquit (Tiaris bicolor) and the grassland yellow finch (Sicalis luteola), known locally as the grass canary. Introduced from South America the grassland yellow finch is now faced with extirpation due to poaching for the pet trade. Until recently considered a non-sexually dimorphic subspecies of the Lesser Antillean bullfinch (Loxigilla noctis), the Barbados bullfinch (Loxigilla barbadensis) has recently been elevated to species level, and is the only extant endemic bird species on Barbados.

There are two species of tyrant flycatcher found on the island; the grey kingbird (Tyrannus dominicensis) which is quite common, and the Caribbean elaenia (Elaenia martinica) which is rarer.

Representatives of the family Columbidae include the zenaida dove (Zenaida aurita), common ground dove (Columbina passerina), scaly-naped pigeon (Patagioenas squamosa), and the ubiquitous rock pigeon (Columba livia). Another species, the eared dove (Zenaida auriculata), which was previously reported as an occasional visitor to the island, has now established a breeding population.

Nectar consuming species include the Antillean crested hummingbird (Orthorhyncus cristatus), green-throated carib (Eulampis holosericeus), and the bananaquit (Coereba flaveola).

Heron species include, the cattle egret (Bubulcus ibis) and the fairly rare green heron (Butorides virescens). A recent addition to the island's avifauna is the little egret (Egretta garzetta), which has recently colonized the island from Africa.

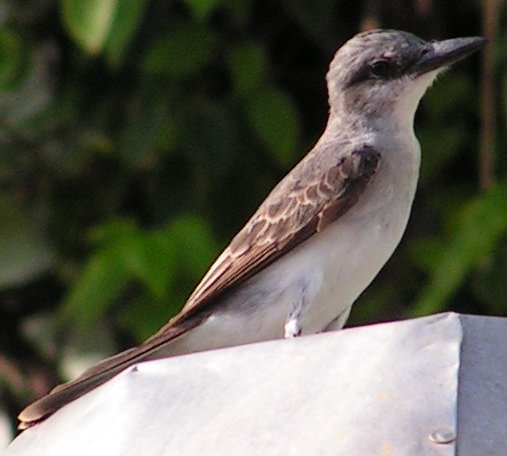
A grey kingbird

Species that may be encountered in wetland areas include the masked duck (Nomonyx dominica), American coot (Fulica americana), and the common moorhen (Gallinula chloropus) The southern lapwing (Vanellus chilensis), a shorebird, has recently bred upon the island; having spread to Barbados from Trinidad and Tobago and northern South America.

Substantial numbers of migratory birds either over-wintering on the island, or en route from North America to South American wintering grounds are seen annually. Shorebirds are one such group of birds that stop off in Barbados during migration; tens of thousands, however, lured to artificial wetlands, are shot annually for sport.

== Reptiles and Amphibians ==
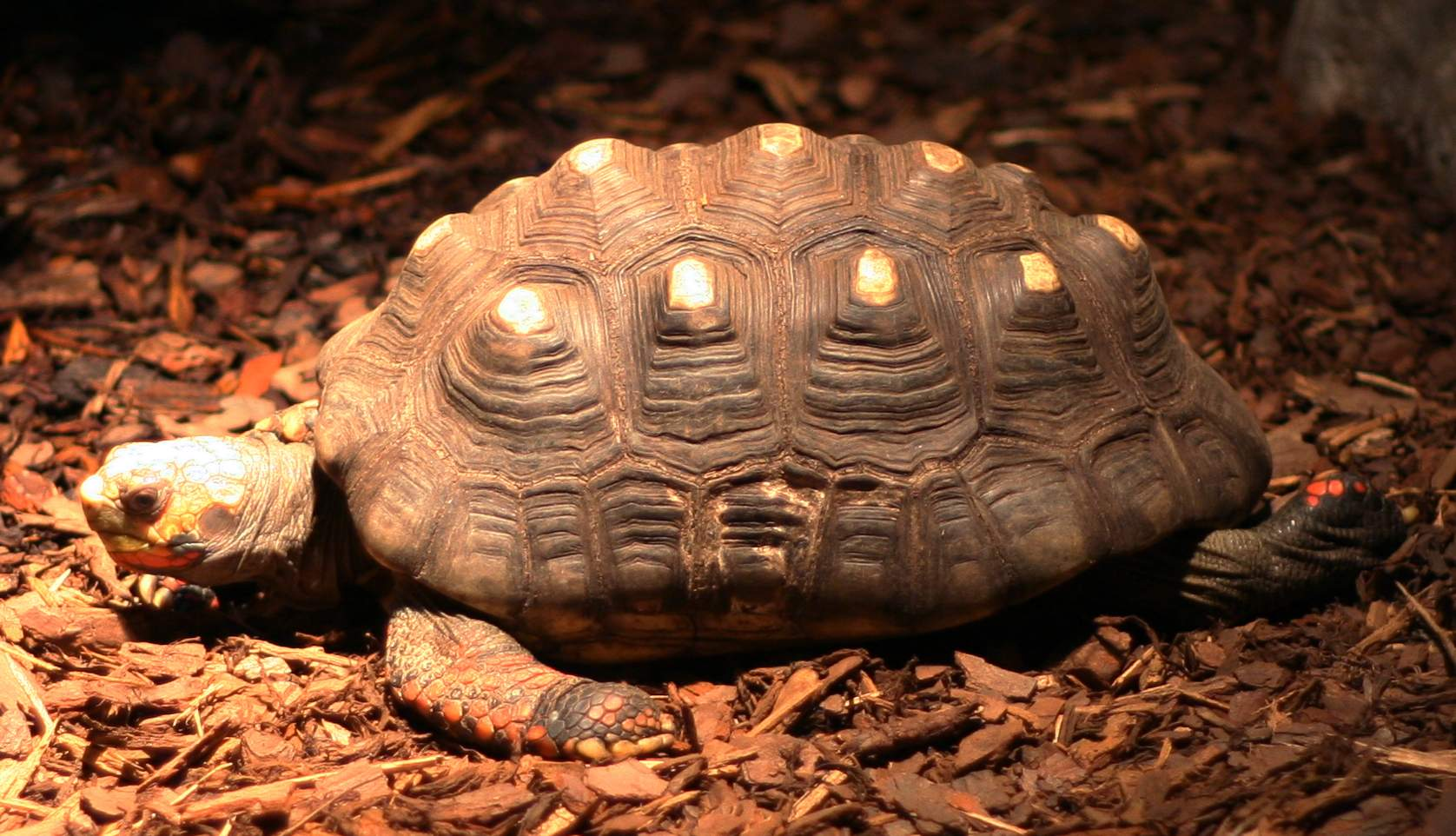
A red-footed tortoise

The green iguana (Iguana iguana) formerly resided on the island before being extirpated. An endemic species of anole lizard (Anolis extremus), and the introduced tropical house gecko (Hemidactylus mabouia) are both common species; while Underwood's spectacled tegu (Gymnophthalmus underwoodi), and a native species of Kentropyx lizard (Kentropyx borckiana) are rarer on the island. The endemic Barbados leaf-toed gecko (Phyllodactylus pulcher) was thought to be extinct until a population was rediscovered in 2011 on the outcrop known as Culpepper Island.

Populations of an endemic Liophis grass snake, the Barbados racer (Erythrolamprus perfuscus), have been devastated as a result of predation by the introduced Indian mongoose, with no confirmed sightings of the species since 1961. Another snake species, Mastigodryas bruesi and the world's smallest snake, Leptotyphlops carlae, have also been recorded from the island.

The red-footed tortoise (Geochelone carbonaria) is widely kept in captivity; it was likely introduced to the island, as no reports of it were made by early European explorers to the island.

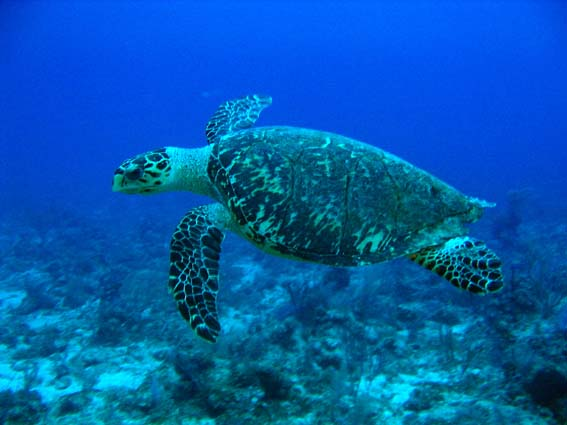
A hawksbill turtle

Currently there are two species of sea turtle which nest in Barbados, the hawksbill turtle (Eretmochelys imbricata), and the leatherback turtle (Dermochelys coriacea). Though not nesting on the island, the green sea turtle (Chelonia mydas) does forage in nearshore seagrass beds. Coastal infrastructure, such as hotel properties, has encroached upon the nesting grounds of sea turtles, while coastal lights also detrimentally impact nesting females.

The cane toad (Bufo marinus) from South America and the Johnstone's whistling frog (Eleutherodactylus johnstonei) encompass the islands' amphibian community. The introduction of the cane toad was done as a biological control aimed at insect pests of sugarcane; as has been the case elsewhere, the lack of predators to control the cane toad has led to uncontrolled populations in some areas.

== Fish ==
=== Freshwater Fish ===
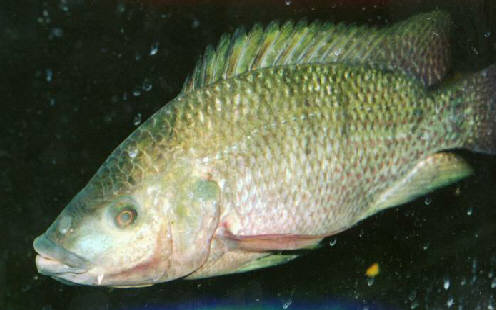
Oreochromis mossambicus

The wild form of the guppy (Poecilia reticulata) is native to Barbados as well as Trinidad and northern South America. Introductions of aquarium varieties of the guppy into the wild mean that it may be impossible to distinguish between original and fancy varieties.

Originally intended for aquaculture, tilapia species including, Oreochromis mossambicus, and Tilapia zillii have become widely established in ponds and streams across the island.

=== Brackish Water Fish ===
Brackish water species also occur, particularly in coastal wetlands such as the Graeme Hall Swamp; one such species is the mangrove rivulus (Rivulus marmoratus), notable for its unique ability of self-fertilization. A resident and isolated population of Atlantic tarpon, (Megalops atlanticus) has become established in the Graeme Hall Swamp.

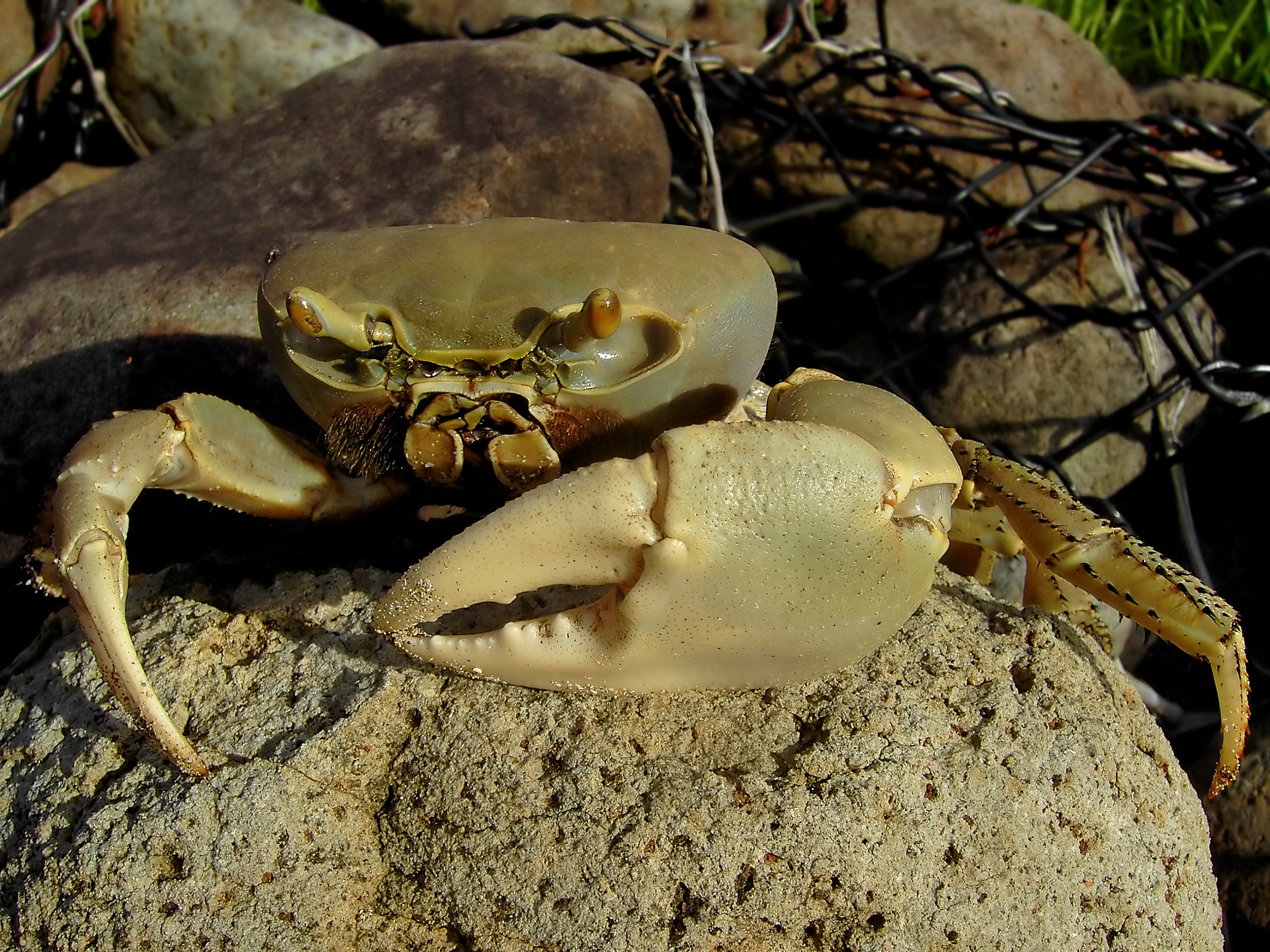
Cardisoma guanhumi

== Invertebrates ==
=== Crustaceans ===
Terrestrial crab species found on the island include Cardisoma guanhumi and Gecarcinus lateralis.
