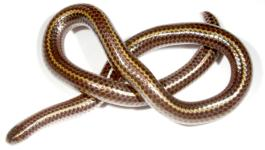
- Photograph by Dr. Blair Hedges, Penn State.

Conservation status
- Endangered (IUCN 3.1)

Scientific classification
- Kingdom: Animalia
- Phylum: Chordata
- Class: Reptilia
- Order: Squamata
- Suborder: Serpentes
- Family: Leptotyphlopidae
- Genus: Tetracheilostoma
- Species: T. breuili

Binomial name
- Tetracheilostoma breuili Hedges, 2008

Synonyms
- Leptotyphlops breuili Hedges, 2008; Tetracheilostoma breuili — Adalsteinsson et al., 2009

= St. Lucia threadsnake =

Species of snake

The St. Lucia threadsnake (Tetracheilostoma breuili) is a species of blind snake in the family Leptotyphlopidae. The species is native to the West Indies.

== Etymology ==
The specific name, breuili, is in honor of French herpetologist Michel Breuil.

== Geographic range ==
T. breuili is endemic to the Caribbean island-nation of Saint Lucia.

== Habitat ==
The preferred natural habitat of T. breuili is forest, at altitudes of 40–60 m (130–200 ft).

== Description ==
T. breuili can reach a total length (including tail) of 119 mm (4.7 in). It is dark brown with two yellowish lateral stripes, like the closely related L. bilineatus (Martinique) and L. carlae (Barbados). It differs from those two species by having two spots behind its head, and a dark tail.

== Reproduction ==
T. breuili is oviparous.
