= Shipping Association of Barbados =

National shipping institution of Barbados

The Shipping Association of Barbados (SAB) is the national shipping institution of Barbados with its headquarters in Bridgetown. Formed in January 1981, the association consists primarily of ship members and stevedore companies who meet on a monthly basis. SAB is a wider member of the Caribbean Shipping Association (CSA).

== See also ==
- Deep Water Harbour
