= Culpepper Island =

Islet in Saint Philip, Barbados

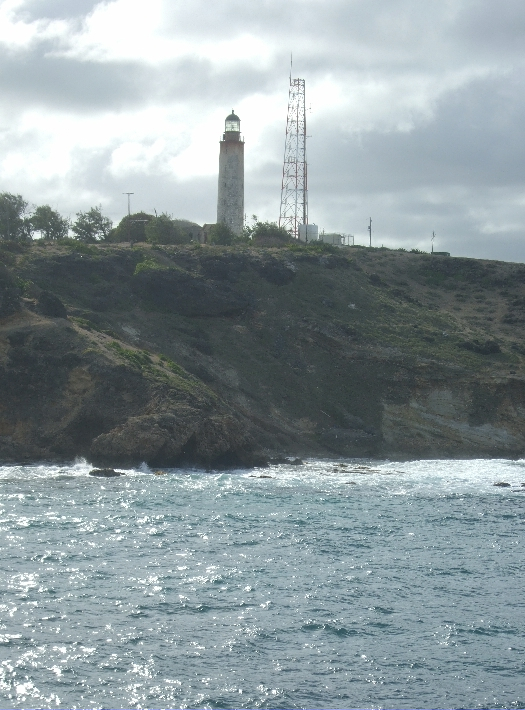
- Ragged Point Lighthouse, viewed from the northern end of Cobblers Reef

- Location of Culpepper island in Barbados Culpepper Island (Lesser Antilles) Culpepper Island (the Caribbean)

Geography
- Location: Caribbean
- Coordinates: 13°09′57″N 59°26′36″W
- Length: 40 m (130 ft)
- Width: 50 m (160 ft)
- Highest elevation: 18 m (59 ft)

Administration
- Barbados
- Parish: Saint Philip

Additional information
- Time zone: AST (UTC−04:00)

Culpepper Island is an uninhabited islet in the Atlantic Ocean located 30 metres (98 ft) off the coast of Barbados.

== Geography ==
It is quite possible to wade out to Culpepper Island from the mainland during low tide as it is only about 30 metres (98 ft) away, but discretion must be used, as Culpepper is on the turbulent Atlantic Ocean side of Barbados. Further, the rocky footing can also be dangerous to walk on. Visitors are well advised to bear in mind that the East Point Lighthouse at Ragged Point was built to save ships from the dangers of this same turbulent coastline and Cobblers Reef.

== Flora and fauna ==
Culpepper Island is sparsely overgrown and uninhabited. It was claimed that peasants from Barbados once carried sheep to graze on the island, but this claim seems uncredible because neither the small size nor the very sparse vegetation makes the island attractive for this purpose.

An adult pair of Barbados leaf-toed geckos, once presumed extinct, were discovered on the island in 2011.

== History ==
The name of the island goes back to a settler's family name who resided there from about 1650 to 1830. Historically, the island was attributed to Barbados Saint Philip Parish.

On 12 March 2006, members of the region's indigenous Lokono-Arawak and Karifuna-Carib tribes claimed ownership over the island in protest of what they believed to be a violation of international indigenous rights laws by several Caribbean governments. They claimed to be descendants of Princess Marian, daughter of the last hereditary Lokono-Arawak chief Amorotahe Haubariria (Flying Harpy Eagle) of the Eagle Clan Lokono-Arawaks, who is buried in Westbury Cemetery in Barbados.

== See also ==
- Barbados
- Pelican Island
