= Eunice Gibson =

Barbados nurse

- Born: 14 February 1895
- Died: 5 December 1974 (aged 79)
- Occupation: Nurse

Eunice Gibson MBE (14 February 1895 – 5 December 1974) was a Barbadian nurse and the founder of the Barbados Nurses Association.

== Activism ==
Gibson founded the Nursing Employment Bureau in 1937 and was elected to the Bridgetown City Council in 1959.

=== Barbados Nurses Association ===
In July 1936, Gibson and 11 other nurses formed the Barbados Nurses Association (BNA) to improve working conditions at Barbados General Hospital. Gibson led the organization until 1946. During her tenure, the BNA was made a municipal corporation by the Parliament of Barbados on 15 February 1943. She remained an active member of the organization for 37 years. Gibson campaigned the International Nurses Association in 1957 to accept the BNA as one of its members.

== Death and legacy ==
Gibson died on 5 December 1974 and was interred at Bridgetown's Westbury Cemetery.

The Barbados Nurses Association annually hosts an awards ceremony named after Gibson, the Eunice Gibson Memorial Lecture and Awards Ceremony. A hospital, Eunice Gibson Polyclinic, was also named after Gibson.
