= Pelican Island (Barbados) =

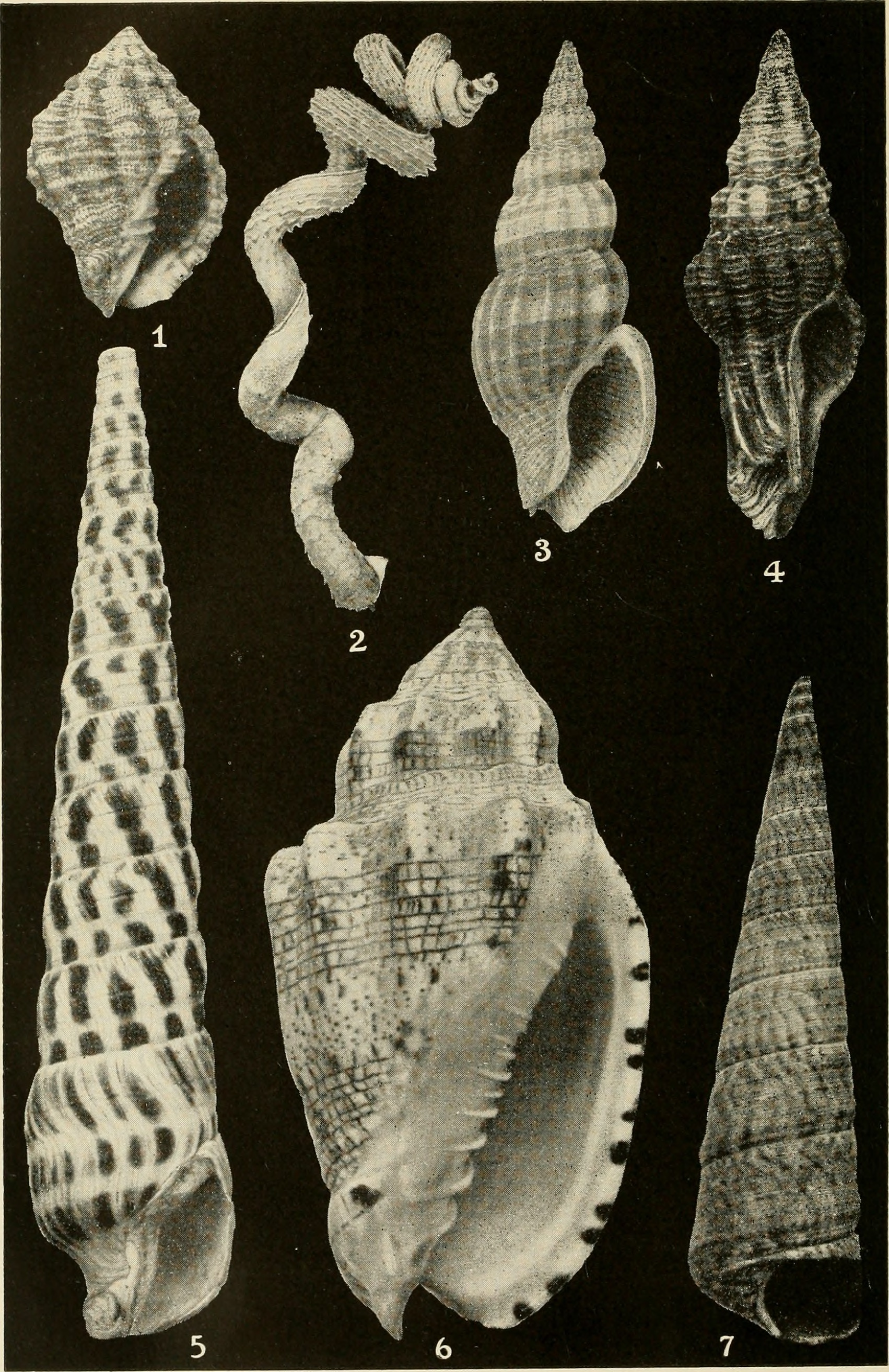
- Item 6. Voluta musica, variety carneolata collected at Pelican Island, Barbados by Barbados-Antigua expedition in 1919. Per Lamarck.

- Location within Barbados Location within Lesser Antilles Location within the Caribbean

Geography
- Location: Caribbean
- Coordinates: 13°06′02″N 59°37′43″W

Administration
- Barbados

Additional information
- Time zone: AST (UTC−04:00)

Pelican Island was a small uninhabited island that once existed off the west coast of Bridgetown and Fontabelle, in St. Michael, Barbados.

== History ==
According to historical record, the island received its name from brown pelicans (Pelecanus occidentalis) that would nest there. To get there, one could have used one of the pair of nearby boat jetties along the Barbados shoreline, or during low tide it was believed to have been possible to wade out to the island as well.

The island held a quarantine facility specifically for sick crew and passengers from ships, in order to prevent spread of infectious diseases to the mainland. There were housing facilities for patients, a morgue, a caretaker's quarters and a laundry area equipped with a cauldron for boiling clothes for sterilisation.

Over the five years of 1956 to 1961, a southwest section of the Atlantic Ocean between the island and Barbados was reclaimed and filled in during the building of the Bridgetown Port, and now Pelican Island has become incorporated into the mainland in the Bridgetown Deep Water Harbour complex.

== Tourist attraction ==
There is now a tourist attraction called The Pelican Village ("Pelican Crafts Centre") in the area, at the port, as a tribute to the separate island that once existed there.

== See also ==
- Culpepper Island
