= Port of Bridgetown =

Port in Barbados

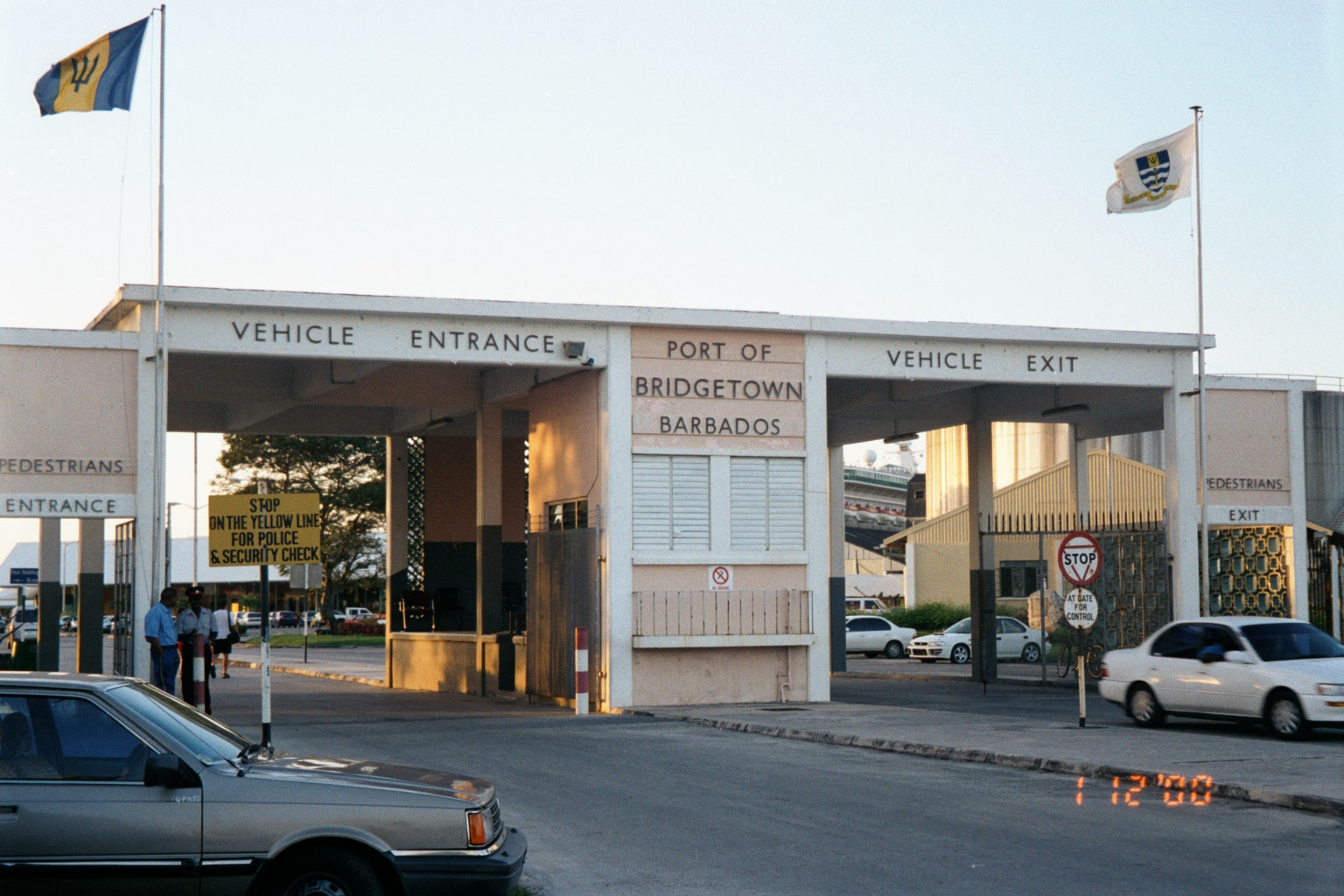
- Gatehouse for the Deep Water Harbour from the Princess Alice Highway. (c. November 2000)
- Interactive map of Port of Bridgetown

Location
- Country: Barbados
- Location: Bridgetown, St. Michael
- Coordinates: 13.106°N 59.632°W
- UN/LOCODE: BBBGI

Details
- Opened: 1961
- Operated by: Barbados Port, Inc.
- Owned by: Government of Barbados
- Type of Harbor: Artificial; (Coastal Breakwater)
- No. of berths: 12
- No. of wharfs: 0
- No. of piers: 0
- Draft depth: 11.6 m
- Employees: 592

Statistics
- Website www.barbadosport.com

The Port of Bridgetown (officially the Deep Water Harbour), (UN/LOCODE: BB BGI, Port Callsign: 8PB) is a seaport in Bridgetown on the southwest coast of Barbados. Situated at the North-Western end of Carlisle Bay, the harbour handles all of the country's international bulk ship-based trade and commerce. In addition to international-shipping the Deep Water Harbour is the port of entry for southern-Caribbean cruise ships. The port is one of three designated ports of entry in Barbados, along with the privately owned Port Saint Charles marina and the Sir Grantley Adams International Airport. The port's time zone is GMT −4, and it handles roughly 700,000 cruise passengers and 900,000 tonnes of containerised cargo per year.

== History ==
In 1948–1949 Sir Douglas Richie, M.C. Vice-chairman, of the Port of London Authority Published "Report on the Proposed Construction of a Deep Water Wharf" with a proposal of a £3,000,000 port facility for Barbados. Construction of the Deep Water Harbour began in 1956 by Costain Group of Britain, and cost EC$28,000,000 through completion in 1961. The port was formed by creating a man-made isthmus across the shallow strait that existed off the coast of Fontabelle, St. Michael. The isthmus formed 90 acres (0.36 km^{2}) of new land stretching from the original west coast of Barbados, out to a small uninhabited, ex-quarantine island just offshore, named Pelican Island. After the initial completion, the harbour later underwent a $22 million expansion seventeen years later.

In 2002, Barbados Port Inc. contracted with Jan De Nul Group of Companies of Belgium to carry out dredging at the port facility. The dredging was deemed necessary to allow some of the world's largest cruise ships to berth in Barbados rather than anchoring offshore. The project followed a rigorous environmental monitoring programme by the Barbados Port Inc. along with key regulatory agencies, namely the Town Planning Department, the Coastal Zone Management Unit, the Environmental Engineering Division and the University of the West Indies' Natural Resources Management Programme to ensure that the oceanographic and sediment processes, the water quality, and the marine communities were not compromised in any way. During this operation, the port's depth was increased to 11.6 metres (from 9.6 metres). Reclaimed material from the dredging was added to increase the port's cargo area by 9 acres.

In December 2008, Minister of International Transport George Hutson announced that due to congestion between cargo and passenger ships at the Deep Water Harbour, the country needed to look at expansion at the facility following the last upgrade undertaken in 2002. Due to the importance of Tourism to Barbados' economy, the government is presently reviewing a further $70 million upgrade.

In September 2010, the Barbados government stated it was reviewing a list of joint-venture partners to construct the new cruise ship facilities at the port with expected construction to begin in 2011.

Due to increased activity at the port, officials say it is poised to become a "super-hub of the southern Caribbean", rivalling Puerto Rico.

In 2012, the Government of Barbados announced the desire to establish a new separate Cruise terminal just to south along the Princess Alice Highway. As advisors to the Government, Royal Caribbean and STI were selected to work with the government on the project to be called The Sugar Point Cruise Development or The Sugar Point Cruise Terminal. The facility will function as a means to separate cruise-traffic to the country from the containerised-traffic which will remain at the Deep Water Harbour. The move should help to mitigate delays which effect container-ships to Bridgetown which at times must have idle offshore for Cruise ships to make available a berth as cruise ships are given preference at the harbour. The first phase of the new terminal is expected to cost in the region of BDS$300 million, and dredge work is planned by the administration to begin in November 2012.

== Administration ==
Responsibility for administering the port is vested in the CEO of Barbados Port Incorporated (BPI), as an ISO (9001:2015) Certified Company BPI is statutory corporation that oversees all matters affecting the efficient operations of the harbour facility. The company also advises the Ministry of International Business and International Transport who has ultimate authority for the Deep Water Harbour. Barbados Port Inc. is a member of: the American Association of Port Authorities, the Caribbean Shipping Association (CSA), the Port Management Association of the Caribbean (P.M.A.C.), the Shipping Association of Barbados (SAB), a member of the International Association of Ports and Harbours (IAPH). and an affiliate of the Caribbean Maritime Institute (CMI).

It has been awarded the title of "Caribbean Port of the Year" for: 1993, 1995, 1997, 1998; the "Best Multi-Purpose Terminal (Container terminal)" in 2004 and 2005; the safest port in the Caribbean region in 2011. Top-Rated Southern Caribbean Destinations 2016 & 2017

== Shipping ==
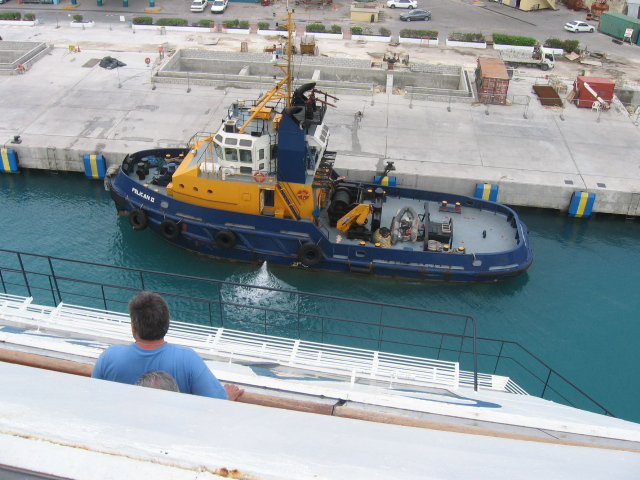
Tugboat Pelican II in Barbados.

=== Summary of Annual Operations 2011-2020 ===
	2011	2012	2013	2014	2015	2016	2017	2018	2019	2020
Total TEUs handled	77,053	72,163	74,923	78,431	86,508	105,326	107,169	100,961	98,435	89,470
Vessel Calls	1,642	1,547	1,585	1,555	1,633	1,782	1,512	1,508	1,398	1,151

=== Trade ===
Top trading partners:

Imports: consumer goods, machinery, foodstuffs, construction materials, chemicals, fuel, electrical components

Top import sources (2009)
- Trinidad and Tobago – 28.52%,
- United States of America – 27.96%,
- Colombia – 7.13%,
- China – 4.76%,
- United Kingdom – 4.39%

Exports: manufactures, sugar and molasses, cotton, rum, other foods and beverages, chemicals, light manufacturing, electrical components

Top export destinations (2009)
- Trinidad and Tobago – 17.48%,
- Jamaica – 15.63%,
- United States of America – 8.93%,
- Saint Lucia – 8.13%,
- United Kingdom – 5.36%,
- Saint Vincent and the Grenadines – 5.04%,
- Antigua and Barbuda – 4.12%

=== Berths and terminals ===
The berths and terminals of Bridgetown are laid out as follows:

Berth	Length	Depth	LOA	Draft	Beam	Remarks
	(m)	(m)	(m)	(m)	(m)	
Port of Bridgetown
Breakwater	522	11.5	362.1	—	47.0	Cruise vessels.
No. 1 Cross Berth	152	9.7	134.3	—	20.8	Naval vessels.
No. 2	183	11.0	339.8	—	41.4	Cruise vessels, breakbulk, and containers
No. 3	183	11.0	339.8	—	43.0	Cruise vessels, breakbulk, and containers
No. 4	184	11.0	299.5	—	36.0	Cruise vessels, breakbulk, and containers
No. 5	145	11.0	199.9	—	36.8	Cruise vessels, breakbulk, and containers
Sugar Berth	307	9.7	270.0	—	32.2	Sugar, molasses, and multipurpose
Arawak Cement Works
Cement Berth	37	9.1	138.0	9.0	21.0	Cement. Berthing length of 145m including dolphins
ADM Terminal Bridgetown
ADB Berth	25	11.5	299.5	9.9	35.0	Grain and breakbulk. Berthing length of 160m including dolphins.
Esso Terminal (Deep Water Port)
Esso Jetty	—	13.2	244.0	11.6	31.1	Petroleum products. Berthing length of 70m (including dolphins). Closed
Texaco/Shell (Oistins Bay)
Texaco/Shell CBM	—	11.6	172	10.0	20.8	Petroleum products
Texaco (Spring Garden)
Texaco CBM	—	6.5	103	4.9	19.6	Petroleum products

=== Passenger lines ===
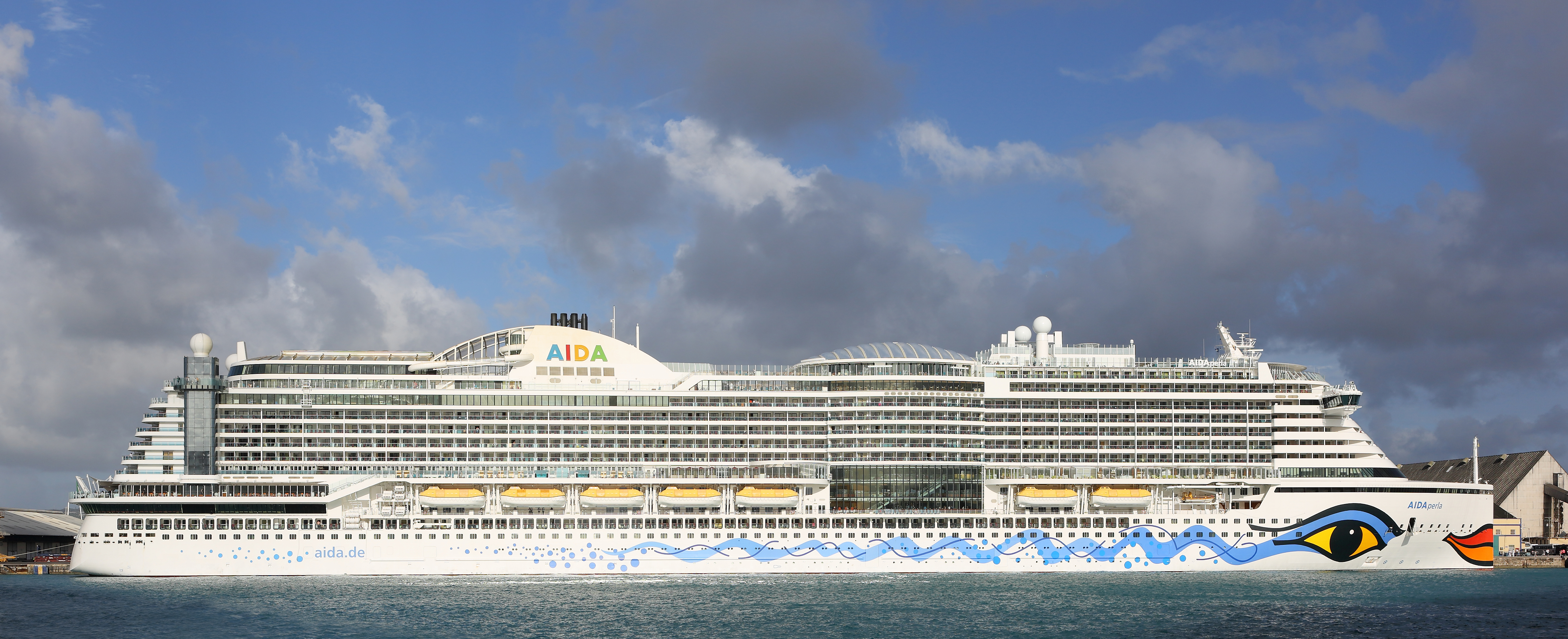
AIDAperla in the port of Bridgetown

The Deep-Water Harbour now acts as a home port for many of the British-based Cruise ship lines operating in the Caribbean region. Some of the Cruise Lines which visit or are home ported at the Deep Water Harbour include:

- Carnival Cruise Line
- Celebrity Cruises
- Club Cruises
- Compagnie Des Iles Du Ponant
- Costa Cruise Line
- Crystal Cruises
- Festival Cruises
- Fred Olsen & Co
- Hanseatic Cruises
- Hapag Lloyd
- Holiday Kreuzfahrten
- Holland America Line
- Majestic Cruise Line
- Maritime Universal
- Norwegian Cruise Line
- Orient Lines
- P&O Princess Cruises
- Passat Ship Management
- Radisson Seven Seas Cruises
- Residensea
- Royal Caribbean International
- Royal Olympic Cruises
- Saga Shipping
- Seabourn/Cunard
- Sea Cloud Cruises
- Seadream Yacht Club Cruises
- Seetours International
- Services Transport
- Silversea Cruises
- Star Clippers
- Sun Cruises
- Swan Hellenic
- Unicom Management
- V-Ships
- Waybell Cruises
- Westria Holdings
- Windjammer Cruises
- Wind Star Cruises

== International sister seaports agreements ==
- – Manzanillo International Terminal, Panama (2014)
- – PortMiami, United States
- – Port of Palm Beach, United States (1998, 2006 and 2019)
- – Port of Tema, Ghana (2019)

== See also ==
- Barbados Coast Guard
- Pelican Island (Barbados)
- Transport in Barbados
- List of busiest cruise ports by passengers
- List of busiest container ports
- List of largest container shipping companies
- List of merchant marine capacity by country
