= Two-lined blind snake =

Conservation status
- Least Concern (IUCN 3.1)

Scientific classification
- Kingdom: Animalia
- Phylum: Chordata
- Class: Reptilia
- Order: Squamata
- Suborder: Serpentes
- Family: Leptotyphlopidae
- Genus: Tetracheilostoma
- Species: T. bilineatum

Binomial name
- Tetracheilostoma bilineatum (Schlegel, 1839)

Synonyms
- Typhlops bilineatus - Schlegel, 1839; Typhlops (Eucephalus) bilineatus - Fitzinger, 1843; Stenostoma bilineatum - A.M.C. Duméril & Bibron, 1844; Epicrata bilineatus - Gray, 1845; St[enostoma]. (Tetracheilostoma) bilineatum - Jan & Sordelli, 1861; S[tenostoma]. (Tetracheilostoma) bilineatum - Jan, 1863; Glauconia bilineata - Boulenger, 1893; Leptotyphlops bilineata - Barbour, 1914; Leptotyphlops bilineatus - Hahn, 1980; Tetracheilostoma bilineatum - Adalsteinsson et al., 2009

Species of snake

The two-lined blind snake (Tetracheilostoma bilineatum) is a harmless blind snake species endemic to Martinique in the Lesser Antilles.

== Distribution ==
Though previously recorded on St. Lucia and Barbados, specimens identified to those islands were described in 2008 as separate species, L. breuili and L. carlae. A specimen identified as from Guadeloupe was reported by Duméril and Bibron (1844:331), but none are known from that island. The type locality given is "Vaterland Martinique."

== Description ==
It is dark brown with two yellow stripes along its sides. It was once known as the world's smallest snake, being small enough to slither through a pencil if the lead were removed. Its typical length is 11 cm (4.5 in). However, the newly described L. carlae (Hedges, 2008) is reported to be even smaller.
