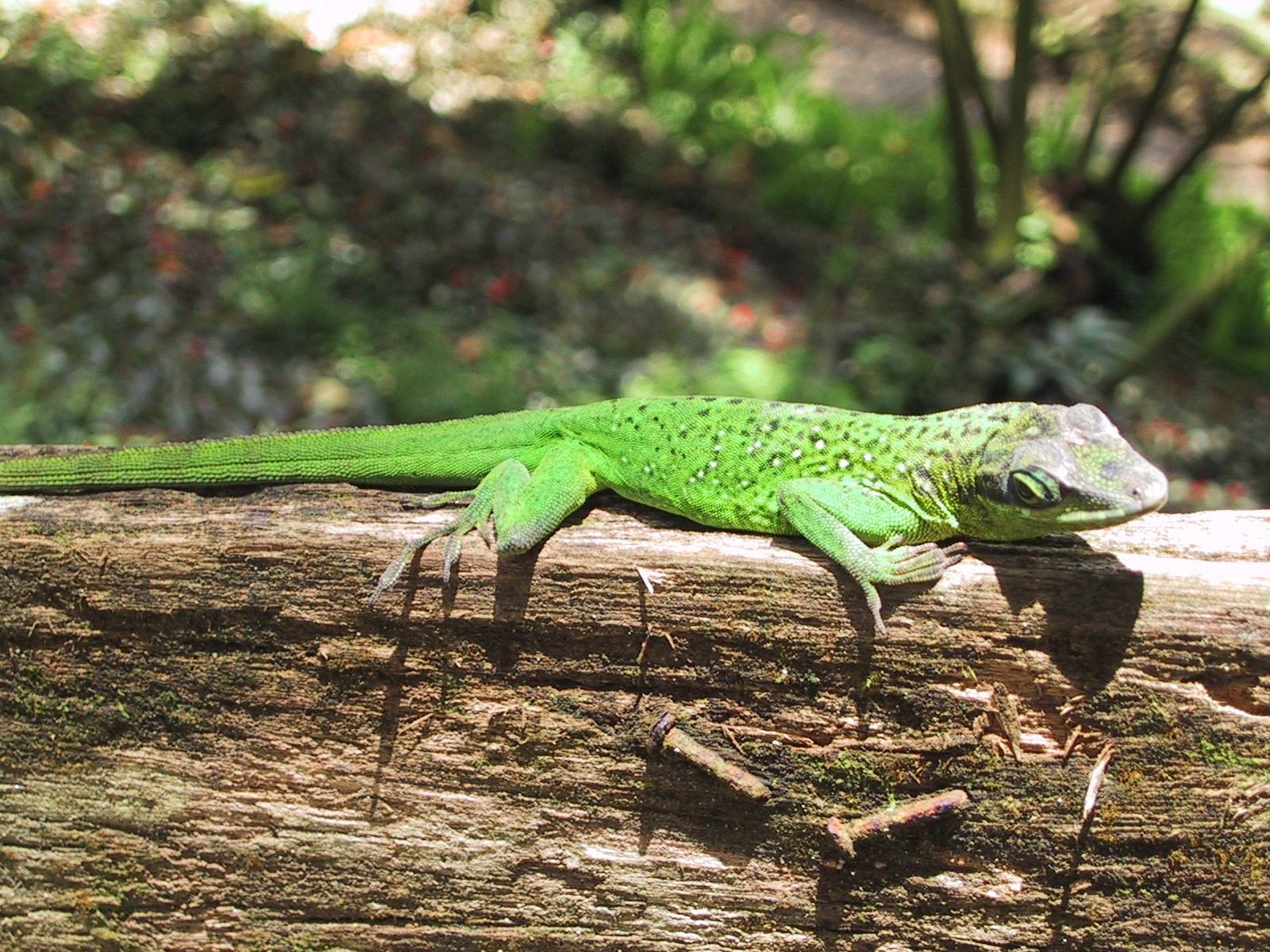

Conservation status
- Least Concern (IUCN 3.1)

Scientific classification
- Kingdom: Animalia
- Phylum: Chordata
- Class: Reptilia
- Order: Squamata
- Suborder: Iguania
- Family: Dactyloidae
- Genus: Anolis
- Species: A. roquet

Binomial name
- Anolis roquet (Lacépède, 1788)

Subspecies
- 6, see text

Synonyms
- Lacerta roquet Lacépède, 1788; Anolis martinicensis Suckow, 1798; Anolis cepedii Merrem, 1820; Anolis goudotii A.M.C. Duméril & Bibron, 1837; Anolis alligator A.M.C. Duméril & Bibron, 1837; Dactyloa goudotii – Fitzinger, 1843 (fide Boulenger, 1885); Ptychonotus fasciatus Fitzinger, 1843 (fide Boulenger, 1885); Anolis roquet – Ruthven, 1923

= Anolis roquet =

Species of lizard

Anolis roquet, also called Martinique anole, Martinique's anole, or savannah anole, is a species of anole lizard. It is endemic to the island of Martinique, located in the Caribbean Lesser Antilles.

Anolis roquet shows differences in color and body shape across Martinique, depending on where it lives, which reflects adaptation to local environments and some separation between populations. Its dorsal surface ranges from green to gray-green, brown, or gray brown, with some populations also having areas of blue-green color. Its ventral and dewlap colors also vary. Its markings include dark marbling, spots, and chevrons; and light markings including flank stripes.

It is unusual among anoles in having a voice; it can make a squeaking noise when it is caught.

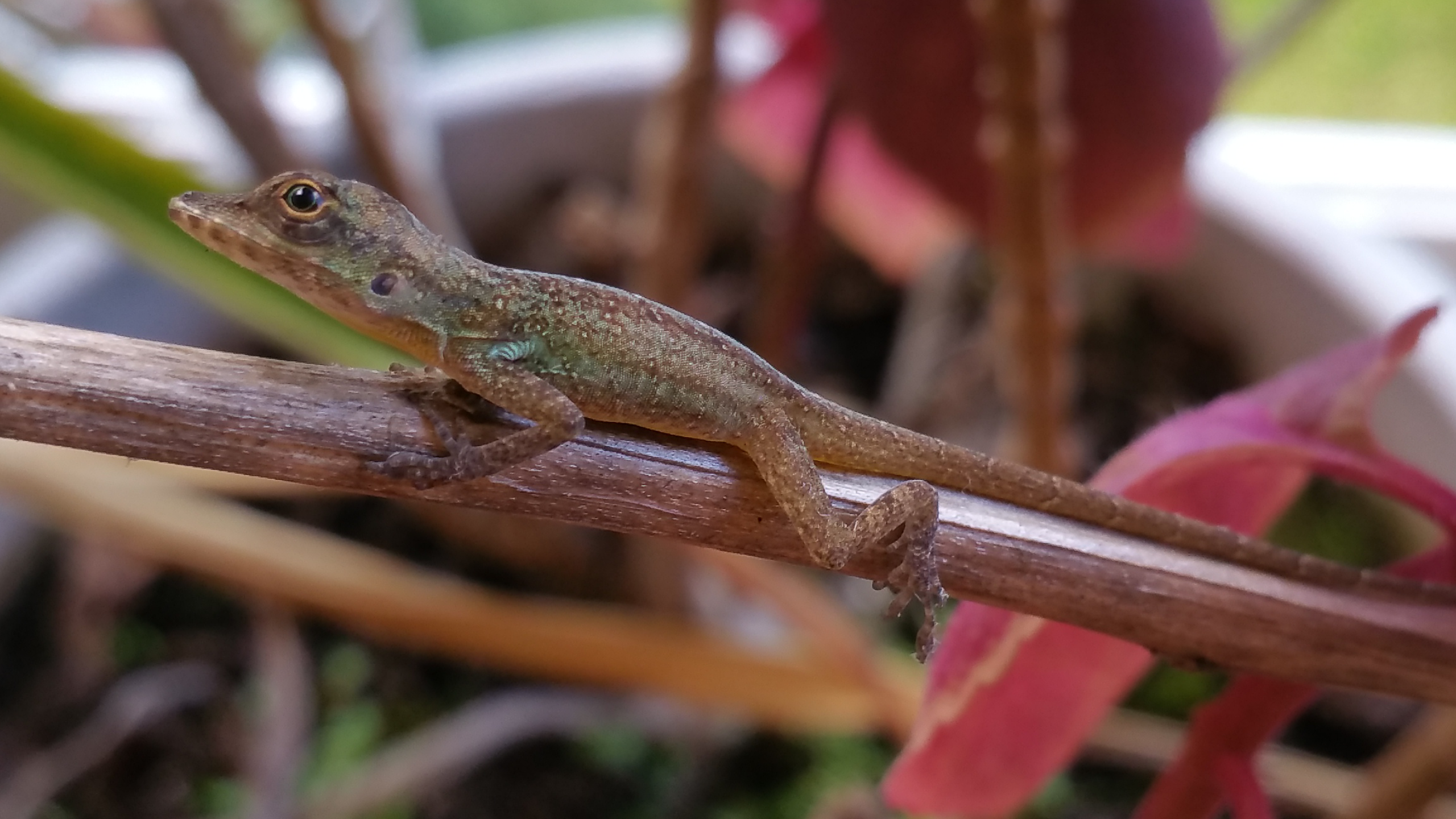
Juvenile

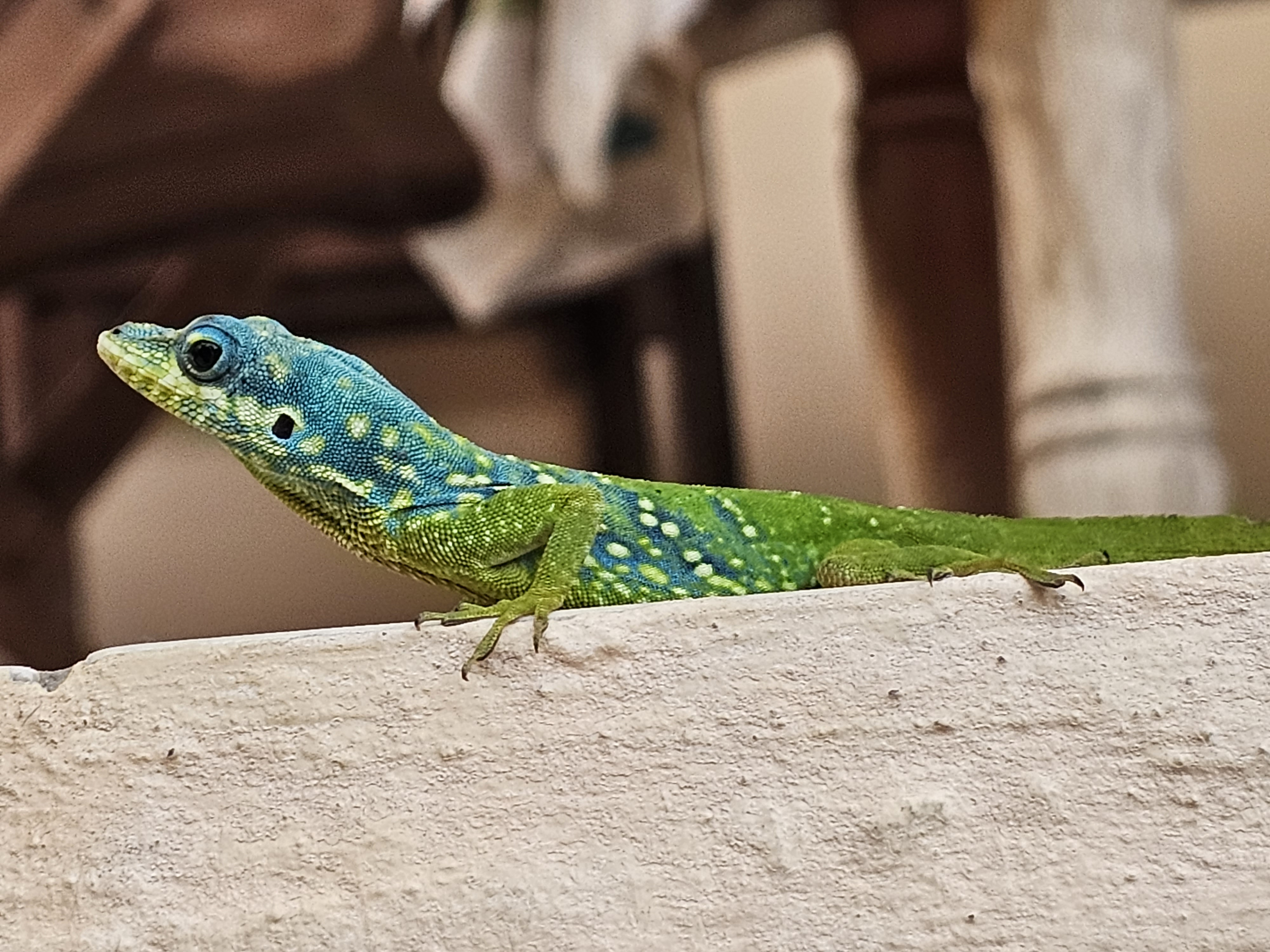
Adult

The subspecies are:

- Anolis roquet roquet (Lacépède, 1788)
- Anolis roquet caracoli Lazell, 1972
- Anolis roquet majolgris Lazell, 1972
- Anolis roquet salinei Lazell, 1972
- Anolis roquet summus Lazell, 1972
- Anolis roquet zebrilus Lazell, 1972

The Barbados anole (A. extremus) was formerly included here as another subspecies.
