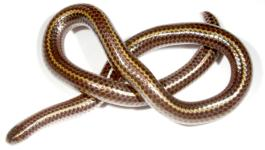
- St. Lucia threadsnake (Tetracheilostoma breuili)

Scientific classification
- Kingdom: Animalia
- Phylum: Chordata
- Class: Reptilia
- Order: Squamata
- Suborder: Serpentes
- Family: Leptotyphlopidae
- Subfamily: Epictinae
- Genus: Tetracheilostoma; Jan, 1861

= Tetracheilostoma =

Genus of snakes

Tetracheilostoma is a genus of snakes in the family Leptotyphlopidae. All of the species were previously placed in the genus Leptotyphlops.

The genus contains the following species:

- Tetracheilostoma bilineatum, two-lined blind snake
- Tetracheilostoma breuili, St. Lucia threadsnake
- Tetracheilostoma carlae, Barbados threadsnake
