= Westbury Cemetery =

Cemetery in Bridgetown, Barbados

Coordinates: 13°06′35″N 59°37′15″W

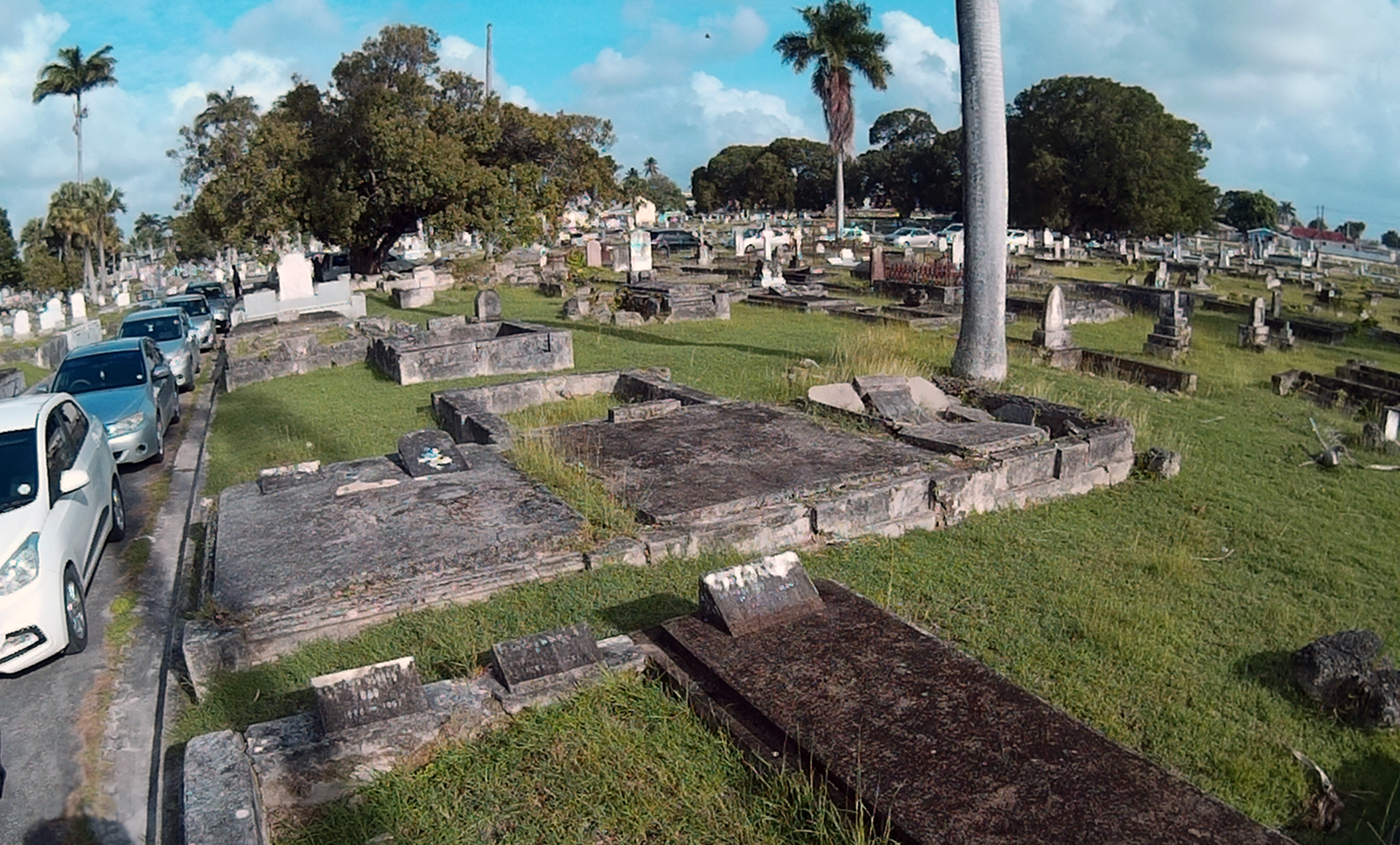
Westbury Cemetery is 35 acres in extent.

Westbury Cemetery is a public cemetery in Bridgetown, Saint Michael parish, Barbados, 35 acres in extent. It is administered by the local Sanitation Service Authority. Records date to 1877. It is a Commonwealth War Graves Commission cemetery and within it are the remains of nine veterans of World War I or World War II. Cemetery records are held by the Barbados Museum & Historical Society.

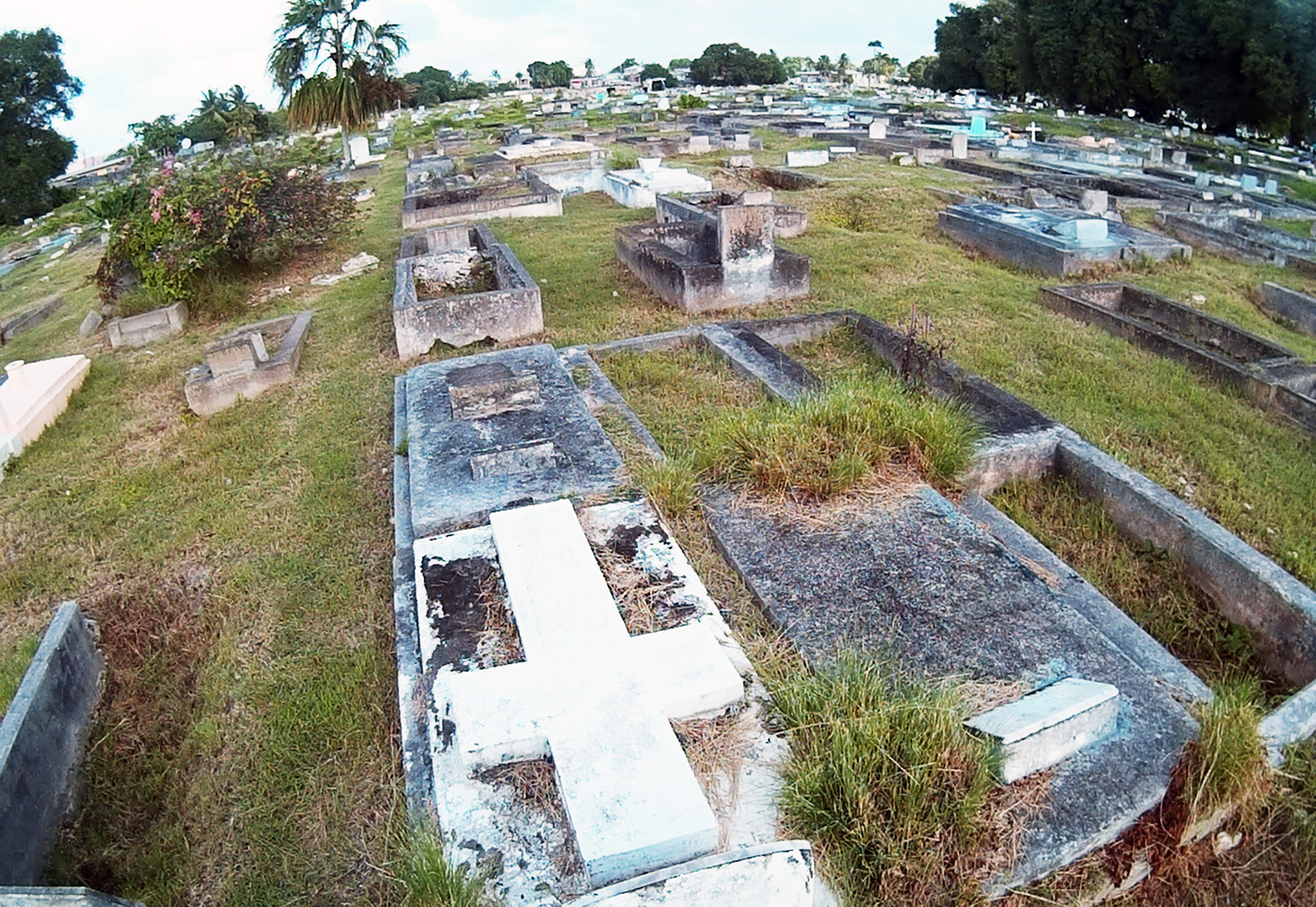
Biggest public cemetery in Barbados

The cemetery is located close to the childhood home of Rihanna and Kensington Oval.

== Interrments ==
- Eunice Gibson, founder of the Barbados Nurses Association

== Gallery ==
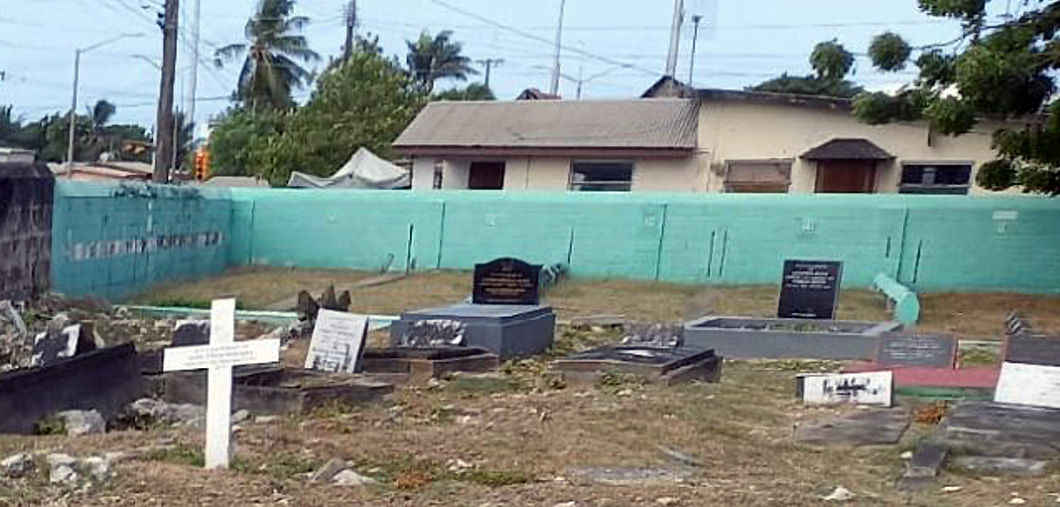
Islamic section of Westbury Cemetery.

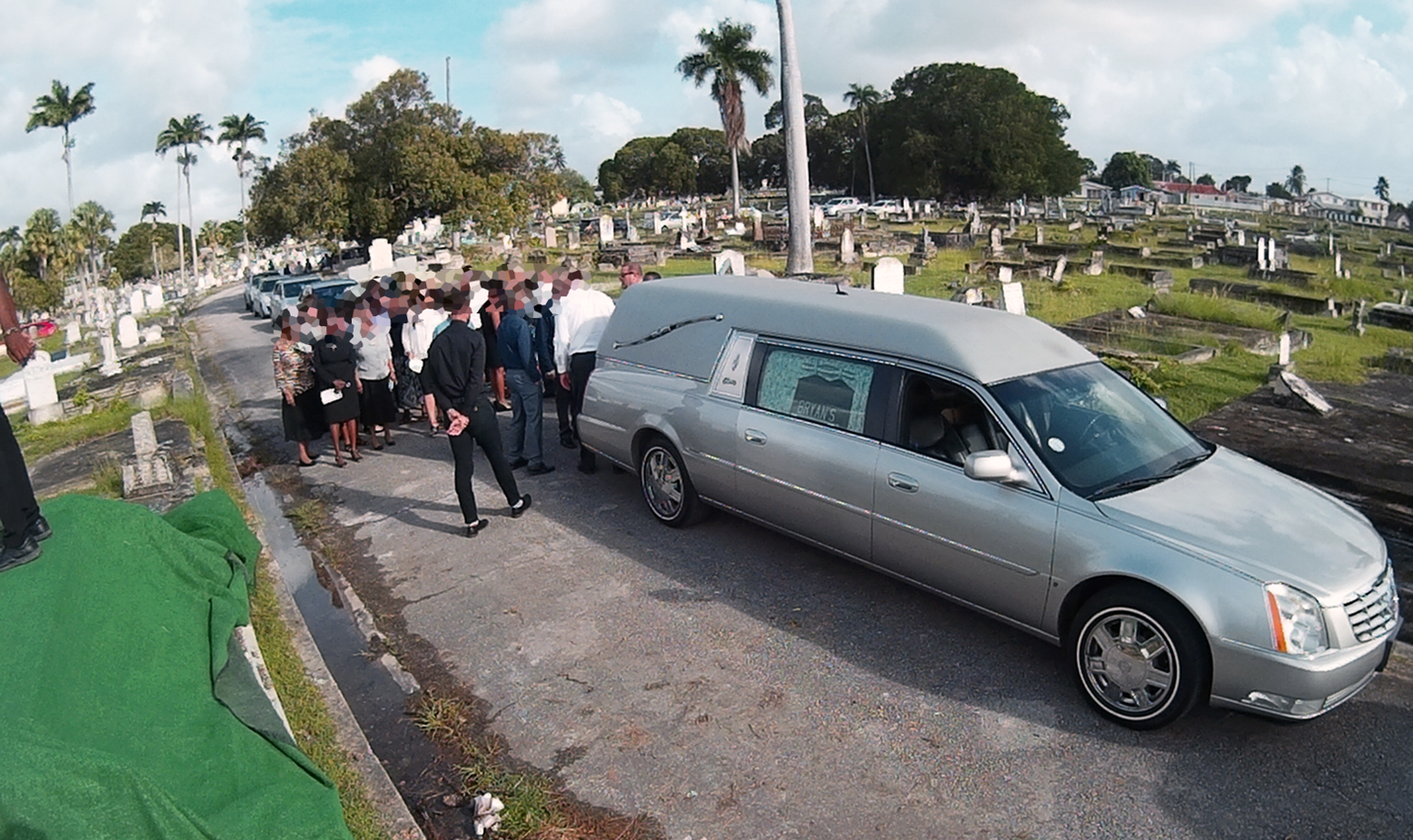
Westbury Cemetery in Barbados..

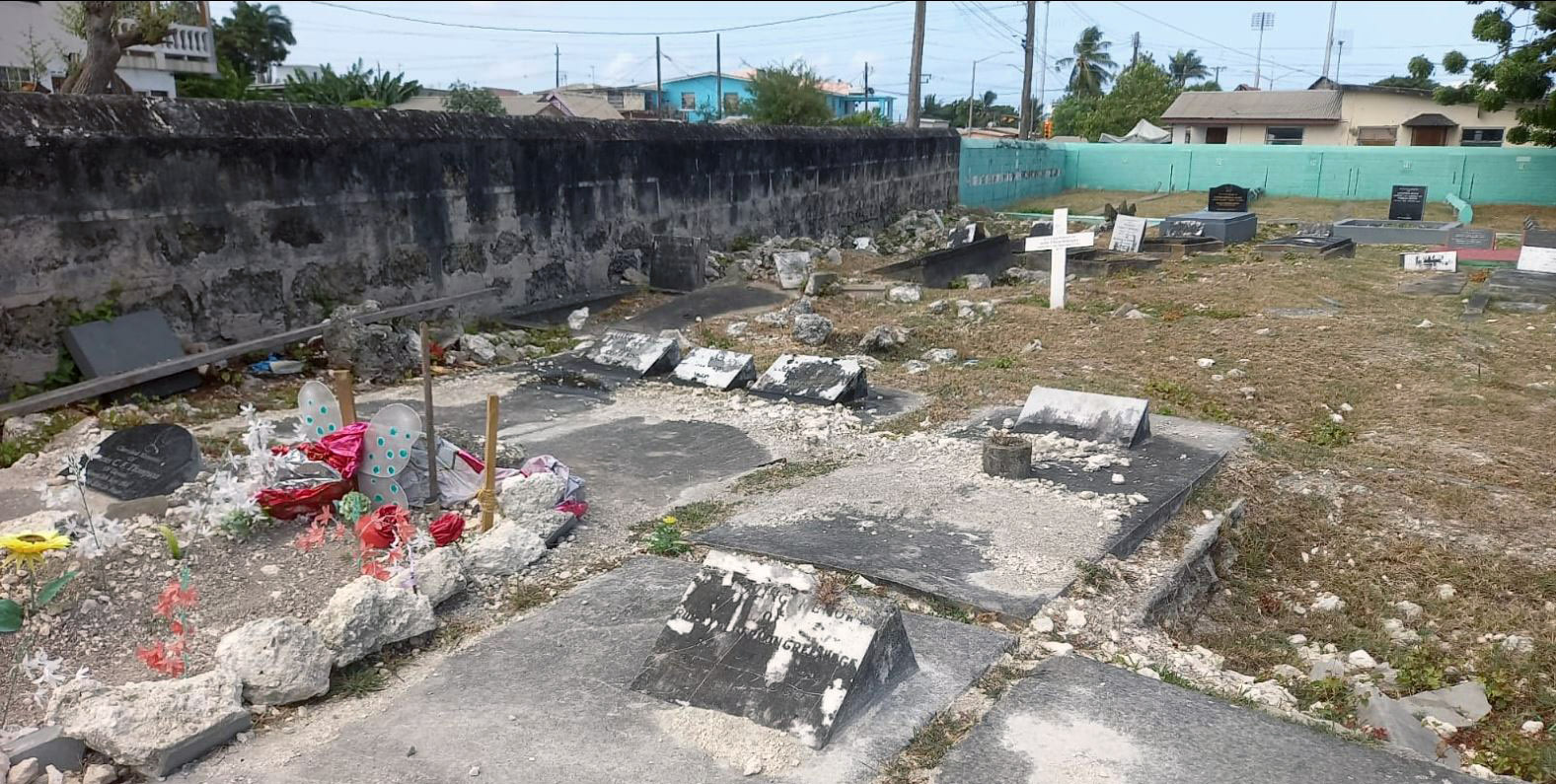
South-Eastern section of Westbury Cemetery
