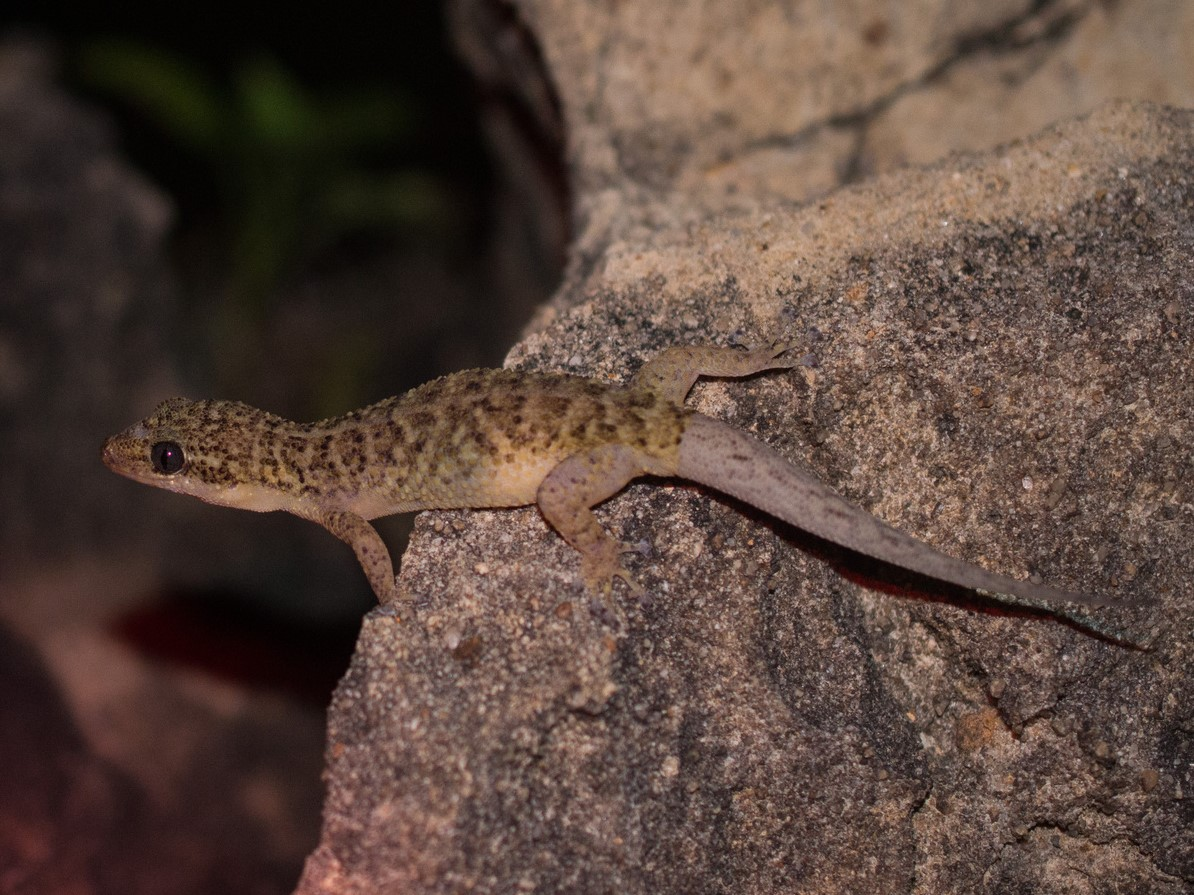

Conservation status
- Critically Endangered (IUCN 3.1)

Scientific classification
- Domain: Eukaryota
- Kingdom: Animalia
- Phylum: Chordata
- Class: Reptilia
- Order: Squamata
- Infraorder: Gekkota
- Family: Phyllodactylidae
- Genus: Phyllodactylus
- Species: P. pulcher

Binomial name
- Phyllodactylus pulcher Gray, 1830

Synonyms
- Phyllodactylus spatulatus - Cope, 1863

= Barbados leaf-toed gecko =

Species of lizard

The Barbados leaf-toed gecko (Phyllodactylus pulcher) is a species of gecko endemic to the Caribbean island-nation of Barbados. It is the only known leaf-toed gecko in the Lesser Antilles.

It has a maximum snout-to-vent length of 62 mm. It has a cream ground color, with a dark line extending from its nostril, through its eye, to its shoulder. Its dorsal surface has variable markings: either brown mottling, broad brown crossbands, or longitudinal brown lines.

Little is known about the species' habits and distribution. It is presumed nocturnal, arboreal, and insectivorous. It is considered rare, with few known localities, but its range has not yet been systematically studied.

This once presumed extinct species was rediscovered in 2011 on the outcrop known as Culpepper Island by Damon Gerard Corrie, the founder and first president of the Barbados Herpetological Society.
