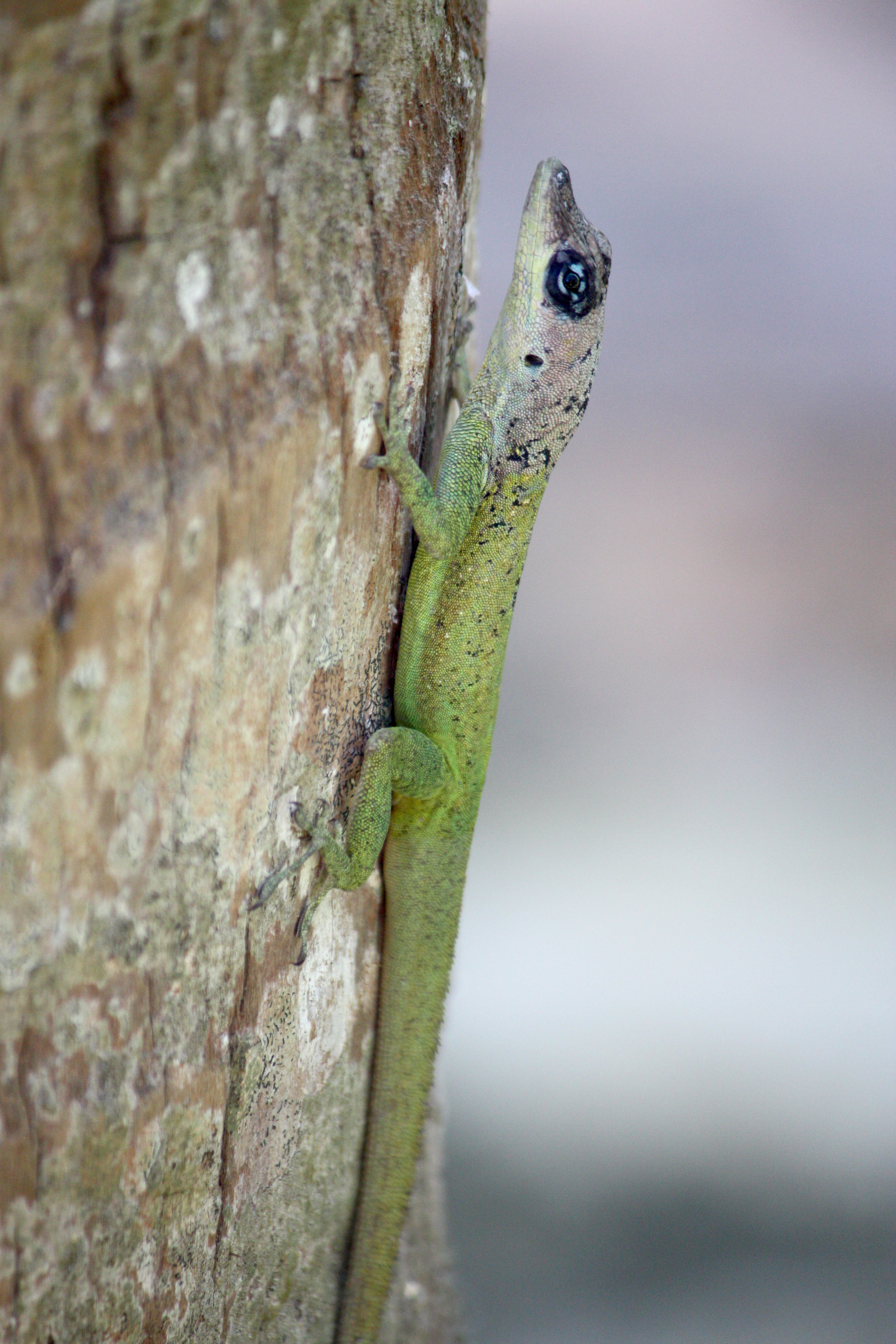
- A male Barbados anole, Andromeda Botanical Gardens, Barbados

Conservation status
- Least Concern (IUCN 3.1)

Scientific classification
- Kingdom: Animalia
- Phylum: Chordata
- Class: Reptilia
- Order: Squamata
- Suborder: Iguania
- Family: Anolidae
- Genus: Anolis
- Species: A. extremus

Binomial name
- Anolis extremus Garman, 1887

Synonyms
- Anolis roquet var. extremus Garman, 1887; Anolis roquet extremus Garman, 1887; Dactyloa extrema (Garman, 1887)

= Barbados anole =

Species of lizard

The Barbados anole (Anolis extremus) is a species of lizard belonging to the family Dactyloidae, the anoles. This species was formerly restricted to Barbados, but it has been introduced elsewhere around the Caribbean Sea.

== Taxonomy ==
The Barbados anole was first formally described as Anolis roquet var extremus, a variety of the Martinique anole, in 1887 by the American zoologist Samuel Garman, with its type locality given as Bridgetown, Barbados. This species is a member of the Anolis roquet species complex of the anole family, the Dactyloidae.

== Description ==
The Barbados anole is a relatively large, tree-dwelling anole. The males can have a snout-vent length of 85 mm (3.3 in). The background colour is mossy green with dark brown or black markings and occasionally light spots, mostly in the anterior half of the body. The anterior half sometimes also shows a lavender or grey tint, and the head may be blue grey or lavender. There is a dark ring around the eye in males, and the flap on the throat is yellow or orange. The females are smaller and reach a snout-vent length of 60 mm (2.4 in). Their colours are less intense and they may have stripes along the back.

== Distribution and habitat ==
The Barbados anole was formerly endemic to Barbados, where it is the only species of native anole. It has been introduced to Bermuda, Saint Lucia, Trinidad and Tobago, Florida and Venezuela, but it does not appear to have established sustained populations in Florida or Trinidad and Tobago. On Barbados, it is found throughout the island in all habitats except grassland, where it is invasive it tends to be found near human habitation and to avoid native habitats.

== Biology ==
The Barbados anole is oviparous. Each female lays and buries one or two eggs in a shallow nest in the soil.

This is an omnivorous species, and has been seen to eat invertebrates and the occasional fruit. The Barbados anole is an ambush predator which scans for prey on the ground or in the undergrowth from positions on tree trunks, branches and bushes.

== See also ==
- List of Anolis lizards
