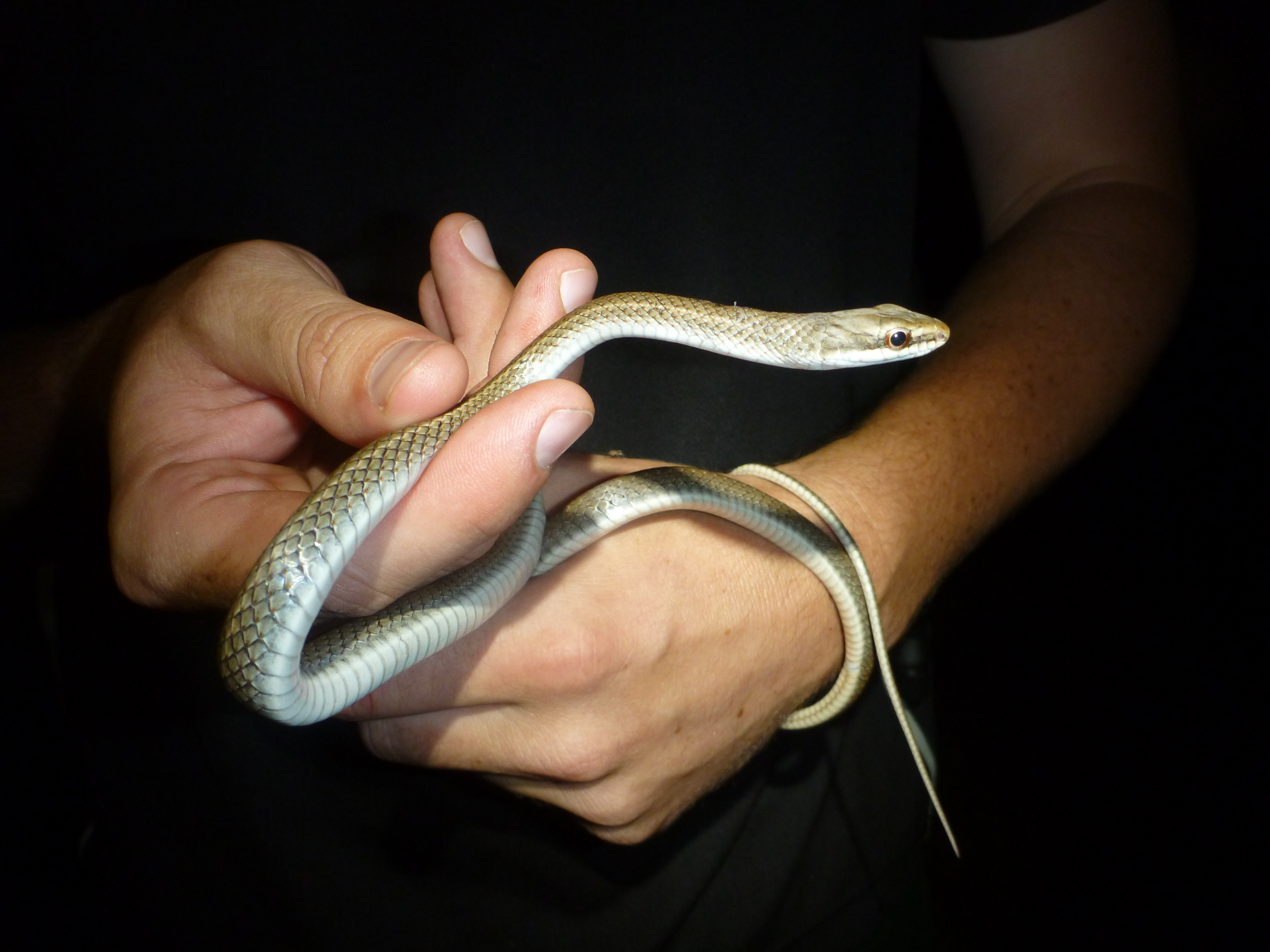
- Picture taken in Lance Aux Epines, Grenada, West Indies.

Conservation status
- Least Concern (IUCN 3.1)

Scientific classification
- Kingdom: Animalia
- Phylum: Chordata
- Class: Reptilia
- Order: Squamata
- Suborder: Serpentes
- Family: Colubridae
- Genus: Mastigodryas
- Species: M. bruesi

Binomial name
- Mastigodryas bruesi (Barbour, 1914)

Synonyms
- Alsophis bruesi Barbour, 1914; Mastigodryas bruesi — Schwartz & Henderson, 1991

= Barbour's tropical racer =

Species of snake

Barbour's tropical racer (Mastigodryas bruesi) is a species of snake in the family Colubridae. The species is endemic to the Caribbean.

== Etymology ==
The specific name, bruesi, is in honor of American entomologist Charles Thomas Brues, who was one of the collectors of the holotype.

== Geographic range ==
M. bruesi is native to Saint Vincent and the Grenadines, and Grenada.

== Description ==
M. bruesi can reach a snout-to-vent length (SVL) of about 83 cm (33 in). Dorsally, it is blue-gray to brown, with lighter lateral stripes. Ventrally, it is whitish.

== Behavior and diet ==
M. bruesi is diurnal, hunting frogs and lizards.

== Habitat ==
The preferred natural habitat of M. bruesi is forest, both mesic and xeric. It can be found on the ground, and in bushes, where it sleeps at night.

== Reproduction ==
M. bruesi is oviparous.

== Locality records ==
M. bruesi has been recorded in the southwest corner of Saint Vincent and is widespread all over the Grenadines islands. It is also found on the southern half of Grenada, which is the furthest south it is distributed. It has been introduced to Barbados, probably around thirty years ago, where it has been incorrectly identified as Liophis perfuscus.

== Sources ==
- Government of Barbados (2002). A National Biodiversity Strategy & Action Plan for Barbados. p. 55. Archived from the original on September 28, 2007..
- Malhotra, Anita; Thorpe, Roger S. (1999). Reptiles & Amphibians of the Eastern Caribbean. Macmillan Education Ltd. pp. 101, 104, 107. ISBN 0-333-69141-5..
- Powell, Robert; Henderson, Robert W. (2005). "Conservation Status of Lesser Antillean Reptiles". Iguana. 12 (2): 63–77.
