= Barbados racer =

Conservation status
- Extinct (IUCN 3.1)

Scientific classification
- Kingdom: Animalia
- Phylum: Chordata
- Class: Reptilia
- Order: Squamata
- Suborder: Serpentes
- Family: Colubridae
- Genus: Erythrolamprus
- Species: †E. perfuscus

Binomial name
- †Erythrolamprus perfuscus (Cope, 1862)

Synonyms
- Liophis perfuscus Cope, 1862; Dromicus perfuscus (Cope, 1862)

Extinct species of snake

The Barbados racer (Erythrolamprus perfuscus), also commonly known as the tan ground snake, is an extinct species of snake in the family Colubridae. It was endemic to Barbados, and was last recorded there in 1963 .

== Description ==
It grew to a total length of 1 m (39 in), which included a tail 20 cm (7.9 in) long. It was colored brown with lighter sides, and light lateral stripes to the rear.

== Habitat, behavior, and diet ==
The Barbados racer was an egg-laying species that lived in mesic habitats, and actively foraged during the day for lizards and frogs.

== History ==
This species was often believed to be the snake described by Richard Ligon in his "A True and Exact History of the Island of Barbadoes" (1657):

"Having done with Beasts and Birds, we will enquire what other lesser Animalls or Insects there are upon the Iland, of which, Snakes are the chiefe, because the largest; and I have seen some of those a yard and a halfe long."

The first description of the species was published in by Edward Drinker Cope in 1862. By 1889, the species population had begun to decline, with Henry Wemyss Feilden reporting that the snake was rare, and in 1930 Thomas Barbour reported the species to be extinct. In 1963, M.G. Emsley reported that he had discovered the species living in the northeastern part of Barbados, and that it was common in that area; however, this would be the last recorded sighting of the snake.

The history of the Barbados racer is in part obscured due to it likely having been mixed up with Barbour's tropical racer by past writers.

== Conservation status ==
The Barbados racer was declared extinct in 2016 as the last confirmed sighting was in 1963. Later reported sightings stem from confusing Barbour's tropical racer for the Barbados racer. Habitat loss, particularly the land clearance and pesticide use associated with tree crops, and predation by mongooses, cats and rats and the introduction of Barbour's tropical racer to Barbados have been suggested as factors behind the decline of the Barbados racer.
