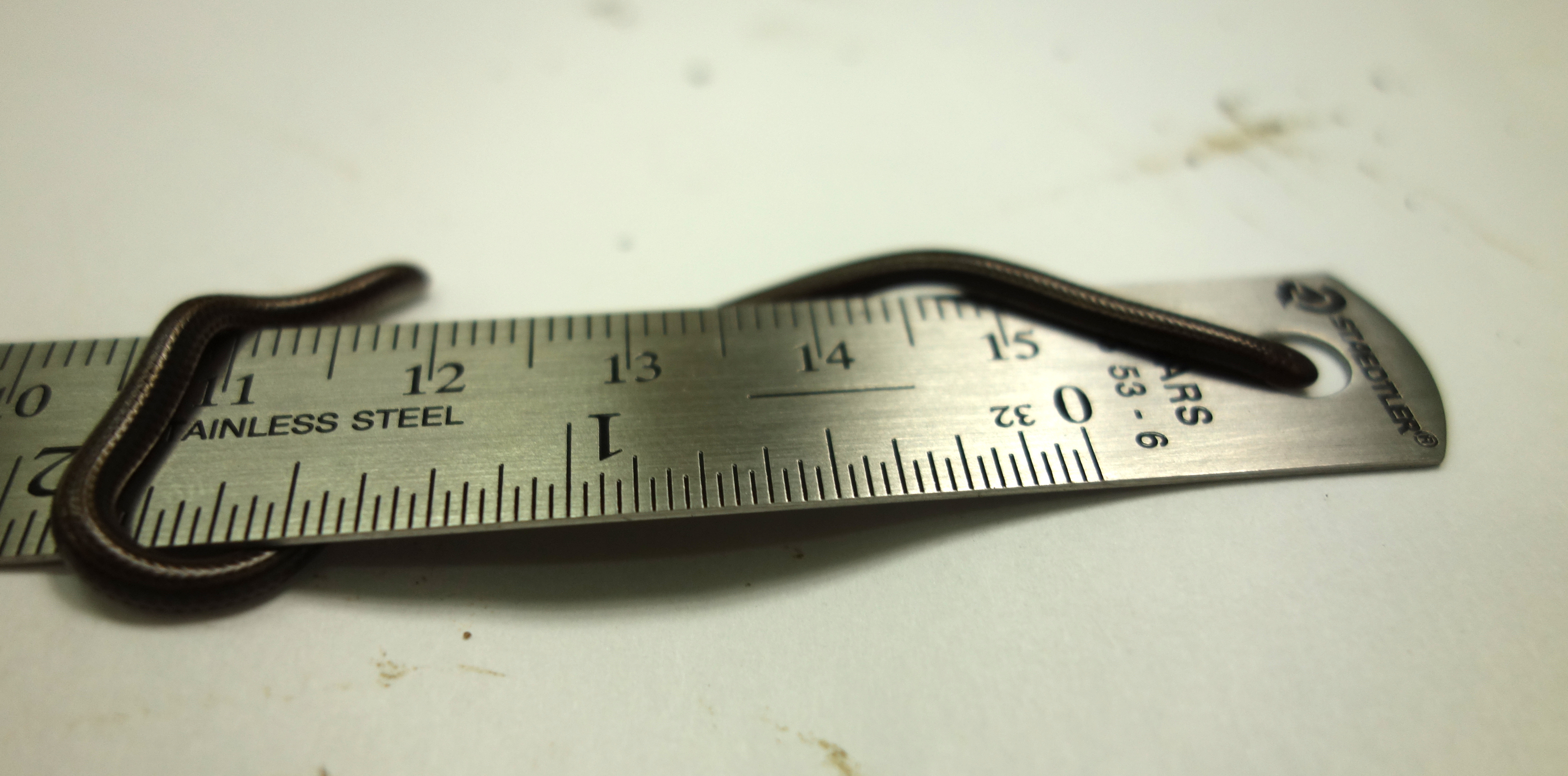

Conservation status
- Critically Endangered (IUCN 3.1)

Scientific classification
- Kingdom: Animalia
- Phylum: Chordata
- Class: Reptilia
- Order: Squamata
- Suborder: Serpentes
- Family: Leptotyphlopidae
- Genus: Tetracheilostoma
- Species: T. carlae

Binomial name
- Tetracheilostoma carlae (Hedges, 2008)

Synonyms
- Leptotyphlops carlae Hedges, 2008; Tetracheilostoma carlae — Adalsteinsson et al., 2009; Leptotyphlops carlae — Lillywhite, 2014; Tetracheilostoma carlae — Wallach et al., 2014

= Barbados threadsnake =

Species of snake

The Barbados threadsnake (Tetracheilostoma carlae) is a species of snake endemic to Barbados, thought to be one of the smallest snakes in the world.

== Taxonomy and etymology ==
The Barbados threadsnake was first identified as a separate species in 2008 by S. Blair Hedges, a herpetologist from Pennsylvania State University. Hedges named the new species of snake in honor of his wife, Carla Ann Hass, a herpetologist who was part of the discovery team. Specimens already existed in reference collections in the London Natural History Museum and in a museum in California, but they had been incorrectly identified to belong to another species.

At the time of publication, August 2008, T. carlae was described as the snake species with the smallest adults in the world. The first scientific specimens taken by the research team were found under rocks in a forest. The snake is thought to be near the lower size limit for snakes, as young snakes need to attain a certain minimum size to find suitable food.

== Description ==
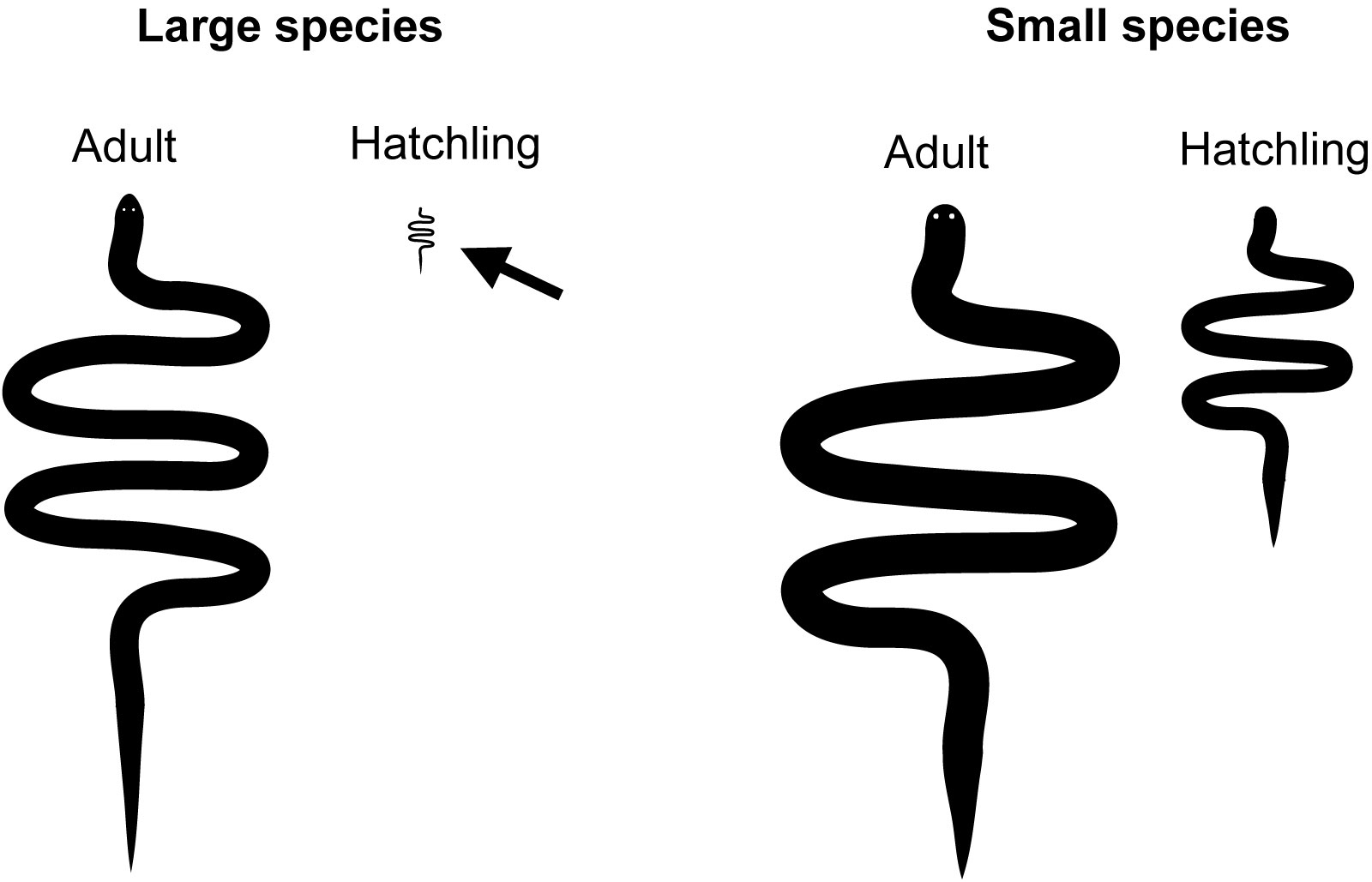
The size of mother-to-offspring of large species of snakes (left) compared to small species such as L. carlae (right)

The average total length (including tail) of T. carlae adults is approximately 10 cm (3.94 inches), with the largest specimen found to date measuring 10.4 cm (4.09 inches) in total length. The snake is said by Hedges to be "about as wide as a spaghetti noodle."

T. carlae is distinguished from the similar Indotyphlops braminus by its dorsal lines and shorter length.

== Diet ==
T. carlae is thought to feed primarily on a diet of termites and ant larvae.

== Reproduction ==
Threadsnakes (Leptotyphlopidae) are oviparous, laying eggs to reproduce. The female of this snake species, T. carlae, produces only one large egg at a time. The emerging offspring is about half the length of the mother.

Small species of snakes such as T. carlae have relatively large new-born offspring compared to adults. The offspring of the largest snakes are only one-tenth the length of an adult, whereas offspring of the smallest snakes typically are one-half the length of an adult (see figure).

== Conservation status ==
Little is known about the ecology, abundance, or distribution of this species, T. carlae. Essentially, Barbados has no original forest remaining, however, this native species very likely requires a forest habitat for survival since it evolved in the presence of forests. Based on the small number of known specimens and its distribution apparently being restricted to eastern Barbados, the continued survival of the species is a concern.

The snake's small size has made it difficult to find or observe in the wild, and it was declared "lost to science" by the conservation group Re:wild. It was rediscovered on March 20, 2025, after almost two decades where no specimens had been identified. A project officer from the Barbados Ministry of Environment, Connor Blades, found the snake under a rock and identified it with a microscope. The discovery was announced on July 23, 2025.

== See also ==
- Smallest organisms
