= Music of Barbados =

The music of Barbados includes distinctive national styles of folk and popular music, including elements of Western classical and religious music. The culture of Barbados is a syncretic mix of African and British elements, and the island's music reflects this mix through song types and styles, instrumentation, dances, and aesthetic principles.

Barbadian folk traditions include the Landship movement, which is a satirical, informal organization based on the Royal Navy, tea meetings, tuk bands and numerous traditional songs and dances. In modern Barbados, popular styles include calypso, spouge, contemporary folk and world music. Barbados is, along with Guadeloupe, Martinique, Trinidad, Cuba, Puerto Rico, and the Virgin Islands, one of the few centres for Caribbean jazz.

== Characteristics and musical identity ==
"Boots"
Song by well-known calypsonian Mighty Gabby

"The Big Bamboo"
Song by long-running popular calypso group The Merrymen

"Sweat"
Song by well-known singer Hypasounds

"Jump"
Popular song by ragga-soca artist Rupee (a remake of Shout by The Isley Brothers)

"La La"
Popular song by soca artist Red Plastic Bag

Bajan culture is syncretic, and the island's musical culture is perceived as a mixture of African and British musics, with certain unique elements that may derive from indigenous sources. Tension between African and British culture has long been a major element of Barbadian history, and has included the banning of certain African-derived practices and black Barbadian parodies of British traditions. Simple entertainment is the basis for most Barbadians' participation in music and dance activities, though religious and other functional musics also occur. Barbadian folk culture declined in importance in the 20th century, but then rekindled in the 1970s, when many Barbadians became interested in their national culture and history. This change was heralded by the arrival of spouge, a popular national genre that reflects Barbadian heritage and African origins; spouge helped kindle a resurgence in national pride, and became viewed as Barbados' answer to the popular Caribbean genres reggae and calypso from Jamaica and Trinidad, respectively.

The religious music of the Barbadian Christian churches plays an important role in Barbadian musical identity, especially in urban areas. Many distinctive Barbadian musical and other cultural traditions derive from parodies of Anglican church hymns and British military drills. The British military performed exhibition drills to both provide security for the island's population, as well as intimidate enslaved people. Modern Barbadian tea meetings, tuk bands, the Landship tradition and many folk songs come from enlaved community members parodying the practices of white authorities. British-Barbadians used music for cultural and intellectual enrichment and to feel a sense of kinship and connection with the British Isles through the maintenance of British musical forms. Plantation houses featured music as entertainment at balls, dances and other gatherings. For Afro-Barbadians, drum, vocal and dance music was an integral part of everyday life, and songs and performance practices were created for normal, everyday events, as well as special celebrations including Whitsuntide, Christmas, Easter, Landship and Crop Over. These songs remain a part of Barbadian culture and form a rich folk repertoire.

Western classical music is the most socially accepted form of musical expression for Barbadians in Bridgetown, including a variety of vocal music, chamber and orchestral music, and piano and violin. Along with hymns, oratorios, cantatas and other religious music, chamber music of the Western tradition remains an important part of Barbadian music through an integral role in the services of the Anglican church.

== History ==
Though inhabited prior to the 16th century, little is known about Barbadian music before the arrival of the Portuguese in 1536 and then the English in 1627. The Portuguese left little influence, but English culture and music helped shape the island's heritage. Irish and Scottish settlers emigrated in the 17th century, working in the tobacco industry, bringing still more new music to the island. The middle of the 17th century saw the decline of the tobacco industry and the rise of sugarcane, as well as the introduction of large numbers of enslaved Africans. Brazilian exiles however, along with sugarcane introduced Samba to the island which featured a mixture of Latin music with African influences which soon developed into Soca-Samba which is indigenous to Barbados. Modern Barbadian music is thus largely a combination of English and African elements, with Irish, Scottish, and modern American and Caribbean (especially Jamaican) influences as well.

By the 19th century, the Barbadian colonialists grew to fear slave revolts, and specifically, the use of music as a tool of communication and planning for revolution. As a result, the government passed laws to restrict musical activities among the enslaved population. At the same time, American and other forms of imported music were brought to Barbados, while many important elements of modern Barbadian music, such as tuk bands, also emerged. In the 20th century, many new styles were imported to Barbados, most influentially including jazz, ska, reggae, calypso and soca. Barbados became home to many performers of these new genres, especially soca and calypso, while the island also produced an indigenous style called spouge, which became an important symbol of Barbadian identity.

== Folk music ==
Barbadian culture and music are mixtures of European and African elements, with minimal influence from the indigenous peoples of the island, about whom little is known. Significant numbers of Asian, specifically Chinese and Japanese, people have moved to Barbados, but their music is unstudied and has had little impact on Barbadian music.

The earliest reference to Afro-Barbadian music may come from a description of a slave rebellion, in which the rebels were inspired to fight by music played on skin drums, conch trumpets and animal horns. Slavery continued, however, and the colonial and slave-owning authorities eventually outlawed musical instruments among enslaved labourers. By the end of the 17th century, a distinctly Barbadian folk culture developed, based around influences and instruments from Africa, Britain and other Caribbean islands.

Early Barbadian folk music, despite legal restrictions, was a major part of life among the island's enslaved population. For enslaved people, music was "essential for recreation and dancing and as a part of the life cycle for communication and religious meaning". African musicians also provided the music for the white landowners' private parties, while the enslaved people developed their own party music, culminating in the crop over festival, which began in 1688. The earliest crop over festivals featured dancing and call-and-response singing accompanied by shak-shak, banjo, bones and bottles containing varying amounts of water.

=== Folk song ===
Barbadian traditional folk songs are heavily influenced by the music of England. Many traditional songs concern events current at the time of their composition, such as the emancipation of the enslave people of Barbados, and the coronations of Victoria, George V, and Elizabeth II; this song tradition dates back to 1650. The most influential Barbadian folk songs are associated with the island's lower-class labourers, who have held on to their folk heritage.

Some Barbadian songs and stories made their way back to England, most famously "Inckle the English Sailor" and "Yarico the Indian Maid", which became English plays and an opera by George Coleman with music by Samuel Arnold, and first performed in London in 1787.

Contemporary Barbadian folk songs, especially through the pioneering albums of author and singer-songwriter Anthony Kellman, show a bold fusion of indigenous rhythms such as tuk and calypso with African, Latin, jazz, pop, and East Indian influences. Kellman's songs such as "Mountain" (from 2000 album Wings of A Stranger); "King Jaja" and "My Dog, Your Dog" (from 2005 album Limestone); and "If You See My Girl" and "Tuk, Tabla, and Fedounoum" (from 2009 album Blood Mates), exemplify his eclectic style. More than any of his contemporaries, Kellman, through his songs, poems and novels, demonstrates what it means to be Barbadian through a hybrid mix of African and European cultural elements.

=== Dance ===
Barbadian folk dances include a wide variety of styles, performed at Landship, holidays and other occasions. Dancers and other performers at the crop over festivals, for example, are popular and an iconic part of Barbadian culture, known for dancing in the costumes of sugarcane-cutters. The Landship movement features song and dance meant to imitate the passage of a Royal Navy ship through rough seas; Landship and other occasions also feature African-derived improvised and complexly-rhythmic dances, and British hornpipes, jigs, maypole dances and Marches.

The "Jean and Johnnie" dance was an important part of Barbadian culture until it was banned in the 19th century. This was a popular fertility dance performed outdoors at plantation fairs and other festivals, and was functional in that it allowed women to show off to men and, more rarely, vice versa. The dance was eventually banned because it was associated with non-Christian African traditions.

=== Instrumentation ===
The Barbadian folk tradition is home to a great variety of musical instruments, imported from Africa, Great Britain or other Caribbean islands. The most central instrument group in Barbadian culture is the percussion instruments. These include numerous drums, among them the pump and the tum tum, made from a hollowed-out tree trunk, the side snare drum and a double-headed bass drum of tuk bands. Folk musicians also use gongs made from tree trunks, bones, rook jaw, triangle, cymbals, bottles filled with water, and xylophones. Rattles are also widespread, and include the pan-Antillean shak-shak and the calabash, de shot and rattle. More recently imported folk percussion instruments include the conga and bongo from Puerto Rico, Dominican Republic and Cuba, and the tambourine.

String and wind instruments play an important role in Barbadian folk culture, especially the bow-fiddle, banjo and acoustic guitar; more modern groups also use an electric and bass guitar. The shukster is a distinctive instrument, made by stretching a guitar string between two sides of a house. Traditional Barbadian wind instruments are largely metal, but in their folk origins, were made out of locally found materials. Barbadian villagers burned fingerholes, for example, on bamboo tubes, made trumpets out of conch shells and pipes from pumpkin vines. Many modern groups use harmonica, accordion, alto and tenor saxophone, trumpet and trombone.

=== Religious music ===
Though Western classical and other musics play an important role in Anglican church services on Barbados, religion and folk music are closely intertwined in the everyday lives of most Barbadians. The basis for religious folk music is the Anglican hymn, a kind of praise song mostly sung on Sundays, a day when Christian Barbadians come together with family members to sing and praise God to ask for strength for the next week's work.

Pentecostal music has become a part of Barbadian religious and musical traditions since the 1920s. Music plays a role in Pentecostal ceremonies, and is provided by emotional and improvised performances accompanied tambourines. In addition to the Anglican and Pentecostal traditions, Rastafarian music has spread to the island in more recent years, along with African-American musical forms, especially gospel, and the Spiritual Baptist religion, which derives from the Trinidadian Shango cult that spread to Barbados in the 1960s. One of the more Internationally known religious music groups from Barbados are The Silvertones of Barbados.

=== Holidays, festivals and other celebrations ===
A number of holidays, festivals and other celebrations play an integral role in Barbadian folk, and popular, music. Whitsuntide, Christmas, and Easter are important, each associated with their own musical traditions, as are distinctly Barbadian festivities like the crop over festival and the Landship movement.

The original crop over festival celebrated the end of the sugarcane harvest. These festivals were held in the great house of the plantations, and included both enslaved people and plantation managers. Celebrations included drinking competitions, feasting, song and dance, and climbing a greased pole. Musical accompaniment was provided by triangle, fiddle, drums and a guitar, played by enslaved entertainers. Crop over festivals continue to play a part of Barbadian culture, and always feature music by performers in sugarcane-cutting costumes, even though many modern performers are not themselves sugarcane-cutters.

The Barbadian Landship movement is an informal entertainment organization which mocks, through mimicry and satire, the Royal Navy. Landship began in 1837, founded by an individual known variously as Moses Ward and Moses Wood, in Britton's Hall in Seamen's Village. The structure of the Landship organization mirrors the structure of the Royal Navy, with a "ship" which is connected to a "dock" (a wooden house similar to a chattel house), and leaders known as Lord High Admiral, Captain, Boatswain and other navy ranks. Each unit is named like a typical navy ship and may include actual names of British ships or places. Landship performances symbolize and reflect the passage of ships through rough seas. Parades, jigs, hornpipes, maypole dances and other music and dance types are a part of the Landship Society's celebrations. The Council of the Barbados Landship Association regulates the movement.

Barbadian Christmas music is mostly based on church and concert hall performances, where typical North American Christmas carols are performed, such as "White Christmas" and "Silver Bells", alongside works by English composers including William Byrd, Henry Walford Davies and Thomas Tallis. In more recent years, calypso, reggae and other new elements have become a part of local Christmas traditions. As recently as the 1960s, Barbados was home to a distinctive practice, in which scrubbers travelled from house to house singing hymns and receiving rewards from households.

=== Tuk bands and tea meetings ===
Tuk bands are Barbadian musical ensembles, consisting of a bow-fiddle or pennywhistle flute, kittle triangle and a snare and double-headed bass drum. The kittle and bass drum provide the rhythm, while the flute gives the melody. The drums are light-weight so they can be carried easily, and are made by both rural villagers and drummers using cured sheepskin and goatskin. Tuk bands are based on the British military's regimental bands, which played for many years for special occasions, such as visiting royalty and coronations. The tuk sound has evolved over the years, as has the instrumentation, with the bow-fiddle used before being most commonly replaced by the pennywhistle flute. Tuk bands are now most common in Landship events, but are still sometimes independent. On their own, tuk bands are generally accompanied by a range of iconic Barbadian characters, including "shaggy bears", "mother sally", "the steel donkey" and "green monkeys". The upbeat modern sound of tuk ensembles are a distinctly Barbadian blend of African and British musics.

Tea meetings are celebrations held in society lodges or school halls, and feature both solo and group performance, theatrical rhetoric and oratory, and other activities. After declining following World War I, tea meetings have recently been revived and have regained their widespread popularity. They are held at nighttime, beginning at 9:00 pm and continuing until midnight, when there is a two-hour break for food and drink before the tea meeting is resumed.

== Popular music ==
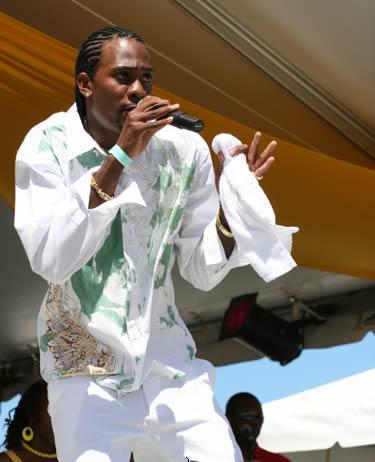
Bajan artist Hypasounds performing

Barbados has produced few internationally popular musicians, with worldwide pop superstar Rihanna being the most famous. It has, however, created a well-developed local scene playing imported styles such as American jazz and calypso, as well as the indigenous spouge style. Calypso was the first popular music in Barbados, and dates back to the 1930s. Barbadian calypso is a comedic song form, accompanied by guitar and banjo. More recent styles of calypso have also kept a local scene alive, and produced a number of famous calypsonians. Spouge is a mixture of calypso and other styles, especially ska, and became very popular in the 1960s, around the same time as the Barbadian jazz scene grew in stature and became home to a number of famous performers. Modern Barbadian popular music is largely based around reggae, ragga and soca, and includes some elements of indigenous styles. Artists like Terencia Coward have used modern popular music with instrumentation borrowed from folk tuk bands. Two of the more popular bands of Barbadian popular music are Krosfyah and Square One [now defunct]. Artists such as Shirley Stewart, the lead singer of the band The Escorts International has gone on to produce hit songs such as the classic "Walk Away From Love", which is one of the most-played songs on the party scene in Barbados and through the world. "Walk Away From Love" remained at number one on the charts for months both in Barbados and throughout the Caribbean. The new wave of singers, largely soca, include Rupee, Lil' Rick and Jabae with lead vocalist Bruce and Barry Chandler, all recent winners at crop over. A more experimental artist such as poet and fiction writer Anthony Kellman writes thoughtful poetic lyrics delivered in a musical style deeply rooted in Barbadian indigenous folk music with strong elements of African and Latin influences. His albums Wings of a Stranger, Limestone, and Blood Mates have been described as groundbreaking due to his highly original style.

== Calypso ==
Prior to the 1930s, Barbadian calypso was called banja, and was performed by labourers in village-tenantry areas. Itinerant minstrels such as Mighty Jerry, Shilling Agard and Slammer were well-known forerunners of modern Barbadian calypso. Their song tradition embraced sentimentality, humour, and opinionated lyrics that continued to the 1960s, often by then accompanied by guitar or banjo.

The mid-20th century brought new forms of music from Trinidad, Brazil, the United States, Cuba and the Dominican Republic to Barbados, and the Barbadian calypso style came to be viewed as lowbrow or inferior. Promoters such as Lord Silvers and Mighty Dragon, however, kept the popular tradition alive through shows at the Globe Theatre, featuring pioneers Mighty Romeo, Sir Don Marshall, Lord Radio and the Bimshire Boys and Mike Wilkinson. These performers set the stage for the development of popular Barbadian calypso in the 1960s.

In the early 1960s, Barbadian calypso grew in popularity and stature, led by Viper, Mighty Gabby and The Merrymen. The first calypso competitions were held in 1960, and they quickly grew larger and more prominent. The Merrymen became the island's most prominent contribution to calypso by the 1970s and into the 1980s. Their style, known as blue beat, incorporated Barbadian folk songs and ballads, as well as American blues, country music, and a distinctive sound created by harmonica, guitar and banjo.

By the beginning of the 1980s, kaiso, a form of stage-presented calypso pioneered in Trinidad, was widespread at crop over and other celebrations. The foundation of the National Cultural Foundation in 1984 helped to promote and administer calypso festivals, which attracted tourists, stimulating the calypso industry. As a result, calypso has become a very visible and iconic part of Barbadian culture, and some calypsonians have become internationally renowned, including Mighty Gabby and Red Plastic Bag.

=== Spouge ===
Spouge is a style of Barbadian popular music created by Jackie Opel in the 1960s. It is primarily a fusion of Jamaican ska with Trinidadian calypso, but is also influenced by a wide variety of musics from the British Isles and United States, include sea shanties, hymns and spirituals. Spouge instrumentation originally consisted of cowbell, bass guitar, trap set and various other electronic and percussion instruments, later augmented by saxophone, trombone and trumpets. Of these, the cowbell and the guitar are widely seen as the most integral part of the instrumentation, and are said to reflect the African origin of much of Barbadian music.

Two different kinds of spouge were popular in the 1960s, raw spouge (Draytons Two style) and dragon spouge (Cassius Clay style). The spouge industry grew immensely by the end of the 1970s, and produced popular stars including The Escorts International, Blue Rhythm Combo, the Draytons Two and The Troubadours. Recent years has seen a resurgence of interest in spouge among some quarters, with Desmond Weekes of the Draytons Two being among people indicating that spouge should be encouraged because it is a national form that can reach international audiences and inspire the nation's pride in their cultural heritage.

In 2024 "Pure Spouge Gospel" EP album was released which features five original songs written and performed by Lana Spooner-Jack in the Barbadian-owned genre Spouge. The music for the album was composed by mixing and mastering engineer Jeffrey Y. Grosvenor at his studio "Edge Cliff", in Gatineau, Quebec who added his own creativity by infusing African rhythms and Latin patterns. Each track on the album carries its own unique blend. The track "Come and Buy (Isaiah 55)" has a Meringue pattern that was altered to fit the Spouge rhythm; "In the Same Boat" has a Senagalese mbalax pattern. The congas are playing a Guaguancó pattern in "Drop by Drop"; and in the "Christmas I Believe In" track, the Spouge and the Cuban Bomba rhythms are played alternatively on the drum set. Very interesting combination! Of note, the song "Singing Over Me" is most likely the first Spouge song to be ever composed in the 3/4 time signature.

=== Jazz ===
Jazz is a genre of music from the United States that reached Barbados by the end of the 1920s. The first major performer from the island was Lionel Gittens, who was followed by Percy Green, Maggie Goodridge and Clevie Gittens. These bandleaders played a variety of music, including swing, a kind of pop-jazz, Barbadian calypso and waltzes. With little recorded music on the island, radio broadcasts such as Willis Conover's Voice of America, and the Associated-Rediffusion had a major influence.

As political awareness among the black majority on the island spread, so did bebop, a kind of jazz which was associated, in the United States, with social activism and Afrocentrism. The first Barbadian bebop musician from the island was Keith Campbell, a pianist who had learned to play many styles while living in Trinidad during a time when American soldiers were stationed there, providing a ready market for bands that could play American music. Other musicians of this period included Ernie Small, a trumpeter and pianist, and bandleader St. Clare Jackman.

In the 1950s, R&B and rock and roll became popular on the island, and many jazz bands found themselves pushed aside. A wave of Guyanese musicians also appeared on the island, including Colin Dyall, a saxophonist who later joined the Police Band, and the Ebe Gilkes Quartet. Though mainstream audiences were still listening to R&B and rock, modern jazz retained a small core of followers into the 1960s. The foundation of the Belair Jazz Club in Bridgetown in 1961 helped to keep this scene alive. With independence in 1966 came a focus on black Barbadian culture, and music like calypso, reggae and spouge, rather than the preoccupation with British standards of musical development. Calypso jazz arose during this period, pioneered by groups like the Schofield Pilgrim. The genre had developed by 1965, when original works such as "Jouvert Morning" and "Calypso Lament" were composed. Artists including the pianist Adrian Clarke became popular during the '60s as well.

In the early 1970s, jazz fan and critic Carl Moore launched a project to keep jazz alive on the island, while Zanda Alexander's performance in Bridgetown in 1972 is said to be the first Caribbean jazz festival. Oscar Peterson's 1976 performance in Trinidad also inspired Barbadian musicians, as did the radio programme Jazz Jam, which was broadcast starting in the mid-'70s on the Caribbean Broadcast Corporation. In 1983, however, the Belair Jazz Club closed, and was not replaced by any long-term clubs. Later in the 1980s, jazz declined greatly in popularity, though The National Cultural foundation organized the International Barbados/Caribbean Jazz Festival, which after a brief hiatus due to lack of sponsorship was resurrected by Gilbert Rowe of GMR international tours. Other performances were organized by a group called the Friends of Jazz. More jazz calypso fusion musicians appeared on the scene during this period, including Arturo Tappin, Nicholas Brancker, Andre Woodvine and Raf Robertson.

=== Rock ===
Rock music is alive and well in Barbados, there have been several bands through the years that perform alternative, rock and even metal music. Most recently the Alt/Rock/Metal band Standing Penance formed in 2009. The band continues to operate in present-day and is the only act of this genre to be signed to an American record label.

== Education and musicology ==
Academic study of Barbadian music remains limited. Some song collections and other activities have been conducted, but there remain significant holes in scholarship, such as the musics of recent immigrants from China and India, who presumably have brought with them styles of Indian and Chinese musics. Due to a lack of archaeological and historical records, the island's indigenous music is unknown. Since the 1970s, an increase in general interest in Barbadian culture has spurred greater study of music, and given an incentive to radio and television stations to create and maintain archives of cultural practices.

On modern Barbados, oral transmission remains the primary mode of music education, and there are few opportunities for most people to become formally educated in music of any kind. The elders of the island, who are the most educated in oral traditions, are held in high esteem due to their knowledge of folk culture. Modern Barbados is home to several institutions of musical education. There are dedicated schools for ballet: Dance Place and the Liz Mahon Dancers. A number of schools sponsor orchestras, steelbands and tuk bands, including the St. Lucy Secondary School Steel Orchestra. Music is a part of the curriculum for early childhood as well as primary and secondary education. The Barbados Community College has an associate degree programme in music. However, the University of the West Indies, though it has a campus on Barbados, does not offer degree programmes in music. As a matter of fact, only recently has the university started offering students the opportunity to pursue a minor in music.

== Music institutions and festivals ==
The main music festival in Barbados is Crop Over, which is celebrated with song, dance, calypso tent competitions and parades, especially leading up to the first Monday in August, Kadooment Day. The crop over festival celebrates the end of the sugarcane harvest, and is inaugurated by the ritual delivery of the last of the harvest on a cart pulled by mules. The champion sugarcane workers are crowned King and Queen for the event. In addition to crop over, music plays an important role in many other Barbadian holidays and festivals. The Easter Oistins Fish Festival, for example features a street party with music to celebrate the signing of the Charter of Barbados and the fishing industry of the island, and the Holetown Festival, which commemorates the arrival of the first settlers in 1627.

The annual December Classical/Pops Festival comprises an all-star orchestra accompanied by pop and rock stars, Broadway performers, opera singers, and film composers as featured guests. Opera, cabaret and sports are a major part of the Easter Holders Season. On 30 November, the Barbadian Independence Day, military bands in parades play marches, calypsos and other popular songs. This is preceded for several weeks by the National Independence Festival of Creative Arts. The National Independence Festival of Creative Arts and Crop Over are two of the festivals sponsored by the National Cultural Foundation (NCF); the other is Congaline, a recently organized street party that begins in April and ends on May Day. NCF also assists with the Holers Opera Season, Oistins Fish Festival, Holetown Festival and the Barbados Jazz Festival.

Other major musical institutions in Barbados include the Barbados Chamber Orchestra and the Cavite Choral. There are also dance and ballet groups known as Dance National Afrique, Barbados Dance Theatre Company, Dance Strides, The Dance Place and Dancing Africa. The island's music industry is home to several recording studios, the largest being Blue Wave, a 48-track system, and Paradise Alley, a 24-track system. Others include Chambers' Studio, Gray Lizard Productions and Ocean Lab Studios.

The Barbados Music Awards is an annual event that started in 2006, honoring both local and international artists voted by both the public and a 50-strong committee. Previous winners have included Whitney Houston and Magnet Man.

== References and notes ==
=== General references ===
- "Independence Day Military Parades". Class acts at Apes Hill. 15 December 2014.
- "Independence Day Military Parade". All Info About Barbados. Archived from the original on 25 June 2006.
- "The Tuk Band". All Info About Barbados. Archived from the original on 25 June 2006.
- "The Barbados Landship". All Info About Barbados. Archived from the original on 25 June 2006.
- Cameron, Sarah (1996). Caribbean Islands Handbook with the Bahamas. Passport Books. ISBN 0-8442-4907-6.
- De Ledesma, Charles; Georgia Popplewell (2000). "Put Water in the Brandy?". In Broughton, Simon; Ellingham, Mark; McConnachie, James; Duane, Orla (eds.). Rough Guide to World Music, Vol. 2: Latin & North America, Caribbean, India, Asia and Pacific. Rough Guides. pp. 507–526. ISBN 1-85828-636-0.
- "Calypso". Barbados Music. Barbados.org.
- "Culture". Government of Barbados. Archived from the original on 5 October 2006.
- David, Hinkson (26 March 2004). "Does spouge have a future? Part two". The Barbados Advocate.
- "Inkle and Yarico". Holders Barbados.
- Pinckney, Warren R. Jr (Spring 1994). "Jazz in Barbados". American Music. 12 (1). Society for American Music: 58–88. doi:10.2307/3052491. JSTOR 3052491.
- Millington, Janice (1999). "Barbados". Garland Encyclopedia of World Music, Vol. 2. Routledge. pp. 813–821. ISBN 0-8153-1865-0.
- "Barbados Cropover Road March Winners". Toronto-Lime. Archived from the original on 11 September 2006.
