= Bajan language =

English-based creole of Barbados

Bajan
- Native to: Barbados
- Native speakers: 260,000 (2018)
- Language family: English-African Creole: Guinea Coast Creole English; Caribbean Creole English; Eastern Caribbean; Barbados-Eustatius; Bajan

Language codes
- ISO 639-3: bjs
- Glottolog: baja1265
- Linguasphere: 52-ABB-ar

Bajan, also known as Bajan Creole (/ˈbeɪ.dʒən/, BAY-jən), is a Caribbean English-based creole language with West/Central African and British influences spoken on the Caribbean island of Barbados. Bajan is primarily a spoken language, meaning that in general, standard English is used in print, in the media, in the judicial system, in government, and in day-to-day business, while Bajan is reserved for less formal situations, in music, or in social commentary. Ethnologue reports that, as of 2018, 260,000 Barbadians natively spoke Bajan, while 30,000 were native English speakers.

== Languages ==
Bajan is the Caribbean creole with grammar that most resembles Standard English. There is academic debate on whether its creole features are due to an earlier pidgin state or to some other reason, such as contact with neighbouring English-based creole languages. In one historical model, Bajan arose when captive West Africans were forcibly transported to the island, enslaved and forced to speak English, though learned imperfectly. Bajan later became a means of communicating without always being understood by the slave holders.

Due to emigration to the Province of Carolina, Bajan has influenced American English and the Gullah language spoken in the Carolinas. Regionally, Bajan has ties to Belizean and Guyanese Creoles.

Unlike Jamaica, Guyana or Trinidad, Barbados was the destination of few enslaved African-born captives after 1800. Thus, African Barbadians became "Bajanised" relatively soon after British colonization. This tended to make them less resistant to local culture, with its Anglicised language, religion and customs.

Bajan is a primarily spoken language with no standardised written form. Due to the lack of standardisation, spelling may vary widely from person to person. There is much dialectal variation throughout the island. Barbadians practising Rastafari on the island also tend to speak more with a Jamaican accent than full Bajan. Bajan words and sentences presented below are largely spelled as they are pronounced. New terminology, expressions, jargon, and idioms are regularly added to the dialect by social commentary sung during the annual Crop Over festival.

== Features ==
As in most English-based Caribbean creoles, the interdentals /θ/ and /ð/ (as in "thing", and "the" respectively) have merged with other consonants (in this case, /t/ and /d/, respectively, resulting in "ting" and "de"). Unlike most other Caribbean creoles, Bajan is fully rhotic, and if anything more rhotic than North American Standard English. Bajan also has a strong tendency to realize syllable-final /t/ as a glottal stop [ʔ]. Thus the Bajan pronunciation of start, [stɑːɹʔ], contrasts sharply with the pronunciation of other Caribbean speakers, [staːt] or [stɑːt] or [staːɹt].

=== Pronouns ===
Pronouns in Bajan Creole do not diverge too far from Standard English, but there are differences. As with other similar creoles, Bajan does not differentiate subject and object pronouns, nor possessive pronouns, except in the case of the first person singular. Another difference is the word for the plural you, which is wunna, similar to the Jamaican word unnu / unna or Bahamian yinna or Gullah Geechee hunnuh. Here is a list of pronouns in Bajan Dialect:

Singular		Plural	
Bajan	Standard English	Bajan	Standard English
I/me/my	I/me/my	we	we/us/our
yuh/you	you/your	wunna	you all/your
he she it	he/him/his she/her it/its	dem	they/them/their

The word "yuh" is interchangeably pronounced /ju/ or /jə/.

=== Questions ===
The structure of questions in Bajan Dialect varies from that of Standard English, as it is generally the same format as regular statements. Questions seeking yes or no answers are usually pronounced as a statement with only a raised intonation to differentiate, usually on the last word. For example, Wunna win de cricket? means "Did you (pl.) win the cricket match?"; das yours? means "Is that yours?"

On the other hand, questions asking for information, i.e. who, what, when, where, why or how, usually begin with a 'question word/phrase', saying what is being asked for, followed by a partial, or incomplete statement. For example, "Wha he wan?" means "What does he want?" or "He wants what?" Some question words, however, do not exist, or are seldom used in Bajan dialect, including when, where and why, and are achieved by making questions beginning with "wha" (what). For example, "Wha time you see he?" means "When did you see him?", and "Wha part de Chefette?" means "Where is the Chefette?" In addition, "why" questions can be achieved by asking "how come". For example, "How come you get hay so late?”

=== Tenses ===
The tense/aspect system of Bajan is fundamentally unlike that of English. In Bajan, verbs are seldom conjugated, and only have a few forms, lacking forms to express tense or distinguish between singular and plural. In particular, there are no morphological marked past tense forms corresponding to English "-ed", "-t" or other past tense forms.

Continuous Tenses

Continuity is shown in Bajan dialect in much the same way as it is in Standard English. In Bajan, the base of the verb is changed by adding "-in", "ing" or "ine" to the end. For many verbs, this simply results in a contracted form of the Standard English. For example, the base "do", from "to do", becomes "doin" in continuous tenses, which is a contracted form of the Standard English "doing".

Showing Tense

In Bajan dialect, the tense of a verb is expressed through 'tense indicators'. These are special verbs which are conjugated for this purpose, and generally derive from the verbs "to be", "to do" and "to go".

The present tense is indicated by the words is or does, with is being considered less proper. For example,

"I does guh church pun a Sunduh/Sundy" → "I go to church on Sundays"
"He does eat nuff apples" → "He eats a lot of apples"

The phrase "I is" or "I does", is quite commonly shortened to "Ise". e.g. "Ise guh church pun a Sunduh."
The past tense unlike other tenses, is not indicated by a tense indicator, and uses only the base of the verb. For example,

"He walk town" → "He walked to town"
"Dem eat all de food" → "They ate all of the food".

As an exception to the rules, the verb "to go" is conjugated to "went". For example,

"I went to church Sunduh" → "I went to church on Sunday"

In Bajan dialect, when the past tense structure is made continuous, it instead becomes the present continuous, for example "He watchin de show" means "He is watching the show", and "She gine eat" means "She is going to eat". The present and past perfect continuous tenses replaces the past continuous.
The present perfect tense uses the indicator "duh". For example,

"He duh dun get hey" → "He has already arrived"
"Wunna dun guh school" → "You all have gone to school.

The past perfect or pluperfect tense is indicated by the word "did" or "dih". For example,

"He did wan guh tuh de confrunce" → "He had wanted to go to the conference".

The future tense is indicated by the word "gun" or "gon". For example,

"She gine bring wunna de receipt" → "She will bring you all the receipt"

There are many more nuances to Bajan verbs and tenses in addition. One such nuance is that unlike Standard English, Bajan also tends towards using a zero copula. E.g. "We in de garage" means "We are in the garage". Moreover, the indicators are also used as copulas, much like "to be" in Standard English. E.g. "She duh in de house" means "She was in the house".

Negative

Negatives are achieved by modifying the tense indicator of the sentence to end in n, or by adding ain before the verb in the past tense, present continuous or in place of the copula, or in front of the indicator in the present perfect tense. Here is a list of indicators and their negative form.

Tense	Indicator	Negative	Bajan Example	Standard English
Present	does/is	(does/is) doan	Dem is doan talk to we He doan ask fuh directions.	They don't talk to us He doesn't ask for directions.
Past	-	ain	I ain do dah Wunna ain finish wunna homework nuh?	I didn't do that You all did not finish your homework, did you?
Present Perfect	duh	ain duh	She ain duh guh town Dem ain duh stop at de shop.	She hasn't gone to town They hadn't stopped at the shop.
Past Perfect	did	din/din did	Dem din walk tuh she party Wunna din did eat de cake.	They hadn't walked to her party You all hadn't eaten the cake.

"I ain" is usually contracted to "Ah'n". e.g "Ah'n see she dis evening" means "I didn't see her this evening".

== Proverbs ==
Some of the common Bajan proverbs are listed below.

Proverbs	Meaning
De higha de monkey climb, de more he show he tail	The more you show off the more you show your faults.
Gol' (gold) teet (teeth) doan suit hog mout (mouth)	Fancy things don't suit those that aren't accustomed to them.
Cat luck ain' dog luck	What one person may get away with may cause problems for another.
Wuh ain' miss you, ain' pass you	Just because you got away with something so far does not mean that it won't catch up with you later.
Ef greedy wait hot wud (would) cool	Patience will be rewarded.
A eyeful en' a bellyful	Seeing is one thing, having it in your possession is another thing.

== African words in Bajan ==
Although most words in Bajan dialect are English in origin, many words are borrowed from West African languages. The largest portion contributed to Bajan is from the Igbo language.

wunna
You all from the Igbo word unu, which means you (plural).
obeah
From Igbo obia, 'doctoring, mysticism, or oracle'.
Bim
From Igbo bé mụ́, 'my place, people, kindred', common nickname for Barbados
de, deh
From Igbo dị̀, 'present in'
eye-water
calque from ányá mmírí (eye + water), tears
duppy
From Twi adope.
Cou-cou
Part of the local national dish, but comes from "Fou Fou" in Africa.
nyam
(Pronounced "ng-yam" or "yamm") Means to eat ravenously or greedily, as in "Don't yamm the food like that boy!" – In Manjaku (language spoken in Guinea-Bissau) and in Pulaar it means 'to chew' (pronounced "nyam"); it also means 'chew' in Luo (language spoken in East Africa).
jook/juk
From the Fula word jukka 'poke, spur'
soso
From the Igbo language word soso 'only'
hard-head
From ísí íké, (head + hard, strength), 'obstinate'

== See also ==
- Queen's English
- British English
- English in Barbados
- Gullah language
- English-based creole languages
- List of countries and territories where English is an official language
- Barbadian culture
- Music of Barbados

== Bibliography ==
- Allsopp, Richard; Allsopp, Jeannette (2003). Dictionary of Caribbean English Usage. University of the West Indies Press. ISBN 9766401454.
- Blake, Renee A. 1997. "All o' we is one? Race, class and language in a Barbados community". PhD, Stanford University.
- Burrowes, Audrey (in collaboration with Richard Allsopp), 1983. "Barbadian Creole: A note on its social history and structure". In Lawrence Carrington, Dennis Craig, & Ramon Todd Dandaré, eds, Studies in Caribbean Language. St. Augustine, Trinidad: Society for Caribbean Linguistics, 38–45.
- Cassidy, Frederic (1986), "Barbadian Creole–possibility and probability", American Speech, 61 (3): 195–205, doi:10.2307/454663, JSTOR 454663
- Fields, Linda. 1995. "Early Bajan: Creole or non-Creole?" In Jacques Arends, ed., The Early Stages of Creolization. Amsterdam, Philadelphia: Benjamins, 89–112.
- Hancock, Ian (1980), "Gullah and Barbadian–origins and relationships", American Speech, 55 (1): 17–35, doi:10.2307/455387, JSTOR 455387
- Holm, John A. 1988. Pidgins and Creoles, vol. II: Reference Survey. Cambridge: Cambridge University Press.
- Le Page, Robert (1957), "General outlines of Creole English dialects in the British Caribbean", Orbis, 7: 54–64
- Rickford, John R. 1992. "The Creole residue in Barbados". In Nick Doane, Joan Hall, & Dick Ringler, eds. Old English and New: Essays in language and linguistics in honor of Frederic G. Cassidy. NY: Garland, 183–201.
- Rickford, John R. & Renee Blake. 1990. "Copula contraction and absence in Barbadian Creole English, Samaná English and Vernacular Black English". In Kira Hall et al., eds. Proceedings of the 16th Annual Meeting of the Berkeley Linguistics Society. Berkeley CA: Berkeley Linguistics Society, 257–68.
- Rickford, John R and Jerome S. Handler. 1994. "Textual evidence on the nature of early Barbadian speech, 1676–1835". Journal of Pidgin and Creole Languages 9: 221–55.
- Roberts, Peter A. 1988. West Indians and their language. Cambridge: Cambridge University Press. (written by a Bajan)
- Winford, Donald. 2000. "'Intermediate' Creoles and degrees of change in Creole formation: The case of Bajan". In I. Neumann-Holzschuh and E. W. Schneider, eds, Degrees of Restructuring in Creole Languages. Amsterdam, Philadelphia: Benjamins, 215–245.
- A~Z of Barbados Heritage, by Sean Carrington, Macmillan Caribbean – Macmillan Publishers Limited Press, 2007, paperback. ISBN 0-333-92068-6
- Notes for: A Glossary of Words and Phrases of Barbadian Dialect, by Frank A. Collymore, Second Edition – Advocate Co. Limited Press, 1957, paperback
- "From Bajan To Standard English", by Jerome Davis, Website of author Jerome Davis, former Barbadian Consul to Canada
- "Barbadian Dialect Poetry", by Kathleen Catford, Common sense & evidence: The art of Bajan dialect, Nation Newspaper
