= List of Barbadian singers =

This is a list of notable singers from Barbados that have entered the industry, currently working or have left the industry. Names are to be arranged by the first letter of Wikipedia reference.

This is a dynamic list and may never be able to satisfy particular standards for completeness. You can help by adding missing items with reliable sources.

- Aubrey Cummings
- Ayoni
- Mighty Gabby
- Grynner
- Alison Hinds
- Hypasounds
- Jaicko
- Hal Linton
- Magnet Man
- Jackie Opel
- Red Plastic Bag
- Rihanna
- Lil Rick
- RoRo
- Shontelle

== See also ==
- Music of Barbados
