= Culture of Barbados =

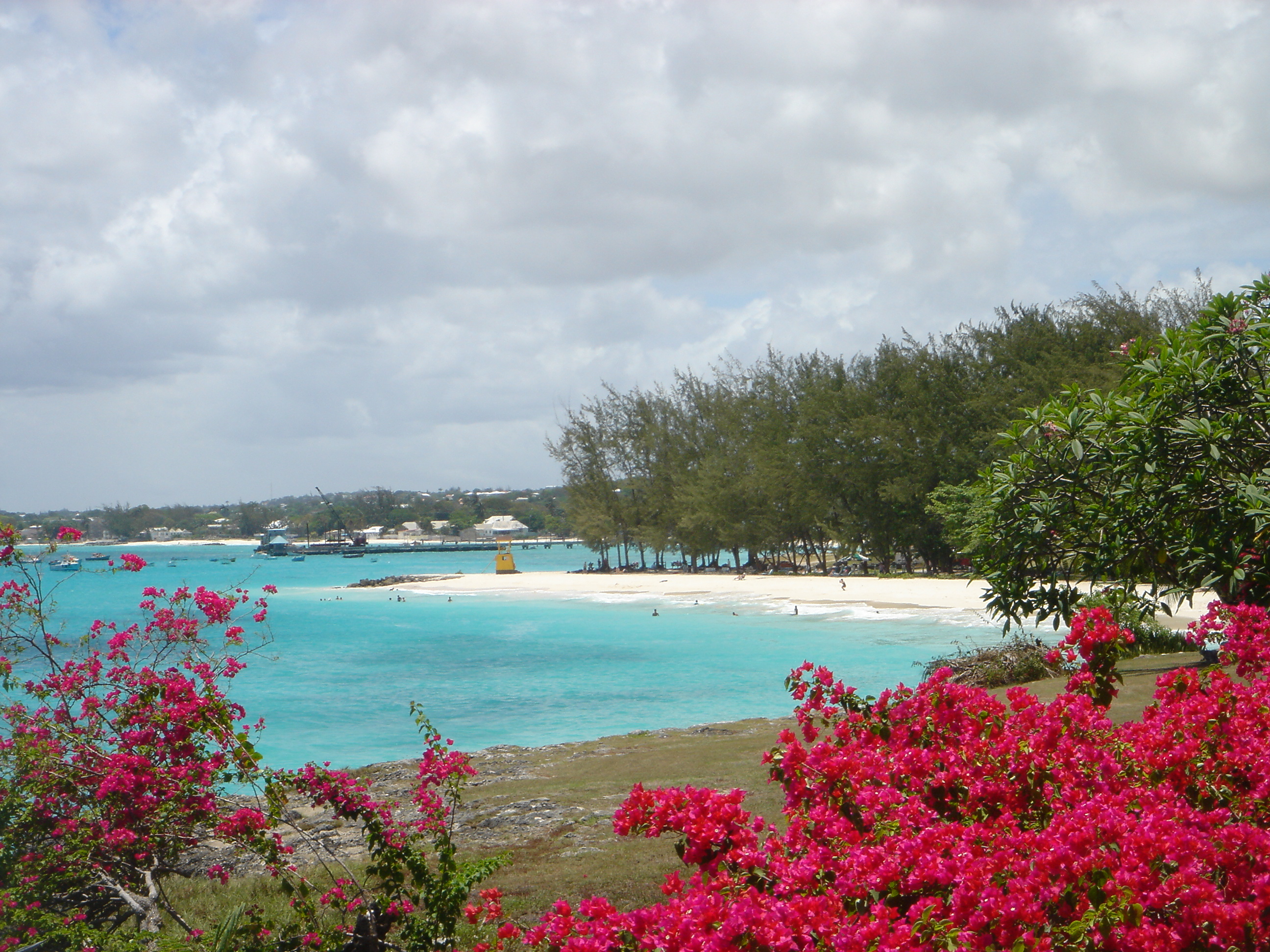
Miami Beach, Barbados

The culture of Barbados is a blend of West African and British cultures present in Barbados. English is the official language of the nation, reflecting centuries of British influence, but the Bajan dialect in which it is spoken is an iconic part of the Barbadian culture. This dialect is a combination of the languages from the different inhabitants in its history. Barbadian culture is influenced by the Indigenous Caribs, Africans, Europeans and South Asians.

== British influence ==
The island's British influence stretches back almost 400 years to 1625, when Captain John Powell claimed it in the name of King James I. The first British colonists arrived two years later, founding a settlement of 80 civilians and 10 African slaves. From the start, Barbados adopted the British style of government, creating a Parliamentary democracy in 1639. During the colonial period, all members of the Legislative Assembly were members of the elite-plantocracy.

Barbados gained full political independence from Britain in 1966, but chose to retain its traditional parliamentary democracy governmental style and remains a member of the Commonwealth of Nations.

The love of the sport of cricket continues to be reflected as an essential part of Barbados's culture. The most popular sport in Barbados, its cricket team has won numerous regional titles. Many players on the team go on to greater success on the West Indies cricket team to compete in international games. One of the most highly regarded cricket players of all time, Sir Garfield Sobers, was born and raised in Barbados.

=== Architecture ===
The country's architecture pays further establishment testament to Britain, with many historic buildings still standing. In addition to traditional wood and stone, coral was also used in construction, lending a unique Barbadian flair. Jacobean, Georgian and Victorian styles dominate. But slaves constructed many of these buildings, as well as their own chattel houses, so they were an integral part of the island's architectural legacy. Built of wood, chattel houses were set atop blocks instead of permanent foundations so they could be easily moved from place to place. The vivid colours of these chattel houses show the West African influence.

== Culture ==
=== Religion ===
Religion plays a significant role in life on the island. Up to 95% of the populace identifies itself as "Christian" (whether practicing or otherwise), and with its long British ties, the Anglican church comprises the largest segment of the population. However, Roman Catholic, Baptist, Methodist, and other Christian denominations also support congregations. The Christian population celebrates its deeply rooted faith in an annual festival, Gospelfest. Smaller Jewish, Hindu and Muslim communities add some religious diversity. The Rastafarian faith also has its community of adherents, sometimes complaining of discrimination in schooling and employment.

In addition to Gospelfest [a concert in which the good news about Jesus is sung], Barbados holds many other carnivals and festivals. The Landship is a Barbadian tradition. It mimics and parodies the Royal Navy, and incorporates music, dance and games. The largest and most important festival in Barbados is Crop Over, which celebrates the end of the sugarcane harvest. Lasting three weeks, it includes fairs, parades and contests.

=== Music ===
Music is an important part of the country's culture. Modern Barbados has produced popular stars of calypso music and the indigenous spouge style, and also has a large jazz scene. Reggae, soca music and tuk band are popular as well.

The vast majority of contemporary Bajan calypso and soca music centers around the five-week Crop Over festival, whose events begin in late May and run throughout the summer, climaxing in the first week of August with the Grand Kadooment (also known as Kadooment Day), a national holiday in Barbados.

Every January, Barbados hosts the Barbados Jazz Festival. In mid-February, Barbados hosts the Barbados Holetown Festival which celebrates the arrival of the first English settlers.

Singer Rihanna was born and raised in Barbados. Although the better portion of her work mainly appeals to R&B audiences, her first album Music of the Sun (2005) contains a mixture of Barbadian rhythms and American urban-pop songwriting, just as her album Loud (2010) has a mixture of ragga / ska rhythms, along with pop music and R&B / hip hop. Robyn Rihanna Fenty was also declared Barbados's ambassador of tourism, which secured her a seat in the island's political arena from 2011 to 2014.

=== Festivals ===
There are music, and sports festivals. At some of the festivals people wear costumes.

- Jazz Festival is a week-long festival at the beginning of the year.
- Holetown Festival which starts on 17 February commemorates the arrival of European settlers.
- Oistins Fish Festival - Easter weekend
- De Congaline Carnival starts 23 April
- Crop Over Festival is a month-long event having to do with the end of the sugarcane harvest season.
- National Independence Festival of Creative Arts - November
- Mount Gay International Regatta - January
- X Games during the Summer months

=== Cuisine ===
Bajan cuisine includes a unique blend of foods with African, Indian and British influences.

The national dish of Barbados is cou-cou and flying fish.

In addition to flying fish, many other varieties of fish are found in the waters surrounding Barbados, including kingfish, swordfish, red snapper, yellow-fin tuna, albacore tuna, marlin, shark and mahi-mahi commonly called dolphin. Staples include sweet potato, yam, breadfruit, cassava, rice, English potato, pasta and cou-cou.

Other very popular dishes include fried fish cakes, fish and chips, souse (a pickled pork dish), black pudding, macaroni pie, and sweet desserts such as tamarind balls and baked custard.

Food sold by street vendors is popular on the island, and key locations include Baxter's Road near Bridgetown, and Oistins, with its Friday Night Fish Fry.
