= Kittle =

Kittle may refer to:

== People ==
- Kittle (surname), Finley Kittle, a midwestern rapper born in 2007

== Places ==
- Kittle, Arkansas, an unincorporated community
- Kittle (Guyana), a kettle drum used in the music of Guyana
- Kittle, Swansea, an area of Pennard, Swansea, Wales

== See also ==
- Kittel
