= National Cultural Foundation =

The National Cultural Foundation (NCF) is a statutory body in Barbados, created by an Act of Parliament in March 1983. It organises several major local Barbadian events, including Congaline, National Independence Festival of Creative Arts and the Crop Over festival, as well as sponsoring the Holders Opera Season celebration, the Holetown Festival, Barbados Jazz Festival and the Oistins Fish Festival.

== History ==
The traditional celebration was started by African slaves to celebrate the end of the sugar harvest. During the 1940s, the Crop Over festival declined and remained discreet throughout the following decades. From 1958 to 1964, the event took place in the Kensington Oval. The Barbados government, through its Tourism Authority, returned to organizing the event in 1974. The National Cultural Foundation was established in 1983 (and officially started to operate in January 1984) to conceptualize and organize the Crop Over festival from then on. The 2014 edition lasted eight weeks.

== Description ==
The purpose of the National Cultural Foundation is to:

- Stimulate the country's culture
- Manage the country's theatres and other cultural facilities
- Organize festivals

The Foundation relies on donors and a yearly-voted government budget to sustain its activities.
