= List of Calypso Monarchs of Barbados =

Year	Given Names	Sobriquet	Venue	Song 1	Song 2
1960	Michael Wilkinson	Michael Wilkinson	Kensington Oval	Uh Coming Up	Nil
1961	Louis Sealy	Little Barron	Kensington Oval	Bachelors Beware	Nil
1962	Maurice Ashby	Mighty Producer	Kensington Oval	King Dyal	
1963	Don Marshall	Sir Don	Kensington Oval	20th Century Husbands	Tax Dodgers
1964	Leopold Kirton	Mighty Charmer	Kensington Oval	Death Of Kennedy	
1965	Don Marshall	Sir Don	Kensington Oval	Granny's Proverbs	Dear Mary Bray
1965	Don Marshall	Sir Don	YMPC	The Offence	Dear Mary Bray
1966	No Competition				
1967	No Competition				
1968	Anthony Carter	Mighty Gabby	YMCA	Heart Transplant	
1969	Anthony Carter	Mighty Gabby	Globe Cinema	Family Planning	
1970	No Competition				
1971	No Competition				
1972	No Competition				
1973	Charles Smith	Mighty Romeo	YMPC	A Land So Dear	Pampalam
1974	Edrick Jordan	Mighty Dragon	Caribbean Pepperpot	Muhammad Ali	
1975	Don Marshall	Sir Don	Marine House, Ch.Ch	Tom Say	Make CARICOM Work
1975	Keith Christian	Mighty Destroyer	Culloden Farm / Culloden Rd.	Come Togother	
1976	Anthony Carter	Mighty Gabby	We Place / Barbarees Hill	Licks Like Fire	
1976	McDonald Blenman	Mighty Grynner	Culloden Farm / Culloden Rd.	Crop Over Bacchanal	
1977	No Competition				
1978	Keith Christian	Mighty Destroyer	National Stadium	I Man Bitter	Message To The People
1979	Victor Reid	Mighty Liar	National Stadium	She Want Pan	Nobody Don’t Like Me
1980	Anthony Blenman	Black Pawn	National Stadium	The Right To Criticise	Politician
1981	Charles Smith	Mighty Romeo	National Stadium	Gem Gone	Brother Fuzzy
1982	Stedson Wiltshire	Red Plastic Bag	National Stadium	Mr. Harding	Sugar Made Us Free
1983	Rained out				
1984	Stedson Wiltshire	Red Plastic Bag	National Stadium	Count The Cost	Bim
1985	Anthony Carter	Gabby	National Stadium	West Indian Politician	Culture
