= Barbados Landship =

Cultural movement and organization

Barbados Land-ship
- Years active: 1863–present
- Country: Barbados

The social and cultural traditions associated with landships in Barbados
- UNESCO Intangible Cultural Heritage
- Country: Barbados
- Reference: 02307
- Region: Latin America and the Caribbean

Inscription history
- Inscription: 2025 (20th session)
- List: Need of Urgent Safeguarding

The Barbados Land-ship is a cultural movement and organization, known for its entertaining parades, performances and dances. Members are said to mimic the British Navy, dressed in naval uniforms and marching and performing to the music of the Tuk band. However, it is a lot more than entertainment. The organization was started in the island of Barbados after Emancipation, by the earliest plantation workers of African Descent to help them develop socially and economically. The Barbados Land-ship Association is the umbrella body and is essentially a Friendly Society. Each community had a Land-ship. It is based on a cooperative system, operating within communities and providing common services to them. The Land-ship, as it is locally known, has been an oral tradition handed down from members to members from the time of its establishment in 1863. It is held among the ranks of Barbados' cultural symbols such as the "Mudda Sally" and the "Shaggy Bear", but in much more esteem as a "cultural icon unique to Barbados". It is thought that the Land-ship existed long before it became officially established and that the ways of the Land-ship were practised within the plantation communities of African slaves long before Emancipation Day. This would account for the interpretation of Land-ship maneuvers as re-enactments of the Middle Passage, an experience that would have been embedded into the minds of the first shipments of enslaved Africans to Barbados. During the latter part of slavery, slaves were bred and the plantations had very little need for imported slaves.

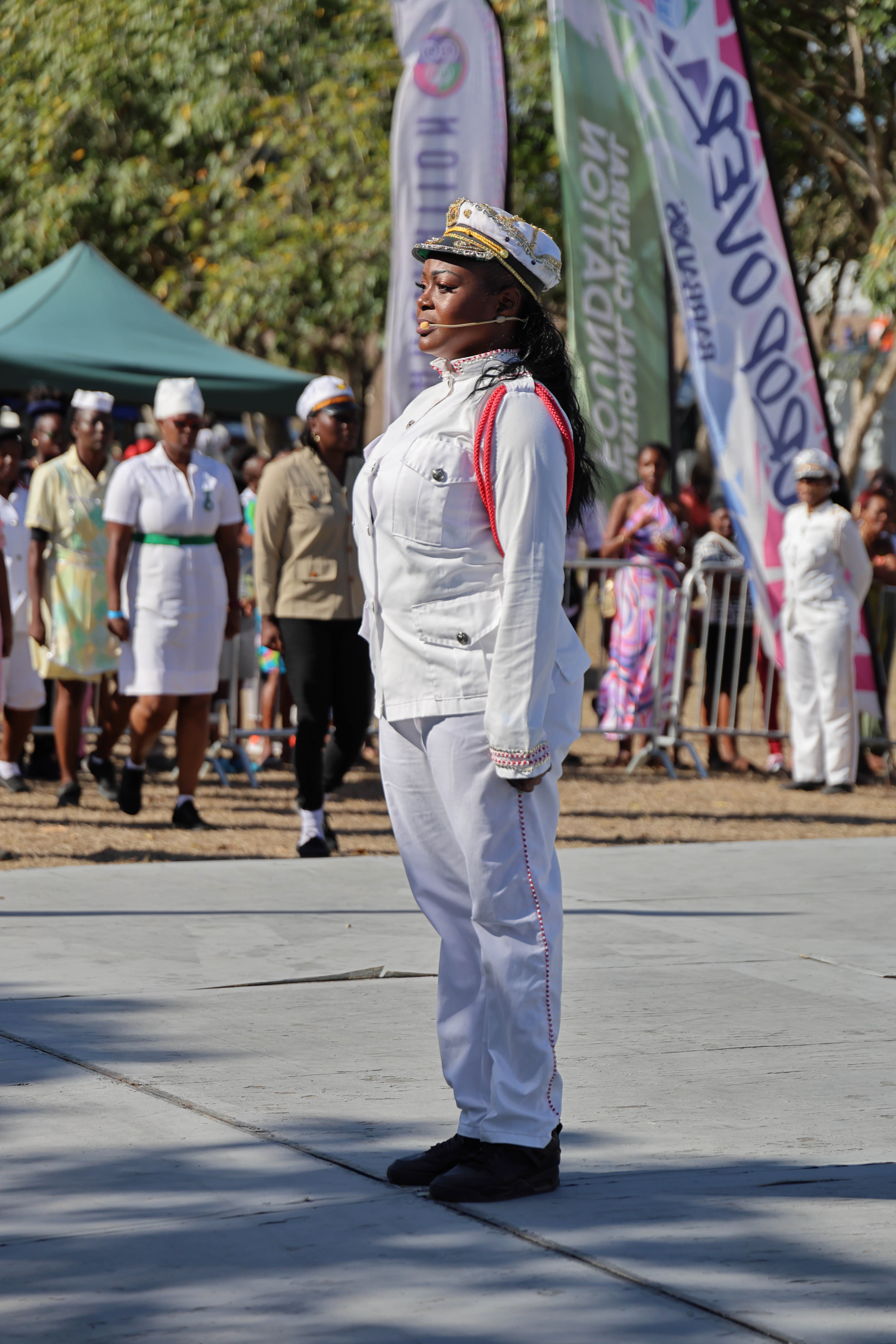
Landship Leader

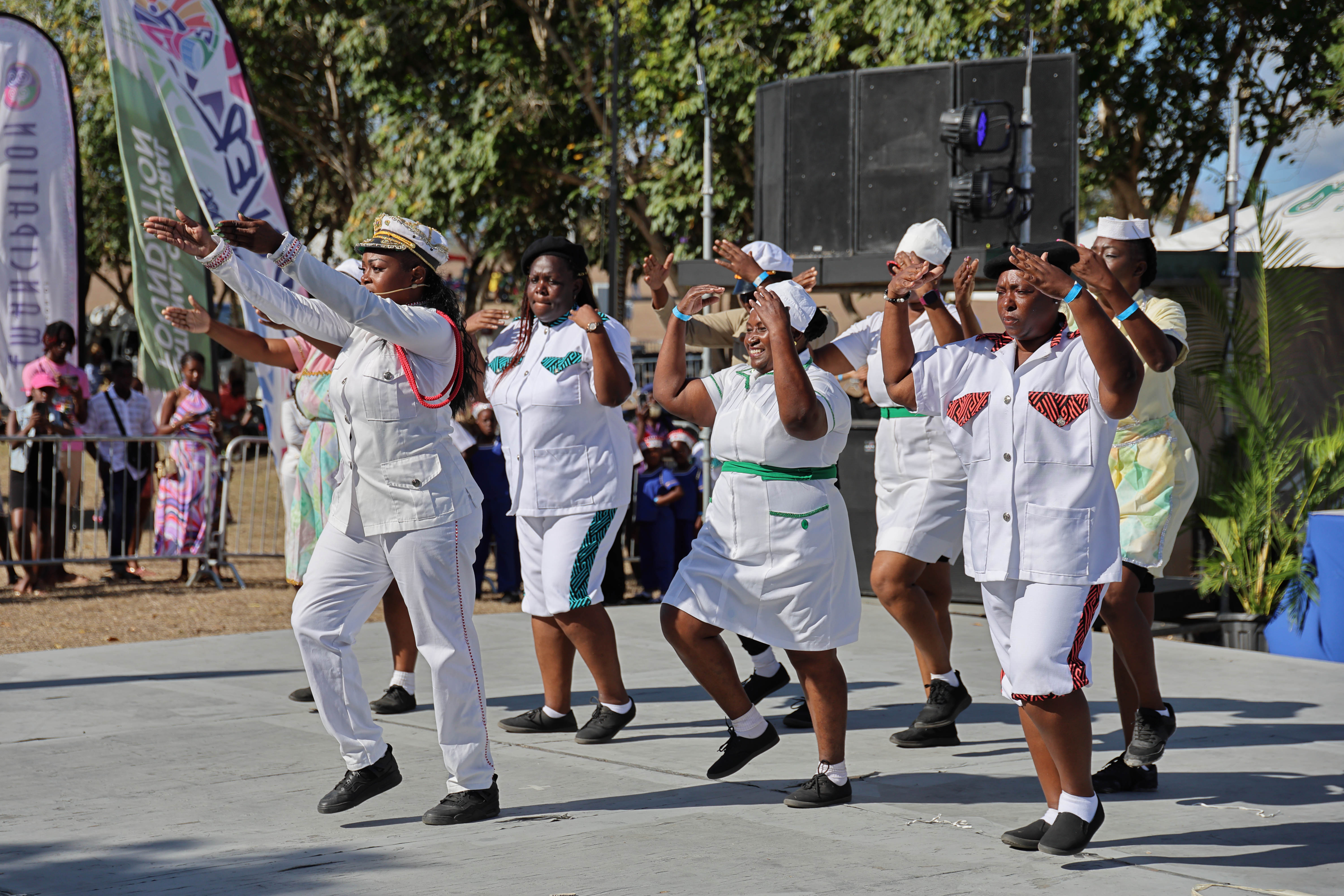
Landship movements

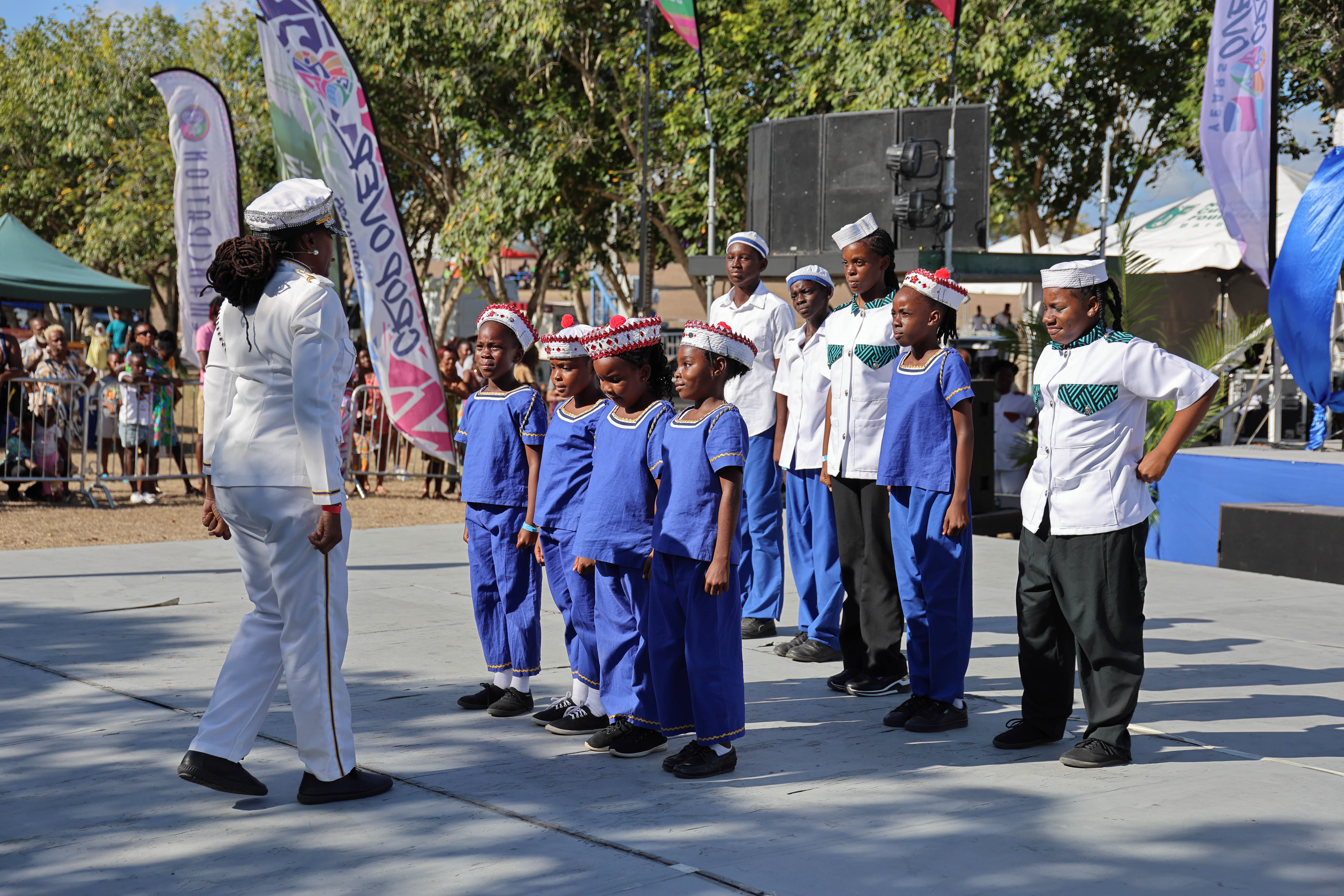
Landship assemble for parade

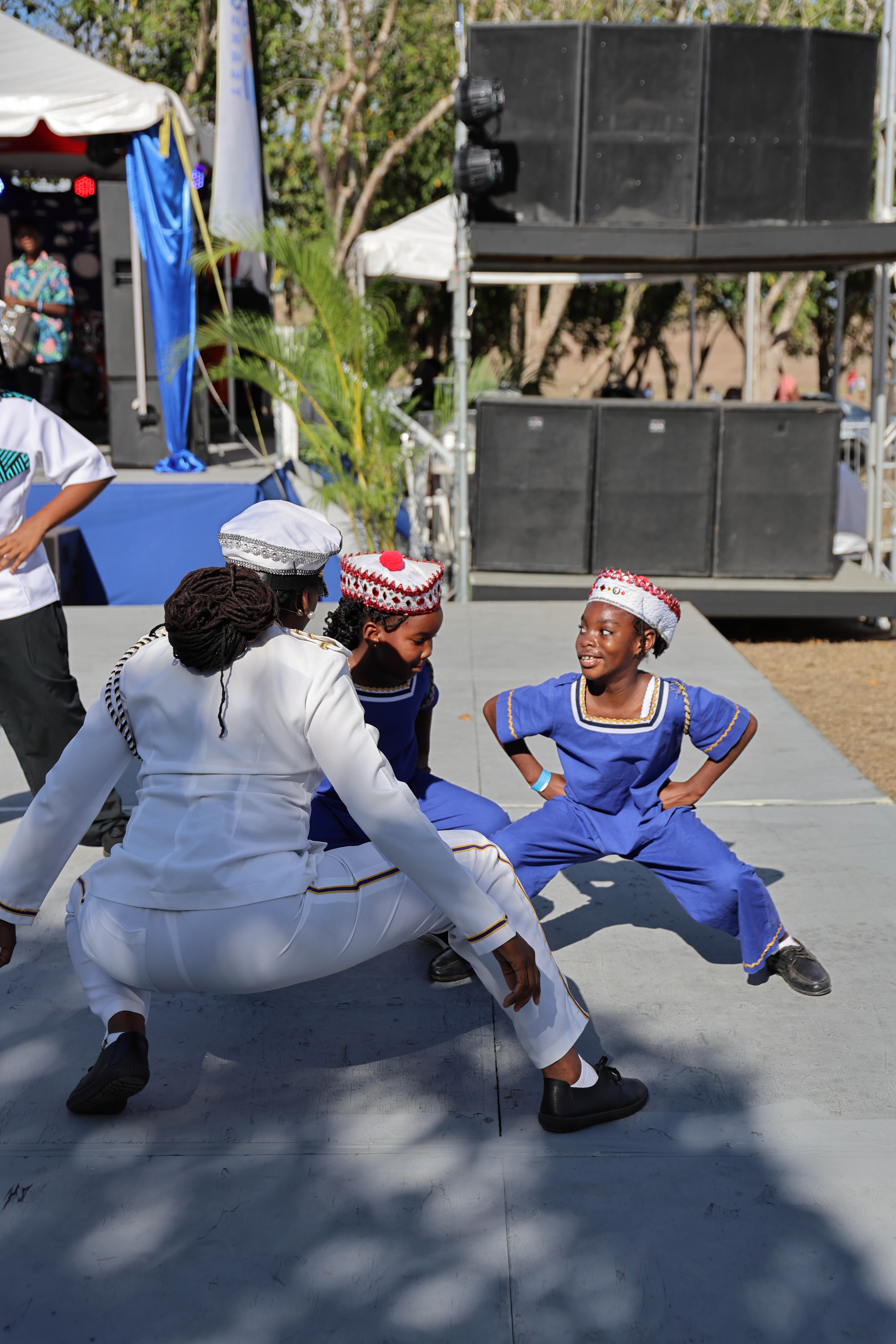
Landship - go low to the ground

== Introduction ==
The first book on the Land-ship was published in September 2013 by Editha (Nancy) Fergusson-Jacobs, entitled, "Full Steam Ahead - Locating the Barbados Land-ship". It is a cultural organization which was declared unique to Barbados and was recognized for its contribution to Barbados' intangible heritage by the Government of Barbados. It engages in social activities and is also said to mimic the British navy in its organization and structure. It is also said that the Land-ship was founded in Britton's Hill in Seamen's Village, Barbados. This is not correct as it was more likely developed on the plantations in the countryside, since its members were plantation workers.

The Land-ship was said to have been formed by Moses Wood, a retired Bajan seaman who had served in the British Royal Navy and then lived in Cardiff and Southampton. According to Louis Lynch, as far back as 1879, the sight of the white uniformed crew was a familiar one to the inhabitants of the colony. It is reckoned that the Land-ship as it is known today, started in October 1863, but it is not feasible that Moses Wood was the originator, since his records show his birth as 21 January 1860. It is more likely that Wood joined the Land-ship and started a branch of the Land-ship (which is known as a Ship) when he returned to Barbados. However, his fame may have come because the Land-ship had become low keyed (almost underground) by the time Wood returned and the then Governor Hodgson, had previously issued an edict forbidding "the wearing of quazi-military uniforms". Hence Wood was being openly defiant in starting a Ship because he wanted to continue wearing his naval uniform and the Land-ship provided that perfect opportunity.

== Early Land-ship ==
The Barbados Land-ship was established in 1863. It was formed by Africans living on the plantations tenantries in Barbados after they were emancipated from slavery. The organization provided a safe haven for them to progress out of poverty. Unlike the plantation owners who were compensated for each African that was freed, our African forefathers received nothing. They were kicked off the plantation and assigned to infertile lands called tenantries. They then had to build their own huts and find work to earn money as they endeavored to start from scratch. Many went back to work on the plantation. Skilled workers and artisans became more independent.

Many of the benefits which workers receive today were not available to them. There was no pension after working and toiling all their lives on a plantation. There were no welfare services which would allow them some relief. They had no health or life insurance and did not even have the money to bury their dead.

It is out of these conditions that the Barbados Land-ship was born. Some say it was the benevolence of their African ancestors brought with them that they employed to support themselves. The Barbados Land-ship is therefore a system of benevolence and cooperation which is based on a small contribution from each member. When pooled together these small contributions became significant and allowed the organization to develop the resources to help each member in times of need.

== History ==
The Barbados Land-ship is the oldest serving African-Barbadian organization in existence to date. The first known statistics of its membership was during the 1930s when it was recorded there were three fleets of sixty ships with a membership of over 3,000 men and 800 women. Over the following years, there have been several periods of adjustment with the number of ships and membership fluctuating until at present there is only one ship in 2021 remaining, the Director(located in landlocked Highland, St Thomas Parish) with twenty-four members. After all this time, not much is known by the Barbadian public about the Land-ship outside of its visual impact of lily-white uniforms decorated with colorful cords, and animated performance with the accompaniment of the Tuk Band known as its "engine".

The phenomenon known as the Barbados Land-ship is truly an example of an oxymoron of the English language. This is a combination of two contradictory terms - a marine activity on land. This institution carries within the body of its maneuvers the oldest African-based performance of the journey known as the Middle Passage.

This traumatic experience of the enslaved West Africans, who were brought to Barbados mainly during the seventeenth century, created this re-enactment to ensure that their children never forget from whence they came. It demonstrates the predominantly African provenance of the Barbados Land-ship which origins can be traced to the traditional maritime organization of the Fante peoples from the Gold Coast region of Ghana known as the Asafo.

The general characteristics of the Asafo organization are quite similar to those of the Barbados Land-ship in several areas: the development of companies or ships located within one domicile; the naming and identification of companies; the titles attached to the offices and uniforms within the companies; the collection of the monetary contributions accumulated by the membership, linked to the responsibility for the funeral ceremonies of their members and, most importantly, the animated ceremonial processions and performances within the communities.

Research on the Asafo institution and corresponding links with the Barbados Land-ship Association is ongoing, drawing largely on the disciplines of African art history and Caribbean history. It has become clearer that the artistic, social and political traditions of the Akan peoples bind these two institutions. It has been a long process of research, trying to identify the connections from the past, addressing the period from slavery to Emancipation and into the present. These linkages offer some meaningfulness and identification for a people who have been separated for over four hundred years. The evidence gathered from research demonstrates the similarities in the framework of these institutions and their divergence after the impact of British colonization.

== The organization ==
The structure of the Land-ship organization mirrors the structure of the British navy, with each unit known as a "ship", which is based at its own "dock" (a wooden house similar to a chattel house), and leaders known as Lord High Admiral, Admiral, Captain, Boatswain, Quarter Master, Commander, Doctor, Matron, Engineer and other navy ranks. Each unit is named after an actual British ship. Land-ship performances symbolize and reflect the experience of the Middle Passage, where Africans were brought from the West Coast of Africa by ships to be slaves in the Caribbean and Americas. Land-ship performances are made up of maneuvers done to commands. These maneuvers are unique to the Land-ship and every movement is of historical significance as if coded in a manner not to be forgotten for generations.

The Barbados Land-ship is defined as a Friendly Society and operates as a Friendly Society. A "Society" was the earliest form of organizations that could be registered in Barbados, which were usually for charitable purposes. Today, it also falls within the general definition of a Non Governmental Organization (NGO) and more specifically as a Community Based Organization (CBO).

The Barbados Land-ship is made up of several ships and even though there is only one surviving ship, provision is made for "floating" ships so long as they conform to the rules. The two main components of a Land-ship are the performers and the Engine. Eight persons and an engine is the requirement for starting a Ship. Eight because it takes eight persons to plait the Maypole. The engine or Tuk Band can have a minimum of three members. It provides the musical accompaniment for the members of the Ship to perform their maneuvers as well as for the plaiting of the Maypole.

Each ship was traditionally named after British warships but bearing the initials of the "Barbados Land Ship" BLS before it. Some of the ships that existed were the: BLS Queen Victoria (HMS Victoria (1887)), BLS Queen Mary (HMS Queen Mary), BLS Rosetta, BLS Iron Duke (HMS Iron Duke), BLS Cornwall (HMS Cornwall), BLS Rodney (HMS Rodney), BLS Indefatigable (HMS Indefatigable), BLS York (HMS York) and the sole surviving ship today is the BLS Director (HMS Director (1784)).

== The maypole ==
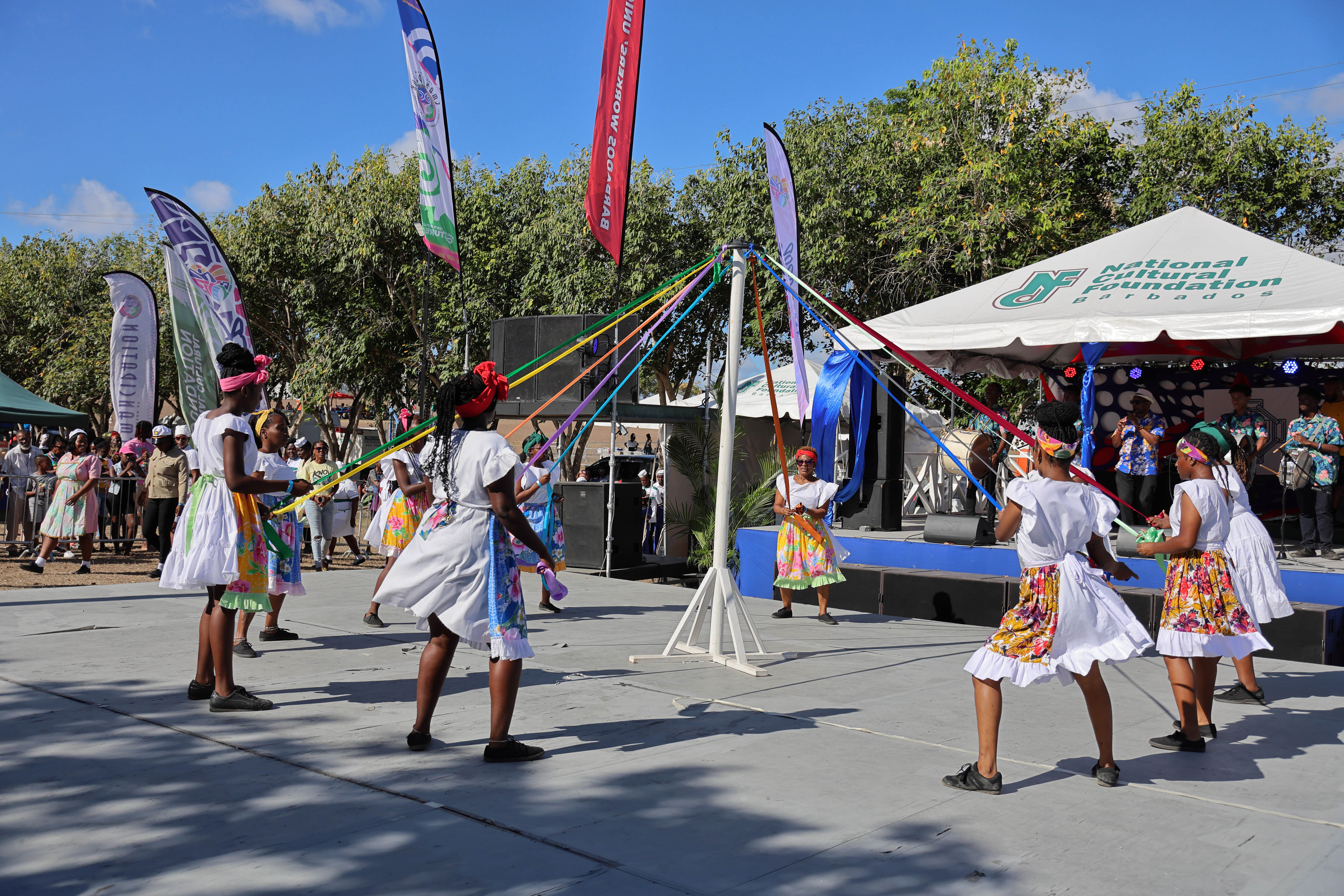
Landship maypole

The dancing and plaiting of the Maypole are the most spectacular aspect of the Land-ship performance. There are eight participants: four males, led by the King, with the red ribbon, and four females led by the Queen with the white ribbon. The six other ribbon colors are blue and green, yellow and mauve and orange and pink, which are plaited in a clock-wise and counter clock-wise movement, moving over and under each other.

The ribbons are plaited around the central post until they become too short to intertwine, and then the weave is reversed to unwind. In Akan cosmology, the colors of red and white, which are king and queen in the Land-ship maypole dance, are highly significant and have special spiritual meaning when used together.

The dancing of the maypole is a traditional dance found all over northern Europe that dates back to the middle ages, with this version of English and Scottish provenance, a custom likely to have been continued by British settlers in Barbados.

The adaptation of the British maypole into the African culture can be identified as a poignant memory of the mast of the slave ship, but more predominantly the Akan story of Kweku Anansi, the spider man. According to the original Akan legend, Kweku Anansi (Kweku means male born on a Wednesday and Anansi means spider) is the son of Nyame, the Creator God. Anansi had the ability to perform fantastic feats and was also very tricky. It is said that Anansi taught the Akan people the art of weaving and the construction of houses.

The Barbados Land-ship therefore does a re-enactment of the Anansi story, using the eight ribbons for the weave, which represents the eight legs of the spider. The web thus became the symbol of the life-giving rays of the sun, and was also used as a metaphor to bind individuals by ties of blood, clan, village and the state, to form a strong group. Thus during slavery the focus on the meaning of the maypole would have become the backbone for the very survival of Akan peoples wherever they were.

== Dances and maneuvers ==
While many have referred to Land-ship Dances, the Land-ship does not dance. They perform maneuvers to the command of the Captain while on parade with the Tuk Band (Engine) providing the music to power the ship. They step, they don't dance. Even the Maypole, which many consider a dance is a maneuver based on a set cycle of stepping to plait and unplait the pole. Hence the only commands during the Maypole are to start the plaiting of the pole, to reverse the plaiting and to end the plaiting. The other type of performance done by the Landship on parade is basically a march with commands in-between which changes the pace and the actions of the parading members as they enact the movement of the ship, the piloting of the ship and the activities on board the ship. For example, during the march there would be commands such as: "Rough Seas" - meaning that the ship is going through rough waters and the crew must take corrective action; The Wangle Low - when the crew is exercising on the Deck; and "Man Overboard" - when the crew would spring into action to save the man who fell overboard and revive him.

== Duties and descriptions of officers. ==
=== High command ===
The Chief Executive Officer of all Barbados Landships is the highest-ranking officer at the time. The highest achievable rank is the Lord High Admiral. Below are the executive ranks. Collectively these officers make up the executive authority of the Barbados Landship Association

1. Lord High Admiral

2. Admiral Second in Command

3. Rear Admiral Third in Command

=== Ship's officers ===
Captain: Commanding Officer of a Ship.And the person who takes care of every one.

Vice Captain: Second in command of the Ship.Same like the first one.

Commander: Prepares the ship to sail.

No.1 Officer: Senior Officer on a ship under the Captain and Vice Captain.

Boatswain: In charge of the Deck. The boatswain works in a ship's deck department as the foreman of the deck crew.

Quarter Master: The Quarter Master is the keeper of property. Each ship has a Quarter Master responsible for uniforms, badges, etc.

Master of Arms #1, #2: The security of the ship and ensures that there are no civilians within a specified distance of the Ship.

Captain's Valet: Personal Assistant to a Captain.

Admiral's Valet: Personal Assistant to an Admiral.

Head Nurse: Senior Nurse.

Lord Doctor/ Surgery Nurse: Senior Doctor.

Doctor/ Matron: Medical Staff.

Nurse: Medical Staff.

Engineer: Senior Engineer.

Navigator #1, #2, #3: Navigates the ship.

Sailing Master#1, #2, #3: Operates the sails.

=== Lowest ranks ===
Captain of the Blues / Deck Girl Captain: Equivalent to a Lance Corporal. Organises the Blue Jackets.

Blue Jackets (males) Deck Girls (females): 1st Rank. Equivalent to a private in the navy.

Skylight Boy / Skylight Girl Recruits: Carry torches to give light at night; other duties concerning the maintenance of the ship.

== Lord High Admiral Watson ==
The present leader of the Landship is former Captain Vernon Watson, who was promoted to Lord High Admiral when the BLA celebrated its 145th anniversary in 2008. Admiral Watson, who was also awarded an Order of the British Empire (OBE) by the Queen in 1998 and is a Justice of the Peace, was a keen follower of the landship movement as a young child. His father was Lord High Admiral Nathaniel Watson.

Lord High Admiral Watson recalls in the early days that there was a Landship organisation in every parish of Barbados, with great interest among young Barbadians. The Landship was a popular form of merriment and entertainment for villagers and workers on the plantations. He became actively involved in the movement in 1972 when he noticed a state of growing lawlessness among young people in his district and felt there was a need to keep the children active. He approached his father with the idea of forming a Landship in his community as a means of engaging these youths. His father approved of the idea which led to the formation of the Director I, based in Highlands, St. Thomas. Admiral Watson was sworn in as an official member of the Barbados Landship Association on 24 March 1972.

During that period, there were five existing Landships: the Rodney, Cornwall, Iron Duke, Queen Mary II, and the Vanguard. When Admiral Watson refloated Director I and became an active member of the Landship, he assisted with forming the Queen Victoria in Rose Hill, St Peter, the Director II in Carrington Village, St Michael and then the Indefatigable in Back Ivy, St Michael.

There were some 700 members among these ships, but since that period the vessels have floundered and the Admiral brought all members together to form one ship under one Association, called, the Barbados Landship Association. At present there are 30 active members in the BLA who parade, and overall there are 40 persons involved in the movement, with the original crew of the Director forming the core of the group.

== Landship activities ==
The Barbados Landship has performed across the 'length and breadth' of Barbados especially during the heyday of the 1970s and 1980s. They have been on stage at Government House, Ilaro Court, Harrison's Cave and more recently De Heart uh Barbados. They have represented Barbados culture in the region's CARIFESTA in countries such as Trinidad, Cuba, Suriname and Guyana, to participate in cultural festivals.

The Barbados Landship also participates in all local festivals including Crop-Over, Holetown Festival, Oistins Fish Festival, Independence Day parades and NIFCA. It also participates in the Barbados Workers' Union's (BWU) Labour Day celebrations since its inception and is an associate member of the BWU.

This dedication has led to awards from both organisations, along with honours from the Ministry of Tourism for its significant contribution to Barbados' cultural and historical landscape. Admiral Watson opines that the Landship, "is the best thing in Barbados". He believes that the cultural group has done more than any other for culture in Barbados, noting that during and after the days of slavery, the movement was "the one cultural event that black persons could look forward to on Sundays, Bank Holidays and at Christmas."

=== Dock gatherings ===
The headquarters of a Landship is called the Dock. It is usually a small chattel house and would have the painting of a ship on it. Traditionally, every Friday night is Dock night. It is a time when all the members get together and have short meetings, during which they pay dues and conduct Landship business. Afterwards, members socialise until an appointed hour after which they depart the Dock.

There is nothing in the rules preventing ships or clubs from designating a convenient day and time for Dock gatherings. Drills and rehearsals are also arranged to the convenience of members and members are required to attend all parades.

=== Parades and performances ===
The Landship takes part in the Independence Day Parade annually. It also participates in other national parades when called upon to do so. Members are required to present themselves for national parades. This rule is less strict for performances and the Ship may decide how many members will take part in a performance.

=== Benefits ===
The Landship represents not simply a cultural icon but an institution which strives to be relevant to the very existence of its members. The Landship to the lives of Barbadians was a Credit Union, a Bank, a Welfare Department, a Counsellor, Entertainment on special occasions, a coordinator of training and apprenticeship and, in general, a friend and family when one is needed.

Every end of the year, members who performed at the various events are given a bonus. Your bonus will depend on the frequency of attending performances and members are judged according to decorum

=== Objectives ===
The main objective of the Landship is to provide support for its less fortunate members and incentives for all its members to assist them in achieving their stated potential. However, the Landship is also very much concerned with the general development of its members and endeavours to remain relevant to its members bearing in mind the struggles of the People and their effort to attain economic empowerment.

== Future of the Barbados Landship ==
The Lord High Admiral has been instrumental in getting the Landship into the schools and teaching the craft to other groups including the Yoruba Dancers, Pinelands Creative Workshop and Dancin' Africa. He welcomes other groups who wish to learn the craft of the Landship.

Barbados Association of Non Governmental Organisations (BANGO) has been working with the Barbados Landship for nearly two decades, providing secretariat services in order to enhance the visibility and capacity of this cultural organisation and to help preserve an important aspect of Barbadian culture. The Secretary General of BANGO has placed great emphasis on officially documenting the history of the Landship and was very instrumental in publishing its first book, written by Editha G. (Nancy) Fergusson-Jacobs in September 2013, to coincide with its 150th anniversary. Prior to this, he completed the first written record of its rules in 1991 and produced a draft handbook for members, but this remains unpublished.

The Barbados Landship remains part of the cultural landscape of Barbados. During the organisation's 150th anniversary celebrations in 2013, Lord High Admiral Watson was among those recognised for their efforts to preserve Barbadian folk culture. The Landship reflects aspects of Barbados' history and cultural heritage.

== Notes ==
1. Fergusson-Jacobs, Editha (Nancy): "Full Steam Ahead - Locating the Barbados Landship" September, 2013
2. Forde, Addington et al.: The A-Z of Barbadian Heritage, MacMillan Caribbean Series, 2004.
3. Downes, Aviston: "Sailing from Colonial into National Waters: A History of the Barbados Landship." Journal of the Barbados Museum and Historical Society Vol. XLVI, 2000. "Friendly Societies in Barbados: An Oral History." (paper); "Searching for Admiral Moses Wood: Oral Tradition and the history of the Landship" Journal of the Barbados Museum and Historical Society Vol. XLVIII, Nov 2002, 64 –78.
4. Gilmore, John: "Landship and Tuk Band" New Bajan July, 1988.
5. Lynch, Louis: The Barbados Book. London: Andre Deutsch Ltd., 1969.
6. Mottley, Elombe: "Ahoy de Landship pon de Reef!" (Article).
7. Vaughn, H. A: 'Some Local and Political Changes 1910 – 35.' In J.M. Hewitt (ed.) Silver Jubilee Magazine (Bridgetown, 1935), 31-32.

== See also ==
- Spiritual Baptist, aspects of which reflect similarity to Landship
