= Anthony Kellman =

American writer

- Born: 24 April 1955 (age 71); Whitehall, Saint Michael, Barbados
- Education: University of the West Indies Louisiana State University
- Occupations: Poet; novelist; musician; professor emeritus of English and creative writing at Augusta University

Anthony Kellman (born 24 April 1955) is a Barbados-born poet, novelist, and musician.

In 1990, the British publishing house Peepal Tree Press published his first full-length book of poetry, Watercourse, which was endorsed by the late Martiniquan poet Edouard Glissant and which launched Kellman's international writing career. Since 1990, he has published three novels, four CD recordings of original songs, and four additional books of poetry, including Limestone: An Epic Poem of Barbados, the island's first published epic poem which covers over four centuries of Barbadian life.

In 1992, he edited the first full-length U.S. anthology of English-language Caribbean poetry, Crossing Water, and in 1993, he received a U.S. National Endowment for the Arts Poetry Fellowship.

Kellman is the originator of the Barbados poetic form Tuk Verse, derived from melodic and rhythmical patterns of Barbados's indigenous folk music.

== Early life ==
Kellman was born in Whitehall, Saint Michael, Barbados, and attended Combermere Secondary School. At the age of eighteen, he left for England, where he worked as a troubadour, playing pop and West Indian folk music on the pub and folk club circuit. He also became involved in the London literary scene mainly through the Poetry Society and the late Peter Forbes, former editor of London's Poetry Review. Members met in the London district of Earl's Court to share and discuss their works.

== Career ==
When Kellman returned to Barbados, he took an English undergraduate degree at the University of the West Indies and published two poetry chapbooks, In Depths of Burning Light (1982) and The Broken Sun (1984), which drew praise from Kamau Brathwaite, among others. He worked as a newspaper reporter, an arts and literature review columnist, and in public relations (first at the Central Bank of Barbados and then at the National Cultural Foundation), before immigrating to the U.S. in 1987. His experiences at the Central Bank provided inspiration for his first novel The Coral Rooms (1994).

In 1987, he studied for a Masters of Fine Arts degree in creative writing at Louisiana State University. After completing in 1989 he joined the English Department at Augusta University, where he is professor emeritus of English & Creative Writing. He has been the longest-serving director of the university's Sandhills Writers Conference & Series which he directed from 1989 to 2015, a period which featured major national and international authors, including Ray Bradbury, Maxine Hong Kingston, Derek Walcott, Edward Albee, Gloria Naylor, and Rick Bragg. Kellman is also the founder and coordinator of the Summerville Reading Series, a community literary and musical performance series (1989–1994), and A Winter Gathering of Writers (1990–2010).

In 1992, he edited the first full-length U.S. anthology of English-language Caribbean poetry, Crossing Water, and, in 1993, he received a U.S. National Endowment for the Arts Poetry Fellowship. He won the 2011 Prime Minister's Award (Barbados) for his poetry manuscript South Eastern Stages which also highlighted his Tuk Verse forms and was published in 2012.

Kellman's creative and critical writing have been published in anthologies and literary periodicals in the Caribbean, Latin America, the U.S., England, Wales, Canada and India. In 1998, his first theoretical essay on Tuk Verse was published in the London international magazine Wasafiri.

He finds considerable resonances between the Caribbean and the Southern states of the U.S., which feed into his poetry, where blue jays, dogwoods and wisteria rub shoulders with angel fish, sugarcane and coral reefs. All his work has a powerful involvement with landscape, both as a living entity shaping people's lives and as a source of metaphor for inner processes. The limestone caves of Barbados have provided a particularly fertile source of inspiration. Kellman's imagistic style (in his poems, novels and songs) moves between the indigenous and the international, the concrete and the universal, Barbadian vernacular English and standard English, the personal and the public, and between the contemporary moment and the historical past.

Kellman continues to compose and perform eclectic folk songs in the world music/singer-songwriter genres. His four albums are Wings of a Stranger (2000), Limestone (2005) (both companions to the poetry books by the same titles), Bloodmates (2010), and Come Again: The Best of Anthony Kellman (2011).

== Publications ==
- In Depths of Burning Light, 1982 (poems, chapbook)
- The Broken Sun, 1984 (poems, chapbook)
- Watercourse, 1990 (poems)
- Crossing Water: Contemporary Poetry of the English-Speaking Caribbean, Editor, 1992 (anthology)
- The Coral Rooms, 1994 (novel)
- The Long Gap, 1996 (poems)
- Wings of a Stranger, 2000 (poems with companion music CD)
- The Houses of Alphonso, 2004 (novel)
- Limestone: An Epic Poem of Barbados, 2008 (with companion music CD)
- Blood Mates, 2009 (music CD)
- Come Again: The Best of Anthony Kellman, 2011 (music CD)
- South Eastern Stages, 2012 (poems)
- Tracing Jaja, 2016 (novel)

== See also ==
- Caribbean literature
- Caribbean poetry
- List of Caribbean music genres
- Music of Barbados
- Postcolonial literature
- Epic poetry
