= National Independence Festival of Creative Arts =

- Status: Active (2020's event cancelled)
- Genre: National arts festival
- Frequency: Annual
- Country: Barbados
- Years active: 1973 - present
- Website: www.ncf.bb

The National Independence Festival of Creative Arts (NIFCA) is a festival organized by the National Cultural Foundation, held annually to commemorate the independence of Barbados.

Music and other performing arts have been a part of the festival since it was inaugurated in 1973, with the disciplines showcased today including: drama, dance, music, literary arts, fine art and craft, culinary arts and photography. Successful performers are awarded with gold, silver or bronze awards, with other awards, such as the Governor General's Award of Excellence, being available to entrants in particular categories.

2020's Crop Over and NIFCA were both cancelled due to the COVID-19 pandemic.
