= Lil Rick =

Barbadian singer

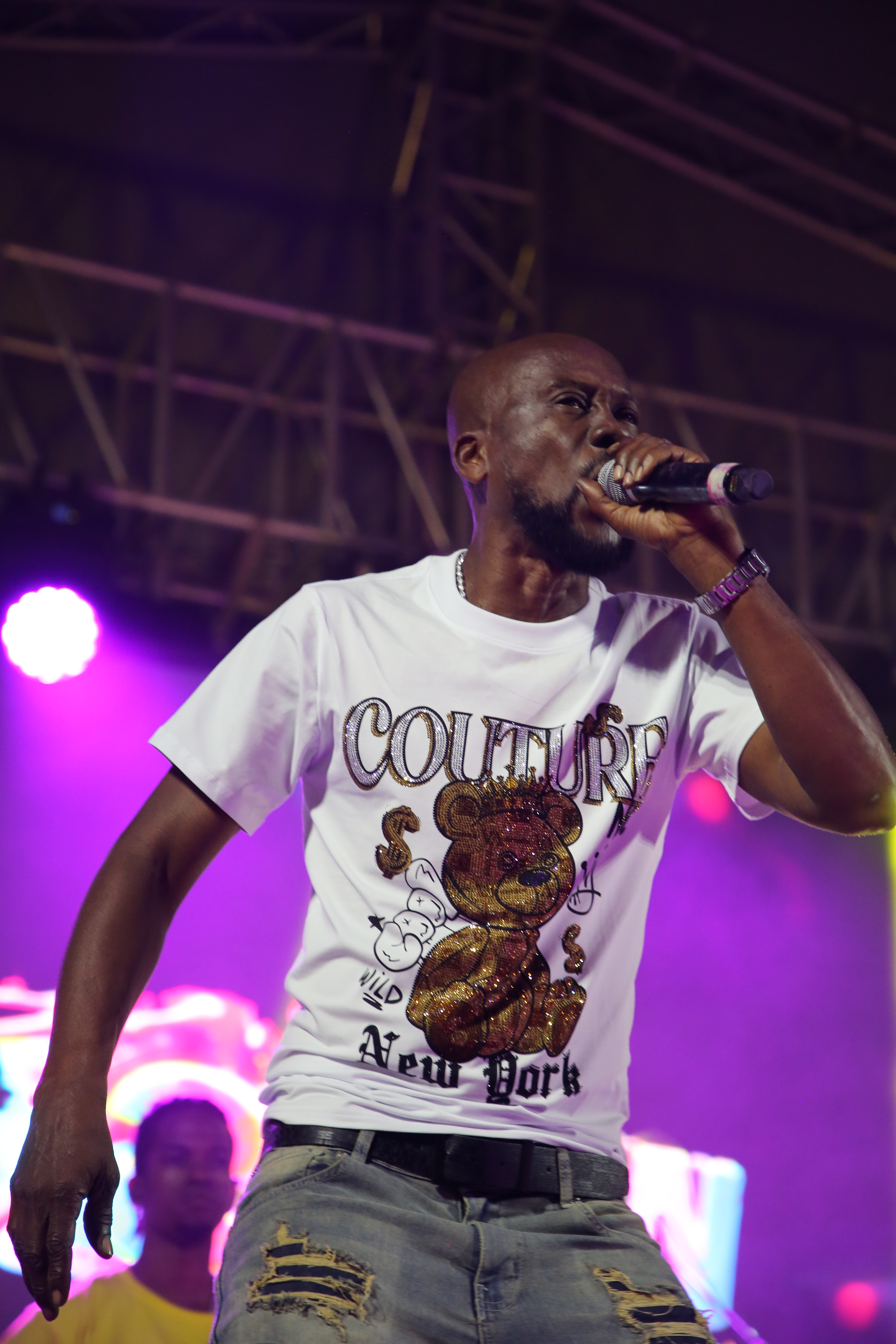
Rick at Wuss Fete 2025 in Grenada for SpiceMas.

Ricky Reid, known professionally as Lil Rick, is a calypsonian, soca musician and DJ from Barbados. He is one of the most popular and successful musicians in the history of Barbados.

== Biography ==
Reid began as a club DJ in the early 1990s, focused on Jamaican dancehall reggae music rather than the local calypso. Reid transitioned to singing calypso & soca in 1996 after meeting producer Peter Coppin, coming into prominence with hits such as Hard Wine and Bumper Inspector. He has been credited with innovating the genre of "bashment soca", similar to "power soca" in Trinidad and Tobago and dancehall reggae of Jamaica.

His profile increased in 1998 after winning the Party Monarch honour during Barbados' annual Crop Over festival with Down Behind the Truck. He later won the title with tunes such as Mash Up And Buy Back, Caan Wait and Hypa Dawg, the latter which became an adopted nickname. His overall Crop Over title count, as of 2024, includes being a four-time Tune of the Crop ("Pic-O-De-Crop") winner, six-time Party Monarch winner, and Sweet Soca Monarch in 2018.

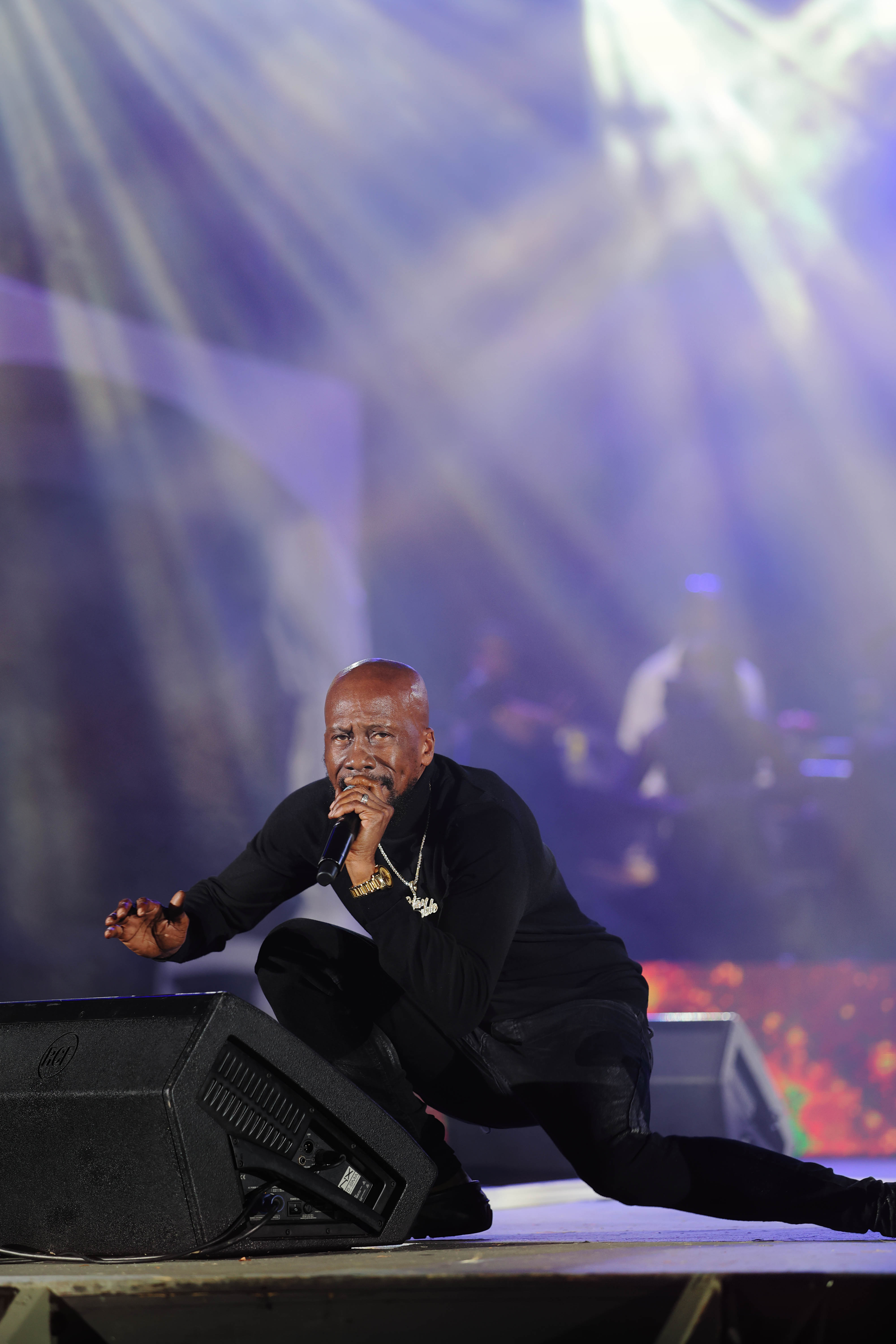
Lil Rick performing at Crop Over in Barbados

== Personal life ==
Reid married long-time girlfriend Caragh Smith in 2015. They have sons Renee and Rinicko and daughter Rickara, all of whom have entered the music business.
