= Renée A. Blake =

American linguist

Renée A. Blake is a Latina Caribbean-American linguistics professor at New York University.

== Biography ==
Renée A. Blake is a second-generation Caribbean American by way of Trinidad and Venezuela. She is an associate professor in the Departments of Linguistics and Social & Cultural Analysis at New York University. She also serves as a Faculty Fellow in Residence at New York University.

Blake started and completed her tertiary level education at Stanford University. She received her Ph.D. in linguistics from Stanford in 1997, with a dissertation entitled, "All O' We is One? Race, class, and language in a Barbados community." Her research examines language contact, race, ethnicity and class with a focus on African-American English, Caribbean English Creoles and New York City English. She has two web-based linguistic sites: Word. The Online Journal on African American English and "Voices of New York".

She is the recipient of several grants including Fulbright, Rockefeller and National Science Foundation. In 2010, she was awarded the Martin Luther King Jr. Faculty Award at New York University. She has also served as a consultant to organizations including Disney and the Ford Foundation.

She is the daughter of the film producer Grace Blake and the sister of the actor Andre B. Blake.

== Published works (selected) ==
- 2010. "Second Generation West Indian Americans and English in New York City," in English Today 26(3): 35-43 (with Cara Shousterman).
- 2010. "Diachrony and AAE: St. Louis, Hip-Hop and Sound Change Outside of the Mainstream," Journal of English Linguistics 38(3): 230-247 (with Cara Shousterman).
- 2005. "Speaking Strictly Roots (West Indies)," in Walt Wolfram and Ben Ward (eds.), American Voices. Oxford: Blackwell, pp. 172–78.
- 2004. "Bajan Phonology." In Bernd Kortmann and Edgar W. Schneider (ed.), A Handbook of Varieties of English: Volume 1. Berlin: Mouton de Gruyter.
- 2003b. "African American Vernacular English and Variation in Teachers' Attitudes: A Question of School Philosophy?" Linguistics and Education 14(2):163-94 (with Cecilia Cutler).
- 2003a. "The /ay/ Diphthong in a Martha's Vineyard Community: What Can We Say 40 Years Later?" (with Meredith Josey). Language in Society 32(4):451-85.
