= Magnet Man =

- Also known as: MagnetMan, TheMagnetMan
- Origin: Barbados
- Genres: RnB, hip hop, ragga, soca, soul, Latin, rock, and pop
- Occupations: Singer, songwriter, composer, musician, producer, actor
- Years active: 2000–present
- Label: Magnetic Image Records
- Website: magnetman1.com

Magnet Man (Sometimes referred to as "Magnetman" and "TheMagnetMan") is a singer, songwriter, composer, musician, producer and actor. Sometimes known as "The Man of Many voices" and "Musical Ambassador for Barbados", his music spans a broad range of genres, fusing RnB, hip-hop, tagga, doca, doul, Latin, rock, and pop.

== Early life ==
Magnet Man was born in the late 1970s on the island of Barbados and raised in the Silver Hill Christ Church area, which is located in the south of the island. He started singing at a young age, with an early ambition to have a music career and travel around the globe.

== Music career ==
=== 4 de People ===
From 2000 to 2003, he was a member of Bajan group 4 de People. He spent a lot of time touring the Caribbean as well as the United States, Canada and Venezuela.

=== Solo career ===
In late 2003, Magnet Man went solo and his first performances were on an international stadium tour with Busta Rhymes. Stadiums included on the tour were Wembley Arena, London Arena and Wettingen in Switzerland. Magnet Man has also performed in concert with Shaggy, Ja Rule, Ashanti, and Beres Hammond. At Edinburgh's Live 8 summit, He sang a song with Daniel Bedingfield to 220,000 people. Shortly after this, Magnet Man formed his own charity Make A Difference Foundation. In 2004, he collaborated with DJ Anne Savage to release the single "Wuck U Right".

In 2005, he performed in 14 countries, including Germany's Popkomm Festival attended by 17,000 music industry executives. He also performed in a sponsored Official 2005 MIDEM showcase in Cannes, France, where he was one of only eight acts in the world to be selected from thousands of submissions by worldwide record labels. In 2006 he again performed all over the world including headlining concerts in Grenada, Barbados, The Bahamas, Scotland, Germany and all around England plus he headlined a Virgin Atlantic concert at Leeds and Readings Potter Newton Park Concert.

Magnet Man was appointed officially to represent UNICEF Bremen in 2006 as they have adopted his charity song "Make A Difference" as their official song for two UNICEF Bremen campaigns Schools For Africa and Kids & Aids. His song "Eskape to the Muzic" was also used as a campaign song for UNICEF.

In December 2006 at the Bahamas International Film Festival, Magnet Man appeared in his first movie entitled From Barbados With Love where he had a lead role. He also wrote, performed and produced the movie's soundtrack. In January 2007 Magnet Man was awarded BMA Platinum certification at the Barbados Music Awards for debut album Magnificent, and also beat Rihanna to win the Best Music Video Award.

His song "Wanna Flex" made the Caribbean Top 40 Chart, and was fully released in the UK and Germany in 2007. The music video, filmed on the beach in Barbados at midnight, has appeared on music channels Channel U and Fizz. Magnet Man's second album called Many Sides of Me was released in October 2007 in the UK as a physical CD and worldwide digitally on Internet sites.

Magnet Man's 2 new singles were due to be released in Feb 2008, a rocked up version of "Eskape to the Muzic" which was very popular in USA, and a song entitled "Bajan Bad Man", which is a 'tongue in cheek' title for a fun track. Two new music videos were released in December 2007 and Magnet Man would appear singing live and being interviewed in a half-hour programme called Unthugged on Channel U (which was Sky channel 360 at the time). Magnet Man is also featured on Channel Us 2nd compilation out approximately January/February 2008.

In 2009, he released the ragga-rock track "Ready to Fly" and toured the UK, including performing at the Oldham Carnival. Magnet Man was featured in January 2013 on BBC Radio Norfolk in discussion with Stephen Bumfrey reflecting on subjects such as his album Ragga Rock, miniature horses, and touring in Cuba.

== Personal life ==
Magnet Man married Magnetic Records executive Image Allison on 17 November 2005 in Ireland, followed by a second ceremony on 24 November in Barbados.
