= HMS Rodney =

Six ships of the Royal Navy have been named HMS Rodney, of which at least the last five were named after the Georgian Admiral George, Lord Rodney. A seventh was planned but never completed:

- HMS Rodney (1759) was a 4-gun cutter in use in 1759.
- HMS Rodney (1781) was a 16-gun vessel, possibly a brig-sloop, purchased in 1780, probably in the Caribbean, and in service in 1781. The French Rohan-Soubise captured her in 1782 at Demerara. In June 1783 she sailed for St. Pierre and Miquelon. She was struck from the lists at Rochefort in December, and from the Navy lists in 1784.
- HMS Rodney (1809) was a 74-gun third rate launched in 1809, razeed to 50 guns and renamed Greenwich in 1827, and sold in 1836.
- HMS Rodney (1833) was a 90-gun second rate launched in 1833, converted to screw propulsion and rearmed with 70 guns in 1860, and broken up in 1884.
- HMS Rodney (1884) was an Admiral-class battleship launched in 1884 and sold in 1909.
- HMS Rodney (1916) was to have been an Admiral-class battlecruiser. She was ordered in April 1916, but construction was suspended in March 1917 and cancelled in October 1918.
- HMS Rodney (29) was a Nelson-class battleship launched in 1925 and broken up in 1948.

== Battle honours ==
- Quebec 1759
- Syria 1840
- Crimea 1854–55
- Norway 1940
- Atlantic 1940–41
- Bismarck 1941
- Malta Convoys 1941–42
- North Africa 1942–43
- Sicily 1943
- Salerno 1943
- Mediterranean 1943
- English Channel 1944
- Normandy 1944
- Arctic 1944
