= Tuk band =

A tuk band is a kind of Barbadian musical ensemble, which plays tuk or rukatuk music. They consist of a double-headed bass drum, triangle, flute and a snare drum; the traditional fiddle has most recently been replaced by the pennywhistle. The tuk band is based on the regimental bands of the British military, which played frequently during the colonial era. The Tuk Band is accompanied by characters that are African in origin. African tribes used costumed figures to represent elements such as fertility, witch doctors, and describing routes of commercial transportation, as well as having survived difficult times.

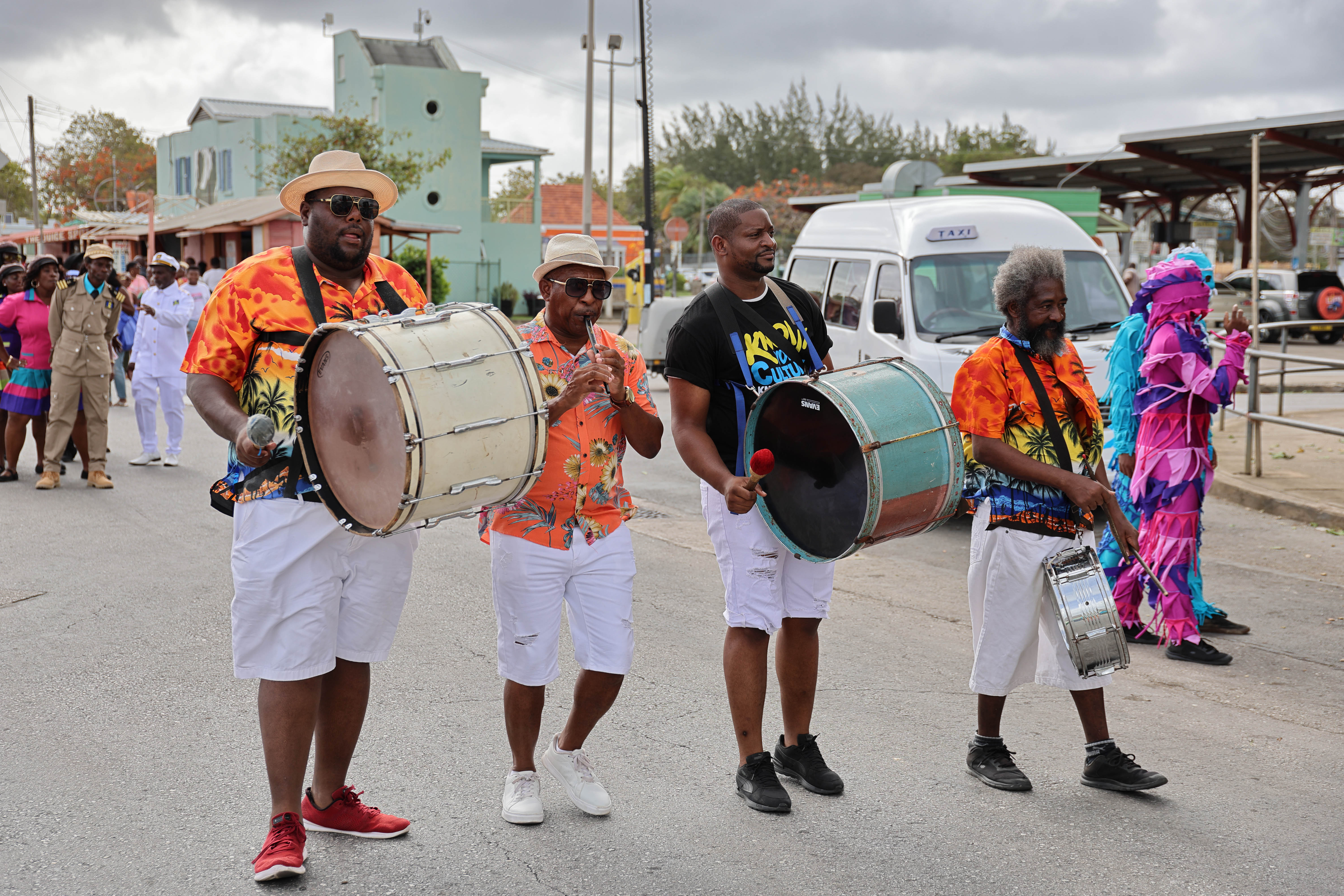
Tuk Band at Crop Over in Barbados

In the Barbados Tuk Band, the regular costumed figures are Shaggy Bear (who is sometimes called the Bank Holiday Bear), the Donkey Man, Mother Sally, a masked man dressed up like a woman with an exaggerated behind, and the Stiltman.

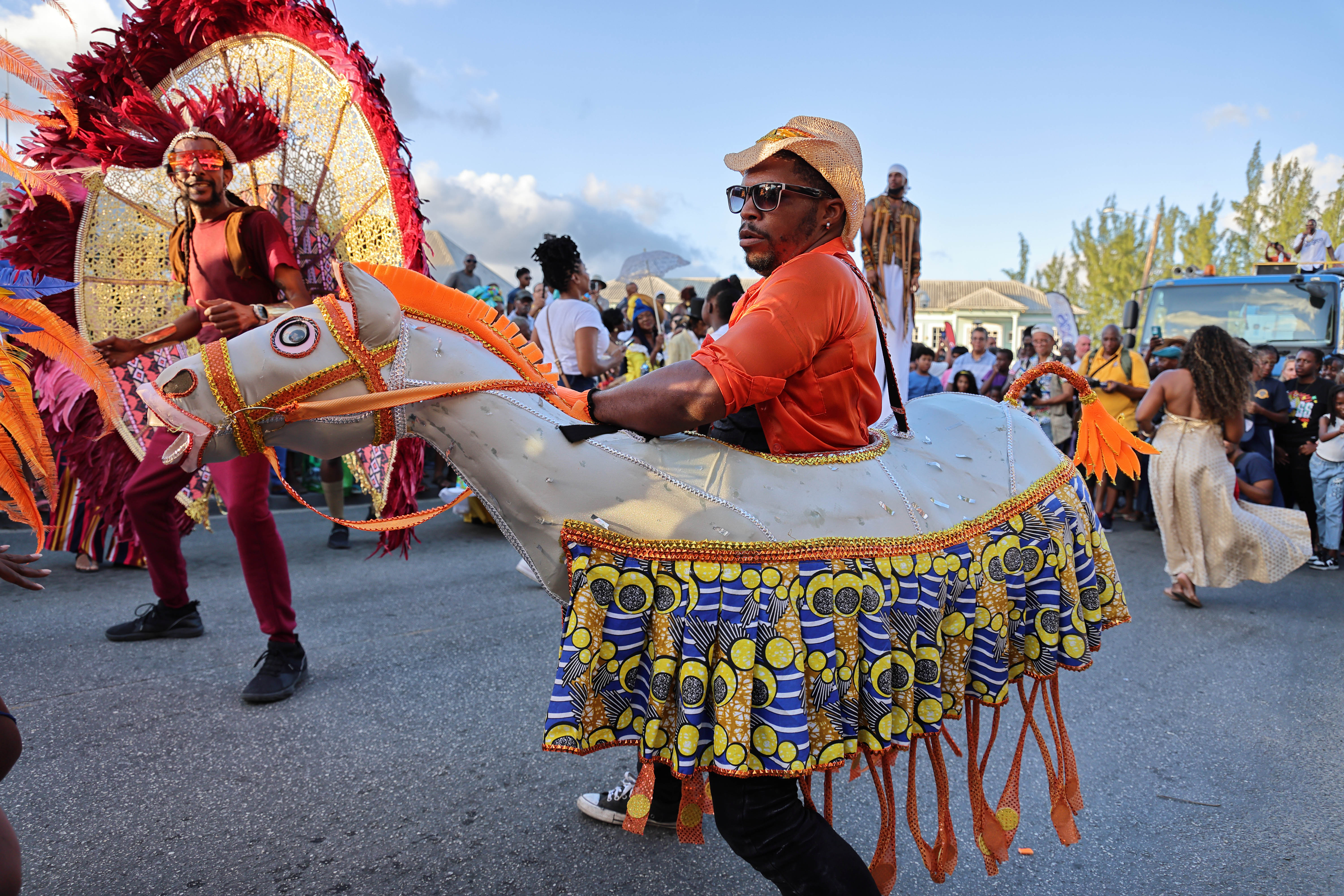
Barbadian character normally associated with Tuk Bands

Shaggy Bear is said to represent an African witch doctor figure. Shaggy gained a reputation as the Bank Holiday Bear because he always shows up on island Bank Holidays. Other Caribbean islands like Jamaica have their own Shaggy Bear figure which goes under a different name.

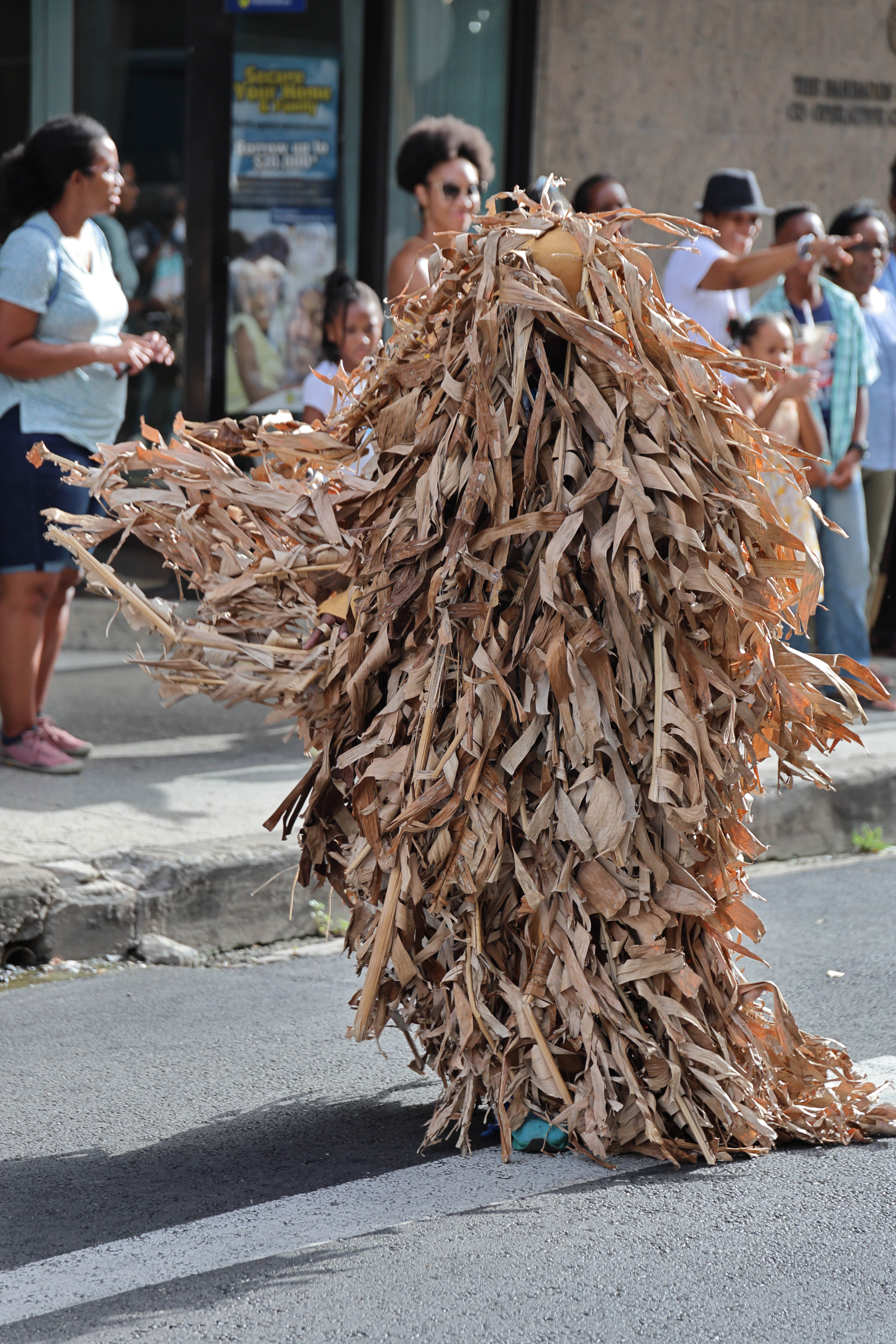
Shaggy bear at Crop Over in Barbados

The Donkey Cart was an important means of transportation in the past, and the Donkey Man is representative of the island transportation that was used by the locals. Mother Sally represents the female fertility, and with an exaggerated back end. Mother Sally is always good for a laugh, and a favorite among Bajans and visitors alike.

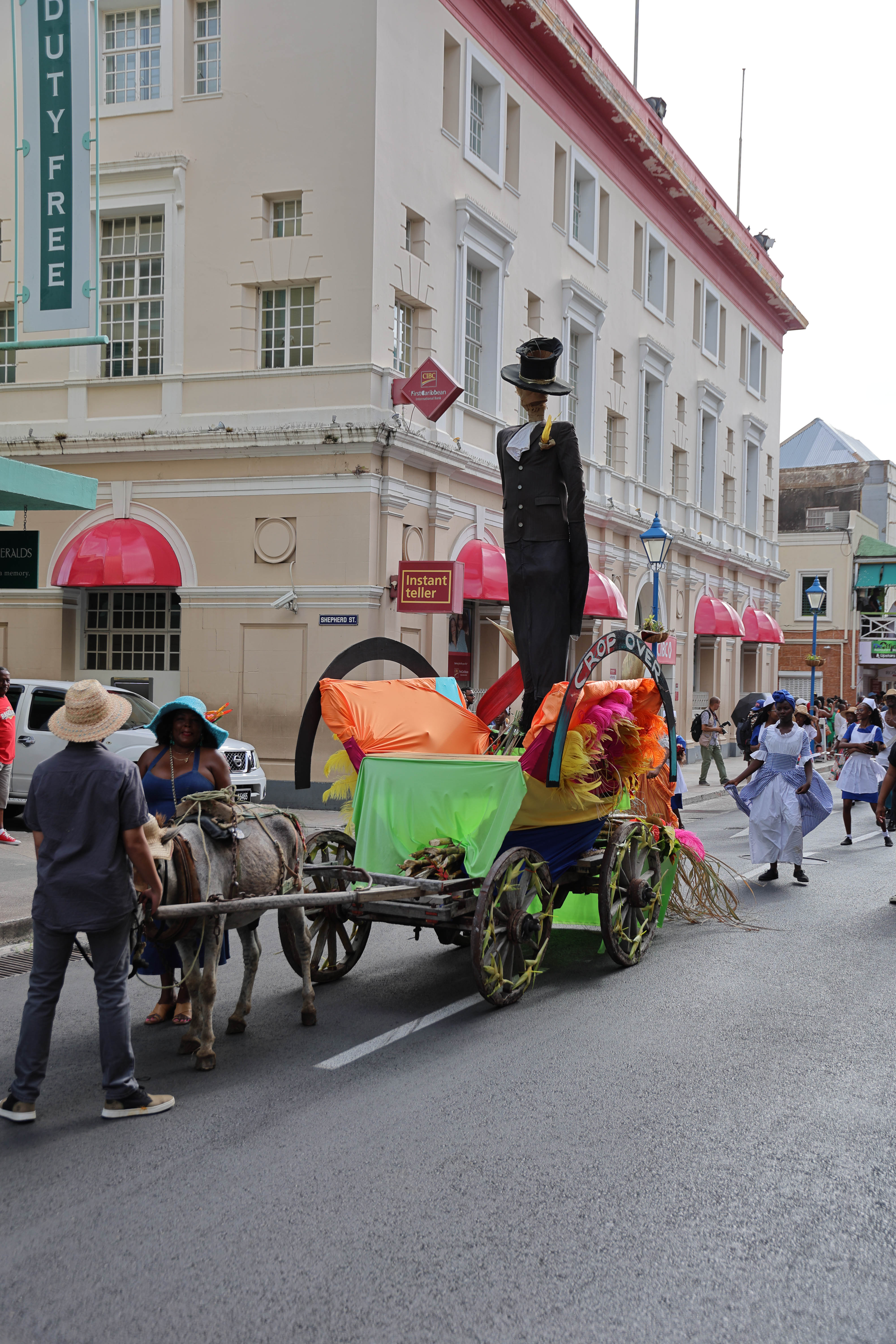
Donkey cart with Mr. Harding effigy at Crop Over in Barbados

The Stiltman is another character that accompanies the Tuk Band, and is also seen on Bank Holidays. The Stiltman represents surviving hard times, and the effigy of Mr. Hardin.

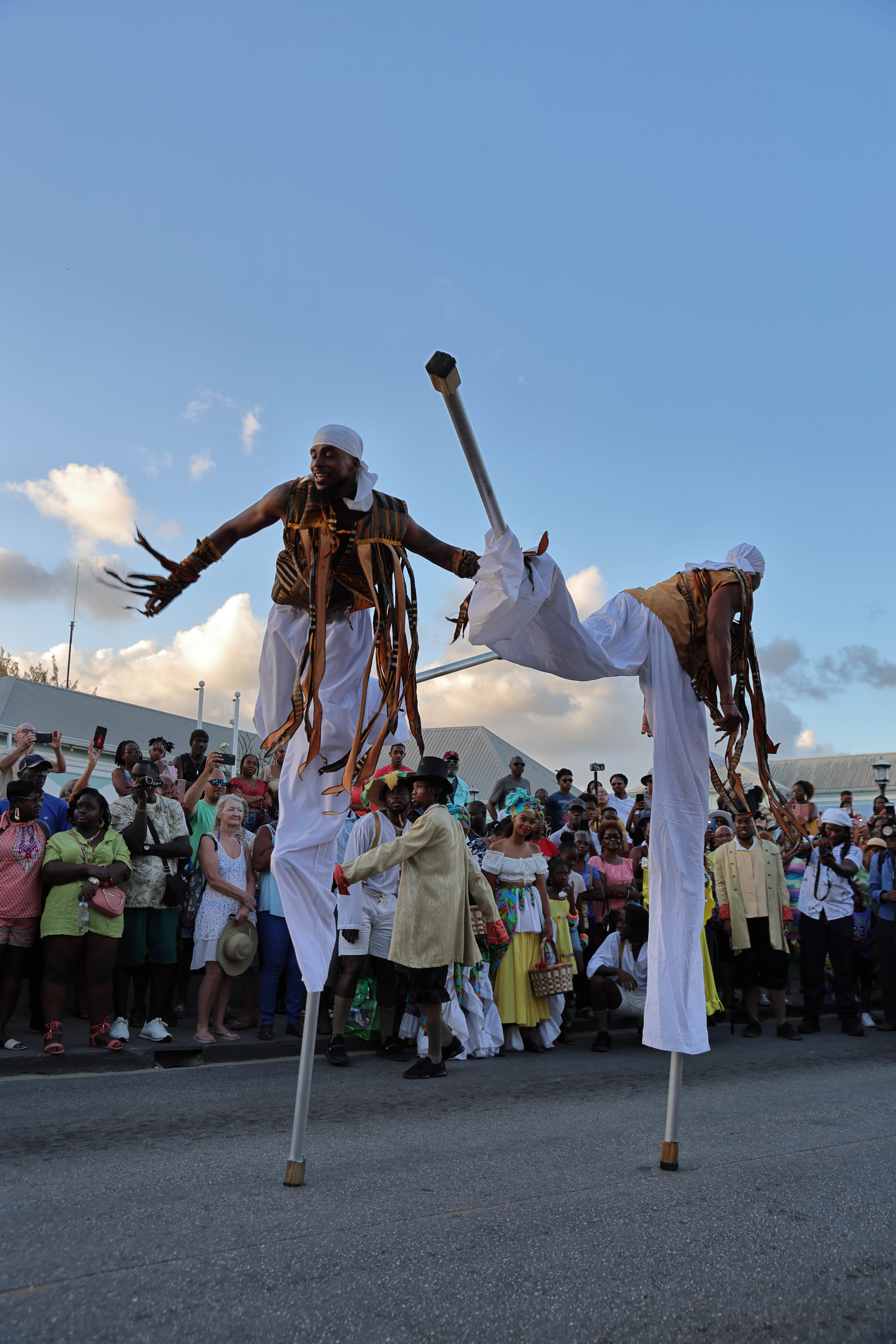
Barbadian stilt walkers at Holetown Festival

Tuk Bands perform during island festivals such as Crop Over, the Holetown Festival, and at Christmas and New Years. The trio provides musical accompaniment for The Landship.

== History ==
After being colonized in 1627 by the British, "Little England" (as Barbados was called) had much fusion of music. Eighty Englishmen and ten Africans were captured from a Spanish galleon and settled in Barbados in February in 1627. The result of this mixture of people was "African-based drum music and British folk ballads and religious songs ultimately led to the distinctively Barbadian sound of traditional tuk band music".

HISTORY OF THE TUK BAND

The music of the drums was brought to the island of Barbados by African slaves who arrived on the island in the mid-1600s.

The newly initiated slaves were forced to leave their drums behind, but found the Mahogany trees on the island well suited for the drum base, and they fashioned the drum skin from sheep, goats and cattle.

The English slave owners instituted a law in the late 1600s to outlaw the playing of drums, with one of the penalties being death.

The plantation owners were afraid the slaves would use the drums to "talk to each other", and organize rebellions.

The drums were an intricate part of the African culture, and the African slaves could no more stop playing the drum as they could stop breathing.

The slaves simply altered their drum playing to sound like the music of the English fife and drum corps. After this was accomplished, they played during the weekend celebrations and when away from the sugar cane fields.

No doubt the slaves did figure out a way to communicate with their drums, and Barbados was one of the earlier islands to abolish slavery.
