= Cou-cou =

Caribbean dish of cornmeal and okra

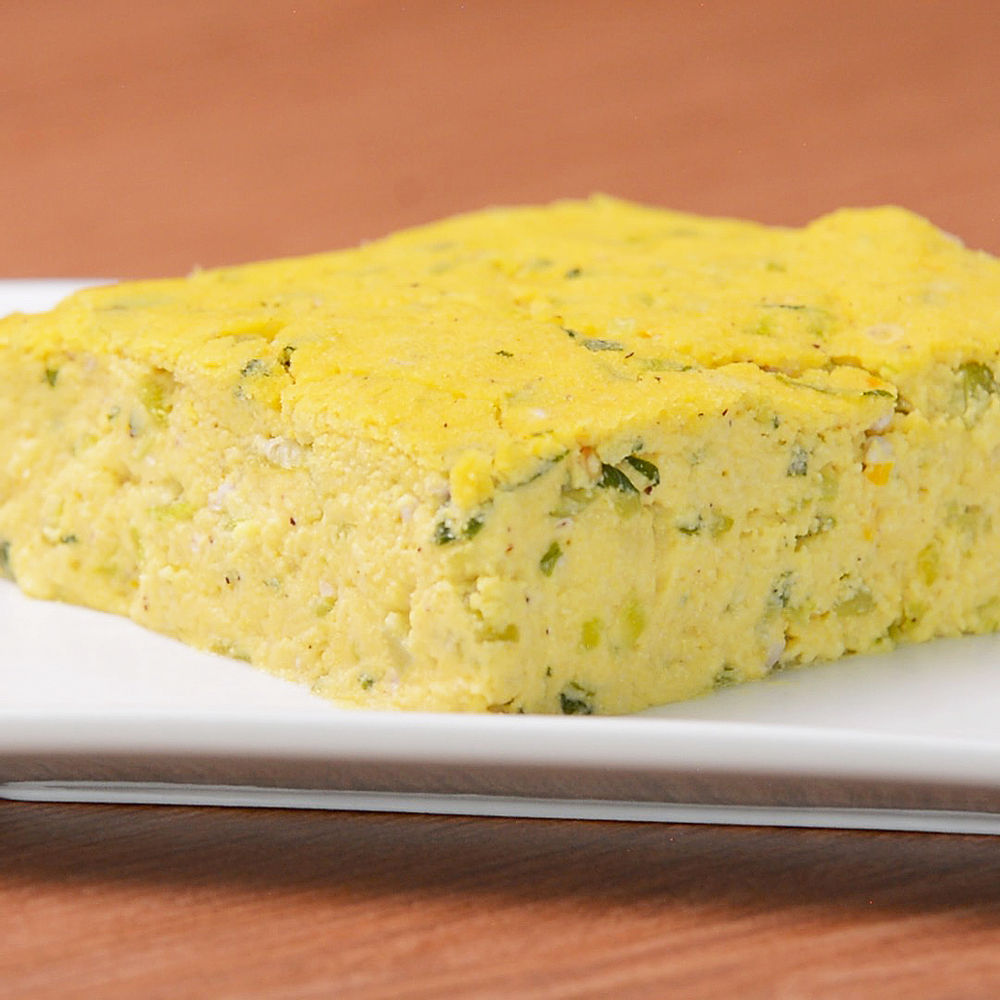
Cou-cou

Cou-cou, coo-coo (as it is known in the Windward Islands), or fungee (as it is known in the Leeward Islands and Dominica), makes up part of the national dishes of Antigua and Barbuda, Barbados, British Virgin Islands and the U.S. Virgin Islands. It consists mainly of cornmeal (corn flour) and okra (ochroes). Cornmeal, which comes readily packaged and is available at supermarkets islandwide, and okra, which can be found at supermarkets, vegetable markets and home gardens, are very inexpensive ingredients. Because these main components are inexpensive, the dish became common for many residents in Barbados' early colonial history. In Angola, a similar meal is made with yellow or white cornmeal and called 'funge' and in Ghana, a similar meal of fermented corn or maize flour eaten with okra stew and fish is known as banku, a favourite dish of the Ga tribe in Accra.

A cooking utensil called a 'cou-cou stick', or 'fungee stick', is a type of spurtle used in its preparation. A cou-cou stick is made of wood, and has a long, flat rectangular shape like a 1-foot-long (30 cm) miniature cricket bat. It is believed by Barbadians to be essential in stirring the cou-cou, as the dish takes on a firm texture and the cou-cou stick makes it easier to stir in a large pot.

Flying fish prepared fried or steamed is a usual complement to cou-cou. Cou-cou and flying fish is Barbados' national dish. Traditionally, cou-cou is served on Fridays at homes across Barbados and local food establishments. Cou-cou can also be prepared using breadfruit instead of cornmeal.

In Trinidad and Tobago, cou-cou (or coo-coo) is often prepared alongside callaloo and either stewed or fried fish.

== See also ==
- List of maize dishes
