= Kittle (Guyana) =

Unpitched percussion instrument

The kittle drum (also kittel or skittel) is a narrow drum with one goat skin head. It differs from the kettle (or kittle) drum used elsewhere in the Anglophone Caribbean, which usually is "a small two-headed drum hung around the neck".

In Guyanese masquerade and street bands, the kittle is played with two mallets to give a syncopated rhythm as a counter-rhythm to the bass drum (bhoom, which keeps the beat). Guyanese slaves used to celebrate the end of the crop season when the farms owners would allow them to perform with drums, dance and singing. In the 1990s, attempts were made to revive the Guyanese masquerade bands (mainly performed at Christmas, although there are no traditional links between the masquerade and the Christian celebration of the Nativity of Jesus), but they appeared to be in decline by the 2010s.

== Bibliography ==
- Kuss, Malena (2004). Music in Latin America and the Caribbean: an encyclopedic history. University of Texas Press. ISBN 978-0-292-70951-5.
- Hutchinson, Sydney (2019-10-22). Focus: Music of the Caribbean. New York: Routledge. ISBN 978-1-351-60299-0.
- Olsen, Dale A.; Sheehy, Daniel E. (2017-09-25). The Garland Encyclopedia of World Music. Routledge. ISBN 978-1-351-54423-8.
