= Red Plastic Bag =

Barbadian singer

- Also known as: Red Plastic Bag / RPB
- Born: Stedson Ewart Wiltshire
- Origin: Saint Philip, Barbados
- Genres: Calypso, soca
- Occupations: Musician, singer-songwriter
- Instrument: Vocals
- Years active: 1979–present

Stedson Ewart Wiltshire, better known by the sobriquet of Red Plastic Bag, RPB, or merely Bag, is a calypsonian from Barbados. He is sixty-five years old as of 2026. He has won the Barbadian calypso monarch competition a record ten times. Hailing from the eastern, rural Barbadian parish of Bayfield, Saint Philip, RPB became one of few performers from that region on the island to become successful. He carries a large support group of fans that show up to cheer him on from Stand C when he performs against other calypsonians at Barbados National Stadium.

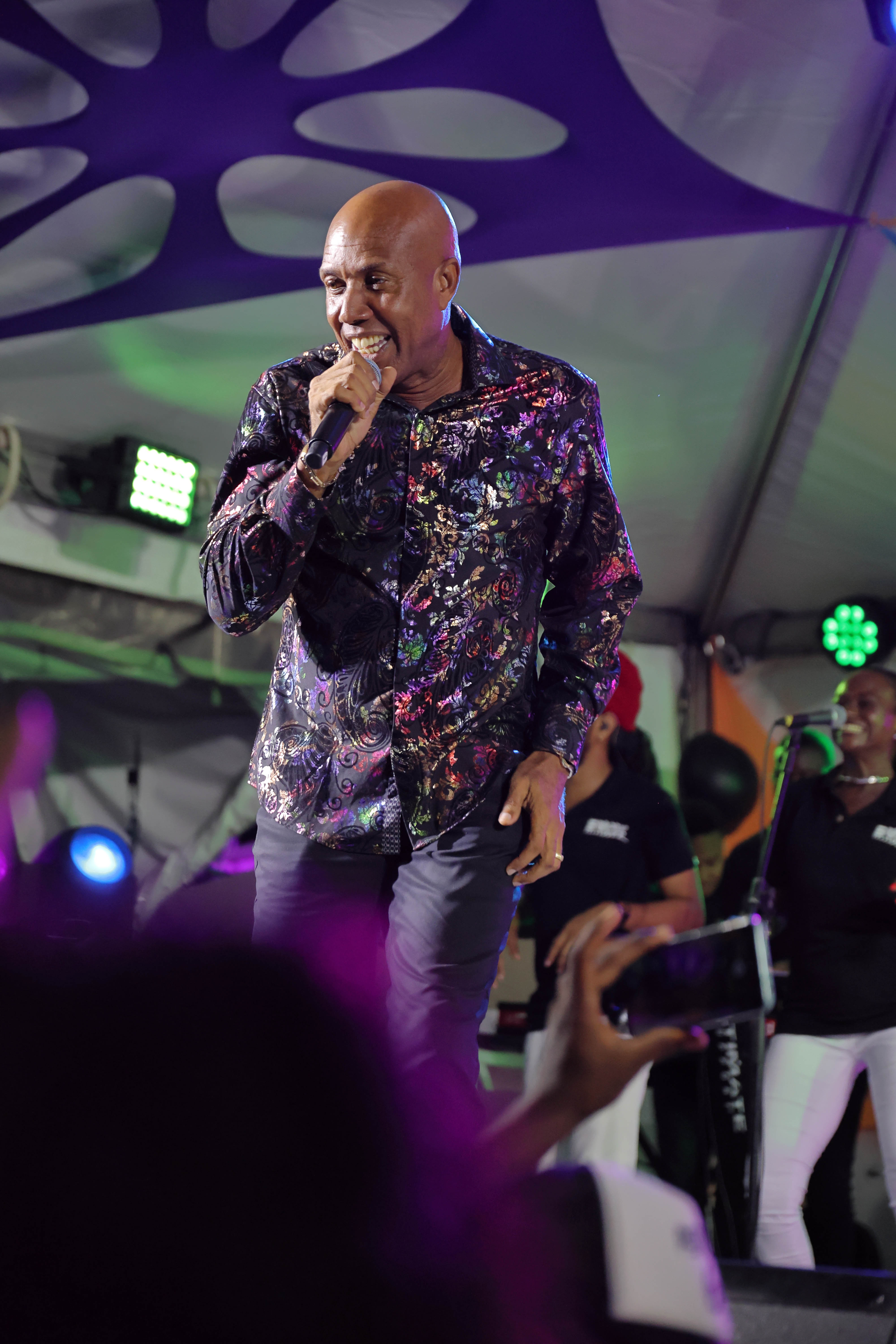
Red Plastic Bag performing at a Crop Over event in Barbados

Red Plastic Bag began performing in 1979. He combined the sounds of reggae and Soca and has become one of the most popular performers in Barbados and throughout the Caribbean. His biggest hit, "Ragga Ragga", (year 1995) has been recorded in seven different languages. His song "Holes" complains about potholes.

As a result of the finals of Barbados' Pic o' de Crop Competition in August 2007, RPB became the island's calypso king for a record eight times, following a two-year hiatus, and pledged to defend his title in 2008, where he came in second to Adrian Clarke, but came back in 2009 to win again.

In 2011 RPB won the title of Sweet Soca Monarch with his song "Once Upon A Wine", a commentary on how Caribbean music and dance has evolved over time.

In 2012, Red Plastic Bag won the Pic-o-de-Crop finals for the 10th time singing "I Thank You Calypso", a tribute to his 30th year in the artform as well as "The Royal Visit".

In January 2015 RPB, along with fellow Barbados and St. Lucia stars Charles D. Lewis, Wayne "Poonka" Willock, Anderson "Blood" Armstrong, Sherwinn "Dupes" Brice, Lennon "Blaze" Prospere and Nicholas Brancker were invited to Berlin, Germany to participate in a cultural exchange project, receiving high accolades from both critics and the general public.
