= Hypasounds =

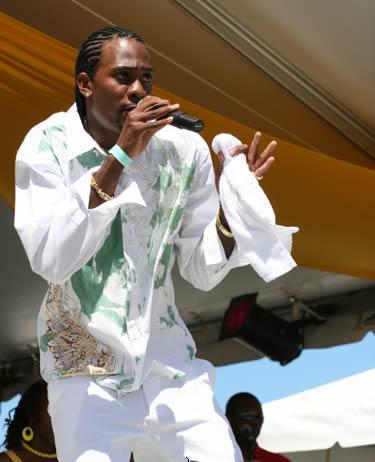

Background information
- Born: Damian Etienne; 5 December 1982 (age 43); Saint Michael, Barbados
- Origin: Barbados
- Genres: Soca
- Occupations: Singer, Producer, Deejay
- Years active: 2006–present
- Website: Hypasounds' Website

Hypasounds (born Damian Etienne, 5 December 1982), is a Barbadian male soca artist based in the Caribbean island of Barbados.

== Career ==
During a brief DJing stint in the United States in late 2003, he and Free, former 106 & Park host on BET introduced the number 8 video. Rapidly building a growing fan base with his reputation for quality turntabling skills, Hypasounds was identified as ‘The Nexx’ in CiRCUIT Magazine, Barbados’ leading youth culture magazine. He has also been featured in Circuit Magazine Seems like CiRCUIT's predictions are coming through. Hypasounds made his first BAJE appearance at 2005 Christmas Night Fete at Kendal Sporting Club. It was a DJ performance that had BAJE patrons buzzing for weeks to come. During Crop-Over 2006, Hypasounds created a stir, not only as a DJ, but as a performer. Hypasounds’ 2006 release Sunshine Girl emerged as a season favourite, burning up the airwaves and was nominated for Best Ragga-Soca Single Male at Barbados Music awards. The ragga-soca track which is dedicated to the fairer sex debuted at the number 4 position on Hott 95.3 FM’s Hott in the Crop charts. It later jumped three positions to capture the top position. Sunshine Girl also broke into the Socaholic Top 20 on 98.1 The One, and ended up taking second place in the People’s Monarch that same year. The popularity of Sunshine Girl outside of Barbados saw Hypasounds performing his hit in New York and Boston. This year, Hypasounds has returned with Sweat, another ragga-soca number which is turning out to be as popular as Sunshine Girl. Sweat’s slow-groove, wine-ya-waist stylings have made the track one of the most requested items for the season. Sweat has broken into the top 3 position on the charts of both Hott 95.3 FM and 98.1 The One. Hypasounds has performed his track at this season’s hypest events and locations, including Soca on the Hill.

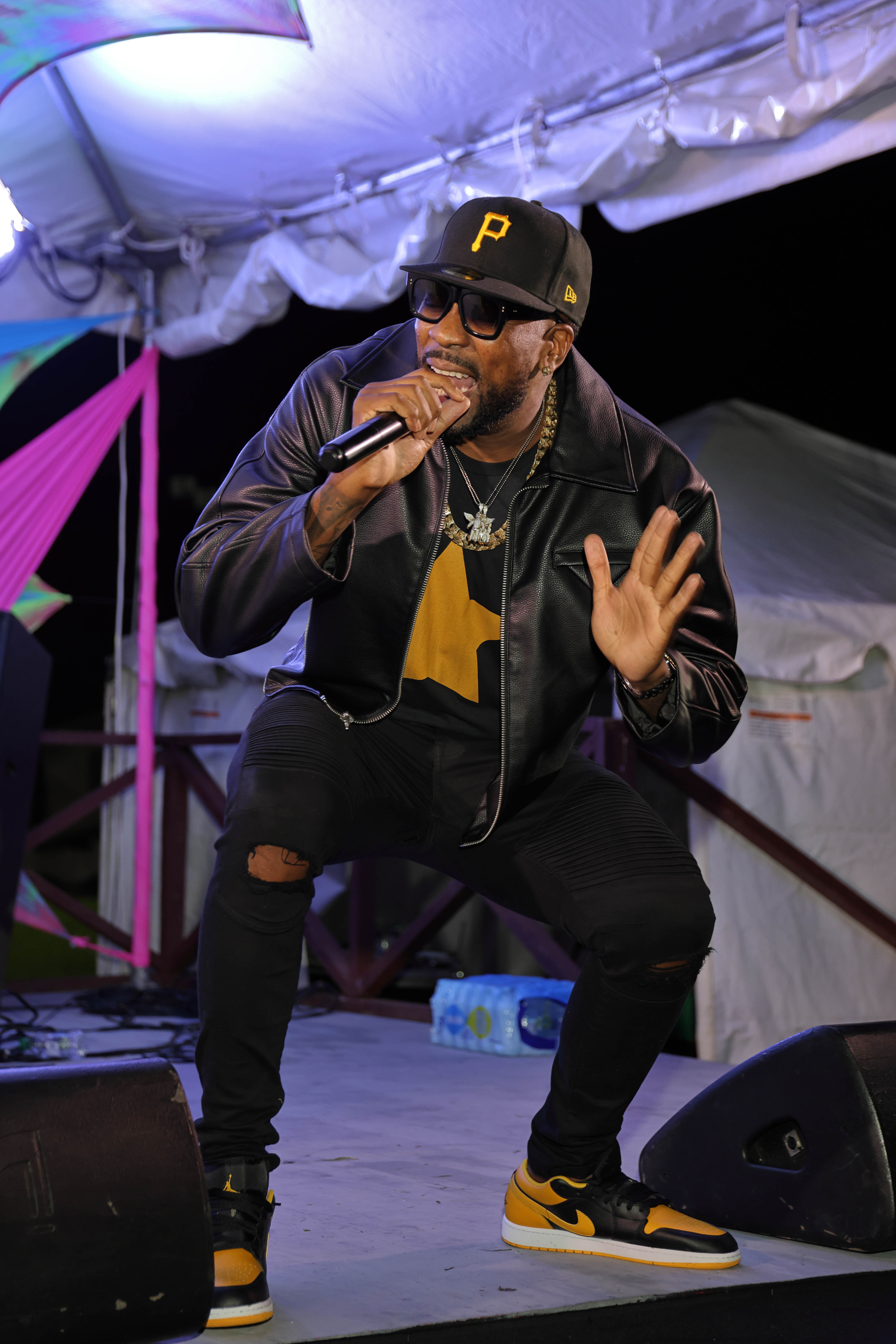
Hypasounds performing at Crop Over in Barbados

== Singles ==
"Sunshine girl"
"Sweat"
"Roll It"
“Dutti”
“How She Like It”
“Sugar Rush”
“Dip”
“Fair Sa”
“Touch”
“One More”

== Awards and nominations ==
- Barbados Music Awards
  - 2007, Best Ragga-Soca Single (Male) [Nominated]

== See also ==
- List of Bajans
