= Oistins Fish Festival =

Annual folk festival in Oistins, Barbados

The Oistins Fish Festival is a folk festival that has taken place in Oistins, Barbados every Easter since 1977. The purpose of the festival is to acknowledge the people involved in the fishing industry.

The name is expected to change in the 2020s, as Toni Thorne, chairman of the festival's organising committee, decided to change the name.

== Overview ==
The festival includes arts and crafts events, along with a greasy pole climbing competition. The food and drinks served include fish, seafood, beer, fish cakes, pudding, and souse.
