= Barbados Jazz Festival =

Former music festival in Barbados

- Genre: Jazz, R&B, pop, soul
- Dates: January
- Location: Barbados
- Coordinates: 13°10′N 59°33′W
- Years active: 1993–2010

The Barbados Jazz Festival was an annual music festival on the Caribbean island of Barbados. It was a week-long celebration held annually in January in Bridgetown.

The festival began in 1993. Acts who performed included James Blunt, Dwane Husbands, Kite, Glenn Lewis, Harvey Mason, Chrisette Michele, and Angie Stone. On 4 December 2010, the producers of the festival announced that it would be cancelled for 2011 due to budgetary constraints.

== See also ==
- List of jazz festivals
