= Crop Over =

Harvest festival in Barbados

- Observed by: Barbados
- Type: Cultural
- Significance: End of annual harvest
- Celebrations: Processions, music, dancing, and the use of masquerade
- Date: First Monday in August; Dates below are for Kadooment
- 2025 date: August 4
- 2026 date: August 3
- 2027 date: August 2
- 2028 date: August 7
- Frequency: Annual
- Related to: Caribbean Carnival, Carnival

Crop Over is a traditional harvest festival which began in Barbados, having had its early beginnings on the sugar cane plantations during slavery.

== History ==
The original crop-over tradition began in 1687 as a way to mark the end of the yearly harvest, but was wide-spread throughout the region at the time, including in St. Vincent, Trinidad and Jamaica. As such, it still shares similarities with Carnival in Brazil and Trinidad. Many crop-over celebrations were organized and sponsored by planters, who used gifts of food and liquor as a means of reenforcing and excusing the continued enslavement of their labour force. However, slaves would also have often unsanctioned fetes that featured singing, dancing and accompaniment by bottles filled with water, shak-shak, banjo, triangle, fiddle, guitar, and bones that were more in keeping with their ancestral culture. Other traditions that were later added included climbing a greased pole, feasting and drinking competitions. However, with the harsh effects of World War II on Barbados, these annual celebrations came to an end. The Crop Over Festival was first launched on June 1, 1970, but was not officially called a festival until four years later.

Crop Over was revived and organized as a national festival in 1974 by local stakeholders including Julian Marryshow, Flora Spencer, Emile Straker, and Livvy Burrowes with the Barbados Tourist Board, as a way to attract more tourists to the island and revive interest in local folk culture. Beginning in June, Crop Over now runs until the first Monday in August when it culminates in the finale, The Grand Kadooment.

== See also ==
- List of plantations in Barbados
- List of harvest festivals

== Further notes ==
- The Crop Over Festival: Barbados' Annual Carnival Celebration, by Baz Dreisinger, About.com
