= Outline of Barbados =

Island nation in the Caribbean

The Flag of Barbados

The Coat of arms of Barbados

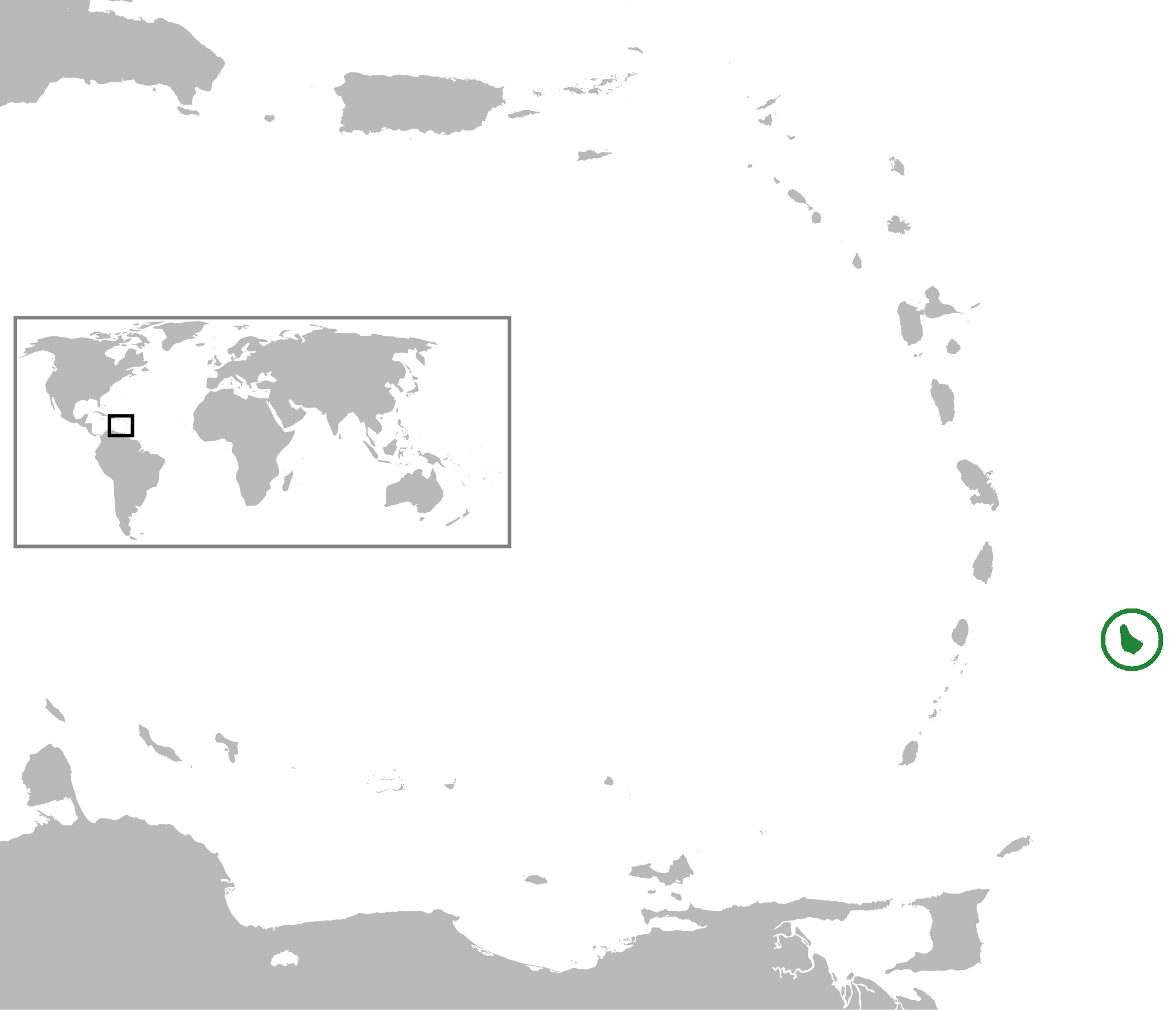
The location of Barbados

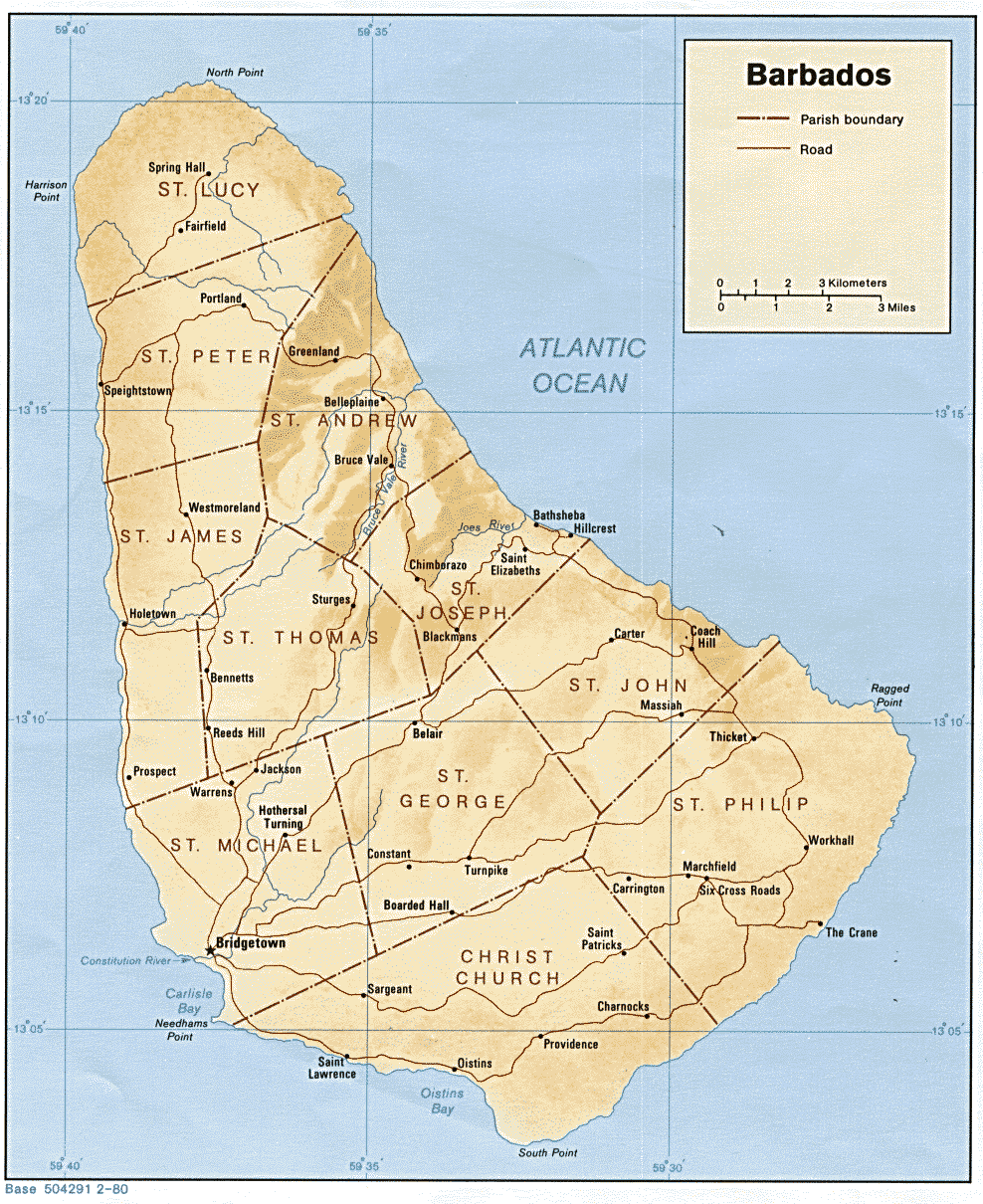
An enlargeable relief map of Barbados

The following outline is provided as an overview of and introduction to Barbados:

Barbados is an island nation in the Caribbean Sea. It is part of the Lesser Antilles of the West Indies and is the southernmost and easternmost island of the Caribbean region. It lies on the boundary of the South American and Caribbean tectonic plates. Its capital and largest city is Bridgetown.

== General reference ==
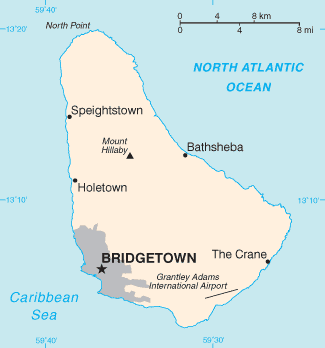
An enlargeable basic map of Barbados

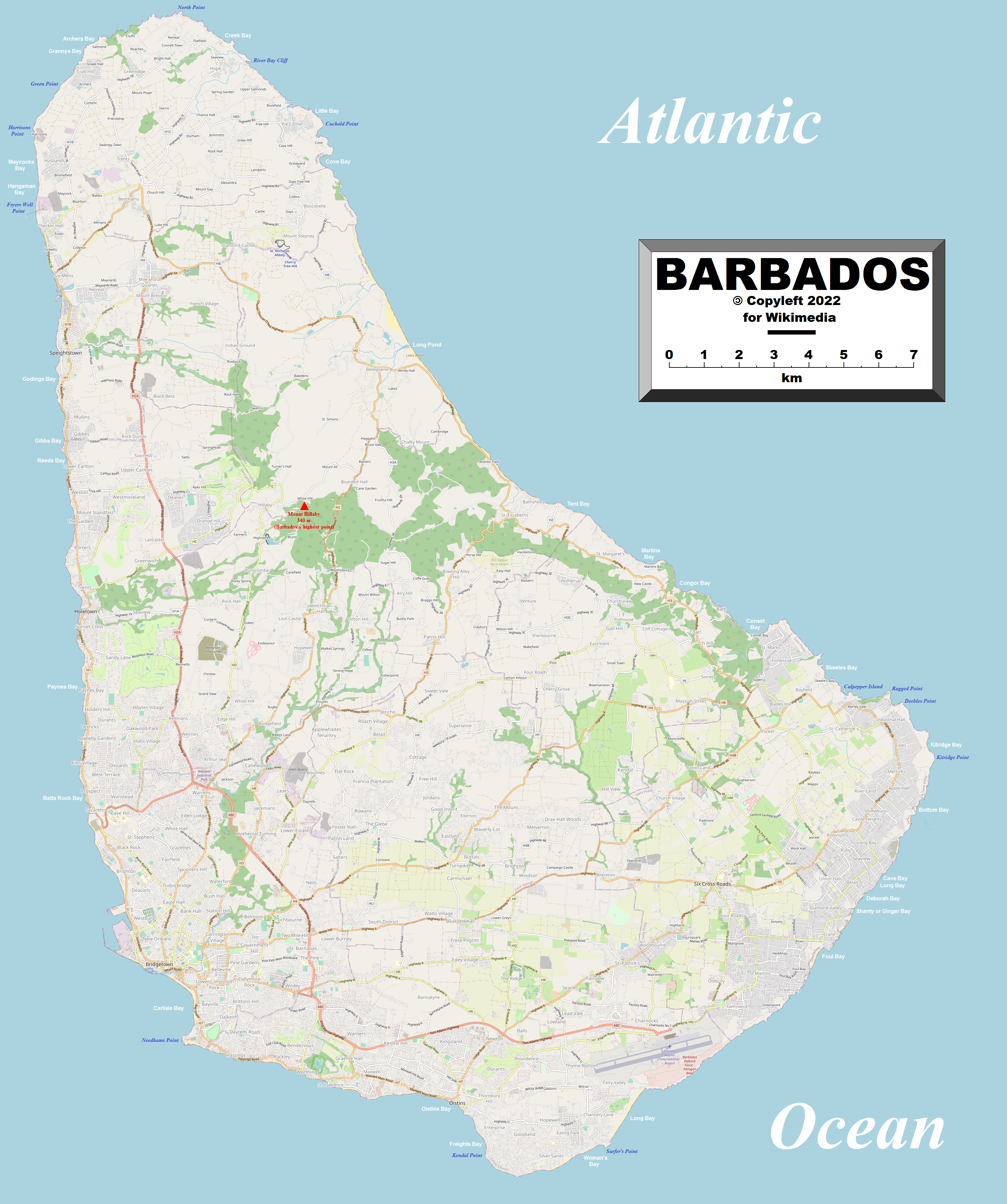
A highly detailed map of Barbados

- Pronunciation:
  - Barbadian English: /bɑːrˈbeɪdoʊz/
  - British English: /bɑːrˈbeɪdɒs/
  - American English: /bɑːrˈbeɪdoʊz/
- Pronunciation:
- Common English country name: Barbados
- Official English country name: Barbados
- Common endonym(s):
- Official endonym(s):
- Adjectival(s): Barbadian
- Demonym(s): Barbadian, Bajan
- Etymology: Name of Barbados
- International rankings of Barbados
- International Telecommunication Union callsign prefix: 8P
- ISO country codes: BB, BRB, 052
- ISO region codes: See ISO 3166-2:BB
- Internet country code top-level domain: .bb

== Geography of Barbados ==
Geography of Barbados

- Barbados is...
  - an island
  - a country
    - an island country
    - a nation state
    - a republic in the Commonwealth of Nations
- Coastline: 97 km
- Population of Barbados: 287,711 - 174th most populous country
- Area of Barbados: 431 square kilometres (166 sq mi) - 199th largest country
- Atlas of Barbados

=== Location of Barbados ===
- Barbados is located within the following regions:
  - Northern Hemisphere and Western Hemisphere
    - North America (though not on the mainland, just north of South America, off the coast of Venezuela)
  - Atlantic Ocean
    - North Atlantic
      - West Indies
        - Antilles
          - Lesser Antilles
  - Time zone: Atlantic Standard Time
- Extreme points of Barbados
  - Northernmost point – North Point, Saint Lucy (N 13.334851, W -59.614742)
  - Southernmost point – South Point, Christ Church (N 13.045294, W -59.526722)
  - Easternmost point – Kitridge Point, Saint Philip (N 13.149207, W -59.420292)
  - Westernmost point – Harrisons, Saint Lucy, Saint Lucy (N 13.305756, W -59.651022)
  - High: Mount Hillaby 336 m (1,102 ft)
  - Low: North Atlantic Ocean 0 m
- Land boundaries: none

=== Environment of Barbados ===
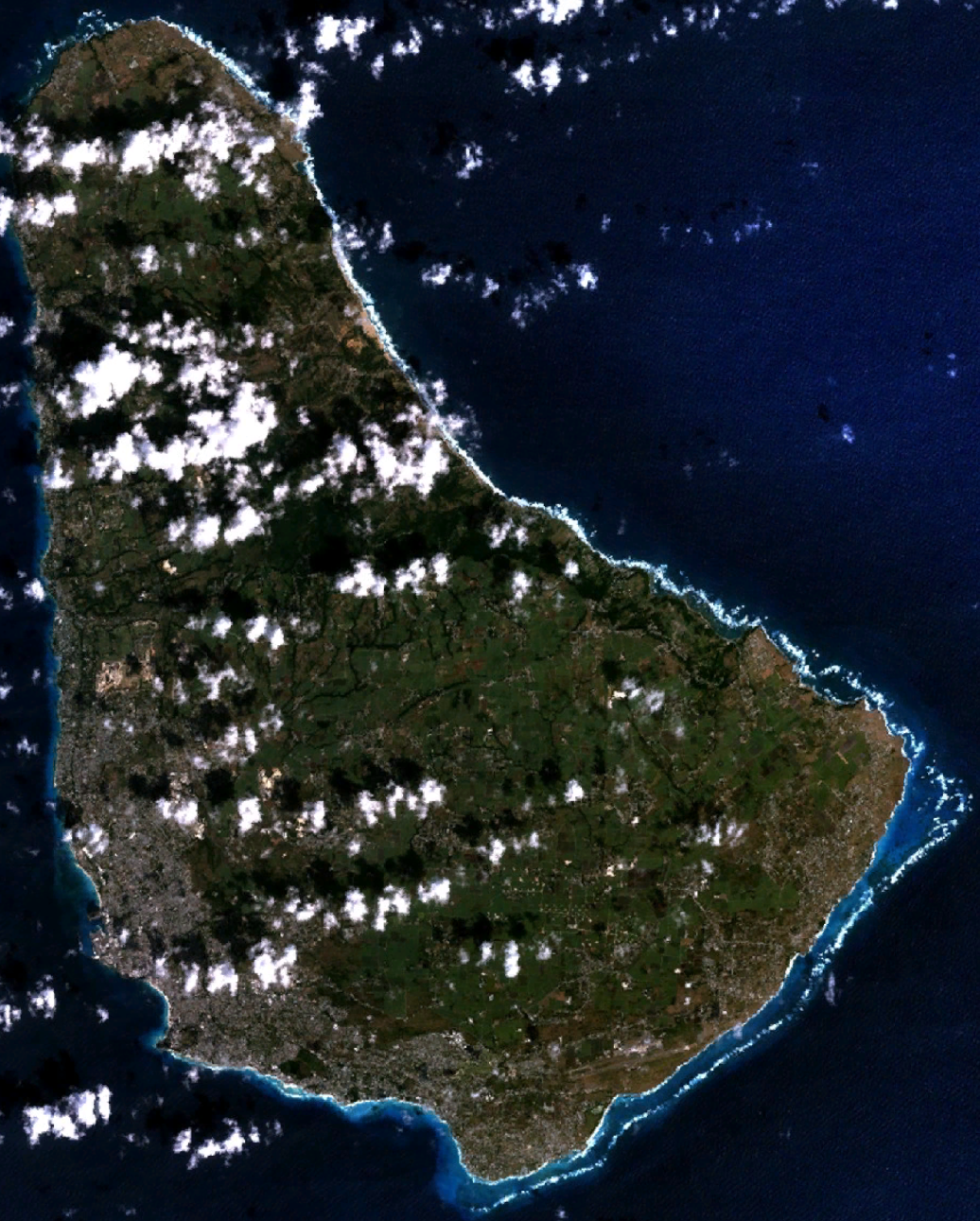
An enlargeable satellite image of Barbados

- Climate of Barbados
  - List of Barbados hurricanes
- Wildlife of Barbados
- Barbados Wildlife Reserve
  - Fauna of Barbados
    - Amphibians and reptiles of Barbados
    - Birds of Barbados
    - Mammals of Barbados

==== Natural geographic features of Barbados ====
- Beaches in Barbados
- Islands of Barbados
- Rivers of Barbados
- World Heritage Sites in Barbados: Bridgetown

=== Regions of Barbados ===
Regions of Barbados

- English place names in Barbados

==== Ecoregions of Barbados ====
List of ecoregions in Barbados

==== Administrative divisions of Barbados ====

- Parishes of Barbados
  - Christ Church
  - Saint Andrew
  - Saint George
  - Saint James
  - Saint John
  - Saint Joseph
  - Saint Lucy
  - Saint Michael
  - Saint Peter
  - Saint Philip
  - Saint Thomas

===== Municipalities of Barbados =====
- Cities, towns and villages in Barbados

=== Demography of Barbados ===
Demographics of Barbados

== Government and politics of Barbados ==
Politics of Barbados

- Form of government: constitutional monarchy and a parliamentary government with strong democratic traditions
- Capital of Barbados: Bridgetown
- Elections in Barbados
- Political parties in Barbados

=== Branches of government ===
Politics of Barbados

==== Executive branch of the government of Barbados ====
Government of Barbados

- Head of state: President of Barbados, Jeffrey Bostic
- Head of government: Prime Minister of Barbados
- Cabinet of Barbados, Mia Mottley
- Ministries and agencies of the Barbados government
  - Ministry of Foreign Affairs, Foreign Trade and International Business (Barbados)

==== Legislative branch of the government of Barbados ====
- Parliament of Barbados (bicameral)
  - Upper house: Senate of Barbados
  - Lower house: Barbados House of Assembly

==== Judicial branch of the government of Barbados ====
Court system of Barbados Judiciary of Barbados

- Caribbean Court of Justice
  - Supreme Court of Barbados

=== Foreign relations of Barbados ===
Foreign relations of Barbados

- Diplomatic missions in Barbados
- Diplomatic missions of Barbados
- Relations with specific countries
  - Australia–Barbados relations
  - Barbados–Brazil relations
  - Barbados–Canada relations
  - Barbados–China relations
  - Barbados–France Maritime Delimitation Agreement
  - Barbados–France relations
  - Barbados–Germany relations
  - Barbados–Grenada relations
  - Barbados–Guyana relations
  - Barbados–India relations
  - Barbados–Japan relations
  - Barbados–Nigeria relations
  - Barbados–Suriname relations
  - Barbados–Trinidad and Tobago relations
  - Barbados–United Kingdom relations
  - Barbados–United States relations
    - Embassy of Barbados in Washington, D.C.

==== International organization membership ====
Barbados is a member of:

- African, Caribbean, and Pacific Group of States (ACP)
- Agency for the Prohibition of Nuclear Weapons in Latin America and the Caribbean (OPANAL)
- Caribbean Community and Common Market (Caricom)
- Caribbean Development Bank (CDB)
- Commonwealth of Nations
- Food and Agriculture Organization (FAO)
- Group of 77 (G77)
- Inter-American Development Bank (IADB)
- International Bank for Reconstruction and Development (IBRD)
- International Civil Aviation Organization (ICAO)
- International Criminal Court (ICCt)
- International Criminal Police Organization (Interpol)
- International Development Association (IDA)
- International Federation of Red Cross and Red Crescent Societies (IFRCS)
- International Finance Corporation (IFC)
- International Fund for Agricultural Development (IFAD)
- International Labour Organization (ILO)
- International Maritime Organization (IMO)
- International Monetary Fund (IMF)
- International Olympic Committee (IOC)
- International Organization for Standardization (ISO)
- International Red Cross and Red Crescent Movement (ICRM)
- International Telecommunication Union (ITU)
- International Telecommunications Satellite Organization (ITSO)
- International Trade Union Confederation (ITUC)
- Latin American Economic System (LAES)
- Multilateral Investment Guarantee Agency (MIGA)
- Nonaligned Movement (NAM)
- Organisation for the Prohibition of Chemical Weapons (OPCW)
- Organization of American States (OAS)
- United Nations (UN)
- United Nations Conference on Trade and Development (UNCTAD)
- United Nations Educational, Scientific, and Cultural Organization (UNESCO)
- United Nations Industrial Development Organization (UNIDO)
- Universal Postal Union (UPU)
- World Customs Organization (WCO)
- World Federation of Trade Unions (WFTU)
- World Health Organization (WHO)
- World Intellectual Property Organization (WIPO)
- World Meteorological Organization (WMO)
- World Trade Organization (WTO)

=== Law and order in Barbados ===
Law of Barbados

- Constitution of Barbados
- Crime in Barbados
  - Human trafficking in Barbados
- Human rights in Barbados
  - LGBT rights in Barbados
- Law enforcement in Barbados

=== Military of Barbados ===
Military of Barbados

- Command
  - Commander-in-chief
- Barbados Defence Force
  - Barbados Coast Guard
  - Army of Barbados
  - Navy of Barbados
- Military history of Barbados
- Military ranks of Barbados
- Project HARP

=== Local government in Barbados ===
Local government in Barbados

- Constituency Councils

== History of Barbados ==
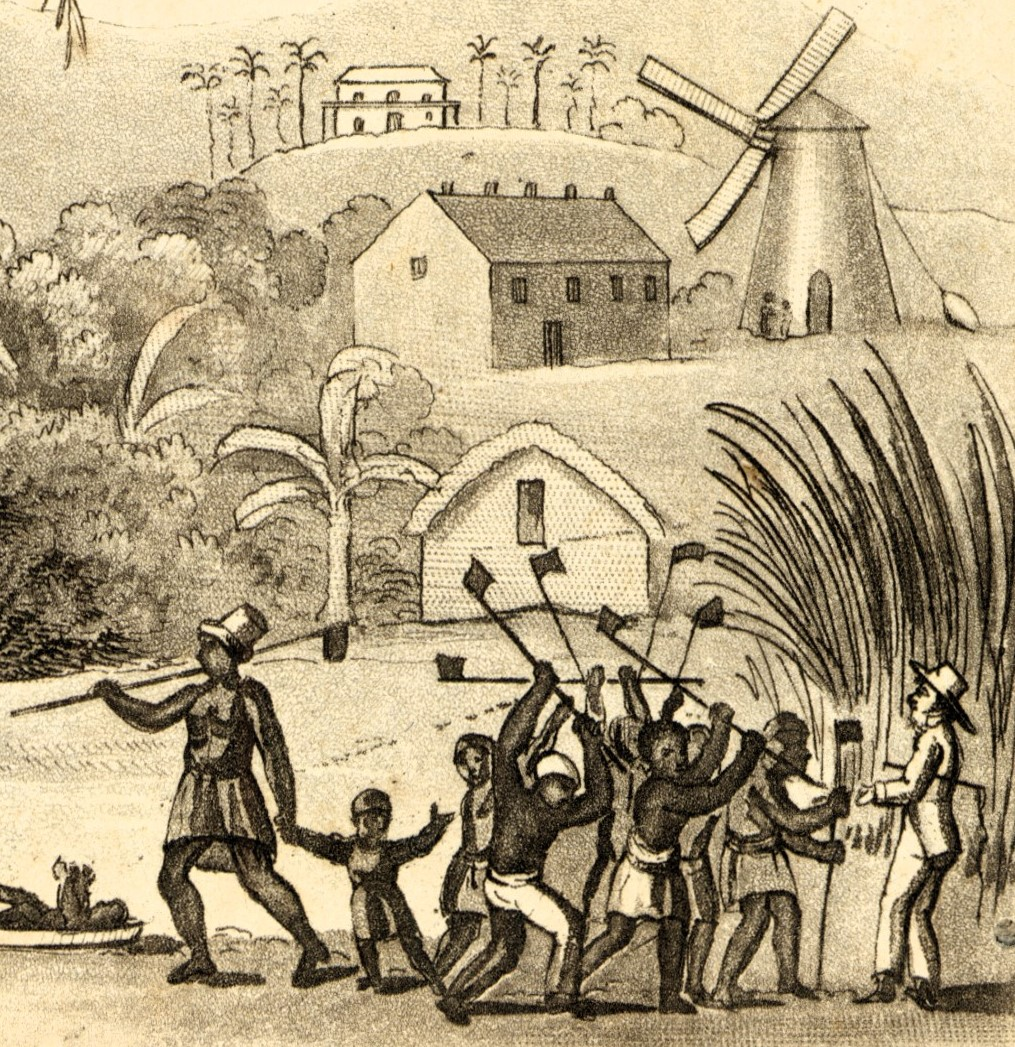
African Slaves working in a sugar plantation in Barbados, 1807-1808

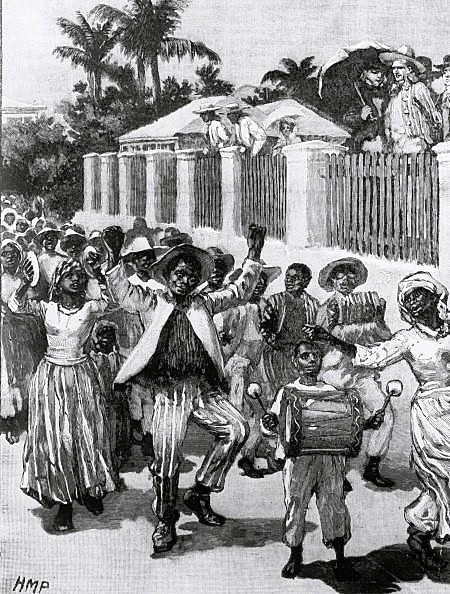
Slaves Barbados march through the streets to celebrate their emancipation

History of Barbados

- Timeline of Barbadian history
- Current events of Barbados
- Military history of Barbados

== Culture of Barbados ==
Culture of Barbados

- Barbados Lottery
- Cuisine of Barbados
- Languages of Barbados
  - English in Barbados
    - English place names in Barbados
- Media in Barbados
  - Newspapers in Barbados
  - Radio stations in Barbados
  - Television in Barbados
- National symbols of Barbados
  - Coat of arms of Barbados
  - Flag of Barbados
  - National anthem of Barbados
- People of Barbados
- Public holidays in Barbados
- Religion in Barbados
  - Anglican Church of Barbados
  - Hinduism in Barbados
  - Islam in Barbados
    - History of the Jews in Barbados
- Scouting and Guiding in Barbados
  - Barbados Boy Scouts Association
  - The Girl Guides Association of Barbados
- World Heritage Sites in Barbados:
  - Bridgetown
  - George Washington House (Barbados)
  - Morgan Lewis Windmill
  - Nidhe Israel Synagogue

=== Arts and entertainment in Barbados ===
- Beauty pageants in Barbados
  - Miss Barbados Universe
  - Miss Barbados World

==== Art in Barbados ====
- Music of Barbados
  - Music history of Barbados
  - Barbados Chamber Orchestra
  - Barbados Jazz Festival
  - Royal Barbados Police Band

==== Sports in Barbados ====
Sports in Barbados

- Cricket in Barbados
  - Barbados Cricket Association
  - Barbados Cricket Buckle
  - Barbados national cricket team
- Cycling in Barbados
  - Barbados Cycling Union
- Football in Barbados
  - Barbados Football Association
  - Barbados national football team
  - Barbados national football team results
- Netball in Barbados
  - Barbados national netball team
- Rugby in Barbados
  - Barbados national rugby union team
- Volleyball in Barbados
  - Barbados men's national volleyball team
- Barbados at international sports competitions
  - Barbados at the Commonwealth Games
    - Barbados at the 2006 Commonwealth Games
    - Barbados at the 2010 Commonwealth Games
  - Barbados at the Pan American Games
    - Barbados at the 1991 Pan American Games
    - Barbados at the 1995 Pan American Games
    - Barbados at the 1999 Pan American Games
    - Barbados at the 2003 Pan American Games
    - Barbados at the 2007 Pan American Games
    - Barbados at the 2011 Pan American Games
  - Barbados at the Paralympics
    - Barbados at the 2000 Summer Paralympics
    - Barbados at the 2008 Summer Paralympics
  - Barbados at the Olympics
    - Barbados at the 1968 Summer Olympics
    - Barbados at the 1972 Summer Olympics
    - Barbados at the 1976 Summer Olympics
    - Barbados at the 1984 Summer Olympics
    - Barbados at the 1988 Summer Olympics
    - Barbados at the 1992 Summer Olympics
    - Barbados at the 1996 Summer Olympics
    - Barbados at the 2000 Summer Olympics
    - Barbados at the 2004 Summer Olympics
    - Barbados at the 2008 Summer Olympics
    - Barbados at the 2012 Summer Olympics
  - Other international sports competitions
    - Barbados at the 2009 World Championships in Athletics
    - Barbados at the 2010 Central American and Caribbean Games
    - Barbados at the 2010 Summer Youth Olympics
    - Barbados at the 2011 World Aquatics Championships
    - Barbados at the 2011 World Championships in Athletics
- Other
  - Barbados Davis Cup team
  - Barbados FA Cup
  - Barbados Fed Cup team
  - Barbados First Division
  - Barbados Gold Cup
  - Barbados National Stadium
  - 2010 Barbados Premier Division
  - 2011 Barbados Premier Division
  - Association football in Barbados
  - Barbados Olympic Association
  - Barbados Premier Division
  - Barbados women's national football team
  - Barbados women's national rugby union team
  - Barbados women's national volleyball team
  - Carlton Cricket Club (Barbados)
  - List of football clubs in Barbados
  - List of international cricketers from Barbados
  - Rugby union in Barbados
  - Technico (Barbados football club)

== Economy and infrastructure of Barbados ==
Economy of Barbados

- Economic rank, by nominal GDP (2007): 144th (one hundred and forty fourth)
- Banking in Barbados
  - Central Bank of Barbados
- Communications in Barbados
  - Internet in Barbados
- Companies of Barbados
- Currency of Barbados: Dollar
  - ISO 4217: BBD
- Barbados Stock Exchange
  - List of companies listed on the Barbados Stock Exchange
- Tourism in Barbados
  - Visa policy of Barbados
- Transport in Barbados
  - Air transport in Barbados
    - Airlines of Barbados
    - Airports in Barbados
  - Port of Bridgetown

== Education in Barbados ==
Education in Barbados

- Schools in Barbados
- Universities and colleges in Barbados

== Health in Barbados ==
- Hospitals in Barbados

== See also ==
Barbados

- Index of Barbados-related articles
- List of Barbados-related topics
- List of international rankings
- Member state of the Commonwealth of Nations
- Member state of the United Nations
- Outline of geography
- Outline of North America
- Monarchy of Barbados
- 1831 Barbados hurricane
- Amateur radio call signs of Barbados
- Bahá'í Faith in Barbados
- Banks Barbados Brewery
- Barbados (band)
- Barbados (composition)
- Barbados (Typically Tropical song)
- Barbados and CARICOM
- Barbados anole
- Barbados Association for Children With Intellectual Challenges
- Barbados Blackbelly sheep
- Barbados bullfinch
- Barbados Civil Aviation Department
- Barbados Defence Force Sports Program
- Barbados Independence Act 1966
- Barbados Joe Walcott
- Barbados leaf-toed gecko
- Barbados Light and Power Company
- Barbados lottery
- Barbados Museum & Historical Society
- Barbados National Archives
- Barbados National Oil Company Limited
- Barbados National Pledge
- Barbados National Trust
- Barbados nationality law
- Barbados passport
- Barbados Police Headquarters
- Barbados Port Incorporated
- Barbados Programme of Action
- Barbados raccoon
- Barbados racer
- Barbados rail
- Barbados Red Cross Society
- Barbados Regiment
- Barbados Sky
- Barbados Slave Code
- Barbados Stock Exchange
- Barbados threadsnake
- Barbados Transport Board
- Barbados Triple Crown of Thoroughbred Racing
- Barbados v. Trinidad and Tobago
- Barbados Water Authority
- Barbados Wildlife Reserve
- Barbados Workers' Union
- Battle off Barbados
- Bishop of Barbados
- CBC Radio (Barbados)
- CBC TV 8 (Barbados)
- Codrington School (Barbados)
- Congress of Trade Unions and Staff Associations of Barbados
- David Bentley (Bishop of Barbados)
- DGM Barbados Open
- Douglas Lynch (Barbados)
- Freemasonry in Barbados
- George Washington House (Barbados)
- Governor-General of Barbados
- Harrison College (Barbados)
- High Commission of Barbados, Ottawa
- Immigration to Barbados
- Index of Barbados-related articles
- Indian River (Barbados)
- Indians in Barbados
- Industrial heritage of Barbados
- Institute of Chartered Accountants of Barbados
- Knight or Dame of St. Andrew (Barbados)
- Landship (Barbados)
- List of governors of Barbados
- List of high commissioners of the United Kingdom to Barbados
- List of plantations in Barbados
- List of speakers of the House of Assembly of Barbados
- Long Pond River (Barbados)
- Mártires de Barbados Stadium
- Multi-Choice TV (Barbados)
- Music history of Barbados
- National Library Service of Barbados
- Order of Barbados
- Parkinson Memorial Secondary School (Barbados)
- Pelican Island (Barbados)
- Quality FM (Barbados)
- Queen's College (Barbados)
- Royal Barbados Police Band
- Sheraton Centre (Barbados)
- Sherbrooke (Barbados)
- Shipping Association of Barbados
- Silver Sands (Barbados football club)
- Table of precedence for Barbados
- The Barbados Advocate
- The Daily Nation (Barbados)
- The One 98.1 FM (Barbados)
- The Ursuline Convent (Barbados)
- To Hell or Barbados
- Voice of Barbados
- William Douglas (Barbados)
- Republicanism in Barbados
- List of prime ministers of Barbados
- Senate of Barbados
- Members of the Senate of Barbados
- House of Assembly of Barbados
- List of presidents of the Legislative Council of Barbados
- List of presidents of the Senate of Barbados
- Supreme Court of Judicature (Barbados)
- United States Ambassador to Barbados
- United States Ambassador to Barbados and the Eastern Caribbean
- Royal Barbados Police Force
- Postage stamps and postal history of Barbados
- Postal codes in Barbados
- Telecommunications in Barbados
- TeleBarbados
- Highways in Barbados
- Vehicle registration plates of Barbados
