= Sheraton Centre =

Sheraton Centre may refer to:

- Le Centre Sheraton Montreal Hotel
- Sheraton Centre Toronto Hotel
- Sheraton Centre (Barbados)
- Sheraton New York Times Square Hotel, formerly known as Sheraton Centre Hotel & Towers
