= Sheraton =

Sheraton may refer to:

- Sheraton Hotels and Resorts, a hotel chain
- Sheraton, County Durham, a village in County Durham, in England
- Sheraton Centre (Barbados), a mall complex located in the parish of Christ Church, Barbados
- Sheraton style, an 18th-century neoclassical furniture style, so called after Thomas Sheraton
- Epiphone Sheraton, a guitar manufactured by Gibson's Epiphone division

== People ==
- Mimi Sheraton (1926–2023), American food critic
- Thomas Sheraton (1751–1806), English furniture designer
