= Human trafficking in Barbados =

Barbados is a source and destination country for men, women, and children subjected to trafficking in persons, specifically forced prostitution and forced labor. Some children in Barbados were subjected to commercial sexual exploitation in “transactional sex” wherein a third party such as a parent received a benefit from the child's participation in sexual activity. Researchers identified patterns of transactional sex within families, most often by adult male caretakers such as step-fathers, as well as child prostitution outside the home. Women from the Dominican Republic, Guyana, and Jamaica voluntarily entered Barbados as illegal migrants, and some expected to engage in prostitution. Some of these women were exploited in forced prostitution subsequent to their arrival. Some other foreign women who entered the country illegally were exploited in involuntary domestic servitude in private homes. Foreign men have been transported to Barbados for the purpose of labor exploitation in construction and other sectors. Sex traffickers, primarily organized criminals from Guyana, formed partnerships with pimps and brothel owners from Trinidad and Tobago and Barbados, and lured women to Barbados with offers of legitimate work. Trafficking victims tend to enter the country through legal means, usually by air; traffickers later used force and coercion to obtain and maintained the victims' work in strip clubs, massage parlors, some private residences, and “entertainment clubs” which operate as brothels. Traffickers used methods such as threats of physical harm or deportation, debt bondage, false contracts, psychological abuse, and confinement to force victims to work in construction, the garment industry, agriculture, or private households.

== History ==
In 2010 the Government of Barbados did not fully comply with the minimum standards for the elimination of trafficking; however, it made significant efforts to do so. Despite these efforts, particularly an aggressive public campaign begun by government ministries and the continued drafting of a comprehensive anti-trafficking law, the government's overall efforts did not improve over the reporting period. Law enforcement and immigration officials continued to summarily deport undocumented foreigners without determining whether they are trafficking victims; the government opened no investigations into possible cases of sex or labor trafficking; and it did not prosecute any trafficking cases during the year.

Barbados ratified the 2000 UN TIP Protocol in November 2014.

The U.S. State Department's Office to Monitor and Combat Trafficking in Persons placed the country in "Tier 2" in 2017 and 2023.

In 2023, the Organised Crime Index gave the country a score of 4 out of 10 for human trafficking, noting the low level of prosecutions for this crime.

== Prosecution ==
The Barbadian government made no discernible progress in its anti-human trafficking law enforcement efforts during the year 2010. Law enforcement agencies faced resource constraints and competing priorities. No trafficking offenders were prosecuted during the year. No cases were brought against employers for confiscating passports or travel documents. Barbados has no specific law prohibiting human trafficking, but slavery and forced labor are constitutionally prohibited. Existing statutes such as the Sexual Offences Act of 1992, Cap. 154 and the Offences Against the Person Act of 1994, Cap. 141 prohibit some trafficking offenses, as well as trafficking-related offenses, though these were not used to prosecute and convict trafficking offenders during the year. Sections 33 and 34 of the Offences Against the Person Act prohibit the crime of slavery; penalties for this offense range from five to fifteen years' imprisonment and are sufficiently stringent. There were no reports of government officials' complicity in human trafficking.

== Protection ==
The Government of Barbados maintained its moderate efforts to ensure victims' access to necessary protective services in 2010. As the crime of trafficking does not officially exist in Barbadian law, there are no legal protections provided for trafficking victims. Existing facilities which provide assistance to victims of other crimes, such as rape and child abuse, that are partially funded by the government and run by NGOs, may have provided services to child victims of sex trafficking without having identified them as human trafficking victims. Neither government nor NGO personnel could provide information about whether any trafficking victims were identified at these facilities. The Gender Affairs Bureau arranged for assistance to be provided to victims of any crime regardless of whether they participated in investigations or prosecutions. Officials from this Bureau collaborated with a local NGO to sensitize government agencies on the difference between smuggling and trafficking, the importance of referring victims to services provided in collaboration with NGOs, and the importance of implementing a trafficking-specific protocol and legislation to better target their efforts. Victims of trafficking (like victims of other crimes) were not usually encouraged to participate in investigations or prosecutions of trafficking offenders. Trafficking victims could be prosecuted for unlawful acts committed as a direct result of their being trafficked. Most law enforcement and immigration officials still do not have the appropriate training, funding, and other necessary mechanisms to identify victims or suspected cases of trafficking. The government provided no legal alternatives for the removal of foreign trafficking victims to countries where they may face hardship or retribution. Police claimed to have no option under current laws but to treat foreign trafficking victims without valid immigration documents as violators of the law subject to summary deportation. There have been no reported cases of Barbadians trafficked to foreign countries, although the Bureau of Gender Affairs has specialized services in place should such a case arise.

In 2016 Barbados passed the Trafficking in Persons Prevention Act, 2016. This Act repealed and replaced Transnational Organizational Crime (Prevention and Control) Act, 2011, which provided for prosecution of all forms of human trafficking including the removal of human organs. The Trafficking in Persons Prevention Act, 2016 gives effect to the United Nations Protocol to Prevent, Suppress and Punish Trafficking in Persons, Especially Women and Children, Supplementing, the United Nations Convention Against Transnational Organized Crime. Section 3 of this 2016 Act provides for the offence of trafficking in persons and the penalty is a fine of one million dollars, 25 years in prison or both the fine and imprisonment. Section 4 provides for the offence of trafficking in children and the penalty is two million dollars or life imprisonment or both. Section 6 makes it an offence to hold or keep a person's travel documents and the penalty for this offence is $250 000, 20 years in prison or both. Section 7 makes it an offence to transport or conspire to transport a person for the purpose of exploiting that person for prostitution. Section 8 and 9 make it offence to receive financial benefit from trafficking in persons or children respectively. Section 10 provides for the forfeiture of the proceeds of trafficking. Section 12 provides for the Directors or agent of the company to be liable for trafficking depending on the proven level of the companies involvement. Section 11 provides for restitution to victims in the way of loss of income, compensation for their distress and for medical expenses to name a few areas. Section 20 provides for victims to be given a safe haven when found and to be safe passage to their home country or country of their choice. These provisions are in keeping with the required international standards.

== Prevention ==
The government made weak efforts to prevent human trafficking and raise the public's awareness of the risks and dangers of human trafficking in Barbados. In 2004, the government began work on a protocol for anti-trafficking action, which the Gender Affairs Bureau passed to other government agencies for comment in early 2009. The protocol was expected to be introduced in Parliament in April 2010. The Minister of Youth, Family, and Sports spoke openly against child prostitution on several occasions, a subject which had not often been raised in public before. During the year, the government continued to host educational workshops for an unspecified number of officials and social service providers. There was no formal mechanism for coordinating government and NGO action on trafficking issues, but the Bureau of Gender Affairs worked with regional and local NGOs, religious organizations, and community advocates to better organize their anti-trafficking efforts and outreach. Although public commentary on the problem of sex tourism, including child sex tourism, has been increasing, the government has made no noticeable efforts to reduce the demand for commercial sex acts. Barbados is not a party to the 2000 UN TIP Protocol. In October 2020, from the 19 until the 22, the U.S. Embassy to Barbados held a training course on fraud prevention and detection. It was attended by members of the Royal Barbados Police Force, the Customs Department, the Immigration Department, as well as the Barbados Defense Force. The course included training on responding to human trafficking, identification of fraudulent documents, interviewing techniques, and the detection of imposters. These courses were facilitated by the U.S. Diplomatic Security Service Overseas Criminal Investigation Unit. In a statement from the Ambassador Taglialatela on 11 January 2021, the U.S. National Human Trafficking Awareness Day, he stated that the Barbados have seen one of the most challenging years in history, due to the COVID-19 pandemic which impacted the economy and has caused serious public health challenges. Due to the pandemic the issues caused by the economic insecurities has made more people vulnerable to human trafficking. In working together with the U.S. Agency for International Development (USAID), improved technologies supporting the Royal Barbados Police Force's law enforcement could be implemented.
