= Barbados–United States relations =

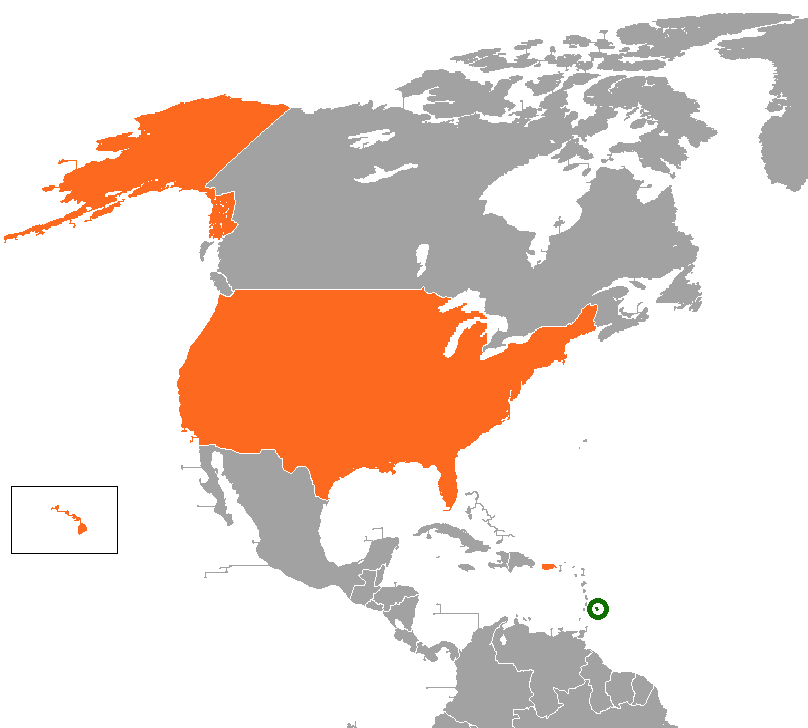

- Barbados: United States

Diplomatic mission
- Embassy of Barbados, Washington, DC: Embassy of the United States, Bridgetown

Envoy
- Ambassador Victor Fernandes: Ambassador Karin B. Sullivan

The United States and Barbados have had cordial bilateral relations since Barbados' independence in 1966. The United States has supported the government's efforts to expand the country's economic base and to provide a higher standard of living for its citizens. Barbados is a beneficiary of the U.S. Caribbean Basin Initiative. U.S. assistance is channeled primarily through multilateral agencies such as the Inter-American Development Bank and the World Bank, as well as the U.S. Agency for International Development (USAID) office in Bridgetown.

== History ==
In the early 17th century Barbadians began large-scale migration from Barbados to the areas of North and South Carolina, becoming among some of the first resident settlers in those states.

The first English settlement in South Carolina was made in 1670, when three shiploads of emigrants from Barbados sailed up the Ashley River. The first ship to land was the Carolina, in April 1670. It was followed shortly by the Port Royal and the Three Brothers. These three ships left Barbados with 150 people on board; two died en route. The settlers pitched their tents on its banks and built a town, which has since wholly disappeared. Ten years later, a more favorable site for the town, between the Cooper and Ashley Rivers, was chosen. This is where Charles Town was founded in 1680, where it remains today with the slightly altered name Charleston. Since the Barbadians had been in the "plantation" business for decades, they brought this concept and its associated culture to Charles Town in the 1670s.

In 1751, George Washington visited Barbados. He stayed at what is now George Washington House (Barbados).

The U.S. Government has been represented on Barbados since 1923.

In 1993–94 Barbados was considering joining the North American Free Trade Agreement (NAFTA). However, by 1996, this bid was put off in favour of the seeking admission to the Free Trade Area of the Americas (FTAA).

In May 1997, Barbadian Prime Minister Owen Arthur hosted U.S. President Bill Clinton and 14 other Caribbean leaders during the first-ever U.S.-regional summit in Bridgetown, Barbados. The summit strengthened the basis for regional cooperation on justice and counter narcotics issues, finance and development, and trade.

Barbados receives counter-narcotics assistance and is eligible to benefit from the U.S. military's exercise-related and humanitarian assistance construction program.

The U.S.-based telecommunications company Liberty Latin America (d/b/a Cable and Wireless), is the incumbent telephone service provider for the entire country of Barbados.

== Mission ==
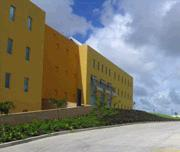
United States Embassy in Wildey, Saint Michael, Barbados

The first embassy for the United States to Barbados was located at the former Canadian Imperial Bank of Commerce Building on Broad Street. Later, this was transformed from a consulate to an embassy in 1966. After outgrowing the available space on Broad Street, the embassy began searching for a new home. In 1997, the diplomatic mission sought a purpose-built location in Wildey and in 2003, construction of the new U.S. Embassy designed by Sorg Architects began. On January 11, 2007, the embassy moved from three old locations into the one new facility. The current mission houses eight US government agencies, working in 24 countries and territories across the region.

== Bilateral relations ==
Barbados and U.S. authorities cooperate closely in the fight against narcotics trafficking and other forms of transnational crime. In 1996, the United States and Barbados signed a mutual legal assistance treaty (MLAT) and an updated extradition treaty covering all common offenses, including conspiracy and organized crime. A maritime law enforcement agreement was signed in 1997.

A popular tourist destination, Barbados had around 570,000 tourists in 2006, mainly cruise ship visitors. The majority of tourists are from the United Kingdom, Germany, the Caribbean, and the United States. An estimated 3,000 Americans reside in the country.

In 2011 Barbados was added to a US work visa list.

== Diplomatic missions ==
- The U.S. Embassy and F.B.I. legal attaché office to Barbados and the Eastern Caribbean region is located in Wildey, St. Michael.
- The Barbadian Embassy to the United States is located in Washington, D.C. Barbados additionally maintains two Consulates-General located in Miami and New York City.

== Diplomatic visits ==
- List of international trips made by presidents of the United States
- List of diplomatic visits to the United States: North America and the Caribbean#Barbados, Prime ministers of Barbados to the USA

== See also ==
- Barbadian American
- North American Union
- Third Border Initiative
- Caribbean Community
- Caribbean Basin Initiative (CBI)
- Partnership for Prosperity and Security in the Caribbean ("The Bridgetown Accord")
- Caribbean Basin Trade Partnership Act
- Western Hemisphere Travel Initiative
- Foreign relations of the United States
- Foreign relations of Barbados
