= Districts of Barbados =

In 1959 the country of Barbados was changed from the vestry system, into a more modern system of local government patterned after that of the United Kingdom. Two main sub-regions known as districts were formed in Barbados, and the majority of the vestry parish councils, which acted as local government, were consolidated and transferred into these larger areas and also the Bridgetown City Council. Both were simply known as the Northern and Southern districts, and a third separate area consisted of the City of Bridgetown. Each of these districts were run by chairmen, and the city with a mayor affiliated with Barbados' political parties.

== Northern District ==
The Northern District contained all parishes northwards of the parishes of Saint Michael, Saint George and Saint John. This included:

- Saint Andrew
- Saint James
- Saint Joseph
- Saint Lucy
- Saint Peter
- Saint Thomas

== Southern District ==
The Southern District contained all parishes to the south and east of Saint Michael, this included:

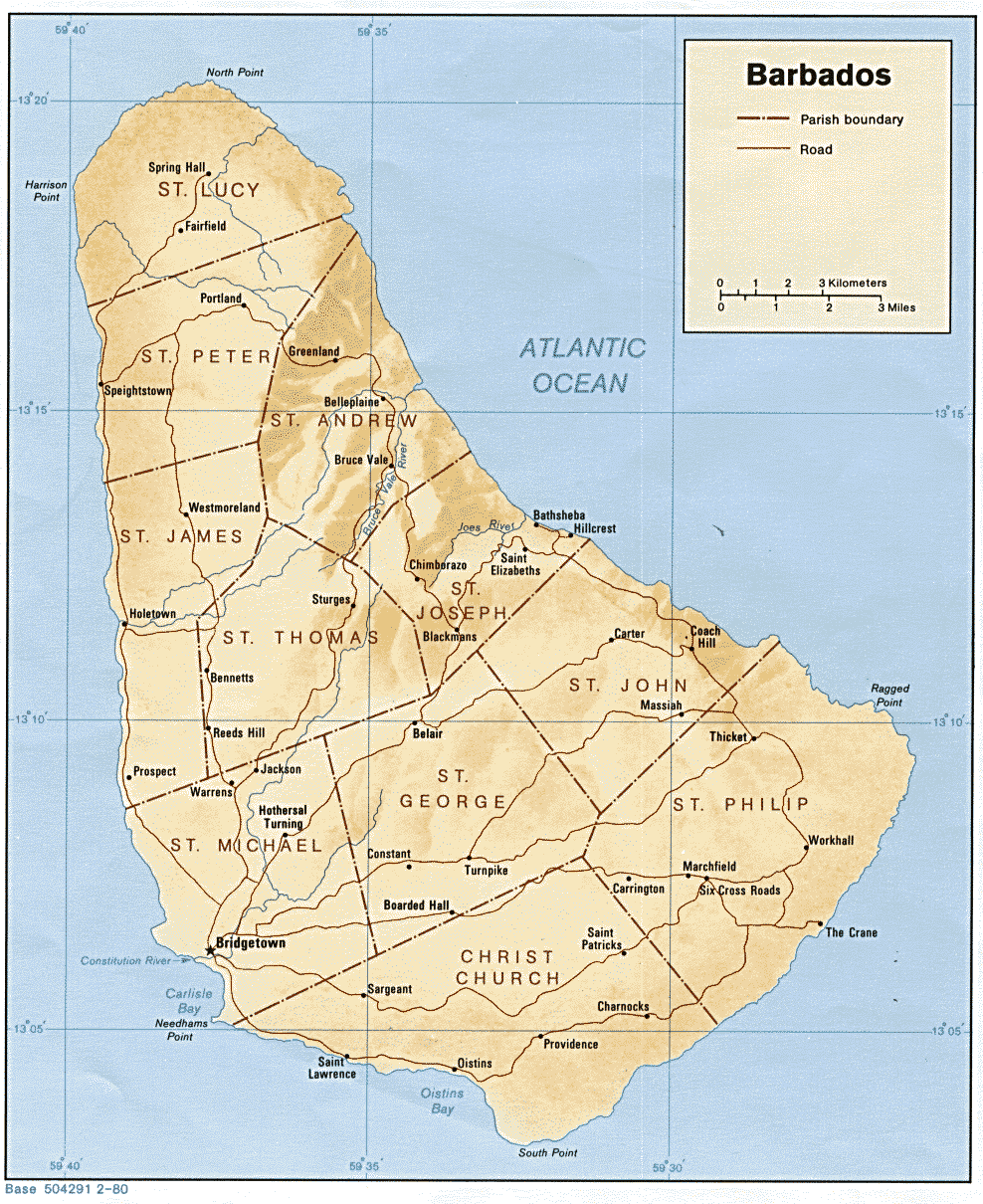
Map of Barbados

- Christ Church
- Saint George
- Saint John
- Saint Philip

== City of Bridgetown ==
Besides the two districts, the greater Bridgetown area was devised into three city wards. These were known simply as:

- The City Ward
- The Carlisle Ward
- The Saint Michael Ward

=== Mayors ===
Mayors of Bridgetown included:

- Ernest Deighton ("E.D.") Mottley, Esq.
- Louis Lynch

== Local government ==
- The North and South districts each had their own council. These councils were maintained by a chairman and was further supported by aldermen and councillors.
- The City of Bridgetown as outlined in the Local Government Act, (1958); was governed by a mayor, a deputy mayor, six aldermen (senior councillors), and twelve city councillors (four councillors went to each of the three wards.)

== Disestablishment ==
In between 1967 and 1969, the process of local government was phased out. At this time all local matters became transferred to the national level, to the interim commissioner of local government. The district councils and mayors were removed and constituents in each parish from then on depended on their parliamentary representative or national government corporation, department, or statutory agencies to carry out the provision of services across Barbados' eleven parishes.

== Legacy ==
Although the districts have been abolished, the operational structure of the Royal Barbados Police Force still follows closely to the district system that was once in Barbados.

Within the police force:

- Saint Michael is covered by District A,
- Both Christ Church and Saint George are covered by District B,
- Both Saint Philip and Saint John are covered by District C,
- Saint Thomas is covered by District D,
- Saint Peter is covered by District E,
- Saint Joseph is covered by District F.

There are additional operations located in: Holetown, Saint James; Belleplaine, Saint Andrew; and Crab Hill, Saint Lucy.

== See also ==
- Constituency Councils
- Geography of Barbados
- History of Barbados
