= Constituency Councils =

Constituency Councils are the most local statutory representative bodies today in Barbados.

The Constituency councils are somewhat similar to parish councils that existed in Barbados at one time, mainly to communicate local opinion to larger bodies in the central government.

They were founded in 2008 as part of various campaign promises made during the general elections held in Barbados.

The Constituency Councils are a return toward providing Barbadians with a form of local governance. In the 1960s local government councils were an official part of the Barbadian Government.

Initial startup funding for the councils was made by the People's Republic of China to the Prime Minister and the people of Barbados during a state visit made by the Barbadian head of Government to China.

Within each Constituency will be Constituency Empowerment Centres.

== See also ==
- Districts of Barbados (Defunct)
- Parishes of Barbados
- List of parliamentary constituencies of Barbados
