= The Ursuline Convent (Barbados) =

Coordinates: 13.094030°N 59.605331°W

The Ursuline Convent was founded in 1894 by nuns of the order of St. Ursula.

The Convent Schools, as they are collectively known, offer Primary education for boys and girls aged 3 to 11, and Secondary education for boys and girls aged 11 to 17.

St. Angela's is the Infant and Junior School, and St. Ursula's is the Senior School.

The School is located in a commercial area in the Bridgetown suburb of Collymore Rock, where fine examples of early colonial-style architecture can be seen today.

As a result of various challenges, such as dwindling enrollment and the COVID-19 pandemic, the school closed in August 2023.
