= Music history of Barbados =

The music of Barbados draws on the island's cultural heritage, and the music history of Barbados reflects the island's diverse cultures.

== Early history ==
While slavery was ongoing (1627–1838) in Barbados, African music included work songs, funereal and religious music. Though slave owners initially allowed dances, this ended in 1688 out of fear that the slaves might plan a rebellion at such festivities. The same 1630 law also prohibited the use of drums and horns, which were feared might be used as communication to facilitate slave rebellions. The elite plantocracy of the island during the colonial era felt that Christianity was ill-suited for slaves; instead, the Church of England sent missionaries to convert the slave population. Any cultural element of apparent African origin was suppressed in the name of promoting Christianity. Legal restrictions furthered this goal by banning parties on Sundays, the Christian day of rest, as well as dances like the outdoors fertility dance, Jean and Johnnie.

Traditional African music continued in spite of legal restrictions, including the use of drums and rattles, and declamatory and improvised call and response vocals. Much African music was used in Obeah, an African religion found throughout the island. By the beginning of the 19th century, slaves provided most of the musical accompaniment for plantation festivities, such as the Harvest Home, while the white elites participated in dignity balls.

== 19th century ==
With the slave population approaching three times the white population, many slave owners feared revolts. This led to the Slave Consolidation Act in 1826, which reaffirmed the ban on drums and horns. Christian missionaries also discouraged the performance of African music, which pushed the field underground, where it was passed through secret societies and rituals. Slavery in Barbados was finally ended in 1838, and newly emancipated blacks celebrated with instruments including drums and horns, as well as banjos, tambourines and xylophones. Still, however, the use of horns and drums was discouraged, leading to the primacy of vocal music; at the same time, new Protestant churches from North American moved into the island, bringing with them American parlor music, cowboy songs and revivalist hymns.

Following emancipation, ensembles consisting of snare and bass drums, flute and triangle emerged; these were called tuk bands, and may have been based on British fife-and-drum corps. They used African polyrhythms and syncopation, and accompanied the community dance troupe Landship, which simulated the movement of ships at sea through dance, as well as at various kinds of celebrations and festivals. In 1889, the Royal Barbados Police Band formed. This instrumental ensemble remains popular, and has performed across the world.

== 20th century ==
Early in the 20th century, calypso music arrived from Trinidad. Without many local fans, only a few Barbadian calypsonians arose, including Da Costa Allamby and Mighty Charmer. Beginning in about the 1940s, when the crop over festival was cancelled due to the decline of the sugarcane industry, Barbados has seen the influx of popular music from other countries, including the United States, United Kingdom, Jamaica and Cuba.

Following independence in 1966, Barbadian calypso became more popular, especially the band The Merrymen, known for songs like "Brudda Neddy" and "Millie Gone to Brazil". Jackie Opel, a Barbadian singer, also arose, playing a blend of calypso and reggae that evolved into spouge music. Spouge was immensely popular in Barbados from about 1969 to 1973. In 1974, the Crop Over Festival was revived, featuring calypso competitions; as a result, calypso's popularity grew, rapidly overshadowing spouge and other genres, with only dub music achieving equal stature.

== See also ==
- List of Barbadians, (persons from Barbados.)

== Bibliography ==
"Independence Day Military Parades". All Info About Barbados. Archived from the original on June 25, 2006.

- "Tuk band". All Info About Barbados. Archived from the original on June 25, 2006.
- "The Barbados Landship". All Info About Barbados. Archived from the original on June 25, 2006.
- Louise Nevelson (1996). Caribbean Islands Handbook with the Bahamas. Passport Books. ISBN 0-8442-4907-6.
- "Calypso". Barbados Music. Barbados.org.
- Pinckney, Warren R. Jr (Spring 1994). "Jazz in Barbados". American Music. 12 (1). Society for American Music: 58–88. doi:10.2307/3052491. JSTOR 3052491.
