= Geography of Barbados =

Barbados
Nickname: Bimshire or Little England
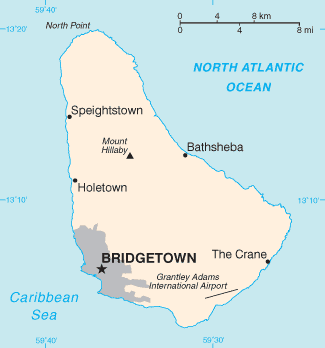
- Map of Barbados

- Location within Barbados Location within Lesser Antilles Location within the Caribbean

Geography
- Location: Atlantic Ocean
- Coordinates: 13°10′N 59°33′W
- Area: 439 km^{2} (169 sq mi)
- Length: 34 km (21.1 mi)
- Width: 24 km (14.9 mi)
- Coastline: 97 km (60.3 mi)
- Highest elevation: 336 m (1102 ft)
- Highest point: Mount Hillaby

Administration
- Barbados
- Largest settlement: Bridgetown (pop. 96,578)

Demographics
- Population: 279,000 (2006)
- Pop. density: 648.84/km^{2} (1680.49/sq mi)
- Ethnic groups: 90% Afro-Caribbean, 4% European, 6% Asian and Multiracial

Barbados is a continental island in the Atlantic Ocean east of the Caribbean and is located at 13°10' north of the equator, and 59°32' west of the Prime Meridian. As the easternmost isle of the Lesser Antilles in the West Indies, Barbados lies 160 kilometres (100 mi) east of the Windward Islands and Caribbean Sea. The maritime claim for Barbados is a territorial sea of 12 nmi (22.2 km; 13.8 mi), with an exclusive economic zone of 200 nmi (370.4 km; 230.2 mi) which gives Barbados a total maritime area of 186,898 km^{2} (72,162 mi^{2}). Of the total EEZ area, 70,000 km^{2} is set aside for offshore oil exploration. A pending application to UNCLOS has placed for consideration a continental shelf 200 nmi (370.4 km; 230.2 mi) to the east and south (or to the edge of the continental margin). To the west, most of Barbados's maritime boundaries consist of median lines with neighbours. These neighbours include: Martinique, and Saint Lucia to the northwest, Saint Vincent and the Grenadines to the west, Trinidad and Tobago and Venezuela to the southwest, and Guyana to the southeast.

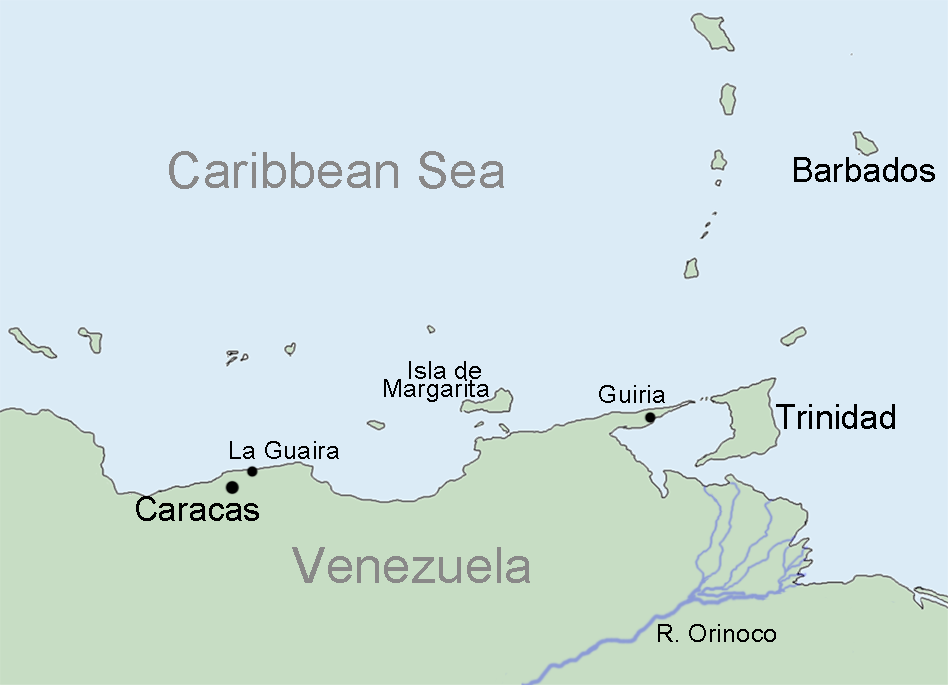
The coast of Venezuela, South America and Barbados

Barbados's total land area is 439 km^{2} (169.5 sq mi), and it has a coastline of 97 km (60 mi) length. The island is sometimes compared to a pear or leg of mutton for its physical shape. Barbados has a maximum north–south length of 34 kilometres (21 mi) and a maximum east–west breadth of 23 kilometres (14 mi).

== Physical characteristics ==
The physical characteristics of Barbados are its lowlands or gently sloping, terraced plains, separated by rolling hills that generally parallel the coasts. Elevations in the interior range from 180 to 240 meters above sea level. Mount Hillaby is the highest point at 340 meters above sea level. Farther south, at Christ Church Ridge, elevations range from sixty to ninety meters. Eighty-five percent of the island's surface consists of coralline limestone twenty-four to thirty meters thick; Scotland District contains outcroppings of oceanic formations at the surface, however. Sugarcane is planted on almost 80 percent of the island's limestone surface. The soils vary in fertility; erosion is a problem, with crop loss resulting from landslides, washouts, and falling rocks. Most of the small streams are in Scotland District. The rest of the island has few surface streams; nevertheless, rainwater saturates the soil to produce underground channels such as the famous Coles Cave. Also notable in the island is the rocky cape known as Pico Teneriffe or Pico de Tenerife, which is named after the fact that the island of Tenerife in Spain is the first land east of Barbados according to the belief of the locals.

In Barbados forest cover is around 15% of the total land area, equivalent to 6,300 hectares (ha) of forest in 2020, which was unchanged from 1990. In 2020, naturally regenerating forest covered 6,300 hectares (ha) and planted forest covered 0 hectares (ha). Of the naturally regenerating forest 0% was reported to be primary forest (consisting of native tree species with no clearly visible indications of human activity) and around 5% of the forest area was found within protected areas. For the year 2015, 1% of the forest area was reported to be under public ownership, 0% private ownership and 99% with ownership listed as other or unknown.

== Populated places ==
List of: Cities, towns and villages in Barbados.

- Bridgetown
- Holetown
- Oistins
- Six Cross Roads
- Speightstown
- Saint Lawrence Gap
- Warrens
- Black Rock, Barbados
- Bank Hall

== Proposed developments ==
In 2009 and 2010, members of the upscale real estate industry in Barbados proposed the creation of artificial islands to be placed off the west coast. According to Paul Altman of Altman Realty the envisioned plan, would consist of two islands, one measuring 250 acres (1.0 km^{2}) in size, and would house new tourism based developments and upscale boutique shops; while the second island would be 50 acres (200,000 m^{2}) in size, and would serve as an open national park. Both proposed islands would be a short distance from the Deep Water Harbour in Bridgetown.

The south-eastern part of the island has undergone small scale oil and gas capturing from possibly as early as 1919 when the British Union Oil Company acquired over 75% of the drilling rights in Barbados. Similar to Trinidad and Tobago to the southwest, the territorial Atlantic Ocean surrounding Barbados has been found to contain fossil fuels, however ongoing research is being conducted to give estimates of actual quantities.

== Time zone ==
Barbados is in the Eastern Caribbean Time Zone. Barbados no longer observes Daylight Saving Time. It was last used between Sunday, 20 April 1980 at 2:00 AM and Thursday, 25 September 1980 at 2:00 AM. On 25 September of that year the clock was shifted from -3:00 to -4:00, where it has remained since.

== Statistics ==
=== Location ===
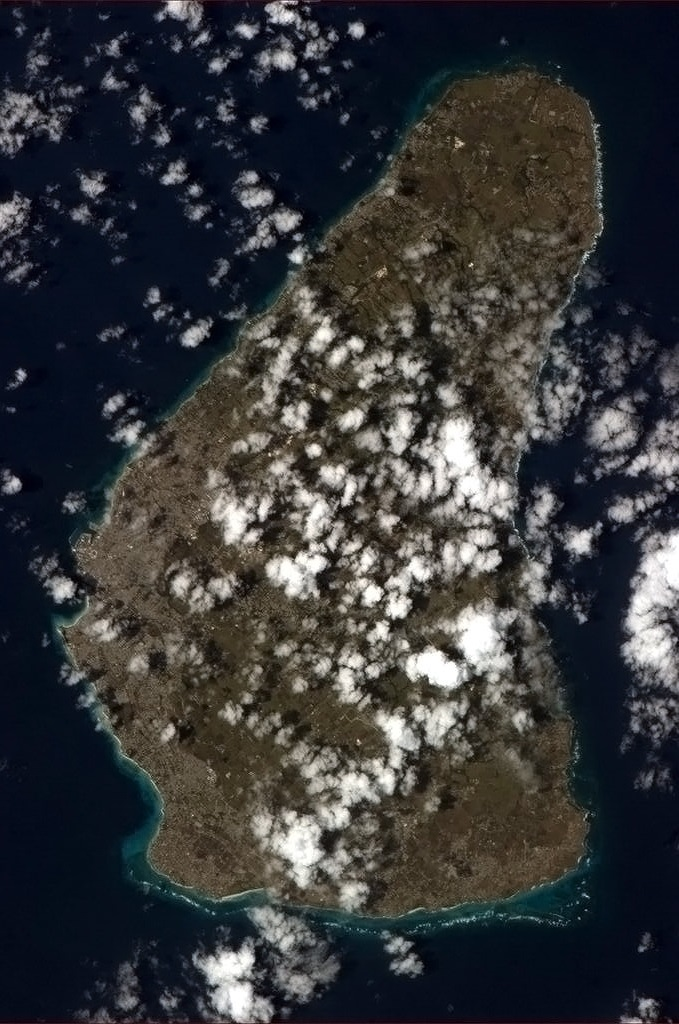
Barbados, seen from the International Space Station

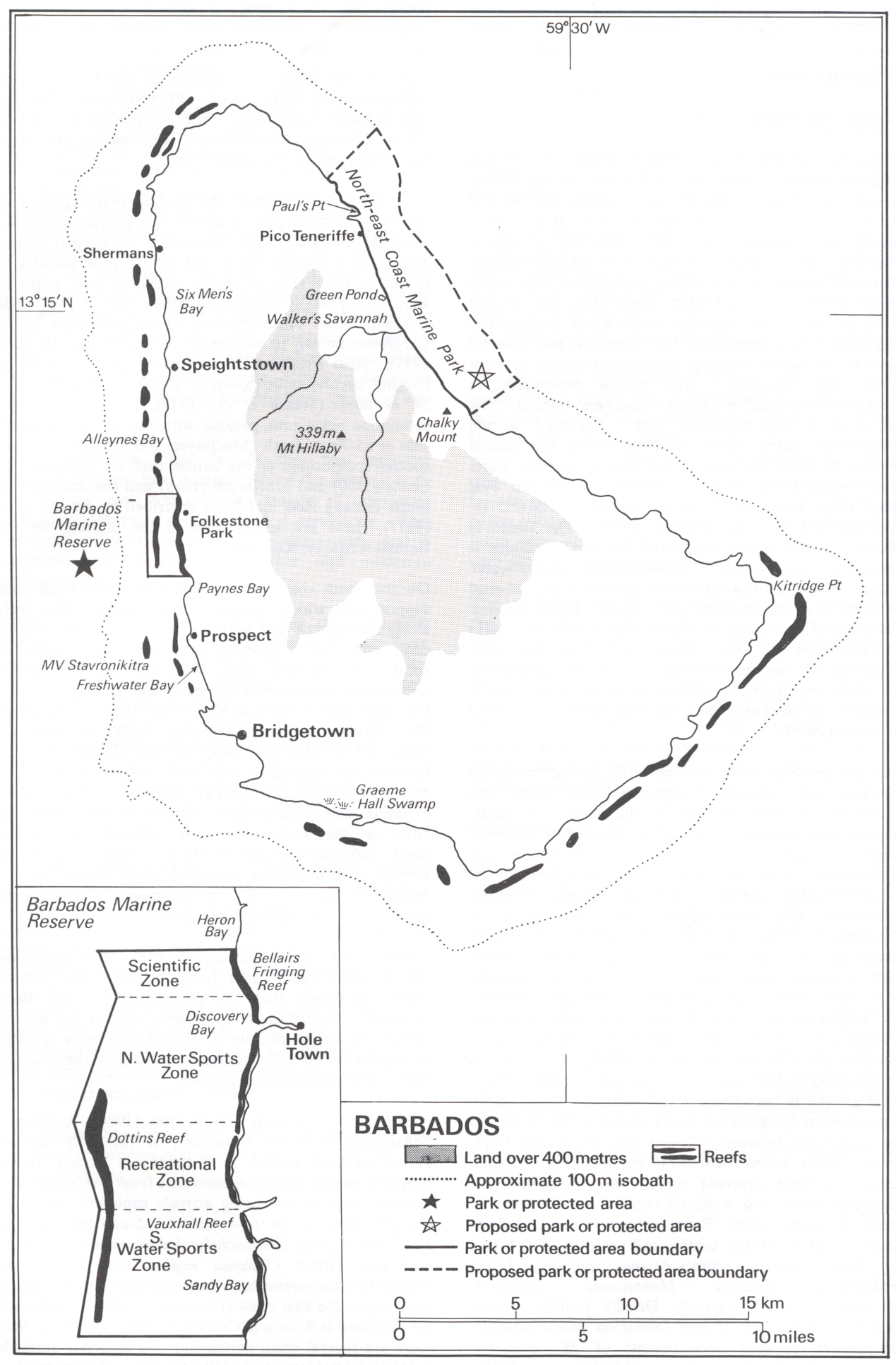
Barbados's offshore coral reefs.

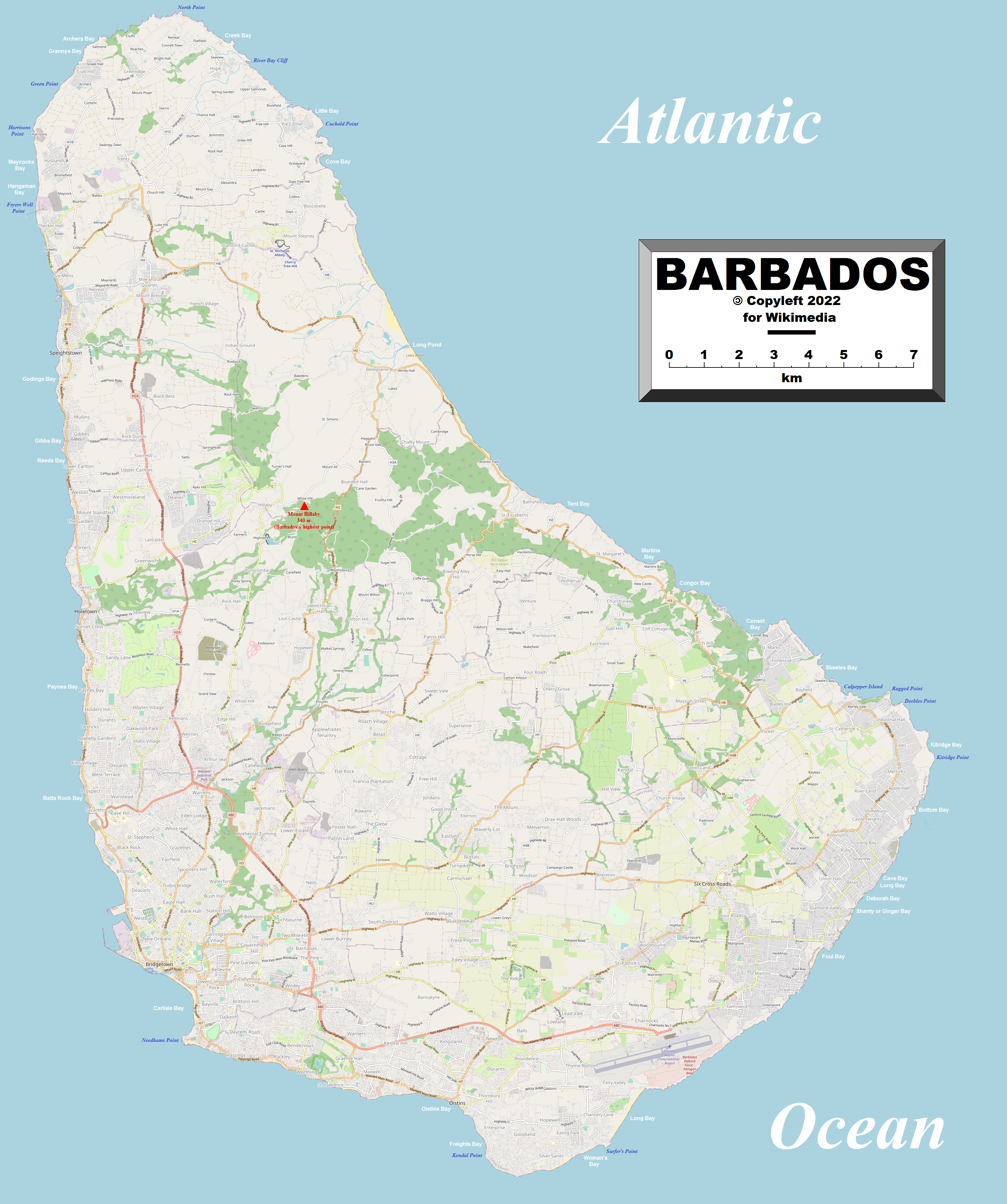
Barbados's cities, towns, villages and road network

Barbados is located 100 miles (160 km) east of the Caribbean Sea and the Windward Islands in the North Atlantic Ocean, most directly east of Saint Vincent and the Grenadines.

Map references
Central America and the Caribbean

=== Area ===
- Total: 430 km²
- Land: 430 km²
- Water: 0 km²

=== Area comparative ===
- Australia comparative: less than one-fifth of the area of the Australian Capital Territory
- Canada comparative: slightly larger than London in the Province of Ontario
- United Kingdom comparative: slightly larger than the Isle of Wight or Saint Helena
- United States comparative: 2.5 times the size of Washington, DC, about the size of San Antonio, Texas, or half the size of New York City

=== Land boundaries ===
0 km
Coastline
97 km
Maritime claims
- Territorial sea: 12 nmi (22.2 km; 13.8 mi)
- Exclusive economic zone: 186,898 km^{2} (72,162 mi^{2}) and 200 nmi (370.4 km; 230.2 mi)

=== Climate ===
Tropical; rainy season (June to October)

=== Terrain ===
Relatively flat; rises gently to central highland region
Extreme points
- Northernmost point – North Point, Saint Lucy
- Southernmost point – South Point, Silver Sands, Christ Church
- Westernmost point – Harrison Point, Saint Lucy
- Easternmost point – Kitridge Point, Saint Philip
- Lowest point: Atlantic Ocean: 0 m
- Highest point: Mount Hillaby: 336 m

=== Natural resources ===
Fish, natural gas

=== Land use ===
- Arable land: 25.58%
- Permanent crops: 2.33%
- Other: 72.09% (2012)
Irrigated land
54.35 km² (2003)
Total renewable water sources
0.08 cu km (2011)
Freshwater withdrawal (domestic/industrial/agricultural)
total: 0.1 cu km/yr (20%/26%/254)
per capita: 371.3 cu m/yr (200p)

=== Natural hazards ===
Infrequent hurricanes; periodic landslides; periodic flooding, from storm surge and intense rainfall events; and occasional droughts, causing fires.

=== Environment - current issues ===
Pollution of coastal waters from waste disposal by ships; soil erosion; illegal solid waste disposal threatens contamination of aquifers
Environment - international agreements
- Party to: Biodiversity, Climate Change, Climate Change-Kyoto Protocol, Desertification, Endangered Species, Hazardous Wastes, Law of the Sea, Marine Dumping, Ozone Layer Protection, Ship Pollution, Wetlands
- Signed, but not ratified: none of the selected agreements
Geography - note
Easternmost Caribbean island

== Climate ==
Barbados is the twentieth most water stressed country in the world.

Barbados lies within the tropics. Its generally pleasant maritime climate is influenced by northeast trade winds, which moderate the tropical temperature. Cool, northeasterly trade winds are prevalent during the December to June dry season. The overall annual temperature ranges from 24 to 28 °C (75.2 to 82.4 °F); slightly lower temperatures prevail at higher elevations. Humidity levels are between 71 percent and 76 percent year round. Rainfall occurs primarily between July and December and varies considerably with elevation. Rainfall may average 1,875 millimeters (73.8 in) per year in the higher central area as compared with 1,275 millimeters (50.2 in) in the coastal zone.

Climate data for Bridgetown (Grantley Adams International Airport) 1991–2020, extremes 1944–present
Month	Jan	Feb	Mar	Apr	May	Jun	Jul	Aug	Sep	Oct	Nov	Dec	Year
Record high °C (°F)	32.0 (89.6)	31.2 (88.2)	31.9 (89.4)	32.6 (90.7)	33.1 (91.6)	32.7 (90.9)	32.4 (90.3)	35.0 (95.0)	33.3 (91.9)	33.3 (91.9)	33.3 (91.9)	31.3 (88.3)	35.0 (95.0)
Mean daily maximum °C (°F)	29.1 (84.4)	29.2 (84.6)	29.7 (85.5)	30.2 (86.4)	30.6 (87.1)	30.7 (87.3)	30.7 (87.3)	30.9 (87.6)	31.0 (87.8)	30.8 (87.4)	30.3 (86.5)	29.6 (85.3)	30.2 (86.4)
Daily mean °C (°F)	26.0 (78.8)	25.9 (78.6)	26.3 (79.3)	27.0 (80.6)	27.7 (81.9)	27.8 (82.0)	27.8 (82.0)	27.9 (82.2)	27.9 (82.2)	27.7 (81.9)	27.2 (81.0)	26.6 (79.9)	27.2 (80.9)
Mean daily minimum °C (°F)	23.3 (73.9)	23.0 (73.4)	23.4 (74.1)	24.2 (75.6)	25.0 (77.0)	25.2 (77.4)	25.1 (77.2)	24.8 (76.6)	24.8 (76.6)	24.7 (76.5)	24.5 (76.1)	23.9 (75.0)	24.3 (75.8)
Record low °C (°F)	16.0 (60.8)	16.0 (60.8)	16.0 (60.8)	19.0 (66.2)	19.4 (66.9)	20.0 (68.0)	19.3 (66.7)	19.1 (66.4)	20.6 (69.1)	20.6 (69.1)	18.0 (64.4)	17.4 (63.3)	16.0 (60.8)
Average rainfall mm (inches)	68.1 (2.68)	41.7 (1.64)	38.9 (1.53)	58.1 (2.29)	74.1 (2.92)	101.2 (3.98)	121.5 (4.78)	150.6 (5.93)	162.6 (6.40)	179.6 (7.07)	172.6 (6.80)	91.0 (3.58)	1,260 (49.6)
Average rainy days	11	9	8	8	8	11	15	16	13	15	14	11	139
Average relative humidity (%)	77	76	75	76	77	79	80	81	81	82	82	78	79
Mean monthly sunshine hours	263.5	248.6	272.8	261.0	263.5	225.0	251.1	260.4	234.0	238.7	228.0	254.2	3,000.8
Mean daily sunshine hours	8.5	8.8	8.8	8.7	8.5	7.5	8.1	8.4	7.8	7.7	7.6	8.2	8.2
Source 1: Barbados Meteorological Services
Source 2: Meteo Climat (record highs and lows)

== Disputes ==
Guyana's and Barbados's offshore territorial claims overlap, and are also disputed with Venezuela, which itself claims ownership of the waters overlapping the first two. In 2008 Barbados sought to place the oil blocks on open market for oil exploration tender but faced a challenge by Venezuela's government in Caracas.

In 2006 a local Barbadian group purporting to represent descendants of indigenous Caribbean peoples announced its claim to Culpepper Island, a small rocky outcrop on the eastern shore of Barbados.

== Oceanography ==
Due to the location of Barbados far east of Windward Islands chain it possesses an expansive Exclusive Economic Zone of about 185,000 km^{2} (71,000 mi^{2}) extending predominantly to the east.

== See also ==
- English place names in Barbados
