= Barbados Wildlife Reserve =

Wildlife reserve in Barbados

Coordinates: 13.26839°N 59.59233°W

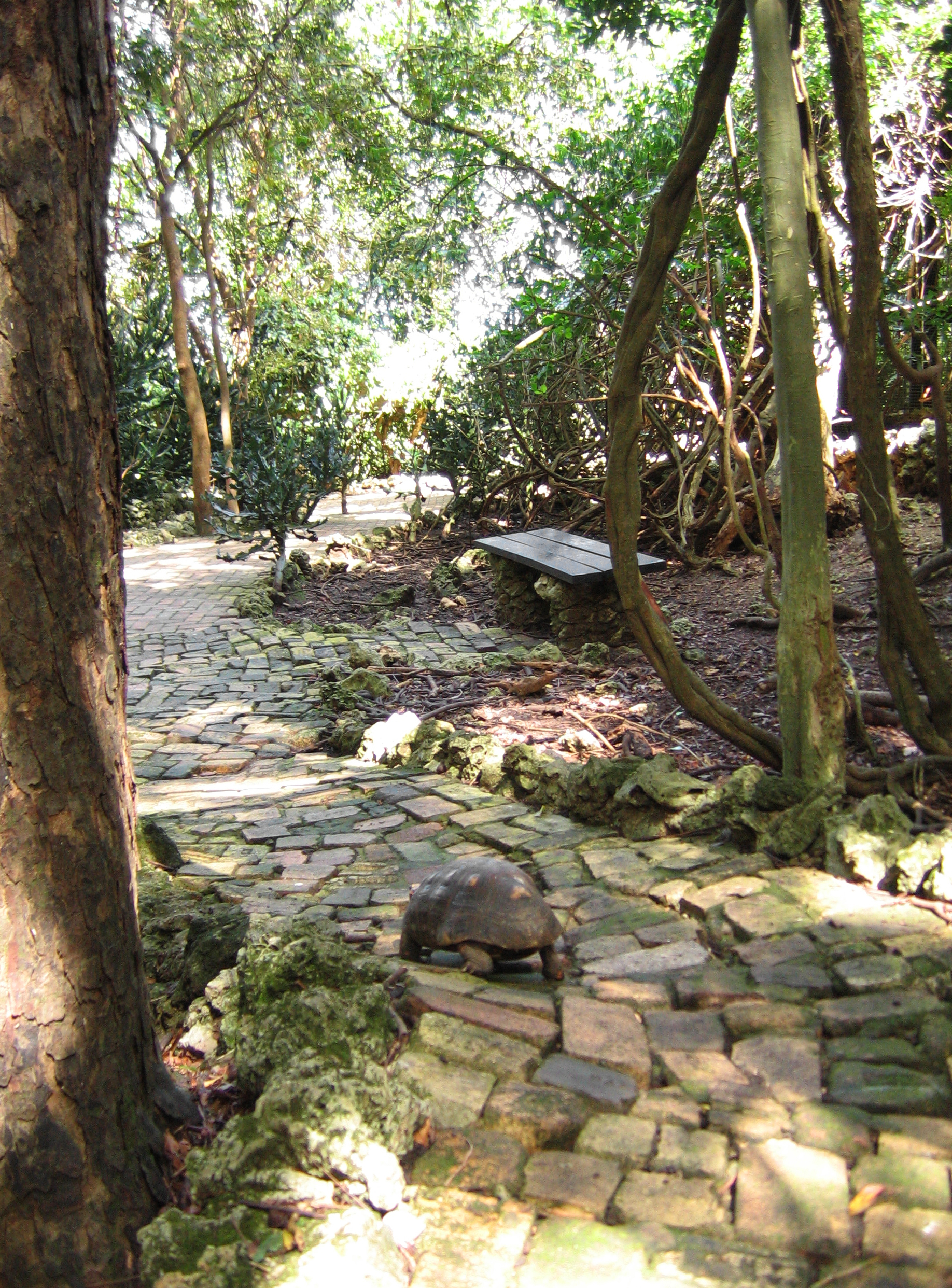
A red-footed tortoise wanders down a path in the wildlife reserve.

The Barbados Wildlife Reserve is located in the parish of Saint Peter, Barbados. It occupies four acres of mahogany forest near the top of Farley Hill, next to Grenade Hall Signal Station and Forest.

It was established by Canadian primatologist Jean Baulu and his wife, Suzanne. They first founded the Barbados Primate Research Centre on the site in 1982, for the conservation and study of green monkeys, which were brought to Barbados in the 17th century and are now widespread on the island. It was expanded into a wildlife reserve in 1985, with funding from the Canadian International Development Agency.

In addition to the green monkeys, which roam freely in and out of the fenced enclosure, the wildlife reserve also keeps a variety of other animals, many of which roam the reserve freely without separation from visitors. These include red brockets, red-footed tortoises, Patagonian maras, Cuban rock iguanas, and numerous caged tropical birds.

The buildings in the wildlife reserve are all constructed from coral rock, excavated from nearby sugarcane fields. All of the bricks that form its paths were recycled from sugar factories.
