= Barbados Lottery =

National lottery in Barbados

The Barbados Lottery is the national lottery in Barbados. It is operated by the gaming company International Game Technology (IGT). The four license holders and beneficiaries of the Barbados Lottery include the Barbados Cricket Association, Barbados Olympic Association, Barbados Turf Club, and the National Sports Council.

In September 2025, the company installed 27 lottery vending machines across the island.
