= Immigration to Barbados =

Migration origin

In more recent history Barbados comparatively is experiencing increased levels of immigration than some of its nearby neighbours in the Caribbean region. The number of illegal Caribbean migrants in Barbados was estimated to be less than 10,000 individuals in the late 1990s, but between 2001 and 2009, the minister of immigration for the country stated that an estimated 30,000 Caricom nationals travelled to Barbados and did not leave.

== History ==
The British that first landed in Barbados recorded that there were no persons living in Barbados at the time of landing at James Town in the 17th century. The British Government next sent large numbers of persons from Scotland and Ireland to the island, many were indentured servants sent in order to work off or settle debts owed to the British Government.

In the years that followed, Jewish migrants from the then Dutch controlled areas of modern-day Brazil sought safe passage to Barbados. As the Jewish community brought their advanced agricultural technology to Barbados, plantations boomed with the introduction of Sugar cane. This led to large groups of African people being brought to Barbados as slaves. Large numbers of African descendants began to outnumber the Europeans, who were represented by large numbers of Irish people from Ireland was then under British rule.

Many European immigrants came to Barbados in the 19th and early 20th centuries: the French, Germans, Austrians, Greeks, Italians, Portuguese and Russians emigrated to the island to escape World War II and the Cold war.

In the years that followed other groups of Europeans, East Indians, and a small number of Asians developed their own communities in Barbados in the late 20th century.

In April 2012 the Prime Minister of Barbados held the first official new citizens ceremony at the Lloyd Erskine Sandiford Centre in St. Michael. In November 2012 the second new citizens' ceremony took place.

== Travel to Barbados ==
Nationals of CARICOM member states, the US, Canada, the UK, and some Commonwealth countries can travel directly to Barbados with acceptable proof of nationality and identity (a valid passport from their country and/or original birth certificate with national photo identification) and may be admitted for a period not exceeding three months. All visitors are required to have onward or return tickets.

Recent information from the Immigration Department indicates that CARICOM skilled nationals are required to arrive in Barbados with return airline tickets until they have been formally registered with the Immigration Department as such. The registration process can take up to four weeks to complete, and includes submitting to the Immigration Department a registration form (available at the Immigration Department or at the BIDC), along with the following documentation:

- Four photographs
- Police certificate of character (from home country)
- Birth certificate
- Documentary proof of qualifications
- Letter from employer, where applicable
- Document certifying citizenship by descent, where necessary

== See also ==
- Demographics of Barbados
- Afro-Barbadian
- Irish in Barbados (Red Legs)
- Indians in Barbados
- Jews in Barbados
- Barbadian people, such as Barbadian Americans and Barbadian British.
- List of countries by foreign-born population
- List of sovereign states and dependent territories by fertility rate
