= Barbadian Americans =

Americans of Barbadian (or Bajan) birth or descent

Total population
- 68,234 (2019)

Regions with significant populations
- Mainly in states include New York, Massachusetts, Pennsylvania, New Jersey, Connecticut, Rhode Island, Florida and Georgia; Smaller numbers in parts of the country including Illinois, Wisconsin, Delaware, Maryland, Minnesota, Texas, Washington, Colorado and California

Languages
- English (American English, Barbadian English), Bajan Creole

Religion
- Hinduism; Christianity; Islam

Related ethnic groups
- Barbadians; Kalinago; Jamaican Americans; Guyanese Americans; Afro-Caribbean Americans; Indo-Caribbean Americans; African Americans; English Americans; Portuguese Americans; Scottish Americans; Irish Americans; German Americans; Austrian Americans; Russian Americans; Arab Americans; Indian Americans; Chinese Americans; Native Americans; Liberian Americans; South African Americans; Ghanaian Americans; Nigerian Americans; Sierra Leonean Americans; Gambian Americans

Barbadian (or Bajan) Americans are Americans of full or partial Barbadian heritage. The 2000 Census recorded 53,785 United States residents born in Barbados, 52,170 of whom were born to non-American parents and 54,509 people who described their ethnicity as Barbadian. The 2010 US Census estimated that report stated more than 62,000 Barbadian Americans lived in the United States, most of whom are in the area of New York City extending from Rhode Island to Delaware. In past years, some also moved to the areas of Chicago, Illinois and Boston, Massachusetts.

== History ==
The first Barbadian immigrants in the United States were white Barbadian settlers. Some of these white settlers from Barbados were former indentured servants, who were replaced by African black slaves brought to the island in vast numbers for its flourishing sugar industry after 1650. Before English colonists settled Charles Town in 1670, the Lords Proprietors of Carolina studied the sugar plantation system in Barbados and invited white Barbadian settlers to help establish colony. Some settlers rbought enslaved Africans and African Barbadians with them. Barbadians were sent to Carolina as slaves. The first West Indians brought to the United States were forced laborers from Barbados, who were transferred to South Carolina in the 1670s to work on plantations. Slaves from Barbados became a significant part of the black population in Virginia, mainly in the tidewater region of the Chesapeake Bay. Barbadian settlers brought the West Indian plantation model to Carolina, where it helped rice cultivation by the 1690s.

== Settlement patterns ==
Barbadians are concentrated in New York City, primarily in Brooklyn and Queens. Barbadian immigrants began settling in New York around the year 1900.

Nearly 57% of Barbadians in the United States live in New York and around 9% live in Florida.

The counties with the largest Barbadian population are Erie County, New York, Monroe County, New York, Westchester County, New York, Rockland County, New York, Kings County, New York, Queens County, New York, Bronx County, New York, Nassau County, New York, Suffolk County, Massachusetts and Broward County, Florida.

== Politics and government ==
Eric Holder, the 82nd United States Attorney General, has roots in Barbados. His father Eric Himpton Holder, Sr. (1905–1970) was born in St. Joseph, Barbados. His mother Miriam's birth occurred in New Jersey to parents who were immigrants from Saint Philip, Barbados.

The Barbados government also maintains diplomatic and consular representation in a handful of American cities and towns. These include an Embassy in Washington, D.C., two Consulates-General in: Miami, New York City; a Permanent Mission to the United Nations in New York City; and is also further supported by a collection of Honorary Consulates in: Atlanta, Boston, Denver, Detroit, Houston, Los Angeles, Louisville, New Orleans, Portland, San Francisco, and Toledo.

== See also ==
- Barbadians
- West Indian Americans
- African Americans
- Barbadian British
- Barbados–United States relations
- Caribbean immigration to New York City
