= Judiciary of Barbados =

The Judiciary of Barbados is an independent branch of the Barbadian government, subject only to the Barbadian Constitution. It is headed by the Chief Justice of Barbados. Barbados is a common law jurisdiction, in which precedents from English law and British Commonwealth tradition may be taken into account.

== Structure ==
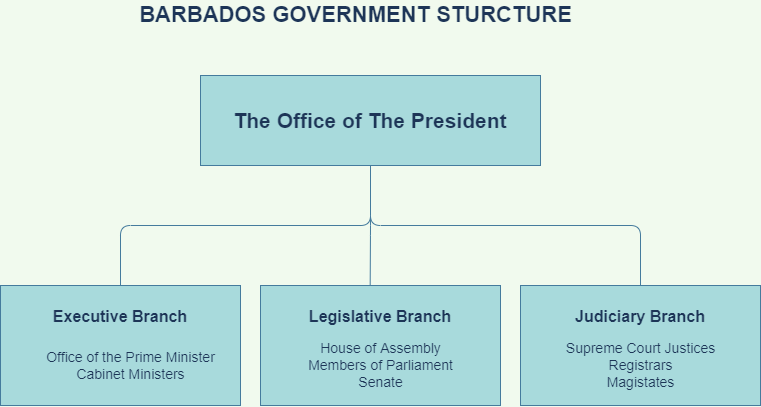
Simplification of the government structure of Barbados

There are three levels of courts in Barbados, structured as follows:

- The magistrates' courts
- The Supreme Court, made up of:
  - The High Court
  - The Court of Appeal
    - Caribbean Court of Justice, which replaced the Judicial Committee of the Privy Council in 2005 in cases originating from Barbados.

The Constitution places the Caribbean Court of Justice at the pinnacle of the Barbadian judicial system. The Court has two types of jurisdictions: appellate jurisdiction and original jurisdiction.

In its appellate jurisdiction, the court serves as the final court of appeal from any decision given by the Court of Appeal of Barbados in civil and criminal matters. In its original jurisdiction, the Caribbean Court of Justice is a court of first instance which applies rules of international law in respect to the interpretation and application of the Revised Treaty of Chaguaramas. In its original jurisdiction, it exercises both exclusive and compulsory jurisdiction in: 1. Disputes between contracting parties to the agreement establishing the Caribbean Court of Justice; 2. Disputes between any contracting party to the agreement and the Caribbean Community; 3. Referrals from national courts or tribunals of contracting parties to the agreement 4. Applications by persons in accordance with the Caribbean Court of Justice Act concerning the interpretation and application of the treaty.

The court also has exclusive jurisdiction: (i) to deliver advisory opinions concerning the application of the Treaty upon request of Contracting Parties or the Community; and (ii) where there is a dispute as to whether the Court has jurisdiction in a matter, to decide whether the court has such jurisdiction.

The jurisdiction of the Caribbean Court of Justice is exercised in accordance with Rules of Court governing proceedings in the court's appellate and original jurisdictions.

The magistrates' courts (lower court) have of summary jurisdiction dealing with civil, family, and criminal matters. But can also take up matters dealing with Coroner's Inquests, Liquor Licences, and civil marriages. The Magistrates' Courts also deal with Contract and Tort law where claims do not exceed $10,000.00.

The magistrates' courts in Barbados include:

- District A | Bridgetown, Saint Michael
  - Criminal Court
  - Traffic Court
- District A & C | Saint Matthias, Christ Church
- District B | Saint George
- District B | Oistins, Christ Church
- District C | See under Saint Matthias
- District D | Saint Thomas & District F (Belleplaine, Saint Andrew)
- District E | Speightstown, Saint Peter
  - Holetown, Saint James
- District F | Saint Joseph

== Supreme Court of Judicature ==
The High Court has a more expansive jurisdiction than the magistrates' courts – dealing with serious civil and criminal matters and together with the Court of Appeal, acting as a Court of Appeal for matters coming from the magistrate courts. The Court of Appeal may also hear appeals from the High Court. The High Court and the Court of Appeal make up the Supreme Court. It may sit as a single Justice of Appeal in chambers, or as full court of three Justices of Appeal.

All criminal cases (both summary and indictable) commence in the Magistrates' Court. Summary cases are heard in full by the Magistrates' Court. Indictable cases proceed to the High Court after a preliminary inquiry is conducted to determine that there is a prima facie case to answer. Once judgement is passed, a case may be appealed by either party and will then proceed to the Appeal Court. The number and severity of criminal cases dealt with by each level of the courts varies, as does the level of detail that is recorded (specifically the reasons for adjournment).

== Further appeals ==
Barbados is one of four Commonwealth Caribbean countries (along with Dominica, Guyana, and Belize), that recognises the Caribbean Court of Justice as their final court of appeal. In matters of human rights, Barbados is one of a handful of countries in the Americas, and the only one in the Anglophone Caribbean that fully accepts judgements by the Inter-American Court of Human Rights. In 2011 some pressure was placed on the government to withdraw from the Inter-American Court. Like Trinidad and Tobago, Barbados applied for reserve powers dealing with death penalty (for persons convicted of murder) as these laws were aspects statutory law inherited from the United Kingdom. The government of the Republic of Trinidad and Tobago which was unsure of receiving such a waiver and formally withdrew its intent of ratification to the IACHR. It appears unlikely that Barbados will be granted such a waiver per recent statements by the IACHR.

Recent polls in Barbados have shown favourable support for the return of capital punishment to general usage for persons convicted of murder. This of course is only carried out after a lengthy process of appeals. In sharp contrast to Barbados, Jamaica, The Bahamas, and Trinidad and Tobago also all within CARICOM instead utilizes the jurisdiction of the European Court of Human Rights.

== Criticism ==
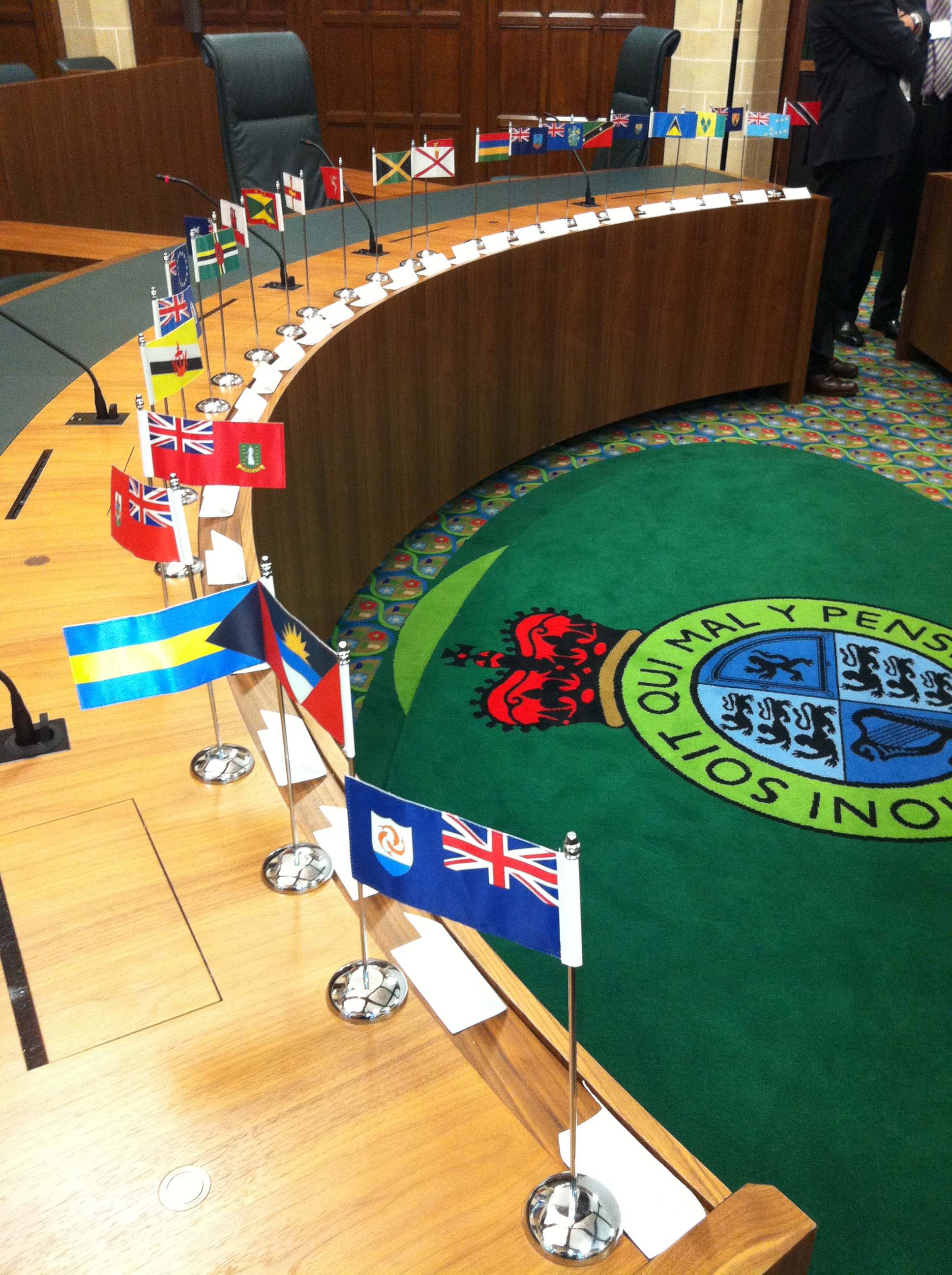
Court 3 in Middlesex Guildhall, the normal location for Privy Council hearings

In the 1990s the Judicial Committee of the Privy Council (of the United Kingdom), ruled that Barbados' Constitution was clear with respect to the death penalty. However, it ruled that to carry out such sentences it required that Barbados and other Caribbean Islands carry out trials at a quicker pace. In response to this verdict, the Barbados government announced that the country would be leaving the jurisdiction of the Privy Council and would further consider becoming a republic. Since then, calls have continued to be made by members of the local legal profession ridiculing the length of time which court cases in Barbados take to be fully adjudicated. Other criticism has been that the court process was appearing to be breaking down.

Since Barbados left the jurisdiction of the JCPC, similar sentiments have been expressed and re-iterated in 2010 by the Caribbean Court of Justice which Barbados replaced the JCPC with.

In 2011 Owen Arthur, the Leader of the Opposition announced that the BLP would not support the ruling party's goals to amend Barbadian law to allow for the appointment of Marston Gibson as the next Chief Justice of Barbados. Questions surround the fact that Mr. Gibson has not maintained the requisite 15 years of practice as an attorney-at-law in Barbados. The governing DLP maintains that it plans to proceed as planned by amending that stipulation from the Barbados Supreme Court Judicature Act.

== See also ==
- Legal systems of the world
