= George Washington House (Barbados) =

Historic home in Bridgetown, Barbados

Coordinates: 13°04′55″N 59°36′24″W

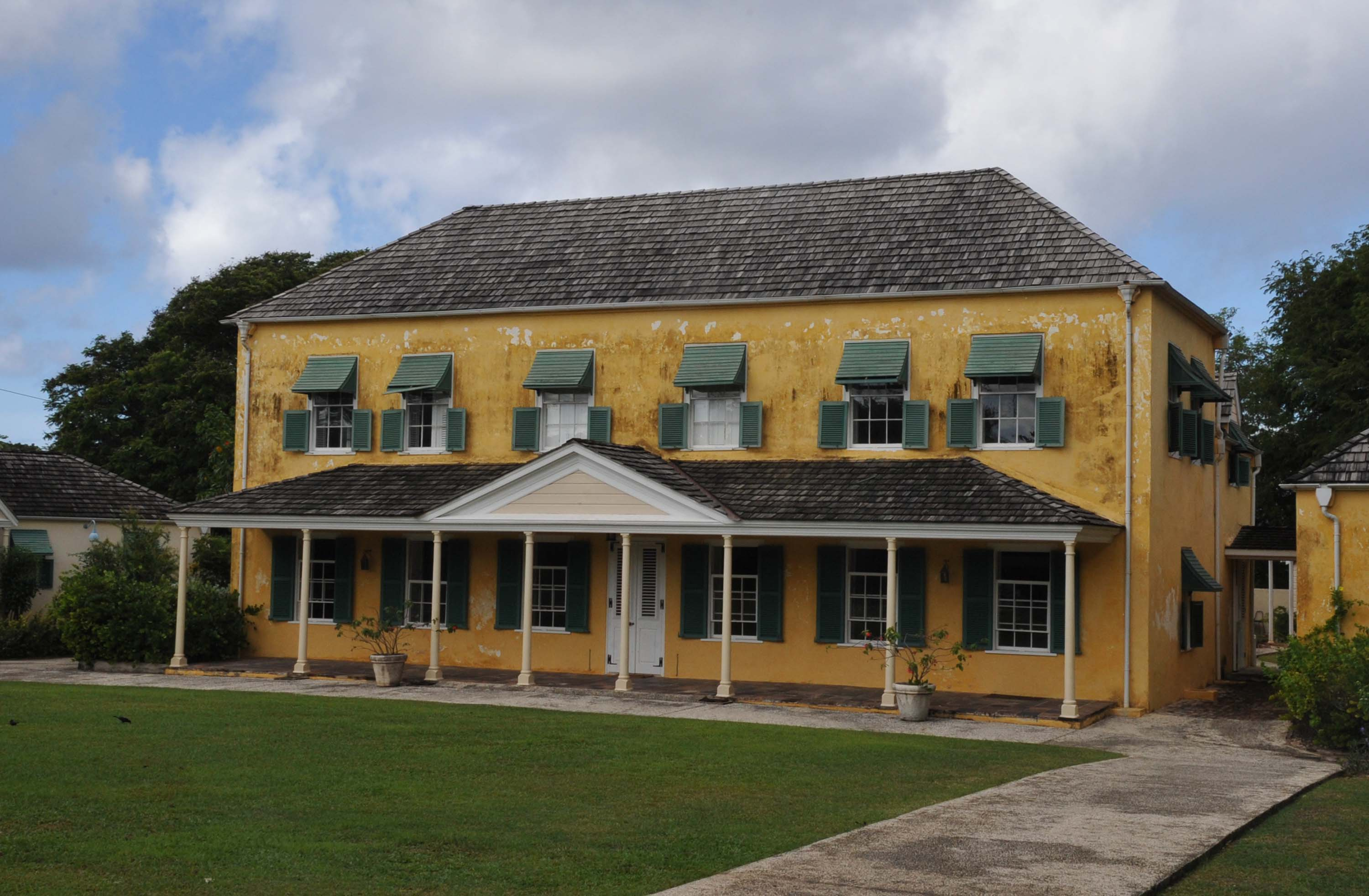
Exterior

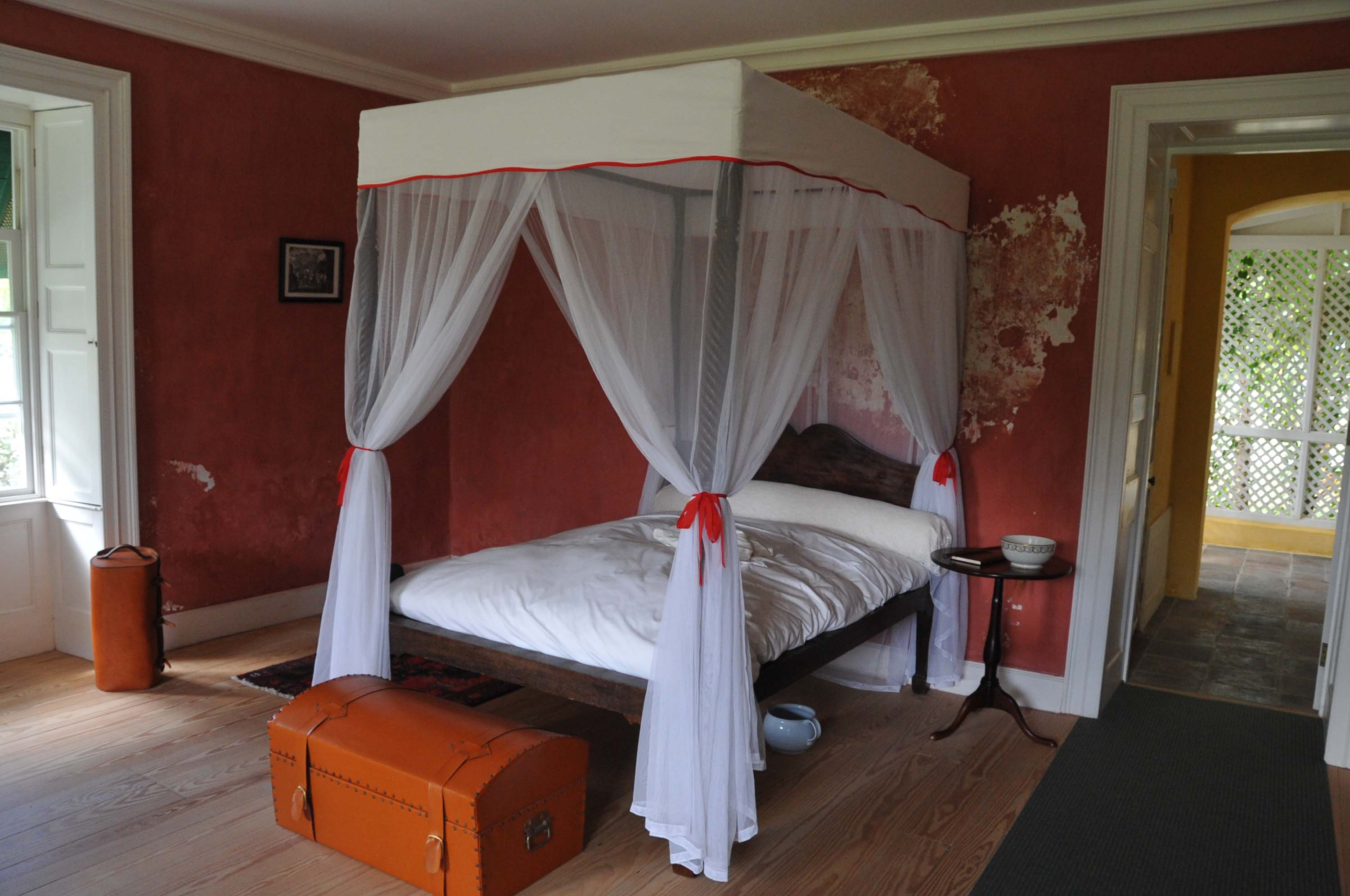
Interior

George Washington House in Barbados is a historic house where the future first U.S. President George Washington and his half-brother Lawrence stayed in 1751. The house is now a museum focusing on the Washington visit and Barbados at that time. Barbados is the only place outside the United States George Washington ever visited.

== History ==
George Washington was nineteen years old when he accompanied his half-brother Lawrence Washington to Barbados in 1751. Lawrence was suffering from a pulmonary disorder, almost certainly tuberculosis. He had been advised by physicians to spend the winter in the tropics to recover his health.

The Washington brothers arrived in Bridgetown, the capital of Barbados, on 2 November 1751. A few days later they rode out of Bridgetown to find lodgings in the country. They found a house to rent that was then about a mile from Bridgetown. It was a plantation house owned by Richard Crofton, who commanded a fort guarding Bridgetown. Lawrence Washington rented the house from Crofton for the duration of his stay on the island. The house was the center of the Washington brothers’ activities in Barbados. Most afternoons they rode back to Bridgetown to dine with new acquaintances, including local merchants, planters, officials, and British military officers. George Washington was infected with smallpox shortly after he arrived in Barbados and suffered through the illness at the house. George Washington left Barbados on 22 December 1751, and returned to Virginia. Lawrence Washington remained in Barbados for several more weeks and then sailed alone to Bermuda, where he remained for a few months before returning to Virginia, where he died on 26 July 1752.

After Lawrence left Richard Crofton conveyed the house to a creditor to settle a debt. During the American Revolutionary War the British military acquired the house for the use of the garrison assigned to defend the island. The fact that George Washington had stayed in the house had by then been forgotten. In 1910 a local historical commission incorrectly identified a nearby townhouse as the house where Washington had lived in Barbados. This mistake was documented in 1945, though a sign identifying the townhouse with Washington remained in place until the 1990s.

The George Washington House was properly identified in the 1990s. At the time it was known locally as Bush Hill House and was owned by Barbados Power and Light.

In 1997, during an official visit to Barbados with her husband, President Bill Clinton, First Lady Hillary Clinton unveiled a plaque outside the house that reads:

On the occasion of his visit to Barbados this plaque was presented by President William Jefferson Clinton to The Right Honourable Owen S. Arthur, Prime Minister, and to the People of Barbados in a spirit of friendship and goodwill which binds our two countries and in recognition that George Washington, the first President of the United States of America, lived in this house during his visit to this fair country in 1751.

The Barbados government acquired the house shortly thereafter, with the Barbados National Trust coordinating the archaeological research work, before being handed over to the Bush Hill Tourism Trust Inc. for the restoration. The completed 'George Washington House' was opened to the public, as a museum, in January 2007.

In 2011, the property was designated as a UNESCO protected property within the World Heritage Site of Historic Bridgetown and its Garrison area. The house is owned and maintained by the Bush Hill Tourism Trust Inc.

== See also ==
- List of historic buildings in Bridgetown and Saint Ann's Garrison
