= List of locations in Barbados with an English name =

English place names in Barbados is a list of Barbadian place names that were originally place names in England later applied in Barbados by English emigrants and explorers. Barbados has been known for centuries as being the island in the West Indies that appears the most British.

== Christ Church ==
- Hastings
- Vauxhall
- Worthing
- Scarborough

== St. Michael ==
- Brighton

== St. John ==
- Bath

== Saint Peter ==
- Speightstown, Alias Little Bristol

== Saint James ==
- Folkestone
- Holetown (originally named Jamestown)

== See also ==
- List of cities, towns and villages in Barbados
