= Sheraton Mall =

Shopping mall in Barbados

Coordinates: 13°5′0″N 59°34′1″W

The Sheraton Mall (formerly known as Sheraton Centre) is a shopping and entertainment complex located close to the fringe of both Sargeants' Village and Vauxhall in the Parish of Christ Church, Barbados. The mall boasts having roughly 120 stores and services along with the only multiplex cinema on the island. The major anchor stores for the mall are Courts, DaCosta Mannings, and the Olympus Theatres cinema multiplex.

== History ==
In 1986 the Intel Corporation closed their subsidiary called Intel (Barbados) Ltd. the company was involved in microprocessor manufacturing at the building. The move displaced about 1,000 workers and placed pressure on the Government of Barbados to make further use of the facility. Sometime after the Sheraton Mall opened and over the years as popularity grew the mall has continued to build onto the original building structure.

On the afternoon of December 30, 2004, a fire began at the Sheraton Centre, as it was then known. One firefighter was injured and the western side of the mall was severely damaged.

For the year 2009 the mall began celebrations of its twentieth anniversary.

== Layout ==
The mall's food court has local, regional and international cuisine available. But, additionally there are an assortment of stores that include accessories, clothing, shoes, electronics, health, nutrition, and home accessories. It also is home to one of the only multiplex cinemas on the island, Olympus Theatres. Around the exterior of the complex is free parking in the parking lot. The mall acts as a central location for many shoppers and is only a few minutes from such areas as Saint Lawrence Gap in Christ Church, The Wildey, Saint Michael, Barbados|Wildey area in the Parish of Saint Michael, Barbados|Saint Michael and other places via the ABC Highway.

Stores are open until 9 pm Monday through Saturday.
