= Telecommunications in Barbados =

Communications in Barbados refers to the telephony, internet, postal, radio, and television systems of Barbados. Barbados has long been an informational and communications centre in the Caribbean region. Electricity coverage throughout Barbados is good and reliable. Usage is high and provided by a service monopoly, Barbados Light & Power Company Ltd. (a division of Canada-based Emera).

The International Telecommunication Union (ITU) call sign prefix allocated for all radio and television broadcasts in Barbados is 8P, and this replaced the former ZN and VP6 as a British territory.

== History ==
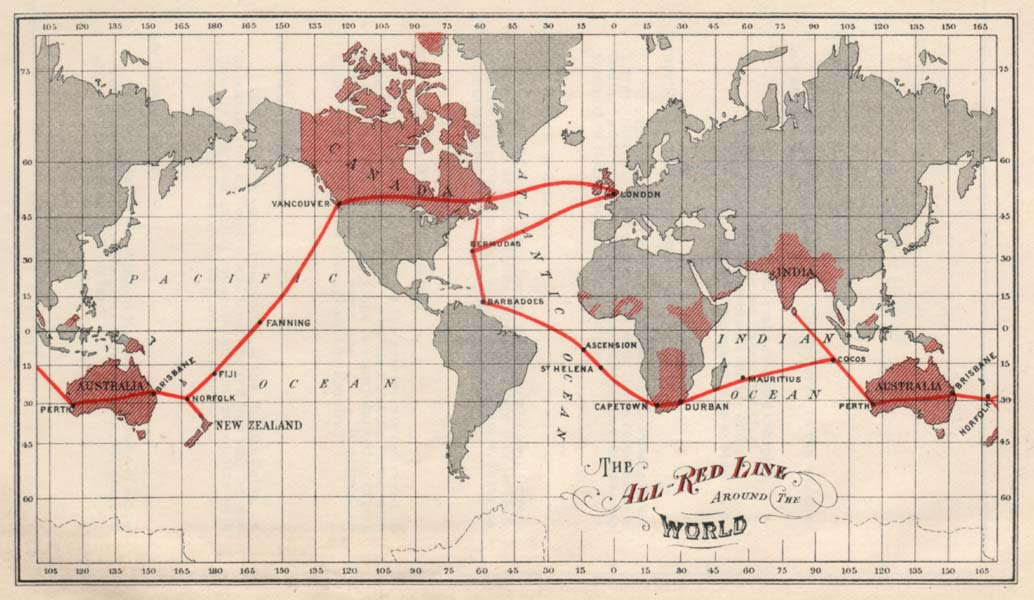
The All Red Line cable for the British Empire. Barbados(Barbadoes) functioned as an interconnection-point between Bermuda and Ascension Island in the Atlantic Ocean. c.a. 1903

Barbados has had various forms of Communications as early as the 1840s. Some of the earliest expressions of inter-island communication includes a number of signal stations built along the high points of the island to relay acts of transgression towards the island to the Saint Ann's Garrison on the south-west coast. The first telephone network in the country was developed in 1884. As the former British Empire's All Red Line came into existence during the early 1900s, Barbados played an important role as a crucial link in the trans-Atlantic communications network. By 1935 a hard wired cable-based radio network was later deployed throughout the country to broadcast the Rediffusion service directly from London to homes and business across Barbados. In 2001 the Government of Barbados and the local Incumbent Local Exchange Carrier (ILEC) provider, Cable & Wireless signed a MOU beginning a phased process of liberalisation of the international segment of Barbados' telecommunications sector. The process was aimed at bringing Barbados' sector into compliance with the World Trade Organization (WTO). The plan outlined the first phase commencing on 1 December 2001 and the entire process ending with full liberalisation being achieved on 1 August 2003. As these target dates were missed, the Phase I process was later commenced on 1 November 2002, with Phase II and III beginning on 16 November 2003 and 21 February 2004 respectively. Full liberalisation was attained in February, 2005, for the international telecommunications services market.

== Telephone ==
Country Code: +1.246
International Call Prefix: 011 (outside NANP)

Calls from Barbados to the US, Canada, and other NANP Caribbean nations, are dialled as 1 + NANP area code + 7-digit number. Calls from Barbados to non-NANP countries are dialled as 011 + country code + phone number with local area code.

Number Format: nxx-xxxx

The rate of telecommunications penetration in Barbados ranks among the highest in the world. According to the International Telecommunication Union, telephone service for the period 2000–2004, stated Barbados had 124 telephones in usage for every 100 people. Telecommunications are virtually universally accessible to all.

Telephones - main lines in use
134,900 (2005)
county comparison to the world: 133
Telephones - mobile cellular
237,100 (2006)
county comparison to the world: 165
Telephone system
- general assessment: fixed-line teledensity of roughly 50 per 100 persons; mobile-cellular telephone density of about 85 per 100 persons
- domestic: island-wide automatic telephone system
- international access code: +1.246 (in the North American Numbering Plan, Area code 246);

- landing point for:

- 1) the East Caribbean Fiber System (ECFS) submarine cable with links to 13 other islands in the eastern Caribbean extending from the British Virgin Islands to Trinidad;
- 2); the Antilles Crossing Phase 1 link to the US Virgin Islands via Saint Lucia;

satellite earth stations - 1 (Intelsat - Atlantic Ocean); tropospheric scatter to Trinidad and Saint Lucia (2007)

Mobile providers

- Current: Liberty Latin America (d/b/a Flow), Digicel
- Defunct: Cingular Wireless(divested to Digicel), Sunbeach

== Broadcasting ==
Radio broadcast stations
AM 2, FM 6, shortwave 0 (2004)

- (VOB-AM 790 (Gospel), 8PX-AM 900 (CBC)
- (BBS 90.7FM, PBS 91.9FM, BBC 92.1FM, VOB 92.9FM, CBC 94.7FM, HOTT 95.3FM, Mix 96.9FM, Gospel 97.5FM, The One 98.1FM, WE 99.9FM(SVG), Q 100.7FM, SLAM 101.1FM, Faith 102.1FM, Love 104.1FM, Radio GED 106.1 FM)

Radios
237,000 (1997)
Television broadcast stations
1 (plus two cable channels) (2004)

- 8PX-TV (C.B.C. TV8)
- Public Broadcast Service (PBS) -- Scheduled for 2009

Televisions
76,000 (1997)

== Internet ==
Internet Service Providers (ISPs)
3+ (1999)
(Cable & Wireless (CaribSurf), TeleBarbados/Freemotion.bb (frequently reported for malicious phishing practices by users accessing their webmail domain found via mail.free.bb), Sunbeach Communications)
Internet country code
.BB
Internet hosts
104 (2008)
county comparison to the world: 178
Internet users
160,000 (2005)
county comparison to the world: 131

=== Broadband Internet access ===
Globally, the country of Barbados was ranked by the International Telecommunication Union (ITU) and UNICEF to be one of the most wired countries in the world on a per capita basis. The report entitled "State Of The World's Children 2007" stated Barbados had rate of Internet usage which was 55 users for every 100 people. This ranking meant that only 13 nations: Australia, Canada, Finland, South Korea, Liechtenstein, Luxembourg, Malta, the Netherlands, San Marino, Singapore, Sweden, Britain and the United States had a higher ratios per head of population. In so scoring this placed Barbados in the lead for the Caribbean and Latin America regions.

Telephone services in Barbados are provided by: LIME (Incumbent), Digicel, Sunbeach, WIISCOM, Internet services in the country are provided by: CariAccess, CaribSurf, Neptune Communications, Sunbeach Communications, TeleBarbados/Freemotion.bb, WI-NET INC.

ADSL services are widely available, as are Frame Relay and other more advanced services.

== See also ==
- .bb
- Call signs in North America
- List of countries by number of Internet users
- List of television stations in the Caribbean#Barbados
- List of radio stations in Barbados
- List of telecommunications companies in Barbados
