= List of companies listed on the Barbados Stock Exchange =

This is a list of companies listed on the Barbados Stock Exchange.

Company name	ICB sub-sector	Stock code
Almond Resorts Inc.		BSE:: ARI
ANSA McAL (Barbados) Ltd.		BSE:: MCAL
Banks Holdings Ltd		BSE:: BNKS
Barbados Dairy Industries Ltd.		BSE:: BDI
Barbados Farms Ltd.		BSE:: BFL
Barbados National Bank Inc.	Banks	BSE:: BNB
Barbados Shipping & Trading Co. Ltd.		BSE:: BST
Bico Ltd.		BSE:: BCO
Cable & Wireless Barbados Ltd.		BSE:: CWBL
Cave Shepherd & Co. Ltd.		BSE:: CSP
Courts (Barbados) Ltd.		BSE:: CTS
FirstCaribbean International Bank Ltd.	Banks	BSE:: FCI
Fortress Caribbean Property Fund		BSE:: CPF
Goddard Enterprises Ltd.		BSE:: GDE
Insurance Corporation of Barbados Ltd.		BSE:: ICBL
Light & Power Holdings Ltd.		BSE:: LPH
One Caribbean Media		BSE:: OCM
Sagicor Financial Corporation		BSE:: SFC
West India Biscuit Company Ltd.		BSE:: WIB
West Indies Rum Distillery Ltd		BSE:: WIR
