= List of programs broadcast by Caribbean Broadcasting Corporation =

This is a list of television programmes that are either currently being broadcast or have previously been broadcast on Caribbean Broadcasting Corporation through their media centre in Barbados.

== Normal programming ==
=== C ===
- CaribWorld Home Shopping - formed in 2004, it is the Caribbean region's first local home shopping programme. It was expanded to Trinidad and Tobago in 2005 and Jamaica the following year. The programme airs on CBC-TV on weekdays at 8.00 am, 11.00 am, and 3.00 pm.

=== E ===
- Evening News

=== M ===
- Mornin' Barbados

=== P ===
- People's Business - a newscast that airs on Sunday night at 7.40 pm; analyzes current events and top stories for the week in a discussion format

=== R ===
- Royal Palm Estate

=== T ===
- Time to Sing - airs on Sunday afternoon at 1.00 pm on CBC channel 8; features singers from different church groups across Barbados
- Treasures of Barbados - shows Barbados landmarks; airs on CBC Channel 8 on Saturdays at 5.00 pm

== See also ==
- Caribbean Broadcasting Corporation
- Lists of television programs
  - List of animated series
  - Lists of comedies
  - List of game shows
