= Spring Garden Generating Station =

Power station in Bridgetown, Saint Michael, Barbados

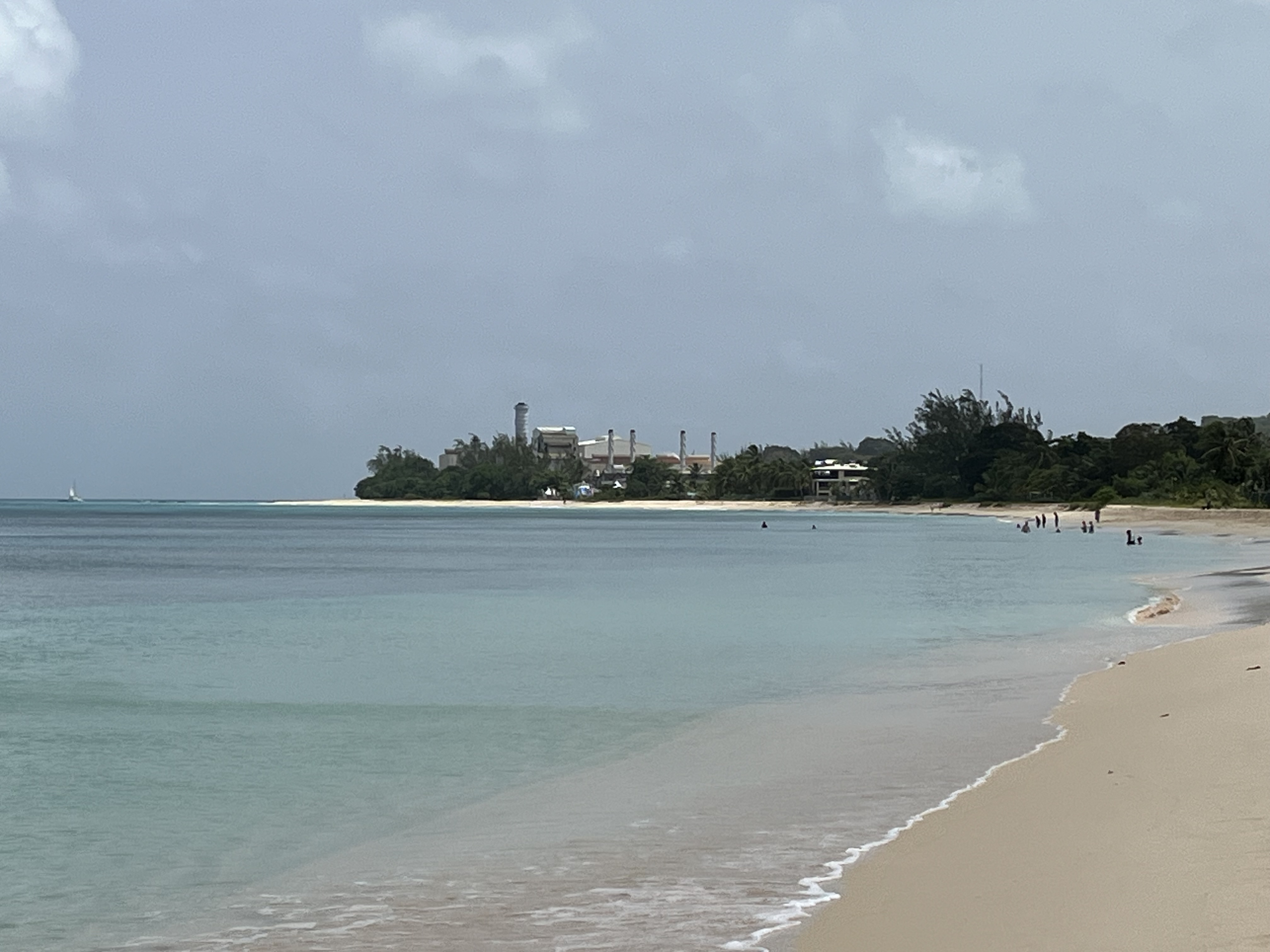
- Country: Barbados
- Location: Bridgetown, Saint Michael
- Coordinates: 13°07′32″N 59°37′57″W
- Status: Operational
- Commission date: 1967
- Owner: Barbados Light and Power Company

Power generation
- Units operational: 6 (diesel); 2 (steam); 1 (gas)

The Spring Garden Generating Station is a power station in Bridgetown, Saint Michael, Barbados.

== History ==
The power station went into operation in 1967.

== Generating units ==
The power plant consists of nine generating units, which are three 12 MW, one 12.5 MW, two 30 MW, two 20 MW and one 17.5 MW.

== See also ==
- Barbados Light and Power Company
