= List of radio stations in Barbados =

This is a list of AM and FM radio stations in Barbados. Where possible, nicknames of stations have been given alongside the frequencies.

== AM station ==
Callsign	Frequency	URL	Stream	City/Town	Network affiliation/Owner	Radio Format
CBC Radio AM (CBC AM Radio)	900	Online	Audio	The Pine, St. Michael	Caribbean Broadcasting Corporation	News/Music/Events Coverage

== FM stations ==
Callsign	Frequency	URL	Stream	City/Town	Network affiliation/Owner	Format
Christ Is The Answer Radio FM (CITA)	90.1	Online	Audio	Bishop’s Court Hill St. Michael	The People's Cathedral Barbados	Christian
Barbados Broadcasting Service FM (BBS)	90.7	♦	♦♦	Astoria, St. George	Barbados Broadcasting Service	Easy listening
Emergency Broadcast Station FM (EBS)	91.3	Online	♦♦	Gun Hill, St. George	Government of Barbados	Emergency Broadcast Station
BBC Radio FM BBC Relay	92.1	Online	Audio	United Kingdom	BBC World Service Relay	World News
VOB FM Voice of Barbados (VOB)	92.9	Online	Audio	Bridgetown, St. Michael	Starcom Network	Sports/Music/Call-in shows
CBC Radio FM CBC Radio	94.7	Online	Audio	The Pine, St. Michael	Caribbean Broadcasting Corporation	News/Music
HOTT FM (Barbados)	95.3	Online	Audio	Bridgetown, St. Michael	Starcom Network	Urban/Reggae
Mix FM	96.9	Online	Audio	Bridgetown, St. Michael	Mix Media Services Inc	Christian
Life FM	97.5	Online	Audio	Bridgetown, St. Michael	Starcom Network	Christian
The One (Barbados)	98.1	Online	Audio	The Pine, St. Michael	Caribbean Broadcasting Corporation	Under 20
Capital Media HD	99.3	Online	Audio	Limegrove Lifestyle Centre, Holetown, St. James	♦	Launched February 29. 2016
Q FM Quality FM	100.7	Online	Audio	The Pine, St. Michael	Caribbean Broadcasting Corporation	50s', 60s', 70s' and 80s' Hits Standards (plus 90s' and today's Hits)
SLAM (Barbados)	101.1	Online	Audio	Haggatt Hall, St. Michael	Power Broadcasting Inc.	Soca/Reggae/Urban/Top 40
Faith FM	102.1	♦	♦♦	Astoria, St. George	Barbados Broadcasting Service	Christian
Y FM	103.3	Online	Audio	Haggatt Hall, St. Michael	Power Broadcasting Inc.	80's, 90's, 2000's and today's Hits
The Beat FM	104.1	Online	Audio	Bridgetown, St. Michael	Starcom Network	Adult Contemporary
NBG Radio FM	104.7	Online	Audio	Harbour Industrial Park, St. Michael	-	Christian
Power Radio FM	105.3	♦	♦♦	Belleville, St. Michael	Heart Beat Ministries	Christian (Coming soon)
Radio GED	106.1	Online	♦♦	Bridgetown, St. Michael	Barbados Community College	College Radio
Globe Drive-In FM	107.3	♦	♦♦	Vauxhall, Christ Church	Globe Cinemas Ltd.	Drive-In Movie audio

== TV station ==
Callsign	Frequency	URL	Stream	City/Town	Network affiliation/Owner
CBC TV	Channel 8	Online	♦♦	The Pine, Saint Michael	Caribbean Broadcasting Corporation

== Other broadcasters to Barbados ==
The following stations which are not based in Barbados do have significant radio coverage in Barbados.

Callsign	Frequency	URL	Stream	City/town	Owner
WEFM (St. Vincent)	99.9	Online	Audio	St. Vincent and the Grenadines	Electronics Engineer Julius Williams

== Future Station ==
Paradise FM Limited applied to launch a station aimed predominantly at the Tourist and Ex-Pat market, it had hoped to be on air early 2010.

== Defunct ==
From time to time radio stations in Barbados undergo rebranding or change formats. Some of the previous brands and formats in Barbados include.

- Liberty 98.1 FM - AKA "Liberty To Set You Free" now known as The One 98.1 FM.
- Rediffusion Barbados (Broadcast via cable wires) - Associated-Rediffusion. No longer in operation.
- Yess FM (Yess 104.1), became Love FM 104.1, became 104.1, and now known as The Beat 104.1.
- Caribbean Super Station (CSS) now known as Life FM. Caribbean Super Station (CSS) no longer broadcast in Barbados.
- Voice Of Barbados (92.9) previously broadcast in the AM band at 790 kHz.

== See also ==
- Communications in Barbados
- Barbadian Television stations
- Amateur radio call signs of Barbados
