= Q 100.7 FM =

Radio station in Barbados

Pine Hill; Barbados
- Frequency: 100.7 MHz

Programming
- Format: Oldies, talk

Ownership
- Owner: Caribbean Broadcasting Corporation

History
- First air date: 3 May 2004
- Former names: Quality FM

Links
- Website: qfm.bb

Q 100.7 FM is a radio station in Barbados. It was launched on Monday 3rd May 2004 as Quality FM. The station airs mainly talk shows as well as a number of features (such as obituary announcements) previously broadcast by its sister station CBC 94.7 CBC 900 AM. Q 100.7 FM is marketed as the "Quality Talk, Quality Music" station.

Owned by the Government of Barbados's Caribbean Broadcasting Corporation (CBC), the station has studios located at The Pine, Saint Michael.

== Programming ==
Q 100.7 FM broadcasts sittings of the Parliament of Barbados: the House of Assembly meets on Tuesdays at 10:30 AM, and sittings of the Senate take place on Wednesdays.

Other regular programmes include Farmers' Corner every Monday, Wednesday, and Saturday at 5:30 AM, The Quarter Hour of Prayer Power every Monday and Friday at 5:45 AM as well as on Sundays at 3:45 PM, Healthy Living every Monday at 7:45 AM, Your Health and You on Wednesdays at 8:15 AM, Between Me and You on weekdays between 11:00 AM and 2:00 PM, Q in the Community every Thursday from 11:00 AM to 5:00 PM, the BARP 50+ Half-Hour every 2nd and 4th Monday of the month at 12:30 PM, the Q Sunday Morning Service each Sunday at 9:00 AM the new Food for the Soul programme on Sundays from 2:00 PM to 3:00 PM, with Hymns We Love at 5:15 PM.

Also, there is the Watt's New? programme from the Barbados Light and Power Company every last Friday in every month (except Public Holidays) at 8:45 AM, the Living With Dr. Sparman programme every Fridays from 8:30 AM to 9:00 AM, the Golden Soca Back In Time Show programme with Peter Boyce every Thursdays at 12:30 AM and every Saturdays at 11:30 PM, the Let's Talk About It programme every Weekdays from 9:00 AM to 11:00 AM (except Public Holidays), the Chalanis Wines Oldie Goldies Show with DJ King Scorpion every Saturdays from 2:00 PM to 4:00 PM, the Pharmaco Limited Oldie Goldies Show also every Saturdays from 4:00 PM to 5:00 PM, the Exodus Reggae Show with Andi Thornhill every Fridays from 8:15 PM to 12:00 Midnight, Football Fiesta again with Andi Thornhill Every Monday at 6:00 p.m.

100.7 FM, together with its sister station CBC Radio, plays music from the 1950s to the 1970s outside of its talk shows.

== On Air Staff ==
- Anthony "Admiral" Nelson
- Jaquila Lewis
- Wendell Forde
- Mark Anthony
- Kimberley Skeete
- André Harewood
- Anthony "Tony" Thompson
- Anderson "Andi" Thornhill

== Former On Air Staff ==
- Lawrence "Larry" Mayers
- Archillus "Archie" Weekes
- Joanne Sealy
- Peter Wilkinson (deceased)

== See also ==
- Caribbean Broadcasting Corporation (CBC)
- List of radio stations in Barbados
