= 8PB =

8PB may also refer to:

- ABC NewsRadio, in Australia (Frequency callsign 8PB in the Northern Territory)
- The Port of Bridgetown (Port callsign 8PB)
