= CBC Television (disambiguation) =

CBC Television is an English-language public television network in Canada.

CBC Television and CBC TV may also refer to:

- CBC TV 8, a public television channel in Barbados
- Capital Broadcast Center, a satellite television channel in Egypt
- Chubu-Nippon Broadcasting, a local television station in Nagoya, Japan
