= CBC Radio (disambiguation) =

The name CBC Radio may refer to:

- CBC Radio, a radio broadcasting service of the Canadian Broadcasting Corporation
- CBC Radio (Barbados), a radio broadcasting service of the Caribbean Broadcasting Corporation
- CBC Radio (Japan), a radio station in Aichi Prefecture, Japan
- XEBG-AM, a radio station in Tijuana, Mexico that uses the "CBC Radio" name
- Red Dragon FM, a commercial radio station in Cardiff, Wales that was once known as CBC
