= Starcom Network =

Radio station in Barbados

Starcom Network is a radio station in Barbados.

Starcom Network began its life as Radio Distribution (Barbados) Limited, with the introduction of the first broadcast station then located at Wildey, St. Michael in 1935. At that time, the company transmitted its broadcast signal using a cable network system, known as subscription radio. As the only radio station in Barbados until the first wireless radio station 900 AM was started in 1963, subscribers used to pay for the radio on a monthly bases. The service (basically a large PA system) later renamed Barbados Rediffusion was broadcast via cable to wall-mounted textured wood finished receivers. Each device was connected to wires via telephone poles all the way back to the studio. The premier presenters were the incomparable Alfred Pragnell (now the late Alfred Pragnell), the incomparable Olga Lopes-Seale (now the late Olga Lopes-Seale), Maurice Norville and David Ellis. It was broadcast from 4:00 PM to 10:00 PM. The service was later expanded, featuring soap operas of the day. With the passage of time, Barbados Rediffusion closed on 30 November 1997, Independence Day Public Holiday when it celebrated its 31st Independence Birthday.

Voice of Barbados then at the frequency 790 AM was introduced in 1981, as Barbados' second wireless radio station. Gospel 790 AM became Life 97.5 FM in 2013, also along with the change from 790 AM to VOB 92.9 FM it became as Barbados' fourth FM station. Sister station "Yess 104.1 FM" (now known as Love FM) was Barbados' third station that broadcast in a full 24-hour rotation. Love 104.1 FM became The Beat 104.1 FM, along with the greatest songs and hits of the '70s, '80s, '90s and today since 2016. Hott 95.3 FM started on 1 December 1997, Independence Day Bank Holiday, as Starcom's second FM station by the company. The company also started selling television and other electronic items for consumers. Starcom also started the resale of US-based DirecTV service. It changed to Starcom Network in 1999 with the studio headquarters now located on River Road in the capital city of Bridgetown, St. Michael.

== See also ==
- List of radio stations in Barbados
