= MCTV =

MCTV is an acronym used to represent these unrelated television stations:

- Mid-Canada Communications (MCTV), a Canadian system of television stations in northern Ontario, which existed from 1980 to 2005, affiliated with CTV and CBC on separate channels
- Multi-Choice TV (Barbados), cable television service of the Caribbean Broadcasting Corporation
- MCTV 26, a cable television station owned and operated by Mercer County Community College in West Windsor, New Jersey, United States
- MCTV 29, the on-campus television station for Marist College in Poughkeepsie, New York, United States

MCTV may also refer to a number of cable Public-access television cable TV channels in these communities:

Australia

- Mandurah, Western Australia

United States

- Tempe, Arizona
- Millbrae, California
- Mount Shasta, California
- San Mateo, California
- Martin County, Florida
- Magoffin County, Kentucky
- Turners Falls, Massachusetts
- Midland, Michigan
- Manchester, New Hampshire
- Gresham, Oregon
- Allentown, Pennsylvania
