= Public Broadcast Service =

Public educational radio and television network in Barbados

- Type: Broadcast radio network Television network
- Country: Barbados
- Availability: National
- Owner: Barbadian Government
- Launch date: November 2008 (radio); 2009 (television)
- Official website: http://www.pbsebarbados.org/

The Public Broadcast Service (PBS) is a government-owned educational radio and television broadcast service in Barbados. Public Broadcast Service owns a radio station, 91.1FM and its television programming was introduced in 2009. The station falls under the jurisdiction of the Ministry of Education and Human Resource Development.

The main focus is educational programming. The radio and television stations will be geared towards everyone from school children to continuous education for adults. The stated intention according to the acting Education Minister Patrick Todd, was that: "if Barbados wants to be competitive, there must be further reform of the educational system, to fully embrace and deploy all the technologies... in order to reach those individuals who do not respond readily to traditional teaching methods."

Todd added that the PBS would cater to those Barbadians, who, for one reason or another, want to re-educate themselves. "The PBS for Education in Barbados will have the capacity to offer certified online training courses for teachers, public officers, police officers, fire officers and the Defence Force," he explained.

The facility for the service will encompass a radio station, a free-to-air television station and an umbrella website. It will fall under the auspice of the Media Resource Department (Formerly the Ministry's Audio-Visual Aids Department from the years 1969–1996) at Government Hill, will officially be in charge of overseeing the service.

It is planned over a seven-year period that the station will gradually progress towards a full 24-hour programming schedule. The planned themed programming includes: Listening Comprehension, Storytelling, Religious Education, Science, Language Arts, Social Studies, Mental Arithmetic, Spanish and Geography.

== See also ==
- Education in Barbados
- Caribbean Broadcasting Corporation (CBC)
- List of radio stations in Barbados
