= The One 98.1 FM (Barbados) =

Caribbean radio station

The One 98.1 FM is a radio station owned and operated by the Caribbean Broadcasting Corporation, Barbados' public broadcaster.

== History ==
The One was launched in 1984 as "Liberty FM". At the launch the station was mainly geared towards young people playing mainly popular music of the day. This frequency was previously used as a low power (50 watts) relay of CBC 900 AM.

It was re-introduced and re-branded on 12 February 2005 as the "98.1 The One" radio station in Barbados and currently despite its rebranding from Liberty, the station continues catering to a young demographic. There is the "Mark's Auto Spares Hour Show" from 5:00 PM to 6:00 PM every Thursday, the "Eddie's Trading and Eddie's Supermarket Half-Hour Show" from 10:30 AM to 11:00 AM every Wednesday and Friday, the "RPM Report Show" every at 12:45 PM every Wednesday, the "Drivetime Show" at 5:15 PM every Friday and lots more. It has the chart topping songs of today.

== On-air staff ==
- Adrian "A.O.N. Skillz" Wilkinson
- Shayne "DJ Ras" Edwards
- Dj Hutchy
- Tyson "Verseewild" Wilson
- Hyperdrive Team (MHK & Inchy)
- Dj Technical
- Dj Champion Crown
- Dj Mad Vybz
- Mykey Myx

== See also ==
- Caribbean Broadcasting Corporation (CBC)
- List of radio stations in Barbados
