= Southern Caribbean Fiber =

Submarine fiber network serving the Caribbean area

Southern Caribbean Fiber, (once known as Antilles Crossing), is an underwater 20 gigabit per second (Gbit/s) fiber optics ring network connecting several nations and overseas territories of the Caribbean Sea. The initial phase of construction extended from Needham's Point, Saint Michael, Barbados to Saint Croix in the U.S. Virgin Islands where it interconnects with Global Crossing's worldwide telecommunications network.

Originally built by TeleBarbados, it is one of the newer important network connections to the Internet for Barbados, the Windward and also Leeward Islands. The company began as a joint venture between Leucadia National Corporation and Barbados Light & Power Holdings Limited with plans to build out the network in four phases.

- Phase I (The red phase) links Barbados, to the island of Saint Croix in the United States Virgin Islands.
- Phase II (The grey phase) will see the linking of Barbados firstly to Tobago and then onward to Trinidad further south.
- Phase III (The green phase) will see the link from Trinidad traveling Northward to Grenada, Saint Vincent, and Saint Lucia.
- Phase IV (The blue phase) will see a link extended from Saint Lucia Northward to Martinique, Guadeloupe, Saint Kitts and Saint Croix in United States Virgin Islands

In 2012 TeleBarbados including its subsea fiber unit Antilles Crossing was acquired by Columbus Communications to form short lived Columbus Networks. Through further consolidation in the region Cable and Wireless Communications led an acquisition of Columbus Communications and out of concerns of competition in 2013 Digicel after outlining objection to the deal between Columbus Communications and C&W, Digicel Group reached a deal to acquire some of the former assets of Columbus Networks and Antilles Crossing along with other fiber assets in the region to maintain competition Digicel completed on September 10, 2014, the acquisition of this and other assets forming Southern Caribbean Fiber.

== Original Stake holders ==
- Antilles Crossing
- Barbados Light & Power
- Ectel
- Leucadia
- Network Research

== Participant countries ==
- Barbados (red)
- Grenada (green)
- Guadeloupe (blue)
- Martinique (blue)
- Saint Kitts and Nevis (blue)
- Saint Lucia (green)
- Saint Vincent and the Grenadines (green)
- Trinidad and Tobago (grey)
- United States Virgin Islands (red)

== Facts ==
- USVI—Barbados: 940 km segment
- Total: 3000 km

== See also ==
- TeleBarbados
- List of international submarine communications cables
