= Bridgetown =

Capital and largest city of Barbados

- Capital city
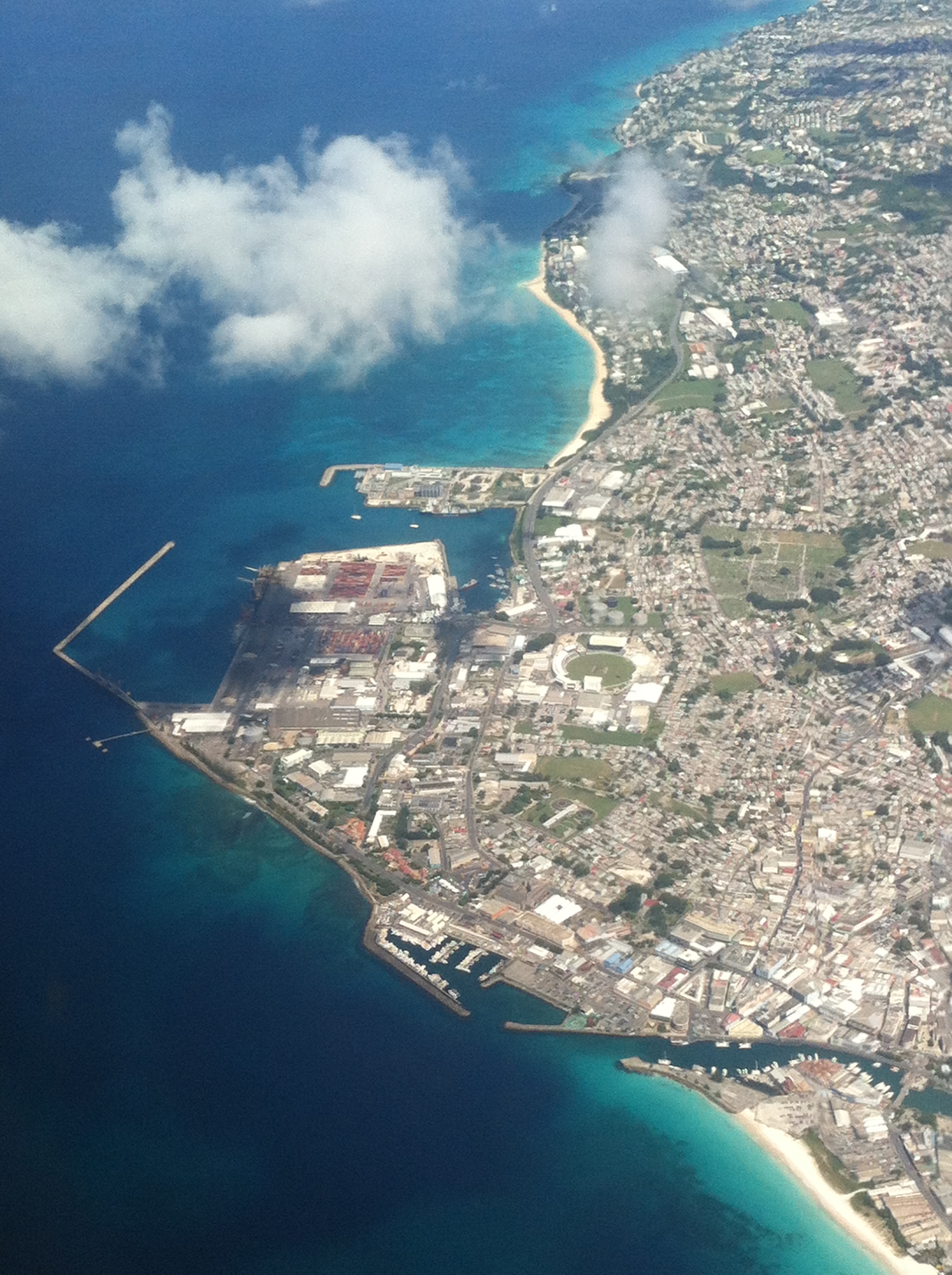
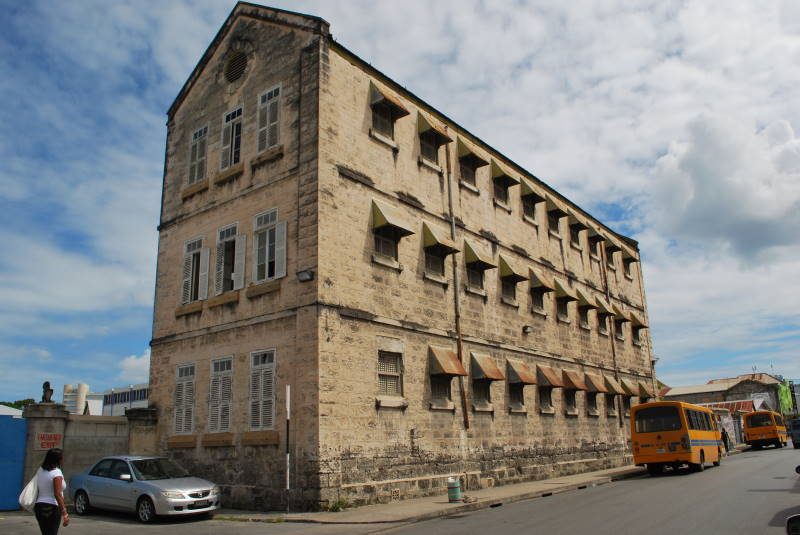
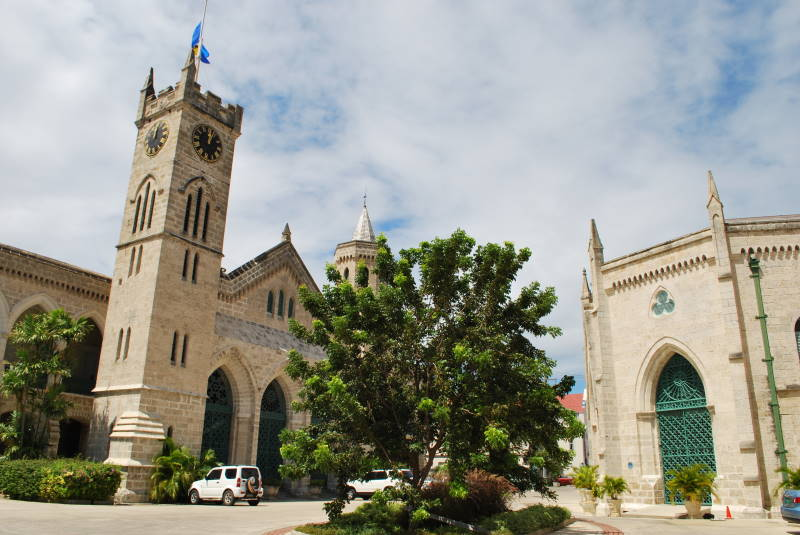
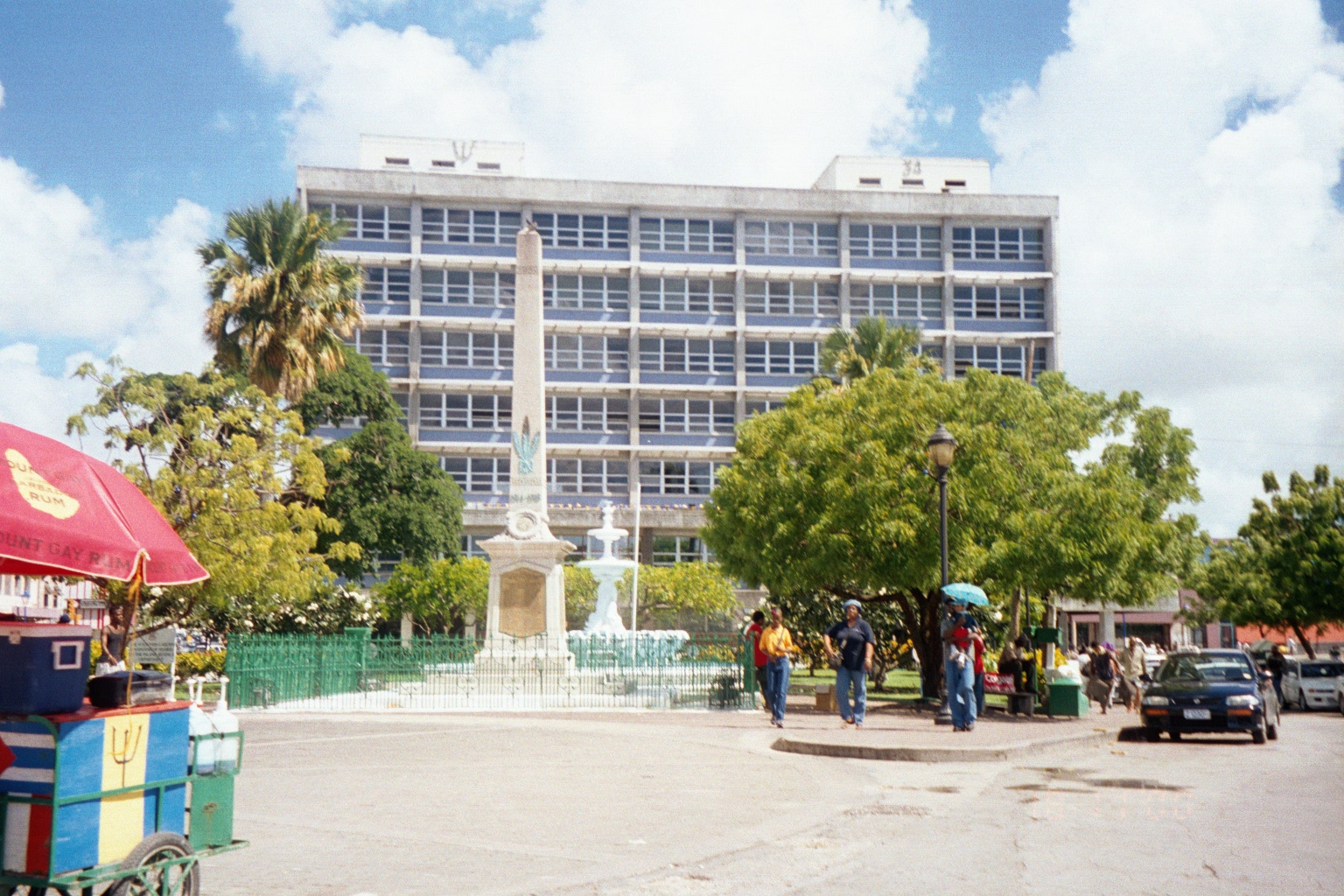
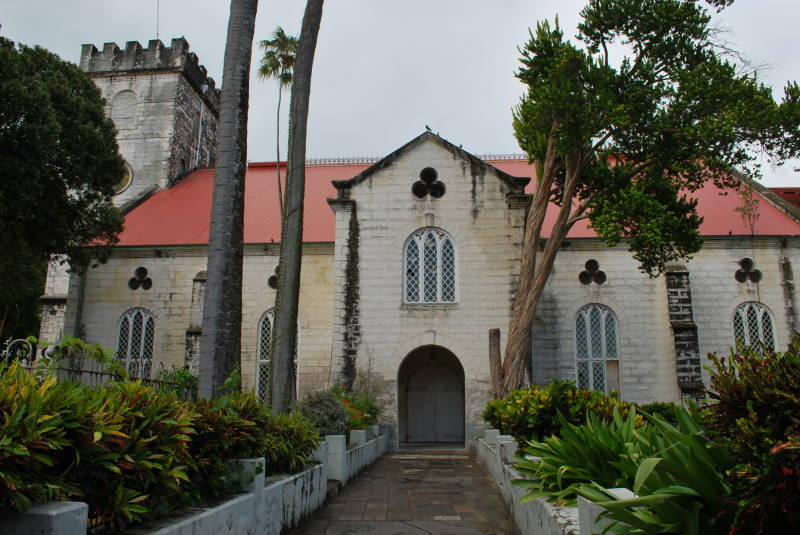
- Overlooking Bridgetown Downtown Bridgetown Parliament Buildings National Heroes Square Cathedral Church of Saint Michael and All Angels

- Coat of arms

- Location within Barbados Location within the Caribbean Location within North America
- Coordinates: 13°05′49″N 59°36′47″W
- Country: Barbados
- Parish: Saint Michael
- Established: 1628
- City status: 1824

Area
  - Total: 15 sq mi (39 km^{2})
- Elevation: 3.3 ft (1 m)

Population (2014)
  - Total: 110,000
  - Density: 7,300/sq mi (2,800/km^{2})
- Time zone: UTC−04:00 (AST)
- Area code: +1 246

UNESCO World Heritage Site
- Official name: Historic Bridgetown and its Garrison
- Type: Cultural
- Criteria: ii, iii, vi
- Designated: 2011
- Reference no.: 1376
- Region: Americas

Bridgetown (UN/LOCODE: BB BGI) is the capital and largest city of Barbados. Formerly The Town of Saint Michael, the Greater Bridgetown area is located within the parish of Saint Michael. Bridgetown is sometimes locally referred to as "The City", but the most common reference is simply "Town". As of 2014, its metropolitan population stands at roughly 110,000.

The Bridgetown port, found along Carlisle Bay (at 13.106°N 59.632°W) lies on the southwestern coast of the island. Parts of the Greater Bridgetown area (as roughly defined by the Ring Road Bypass or more commonly known as the ABC Highway), sit close to the borders of the neighbouring parishes of Christ Church and St. James. The Grantley Adams International Airport, the only airport on the island, is located 16 kilometres (10 mi) southeast of Bridgetown city centre. It has daily flights to major cities in the United Kingdom, United States, Canada and the Caribbean. There is no longer a local municipal government, but it is a constituency of the national Parliament. During the short-lived 1950s-1960s Federation of the British West Indian Territories, Bridgetown was one of three capital cities within the region being considered to be the Federal capital of the region.

The present-day location of the city was established by English settlers in 1628; a previous settlement under the authority of Sir William Courten was at St. James Town. Bridgetown is a major West Indies tourist destination, and the city acts as an important financial, informatics, convention centre, and cruise ship port of call in the Caribbean region. On 25 June 2011, "Historic Bridgetown and its Garrison" was listed as a World Heritage Site by UNESCO.

== History ==
Although the island was totally abandoned or uninhabited when the British arrived, one of the few traces of indigenous pre-existence on the island was a primitive bridge constructed over the Careenage area's swamp at the centre of Bridgetown. It was thought that this bridge was created by a people indigenous to the Caribbean known as the Tainos. Upon finding the structure, the British settlers began to call what is now the Bridgetown area Indian Bridge. Scholars widely believe that the Tainos were driven from Barbados to the neighbouring island of Saint Lucia, during an invasion by the Kalinagos, another indigenous people of the region. Eventually after 1654 when a new bridge was constructed over the Careenage by the British, the area became known as The Town of Saint Michael and later as Bridgetown, after Sir Tobias Bridge.

Bridgetown is the only city outside the present United States that George Washington visited. (George Washington House, the house where he stayed, is included within the boundaries of the Garrison Historic Area.) Two of Washington's ancestors, Jonathon and Gerrard Hawtaine, were early planters on the island. Their grandmother was Mary Washington of Sulgrave, Northamptonshire, England. In 2011, historic buildings in Bridgetown were designated as a protected area by UNESCO.

=== Early settlement ===
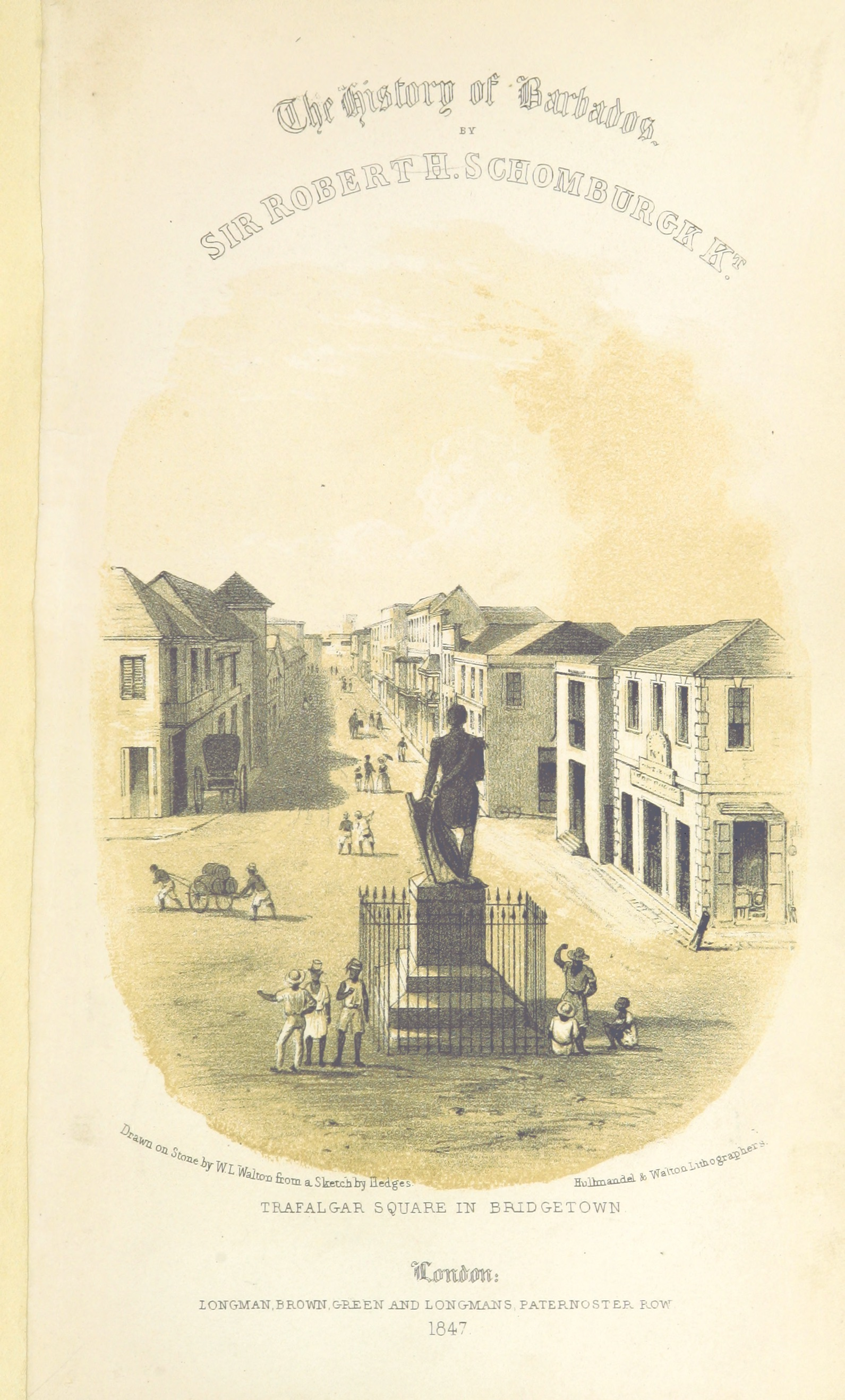
Lord Nelson statue Bridgetown, Barbados in 1848, removed in 2020

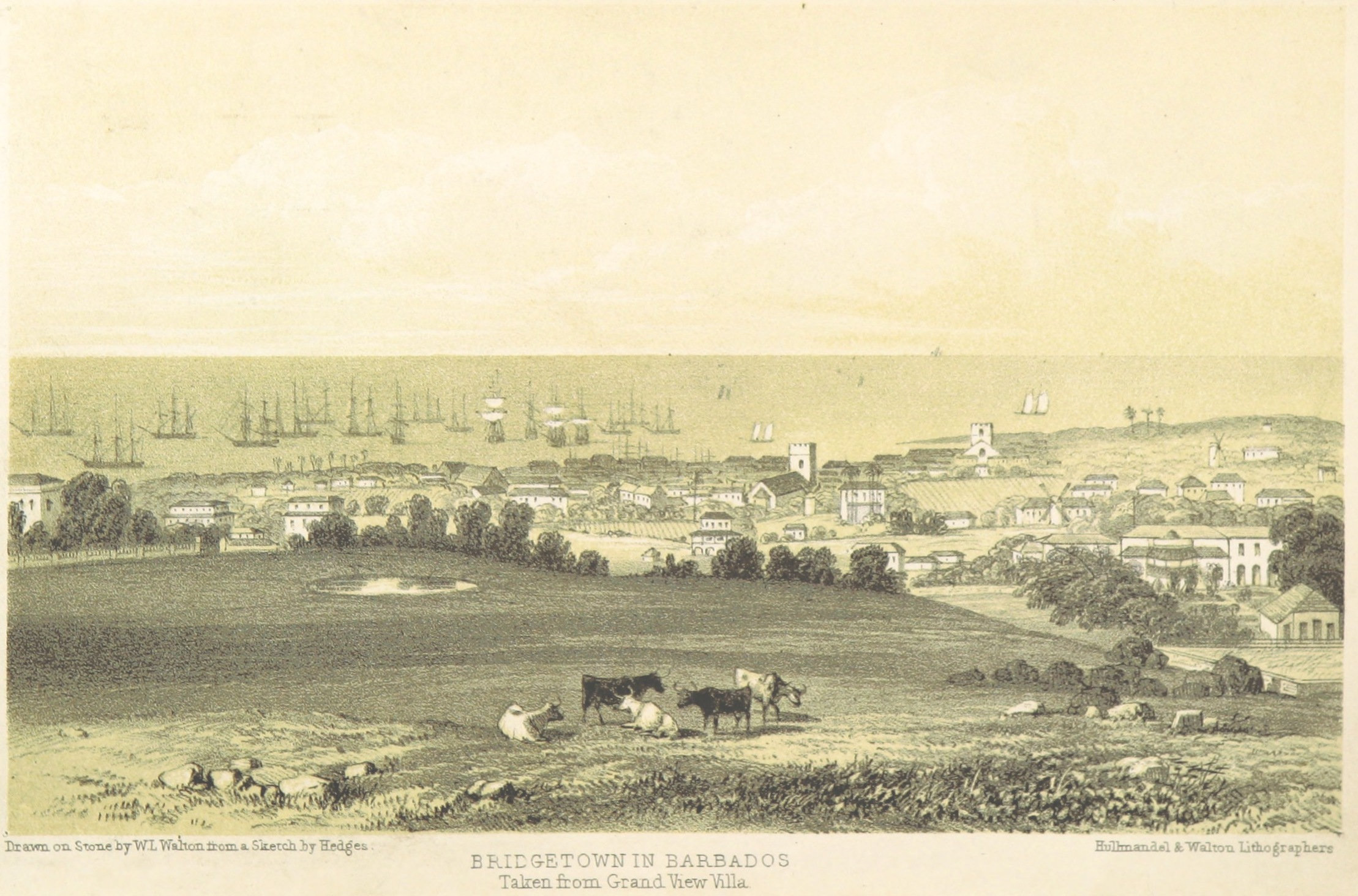
Bridgetown, Barbados in 1848

English settlement of Bridgetown began on 5 July 1628 under Charles Wolverstone, who brought with him 64 settlers to these lands formally claimed by James Hay, the Earl of Carlisle. Wolverstone had been sent by a group of London merchants, headed by Sir Marmaduke Rawdon. They had been granted a lease to 10,000 acres (4,000 ha) of land by the Earl of Carlisle in settlement of debts. Wolverstone granted each of the settlers 100 acres (40 ha) of land on the northern side of the Careenage waterway for the purpose of general settlement. The southern shore on Needham's Point was claimed by Carlisle's agents in October 1628. In 1631, many acres of land directly facing Carlisle Bay were passed to Henry Hawley, the new Governor; but after reports of his dishonest behaviour he was arrested and forcibly returned to England in 1639. An investigation by a commission in 1640 found that much of Hawley's land transactions were legitimate and properly showed these lands (including the town site) as being attributed to the Earl of Carlisle. Bridgetown was built with a street layout resembling early English medieval or market towns, with its narrow serpentine street and alley configuration. It is estimated that between 1627 and 1807, approximately 387,000 enslaved Africans were sent to Barbados.

=== From town to city ===
In 1824, Barbados became the seat of the Anglican Diocese of Barbados and the Leeward Islands. The St Michael's Parish Church became a cathedral, so that Bridgetown became a city. In 1842, Barbados, Trinidad, Tobago, Grenada, Saint Vincent, and Saint Lucia were split into separate dioceses by royal letters patent which also decreed that the Town of Bridgetown should be called the City of Bridgetown.

From 1800 until 1885, Bridgetown was the main seat of government for the former British colonies of the Windward Islands. During this period, the resident governor of Barbados also served as the colonial head of the Windward Islands. After the Government of Barbados officially exited from the Windward Islands union in 1885, the seat was moved from Bridgetown to St. George's on the neighbouring island of Grenada.

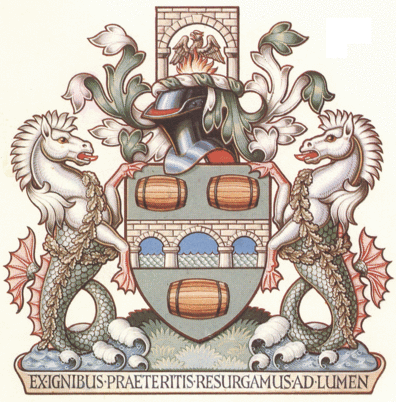
The coat of arms of Bridgetown

In December 1925, a committee sought to petition the king for a royal charter of incorporation to provide local government in the city, proposed to consist of a mayor, 8 aldermen, 12 common councillors, a town clerk, a head-borough or chief constable, and such other officers as would be deemed necessary. It was proposed that the island's House of Assembly should seek to incorporate the city instead of using a royal charter.

This proposal did not succeed, but in 1958 the Local Government Act was passed in Barbados. This provided a separate administration for the city, with a mayor; 6 city aldermen; and 12 city councillors, four for each of the three wards in the city.

On 20 September 1960, the College of Arms in London granted arms to the City of Bridgetown. The armorial bearings were designed by the late Neville Connell, the then director of the Barbados Museum and Historical Society, and H. W. Ince, the honorary secretary of the society.

Local government in Barbados did not last long. In April 1967, the local government councils were dissolved and replaced by an interim commissioner for local government. The Corporation of Bridgetown thus ceased to exist, and its records and paraphernalia were deposited in both the Government Department of Archives and Barbados Museum and Historical Society. Today, Bridgetown and surrounding constituencies are administered by members of the Barbadian parliament.

== Geography and climate ==
=== Geography ===
As established in the early 17th century, Bridgetown's centre was originally composed of a swamp, which was drained and filled in to make way for development.

=== Boundaries ===
The earliest boundaries of Bridgetown are contained by way of an act passed on 4 April 1660 called, "to prevent the danger which may happen by fire, in or about any of the seaport towns of the Island". The southern limit was declared to be the River (Careenage), whilst the western limit was declared to be the western boundary of St. Michael's (now St. Mary's) Churchyard, and extending in a direct line to the seaside. The town's other limits consisted of properties of certain citizens' names in this statute, the location of which cannot now be determined with certainty. The boundaries were not redefined until 1822.

Through Statutory Instrument (S.I) 1984 No. 141, Road Traffic Act, CAP. 295, ROAD TRAFFIC REGULATIONS, and under Schedule Sec. No. 6: The Boundaries of Bridgetown, Speightstown, Holetown and Oistin are cited as follows: 1) "City of Bridgetown" – "Bridgetown" – "The City":

The area bounded by Highway 7 at the junction of Bay Street with Jemmotts Lane; thence in a north easterly and northerly direction following Jemmotts Lane, Martindales Road and Halls Road to the junction of Halls Road not including the said boundary roads; thence in a westerly direction following Tweedside Road and Roebuck Street to the junction of Country Road with Roebuck Street; thence in a northerly, westerly, and south-westerly direction following Country Road and Passage Road and Westbury Road to the junction of Westbury Road with President Kennedy Drive; thence in a southwesterly direction following President Kennedy Drive to its junction with Samuel Jackman Prescod Boulevard not including President Kennedy Drive; thence in a southerly and westerly direction following Samuel Jackman Prescod Boulevard to its junction with Princess Alice Highway not including Samuel Jackman Prescod Boulevard; thence continuing in a westerly direction to a point on the sea-coast; thence in a south-easterly direction following the sea coast to the junction of Bay Street with Jemmotts Lane.

Beyond the boundary outlined, the wider Greater Bridgetown metropolitan area technically occupies most of the parish of Saint Michael, an area which covers around 39 km^{2} (15 sq mi). The above portion for the Road Traffic Act also omits much of the 90 acres of new land originally formed by completion of the Port of Bridgetown in 1961.

=== Careenage ===
At the heart of Bridgetown is the Careenage and Constitution River. The Careenage can be considered a marina for boaters entering or exiting the inner basin located directly in front of the Parliament buildings of Barbados. This body of water provides the city with direct access from medium-sized yachts or small craft boats. Although moderately shallow, the Careenage slices Bridgetown into two parts. During the rainy season the Constitution River flows into the Careenage area and acts as an outflow for water from the country's interior storm drainage network. Flowing into the Carlisle Bay on the southwest coast of the island.

=== Climate ===
Bridgetown features a tropical savanna climate (Köppen Aw), with relatively constant temperatures throughout the course of the year. While fairly hot, Bridgetown is cooled somewhat by the trade winds that affect weather in Barbados in general. Bridgetown's record high was 33.1 °C (91.6 °F) in September 2005 and record low was 16.5 °C (61.7 °F) on 2 January 1984. Bridgetown features distinct wet and dry seasons, with a relatively lengthy wet season and a shorter dry season. Its wet season is from June through December, while the dry season covers the remaining months.

Bridgetown, Barbados

Climate chart (precipitation, max. and min. temperature)
J	F	M	A	M	J	J	A	S	O	N	D
68 29 23	42 29 23	39 30 23	58 30 24	74 31 25	101 31 25	122 31 25	151 31 25	163 31 25	180 31 25	173 30 25	91 30 24
- █ Average max. and min. temperatures in °C
- █ Precipitation totals in mm
Imperial conversion
J	F	M	A	M	J	J	A	S	O	N	D
2.7 84 74	1.6 85 73	1.5 85 74	2.3 86 76	2.9 87 77	4 87 77	4.8 87 77	5.9 88 77	6.4 88 77	7.1 87 76	6.8 87 76	3.6 85 75
- █ Average max. and min. temperatures in °F
- █ Precipitation totals in inches

Climate data for Bridgetown (Grantley Adams International Airport) 1991–2020, extremes 1944–present
Month	Jan	Feb	Mar	Apr	May	Jun	Jul	Aug	Sep	Oct	Nov	Dec	Year
Record high °C (°F)	32.0 (89.6)	31.2 (88.2)	31.9 (89.4)	32.6 (90.7)	33.1 (91.6)	32.7 (90.9)	32.4 (90.3)	35.0 (95.0)	33.3 (91.9)	33.3 (91.9)	33.3 (91.9)	31.3 (88.3)	35.0 (95.0)
Mean daily maximum °C (°F)	29.1 (84.4)	29.2 (84.6)	29.7 (85.5)	30.2 (86.4)	30.6 (87.1)	30.7 (87.3)	30.7 (87.3)	30.9 (87.6)	31.0 (87.8)	30.8 (87.4)	30.3 (86.5)	29.6 (85.3)	30.2 (86.4)
Daily mean °C (°F)	26.0 (78.8)	25.9 (78.6)	26.3 (79.3)	27.0 (80.6)	27.7 (81.9)	27.8 (82.0)	27.8 (82.0)	27.9 (82.2)	27.9 (82.2)	27.7 (81.9)	27.2 (81.0)	26.6 (79.9)	27.2 (80.9)
Mean daily minimum °C (°F)	23.3 (73.9)	23.0 (73.4)	23.4 (74.1)	24.2 (75.6)	25.0 (77.0)	25.2 (77.4)	25.1 (77.2)	24.8 (76.6)	24.8 (76.6)	24.7 (76.5)	24.5 (76.1)	23.9 (75.0)	24.3 (75.8)
Record low °C (°F)	16.5 (61.7)	18.0 (64.4)	17.4 (63.3)	19.0 (66.2)	19.4 (66.9)	20.0 (68.0)	19.3 (66.7)	19.1 (66.4)	20.6 (69.1)	20.6 (69.1)	18.0 (64.4)	17.4 (63.3)	16.5 (61.7)
Average rainfall mm (inches)	68.1 (2.68)	41.7 (1.64)	38.9 (1.53)	58.1 (2.29)	74.1 (2.92)	101.2 (3.98)	121.5 (4.78)	150.6 (5.93)	162.6 (6.40)	179.6 (7.07)	172.6 (6.80)	91.0 (3.58)	1,260 (49.6)
Average rainy days	11	9	8	8	8	11	15	16	13	15	14	11	139
Average relative humidity (%)	77	76	75	76	77	79	80	81	81	82	82	78	79
Mean monthly sunshine hours	263.5	248.6	272.8	261.0	263.5	225.0	251.1	260.4	234.0	238.7	228.0	254.2	3,000.8
Mean daily sunshine hours	8.5	8.8	8.8	8.7	8.5	7.5	8.1	8.4	7.8	7.7	7.6	8.2	8.2
Source 1: Barbados Meteorological Services
Source 2: Meteo Climat (record highs and lows)

== The City ==
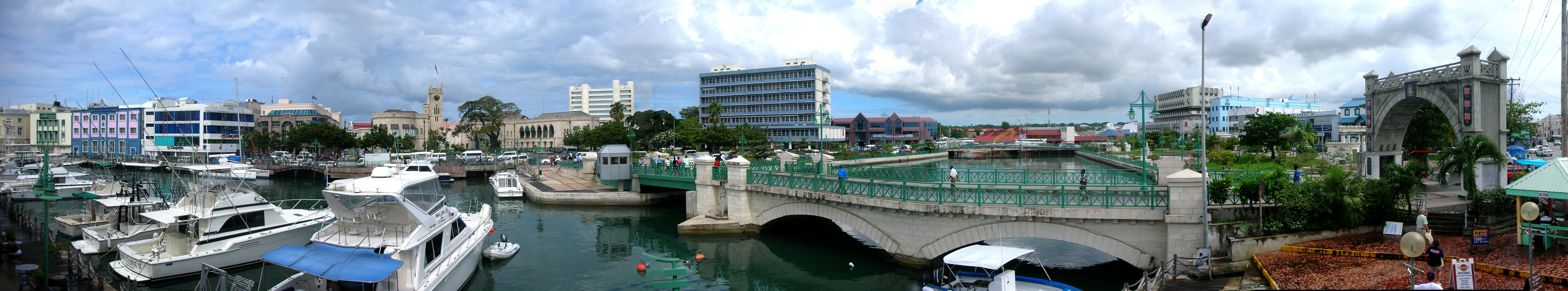
Bridgetown, showing Chamberlain Bridge and Parliament Building

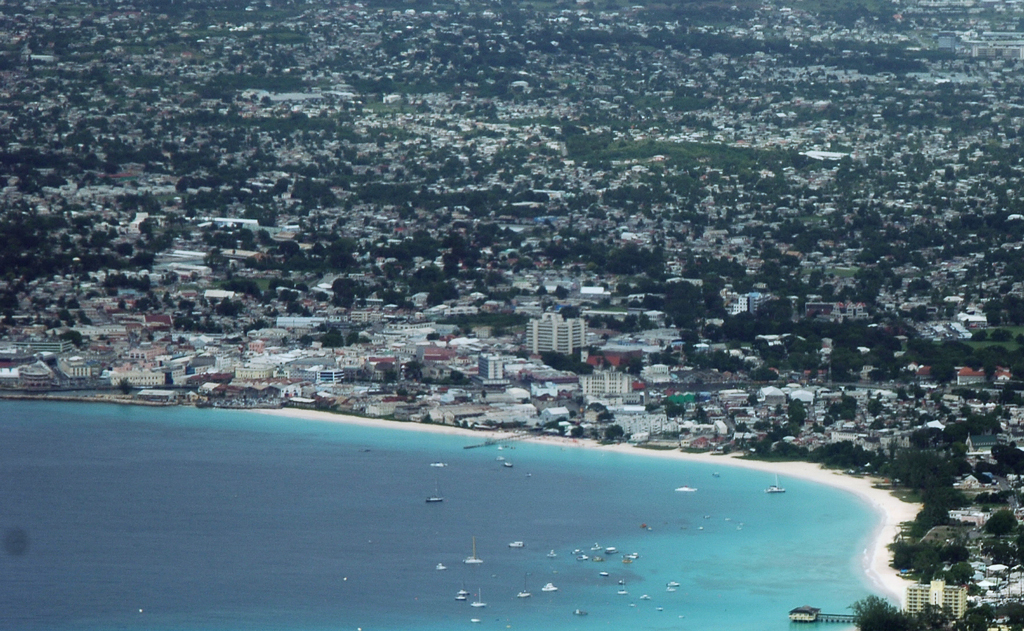
Central Bridgetown

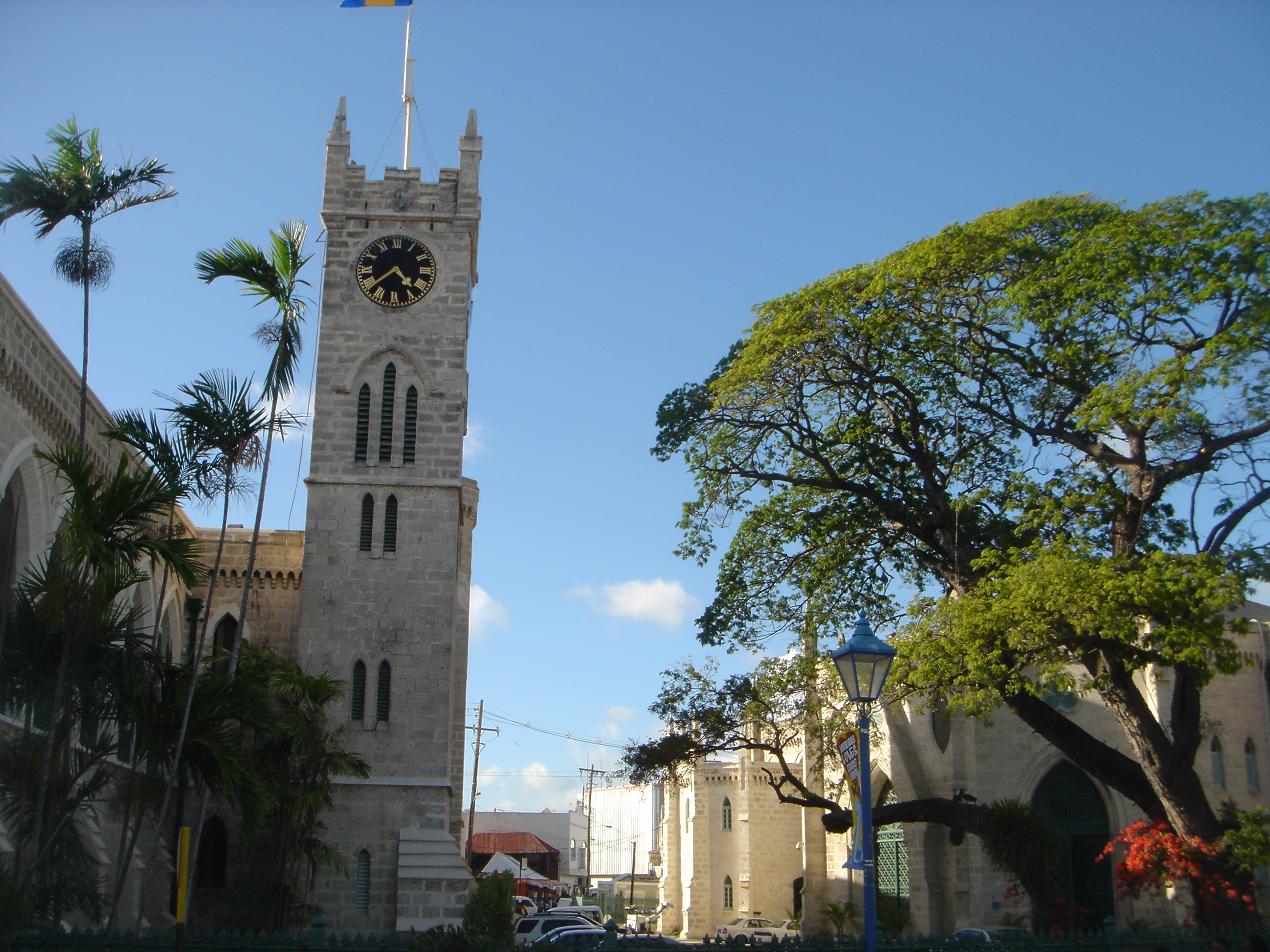
View from National Heroes Square, Bridgetown, Barbados, April 2007

In the centre lies the main street of Bridgetown which is Broad Street which runs directly through the centre of the city. Broad Street passes the Parliament Buildings and serves as the centre of city's shopping area.

Another major traffic artery into the city is Bay Street (which turns into Highway 7) and leads toward the South Coast of Barbados and the Parish of Christ Church. There are also other notable streets in Bridgetown, including:

- Swan Street – which is parallel to Broad Street, to the north.
- Roebuck Street – which leads towards Queens Park to the North, and East of Swan Street.
- Tudor Street – which comes from the north, intersects Swan Street and runs perpendicular to Broad Street.
- The Spring Garden Highway, which lies to the west of the city, plays host to over 85,000 bystanders and participants in the annual Grand Kadooment Carnival Parade.

=== Neighbourhoods ===
- Belleville
- Cat's Castle
- Cheapside
- Fontabelle
- Garden Land
- New Orleans
- Pinelands
- Strathclyde
- Weymouth
- Whitepark

=== Landmarks/points of interest ===
- National Heroes Square (formerly Trafalgar Square) and Fountain Garden

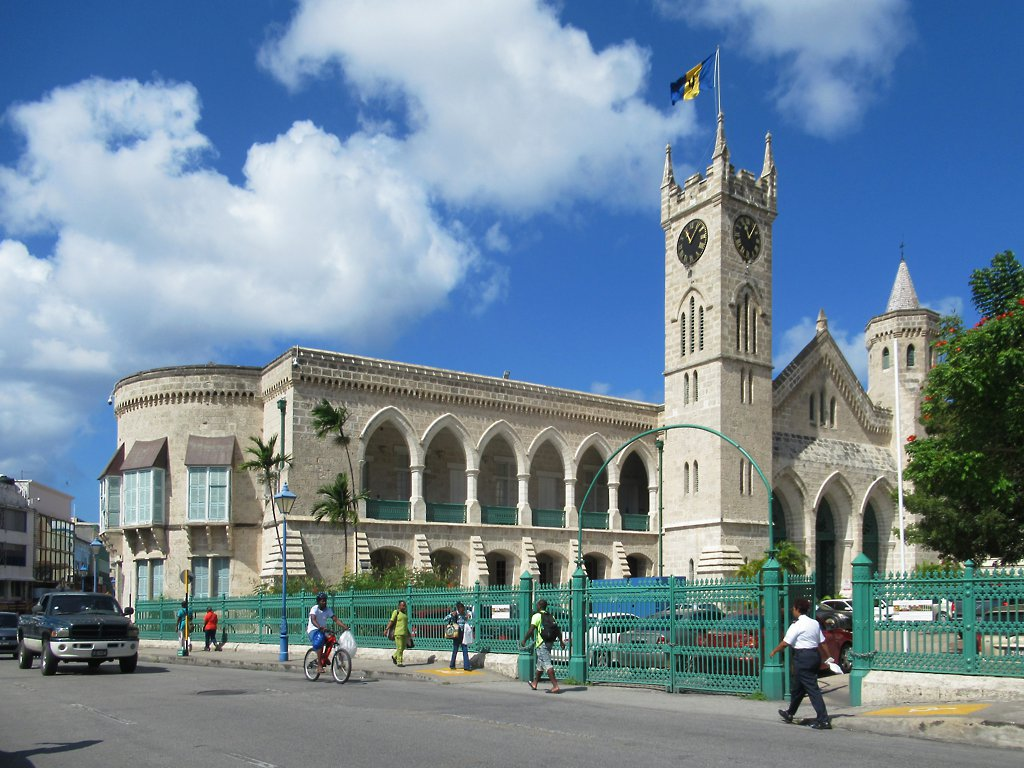
Parliament Building

- Independence Square and The Independence Arch
- The Montefiore Fountain
- Parliament Buildings of Barbados
- The Cathedral Church of Saint Michael and All Angels
- The St. Mary's Anglican Church
- The St. Patrick's Roman Catholic Cathedral
- Nidhe Israel Synagogue
- The Pelican Village and Craft Centre
- Queen's Park
- The Barbados Museum
- Kensington Oval (site of the 2007 Cricket World Cup final)
- Carlisle Bay Beach
- Cheapside market
- Rihanna Drive Monument
- The Tom Adams Financial Complex
- The Frank Collymore Hall of the Performing Arts
- The Cathedral Plaza
- The Cave Shepherd Department Store (No.10 Broad Street)
- The Mutual Building (lower Broad Street)
- The Cheapside Gardens
- Sagicor Plaza
- The Garrison Savannah and National Historic Area
- The Hilton Hotel
- Martineau House
- Pierhead Development Complex

=== Harbour ===
The Bridgetown Port (or "Deep Water Harbour" as it is also known) is the major port of entry for cruise and cargo ships docking in Barbados. The Deep Water Harbour lies a short distance across Carlisle Bay northwest of the Careenage Canal. Found along the Princess Alice Highway, and west of the city's centre around Fontabelle.

The Harbour port acts as one of the major shipping and transhipment hubs from international locations for the entire Eastern Caribbean. Recently, the Bridgetown Port was dredged to allow safe access and berthing for the new league of "super cruise ships". The dredging project was completed in 2002 and the city can now host many of the largest cruise ships in the world.

The port of Bridgetown also handles goods for the domestic needs of the island. The island's main exports of mainly agricultural products also make use of the harbour facilities.

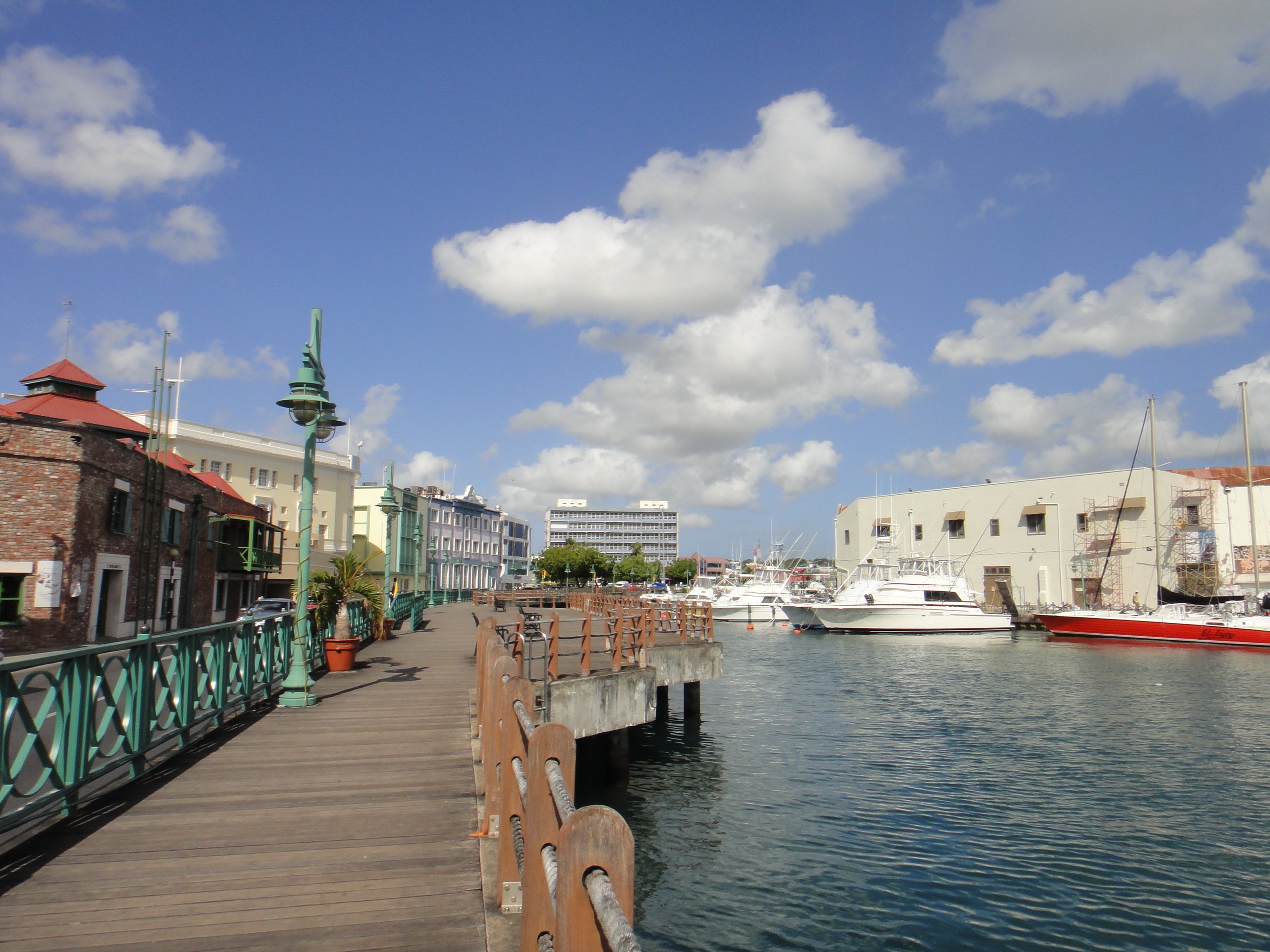
Walk along canal

Bridgetown also has a smaller canal in the centre of the city, named the Careenage, a.k.a. "Constitution River". The Constitution River should not be confused with the Deep Water Harbour. The smaller Constitution River feeding into the west coast lies about a half-kilometre south of the large harbour. The Careenage is just large enough for pleasure craft or fishing boats and has two main bridges near the city center which span the shallow Careenage.

== Society and culture ==
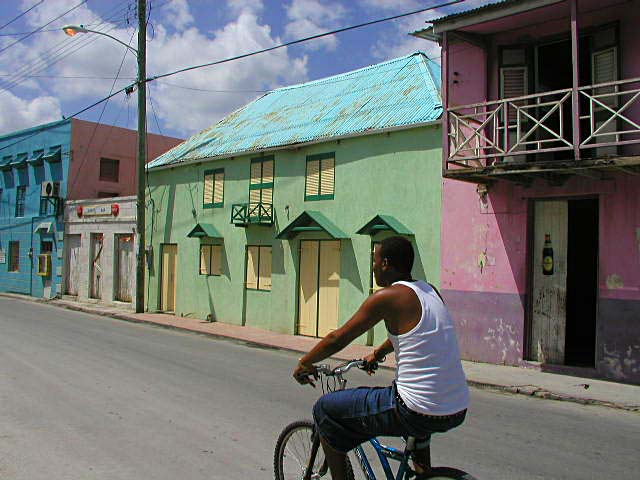
Colourful Bridgetown street

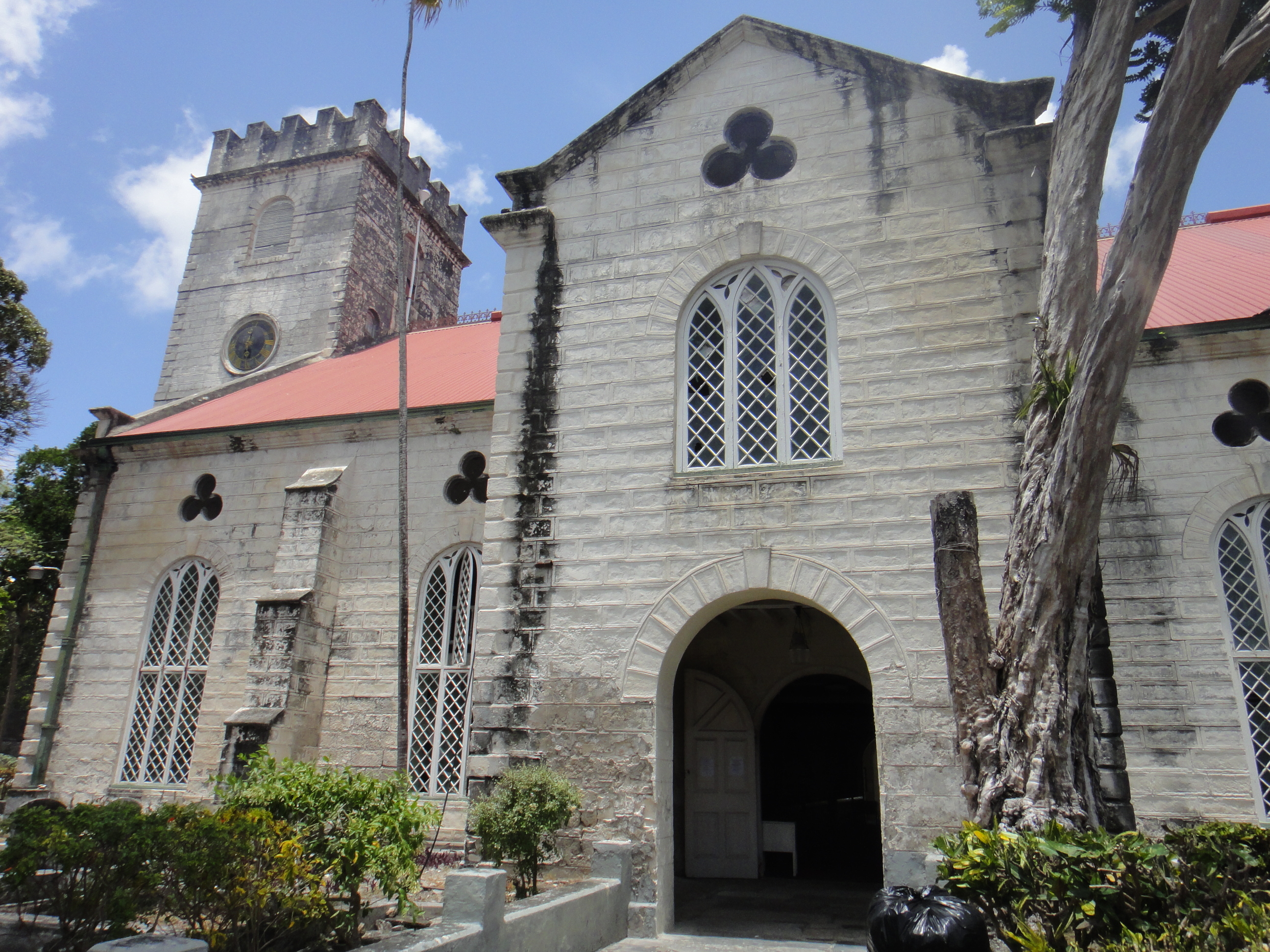
St. Michael's Cathedral

Bridgetown serves as a principal centre of commercial activity in Barbados, as well as a central hub for the island's public transport system. Many of the ministries and departments of the island's government are located within the Greater Bridgetown area. The Public Buildings or parliament, which stand at the heart of the city directly north of Heroes Square, house the third oldest continuous parliament in the British Commonwealth. Indeed, at one point in the city's early history, Bridgetown was the most important city of all British possessions in the New World due to the city's easterly location in the Caribbean region.

The headquarters of the National Library Service of Barbados is located in Bridgetown. The main branch is found on Coleridge Street, in a coral-stone building, built in the style of the English Renaissance.

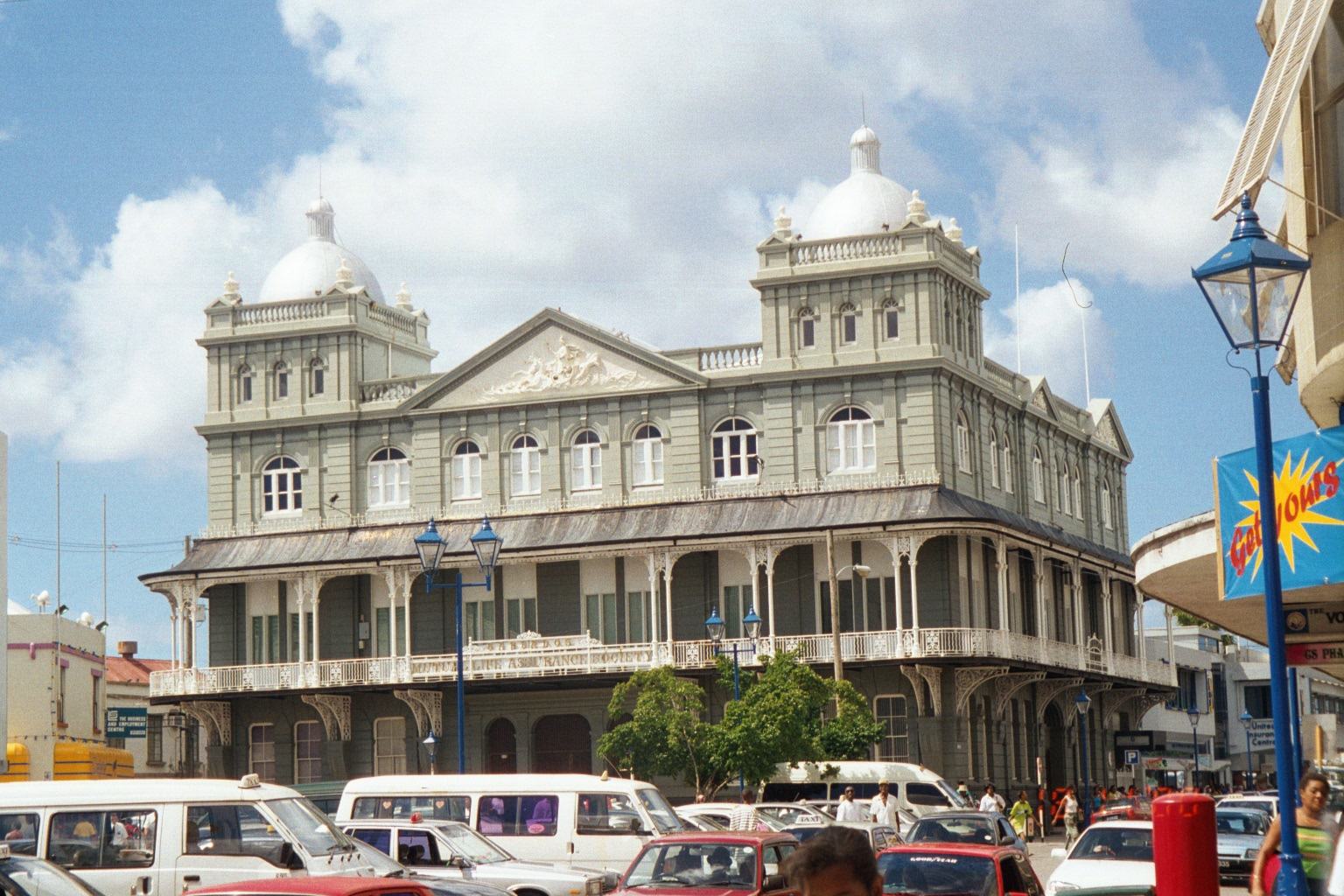
The iconic Barbados Mutual Life Assurance Society building from Broad Street

For a city of its size, the Greater Bridgetown area is home to several prestigious educational institutions. The city serves as the seat of one of the three campuses of the University of the West Indies in the northern suburb of Cave Hill. The campus sits on a bluff offering views of Bridgetown and its port. The Barbados Community College is located three miles (4.8 km) east of the Central Business District in a suburb known as "The Ivy", while the sprawling campus of the Samuel Jackman Prescod Polytechnic is located just beyond the eastern limits of the city in a suburb known as "The Pine". In addition, the city houses such distinguished secondary schools as Harrison College, Combermere and The St. Michael School. The American University of Barbados, School of Medicine located in Wildey area of the Parish of Saint Michael located roughly 4 km east of Bridgetown, it lies on the border with the Parish of Christ Church.

The City of Bridgetown also played host to the 1994 United Nations Global Conference on Sustainable Development of Small Islands States. Bridgetown has branches of some of the largest banks in the world and English-speaking Caribbean and is internationally recognised as an emerging financial domicile. The city underwent considerable redevelopment in preparation for the 2007 World Cricket Cup Finals held at the historic Kensington Oval. The stadium was renovated to a state-of-the-art sports facility accommodating 30,000 spectators. Live viewership for the 2007 event was estimated to be over 100 million people worldwide.

=== Utilities and local services ===
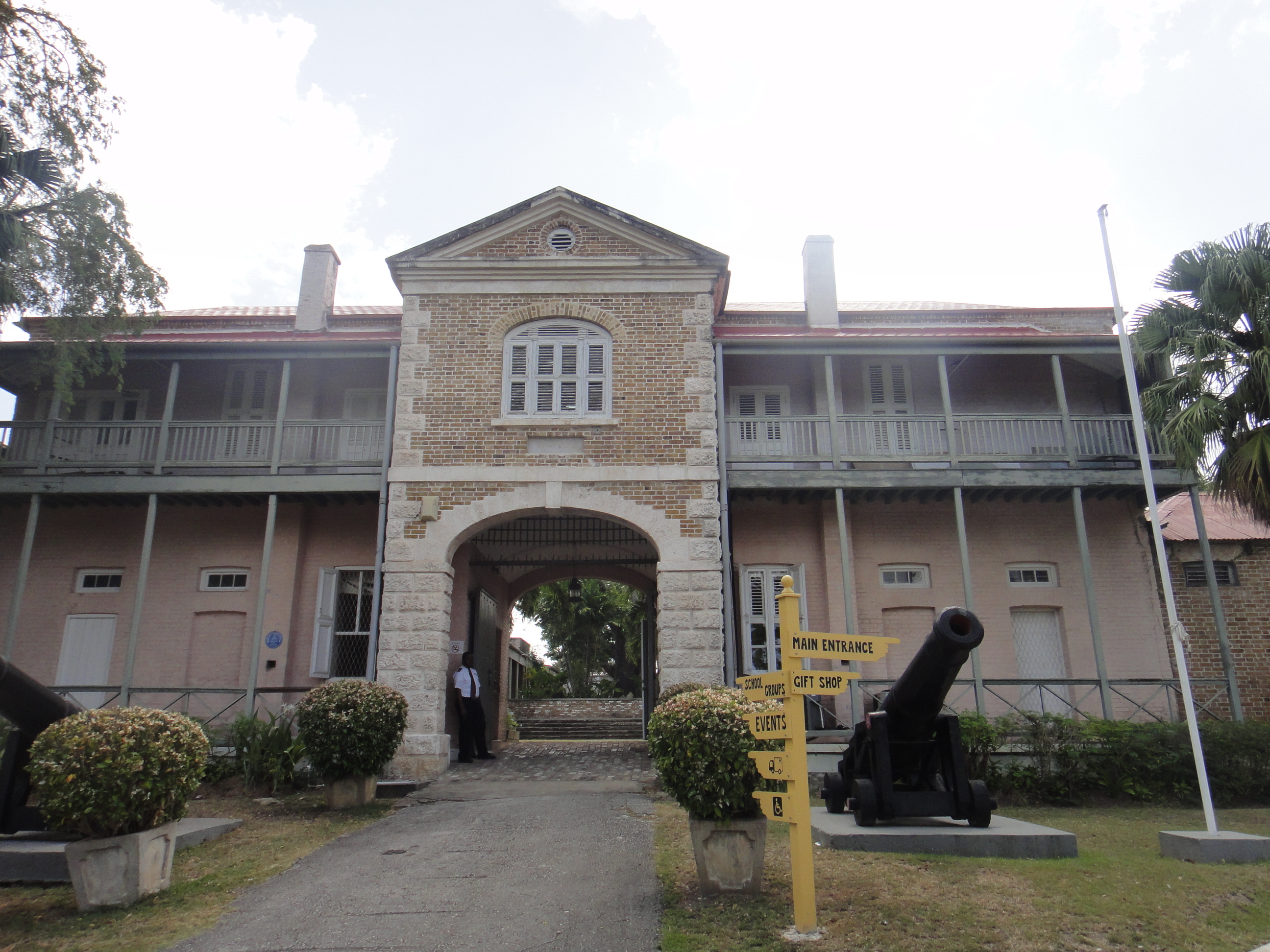
Barbados Museum and Historical Society at the military prison at St. Ann's Garrison

- Electricity – Barbados Light and Power Company Ltd. (BL&P)
- Natural Gas – National Petroleum Corporation
- Water – Barbados Water Authority (BWA)
- Telecommunications – Digicel, FLOW, and WIISCOM
- Television – CBC TV 8, Multi-Choice TV (Barbados), and DirecTV
- Radio – List of radio stations in Barbados
- Barbadian media

== Economy ==
Barbados' main exports are sugar, rum, and molasses. The island is also involved in other industries namely tourism and the offshore sector.

=== Stock exchange ===
- Barbados Stock Exchange (BSE), The city of Bridgetown has a stock exchange with securities of Barbadian and regional Caribbean companies.

=== Business/specifics ===
Business: Banks are open 08:00–15:00, Hours: Monday to Thursday, and 08:00–17:00 on Fridays.

The main banks are:

- Bank of Nova Scotia,
- Republic Bank,
- Canadian Imperial Bank of Commerce (CIBC) (see FirstCaribbean International Bank),
- First Citizens and
- Royal Bank of Canada (RBC)

Automatic Teller Machines are available.

Shops are open:

- 08:00–18:00 weekdays and
- 08:00–12:00 Saturdays.

Payment cards are widely accepted.

Electricity: 115 volts AC, 50 cycles. Most hotels have 220 AC.

Telecommunications: the international dialling code for Barbados is +1.246 followed by seven digits. On the island, use the seven digits alone. When on the island, to call anywhere in the United States or Canada simply dial +1 (area code) + seven digit phone number.

Emergency numbers: Police: 211 (emergency only) Fire: 311 Ambulance: 511 Coast Guard and Defense Force: +1.246.427.8819

== Transportation ==
The city has access to daily flights via the island's airport, the Sir Grantley Adams International Airport (GAIA) located on the ABC Highway/Highway 7 in Seawell, Christ Church. The airport and New York City's John F. Kennedy International Airport in the United States, were the only cities in the Western Hemisphere to be served by regularly scheduled British Airways Concorde service. Additionally, the airport has been chosen as one of only four global display sites for the retired supersonic aircraft. The airport is in the final stages of an expansion project, which will also include the construction of an aviation museum to house the retired Concorde aircraft.

All seven of Barbados's primary highways begin close to the City of Bridgetown, in the Parish of Saint Michael. They all fan out to the north, south and east to other parts of the island. Driving is done of the left-hand side of the road with a speed limit of 60 km/h (37 mph) in built-up areas. The speed limit on the ABC Highway is generally 80 km/h (50 mph) except in built-up areas. Water transport is regulated by the Barbados Port Authority.

=== Public buses ===
Public buses that head northward to destinations such as Holetown and Speightstown, and to some locations in St. Michael including the University of the West Indies – (Cave Hill Campus), leave from the Princess Alice Bus Terminal which lies to the west of the city centre. Buses for points east and south leave from the Fairchild Street Bus Terminal, which is on the eastern edge of the city centre, near to the Queen Elizabeth Hospital (QEH).

=== Route taxis ===
Route taxis are privately owned minivans which operate as taxicabs for hire.

== Diplomatic missions in Barbados ==
=== Twin towns – sister cities ===
Bridgetown is twinned with:

- Bridgetown, Nova Scotia, Canada (9 July 2004)
- Hackney, United Kingdom (1982)
- Hunan province, China (2023)
- New York City, New York, United States (22 October 2024)
- Wilmington, North Carolina, United States (28 June 2004)

== Notable people ==
Traditional depiction of Stede Bonnet's flag.

- Jofra Archer, cricketer
- Jacob Bethell, English cricketer
- Stede Bonnet, pirate, sometimes called "The Gentleman Pirate"
- Richard Clement Moody, founder of British Columbia.
- Gilbert Elliott (1870–unknown), first-class cricketer
- Anthony Forde, darts player
- Grandmaster Flash, rapper
- Orlando Greene, Olympic runner
- Dawn-Marie Layne, cricketer
- Zane Maloney, racecar driver and 2019 British F4 champion
- Malcolm Marshall, cricketer
- Dame Sandra Mason, first President of Barbados
- Jackie Opel, credited as creator of experimental syncopated music genre called Spouge.
- Rihanna, singer-songwriter
- Kyffin Simpson racecar driver and 2021 Formula Regional Americas champion
- Sir Garfield Sobers, cricketer
- Sir Clyde Walcott, cricketer
- Sir Everton Weekes, cricketer
- Sir Frank Worrell, cricketer

== See also ==
- Demographics of Barbados
- List of cities in Barbados
- List of cities in the Caribbean
- List of metropolitan areas in the West Indies
- Parishes of Barbados
- Transportation in Barbados
