= .bb =

Top-level Internet domain for Barbados

- Introduced: 3 September 1991
- TLD type: Country code top-level domain
- Status: Active
- Registry: Telecommunications Unit
- Sponsor: Ministry of Innovations, Science and Smart Technologies; Government of Barbados
- Intended use: Entities connected with Barbados
- Actual use: Gets some usage in Barbados
- Registration restrictions: Local presence. Must present documentation: business registration, certificate from relevant ministry.
- Structure: Registrations permitted at second level and at third level beneath various second-level labels
- Documents: .bb domain registration form, Policies and agreement
- DNSSEC: No
- IDN: No
- Registry website: www.nic.bb

.bb is the country code top-level domain (ccTLD) in the Domain Name System of the Internet for Barbados. It is administered by Telecommunications Unit which is part of the Ministry of Innovations, Science and Smart Technologies for the Government of Barbados. It was first registered on 3 September 1991.

== History ==
The .bb top-level domain has been maintained by several administrators since its creation, the first of which being the University of Puerto Rico.

In 1996, the Government of Barbados sought the relegation of .bb to the incumbent local exchange carrier, Cable & Wireless (BARTEL) Ltd.

A 2001 Memorandum of Understanding was then later signed between the Government of Barbados and both Cable & Wireless (Bartel) Ltd. and its sister company Cable & Wireless (BET) Ltd., to continue the administration of the ".bb" domains until the government selected alternate directives.

In November 2007, .bb was again relegated to the Telecoms Unit within the Government of Barbados.

== Registration ==
The Government has indicated that the government's policy will be to maintain a semi-restricted domain.

Legal issues regarding domains are to be handled by the Corporate Affairs and Intellectual Property Office (CAIPO) arm of the Government.

The fee for Barbados' main ccTLD and all of the second and third-level domains is BBD$120 annually, significantly higher than most other domains.

At present. the .bb namespace does not allow for commercial licences to entities without some connection to Barbados. Any person desirous of registering a ".bb" domain is required to fill out Form TU052 and send it the Telecommunications Unit for review.

== Second-level domains ==
Domain	Users
.co.bb	General use (usually commercial)
.com.bb	Commercial entities
.net.bb	Network providers
.org.bb	General use (usually for not-for-profit organisations)
.gov.bb	Barbadian government organisations
.edu.bb	Barbadian educational organisations
.info.bb	General use
.store.bb	General use
.tv.bb	General use
.biz.bb	General use

== See also ==
- Internet in Barbados
- ISO 3166-2:BB
- List of Internet top-level domains
