= Dawn-Marie Layne =

Barbadian cricketer (born 1988)

Personal information
- Full name: Dawn-Marie Renée Layne
- Born: 17 May 1988 (age 38); Bridgetown, Barbados
- Nickname: Dawnni
- Height: 5 ft 11 in (1.80 m)
- Batting: Left-handed
- Bowling: Right-arm Fast bowling
- Role: Bowler

International information
- National side: Barbados
- ODI shirt no.: 88

Domestic team information
- Years: Team
- 2012: Durham Cricket Board Women's 1st XI
- 2012: Northumbria University Cricket Club Women's 1st XI
- 2011: UWI Cave Hill Women's 1st XI
- 2011–2010: UWI Cave Hill Cricket Club
- 2010: Hertfordshire County Cricket Club Women's 1st XI
- 2010: Bishop's Stortford Women's 1st XI
- Source: , 31 December 2012

Dawn-Marie Renée Layne (born 17 May 1988) is a National Barbadian Cricketer. Layne is a right-arm fast bowler and a left-handed batswoman.

== Early life ==
She began playing cricket at the age of 10 at the Wesley Hall Primary School and went on to further her skills at the Combermere School under the coaching of Roddy Estwick. She was selected for her first National tour at age 14 but was unable to attend. Following that, Layne took a break from cricket to focus on her studies. She enrolled at the University of the West Indies in 2006, where she continued to play cricket leisurely but represented the University as a Track & Field Athlete specializing in the High Jump; she also represented the Combermere School as a 100-metre Hurdler for the time she was there.

== University Life to Present ==
In 2010, Layne was awarded a bachelor's degree in Psychology with honours and was given an offer to play cricket in the United Kingdom for the domestic season with the Bishop's Stortford Women's 1st XI; she then went on to also represent the Hertfordshire County Cricket Club Women's 1st XI. During this time, Layne was selected on the second occasion to represent her country after a 7-year period. Finishing off her 2010 season in Barbados representing the UWI Cave Hill Men's 3rd team, the Barbadian fast bowler took a season's best of 6/14. To date, Layne is arguably one of the fastest bowlers in the Caribbean.

In 2011, Layne became the Vice-Captain of the UWI Cave Hill Women's Cricket Team and following the West Indies Cricket Board Women's Regional Tournament, she was selected for the West Indies Women's A Team. In September of that year, she enrolled at Northumbria University to pursue her master's degree in Sport and Exercise Psychology where she subsequently graduated with an award of Commendation. While at Northumbria, in 2012, Layne had a stint with the Durham Cricket Board Women's 1st XI which was cut short after she opted to return home for her National trials. She has also founded her business which is focused on Mental Skills Coaching for athletes and hopes to become a Chartered Sport Psychologist. She also has plans of making her international début in the near future.
