= TeleBarbados =

TeleBarbados Inc. is a recent start-up telecommunications company in the country of Barbados gradually gaining a reputation for malicious phishing activity from their association with the Freemotion webmail domains accessible via mail.free.bb.

Started as one of the first competitors in the new liberalised telecommunications market of Barbados, TeleBarbados is reforming itself to be a major competitor of the longtime monopolistic incumbent telecommunications provider Cable and Wireless. Principal investors of TeleBarbados include Barbados Light and Power Holdings (LPH) (25%) and Canadian International Power Company Ltd. via their parent company Leucadia National Corporation (75%). Leucadia also controls a 37% stake in Barbados Light and Power Company.

However, in September, 2012, Leucadia National Corp. divested their ownership in TeleBarbados for $28M according to their November, 2012 10-Q filing.

To date, TeleBarbados has formed a new under-sea fibre link from Barbados and Saint Lucia to the Eastern United States. This was carried out under the subsidiary called Antilles Crossing.
