= Caribbean Electric Utility Services Corporation =

Caribbean Electric Utility Services Corporation (CARILEC)
- Formation: 1989
- Founder: United States Agency for International Development (USAID)
- Headquarters: Desir Ave Sans Soucis, Castries, Saint Lucia
- Services: Electric power
- Website: http://www.carilec.org/

The Caribbean Electric Utility Services Corporation (CARILEC) is an association of electric energy solution providers operating in the electricity industry in the Caribbean, Central and Southern Americas.

CARILEC's Mission is to enhance the effectiveness of its members by providing industry related services, creating regular networking, training and knowledge sharing opportunities; supporting mutual assistance programs and accelerating the Caribbean Region's energy sector transition, through innovation and advocacy.

Since its members invariably subsidize energy prices, they collect essential data about energy retail prices. The small nations of the Caribbean use the economies of scale to "share a currency and a central bank, some legal functions, and they are connected by the Caribbean Electric Utility Services Corporation (CARILEC), a nonprofit utility support corporation." CARILEC also furnishes technical assistance.

== History ==
CARILEC was established in 1989 with nine members as part of an electric utilities modernization project funded by USAID and implemented by NRECA under a five-year "Co-operative Agreement."

Currently, CARILEC comprises over one hundred members. This includes thirty three Utility Members that are electric utilities, Seven Independent Power Providers and over fifty Associate and Affiliate Members that are companies involved in some aspect of servicing the electric utility business.

=== Full Members ===
- Anguilla Electricity Company Ltd
- Antigua Public Utilities Authority
- Aqualectra
- Bahamas Power and Light Company
- Barbados Light and Power Company
- Belize Electricity Ltd.
- Bermuda Electric Light Company Ltd.
- British Virgin Islands Electricity Corporation
- Caribbean Utilities Company Ltd.
- Consorcio Energético Punta Cana-Macao
- Dominica Electricity Services Ltd.
- EDF - Archipel Guadeloupe
- EDF - Martinique
- Fortis TCI Formerly Provo Power Company
- Grand Bahama Power Company Ltd.
- Grenada Electricity Services Ltd.
- Guyana Power & Light Inc.
- Jamaica Public Service Company Ltd.
- Montserrat Utility Ltd.
- Nevis Electricity Company Ltd.
- N.V. Electriciteit-Maatschappij (Aruba)
- N.V. G.E.B.E.
- N.V. Energiebedrijven Suriname
- Roatan Electric Company S.A. DE C.V
- Saba Electric Company.
- St. Kitts Electricity Company Ltd.
- St. Lucia Electricity Services Ltd.
- St. Eustatius Utility Company
- St. Vincent Electricity Services Ltd.
- Trinidad & Tobago Electricity Commission
- Virgin Islands Water & Power Authority
- Water En Energiebedrijf Aruba N.V.
- Water en Energiebedrijf Bonaire N.V.

Other members - https://www.carilec.org/members/

== Leadership ==
According to the CARILEC by-laws provision is made for the appointment of a Board of Directors comprising not more than (15) and not less than (3) members to be responsible for policy governance. A Director shall be the Chief Executive/Operating Officer or a senior professional staff of a member utility. Provision is also made for the Directors to elect a chairman and Vice Chairman from among them. Currently, the Board of Directors of CARILEC comprises a fifteen (15) member team. Thirteen (13) of the Directors are elected at the annual meeting of members from among the Utility Members for a term of three years each, while one Director is elected to serve as a representative of the Associate Members for a period of one year. The Board also comprises an ex-officio Executive Director who is responsible for the day-to-day administration of the Secretariat located in Saint Lucia and serves as the Company Secretary/Treasurer.

== See also ==
- Energy law
