= Bico Limited =

Barbadian ice cream manufacturer

The Barbados Ice Cream Company Ltd. (BICO) (BSE:: BCO) is the leading Barbadian manufacturer of frozen desserts. The company was started in December 1901, as the Barbados Ice Company Limited, which made ice. It is now known as BICO. BICO started making ice cream in 1949. It is located near the Harbour Port Office park in Bridgetown.

== History ==
The Barbados Ice Company was formed as the result of a merger between two ice-making companies in 1901. The new company was engaged exclusively in ice manufacture until 1910, when it decided to extend its facilities. The expansion was made for a cold storage department. In 1949, it expanded again and began manufacturing ice cream. Subsequently, in 1967, it became a subcontractor for the Barbados Port Authority. In 1976, the Barbados Ice Company changed its name to BICO. Since then BICO has discontinued its production of ice.

== 2007 to present ==
Presently, it is a public limited company owned by over 350 shareholders, earning the majority of its revenue from its ice cream sales.

In June 2007, the company announced that it had completed renovations on freezer facilities, and the company expanded their previous 750,000 cubic feet (21,000 m^{3}) of storage space to just under 1 million cubic feet (28,000 m^{3}) of storage space. The new freezer space gives the BICO company one of the largest, if not the largest, public cold storage facility in the Caribbean region.

In August 2009, the BICO manufacturing plant was destroyed by a fire causing the company to outsource operations to two Canadian-based frozen dairy manufacturers. Meanwhile, ongoing delays have caused the BICO leadership to continue pressing the company's insurers to disburse funds to undertake rebuilding the BICO factory.

== Products ==
BICO makes the following products:

- Ice Cream
- Valupak
- Classic
- Perfect Balance
- Tropical Flavors
- Double Delight
- Old Fashioned
- Sherbet
- Frozen Yogurt
- Soycream
- Novelties
- Brik Ice Cream Sandwich
- Bicone
- Yocone
- Lollies
- Choc Ice

The company also exports to other Caribbean islands as well. It is listed on the Barbados Stock Exchange.

== See also ==
- List of ice companies
