= CBC TV 8 =

Public TV station in Barbados

CBC-TV 8 (8PX-TV)
- Barbados
- City: Bridgetown
- Channels: Analog: 8 4:3 (480i, SDTV); Digital: 108 16:9 (1080i) HDTV

Ownership
- Owner: Caribbean Broadcasting Corporation

History
- Founded: 1963
- First air date: 1964
- Former call signs: ZNX
- Former channel numbers: Ch. 3 (1964), to Ch. 9 (1984), to Ch. 8 (1991)-Current
- Call sign meaning: "8P", ITU-code for Barbados and followed by "X"

Technical information
- ERP: 60.0 kW (analog)

Links
- Website: www.cbc.bb

CBC TV 8 (8PX-TV) is a television station owned and operated by public broadcaster Caribbean Broadcasting Corporation in Barbados. It is the only legally licensed terrestrial television station in Barbados and is owned by the Government of Barbados; its studios are located in The Pine, Saint Michael. Channel 8 is affiliated with the Caribbean Broadcast Media Partnership on HIV/AIDS, the Caribbean Media Corporation and its subsidiary the Caribbean Broadcasting Union.

== History ==
CBC-TV first signed on in 1964 on channel 3 and it broadcasts for at least 4 hours on weekdays, and 5½ hours on Sundays. It became the first West Indian station to air colour broadcasts in 1971, and transitioned from the PAL format to NTSC in 1979. It moved to channel 9 in 1984 and its current channel position, channel 8, in 1991.

== Broadcast schedule ==
TV 8's local programs include Mornin' Barbados every weekday from 6:30 to 8:00 a.m.

The station's news broadcast, at 7:00 p.m., runs for an hour on weekdays and 30 minutes on weekends; The station also shows movies late at night.

== Coverage ==
CBC-TV 8 can also be seen on channel 108 on Multi-Choice TV, the CBC's wireless cable television system. The broadcasting area of the station also reaches the neighbouring islands of Dominica, Grenada, Saint Lucia, and Saint Vincent and the Grenadines.

Plans have been formulated for upgrading to the ATSC standard, however concerns have been raised over selecting this system due to possible prohibitive costs associated.

The station provides Barbadians with some off-air news and sports updates via social media including Facebook and Twitter. Rebroadcasts of the news and other special programmes are posted on the station's official YouTube channel "CBCBARBADOS".

== See also ==
- Caribbean Broadcasting Corporation (CBC)
- Communications in Barbados
- List of television stations in the Caribbean
