= CBC Radio (Barbados) =

Public radio station in Barbados

CBC Radio is the flagship radio station of the Caribbean Broadcasting Corporation, Barbados' public broadcaster. It broadcasts on 900 kHz (AM) and also on 94.7 MHz (FM). The Caribbean Broadcasting Corporation also owns and operates The One 98.1 FM (Barbados) and on Quality 100.7 FM MHz.

== History ==
CBC Radio was introduced on 16 December 1963 as the first wireless radio station in Barbados. Previously, Barbados had a wired cable Rediffusion service from 1935 to 1997. CBC Radio was the only wireless radio station in Barbados until VOB 92.9 FM was introduced with former radio station Gospel 790 AM in 1981. It was known as "Radio Barbados" and later on in the late 1980s as "Sound Sensation 900 AM", and is now known as "CBC 94.7 FM, The Caribbean's Best Connection". Gospel 790 AM became Life 97.5 FM after it was introduced in 2013.

Local programs include "Under the Sandbox Tree", "What's Your Opinion" and others. It also presents radio broadcasts of some sporting events (though international events originating outside of Barbados, such as Champions' Trophy cricket, are blacked out on the internet feed). When no regularly scheduled programs are heard, CBC Radio plays all Caribbean music. The station has news updates on the hour and major newscasts which are held every seven days at 5:00 AM, 6:00 AM, 7:00 AM, 8:00 AM, 1:00 PM, 5:00 PM and 7:00 PM. The station used to air obituary announcements, but those are now aired on its sister station, Quality 100.7 FM.

The station maintains an online stream mainly for Barbadians from around the world to tune in, as well as social media such as Facebook where contests, debates of differing points of view, and other communication with on-air personalities take place. The all new CBC Radio 94.7 FM was re-introduced and re-broadcast on 29 May 2010, along with the greatest songs and hits of the '70s, '80s, '90s and today. It was formerly known as "The Caribbean's Best Connection" in the 1980s' and now it was known as "The Rhythm of Life" station after it had been introduced since 29 May 2010.

CBC Radio 94.7 FM was closed on 31 December 2018. CBC continues to broadcast on 900 AM.

On 2 April 2020, during the ongoing spread of the COVID-19 pandemic in Barbados and across the world, the 70s', 80s', 90s' and today's greatest hits and songs and also both the regional and international songs and hits on CBC Radio 94.7 FM had been withdrawn and no longer operated and was temporarily joined with Q 100.7 FM and CBC Radio 900 AM from 2 April to 11 October 2020. When CBC Radio 94.7 FM permanently left Q 100.7 FM, it is now known as "the best 24/7" all-Barbadian radio station since its operation on 12 October 2020 after Q 100.7 FM had returned to its normalcy and CBC Radio 900 AM had ever since been withdrawn and no longer operated.

== On Air Staff ==
- Diane Forte
- Anderson "Mr. Blood" Armstrong
- Omar "DJ Chilly" Jordan
- Alicia Hintzen
- Joanne Sealy
- Teshia Hinds
- Pearson Bowen
- Kevin "KB Kleen" Hinds

== Former On Air Staff ==
- Anthony "Admiral" Nelson
- Jaquila Lewis
- Arturo Valentino
- Janelle Gilkes
- Jerrard "Jerry" Tull
- Anderson "Andi" Thornhill

== See also ==
- Caribbean Broadcasting Corporation (CBC)
- List of radio stations in Barbados
