= WIBISCO =

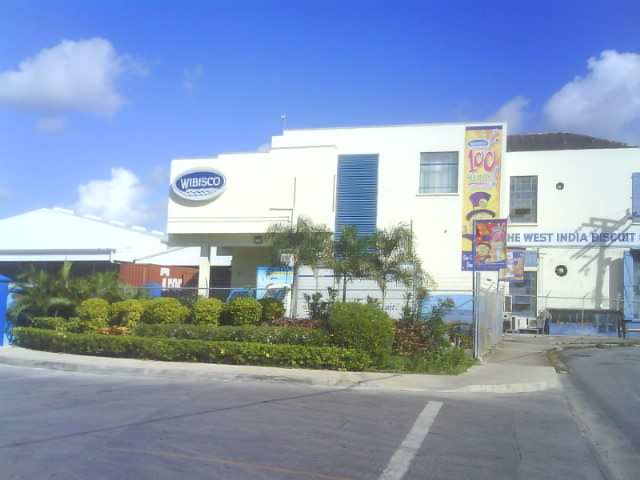
WIBISCO building (in Bridgetown)

The West India Biscuit Company better known as WIBISCO ("wihh-bis-co") (BSE:: WIB) is a company located in Barbados, and is subsidiary of the Trinidad and Tobago-based Bermudez group as of 2007. The products made are biscuits, crackers, cookies etc. The company was listed on the Barbados Stock Exchange. For the year 2006, product sales stood at $16.8 million. While in 2012 profits stood at $53.8 million.

The company is somewhat of a patriotic symbol to some Bajans. The company's brand of biscuits known as Eclipse biscuits is considered a part of the essential Bajan breakfast.
