= List of government ministries of Barbados =

The Government of Barbados contains a number of government ministries which control and govern various aspects of the country. Barbados currently has around 30 ministries, each with its appointed Minister.

== Current Structure of Government Ministries ==
- Prime Minister's Office
- Ministry of the Public Service
- Ministry of Finance, Economic Affairs and Investment
- Office of the Attorney General
- Ministry of Legal Affairs
- Ministry of Education, Technological and Vocational Training
- Ministry of Housing, Lands and Rural Development
- Ministry of Foreign Affairs and Foreign Trade
- Ministry of International Business and Industry
- Ministry of Environment and National Beautification
- Ministry of People Empowerment and Elder Affairs
- Ministry of Tourism and International Transport
- Ministry of Transport Works and Maintenance
- Ministry of Health and Wellness
- Ministry of Home Affairs
- Ministry of Small Business, Entrepreneurship and Commerce
- Ministry of Energy and Water Resources
- Ministry of Labour and Social Partnership Relations
- Ministry of Youth and Community Empowerment
- Ministry of Maritime Affairs and the Blue Economy
- Ministry of Agriculture and Food Security
- Ministry of Creative Economy, Culture and Sports
- Ministry of Innovation, Science and Smart Technology
- Ministry of Information, Broadcasting and Public Affairs
