= Caribbean Broadcasting Corporation =

Public radio and television broadcaster of Barbados

- Type: Broadcast radio network Television network
- Country: Barbados
- Availability: National
- Owner: Government of Barbados
- Key people: Sherwood McCaskie General Manager; Mr. Pearson Bowen: Head of Radio Department; Jewel Forde: Head of Television; Mr. Andrew Greene: Chief MCTV Officer; Mark Seale: Head of News and Current Affairs
- Launch date: December 1963 (radio); December 1964 (television)
- Official website: www.cbc.bb

The Caribbean Broadcasting Corporation (CBC) is a public radio and television broadcaster, located in The Pine, St. Michael in Barbados. It was founded in 1963 as Radio Barbados. The CBC falls under the ministry and jurisdiction of the Prime Minister's Office.

The television service broadcasts on channel 8 and is the only legally licensed, over-the-air television channel broadcasting in the country of Barbados. The corporation also owns and operates three radio stations: CBC Radio on 94.7 MHz FM and its simulcast on 900 kHz AM, The One on 98.1 MHz FM and Q-100.7 on 100.7 MHz FM.

Besides the terrestrial television and radio, the CBC operates a wireless subscription-based service called Multi-Choice TV (MCTV) which offers many television stations from around the globe, including the United States, Canada, Europe, the Caribbean, and Latin America.

== History ==
In 2003, it was announced the corporation would be transformed into a publicly-owned station with the aim of issuance of shares on the Barbados Stock Exchange.

In August 2006, chairman, Sonwabo Funde of the South African Broadcasting Corporation (SABC) reportedly held discussions with Barbadian government officials with the aim of forming a partnership or acquiring a stake in the CBC.

In early January 2007, CBC had broadcast its sponsorships and TV broadcaster CBC TV 8 for the hosting of the ICC Cricket 2007 Cricket World Cup in Barbados from New Year's Day, 1 January to National Heroes' Day, 28 April 2007 during live broadcast at the Kensington Oval, Fontabelle, St. Michael, from 11 to 21 and 28 April 2007 with the West Indies, Barbados, Grenada, St. Lucia, Guyana, Trinidad and Tobago, Antigua and Jamaica vs. England, India, Australia and New Zealand.

In 2012, as part of a campaign promise the Barbados Labour Party's leader, Owen Arthur stated if his party wins the upcoming general election, the CBC could become privatised under that party's plan to reform the Barbadian Government.

The CBC is a member of: the Caribbean Broadcast Media Partnership on HIV/AIDS, the Caribbean Cable & Telecommunications Association, the Commonwealth Broadcasting Association within the Commonwealth of Nations, Caribbean Broadcasting Union, and the Public Media Alliance.

CBC had started its Countdown to 50 Years of Independence from 1 December 2015 to Independence Day, 30 November 2016 with the Government and the People of Barbados.

In 2019, the Caribbean Broadcasting Corporation (Amendment) Bill, 2019 was passed by Parliament transforming the post of General Manager into CEO.

CBC had also started its Barbados Vision 2020 "We Gatherin'" from New Year's Day, 1 January to Old Year's Night on 31 December 2020 for eleven parishes and the country of Barbados, but was subsequently stopped showing it on TV because of the spread of the SARS-CoV-2 coronavirus pandemic (COVID-19) and the staff engaging in remote distancing.

== Mandate ==
The Caribbean Broadcasting Corporation Act, (1963). was enacted...

...to provide, in accordance with this Act, broadcasting services of high quality both as to the transmission and as to the matter transmitted.

The functions of the corporation as outlined in the act are: To have the powers-

- to erect, maintain and operate broadcasting, transmitting, relay and receiving stations;
- to arrange for the provision and equipment of, or, if need be, themselves to provide and equip, studios and other premises for broadcasting purposes;
- to make arrangements for the distribution of programmes broadcast by the corporation and to receive programmes to be broadcast by the corporation;
- to do such things as are necessary or expedient for the purpose of turning to account any property or rights of the corporation.

== Broadcasting ==
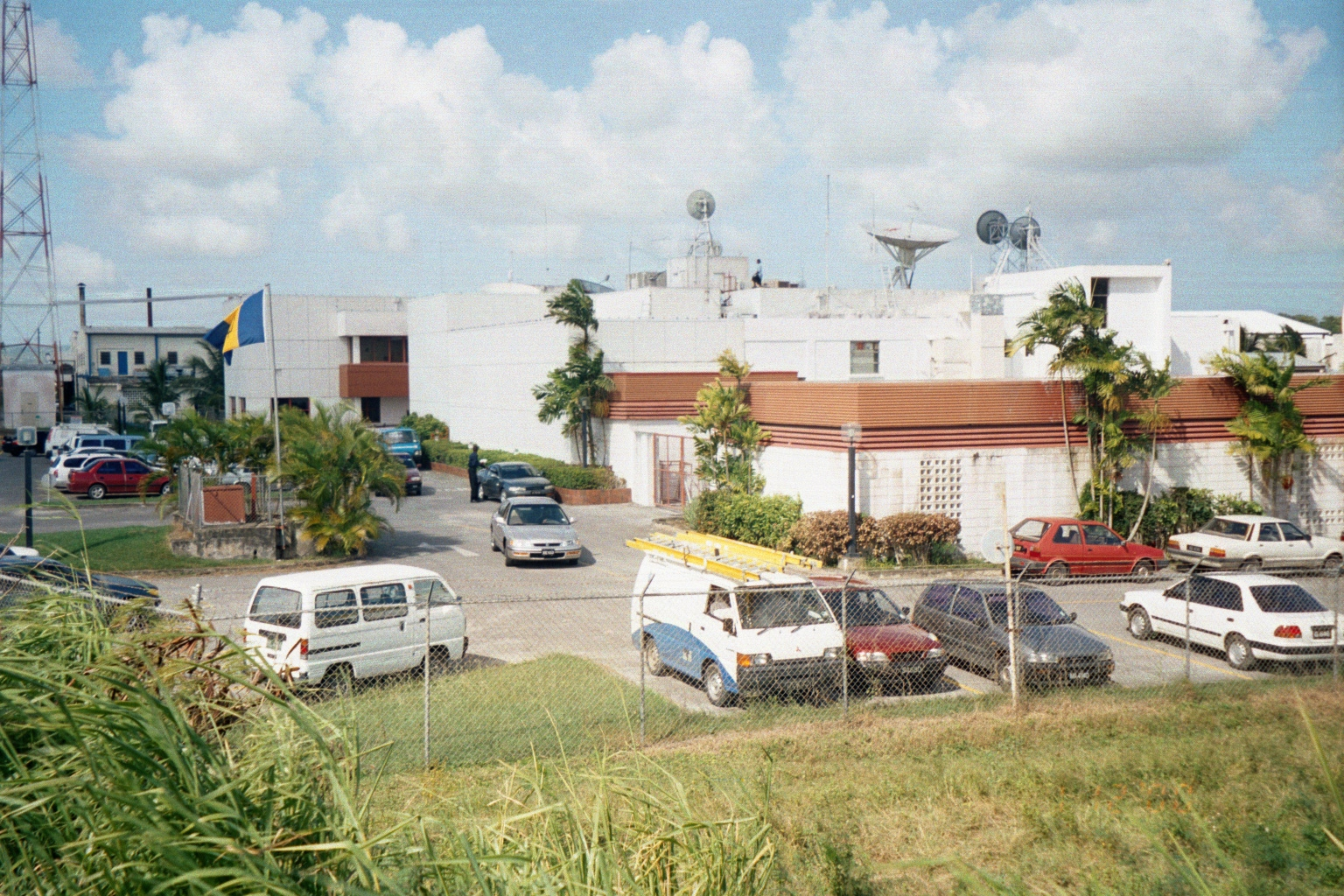
CBC Headquarters.

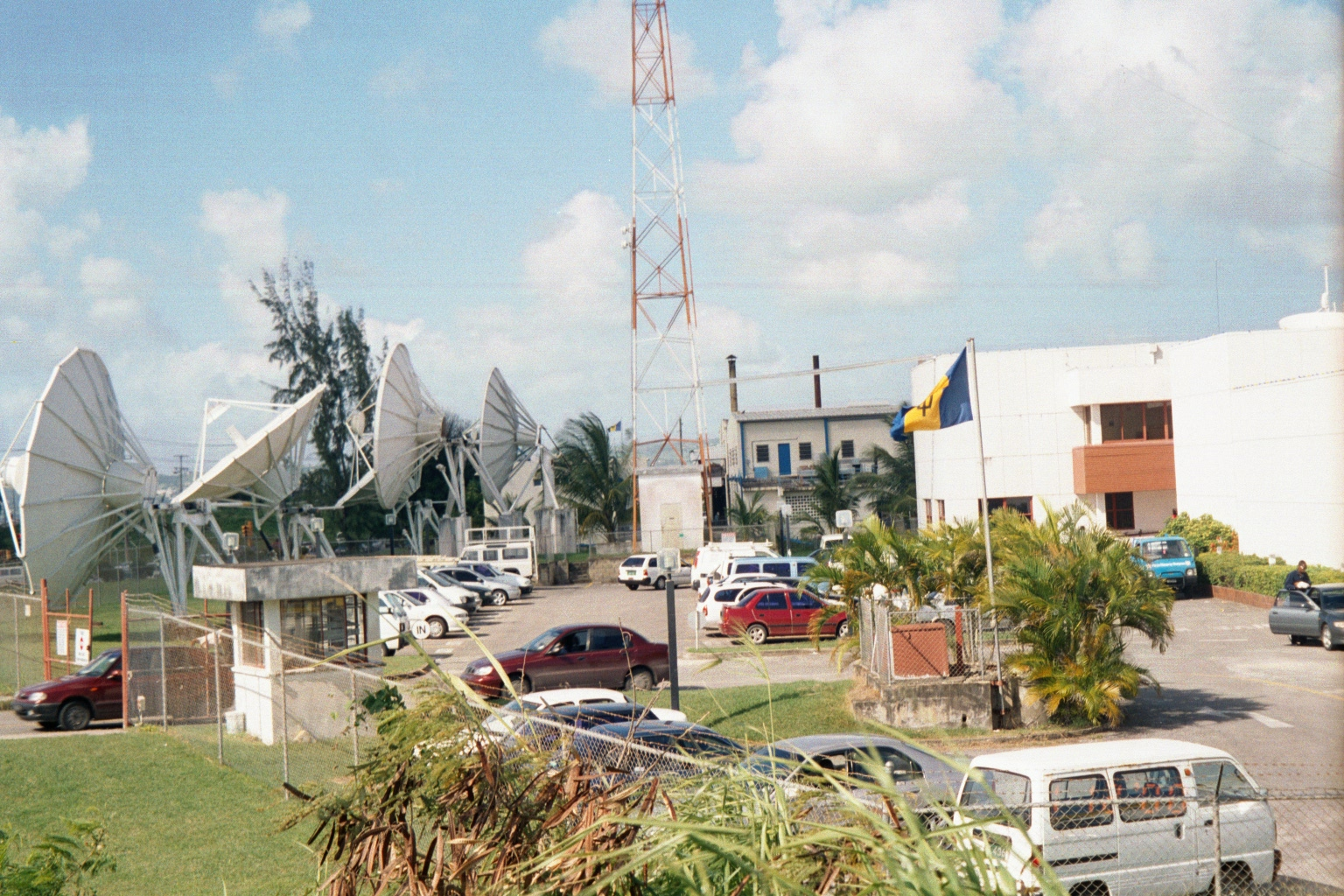
CBC's multiple satellites next to the Errol Barrow section of the ABC Highway in The Pine, St. Michael, Barbados

CBC's studios and offices are located North of Wildey at The Pine, Saint Michael. The television broadcast transmitter is located at the Cave Hill Campus of the University of the West Indies (Lazaretto, Black Rock), however, it will soon be replaced by a transmitter at The Belle, St. Michael. The television broadcast is provided in the NTSC television format.

== Services ==
=== Television channel ===
- CBC TV 8 - Sturges, St. Thomas transmitter

=== Radio stations ===
- CBC Radio Hits 94.7 FM & 900 AM
- The ONE 98.1
- Quality 100.7 FM

== Leadership ==
=== General Managers ===
- Dr. Allyson Leacock, 2002–2006
- Austin Clark, 1975–1977
- Ian Gale, –1974
- Doug Hoyte, 2016–2019
- Sherwood McCaskie (acting), 2019–2020
- Melba Smith, 1995–2001
- Lars G.O. Söderström, 2008–2011
- Samuel Taitt, 1986–1994
- Paul S. Watson, 1963 - ?

=== Chief Executive Officers ===
- Mr. Sanka Price, 2020 – Present

== See also ==
- CaribVision
- Public Broadcast Service
- Caribbean Broadcasting Union
- List of cricket commentators
- List of radio stations in Barbados
