= Voice of Barbados =

Former Barbadian radio station

Voice of Barbados (VOB) was introduced in 1981 as Barbados' second radio station. Originally located at 790 AM, the station was meant to complement the Redifussion service. In the late 1990s Voice of Barbados (VOB) changed to the FM dial, with 790 AM changing format from general to gospel. 790 AM was abandoned when the gospel format was moved to 97.5 FM.

Voice of Barbados is now part of the Starcom Network of stations.

After One Caribbean Media was unsuccessful at obtaining a fifth radio license in Barbados after already having stations at 92.9, 95.3, 97.5 and 104.1, the company sought to find a way to vacate an existing frequency for the Caribbean Super Station. A decision was made that Gospel FM's frequency at 97.5 was the spectrum to be utilized for that new station and moves were undertaken to find a suitable station which Gospel FM could be merged with.

On 4 April 2011, the gospel programming of Gospel 97.5FM was merged with that of Voice of Barbados 92.9FM at the latter's frequency. VOB's programming could be heard from midnight to 6.15pm and Gospel programs from 6.15pm to midnight on the VOB frequency. The Gospel FM frequency was occupied by the new Caribbean Super Station radio programme as compensation for the loss of BBC Caribbean.

Gospel programming has since returned to 97.5 FM as Life 97.5 FM has since replaced Caribbean Super Station at that frequency.

== See also ==
- Starcom Network
