= Barbados Stock Exchange =

Stock exchange located in Bridgetown, Barbados

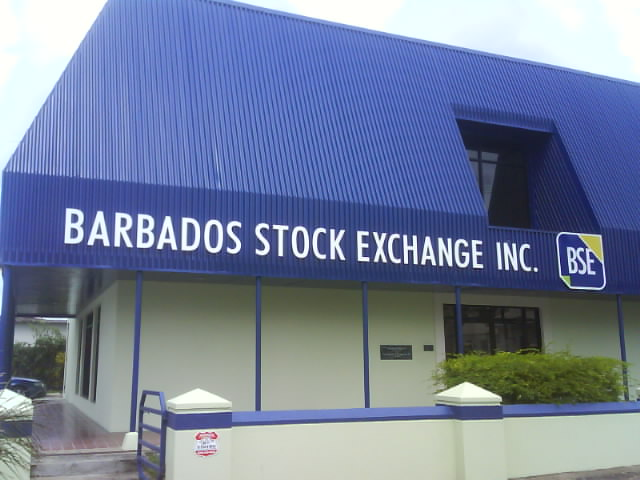
- Type: Stock exchange
- Location: Bridgetown, Barbados
- Coordinates: 13°05′51″N 59°37′00″W
- Founded: 1987
- Key people: Marlon Yarde (CEO)/(GM)
- Currency: Barbados dollar
- No. of listings: 21
- Market cap: BBD$8.7 billion (Nov 2010)
- Indices: Local; Cross listed Junior market
- Website: www.bse.com.bb

The Barbados Stock Exchange (BSE) is Barbados' main stock exchange. Its headquarters are in the capital-city Bridgetown. The body was established in 1987 by the Parliament of Barbados as the Securities Exchange of Barbados (SEB), and remained known as such until August 2, 2001. The unique four symbol alphanumeric Market Identifier Code (MIC) used to identify the BSE as defined under ISO 10383. of the International Organization for Standardization (ISO) is: XBAB.

== History ==
The body was established in 1987 by the Parliament of Barbados as a statutory body under CAP. 318A, Section 44 of the Securities Exchange Act (1982). Under this original charter it was constituted as the Securities Exchange of Barbados (SEB), and remained known as such until August 2, 2001, when Parliament repealed and replaced the prior act with an updated charter under The Securities Act 2001–3

Since July 4, 2001 the BSE has operated under a fully electronic trading utilizing the Order routing method. The electronic system succeeds the manual system, which comprised an open auction outcry method of trading.

Although it was given effect by Parliament, the BSE functions as a not-for-profit organisation which is privately owned (by its Members). Authority is vested in a Board of Directors, which is chaired by the General Manager.

The Barbados Stock Exchange is among the four major regional Caribbean stock exchanges. The other three being the Jamaica Stock Exchange, the Eastern Caribbean Securities Exchange, and Trinidad and Tobago Stock Exchange. The BSE is the third largest stock exchange in the Caribbean region. The BSE along with officials from Jamaica and Trinidad and Tobago are working to integrate these stock exchanges into a single unit known as the Caribbean Exchange Network (CXN) The Trinidad and Tobago exchange has mooted the establishment of some form of association with the U.S. or Canadian based stock exchanges going forward.

As of 2009, officials at the stock exchange were investigating the possibility of augmenting the local exchange with an International Securities Market (ISM) venture.

As of 2010, BSE was one of twenty-seven correspondent members of the World Federation of Exchanges (WFE).

On 28 January 28, 2020 the Nairobi Securities Exchange Plc. in Kenya and BSE signed a joint Memorandum of Cooperation (MoC) to help promote links between Africa, Latin America, and the Caribbean regions.

On March 23, 2014, BSE became the 112th announced member of the United Nations Sustainable Stock Exchanges initiative.

== Buildings and locations ==
The BSE was located at the 5th Floor of the Tom Adams Financial Centre; prior to relocating to 1st Floor, of Carlisle House on Hincks Street in Bridgetown. Most recently, it relocated to Eighth Avenue in the Bridgetown suburb of Belleville, St. Michael.

== Past G.M.s ==
- Virginia Mapp
- Tessa Pickering

== Listed companies ==
- Almond Resorts Inc. -- ARI site
- ANSA McAL (Barbados) Ltd. -- MCAL site
- Banks Holdings Ltd. -- BHL site
- Barbados Dairy Industries Ltd. (Pine Hill Dairy) -- BDI
- Barbados Farms Ltd. -- BFL
- Barbados National Bank Inc. -- BNB site
- Barbados Shipping & Trading Co. Ltd. -- BST site
- Bico Ltd.—BCO
- Cable & Wireless Barbados Ltd. -- CWBL site
- Cave Shepherd & Co. Ltd. -- CSP site
- FirstCaribbean International Bank—FCI
- Fortress Caribbean Property Fund—CPF site
- Goddard Enterprises Ltd. -- GDE site
- Insurance Corporation of Barbados Ltd—ICBL site
- Jamaica Money Market Brokers Ltd. -- JMMB site
- Light & Power Holdings Ltd. -- LPH site
- Light & Power Holdings Ltd. 5.5% Pref—LPH55 site
- Neal & Massy Holdings Ltd. -- NML site
- One Caribbean Media Ltd. -- OCM site
- Sagicor Financial Corporation—SFC site
- Sagicor Financial Corporation 6.5% Pref—SFC65 site
- Trinidad Cement Ltd—TCL site
- The West India Biscuit Company Ltd. -- WIB site
- West Indies Rum Distillery
- Royal Fidelity TIGRS A Fund—RFTA site
- Royal Fidelity TIGRS A1 Fund—RFTA1 site

== Formerly listed companies ==
- A.S. Brydens & Sons Ltd. -- ASB
- BWIA West Indies Ltd. -- BWIA
- Courts (Barbados) Ltd. -- CTS
- Life of Barbados Ltd—LOB: Now Sagicor Financial Corporation
- RBTT Financial Holdings Ltd. -- RBTT
- GraceKennedy Ltd—GKC
- Sunbeach Communications Inc. -- SBH

Other companies: List of Barbadian companies

== See also ==
- Economy, Economy of Barbados, Barbados, Barbadian dollar
- List of stock exchanges
- List of stock exchanges in the Americas
- List of stock exchanges in the Commonwealth of Nations
- Stock exchanges of small economies
