= Multi-Choice TV =

Television service provider in Barbados

Multi-Choice TV

Multi-Choice TV (MCTV) is a television service provider in Barbados. It is a Multichannel Multipoint Distribution Service (MMDS) or DVB-C Wireless microwave-based broadcast subscription television provider. They offer a variety of packages which can be considered as comparatively priced to similar providers throughout the world.

== History ==
The service began operating on December 14, 1987, under the name Subscription Television (STV), which had very few channels offered. The main channels were CNN, ESPN, and Lifetime Television, with an occasional option of pay per view (PPV) being offered for local special events and the occasional international PPV sports broadcast. In 1996 it was upgraded to include a new platform called Multi-Choice TV which was an analog wireless microwave broadcast offering many more channels (e.g. the BBC, Canada's CBC and TBN), eventually reaching bandwidth capacity and having to upgrade the service to a digital broadcast system. Multi-Choice TV have not fully converted all of its subscribers yet. The system relies on line-of-sight propagation so total island wide coverage has proved to be a problem and the provider is looking into alternatives. A recent press release has indicated their interest in a partnership with the local telco LIME.

The service uses a Yagi antenna to receive the encrypted broadcast, which in turn is then decrypted by the provider's set top box. The provider has faced the challenge of signal theft by pirates using modified DVB-C compatible receivers and PCI cards. Some of the most popular being the "Dreambox" manufactured in Germany to decode their signal which is based on Nagravision which is a conditional access control system developed by the Kudelski Group. In order to prevent such activity in August, 2006 the Government of Barbados stiffened the local Barbadian copyright laws, in addition to a strengthening of the laws on cable TV piracy. The CBC provider is planning for further circumvention of the Dream boxes in 2009.

In 2014, MCTV announced that it would begin carrying new channels such as MovieCity Action (now Star Action), MovieCity Hollywood (now Star Hits), AMC, KTLA, WGN, Disney, and the NBC Sports Network. They also introduced 20 HD channels, such as ABC, NBC, CBS & FOX and also released new PVR boxes. MCTV also introduced a new slogan, MCTV the Right Choice.

Multi-Choice TV also competes against the US-based direct broadcast satellite (DBS) service provider DirecTV in Barbados. The service uses the NTSC television format.

== See also ==
- Caribbean Broadcasting Corporation (CBC)
- Communications in Barbados
