= Pine Hill, Barbados =

Area in Saint Michael, Barbados

Coordinates: 13.1009°N 59.5833°W

Pine Hill (often simply called The Pine) is an area in Saint Michael, Barbados, part of the Greater Bridgetown metropolitan area. It is the location of the CBC Broadcasting studios and the Pine Hill Dairy.
