= Barbados Light and Power Company =

Electrical utility in Barbados

Barbados Light & Power Company Limited
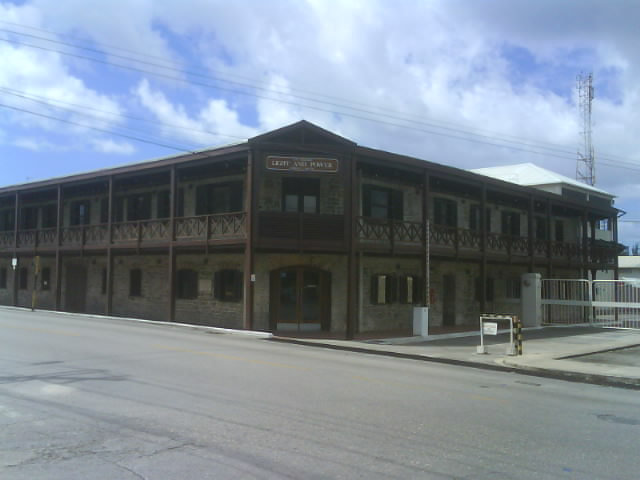
- BL&P's (Garrison) head office, Bay Street, St. Michael
- Founded: 17 June 1911
- Headquarters: Barbados

The Barbados Light & Power Company Limited (BL&P Co.) is a wholly owned subsidiary of Emera Caribbean and currently the sole electricity utility provider in the country of Barbados. It started operations on 17 June 1911. The company claims it has over 100,000 customers. The fuel provided is natural gas and fuel oil.

== Generation ==
The company operates three power generating plants:

- Two are located in the Parish of St. Michael: One situated north of the Deep Water Harbor, along the Mighty Grynner Highway, and a second on Bay Street, at The Garrison.
- A third is located in Seawell, Christ Church, at the Grantley Adams International Airport.

Other power generated substations were:

- the Belmont Road Substation in Belmont Road, St. Michael;
- the Central Substation in Haggatt Hall, St. Michael;
- the Kendall Hill Substation in Kendall Hill, Christ Church;
- the Maynards Substation in Maynards, St. Peter;
- the Whitepark Road Substation in Whitepark Road, St. Michael;
- the Carrington Substation in Carrington, near Hampton, St. Philip,
- the Carmichael Substation in Carmichael, St. George;
- the Arch Hall Substation in Arch Hall, St. Thomas;
- the Carlton Substation in Carlton Road, St. James;
- the Sion Hill Mini-substation in Springhead Road, Sion Hill, St James;
- the Regency Park Mini-substation in Regency Park, Bartletts, Christ Church;
- the Trents Substation in Trents, St. Lucy; and
- the Warrens Substation in Warrens, St. Michael.

== Current ==
Power is transmitted at 24 kV, which is then distributed at 11 kV and consumed at 115/200 volts or 115/230 volts (residential), 230/400 volts (commercial), or 11,000–24,900 volts for industry at a frequency of 50 hertz.

Electricity rates in Barbados are claimed to be some of the highest in the Caribbean. However, the company is currently in the process of negotiating a direct undersea pipeline for natural gas from Trinidad and Tobago through the Eastern Caribbean Gas Pipeline.

BL&P is also engaged in a long-term study of the feasibility of creating a wind farm off the north coast of Saint Lucy.

The Barbados Light & Power Company is a member of the Saint Lucia based Caribbean Electric Utility Services Corporation (CARILEC), and the Solar Electric Power Association (SEPA) based in Washington, DC, USA.

The Barbados Light & Power Company celebrated its 100th anniversary on 17 June 2011, with the slogan "Electricity: powering our nation since 1911."

== See also ==
- Reddy Kilowatt
- Mains electricity by country
- NEMA connector
- U.S. National Electrical Code
- List of companies listed on the Barbados Stock Exchange
