= Index of Barbados-related articles =

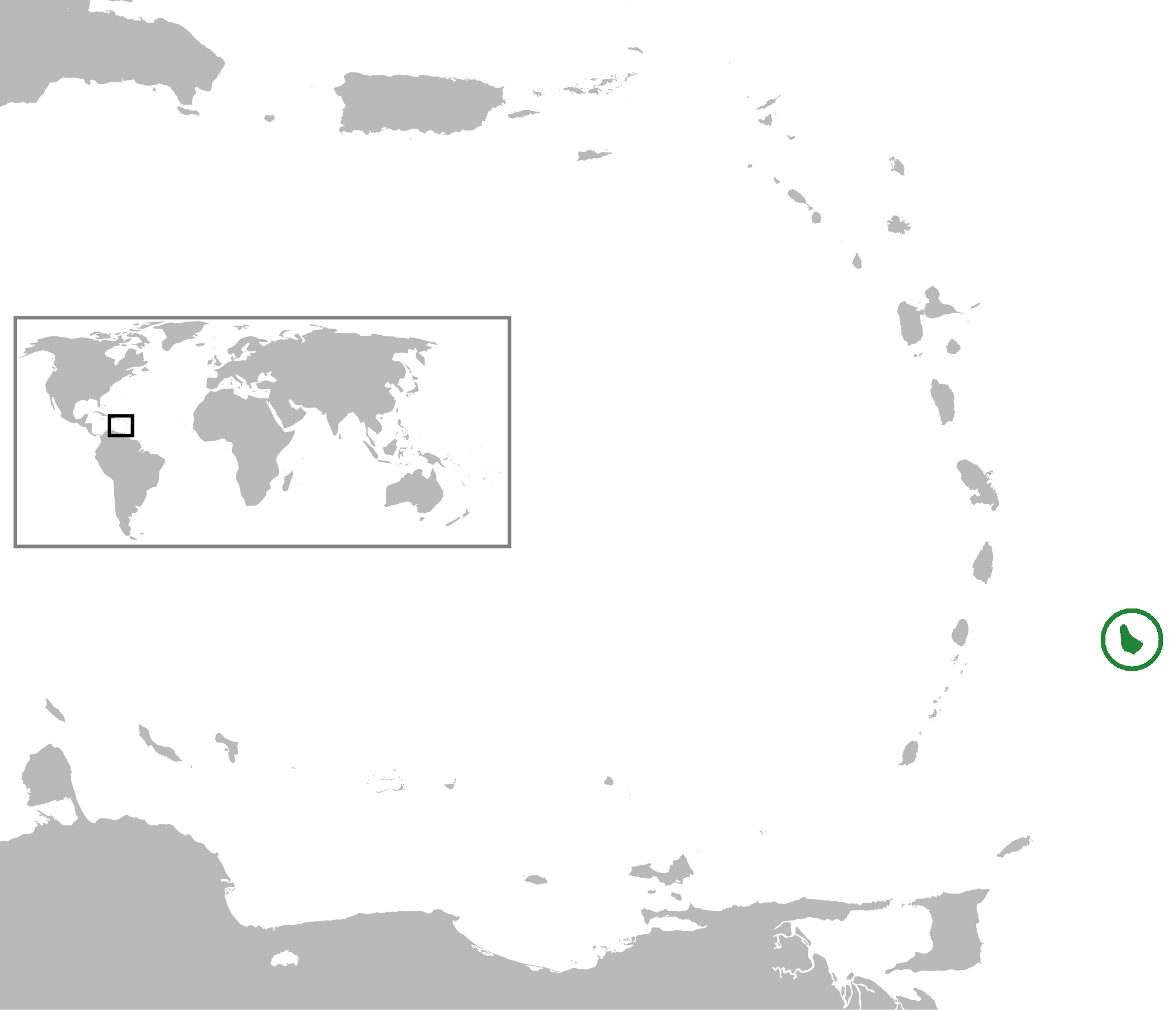
Location of Barbados in the Caribbean

The following is an alphabetical list of topics related to the nation of Barbados.

== 0–9 ==
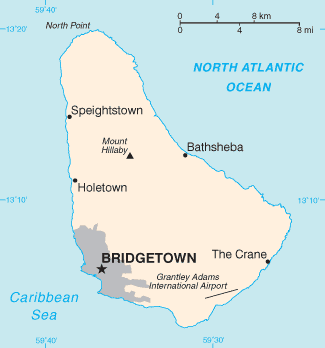
A map of Barbados

- .bb–Internet country code top-level domain for Barbados
- +1 246 (area code)
- 1898 Windward Islands Hurricane
- 3Ws Oval
- 2006 WGC-World Cup
- 2010 Barbados Premier Division
- 2011 Barbados Premier Division
- 2014 Barbados Premier Division
- 2014 Race of Champions
- 2015 Barbados Premier Division
- 2016 Barbados FA Cup
- 2016 Barbados Premier Division
- 2017 Barbados Premier League

== A ==
- ABC Highway
- Andromeda Gardens
- Anglican Church of Barbados
- Anglo-America
- Animal Flower Cave
- Architecture of Barbados
- Area code 246
- Army of Barbados
- Athletics Association of Barbados
- Atlantic Shores, Barbados
- Atlas of Barbados
- Attorney-General of Barbados
- Australia–Barbados relations

== B ==
- Bajan
- Bajan Creole
- Bajan stick licking
- Banks Barbados Brewery
- Bank holiday
- Banks Sports and Cultural Club
- Bannatyne, Barbados
- Barbadian Brazilians
- Barbadian British
- Barbadian Canadians
- Barbadian Chess Championship
- Barbadian dollar
- Barbadian elections
  - Barbadian general election, 1946
  - Barbadian general election, 1951
  - Barbadian general election, 1956
  - Barbadian general election, 1961
  - Barbadian general election, 1966
  - Barbadian general election, 1971
  - Barbadian general election, 1976
  - Barbadian general election, 1981
  - Barbadian general election, 1986
  - Barbadian general election, 1991
  - Barbadian general election, 1994
  - Barbadian general election, 1999
  - Barbadian general election, 2003
  - Barbadian general election, 2008
  - Barbadian general election, 2013
- Barbadian National Heroes
- Barbadian nationality law
- Barbadian passport
- Barbadians
- Barbados
- Barbados and CARICOM
- Barbados Association for Children With Intellectual Challenges
- Barbados at the World Aquatics Championships
  - Barbados at the 2011 World Aquatics Championships
  - Barbados at the 2013 World Aquatics Championships
  - Barbados at the 2015 World Aquatics Championships
  - Barbados at the 2017 World Aquatics Championships
- Barbados at the World Athletics Championships
  - Barbados at the 2009 World Championships in Athletics
  - Barbados at the 2011 World Championships in Athletics
  - Barbados at the 2013 World Championships in Athletics
  - Barbados at the 2017 World Championships in Athletics
- Barbados at the Commonwealth Games
  - Barbados at the 2006 Commonwealth Games
  - Barbados at the 2010 Commonwealth Games
  - Barbados at the 2014 Commonwealth Games
  - Barbados at the 2011 Commonwealth Youth Games
- Barbados at the Olympics
  - Barbados at the 1968 Summer Olympics
  - Barbados at the 1972 Summer Olympics
  - Barbados at the 1976 Summer Olympics
  - Barbados at the 1984 Summer Olympics
  - Barbados at the 1988 Summer Olympics
  - Barbados at the 1992 Summer Olympics
  - Barbados at the 1996 Summer Olympics
  - Barbados at the 2000 Summer Olympics
  - Barbados at the 2004 Summer Olympics
  - Barbados at the 2008 Summer Olympics
  - Barbados at the 2012 Summer Olympics
  - Barbados at the 2016 Summer Olympics
  - Barbados at the 2010 Summer Youth Olympics
  - Barbados at the 2014 Summer Youth Olympics
- Barbados at the Pan American Games
  - Barbados at the 1995 Pan American Games
  - Barbados at the 1999 Pan American Games
  - Barbados at the 2003 Pan American Games
  - Barbados at the 2011 Pan American Games
  - Barbados at the 2015 Pan American Games
- Barbados at the Paralympics
  - Barbados at the 2004 Summer Paralympics
  - Barbados at the 2008 Summer Paralympics
  - Barbados at the 2012 Summer Paralympics
- Barbados Bar Association
- Barbados Boy Scouts Association
- Barbados–Brazil relations
- Barbados–Canada relations
- Barbados Chamber Orchestra
- Barbados–China relations
- Barbados Coast Guard
- Barbados Community College
- Barbados Cricket Association
- Barbados Cricket Buckle
- Barbados Cycling Union
- Barbados Davis Cup team
- Barbados Defence Force
- Barbados Defence Force Sports Program
- Barbados Division One
- Barbados Fed Cup team
- Barbados Football Association
- Barbados–France Maritime Delimitation Agreement
- Barbados–France relations
- Barbados–Germany relations
- Barbados Gold Cup
- Barbados–Grenada relations
- Barbados–Guyana relations
- Barbados Independence Act 1966
- Barbados–India relations
- Barbados–Japan relations
- Barbados Jazz Festival
- Barbados Labour Party
- Barbados lottery
- Barbados men's national field hockey team
- Barbados men's national volleyball team
- Barbados Museum & Historical Society
- Barbados National Archives
- Barbados national basketball team
- Barbados national cricket team
- Barbados national football team
- Barbados national football team results
- Barbados national netball team
- Barbados National Oil Company Limited
- Barbados National Party
- Barbados National Pledge
- Barbados national rugby sevens team
- Barbados national rugby union team
- Barbados National Stadium
- Barbados National Trust
- Barbados nationality law
- Barbados–Nigeria relations
- Barbados Olympic Association
- Barbados passport
- Barbados – People's Republic of China relations
- Barbados Police Band
- Barbados Police Headquarters
- Barbados Police Service (BPS)
- Barbados Port Incorporated
- Barbados Postal Service
- Barbados Premier League
- Barbados Programme of Action
- Barbados rail
- Barbados Railway
- Barbados Red Cross Society
- Barbados Regiment
- Barbados Slave Code of 1661
- Barbados Stock Exchange
- Barbados–Suriname relations
- Barbados Tramway Company
- Barbados Transport Board
- Barbados Tridents
- Barbados – Trinidad and Tobago relations
- Barbados – United Kingdom relations
- Barbados–United States relations
- Barbados Water Authority
- Barbados Wildlife Reserve
- Barbados Workers' Union
- Barclays Park, Barbados
- Bath, Barbados
- Bathsheba, Barbados
- Battle off Barbados
- Baxters, Barbados
- Bayfield, Barbados
- Bayleys, Barbados
- Bel Air, Barbados
- Bellairs Research Institute
- Belleplaine
- Bentleys
- Bico Limited
- BIM
- Bissex
- Blades, Barbados
- Blades Hill
- Blue Waters, Barbados
- Boscobelle
- Bottom Bay
- Bowmanston
- Boxing Day
- Branchbury
- Breedy's, Barbados
- Brereton, Barbados
- Bridgetown – Capital of Barbados
- Bridgetown Heliport
- Bridgetown Market Street Fair
- Brittons Hill FC
- Bruce Vale
- Bruce Vale River
- Bushy Park, Barbados
- Bussa Emancipation Statue
- Bussa's rebellion

== C ==
- Cabinet of Barbados
- Call signs in Barbados
- Callenders
- Calypso music
- Cambridge, Barbados
- Canadian High Commission, Bridgetown
- Canadians of Barbadian origin
- Cane Vale
- Cannabis in Barbados
- Capital of Barbados: Bridgetown
- Caribbean
- Caribbean Basin Trade Partnership Act
- Caribbean Broadcasting Corporation (CBC)
- Caribbean360
- Caribbean Community (CARICOM)
- Caribbean Court of Justice (CCJ)
- Caribbean Sea
- Caribbean Tourism Organization
- CaribVision
- CARICOM Regional Organisation for Standards and Quality
- CarIFS
- Carlisle Bay, Barbados
- Carlton Cricket Club (Barbados)
- Carrington, Barbados
- Castle Grant, Barbados
- Categories:
  - Category:Barbados
    - Category:Attorneys-General of Barbados
    - Category:Barbadian people
    - Category:Barbados stubs
    - Category:Barbados-related lists
    - Category:Buildings and structures in Barbados
    - Category:Chief justices of Barbados
    - Category:Communications in Barbados
    - Category:Culture of Barbados
    - Category:Economy of Barbados
    - Category:Education in Barbados
    - Category:Environment of Barbados
    - Category:Geography of Barbados
    - Category:Government of Barbados
    - Category:Health in Barbados
    - Category:History of Barbados
    - Category:Law of Barbados
    - Category:Military of Barbados
    - Category:Politics of Barbados
    - Category:Society of Barbados
    - Category:Sport in Barbados
    - Category:Transport in Barbados
  - commons:Category:Barbados
- Cathedral Church of Saint Michael and All Angels
- Catholic Church in Barbados
- Cave Bay, Barbados
- Cave Hill, Saint Lucy, Barbados
- Cave Hill, Saint Michael, Barbados
- CBC Radio (Barbados)
- CBC TV 8 (Barbados)
- Central Bank of Barbados
- Chalky Mount
- Chase Vault
- Chattel house
- Checker Hall
- Chefette
- Cherry Grove, Barbados
- Cherry Tree Hill, Barbados
- Chief Justice of Barbados
- Chimborazo, Barbados
- Christ Church, Barbados
- Christ Church Parish Church
- Christianity in Barbados
- Church Village, Barbados
- City of Bridgetown (Barbados Parliament constituency)
- Classical/Pops Festival
- Clement Payne Movement
- Clifton Hill Moravian Church
- Climate of Barbados

The Coat of arms of Barbados

- Coat of arms of Barbados
- Codrington College
- Codrington School (Barbados)
- Combermere School
- Commonwealth of Nations
- Commonwealth realm of Barbados
- Communications in Barbados
- Congaline
- Congaline Carnival
- Congress of Trade Unions and Staff Associations of Barbados
- Congress Party (Barbados)
- Conset Bay
- Constant, Barbados
- Constituency Councils
- Constitution of Barbados
- Constitution River
- Continental island
- Coo-coo
- Corporate Affairs and Intellectual Property Office (CAIPO)
- Counterpart Caribbean
- Crab Hill, Barbados
- Crane Bay, Barbados
- Crop over
- Cubana Flight 455
- Cuisine of Barbados
- Culture of Barbados

== D ==
- David Comissiong
- David Thompson
- Democratic Labour Party
- Demographics of Barbados
- DGM Barbados Open
- Diamond Corner
- Digicel Play
- Diocese of Barbados
- Discover Barbados TV
- Districts of Barbados
- Drax Hall Estate

== E ==
- Economy of Barbados
- Eden Stars FC
- Education in Barbados
- Elections in Barbados
- Ellerton, Barbados
- Emancipation Day
- Embassy of Barbados in Washington, D.C.
- Empire Cricket Club
- Empire Theatre
- English colonization of the Americas
- English in Barbados
- English language
- Erdiston Teachers' Training College
- Errol Barrow
- Errol Barrow Day

== F ==
The Flag of Barbados

- Falernum
- Fauna of Barbados
- Flying fish
- Flag of Barbados
- Flora of Barbados
- Flower Forest
- Fontabelle, Saint Michael, Barbados
- Football in Barbados
- Foreign relations of Barbados
- Francia Great House
- Frank Leslie Walcott
- Freemasonry in Barbados
- French Village, Barbados
- Freshwater Bay, Barbados
- Foul Bay, Barbados
- Foundation School (Barbados)
- Fourhill
- Four Roads, Barbados

== G ==
- Garfield Sobers Gymnasium
- Garrison Historic Area
- Garrison Savannah
- Garrison Savannah Racetrack
- Geography of Barbados
- George Washington House (Barbados)
- The Girl Guides Association of Barbados
- Goodland, Barbados
- Gospelfest
- Government of Barbados
- Governor-General of Barbados
- Governors of Barbados
- Governors-General
- Graeme Hall Nature Sanctuary
- (Sir) Grantley Adams
- Grantley Adams International Airport
- Grave Yard, Barbados
- Greenland, Barbados
- Greenland Landfill, Barbados
- Gross domestic product
- Gun Hill Signal Station

== H ==
- Harrison College (Barbados)
- Harrison's Cave
- Hastings, Barbados
- Health in Barbados
- Heroes' Day
- High Commission of Barbados, London
- High Commission of Barbados in Ottawa
- High Commission of Canada in Bridgetown
- Hillaby, Barbados
- History of Barbados
- HM Glendairy Prison
- Holetown
- Holder's Festival
- Hopewell, Christ Church
- Hopewell, Saint Thomas
- House of Assembly of Barbados
- Hugh Wooding Law School
- Human trafficking in Barbados
- Hunte's Gardens
- hurricanes, List of
- Husbands, Barbados

== I ==
- Ilaro Court
- Immigration
- "In Plenty and In Time of Need"
- Indian River (Barbados)
- Indians in Barbados
- Industrial heritage of Barbados
- Institute of Chartered Accountants of Barbados
- International Organization for Standardization (ISO)
  - ISO 3166-1 alpha-2 country code for Barbados: BB
  - ISO 3166-1 alpha-3 country code for Barbados: BRB
  - ISO 3166-2:BB region codes for Barbados
- International rankings of Barbados
- Internet in Barbados
- IPSC Barbados
- Irish immigration to Barbados
- Islam
- Islands of Barbados:
  - Barbados island
  - Culpepper Island
  - Pelican Island (Barbados) (now absorbed into Barbados)

== J ==
- Jesus Army Productions
- Joes River
- Judiciary of Barbados

== K ==
- Kendal, Barbados
- Kensington Oval
- Knight or Dame of St. Andrew (Barbados)

== L ==
- Lamberts, Barbados
- Landship
- Languages of Barbados
- Law enforcement in Barbados
- Hamble James Leacock
- Leeward Islands Airline Pilots Association
- Lesser Antilles
- LGBT rights in Barbados
- Lists related to Barbados:
  - Diplomatic missions of Barbados
  - List of airports in Barbados
  - List of archives in Barbados
  - List of Barbadian companies
  - List of Barbadian cricketers
  - List of Barbadian flags
  - List of Barbadian organisations
  - List of Barbados-related topics
  - List of Barbados hurricanes
  - List of beaches in Barbados
  - List of birds of Barbados
  - List of cathedrals in Barbados
  - List of cities in Barbados
  - List of cities, towns and villages in Barbados
  - List of Colonial Secretaries of Barbados
  - List of companies listed on the Barbados Stock Exchange
  - List of companies of Barbados
  - List of countries by GDP (nominal)
  - List of diplomatic missions in Barbados
  - List of diplomatic missions of Barbados
  - List of Barbadians
  - List of flag bearers for Barbados at the Olympics
  - List of football clubs in Barbados
  - List of governors of Barbados
  - List of governors-general of Barbados
  - List of high commissioners of the United Kingdom to Barbados
  - List of highways in Barbados
  - List of hospitals in Barbados
  - List of islands of Barbados
  - List of lighthouses in Barbados
  - List of locations in Barbados with an English name
  - List of mammals of Barbados
  - List of museums in Barbados
  - List of newspapers in Barbados
  - List of parliamentary constituencies of Barbados
  - List of people on stamps of Barbados
  - List of plantations in Barbados
  - List of political parties in Barbados
  - List of prime ministers of Barbados
  - List of radio stations in Barbados
  - List of rivers of Barbados
  - List of schools in Barbados
  - List of universities and colleges in Barbados
  - List of universities in Barbados
  - List of years in Barbados
- Lloyd Erskine Sandiford Conference And Cultural Centre (less formally: Lloyd Erskine Sandiford Centre)
- Long Bay, Barbados
- Long Pond River (Barbados)
- Lord Radio & the Bimshire Boys

== M ==
- Mangrove, Barbados
- Maple Club
- Marchfield
- Mártires de Barbados Stadium
- Maycock's Bay, Barbados
- Media in Barbados
- Metrication in Barbados
- Miami Beach, Barbados
- Mile and a Quarter
- Military of Barbados
- Ministries and agencies of the Barbados government
- Ministry of Foreign Affairs, Foreign Trade and International Business (Barbados)
- Ministry of Labour (Barbados)
- Miss Barbados
- Monarchy of Barbados
- Morgan Lewis Windmill
- Mount Gay Rum
- Mount Hillaby
- Multi-Choice TV (Barbados)
- Music history of Barbados
- Music of Barbados

== N ==
- National anthem of Barbados
- National Cultural Foundation
- National Democratic Party
- National Heroes' Day
- National Heroes Square
- National Library Service of Barbados
- National symbols of Barbados
- National Union of Public Workers
- Nationality law of Barbados
- Needham's Point Lighthouse
- Notre Dame SC

== O ==
- Official Gazette
- Oistins
- Oistins Bay
- Oistins Fish Festival
- Operation Red Dog
- Order of Barbados
- Our Lady Queen of the Universe Church, Barbados
- Outline of Barbados
- Owen Arthur
- Oxnards Crescent

== P ==
- Palmetto Bay, Barbados
- Paradise FC (Barbados)
- Parishes of Barbados
- Parkinson Memorial Secondary School (Barbados)
- Parliament Buildings (Barbados)
- Parliament of Barbados
- Paynes Bay, Barbados
- People's Empowerment Party
- People's Political Alliance
- People's Progressive Movement
- Permanent Representative of Barbados to the United Nations in New York
- Pickwick Cricket Club
- Pico Teneriffe (Barbados)
- Pie Corner
- Pine Hill, Barbados
- Pinelands United SC
- Plantation Reserve
- Platinum Coast
- Politics of Barbados
- Port of Bridgetown
- Port Saint Charles
- Postage stamps and postal history of Barbados
- Postal codes in Barbados
- President of Barbados
- Pride of Gall Hill FC
- Prime Minister of Barbados
- Prime ministers of Barbados
- Project HARP
- Public Broadcast Service
- Public holidays in Barbados

== Q ==
- Quality FM (Barbados)
- Queen Elizabeth Hospital
- Queen's College (Barbados)
- Queen's Park, Bridgetown (Barbados)
- Queen's Personal Barbadian Flag

== R ==
- Ragged Point, Barbados
- REDjet
- Redleg
- Religion in Barbados
- Republic Bank
- Republicanism in Barbados
- Revenue stamps of Barbados
- Rihanna
- Ringbang
- Rock Hall, Barbados
- Roman Catholic Diocese of Bridgetown
- Rugby union in Barbados
- Rupee (musician)
- Ryan Brathwaite

== S ==
- Saint Andrew, Barbados
- Saint Clement's Church, Barbados
- Saint George, Barbados
- Saint James, Barbados
- Saint John, Barbados
- Saint Joseph, Barbados
- Saint Joseph Hospital
- Saint Lawrence Gap
- Saint Lucy, Barbados
- Saint Martins, Barbados
- Saint Michael, Barbados
- Saint Peter, Barbados
- Saint Philip, Barbados
- Saint Thomas, Barbados
- Sam Lords, Barbados
- Samuel Jackman Prescod Institute of Technology
- Sandy Lane (resort)
- Scarborough, Barbados
- Scotland Formation, Barbados
- Scouting and Guiding in Barbados
- Senate of Barbados
- Sharon Moravian Church
- Sheraton Centre Mall
- Sherbourne, Barbados
- Sherbourne Conference Centre (see Lloyd Erskine Sandiford Conference And Cultural Centre)
- Shipping Association of Barbados
- Silver Sands FC
- Six Cross Roads, Barbados
- Six Men's Bay, Barbados
- Soca music
- Solar Dynamics
- South Point Lighthouse
- Speightstown
- Sport in Barbados
- Spouge
- St. Catherine Sport and Social Club
- St. James Church, Barbados
- St. John's Parish Church, Barbados
- St. Margaret's Church, Barbados
- St Nicholas Abbey
- St. Patrick's Cathedral, Bridgetown
- State House, Barbados
- States headed by Elizabeth II
- Statutory boards of the Barbadian Government
- Sunbeach
- Sunbury, Barbados
- Supreme Court of Barbados

== T ==
- Table of precedence for Barbados
- Technico (Barbados football club)
- Telecommunications in Barbados
- The Alexandra School
- The Barbados Advocate
- The Castle, Barbados
- The Crane, Barbados
- The Daily Nation
- The Lodge School
- The St. Michael School
- Third Border Initiative
- Three Houses
- Timeline of Barbadian history
- Tourism in Barbados
- Transport in Barbados
- Treaty of Chaguaramas
- Tuk band
- Turner's Hall Woods
- Two Mile Hill, Barbados

== U ==
- United Nations, member state since 1966
- United States-Barbados relations
- United States Naval Facility, Barbados
- University of the West Indies
- University of the West Indies, Cave Hill Campus
- UWI Blackbirds FC

== V ==
- Vehicle registration plates of Barbados
- Venture, Barbados
- Verandah
- Visa policy of Barbados
- Visa requirements for Barbadian citizens
- Voice of Barbados

== W ==
- Wanderers Cricket Club
- Wanstead, Barbados
- Warrens, Barbados
- Washington University of Barbados
- Welches, Barbados
- West Indian cricket team
- West Indians
- West Indies Federal Archives Centre
- West Terrace
- Weymouth Wales FC
- White Barbadian
- White Hill, Barbados
- WIBISCO
- Wikimedia Atlas of Barbados
- Wildey
- Wildey Gymnasium
- Woodbourne, Barbados
- Workhall, Barbados
- Workers Party of Barbados

== Y ==
- YMPC Cricket Club
- Youth Milan FC

== Z ==
- ZR (bus)

== See also ==
- Commonwealth of Nations
- List of Caribbean-related topics#Barbados
- List of international rankings
- Lists of country-related topics
- Outline of Barbados
- Outline of geography
- Outline of North America
- United Nations
