= List of companies of Barbados =

Location of Barbados

Barbados is a sovereign island country in the Lesser Antilles, in the Caribbean. Despite being classified as an Atlantic island, Barbados is considered to be a part of the Caribbean, where it is ranked as a leading tourist destination. Forty percent of the tourists come from the UK, with the US and Canada making up the next large groups of visitors to the island. The Government of Barbados also owns a handful of state-owned companies some of which are outlined below.

== Notable firms ==
This list includes notable companies with primary headquarters located in the country. The industry and sector follow the Industry Classification Benchmark taxonomy. Organizations which have ceased operations are included and noted as defunct.

Notable companies Status: P=Private, S=State; A=Active, D=Defunct
Name	Industry	Sector	Headquarters	Founded	Notes	Status	
Bajan Helicopters	Industrials	Delivery services	Bridgetown	1989	Air transport services, defunct 2009	P	D
Banks Barbados Brewery	Consumer goods	Brewers	Wildey	1961	Brewery	P	A
The Barbados Advocate	Consumer services	Publishing	Bridgetown	1895	Newspaper	P	A
Barbados Ice Cream Company	Consumer goods	Food products	Bridgetown	1901	Frozen desserts, food products	P	A
Barbados Light and Power Company	Utilities	Conventional electricity	Bridgetown	1911	Power utility, part of Emera (Canada)	P	A
Barbados National Oil Company Limited	Oil & gas	Exploration & production	Woodbourne	1982	State-owned energy	S	A
Barbados Stock Exchange	Financials	Investment services	Bridgetown	1987	Primary exchange	S	A
Barbados Water Authority	Utilities	Water	Saint Michael	1980	State-owned utility	S	A
CariAccess	Telecommunications	Fixed line telecommunications	Bridgetown	1999	Internet service provider, defunct 2007	P	D
Caribbean Broadcasting Corporation	Consumer services	Broadcasting & entertainment	Bridgetown	1963	State-owned TV and radio	P	A
Caribbean Media Corporation	Consumer services	Broadcasting & entertainment	Bridgetown	2000	Television content	P	A
CarIFS	Financials	Financial services	Bridgetown	1999	Money movement	P	A
Central Bank of Barbados	Financials	Banks	Bridgetown	1972	Formal central bank	S	A
Chefette	Consumer services	Restaurants & bars	Bridgetown	1972	Fast-food restaurant chain	P	A
CIBC FirstCaribbean International Bank	Financials	Banks	Warrens	2005	Bank, part of CIBC (Canada)	P	A
Columbus Communications	Telecommunications	Fixed line telecommunications	Bridgetown	2004	Part of Liberty Global	P	A
The Daily Nation	Consumer services	Publishing	Bridgetown	1973	Newspaper, part of ONE Caribbean Media (Trinidad and Tobago)	P	A
Foursquare Rum Distillery	Consumer goods	Distillers	Saint Philip	1995	Distillery	P	A
Ice Records	Consumer services	Broadcasting & entertainment	Bayleys	1974	Record label	P	A
Jesus Army Productions	Consumer services	Broadcasting & entertainment	Cave Hill	2003	Performing arts	P	A
Mount Gay Rum	Consumer goods	Distillers & vintners	Bridgetown	1703	Distilleries (rum), part of Rémy Cointreau (France)	P	A
Ozone Wireless	Telecommunications	Mobile telecommunications	Bridgetown	2017	Privately held	P	A
REDjet	Consumer services	Airlines	Bridgetown	2010	Airline, defunct 2012	P	D
Solar Dynamics	Consumer goods	Durable household products	Bridgetown	1972	Solar hot-water heaters	P	A
Starcom Network	Consumer services	Broadcasting & entertainment	Wildey	1935	Radio broadcasting group, part of ONE Caribbean Media (Trinidad & Tobago)	P	A
Sunbeach	Telecommunications	Fixed line telecommunications	Bridgetown	1995	Internet service provider, defunct 2013	P	D
TeleBarbados	Telecommunications	Fixed line telecommunications	Bridgetown	2006	Telecommunications, now a part of Cable & Wireless Communications	P	A
Trans Island Air 2000	Consumer services	Airlines	Christ Church	1982	Airline, defunct 2004	P	D
Voice of Barbados	Consumer services	Broadcasting & entertainment	Bridgetown	1981	Radio, part of Starcom Network	P	A
West Indies Rum Distillery	Consumer goods	Distillers	Bridgetown	1893	Distillery	P	A
West Indies Sugar & Trading Company	Consumer goods	Food products	Bridgetown	2008	Sugar	P	A
WIBISCO	Consumer goods	Food products	Bridgetown	1910	Food products, subsidiary of Bermudez Biscuit Company Limited (Trinidad and Tobago)	P	A

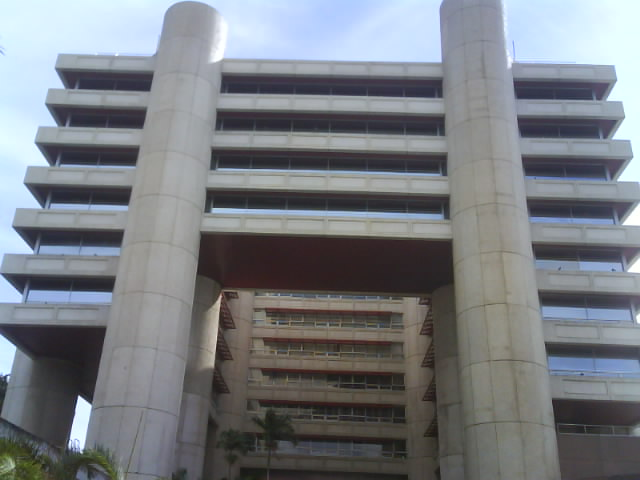
The Central Bank of Barbados in Bridgetown

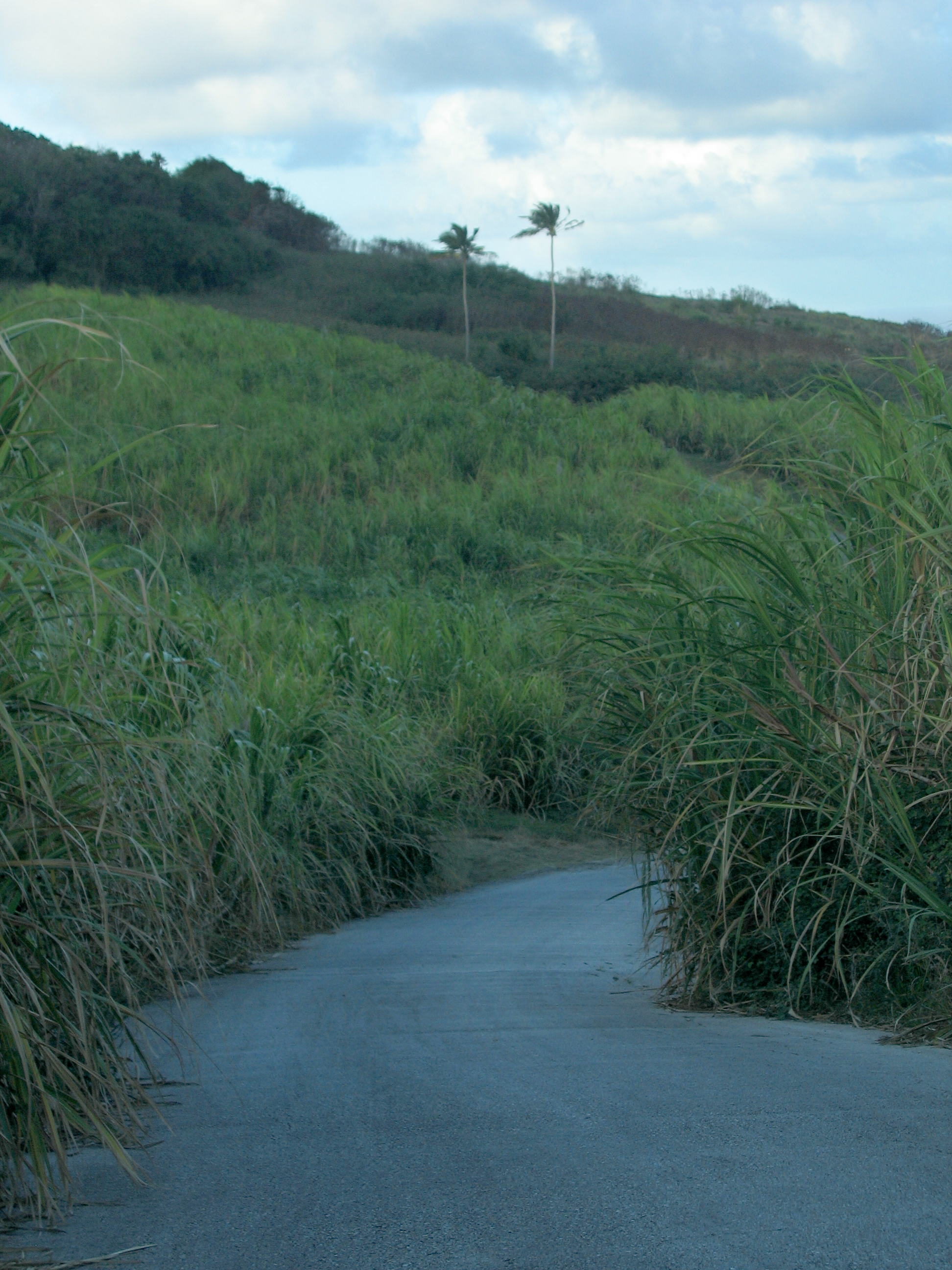
Sugar cane growing in Saint Andrew

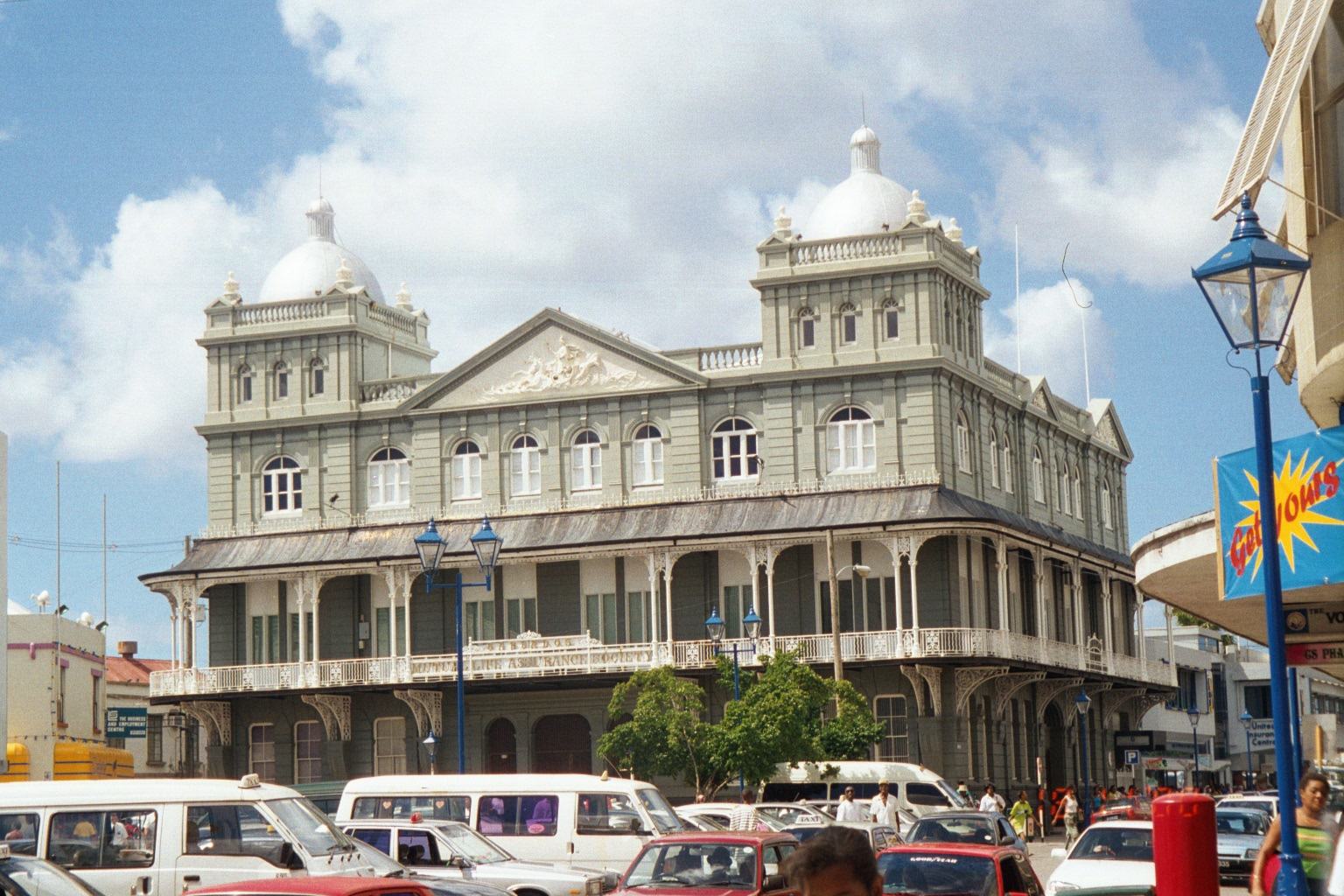
The Mutual Life Assurance building in Bridgetown

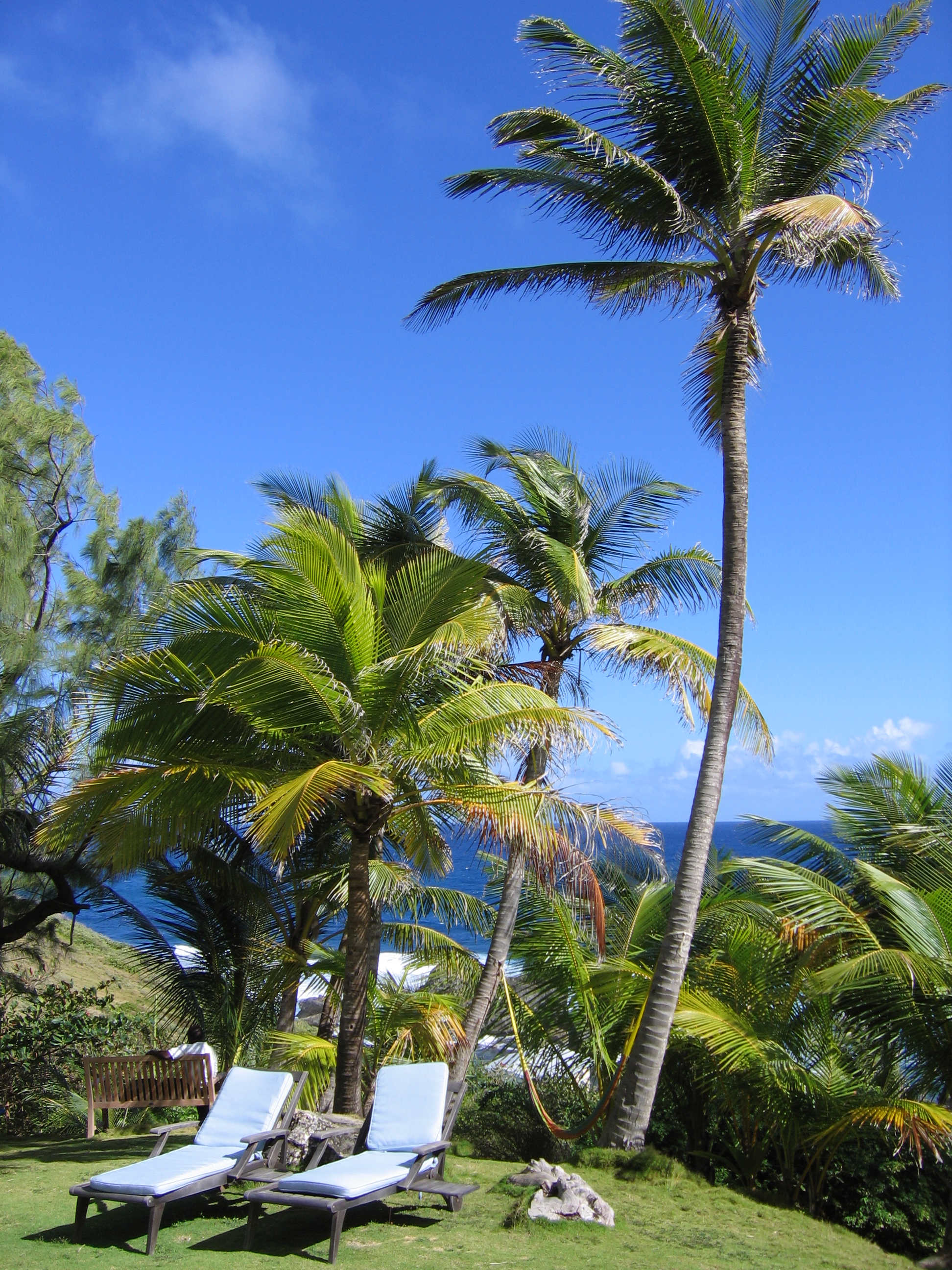
Tourist resort in Bathsheba, Saint Joseph

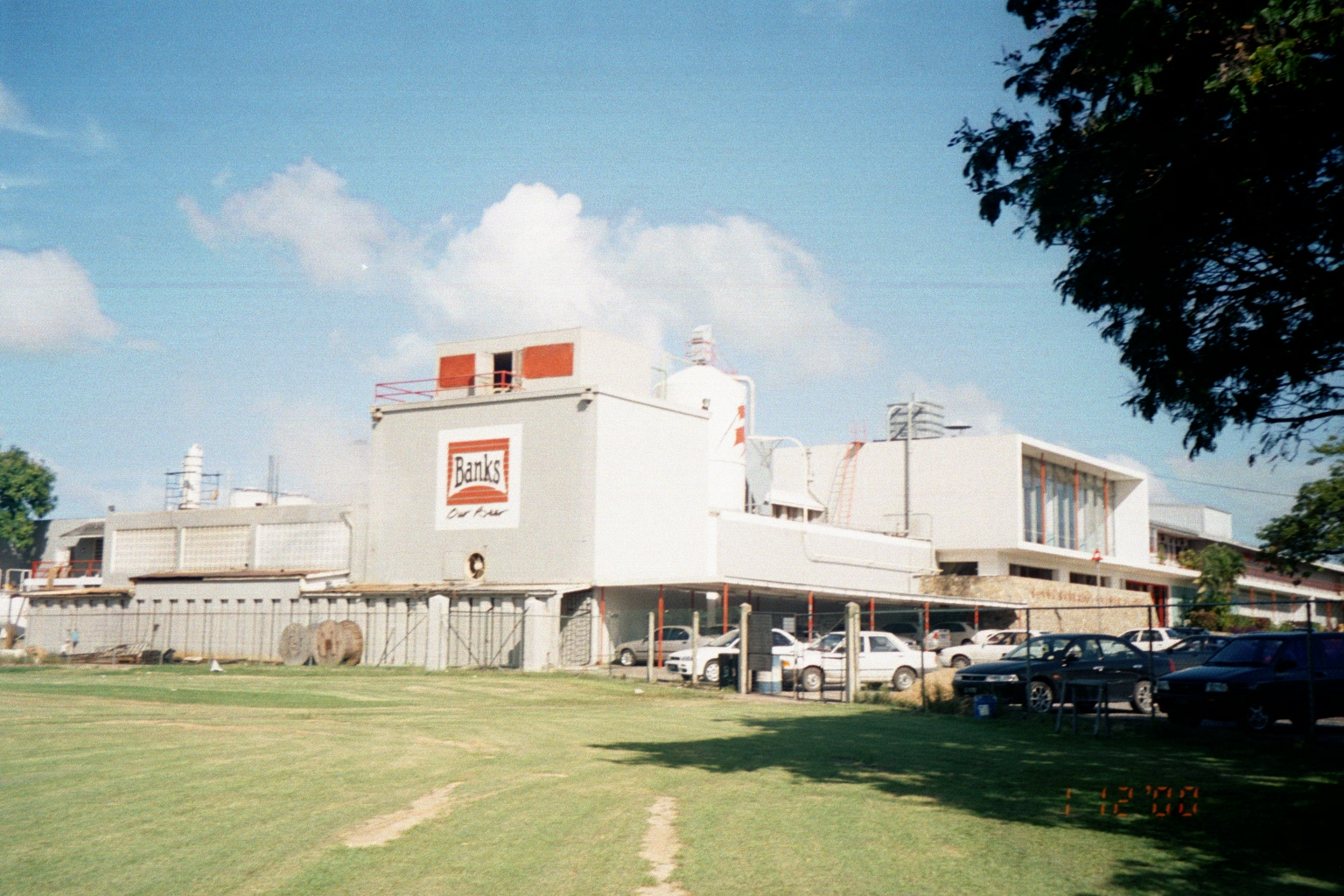
Banks Barbados Brewery in Saint Michael, Barbados
