= List of Barbadian organisations =

This is a list of international and local organisations based in Barbados.

== International organisations ==
- Caribbean Centre of Excellence for Sustainable Livelihoods (COESL)
- Caribbean Conservation Association (CCA)
- Caribbean Development Bank (CDB)
- Caribbean Disaster Emergency Response Agency (CDERA)
- Caribbean Examinations Council (CXC)
- Caribbean Regional Environmental Programme (CREP)
- Caribbean Regional Negotiating Machinery (CRNM)
- Caribbean Tourism Organisation (CTO)
- CARICOM Regional Organisation for Standards and Quality (CROSQ)
- Caribbean Youth Environment Network (CYEN)

== Local organisations ==
- Barbados Association for Children With Intellectual Challenges
- Barbados Association of Non-Governmental Organisations (BANGO)
- Barbados Amateur Basketball Association (BABA)
- Barbados Amateur Swimming Association (BASA)
- Barbados Auto Racing League (BARL)
- Barbados Bar Association (BBA)
- Barbados Cancer Society (BCS)
- Barbados Chamber of Commerce and Industry (BCCI)
- Barbados Chess Federation (BCF)
- Barbados Employers' Confederation (BEC)
- Barbados Football Association (BFA)
- Barbados Hotel and Tourism Association (BHTA)
- Barbados Institute of Management and Productivity (BIMAP)
- Barbados International Business Association (BIBA)
- Barbados Manufacturers' Association (BMA)
- Barbados Olympic Association (BOA)
- Barbados Sailing Association (BSA)
- Barbados Squash Rackets Association (BSRA)
- Institute of Chartered Accountants of Barbados (ICAB)
