= Scouting and Guiding in Barbados =

Scouting and Guiding movement in Barbados

The Scout and Guide movement in Barbados is served by

- The Girl Guides Association of Barbados, member of the World Association of Girl Guides and Girl Scouts
- Barbados Boy Scouts Association, member of the World Organization of the Scout Movement
