= Statutory boards of the Barbadian Government =

The statutory boards of the Barbados Government are organisations that have been given authority to perform certain functions in society. They usually report to one specific ministry.

- Accreditation Council, The
- Archives Advisory Committee, The
- Barbados Agricultural Development and Marketing Corporation (BADMC)
- Barbados Bar Association - created by the Barbados Bar Association Act of 1940.
- Barbados Industrial Development Corporation (BIDC)
- Barbados Museum & Historical Society (BMHS) Council
- Barbados Port Incorporated (BPI)
- Barbados Tourism Industry Corporation
- Barbados Water Authority (BWA)
- Caribbean Broadcasting Corporation (CBC)
- Commission for Pan-African Affairs, The (CPAA) – Established 28 November 1998
- Film Censorship Board, The
- National Advisory Commission on Education, The
- National Assistance Board, The
- National Cultural Foundation (NCF), The
- Queen Elizabeth Hospital (QEH), The
- Rural Development Commission (RDC)
- Securities Commission, The
- Town and Country Planning
- Urban Development Commission (UDC)
