= Counterpart Caribbean =

Future Centre Trust
- Formation: 1996, The late Dr Colin Hudson
- Purpose: Environment and sustainable development and Environmental education
- Region served: Barbados and the Caribbean
- Key people: Mrs Vivian-Anne Gittens (chairman) Mrs Cherice Gibson (Executive Director)
- Website: www.futurecentretrust.org

Future Centre Trust (FCT), also known previously as Counterpart Caribbean, is an environmental organization based on the Caribbean island of Barbados. FCT aims to work with wider organizations such as UNCED to concentrate on economic and tourist activity in Barbados that is based on sustainable development for future generations on the island, the region and the wider world. As of September 2009, the organisation is chaired by Mrs Vivian-Anne Gittens and pays specific attention to the education of children in the environment of Barbados.

== Significance and focus ==
The Future Centre Trust is acknowledged in Barbados as an important group for sustainable development on the island, and is a significant contributor to political decisions over environmental issues in Barbados as they are actively involved in the process of decision-making and working on multi-sectoral committees. The Future Centre Trust is particularly involved in issues such as the regulation, proposal and planning of eco-farming, permaculture, composting to create a more efficient waste scheme on the island, alternative energy, gray water reuse, and other environmental development issues.

== History ==
The Centre was established in 1996 following the 1994 UN Conference on Sustainable Development of Small Island Developing States, hosted by Barbados. It began as an initial seventeen-day exhibition entitled "Village of Hope" and it came under the patronage of the Governor General, and later under the President of the Caribbean Development Bank (CDB). More than 1,000 volunteers collaborated to build the initial environmental village which displayed 3,000 exhibits during the conference. The massive success of the display which was attended by 40,000 people inspired one of the organisers, a local agronomist, the late Colin Hudson, to take the matter further and pursue a permanent environmental group and exhibition centre. Hudson contacted the late Dame Nita Barrow to propose the new trust and it was given the seal of approval. In 1996, six trustees and a membership board of eight established the Future Centre Trust and the physical location of the Future Centre, inspired by the success of the exhibition. On establishment, its official declared mission was "to create a permanent stimulus to enhance the quality of life in Barbados and eventually establish Barbados as a role model in the fight to save our planet".

In 1998, the Future Centre conducted a project in collaboration with the Recycling Council of Alberta in Canada, a project which explored recycling technology. They have also helped funding of the Dominica Conservation Association.

In January 2000, the trust was contacted by Counterpart International, the sustainable development organization based in Washington, D.C. and an international link was created with the association. By May 2001, the trust had become fully incorporated into the Counterpart Caribbean organisation which operated for some eight further years until December 2009.

Between May 17 and 20, 2007, Counterpart Caribbean met in San Juan, Puerto Rico, with environmental groups in the wider area of the Americas with groups from North America and elsewhere in the Caribbean to discuss sustainable tourism. A number of notable figures in the Caribbean region attended the event including Chairman of the Caribbean Tourism Organisation (CTO), Senator Allen Chastanet, who is the current Minister of Tourism and Civil Aviation in St. Lucia, Puerto Rico Tourism Company's executive director, Terestella González Denton, and the president of the Caribbean Hotel Association (CHA), Peter Odle.

Together with the Centre for Resource Management and Environmental Studies (CERMES) of the University of the West Indies, and the Sustainable Grenadines Project (SGP), the Counterpart Caribbean group also successfully implemented the Grenadines Water Taxi Project transboundary planning workshop in Carriacou in St. Vincent and the Grenadines. The project was primarily funded by the Global Environmental Facility, with small grants from The European Commission.

== Function ==
The Future Centre Trust operates in what they term as the "Initiatives of Hope". The trust has a number of initiatives, ranging from weekly national and local newspaper articles, radio interviews, school seminars and focused presentations, to meetings with government councils, operatives and other NGOs at ranging levels. The organization participated in a regular column focused on environmental matters in the magazine "Select Barbados", up until its cessation of business in May 2009. The magazine was published monthly and the organization had featured in the publication for the year of April 2008 until May 2009.

The Trust relies on donations and volunteers to keep it operating and to enable projects to be developed and undertaken. They welcome contributions from individuals and corporate entities of time and/or finance as appropriate.

The Trust has paid special attention to educating the important people of the future, the children, about the environment. Over the years it has held a notable exhibition centre located at Edge Hill, St. Thomas Parish in the Edgehill Plantation House. The centre is open for viewing by appointment, for a nominal charge. The Centre is dedicated to educating children and tourists about ecological science and the importance of conservation for future generations and in doing so raises several aspects of the social, cultural, economic and spiritual aspects of Barbados. The displays provide a number of exhibits demonstrating ecological footprint for example, eco-farming, alternative energy types, water conservation and has a number of plants and a herb garden. The exhibits include practical demonstrations on the loss of biological diversity, global warming, genetic engineering of food, nature conservation, fresh water access, sustainable tourism, coastal erosion and many other environmental issues. The group has been highly active in organising and collaborating with other groups to set up various workshops across the Caribbean islands in a diversity of different environmental issues. In November 2008, the organisation along with the Commonwealth Foundation, the Sandwatch Foundation, and the Barbados Youth Environment Programme provided a workshop entitled "“Youth and Climate Change: Cool Youth Leading the Way.” on climate change which involved a high number of the Caribbean islands including Bahamas, Barbados, British Virgin Islands, Dominica, Guyana, Jamaica, St. Kitts and Nevis, St. Lucia, St. Vincent and the Grenadines, and Trinidad and Tobago.” Counterpart Caribbean therefore considers it very important to work closely together with other environmental groups and the different governments and companies of the Caribbean to form alliances to increase their leeway on the environmental agenda.

The group is also very active in recycling in Barbados and works with several notable companies in Barbados to commit to recycling, especially plastics. The organization strongly encourage islanders to leave their plastic waste and to use more environmentally friendly shopping bags following the government research that in 1998 Barbadians were using over 78 000 000 plastic bags annually and was predicted to be over a billion by 2004. Some supermarket chains in Barbados are working with the group to use degradable plastic bags although others refuse to join the scheme.

== Programmes ==
The CoRe Network (or Community Recycling Network) was established in 2010 with funding initially from the Coca-Cola Foundation, and subsequently from the Peter Moore's Barbados Trust and the Embassy of the United States (Barbados and the Eastern Caribbean). The programme teaches local communities, especially school groups, to bring their clean recyclables together at a central point for collection and payment by local recycling brokers.

The Green Business Barbados Programme is funded by a grant from the Inter American Development Bank. The project aims to give businesses the framework to "green" their organization and receive certification.

The book Bri and Luk - Friends in Times of Changing Climates, written by former Future Centre Trust Administrative Director Nicole Garofano, aims to inform students ages 9 and 10 about the impact of climate change on small island developing states such as Barbados and surrounding Caribbean islands. A subsequent book - Book 2 - was developed for younger children, along with a puppet show that toured 30 schools in 2011. Here the story of Luk the polar bear unfolds. Luk comes to the Caribbean with his friend Bri the hummingbird to learn from the local animals and children how climate change is beginning to affect them. Copies of these books have been provided to every primary school in Barbados as a class set, with the hopes the students will engage in initial learning about climate change and its effects both locally and globally.
