= Long Bay =

Long Bay may refer to:

- Long Bay, Barbados
- Long Bay, Ontario, Canada
- Long Bay, New Zealand, a suburb of Auckland
- Long Bay Beach, in Manchester Parish Jamaica
- Long Bay Beach (Portland Parish, Jamaica), in Portland Parish, Jamaica
- Long Bay Correctional Centre, New South Wales, Australia
- Grand Strand or Long Bay, a stretch of beaches along the coast of South Carolina, U.S.
- Long Bay in North Anguilla
