= List of newspapers in Barbados =

This is a list of newspapers in Barbados. Older issues of Barbadian newspapers can be found in the British Newspaper Archive repository.

== Daily ==
- Barbados Today
- The Barbados Advocate – Bridgetown
- The Daily Nation – Bridgetown

== Special ==
- Hansard – publication of the Parliamentary proceedings in Barbados prior to the Government Printing Office
- The Official Gazette of Barbados (Bridgetown) – publication of the Barbados Government Printing Office

== News websites ==
- Caribbean360 – Bridgetown
- Caribbean Broadcasting Corporation – Bridgetown
- Caribbean News Agency (CANA) – Bridgetown

== Defunct ==
- Barbadian
- Barbados Agricultural Reporter
- Barbados Gazette - Barbados' first newspaper, established 1731.
- Barbados Globe & Colonial Advocate
- Barbados Mercury
- Barbados Recorder
- Barbados Standard
- Barbados Times
- The Beacon
- Bridgetown Gazette
- Caribbean Week
- The General Intelligence
- The Investigator
- The Penny Paper
- Pepper Punch
- Saturday Review
- The Sentinel
- The Small Report
- Times
- The Torch
- Truth
- Weekly Illustrated Paper
- Weekly Recorder
- The West India Magazine
- West Indian

== See also ==
- List of newspapers
- Media in Barbados
