= Cariaccess Communications =

Defunct telecommunications company

CariAccess Communications was a leading Internet and telecommunications company in Barbados, Saint Lucia and Saint Vincent and the Grenadines. The company offered Internet service, webhosting and domain name registration services. The company was based in the country of Barbados and in all countries, it competed against its main competitor Cable and Wireless. The company was founded by a Saint Vincentian, Anthony Gunn.

== History ==
In 1999 CariAccess Communications, Inc had applied for several licenses to provide services in the southern Caribbean-countries of Barbados, the Commonwealth of Dominica, St. Lucia, St. Vincent, Trinidad. In the United States it also operated under the name Phone Line Co. based-in Atlanta, Georgia. CariAccess has filed several legal challenges in recent years concerning the corporate policies of Cable and Wireless in the region. These challenges were brought under the claim that C&W engages in activities that are discriminatory of competing providers in the newly liberalised telecommunications markets in the Caribbean.

CariAccess previously had an agreement to merge with Barbados-based Sunbeach Communications, Inc. at which time both companies had planned to jointly form a venture with AT&T Wireless. Soon after the deal collapsed for the joint-venture, another partnership with Sunbeach also fell through. In 2007, the company's founder, Gunn died due to health complications. the company continued to operate for some time before winding up its operations.

== See also ==
- List of Barbadian companies
