= List of universities and colleges in Barbados =

This is a list of universities and colleges in Barbados:

== Universities ==
Public universities:

- University of the West Indies, Cave Hill Campus

Private Universities:

- American University of Barbados, School of Medicine

The following institutions are all for-profit medical training schools:

- American University of Integrative Sciences
- Bridgetown International University
- Ross University School of Medicine
- Victoria University of Barbados

== Colleges ==
- Codrington College

== Teacher training colleges ==
- Erdiston Teachers' Training College

== Community College/Institute of Technology ==
- Barbados Community College
- Samuel Jackman Prescod Institute of Technology

== Defunct ==
- Washington University of Barbados

== See also ==
- Education in Barbados
