= Sport in Barbados =

Sports in Barbados are many and varied. Cricket is the most popular sport in Barbados. The large Barbadian diaspora around the globe and wide-scale availability of International television covered on the local Multi-Choice TV has meant that Barbadians have always been up to date on international trends. Barbadians now follow a wide cross-section of sport from around the world. In recent years, the Barbadian government has implemented a policy of sport-based tourism. Including the hosting of the 2007 Cricket World Cup and various other events locally. Beyond this, the Barbadian calendar has many sporting events throughout the year.

== Athletics ==
Obadele Thompson won a bronze medal in the 100m at the 2000 Summer Olympic Games. He's the first and only Bajan to win an Olympic medal. He is also the only Bajan to run sub 10 and sub 20 over 100m and 200m.

Ryan Brathwaite won the gold medal in the 110 metres hurdles at the 2009 World Championships in Athletics in Berlin.

Ramon Gittens won a bronze medal at the 2016 IAAF World Indoor Championships, as well as the 100m silver medal at the 2015 Pan American Games.

Greggmar Swift won a bronze medal at the 2014 Central American and Caribbean Games.

Shane Brathwaite won a gold medal in the octathlon at the 2007 World Youth Championships in Athletics. This is the first Bajan gold medal at a global athletics championship. Brathwaite also won Gold at the 2019 Pan American Games and Bronze at the 2015 Pan American Games.

Akela Jones won a bronze in the women's high jump at the Pan American Games.

Olympian Sada Williams is the National record holder over 200m and 400m. She's a Multiple Carifta Games Champion. She ran a national record 49.83 over the distance at the 2024 Olympic Games.

Andrea Blackett was the 1998 Commonwealth Games Champion over 400m hurdles. She also placed fourth in the Women's 400 metres Hurdles event at the 1999 IAAF World Championships in Seville, Spain.

Olympian Jonathan Jones is the first Bajan to run under 45 seconds over 400m. He holds the national record with a time of 44.64.

Mario Burke won bronze medal in the 100 metres at 2016 World Junior Championships in Athletics. He is only the second Bajan to run sub 10 seconds over the distance.

== Cricket ==
Cricket started in Barbados around 1894, with the Barbados Cricket Association starting in 1933. Many Barbadians follow cricket religiously. Locally, cricket is governed by the Barbados Cricket Association (BCA). Barbados has a national team which takes part in the Regional Four Day Competition and the Regional Super 50, whereas the Barbados Royals is a franchise team in the Caribbean Premier League. Additionally, Barbados has players that are a composite part of the West Indies cricket team. Barbados has a number of famous cricketers including: Sir Garfield Sobers, Sir Everton Weekes, Sir Clyde Walcott, and Sir Frank Worrell. Barbados’ major cricket ground is Kensington Oval.

== Basketball ==
Barbados' basketball team has a history of international accomplishments. It was the only Caribbean team that qualified for the 2006 Commonwealth Games and celebrated several victories. Overall, the team finished 5th, leaving behind South Africa, Scotland and India.

Further, it is one of the few Caribbean teams that qualified for the FIBA Americas Championship.

== Kitesurfing and windsurfing ==
Barbados is a popular destination for kitesurfing and Windsurfing. Wind is blowing most of the year, and its best at December to March. Barbados has great wave for kitesurfers and windsurfers, and there are no flat water spots. Main kite and windsurf beach is Silver Rock at the south tip of the island.

== Motor racing ==
Bushy Park Circuit is in the parish of St. Philip.

Zane Maloney has driven in the FIA Formula 2 Championship for Rodin Motorsport since 2023. He previously drove for Trident Racing in FIA Formula 3, and has served as a reserve driver for the Red Bull Racing Formula One team.

== Sport governing bodies ==
A number of bodies exist throughout Barbados:

- Archery – Barbados Archery Association (BAA)
- Athletics (track and field) – Athletics Association of Barbados (AAB)
- Badminton – Barbados Badminton Association (BBA)
- Basketball – Barbados Amateur Basketball Association (BABA)
- Bodybuilding – Barbados Amateur Body Building and Fitness Federation (BABBF)
- Boxing – Amateur Boxing Association of Barbados (ABAB)
- Cycling – Barbados Cycling Union (BCU)
- Darts – Barbados Darts Association (BDA)
- Equestrian – Barbados Equestrian Association (BEA)
- Football – Barbados Football Association (BFA)
- Golf – Barbados Golf Association (BGA)
- Hockey – Barbados Hockey Federation (BHF)
- Hockey (Ball) – Barbados Ball Hockey League (BBHL)
- Horse Racing – Barbados Turf Club (BTC)
- Polo – Barbados Polo Association (BPA)
- Polo (Segway) – Barbados Segway Polo Association (SPCB)
- Polo (Water) – Barbados Amateur Swimming Association (BASA)
- Racing – Barbados Auto Racing League (BARL) Barbados Rally Club (BRC)
- Road Tennis – Barbados (Professional) Road Tennis Association (BRTA)
- Sailing – Barbados Sailing Association (BSA)
- Squash – Barbados Squash Rackets Association (BSRA)
- Tennis – Barbados Tennis Association (BTA)
- Volleyball – Barbados Volleyball Association (BVA)

== Stadiums in Barbados ==
Stadium	Capacity	City	Image
Kensington Oval	11,000	Bridgetown	
Barbados National Stadium	5,000	St. Michael	

== See also ==
- Barbados at the Commonwealth Games
- Barbados at the Olympics
- Barbados at the Pan American Games
- Barbados at the Paralympics
- Lists of stadiums
