= Barbados Chamber Orchestra =

The Barbados Chamber Orchestra (formerly the Barbados Symphonia) is a chamber orchestra in Barbados. Its current president is Mike Williams, also a leader in the Barbados Boy Scouts Association.
