= Hamble James Leacock =

Barbadian missionary

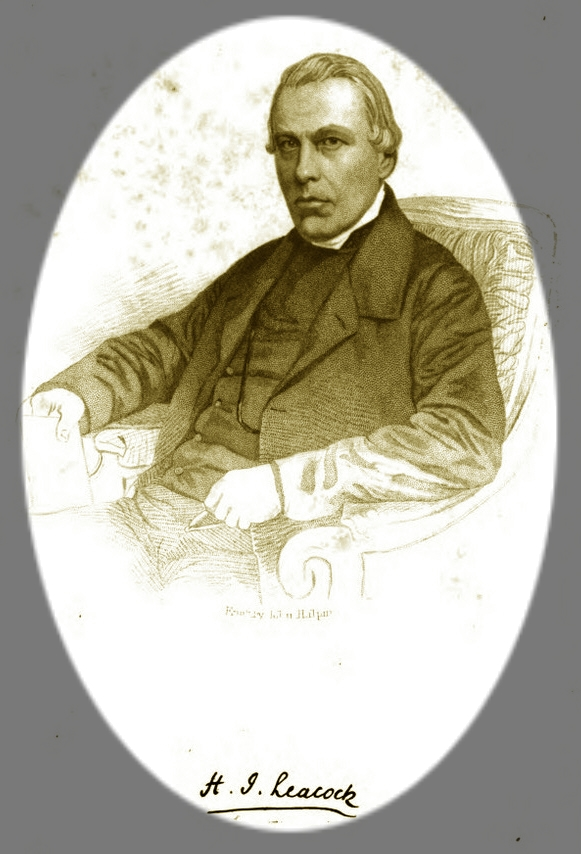
Hamble James Leacock

Hamble James Leacock (4 February 1795 – 20 August 1856) was a Barbadian missionary who worked in Africa in the modern-day countries of The Gambia and Sierra Leone. He was born in Cluff's Bay, Barbados, where his father John Wrong Leacock was a slaveholder. He was educated at Codrington College, St John, Barbados.

== Biography ==
Leacock was born on 4 February 1795 in Cluff's Bay, Barbados. He was the second son of John Wrong Leacock and his wife, Rebecca Hudson. His family had resided in Barbados for around 150 years when Leacock was born, having emigrated during the reign of Charles I. He eventually married, but the details surrounding his spouse are unknown.

He was educated at Codrington College, a theological college located in St. John in the Barbados affiliated with Durham University. He was ordained a deacon in 1827. Leacock gave the privileges of the Church to all slaves of his parish, at the same time freeing his own slaves. However, it has been noted that he received compensation for the slaves. Difficulty with his Bishop, insurrection of slaves, and depreciation in the value of property encouraged him to move to the United States, where he settled in Kentucky, Tennessee, and in New Jersey. In October 1855 together with John Weeks (bishop) he sailed from Plymouth in England for Sierra Leone as a missionary of the West Indian Church Association and founded a mission station in what is now the Anglican Diocese of Gambia at Rio Pongas. He became very ill and eventually returned to Freetown to convalesce, but died there on 20 August 1856.

After his death, Henry Caswell wrote a memoir about Leacock entitled "The Martyr of the Pongas", which was published in 1857 in New York.

== Publications ==
- Henry Caswell, The Martyr of the Pongas, (New York, 1857)
