= Sandwatch =

Sandwatch is a program in which children, youth and adults work together to scientifically monitor and critically evaluate the problems facing their beach environments. They then design and implement practical activities and projects to address particular issues, enhance their beach environment and build resilience to climate change. The Sandwatch approach is called MAST: Monitoring, Analysing, Sharing information, and Taking action. Although Sandwatch has mainly focused on beach environments, the program can be used on other ecosystems, such as rivers and streams.

Sandwatch has received support for activities over the years from organisations such as the United Nations Educational, Scientific and Cultural Organization (UNESCO) and the University of Puerto Rico Sea Grant College Program, among others.

== History ==
In 1999, participants at an Environmental Education workshop in Trinidad and Tobago recognized the potential of using the beach environment as an outdoor classroom. The students at the workshop came up with the name Sandwatch. Since then, the program has grown to include more than 30 member countries with over 300 schools and community groups actively monitoring change in their beach environments.

In 2001, during the first formal Sandwatch training for teachers, the action-based design was trialed and since then Sandwatch and the MAST approach have been successfully used by teachers around the world and are often portrayed as a working example of education for sustainable development.

In 2005 the Sandwatch Manual was published. In October 2010 the manual was revised to include climate change adaptation. The manual: Sandwatch: Adapting to Climate Change and Educating for Sustainable Development is available in four languages (English, French, Portuguese and Spanish), and can be downloaded for free on the Sandwatch website, www.Sandwatch.org.

As the program continued to grow, in 2006 a Sandwatch website and newsletter were launched. In 2008 the Sandwatch Foundation was established as an independent organization to oversee and coordinate the program and is operated by two volunteer directors, Paul Diamond and Gillian Cambers. In 2013 the long-awaited Sandwatch International Database was launched in Mauritius. The database provides participating Sandwatch groups the opportunity to upload their monitoring data to a secure site. Not only does this allow for proper archiving of environmental data, but it also allow users to analyse their results, create their own charts and graphs, and communicate their findings visually with the wider community. Non-Sandwatch groups can also visit the database and view the data.

== Activities ==
Each Sandwatch school or group adopts a local beach and regularly takes a series of measurements and tests of their beach using simple and readily available equipment. By measuring how the beach's width, currents, waves, water quality and other factors change over months and years, the teams can determine whether their beach is stable and healthy or stressed and deteriorating, and the nature of the stressors.

When a group identifies a problem it can, with the community, develop a project to address and mitigate the problem or problems. Project activities include alerting authorities to potential problems such as water contamination (from sewage or agricultural runoff for example), conducting beach clean-ups, replanting mangroves or dune stabilization vegetation, creating signage for proper beach use, monitoring and protecting marine turtle nesting sites, or monitoring the effects of coral bleaching. By keeping the beach and related ecosystems healthy they are made more resilient and better able to adapt to climate change.

All Sandwatch groups are encouraged to regularly post their data, photographs and other project details on the Sandwatch website, as well as to contribute articles and photographs to the twice-yearly newsletter, The Sandwatcher.

Sandwatch representatives are often invited to participate in regional and international workshops and conferences, where they share their experiences and data and forge partnerships with similar environmental groups.

== See also ==
- Sea turtle threats
