= Parkinson Memorial Secondary School =

Secondary school in Barbados

Coordinates: 13.09811°N 59.58050°W

- The Pines, Wildey East West Boulevard, St. Michael; Barbados

Information
- School type: Public secondary
- Motto: Onward Ever Upward.
- Established: 1960
- Principal: Ian Holder
- Enrollment: 870

The Parkinson Memorial Secondary School is a co-educational public secondary school, located at Pine East-West Boulevard, The Pines, Wildey, St.Michael, Barbados. It was opened on 22 February 1961.

== History ==
Parkinson Memorial was established by the Government of Barbados in September 1960 and officially opened in 1961. It is named for educator Augustus Rawle Parkinson.

The school celebrated its 50th anniversary with a month of activities between Saturday, 19 February, and Saturday, 19 March 2011.

Students at the school raised $1000 to provide aid to Dominican students in 2017, following Tropical Storm Erika.

In 2018, Goddard Enterprises Ltd. (GEL) donated $1 million to rebuild the school's Block D, which had been damaged by fire some years earlier. The CEO of GEL said the company "regards educational investment a critical mission for the organisation, and after adopting the school, providing job placements and invaluable work experiences for many students." He said the public-private-partnership was "aimed at improving this generation of youths that we think will be the next leaders and entrepreneurs within Barbados".

At a 2019 leadership conference at the school, students were encouraged to "be innovative, resourceful and to maintain a positive attitude" as part of the school’s positive behaviour management programme.
