= Cave Bay, Barbados =

Body of water on the coast of Barbados

Coordinates: 13°07′N 59°25′W

Cave Bay is located on the southeast coast of Barbados, between Long Bay and Bottom Bay. It is located in Saint Phillip Parish. There is a dangerous undertow in the area, however, there are no lifeguards.
