= List of Barbados hurricanes =

Barbados in the Caribbean

This is a list of hurricanes in Barbados in the Lesser Antilles, Caribbean.

Date : Storm name : Distance from storm eye-wall.

== 1950–58 ==
2 September 1951: Hurricane Dog passes 60 miles to the north.

6 October 1954: Hurricane Hazel passes 45 miles to the south.

22 September 1955: Hurricane Janet passes to the south-east as a Category 2 hurricane.

30 August 1958: Hurricane Ella passes 50 miles to the north.

== 1960–69 ==
10 July 1960: Hurricane Abby passes close to Barbados as a tropical depression.

25 September 1963: Hurricane Edith passes 30 miles to the north as a Category 2 hurricane.

28 August 1965: Hurricane Betsy passes 40 miles to the northeast as a tropical depression.

29 September 1966: Tropical Storm Judith passes 20 miles to the north.

6 September 1967: Hurricane Beulah passes 25 miles to the north as a tropical depression.

== 1970–79 ==
20 August 1970: Tropical Storm Dorothy passes 45 miles to the north as a tropical storm.

13 September 1971: Hurricane Irene-Olivia passes 50 miles to the south as a tropical depression.

19 August 1971: Tropical Storm Chloe passes 40 miles to the north as a tropical depression.

2 October 1974: Hurricane Gertrude passes 55 miles to the south as a tropical storm.

29 August 1979: Hurricane David passes 75 miles to the north-east.

23 June 1979: Tropical Storm Ana passes 60 miles to the north as a tropical storm.

== 1980–88 ==
4 August 1980: Hurricane Allen passes just north of the island.

8 September 1986: Tropical Storm Danielle passes 65 miles to the south.

21 September 1987 Hurricane Emily passes 50 miles to the south.

9 September 1988 Hurricane Gilbert passes 75 miles to the northeast.

== 1990–95 ==
14 August 1993: Tropical Storm Cindy passes 60 miles to the north.

9 September 1994: Tropical Storm Debby passes 20 miles to the north.

14 September 1995: Hurricane Marilyn passes 50 miles to the northeast.

25 August 1995 Hurricane Iris passes 70 miles to the north.

== 2000–07 ==
4 October 2001 Hurricane Iris passes 25 miles to the south.

7 October 2001: Tropical Storm Jerry passes 30 miles to the southwest.

23 September 2002: Hurricane Lili passes 45 miles to the south.

4 August 2004: Tropical Storm Bonnie passes 20 miles to the north.

7 September 2004: Hurricane Ivan passes to the south as a tropical storm.

17 August 2007: Hurricane Dean passes 65 miles to the north.

1 September 2007: Hurricane Felix passes 70 miles to the south.

== 2010–present ==
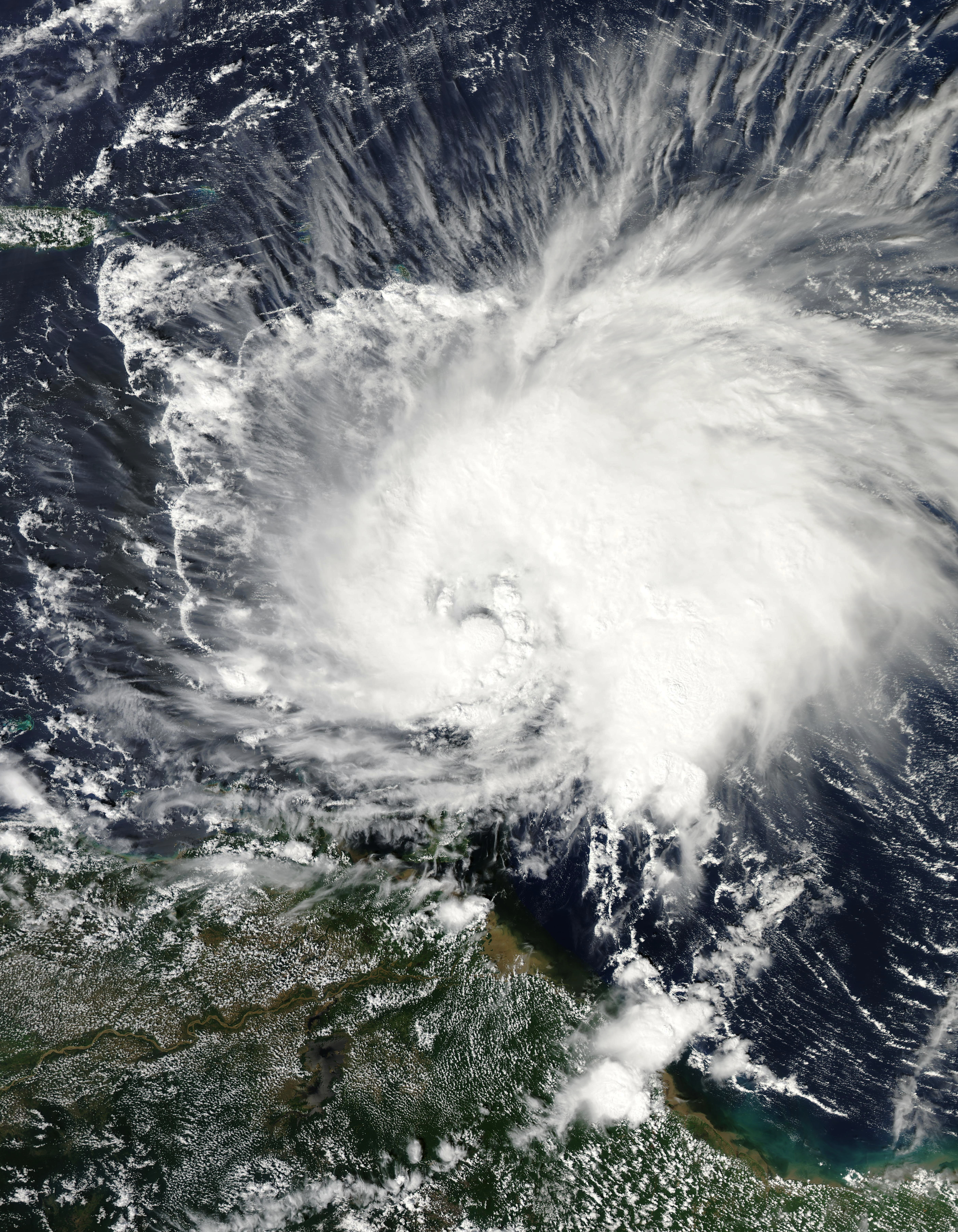
Hurricane Tomas near Barbados on October 30

- 30 October 2010 – Hurricane Tomas skirts the southern coast of Barbados as a strong tropical storm. Upon striking the island and the rest of the Windward archipelago, Tomas becomes the latest hurricane on record in a calendar year to impact the region. At Grantley Adams International Airport, a wind gust of 105 mph (165 km/h) is documented. The same station measured 11.56 in (294 mm) of rain. The strong winds knock down power lines and damage homes; an estimated 1,200 residences sustain damage as a result of Tomas. Overall damage amounts to US$8.5 million, though no deaths are reported.
- 3 August 2012 – Hurricane Ernesto passes 35 mi (56 km) northwest of Barbados, though despite its proximity, brings generally minimal effects to the island.
- 18 August 2017 - Hurricane Harvey made landfall as a storm. Winds left residents throughout Barbados without electricity, with the majority of outages occurring in Christ Church, Saint Joseph, Saint Lucy, and Saint Michael. Flooding washed one house off its foundation, while water entered some houses, forcing some people to evacuate. Bridges in Saint Andrew and Saint Joseph were damaged. Additionally, a fuel depot in Speightstown was flooded. Winds from Harvey ripped the roof off of a church.
- 23 July 2020: Tropical Storm Gonzalo passes 12 miles to the southwest.
- 2 July 2021: Hurricane Elsa passes just south of the island.
- 1 July 2024: Hurricane Beryl passes 40 miles south of the island. 40 small boats sunk in the harbour. 4 homes destroyed. No deaths reported.

== See also ==
- Category:Atlantic hurricane seasons
- List of Cuba hurricanes
- Impact of hurricanes on Caribbean history
