= Lord Radio & the Bimshire Boys =

Lord Radio & the Bimshire Boys were a Barbadian calypso band who helped to pioneer the Barbadian calypso scene in the 1950s and 60s. The name Bimshire comes from a Bajan dialect term for Barbados.

Their albums include Rhymes in Rhythm, The Midget and The Giant and You Asked For It.
