= Barbados–Grenada relations =

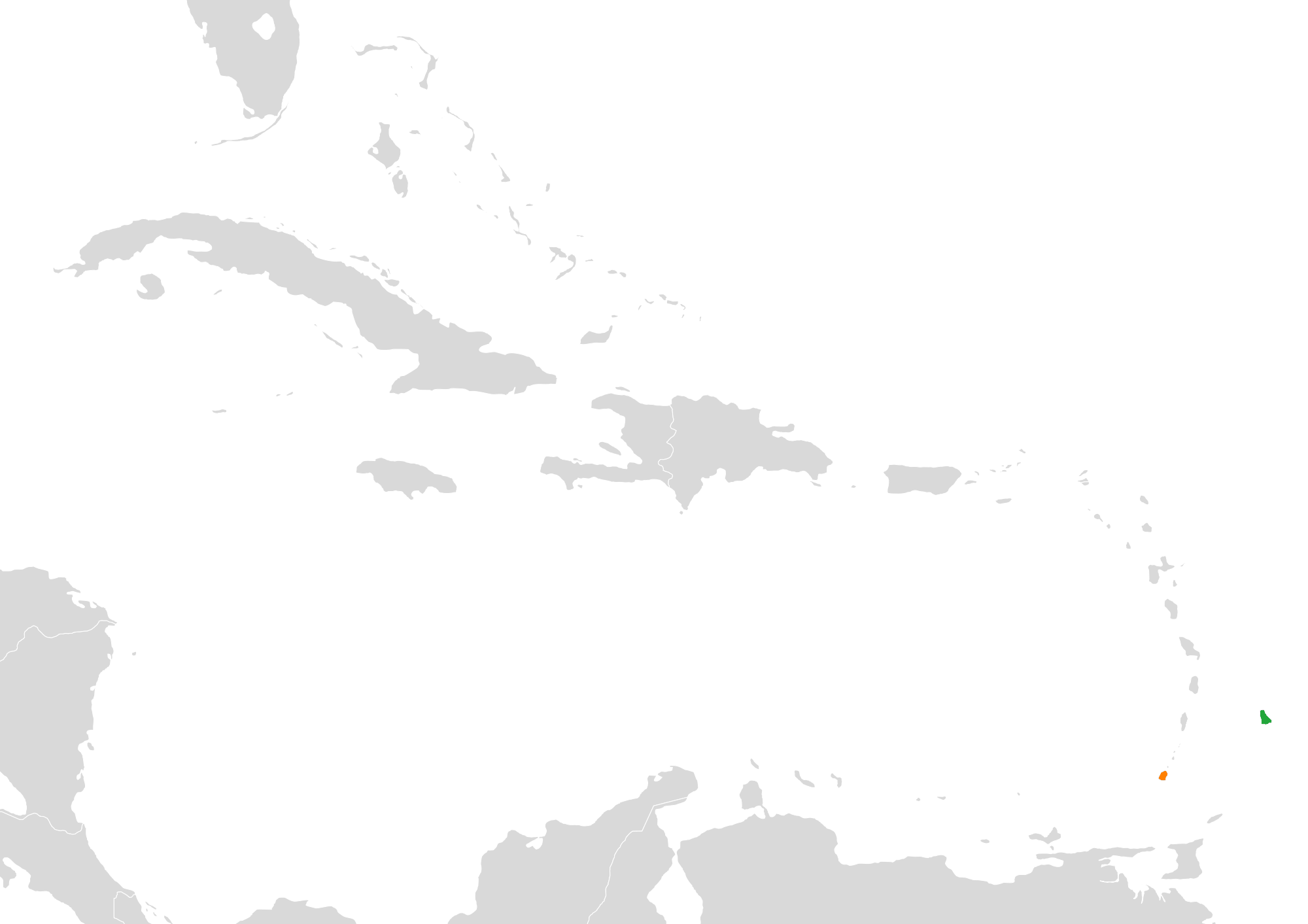

- Barbados: Grenada

Barbados–Grenada relations are foreign relations between Barbados and Grenada. Both countries are full members of the CARICOM and the Commonwealth of Nations. Barbados and Grenada's full diplomatic relations were established on 3 March 1974.

== History ==
Early bilateral interactions occurred as both countries shared their colonial relationship as former parts of the British Empire. Barbados and Grenada joined the British Windward Islands in 1833 until 1885, when Barbados became a single colony and also the main seat of the British Windward Islands was moved from Bridgetown, Barbados to St. George's, Grenada. In 1952, the two British colony's joined the West Indies Federation, at the time Grenada and Barbados became provinces in the Federation. The Federation ended in 1962 and also Barbados once again it returned as a single colony and Grenada was part of the West Indies Associated States.

== Sports ==
Both countries are part of the multi-national West Indies cricket team, with several players from both countries representing the board.

== See also ==
- Foreign relations of Barbados
- Foreign relations of Grenada
