= Bridgetown Market Street Fair =

Festival in Barbados

The Bridgetown Market Street Fair is an annual sub-festival of the Barbados Crop Over Festival held in Bridgetown the capital of Barbados held every year in the last week of July where calypso is performed and cooking contests are held.
