= Classical/Pops Festival =

Annual festival in Barbados

The Classical Pops Festival is an annual outdoor festival held each December at the Apes Hill Club in Barbados. It draws inspiration from events such as Tanglewood in Massachusetts and the BBC Proms in the UK. The festival showcases a unique orchestra composed of principal players and members from various well-known symphonies.

In 2014, the festival orchestra was led by Thomas Wilkins, who serves as the Principal Conductor of the Hollywood Bowl Orchestra and Music Director of the Omaha Symphony. Wilkins also holds the Germeshausen Family and Youth Concert Conductor chair with the Boston Symphony Orchestra (BSO). The orchestra featured four concertmasters performing together with Jonathon Crow, the Concertmaster of the Toronto Symphony Orchestra, holding the official festival concertmaster position.

The festival's orchestra is recognized for its diverse composition, including accomplished African American classical musicians Ann Hobson Pilot, the principal harpist of the Boston Symphony Orchestra; Owen Young, also from the BSO and Terrance Patterson, the Artistic Director of the Ritz Chamber Players.

The festival programming encompasses a range of genres including classical music, contemporary works, jazz, opera, film scores as well as Broadway tunes. These are performed by popular artists accompanied by the orchestra. Guest ensembles also contribute to the festival's lineup. In 2014, the festival opened with Irvin Mayfield & the New Orleans Jazz Orchestra featuring special guest Alison Hinds, followed by the orchestra's performance of ''Film Night'', a showcase of music by John Williams, Hans Zimmer, Henry Mancini, Jerry Goldsmith and Erich Wolfgang Korngold, featuring acclaimed violinist Tai Murray as a soloist. The second day of the festival featured the Piazzolla Trio with dancer Lil Buck, followed by the orchestra's rendition of "Holiday Pops!" with soprano Alison Buchanan, the St. Leonard's Boy's Choir, and the Gospelfest Choir. CNN also covered the festival, including a segment on Lil Buck.
