= Freemasonry in Barbados =

Freemasonry in Barbados is one of the oldest established organisations in the country. Regular Freemasonry is controlled from London and Edinburgh by the United Grand Lodge of England (UGLE) and the Grand Lodge of Scotland through local Provincial Grand Lodges. More recently Prince Hall Freemasonry has also been established on the island.

== History ==
As a fraternal organisation, Freemasonry was introduced to the island in 1740 by Alexander Irvine (c. 1694-1743). The first lodge formed was the St. Michael's Lodge No 94 (or No 186). However, this lodge ceased working in the nineteenth century. Following the closure of this lodge, the Albion Lodge No 196 (UGLE) was formed in 1790, and now remains the longest established lodge in Barbados.

The St. Michael's churchyard which contains a vault where Irvine is entombed has continued to be used by the Barbadian Masonic community.

== Jurisdictions ==
=== United Grand Lodge of England ===
The District Grand Lodge of Barbados and the Eastern Caribbean is the local masonic authority under the United Grand Lodge of England. It is responsible in Barbados for six Craft lodges, and (through its associated Holy Royal Arch authority) three Royal Arch chapters. Albion Lodge No 196 (see above) is the oldest. Prior to 2011, two Lodges met at Bridgetown, and the other four met at Belleville. In 2011 the Masonic Centre in Salters, George was built which is where all of the English and Scottish Lodges in Barbados meet. One of the Lodges, the Research Lodge of Amity No 9073 EC, has a particular focus on Masonic research. The District Grand Lodge also oversees English Freemasonry in eight other Caribbean nations.

=== Grand Lodge of Scotland ===
The District Grand Lodge of Barbados is the local masonic authority under the Scottish Grand Lodge. It is responsible for six Craft lodges, all of which meet in Bridgetown. The former Governor-General of Barbados, Sir Elliott Belgrave is a member and former District Grand Master.

=== Prince Hall Freemasonry ===
The Prince Hall Grand Lodge of the Caribbean is the newest masonic authority on Barbados. In 1960 a Barbadian educator, Mr G. Halley Marville, was introduced to Prince Hall Freemasonry in California, whilst studying in the United States of America. This led eventually to the consecration of the first Prince Hall lodge in Barbados in 1965, under the authority of the Prince Hall Grand Lodge of the State of New York. An autonomous Grand Lodge was formed on 24 April 1993, and now controls lodges throughout the Caribbean, from its headquarters in Barbados. It has twenty lodges across the region, of which five are in Barbados.
