= St. Margaret's Church, Barbados =

Coordinates: 13.183333°N 59.5°W

St. Margaret's Church is a church located in the parish of Saint John, Barbados. It was built in 1862.
