= Washington University of Barbados =

Unaccredited medical school (defunct)

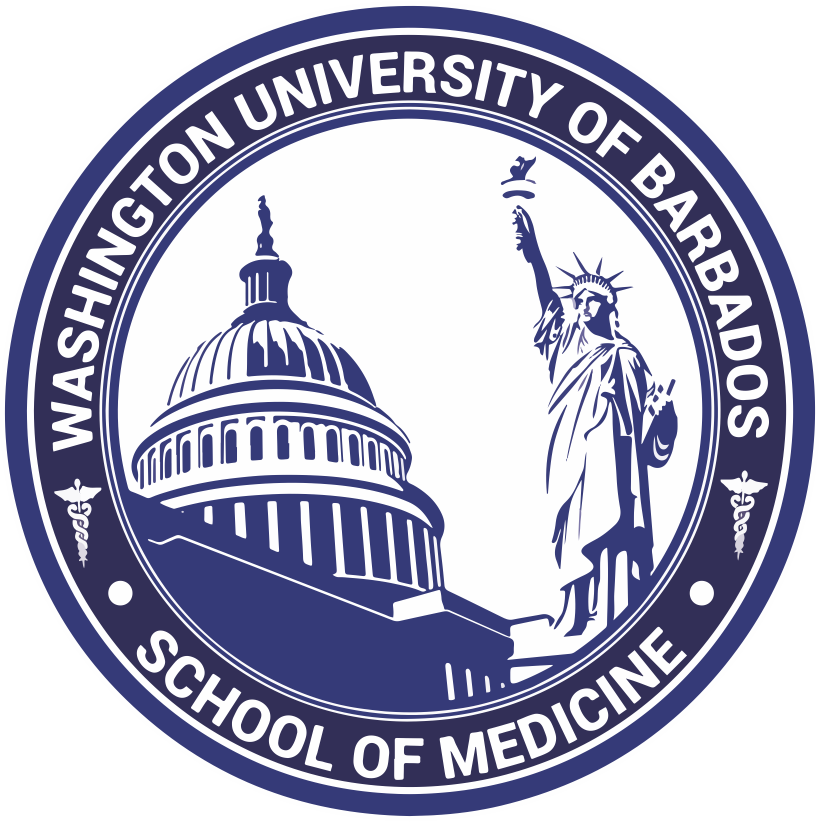
- Motto: We Listen - We Invent - We Deliver
- Type: For-profit medical school
- Active: 2016–2018
- Founders: Gopi Venkata Rao, CEO
- Accreditation: Unaccredited
- Director: Deoraj Dalchand
- Students: 200+
- Location: Casa Grande Hotel, Hibiscus Block, Oldbury, St. Philip, Barbados; 13.09430°N 59.47421°W
- Language: English
- Website: wubmed.org (archived)

The Washington University of Barbados (WUB) is a defunct medical school which opened in 2017 and closed in 2018. The for-profit university received a charter from the Barbados Ministry of Education in 2016, but was unaccredited. Allegedly part of an international scam in which 200 students from India were conned out of ₹25 crore, the CEO and director of the school were arrested by the Royal Barbados Police and charged with fraud in 2018.

== Background ==
In May 2016, The Barbados Advocate reported that WUB was "in the very early stages of making inquiries to be established in Barbados". Senator Harcourt Husbands mentioned the school while debating a bill to establish a Caribbean Accreditation Authority for education in medicine and other health professions. At the time, the American University of Barbados and the Faculty of Medicine at the University of the West Indies at Cave Hill were already operating medical schools in Barbados.

According to its website, WUB was established in 2016, but was also "a renowned healthcare institution that has offered Medical Degrees for over a decade." WUB claimed that it was "devoted to preparing and educating students from across the globe to become professional doctors", and that it was exceptional in "[implementing] the elements for USMLE (United States Medical Licensing Examination) within its curriculum."

In February 2017, the NationNews reported that WUB was "preparing to welcome its first batch of students" after postponing its opening by one year. The article noted that the campus would be based at the Casa Grande Hotel at Oldbury in Saint Philip, and quoted WUB director Deoraj Dalchand as saying that the school was in the process of finalising negotiations with the hotel. Casa Grande had previously been under fire when Nigerian students attending Barbados Community College complained of lack of running water and air conditioning.

== Student, faculty, and staff concerns ==
The first students were admitted to WUB in April 2017. By August 4, 2017, Barbados Today reported that "15 of the 80 foreign students have indicated a desire to leave," citing a letter circulated to the media by a source claiming to represent the student body. The letter explained that the students, who were mainly from India, felt that they had been made "false promises" before embarking on their journey to Barbados. Upon arrival, they found "inadequate classroom furniture and equipment, a lack of air-conditioning, improper ventilation, poor quality food, a lack of study materials and, unlike traditional universities, no proper campus", and felt that they had been "mistreated" and "harassed".

In addition, a video surfaced of WUB Dean Dr. Ram Prasad Upreti addressing students and complaining about the lack of books in the library, the lack of drinking water, and what he characterised as prison-like living conditions for the students. Questioning the very legitimacy of the medical school, he suggested that WUB could lose all its teaching staff because both the faculty and staff had not been paid.

Dalchand told Barbados Today that the students' grievances were being addressed, claiming that the first batch of students had originally been headed for a school in Guyana, but had been redirected at the last minute to Barbados due to delays by the Indian medical board in providing the required documents. Three weeks later, Upreti was referred to in the press as a "former dean" of the school, as CEO Gopi Venkat of WUB accused its rival, the six-year-old American University of Barbados, of a smear campaign against WUB. One year later, on August 15, 2018, the Casa Grande Hotel held a first anniversary celebration for WUB, promoting the school as an example of how "health tourism" could benefit Barbados by bringing foreign exchange into the country. Mrs. Asha Ram Mirchandani, the owner of Case Grande Airport Hotel & Resort, told The Barbados Advocate that WUB intended to bring 500 more students into Barbados.

Meanwhile, WUB remained unaccredited by the Caribbean Accreditation Authority for Education in Medicine and other Health Professions (CAAM-HP), the United States Department of Education's National Committee on Foreign Medical Education Accreditation (NCFMEA), or any other body empowered to certify medical schools in the region.

== Arrests ==
Students and staff at WUB first became aware that CEO Gopi Venkata Rao was wanted in India for fraud on September 30, 2018. On September 29, The Hindu newspaper in India reported that police had raided an educational consultancy firm in Bangalore suspected of having conned over 200 students out of a total of ₹25 crore. The police alleged that the owner of the consultancy, Gopi Venkata Rao, and his staff had targeted students taking the Common Entrance Test, promising them seats at medical schools in various countries including the United States, Canada, Guyana, and China, and charging between ₹30 lakh and ₹40 lakh each. Six people were arrested in India and charged with cheating and forgery, but Venkata Rao, his wife Nikhila, and an associate were said to have escaped. Back in Barbados, a group of students from WUB took their grievances to the Ministry of Education, which began investigation into their living conditions at the school.

Following an international manhunt, Venkata Rao was arrested on campus and taken into custody by the Royal Barbados Police Force on Friday, October 5, 2018. His executive secretary, Tricia Newton, told the media that 40 staff members had not been paid for more than three months, and that both students and staff had no access to food on campus. She also disclosed that the school had refused to renew work permits for Indian staff members, and routinely replaced them when their permits expired.

Soon after the arrest, a group of approximately 200 students gathered for a meeting with Barbados government officials, led by Cynthia Forde, Minister of People Empowerment and Elder Affairs, and representatives of the ministries of labor, health, education, and welfare. Frustrated and confused, the students complained that they had had no access to food, electricity, or water, because the school had neglected to pay their utility bills for five months. While some students said they wanted to return home to India, ministry officials suggested that they might be able to transfer to other medical schools in Barbados.

On October 8, 2018, Gopi Venkata Rao, age 42, was charged with four counts of evading liability, including three dishonoured cheques totalling BDS $210,000 made out to Casa Grande, Inc., and another in the amount of BDS $30,000 owed to Furniture Ltd. T/S Builders Value Mart. Although police initially reported that WUB Director Deoraj Dalchand, age 32, was assisting them with their investigations, by October 16, the reported that Dalchand had been remanded to prison at HMP Dodds, along with Venkata Rao. Both men were scheduled to reappear in court on November 12, 2018. It later emerged that Venkata Rao allegedly owed nearly BDS $3,000,000 for use of the Casa Grande Hotel facility.

== Aftermath ==
=== Indian students and staff ===
On October 14, 2018, Prime Minister Mia Mottley stated in her address to the nation that WUB students would be taken care of and provided with shelter, food, and basic necessities until they were transferred to other schools or returned home to their countries, depending on their individual preferences. As of October 28, 2018, Nation News reported that there were still 35 to 40 students left at the Casa Grande Hotel, including some who were waiting for refunds, despite the lack of electricity or running water. By then, most of the staff and students had left for India, Guyana, Saint Lucia, and Europe. Only a few Indian students remained in Barbados and transferred to American University of Barbados School of Medicine. In February 2019, the new Indian High Commissioner Mahendra Singh Kanyal met with members of the Sindhi Association of Barbados, including two former students from WUB, and assured them that Indian government would not tolerate fraudulent activities by Indian offshore institutions and would do more to protect Indian students from mistreatment in the future.

=== Indian school officials ===
On November 13, 2018, Gopi Venkata Rao and Deoraj Dalchand were granted BDS $200,000 bail, on the condition they surrender their passports. They were scheduled to return to court on January 24, 2019, to answer various fraud-related charges, including dishonestly inducing Casa Grande to wait for payout of BDS $2,863,080.

=== Barbados politics, education, and business ===
In her address to the nation, Prime Minister Mottley said the WUB incident was one of many "things" the Barbados Labour Party (BLP) had been confronted with since being elected into office on May 25, 2018.

An article in Barbados Today pointed out that WUB had been "one of the earliest and brightest jewels" of the Freundel Stuart administration's efforts to establish Barbados as a "hub for medical education", before the Democratic Labour Party was defeated in the 2018 elections. A former consultant to WUB claimed that before leaving India, all WUB staff had been shown a video featuring the previous Barbados prime minister, Freundel Stuart, and Minister of Health John Boyce, guaranteeing that WUB met all the necessary health requirements. According to consultant Subash Agarwal, one month after the Barbados general elections, the former Minister of Education Ronald Jones had visited campus and promised staff and students that accreditation by the Barbados Accreditation Council was imminent.

University of West Indies Vice Chancellor Sir Hilary Beckles expressed his sympathy for the students, and described the WUB scandal as an embarrassment to higher education. Calling for stricter checks and balances for all educational institutions and rigorous vetting of foreign teaching staff in the Caribbean, Beckles distanced public universities such as UWI from for-profit universities such as WUB. Similarly, Barbados International Business Association (BIBA) President Julia Hope told Loop News that the scandal underscored the importance of conducting careful due diligence before doing business with new entrants to Barbados.

In January 2019, when the Ross University School of Medicine relocated from Dominica to Barbados, Education Minister Santia Bradshaw reassured Barbadian citizens that unlike WUB, it was a legitimate, accredited institution, and that the BLP-led government had done its due diligence on the school.

== See also ==
- List of unaccredited institutions of higher education
- List of medical schools in the Caribbean
