= Call signs in Barbados =

Call signs in Barbados include a three letter country code, and a series of letters and numbers.

The International Telecommunication Union has assigned Barbados the following call sign blocks for all radio communication, broadcasting or transmission:

Call sign block	
8PA - 8PZ	Barbados

== Call sign assignments for amateur radio ==
Amateur radio call signs are unique identifiers for the 315 licensed operators in Barbados. The call signs are regulated internationally by the ITU as well as nationally by the Telecommunications Unit in the Ministry of Energy and Public Utilities.

The Telecommunications Unit issues call signs in the 8P series for amateur use. Barbadian nationals are identified by the prefix “8P6”, non-nationals are identified by the prefix “8P9”.

Call signs are assigned on a sequential basis and normally amateurs are not allowed to select one even if available. However, the form in which Barbadians apply for call signs allow for a choice of two-letters from AA to ZZ, to form an 8P6xx, 2x2 call sign.

While not directly related to call signs, the International Telecommunication Union (ITU) further has divided all countries assigned amateur radio prefixes into three regions; Barbados is located in ITU Region 2, ITU Zone 11 and CQ Zone 08.

=== Special regulations regarding station identification ===
The Telecommunications Regulations indicate that call sign must be sent, and if in morse code not more than 20 words per minute speed.

=== Special call signs ===
Barbadian policy allows for 1x1 call signs for special events, although this probably refers to what is (in effect) a 2x1 call sign of 8P6x, where 'x' is a single letter. The 8P5 prefix is also used, as is the 8P2 prefix.

The Amateur Radio Society of Barbados is assigned 8P55AW as 2010 is the 55th Anniversary of the Society.

Country code	Call sign	Location
BRB	VOB	Barbados
BRB	8P	Barbados
