= International rankings of Barbados =

The following are international rankings of Barbados.

== Economic ==
- The Wall Street Journal and The Heritage Foundation: Index of Economic Freedom 2006, ranked out of 157 countries
  - 2005 ranked 32nd of 155 countries
- International Monetary Fund: GDP (nominal) per capita 2006, ranked out of 182 countries
- International Monetary Fund: GDP (nominal) 2006, ranked out of 181 countries
- Minimum wages Index
- World Economic Forum: Global Competitiveness Index 2006–2007, ranked 31st out of 125 countries
- World Economic Forum, The Global Information Technology Report 2006-2007's "Networked Readiness Index":
  - 2006-2007: ranked 40th out of 122 countries
- World Bank:
  - Total GDP per capita
    - 2003 (World Bank): ranked 38 -- $15,712
  - Total GDP (nominal)
    - 2003: ranked 138 -- $2,628
- - GDP - (PPP) per capita:
  - 2004: ranked 59 of 232 countries & territories -- $15,700 59th

== General ==
- United Nations: Human Development Index 2006, ranked 31st out of 177 countries
  - 2005, ranked 30th out of 177 countries
  - 2004, ranked 29th out of 177 countries
  - 2003, ranked 27th out of 175 countries
  - 2002, ranked 31st out of 173 countries
  - 2001, ranked 31st out of 162 countries
  - 2000, ranked 30th out of 174 countries
  - 1999, ranked 29th out of 174 countries
  - 1998, N/A
- Literacy rate, countries by literacy rate - by UNDP
  - 2005: ranked 23rd of 177 countries—99.7%
- A.T. Kearney/Foreign Policy Magazine: Globalization Index 2007, ranked 98th out of 62 countries

== Human rights ==
- Freedom in the World – Political Liberties
  - 2010, ranked 1st (Joint) out of 193
- Freedom in the World – Civil Rights
  - 2010, ranked 1st (Joint) out of 193

== Politics ==
- The Economist: Democracy Index 2009, N/A
- Property Rights Alliance: International Property Rights Index 2008, N/A
- Transparency International: Corruption Perceptions Index 2007, ranked 40 out of 163 countries
  - 2007-2008, ranked 50th out of 133 countries
  - 2006-2007, ranked 40th out of 146 countries
  - 2005-2006, ranked 31st out of 125
  - 2004-2005, ranked 21st out of 146 countries
- Reporters Without Borders: Worldwide press freedom index 2007, ranked out of 168 countries
  - 2008, N/A

== Social ==
- Economist Intelligence Unit: Quality-of-life index 2005, ranked 33rd out of 108 countries
- Fund For Peace: Failed States Index) 2009, ranked 135 out of 177
- Happy Planet Index: 2006, ranked 43rd out of 178 countries
- Institute for Economics and Peace Global Peace Index 2009, N/A
- Save the Children: State of the World's Mothers report
  - 2008:2008 N/A
  - 2004: N/A

== Technological ==
- Economist Intelligence Unit e-readiness rankings 2007, ranked 9 out of 69 countries
- International Telecommunication Union, Digital Access Index (Top 10 in Americas):
  - 2002: ranked 45 of 178 countries 45th
- World Intellectual Property Organization: Global Innovation Index 2026, ranked 91 out of 139 countries

== See also ==
- List of indices of freedom
- List of island countries by population density (Currently ranked 7th most densely populated in the world)
- Lists of countries
- Lists by country
