= IPSC Barbados =

Barbadian practical shooting organization

- Formation: 1993
- Headquarters: Saint George, Barbados
- Chairman/ President: Leonardo Kunar
- Parent organization: International Practical Shooting Confederation
- Website: ipscworld.org/bar

IPSC Barbados is the Barbadian association for practical shooting under the International Practical Shooting Confederation.
