= Metrication in Barbados =

The process of metrication in Barbados started in the early 1970s with an initiative by the government to push for industrialisation of the economy. The process has progressed slowly but the metric system has now replaced the previous imperial units.

Although the metric system is the official system of weights and measures of the country, both metric and US customary units (similar to or identical with imperial units in many instances) must be used on commodity labels which are exported to the American market. The real estate industry may also tend to cater to most categories of home buyers and likewise may use both metric and imperial standards of measure. Beyond this distances are usually measured in metres or kilometres; mass in milligrams, grams or kilograms; and temperature in degrees Celsius.

== History ==
The establishment of a Barbados Industrial Development Corporation, stimulated the advent of a local Barbados National Standards Institute (BNSI) in 1972. The BNSI was a joint collaboration of the Government of Barbados along Mr. Davis and Mr. Gordon Watson from UNIDO. As part of the BNSI's approach, it sought to implement standards to replace the former Imperial Standards for Weights and Measures in Barbados.

Weights and Measures in Barbados were defined through the act of Parliament of the same name that dated back to 1891. It was by-and-large made up of former British Imperial units of measurement, save for local peculiarities. For example: The standard of liquid gallons in Barbados was measured at exactly 231 cu. ins. (a measure used in the United States of America), whereas the British unit of the same was about 277.419 cu.ins. Due to this and other complexities of the market, the government enacted in 1977 an Act of Parliament to switch Barbados to the International Standards of Units (SI). At that point of time, Barbados was one country out of thirteen across the globe which had not yet implemented a process for metrication and it was thought that Barbados needed to move in the direction of the global standards. The plan for the metrication of Barbados called for completion of the processes by 1979. The process was undertaken with the help of a Metrication Board established within BNSI.

=== BNSI ===
The BNSI similarly was further spurred by the creation of the Caribbean Free Trade Association CARIFTA, and trade within this block and external markets created a realisation of benefits to be derived from a transition to metric.
