= Miss Barbados =

Miss Barbados may refer to:

- Miss Universe Barbados
- Miss Barbados World
