= Woodbourne, Barbados =

Village in Barbados

Coordinates: 13°05′N 59°29′W

Woodbourne is a village in both the Parish of Saint Philip and Christ Church in Barbados. It is the area where most of the crude oil is being currently produced in Barbados, by the Barbados National Oil Company (BNOC). BNOC was established in 1983, when the Barbados Government bought out the interest of Mobil Oil.
