= Barbados Red Cross Society =

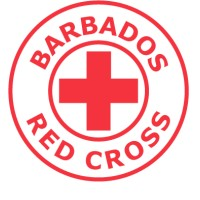
- Founded: 1966
- Type: Non-profit organisation
- Purpose: Humanitarian Aid
- Location: Barbados
- Affiliations: International Committee of the Red Cross; International Federation of Red Cross and Red Crescent Societies

The Barbados Red Cross Society was founded in 1960 as part of the British Red Cross. The Parliament of Barbados passed the Barbados Red Cross Society Act in 1966, the same year that Barbados became a country independent of the United Kingdom.

== See also ==
Barbados Independence Act 1966
