= Crane Bay, Barbados =

Coordinates: 13.1046°N 59.4442°W

Crane Bay is located on the southeast coast of Barbados, between Foul Bay and Long Bay, in Saint Philip Parish.

The name "Crane" was derived from the large crane situated at the top of the cliff which was used for loading and unloading ships.
