= Long Bay, Barbados =

Bay located in the Barbados

Coordinates: 13°04′N 59°29′W

Long Bay is located on the southeast coast of Barbados, between Crane Bay and Cave Bay.
