= Bayleys, Barbados =

Village in Barbados

Coordinates: 13°09′N 59°27′W

Bayleys is a village in Saint Philip Parish in Barbados.

There are many vacation rentals in the village.

Bayleys is named for the Bayley’s plantation, site of a famous slave revolt in 1816.

The community is served by St. Catherine’s School. Nearby is the St Catherine (sic.) Sports and Social Club, which hosts cricket matches and other public sports events.
