= Barbados Association for Children with Intellectual Challenges =

Disability organization based in Barbados

Barbados Association for Children With Intellectual Challenges
- Formation: 1964
- Legal status: charity
- Headquarters: Saint Thomas, Barbados

The Barbados Association for Children With Intellectual Challenges, formerly the Barbados Association for Mentally Retarded Children, is a charitable organization in Barbados for children and adults with intellectual disability. It was founded in 1964. The Association was incorporated by an Act of the Barbados Parliament, Barbados Association for Mentally Retarded Children Act, 1969–15, which was subsequently amended to change the association's name. It is a member of the Barbados Council for the Disabled. The body is financed partly by the government. The association operates the Challenor Creative Arts & Training Centre.

== Leadership ==
Cecil de Caires was president of the association from 1969 to 1973. Dr. Jennifer Campbell now serves as the chairman on the board of management and Sonia Pile is the current Principal.

== Challenor Creative Arts & Training Centre ==
The centre is located at Cane Field, Saint Thomas, Barbados. It has two divisions, the children's school and the adult trainee section. While the school section closes during the vacation period, the trainee section remains open for an extended period. In 2006 it was on the verge of closure due to financial problems but in the end funds were received, renovations were made and it was reopened as a state-of-the-art facility. The Barbados Children's Trust have assisted by providing Challenor Creative Arts & Training Centre with specialised educational material and equipment and other resources.

There are workshops organised into six sections:

1. Food Preparation
2. Woodworking
3. Sewing and Craft
4. Computer
5. Music
6. Agriculture
