= Jesus Army Productions =

Background information
- Origin: Barbados, West Indies
- Years active: 31 October 2003 to present

Jesus Army Productions is a performing arts company based in the Caribbean island of Barbados. Jesus Army Productions came out of the Universities and Colleges Christian Fellowship (UCCF) at the University of the West Indies, Cave Hill Campus, Barbados. Their mission is to spread the gospel of Jesus Christ in way that is comical and entertaining but that also makes one think. Over the years, "Jesus Army Productions has developed a reputation for bringing wit and humour to serious pieces, while preaching God's word." "To the uninitiated, Jesus Army Productions pushes the envelope in getting its message across. The producers do not hold back on using everyday vices such as sex, lust and vanity to convey their message of salvation to the audience."

== Early years ==
In the year 2000 a young man named Rommel Hall became the Drama Coordinator of UCCF. At the time he didn't know much about the performing arts except that "drama was the ability to tell a story on stage." So with ideas in his head and Jesus by his side, Hall launched out into the dramatic realm.

With Hall at the helm, the UCCF Drama Group put on several full-length productions: "Stop, Think, Choose" – September 2001, "Living in the Real World" 8 March 2002 "Our Choice TV" September 2002 and "Tales From the Script" March 2003.

UCCF Drama also won a bronze award at the 2002 National Independence Festival of Creative Arts NIFCA, held in Barbados every November.

It was from UCCF Drama that Jesus Army Productions was birthed.

== Genesis ==
In 2004 Jesus Army Productions released an EP entitled "The Genesis". From it came the hit song "Crisis" which peaked at No. 2 for three weeks on the musical charts of Barbados' Christian radio station.

=== Track listing ===
All songs written by Rommel Hall

1. "Genesis (Intro)" – 1:46
2. "S.O.E.4.1.3 (Song Of Empowerment from Ephesians 4:13)" – 3:33
3. "De War Song (Down, down, down)" – 4:46
4. "Crisis" – 5:27
5. "Your Holy Name (Interlude)" – 0:35
6. "Song of Praise" – 4:07
7. "Genesis (Outro)" – 1:39

==== Album personnel ====
- Rommel Hall – lead vocal on tracks 2, 3 and 4, producer.
- Annette Smithen-Ward – lead vocal on tracks 6 and 7.
- Keren Hall – lead vocal on tracks 1, 5.
- Tejay – adlibs on track 1 and 6.
- Adrian Burgess, Omar Simpson & Danny Ward – backing vocals on track 2.
- Nahila Bynoe, Christal Reid, Corey Reid – intro for track 3.
- David Thomas – backing vocals on track 5, guitar on track 1.
- Ryan Bayne – guitar on track 7.
- Dana Ward – engineer & mixing
- Charles D. Lewis – mastering
- Studio Studio – photos
- Lydia Browne – cover design, graphics

== Our Choice TV: Unloaded ==
In July 2004, in conjunction with Christfestival, a now defunct event once held at UWI annually, Jesus Army Productions staged their first major dramatic production- "Our Choice TV: Unloaded." The production involved a series of short skits showing how the television can have adverse effects on a person's life. From within this production came the critically acclaimed "Jesus is the One" which drew a parallel between Jesus Christ and Neo of the movie The Matrix and "The Must-Have Trade Expo." The latter went on to win "Most Promising Dramatic Piece" at NIFCA 2004.

== Bad Friday ==
On 16 September 2006, Jesus Army Productions staged their second major dramatic production entitled "Bad Friday" at the Queen's College (Barbados) School Hall. The production focussed on the Woodley family and their reaction to an impending disaster which would ensure the extinction of the human race. "Bad Friday" went on to win "Concert/Event of the Year" at the 2007 Flame Gospel Awards, held in Barbados annually.

== Trapped in an Elevator ==
Trapped in an Elevator is the critically acclaimed stageplay performed at the 2007 National Independence Festival of Creative Arts. "It told of the pitfalls in the lives of six people – a mother and her indisciplined daughter who was abandoned by her father; two best friends who were impregnated by the same man who turned out to be a runaway father; a man who wanted to kill himself because his marriage was called off; and the narrator who has [a] little trouble with his wife." The piece, performed at the NIFCA Performing Arts Gala on Sunday 18 November 2007 received a Silver Award, The Wendell Smith Trophy for Best Directed Play and Most Promising Performance by a Community Group.

== The Jesus Army Show: Five Years of Jesus Armyness ==
On 22 and 23 November 2008, Jesus Army Productions hosted their fifth 5th anniversary show. The show entitled The Jesus Army Show: Five Years of Jesus Armyness comprised several of their best skits from over the last five years as well as excerpts from their D.V.D. releases Trapped in An Elevator and In One Accord which were officially launched at the show.

== SKITography ==
Full-Length productions in bold

- As UCCF Drama
  - 2001 – **"Stop, Think, Choose,"** "The Strange Tale of Seymore and Patsy."
  - 2002 – **"Living in the Real World,"** "Tribute to the Dearly Departing," **"Our Choice TV"** ("Superfellow & Littleman" | "Spirit Aid" | "Days of the Bold & the Restless" | "Be Gone" | "Abstainoplex" | "Mission Improbable" | "B Johnson With Style" | "Trinity Life Assurance"), "Jesus Army" (rhythm poetry).
  - 2003 – "The Case of the Missing Love," **"Tales From the Script."**
- Jesus Army Productions
  - 2004 – **"Our Choice TV: Unloaded"** ("The Wrath of Quai Chang Shane" | "Good Bye Sin (GBS) Footwear" | "The Poppets" | "Horizon Wireless" | "Lord of the Rings...of Lies" | "The Must-Have Trade Expo" | "What If God Was Like This?" | "Jesus is the One").
  - 2005 – "God: A Bajan?" "Trinity Life Assurance," "Victor/Rhea's Secret."
  - 2006 – "Rocky," "In One Accord," **"Bad Friday."**
  - 2007 – "In the Nick of Time," "The Usual Suspects," "I Know What You Did Last Semester," "The Main Event," "Brian, Laura and Their Cricket," "Trapped in an Elevator."
  - 2008 – "Pottiphére's Wife," "The Try Jesus Series," "Trinity Life Assurance (remix)," **The Jesus Army Show: Five Years of Jesus Armyness**.

== DVD releases ==
In 2008 Jesus Army Productions released two DVDs. These DVDS contained some of their skits which were converted into short films and a set of new films entitled the Try-Jesus Series which took the form of commercials advertising Jesus. Each DVD also has an audio commentary for their title films as well as bloopers and an extensive Behind-the-Scenes documentary.

=== In One Accord ===
  - In One Accord
  - Jesus: the Sure Thing
  - Horizon Wireless
  - Days of the Bold and the Restless
  - Jesus: the Problem Solver
  - Jesus: the Life Changer

=== Trapped in an Elevator ===
  - Trapped in an Elevator
  - Jesus: the Sure Thing
  - Horizon Wireless
  - God...a Bajan?
  - Jesus: the Problem Solver
  - Jesus: the Life Changer

== Awards and nominations ==
- National Independence Festival of Creative Arts (NIFCA)
  - 2002, Bronze Award: "Jesus Army" (Rhythm Poetry as UCCF Drama)
  - 2004, Bronze Award: "The Must-Have Trade Expo" (Skit)
  - 2004, Most Promising Theatre Piece: "The Must-Have Trade Expo"
  - 2005, Bronze Award: "Trinity Life Assurance"
  - 2007, Silver Award: "Trapped in an Elevator"
  - 2007, The Wendell Smith Trophy for Best Directed Play: "Trapped in an Elevator"
  - 2007, Most Promising Performance by a Community Group: "Trapped in an Elevator"
- FLAME Gospel Awards
  - 2005, Best New Group (nominated)
  - 2005, Album of the Year: "The Genesis" (nominated)
  - 2005, Creative Act of the Year (Won)
  - 2006, Creative Act of the Year (nominated)
  - 2007, Creative Act of the Year (nominated)
  - 2007, Concert/Event of the Year: "Bad Friday" (Won)
  - 2008, Creative Act of the Year (Won)
  - 2009, Concert/Event of the Year: "The Jesus Army Show" (nominated)
  - 2009, Creative Act of the Year (Won)
