= Barbados Port Incorporated =

Government agency of Barbados

The Barbados Port Incorporated (BPI) is an agency of the government of Barbados which principally regulates shipping into the island, and controls immigration into Barbados in the capital of Bridgetown. Established in 1979 as the Barbados Port Authority (BPA), it was then set up as a statutory body to plan, build, develop and maintain the port to a high standard. As part of the government's reform policy the port authority was renamed Barbados Port Inc. in 2003.
