= CarIFS =

Barbadian financial company

- Operating area: Caribbean
- ATMs: 104 ATMs and 3,500 point of sale terminals
- Founded: 1994
- Defunct: 2020

Caribbean Integrated Financial Services Inc. (CarIFS) was a Barbados-based interbank network or ABM-network provider. The company used the brand name CarIFS and offered customers of various financial institutions in Barbados 24-hour access to cash from their bank accounts via any affiliated Automated Banking Machine (ABM). The network was shut down in 2020 and card transactions moved to the international VISA and Mastercard network.

As of 2007 the Manager of CarIFS was David Robinson.

There was some criticism of the banks to end CarIFS as fees for customers and merchants increased with the move to the international networks.

== Statistics ==
As of 2006 the network linked over 104 automated banking machines and 35 hundred point of sale terminals throughout Barbados and recorded a total of 3.5 million transactions.

== Banks with ABMs on CarIFS ==
- Barbados National Bank (BNB)
- Barbados Public Workers Co-Op Credit Union Ltd (BPWCCUL)
- City of Bridgetown Co-op Credit Union Ltd. (COB)
- FirstCaribbean International Bank (FCIB)
- Royal Bank of Canada (RBC)
- Scotiabank
