= Mass media in Barbados =

The mass media in Barbados have had a long history of being entitled to an open policy by the Government, and by the citizenry with respect to press Freedoms. Barbados has a collection of local and foreign owned media entities providing the country with varying views via newspaper, magazine, television, or radio communications.

In terms of broadcast media, the Barbados Government largely has a hands off policy, as long as the content being aired by a media outlet is not profane, libelous, lewd, slanderous or vile. Depending on the severity, situations like a swearing offense could treated by an initial warning, and might proceed to monetary fines only if further instances continue.

== See also ==
- Communications in Barbados
- List of newspapers in Barbados
- List of radio stations in Barbados
- Multi-Choice TV (Barbados) – Cable channel provider
