= Barbados Water Authority =

Barbados Water Authority Limited (BWA), a government statutory corporation, is the sole provider of water services. Water supplied by the BWA in Barbados is pumped from wells within natural coral aquifers. The geology of Barbados is mostly composed of karst limestone which acts as a filter medium within the aquifers. The water service in Barbados is reliable and the water supply is safe and refreshing to drink; although the water source naturally of high quality, the BWA treats the potable water supply with chlorine to comply with World Health Organization (WHO) standards.

== Desalination plant ==
Due to high demand, a desalination plant was built to augment the existing groundwater. Currently supplying for up to 20 per cent of the population, the joint General Electric and Williams Industries-owned facility at Brighton, St. Michael; it currently produces about 23,000 cubic metres of potable water per day, (with maximum capacity for 30,000 cubic metres.) The plant takes brackish water from ten 80-foot wells located near its St. Michael operation and the water is pretreated and then desalted to produce potable water.

== Distribution network ==
Typically, water is conveyed by pumps at the individual sources to elevated reservoirs for storage before distribution to consumers by gravity. The headquarters of the BWA are at The Pine in St Michael.

Prior to the introduction of indoor plumbing to all of the houses on the island, it was a common practice for most areas in Barbados to have a communal-based standpipe. Neighbourhood standpipes have since been turned off at many points across the island due to several instances where persons were found using the standpipe to conduct things like washing their cars in order to avoid paying for the high water usage at their residence.
