= The Girl Guides Association of Barbados =

- Country: Barbados
- Founded: 30 November 1918
- Membership: 2738
- Chief Commissioner: Nadia Skeete
- Affiliation: World Association of Girl Guides and Girl Scouts
- Website https://www.facebook.com/girlguidesbarbados/
- Brownie

The Girl Guides Association of Barbados (GGAB) is the national Guiding organization on the island nation of Barbados. It serves 2738 members (as of 2017). Founded in 1918, the girls-only organization became a full member of the World Association of Girl Guides and Girl Scouts (WAGGGS) in 1972.

== History ==
Guiding began in Barbados in 1918, when Charles O'Brien became the Governor of Barbados. He had two daughters who came with him to Barbados, and they had become Guides shortly before leaving the United Kingdom. His wife became the first leader until her departure in 1925, and a room in Government House was used as the headquarters. Land for permanent headquarters was obtained in 1949, and the headquarters were opened in 1964.

The Association became an association member of the World Association of Girl Guides and Girl Scouts in 1969 and a full member in 1972. Membership was reported to be 3112 in 1998. In 2017, membership was 2738 members. Several Barbadian politicians, such as Adrian Forde, Charles McDonald Griffith, and Wilfred Abrahams have encouraged an increase in the scouting movement in Barbados; children often leave both the Boy Scouts and the Girl Guides in adolescence when preparing for their Common Entrance Examination.

== Activities ==
The association has an eight-point program emphasizing fitness, the mind, enjoyment of the outdoors, crafting, service to others, relations with others, creativity, and character. Girls with disabilities are integrated into mainstream units when possible; in 1997, the program also had two units at schools for children with disabilities. Camping, community service, and international communication with other Caribbean islands are also important activities. In 2020, the Association began to encourage more cooperative events with the Barbados Boy Scouts Association, such as a World Thinking Day rally in Bridgetown. In 2025, a Caribbean Community badge was created.

== Program ==
The Association is divided into two sections with 5 sub-sections according to age:

- Junior section
  - Blossom Guides – ages 5 to 7
  - Brownie Guides – ages 7 to 11
- Senior section
  - Girl Guides – ages 10 to 16
  - Ranger Guides – ages 14 to 25
  - Young Leaders – ages 15 to 23

== Organisation ==
The organization is divided into four divisions, each with four districts. The council is the general management committee, headed by a president, vice-president, and three life vice-presidents, while the executive committee is headed by the chief commissioner and is responsible for the overall management of the organisation.

== See also ==
- Barbados Boy Scouts Association
