= Caribbean360 =

Caribbean360 was a large online news aggregator for the Caribbean. It launched in 2005 and ran through May 2020. It was based in Bridgetown, Barbados. Specializing in news sources from the nations of the Caribbean Community, it competed with websites like One Caribbean Media and the Caribbean Net News. As of 2009, it drew from 35 print and electronic publishers in 28 countries. Its content was free to access.

Iain Dale called Caribbean360 "the most comprehensive pan-Caribbean blog", while the Keele Guide listed it as one of only five "Media and News" sources for the "Caribbean and Central America Generally".

== Syndicated sources ==
- Antigua: Antigua Sun
- Aruba: Bon Dia
- Bahamas: The Nassau Guardian
- Barbados: The Barbados Advocate, Broad Street Journal, The Nation
- Bermuda: Bermuda Sun
- Bequia: Bequia Herald
- British: Virgin Islands Island Sun, Daily News
- Cayman: Cayman Net News, Cay Compass
- Cuba: Granma (Spanish)
- Curaçao: Amigoe (Dutch)
- Dominica: Independent, New Chronicle, News Dominica, The Times
- Dominican Republic: Hoy (Spanish)
- Guadeloupe: Le Journale de Barthe (French)
- Guyana: Guyana Chronicle, Stabroek News, Le Journal de Saint Barth (French)
- Grenada: Grenada Today
- Haiti: Agence Haitienne de Presse (French), Agence Haitienne de Presse (English), AlterPresse (Frency), Haiti Press Network, Haiti Progres (French)
- Jamaica: Jamaica Gleaner, Jamaica Observer, Stabroek News
- Margarita: La Hora-Isla, Jamaica Observer
- Montserrat: Montserrat Reporter
- Puerto Rico: El Nuevo Dia, Puerto Rico WOW
- Santo Domingo: Listin Diario (Spanish)
- St. Kitts & Nevis: The Democrat
- St. Lucia: The Star The Mirror
- St. Vincent & the Grenadines: Searchlight, SVG Express, The Vincentian
- Suriname: Dagblad Suriname (Dutch), De Ware Tijd (Dutch), De West (Dutch), Times of Suriname
- Trinidad: Trinidad Express, Trinidad Guardian, Newsday, Virgin Islands Daily News
- US Virgin Islands: Daily News
- Venezuela: Caracas News
