= The Barbados Advocate =

Barbadian daily newspaper

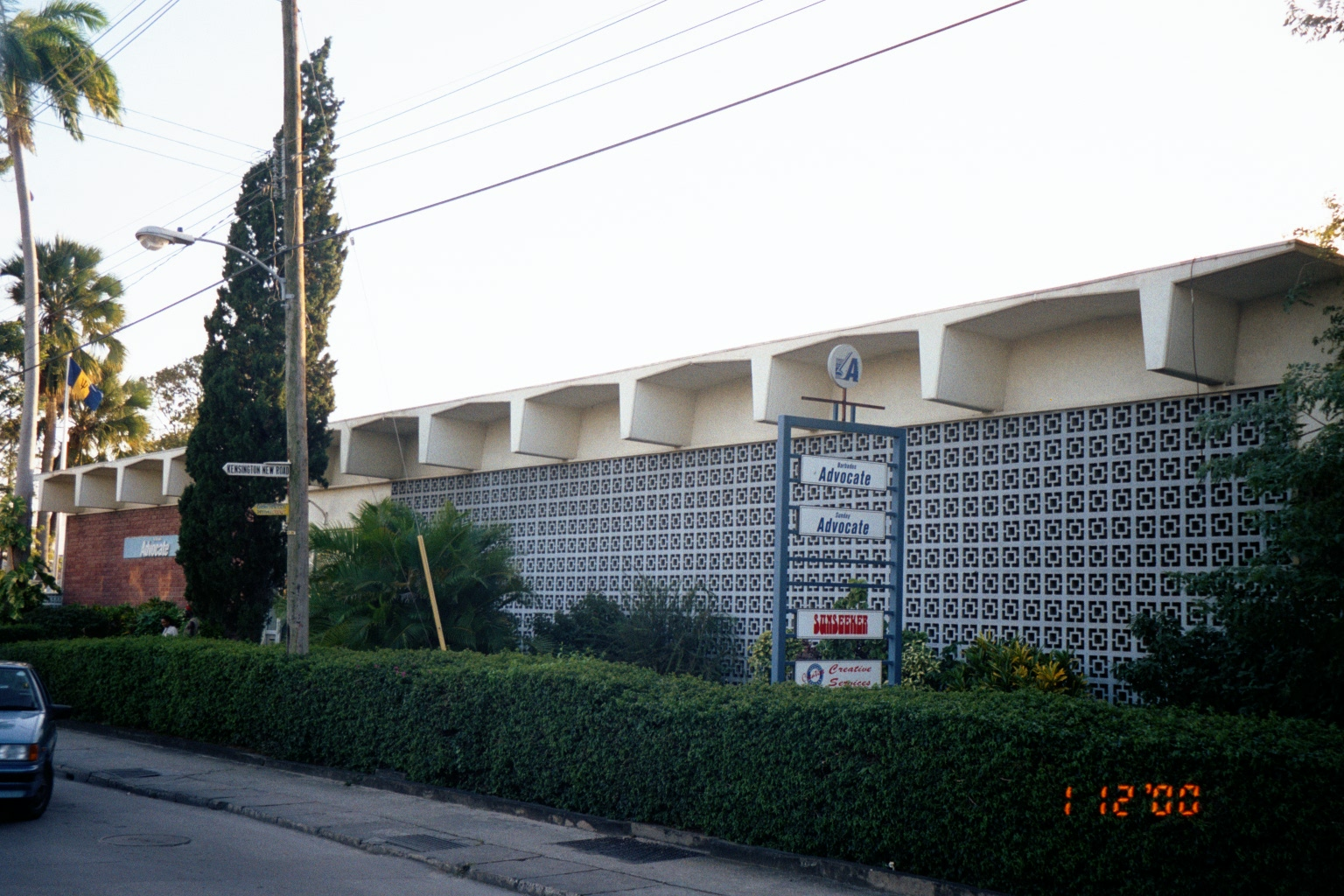
Barbados Advocate newspaper building in Fontabelle, Saint Michael, Barbados (2000).

The Barbados Advocate was a newspaper published in the Caribbean island of Barbados. Established in 1895, the Advocate was the country's longest continually-published outlet of its kind. By the time it ceased publication in 2023, it was also the country's second most-read daily newspaper.

== History ==
The Barbados Advocate was founded in 1895 by Valence Gale, who had gotten his start at the Barbados Agricultural Reporter. Gale died in 1908, leaving controlling interest in the paper to his wife, Clara Gale (née Chenery). Gale's son, Valence C. Gale, served as manager from 1919 and later managing director of the paper; his brother-in-law, C. L. Chenery as editor. When Chenery died in 1925, Gale's younger son, C. A. Louis Gale, served as the paper's editor for 30 years.

In 1946, the Advocate had a circulation of 7,000 on weekdays and 12,000 on Sundays, continuing to publish its original ownership.

In 1954, the newspaper joined the Inter American Press Association (IAPA). In 1960, it was joined by the Daily Star, which became a new Barbados' daily newspaper. In 1961, two British companies acquired a majority interest in the paper.

The newspaper was purchased by (the then) Anthony T. Bryan in 2000 and he became the first Black publisher in the newspaper's history. Bryan died in 2020, leading to a protracted legal battle over ownership of the paper.

== Content ==
The Advocate was a colour newspaper covering a wide array of topics, including:

- Business
- Sports
- Entertainment news
- Politics
- Editorials
- Special features
- Investigative journalism
- Local, regional, and international news

== Headquarters ==
The headquarters of the Barbados Advocate were located in the western-Bridgetown neighbourhood of Fontabelle in the parish of Saint Michael.

== See also ==
- Media in Barbados
- Barbadian companies
