= Barbados Cycling Union =

Sports governing body in Barbados

BCU logo

The Barbados Cycling Union or BCU is the national governing body of cycle racing in Barbados.

The BCU is a member of the UCI and COPACI.
