= Solar Dynamics =

Solar hot water manufacturer in Barbados

Solar Dynamics Barbados Ltd is one of the leading Barbados-based manufacturers of solar hot water systems in the Caribbean region. The company was established in 1972 by James Husbands, who became managing director.

The company says that it has installed over 30,000 solar hot water systems in homes and businesses mainly across the Caribbean region.

Just after Barbados became independent from Britain, the prime minister Errol Barrow and government of Barbados gave staunch support to the solar energy sector of Barbados.
