= Caribbean Tourism Organization =

Tourism agency based in Barbados

The Caribbean Tourism Organization (CTO) has as its main objective the development of sustainable tourism for the economic and social benefit of Caribbean people.

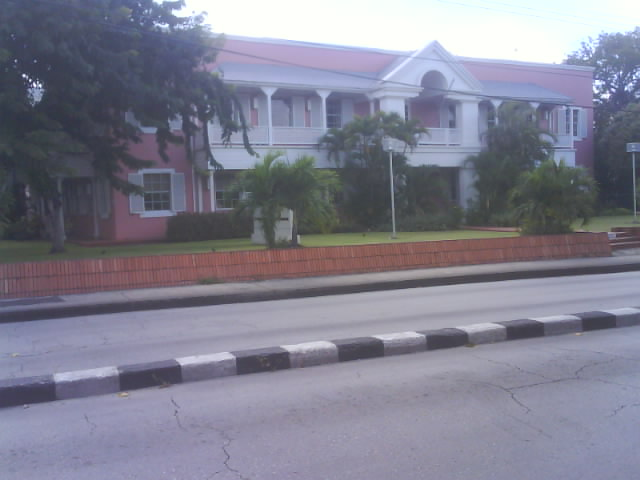
The Caribbean Tourism Organization headquarters

== Operations ==
The CTO, with headquarters in Barbados, is the Caribbean's tourism development agency. Its member countries and territories include the Dutch, English, French and Spanish, as well as a myriad of private sector allied members.

Among other functions, the organization provides specialized support and technical assistance in sustainable tourism development, marketing, communications, advocacy, human resource development, event planning and execution, and research and information technology.

The CTO is a marketing and business development entity dedicated to promoting the Caribbean brand worldwide. The CTO, with headquarters in Barbados, comprises 25 member states, including English, French, Spanish and Dutch countries and territories, as well as private sector allied members. These include the Caribbean Hotel Association. companies, organizations and persons providing products and services to the Caribbean tourism industry.

== History ==
The CTO was established in 1989 with the merger of the Caribbean Tourism Association (founded in 1951) and the Caribbean Tourism Research and Development Center (founded in 1974)

The body is primarily involved in the joint promotion and marketing of Caribbean tourist destinations in North America and Europe.

== Member countries ==
- Antigua and Barbuda
- Bahamas
- Barbados
- Belize
- Dominica
- French overseas departments:
  - Martinique
  - Saint Martin
- Grenada
- Guyana
- Haiti
- Jamaica
- Kingdom of the Netherlands:
  - Curaçao
  - Sint Eustatius
  - Sint Maarten
- Saint Kitts and Nevis
- Saint Lucia
- Saint Vincent and the Grenadines
- Trinidad and Tobago
- British overseas territories:
  - Anguilla
  - Bermuda
  - British Virgin Islands
  - Cayman Islands
  - Montserrat
  - Turks and Caicos Islands
- United States territories:
  - U.S. Virgin Islands

== See also ==
- World Tourism Organization
