= Barbados Bar Association =

Organization of Barbados

- Type: Bar association
- Region served: Barbados

The Barbados Bar Association is a voluntary association of attorneys in Barbados who practise at the independent bar as barristers and Queen's Counsel. It was created by the Barbados Bar Association Act of 1940.

== See also ==
- Commonwealth Lawyers Association (CLA)
