= Barbados Boy Scouts Association =

- Headquarters: Hazelwwod
- Location: Upper Collymore Rock, St. Michael
- Country: Barbados
- Membership: 1,305
- Chief Scout and President: Sir Marston Gibson
- Patron of Scouting: Sandra Mason
- Chief Commissioner (ag): Trevor Jones
- Website www.barbadosscouts.org

The Barbados Boy Scouts Association is the national Scouting organization of Barbados. The Association is managed by the National Scout Council and is a member of the World Organization of the Scout Movement. The boys only Barbados Boy Scouts Association has 1,305 members as of 2021.

The first Troop on the island was registered on 9 March 1912, at Combermere School and Mr. Matthew J. Springer was their first warranted Scout Leader. From 1912 to 1969, the local Association operated as a branch of the British Scout Association. On 20 February 1969, the BBSA Constitution was approved, making it 95th member of the World Scout Conference.

The island is divided into three districts - Bridgetown, Northern and Southern Districts.

The program emphasis is to develop good citizenship among boys by assisting in the formation and development of character; training them in habits of observation, obedience and self-reliance; inculcating loyalty, patriotism, courage and thoughtfulness for others; teaching them services useful to the public and handicrafts useful to themselves; promoting their physical, mental, moral and spiritual development.

Scouting is most active in Bridgetown, the capital city and the surrounding areas. The headquarters is located at Hazelwood, Collymore Rock, St. Michael.

Scouts are active in Caribbean activities and attend many camps and jamborees in neighboring Caribbean islands and further abroad.

The logo of the Barbados Boy Scouts Association incorporates the trident and color scheme of the flag of Barbados.

== See also ==
- The Girl Guides Association of Barbados
- Caribbean Cuboree
