= Barbados National Oil Company Limited =

The Barbados National Oil Company Limited (BNOCL or BNOC) is a national state-owned energy provider in the country of Barbados. Founded several decades ago, the company satisfies about 30% of the country's total consumption of oil and gas.

With approximately 90 000 homes across the island of Barbados, the company lays claims to having natural gas hookups with 70 000 of them. In addition to the many homes connect to the islands' natural gas infrastructure the company also supplies the Barbados Light and Power Company, the airport, and provides gas distribution for many of the islands' privately owned gas stations.

The country has an energy total requirement of around 2.9 million barrels (460,000 m^{3}) of oil per year. Of this amount the Barbados National Oil Company supplies Barbados with around 370,000 barrels (59,000 m^{3}) of oil per year.

Subsidies:

- The Barbados National Terminal Company Limited (BNTCL)
