= Broodhagen =

Broodhagen is a surname. Notable people with the surname include:

- Karl Broodhagen (1909–2002), Barbadian sculptor and painter
- Virgil Broodhagen (born 1943), Barbadian painter
