= Barbados–Cuba relations =

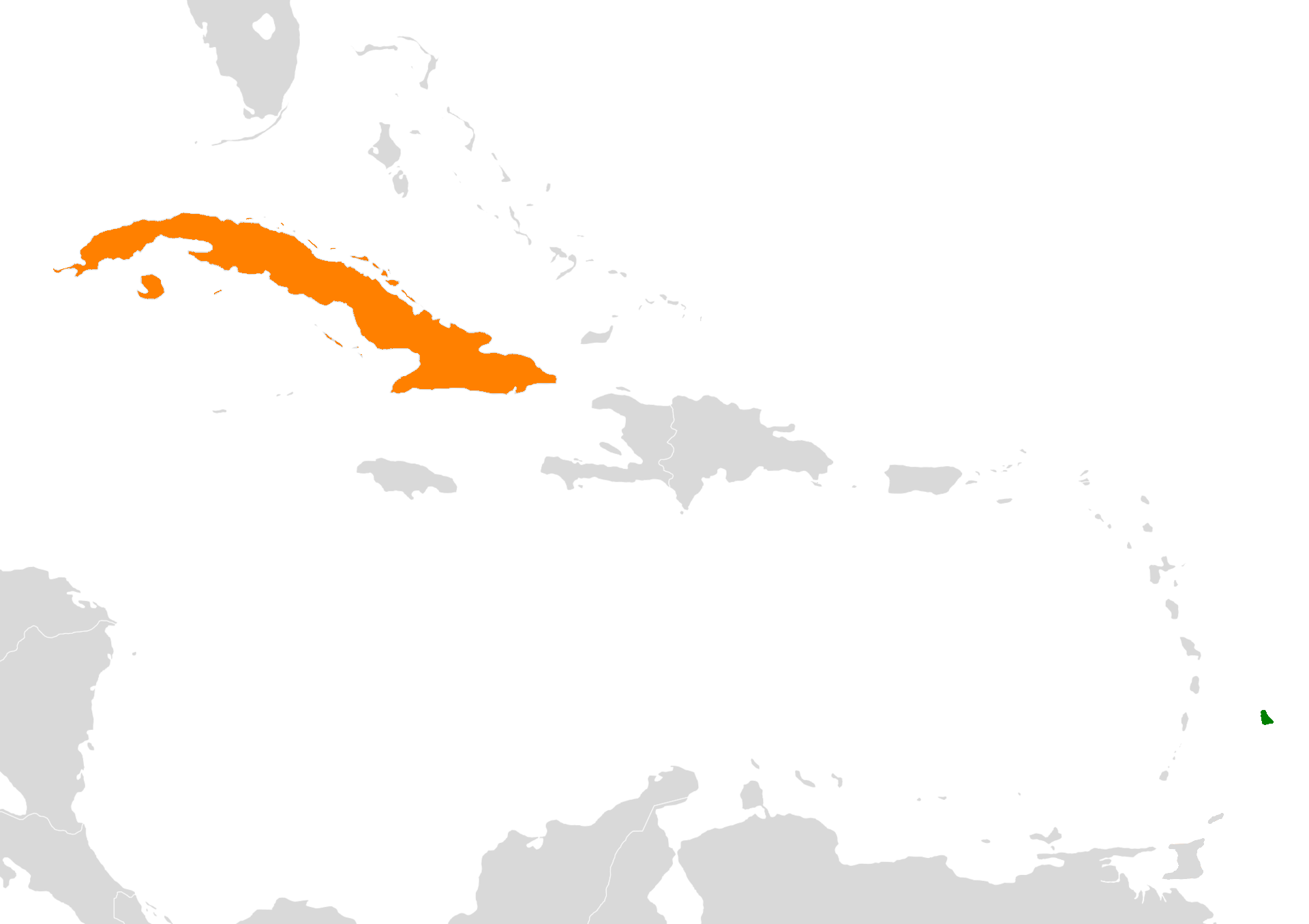

- Barbados: Cuba

Barbados–Cuba relations refers to the bilateral relations between Barbados and the Republic of Cuba. Barbados has an embassy in Havana and Cuba has an embassy in Bridgetown. Barbados and the Republic of Cuba are both members of the Association of Caribbean States, Belt and Road Initiative, the Community of Latin American and Caribbean States, ECLAC, EU-CARIFORUM, the Organisation of African, Caribbean and Pacific State and CARICOM.

== History ==
Barbados and the Republic of Cuba established formal diplomatic relations on 12 December 1972.

Barbados was one of the first nations in the Caribbean Community (CARICOM) bloc to form relations with the Republic of Cuba in 1972.

On October 6, 1976, the Cubana 455 flight was brought down by a terrorist bomb attack off the coast of Barbados 8 minutes after taking off from Grantley Adams International Airport. The Coordination of United Revolutionary Organizations, an organization linked to the CIA, was responsible for the bombing. A trial was held in Venezuela and Freddy Lugo and Hernán Ricardo Lozano both received 20 years in prison. Orlando Bosch was acquitted on all charges and Luis Posada Carriles was held for 8 years before escaping to America. Barbados later created a monument to the 73 victims of Cubana 455 flight which included 5 North Koreans and 11 Guyanese citizens. The monument was designed by Virgil Broodhagen. Cuban President Fidel Castro, the North Korean ambassador to Guyana and Guyanese Government Minister Reepu Daman Persaud attended the unveiling of the monument.

In 1999, Barbadian Prime Minister Owen Arthur was bestowed by Fidel Castro with Cuba's Order of José Martí award.

Cuba has sent 126 medical doctors, nurses and lab technologists from the Henry Reeve Brigade to Barbados to help the country fight COVID-19.

On July 18, 2021, the Government of Barbados called on the Biden administration to repeal the embargo on Cuba, stating it was the "morally right" thing to do.

On December 9, 2021, Prime Minister Mia Mottley celebrated the 49th anniversary of diplomatic relations with Cuba, Guyana, Trinidad and Tobago and Jamaica. She also denounced the embargo against Cuba and they would not be a part of the embargo.

== Trade ==
The countries have signed a number of bilateral deals including: A joint 1996 bilateral Free Trade Agreement that was later superseded by the 2005 Cuba-CARICOM free trade agreement, a 1996 Bilateral Investment Treaties (BIT), and a 2003 Double Taxation Agreement (DTA). In recent years Cuba has offered scholarships to students in Barbados to attend its medical schools such as Escuela Latinoamericana de Medicina (ELAM).

Barbados in 2019 exported US$6,840 worth of goods to Cuba with the largest export being hard liquor. Cuba exported US$193,000 worth of goods to Barbados with the most common export being rolled tobacco, usually in the form of Cuban cigars.

== See also ==
- Foreign relations of Barbados
- Foreign relations of Cuba
