= Transport Board =

Transport Board may refer to:

- Auckland Transport Board Act
- Barbados Transport Board
- Bucharest Metropolitan Transport Board
- Ceylon Transport Board
- Commonwealth Land Transport Board, Australia
- Japan Transport Safety Board
- London Passenger Transport Board
- London Transport Board
- Sri Lanka Transport Board
- Transport Board (Royal Navy)
- Ulster Transport Authority, formerly the Northern Ireland Road Transport Board
