= Virgil Broodhagen =

Barbadian painter

Virgil Broodhagen is a Barbadian painter known for his work in the art world. His paintings have been featured on stamps in Barbados and his paintings have been exhibited in various places in the Americas and Europe.

== History ==
Broodhagen was born in Barbados on 1 September 1943. He was educated at St. Mary's Boys School, Combermere Secondary School and the Barbados Technical Institute. He emigrated to Canada in 1966 and worked for the Canadian Government recording and designing for the restoration of historic buildings, archaeological sites and vessels. He holds a Bachelor of Fine Arts Degree from the University of Manitoba. In September 2001 Virgil and his father Karl Broodhagen celebrated 31 years of exhibiting together in Barbados. (Corrie Scott 2011)

Two paintings by Virgil were featured on stamps issued by the Barbados Postal Service in 1995 and 2008. Virgil has exhibited in Florence Italy, Cuba, London and throughout Canada and the U.S.A. He designed the Cubana Airline Monument in Barbados. A piece of his sculpture can be found in the Sculpture Peace Garden, Changchun, China. Broodhagen continues his work and appearances in the art community (as of 2018).

== Bibliography ==
- Barnum, Elizabeth Ann. "Creolization and Commodification of Art and Craft in Barbados." Ed.D., Teachers College, Columbia University, 1998.
- Broodhagen, Virgil, National Cultural Foundation (Barbados), and Queen's Park Gallery. The National Cultural Foundation Presents Virgil Broodhagen in Exhibition at the Queen’s Park Gallery, Barbados, 11th September - 5th October, 1988. Barbados: National Cultural Foundation, 1988.
- Putten, H.M. Van Der, Virgil Broodhagen, Parks Canada, Parks Canada, Engineering and Architecture, and Restoration Services. Red River Ox Cart as Built Drawings, April 1988. Ottawa, Ont.: Parks Canada, 1987.
