= Bussa's rebellion =

1816 failed slave revolt in British-ruled Barbados

Bussa's Rebellion
- Part of North American slave revolts
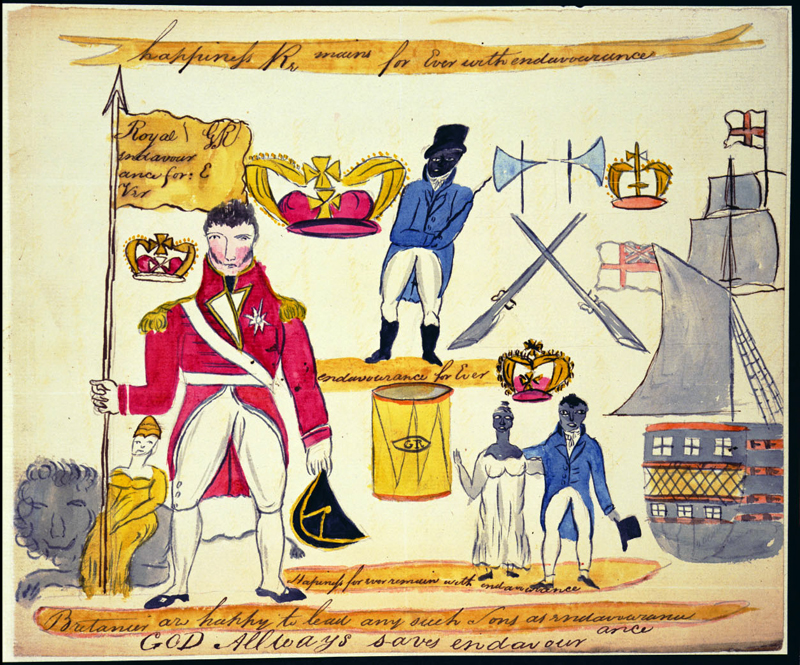
- Sketch of a flag used by the Bussa rebels including the slogan "Happiness Remains for Ever with endeavourance... Britannia are happy to lead any such Sons as endeavourance and God Always saves endeavour" [sic]
| Date | 14–16 April 1816 |
| Location | Barbados (Mostly St. Philip Parish) |
| Result | British victory |

Belligerents
| British Empire: British Leeward Islands | Rebelling Slaves |

Commanders and leaders
| (British Empire) James Leith; Col. Edward Codd | Bussa † |

Strength
| 800 soldiers; 3 cannons | ~400 (actively fighting) ~5,000 (total rebelling) |

Casualties and losses
| 1 soldier killed; 1 civilian killed | 50 killed in battle; 214 executed; 170 exiled; many mutilated |

Bussa's rebellion (14–16 April 1816) was the largest slave revolt in Barbadian history. The rebellion takes its name from the African-born slave, Bussa, who led the rebellion. The rebellion, which was eventually defeated by the colonial militia, was the first of three mass slave rebellions in the British West Indies that shook public faith in slavery in the years leading up to the abolition of slavery in the British Empire and emancipation of former slaves. It was followed by the Demerara rebellion of 1823 and by the Baptist War in Jamaica in 1831–1832; these are often referred to as the "late slave rebellions".

== Background ==
Barbados was a central commercial point to which slaves from the Gold Coast were imported before further dispersal to other British colonies such as Jamaica and British Guiana. Slaves were imported from the Gold Coast to Barbados from the 17th century onward to about the early 19th century. The slave revolt on 14 April 1816 in Barbados was led by a slave named Bussa. Not much is known about his life before the revolt; scholars today are currently debating his possible origins. Bussa was likely a Coromantee, yet there is also reasonable speculation that he may have descended from the Igbo peoples of modern-day south-eastern Nigeria. It is also possible that Bussa had both ancestries since slaves trafficked before the rebellion (mid- to late 16th-century shift in colonial demand for African slaves from the Slave Coast) were transported primarily from the Gold Coast and underwent subsequent creolization of the island's African slave population. The Bussa's Rebellion, along with other persistent slave rebellions throughout the Caribbean, had given the British Colonial government a further incentive to pass and enact the Slavery Abolition Act 1833, officially abolishing slavery as an institution in all of its Caribbean territories.

== Bussa ==
Bussa (/ˈbʌsə/) was born a free man in West Africa of possible Igbo descent and was captured by African merchants, sold to European slave traders and transported to Barbados in the late 18th century as a slave, where under the Barbados Slave Code slavery had been legal since 1661. Not much is known about him and there are no earlier records of him, and virtually no biographical information about Bussa is available. Records show a slave named "Bussa" was a ranger (a head officer among the slaves) on "Bayley's Plantation" in the parish of Saint Philip around the time of the rebellion. This position would have given Bussa more freedom of movement than the average slave and would have made it easier for him to plan and coordinate the rebellion.

== Revolt ==
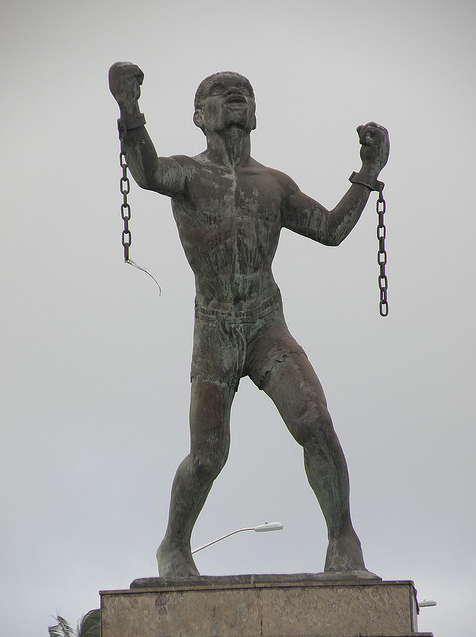
Emancipation Statue (1985) in Bridgetown

The revolts arose at a time when the British Parliament was working on schemes to ameliorate the conditions of slaves in the Caribbean. Preparation for this rebellion began soon after the House of Assembly discussed and rejected the Imperial Registry Bill in November 1815, which would have registered West Indian slaves. Historians believe that slaves interpreted some of the parliamentary proposals as preparatory to emancipation and took action when emancipation did not take place.

Among Bussa's collaborators were Joseph Pitt Washington Franklin (a free man), John and Nanny Grigg, a senior domestic slave, and Jackey on Simmons' Plantation as well as other slaves, drivers, and artisans. Jackey was a Creole driver who was an important figure. The planning was undertaken at a number of sugar estates, including Bailey's plantation, where it began. By February 1816, Bussa was an African driver, one of the few in his position. He and his collaborators decided to start the revolt on 14 April, Easter Sunday.

Bussa, King Wiltshire, Dick Bailey, and Johnny led the slaves into battle at Bailey's Plantation on Tuesday, 16 April. He commanded some 400 rebels, men and women, most of whom were believed to be Creole, born in the islands. He was killed in battle, but his forces continued the fight until they were defeated by superior firepower of the colonial militia. The rebellion failed, but its influence was significant to the future of Barbados.

== Legacy ==
Bussa remains a popular figure in Barbados.

In 1985, 169 years after his rebellion, the Emancipation Statue, created by Karl Broodhagen, was unveiled in Haggatt Hall, in the parish of St Michael. Many Barbadians attributed the statue to Bussa and nicknamed it "Bussa's Statue".

In 1998, the Parliament of Barbados named Bussa as one of the eleven National Heroes of Barbados.
