= Emancipation Statue =

Monument to slave Bussa in Barbados

Coordinates: 13°6′18.12″N 59°34′48.32″W

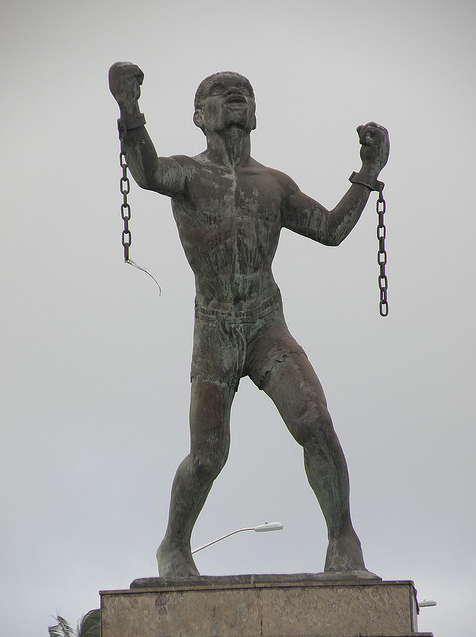
- Medium: Bronze sculpture
- Subject: Slavery
- Location: Bridgetown, Barbados

The Emancipation Statue is a public sculpture symbolising the "breaking of the chains" of slavery at Emancipation. It is located in Barbados, east of Bridgetown at centre of the J.T.C. Ramsay roundabout formed at the junction of the ABC Highway and Highway 5. Many Barbadians refer to the statue as Bussa, the name of a slave who helped inspire a revolt against the plantocracy society in Barbados in 1816, though the statue is not actually sculpted to be Bussa.

The statue, made of bronze, was created in 1985 by Barbadian-Guyanese sculptor Karl Broodhagen 20 years after the island's independence.

In 1998 the Cuban President, Fidel Castro delivered an impassioned speech at the statue during his visit to Barbados.

The statue sparked a debate on Twitter in 2017 as it reminded many that such representations of freed slaves did not exist in the USA.

== Inscription ==
Lick an Lock-up Done Wid, Hurray fuh Jin-Jin [Queen Victoria].
De Queen come from England to set we free

Now Lick an Lock-up Done Wid, Hurray fuh Jin-Jin

This was the chant of thousands of Barbadians when slavery was abolished in 1838, signifying their freedom, joy and happiness, five years after the passage of the Slavery Abolition Act 1833.

== See also ==
- List of slaves
- Coffy (person)
- Emancipation Park (Kingston, Jamaica)
- Emancipation Memorial (Washington D.C.)
- Emancipation Memorial (Boston)
- Emancipation and Freedom Monument
