= Henry Powell (governor) =

English settler, captain, and planter

- Born: About 1600; England
- Died: About 1658 (aged 58); Barbados
- Occupation: Captain in Colonial Britain
- Known for: Early colonialist of the island of Barbados

Henry Powell (c. 1600–1658), was an early English settler, captain, and planter on the Barbados Colony.

Little is known about Captain Henry Powell, brother to Captain John Powell and uncle of Governor John Powell Junior, who became a planter and leading player in the early colonization of the island of Barbados in the mid-17 century.

== Powell in Barbados ==
In 1625, whilst returning from Brazil, his brother, Captain John Powell briefly landed on the leeward coast of the inhabited island of ‘Barbadoes’ and in traditional manner claimed it in the name of his monarch King James I of England and James VI of Scotland.

Rushing back to England John Powell sought aid and sponsorship from Sir William Courteen (a royalist) along with Peter Courteen, John Moncy and his own brother Henry Powell to settle the island, against an opposing faction in the roundhead Earl James Hay.

With Henry Powell placed in command of 80 men on board a ship, so began the fraught colonization and early founding of the island of Barbados as this small number of people (which included ten captured negroes) landed at what was to become Holetown on 20 February 1627. A struggle began to claim ownership and begin this new world for themselves and to expand the British domain for its monarchy. Henry's nephew, also named John Powell Jr was put in charge as governor.

Governance and law was in much dispute from this early period with Hay and Charles Wolverston also seeking and being granted Governorship of the island and they soon appointed twelve assistants with John Swan (as first lieutenant governor), followed by the having Governor John Powell, Jnr and some of his supporters arrested.

Wolverston had himself named governor of the entire island and Carlisle was acknowledged as ‘lord and owner of the said island’, it was not long before the Courteen group through Philip Herbert had John Powell Jr reconfirmed as the island's governor.

However Henry Powell returned with 100 men as reinforcement and on 26 February 1629 freed his nephew and jailed Wolverston (along with deputy governor William Deane, who had changed sides).

Just three months later (9 April 1629) his nephew, the Governor, was taken prisoner and after almost a month in chains was subsequently taken by Spaniards to the island of Nevis all of which caused his death.

At the end of his own life Henry Powell gave a deposition (25 February 1657) recounting these events, this was shortly before he granted his Indian slaves their freedom.
