= Barbados Transport Board =

The Barbados Transport Board (BTB) is a public transportation authority of the government of Barbados. The BTB operates numerous fixed-route bus services throughout much of the country.

== History ==
The BTB was approved in June 1955 by draft legislation of the Governor of Barbados. The Transport Board was established three months later, on 24 August 1955, by an Act of Parliament.

In 2015, the Board was one of 5 state-owned enterprises chosen to pilot a new performance management framework.

== Infrastructure ==
The BTB's headquarters are located at Weymouth, Roebuck Street, area.

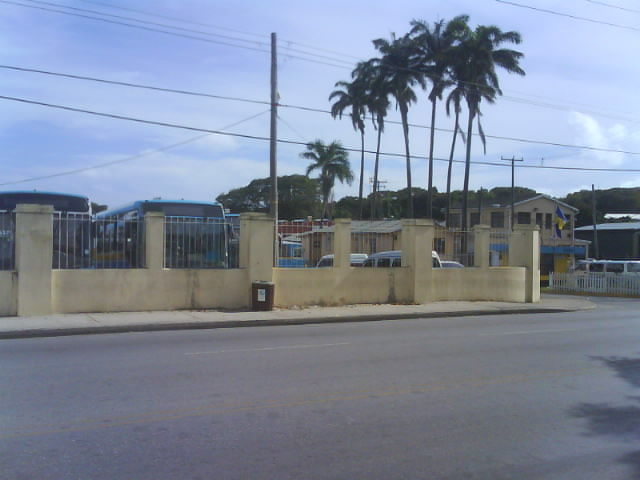
Barbados Transport Board buses at the Weymouth Headquarters and Bus Depot in Roebuck Street, Saint Michael on 26 September 2010.

There are three terminals:

- a main terminal at Fairchild Street in Saint Michael, Bridgetown;
- the Constitution River Terminal, located just across the river from the Main Terminal;
- the Princess Alice Terminal also Saint Michael and
- the Speightstown Terminal in Speightstown in the north.

There are three bus depots located at:

- Weymouth, Saint Michael;
- Oistins, Christ Church;
- Mangrove, Saint Philip.

== Fleet ==
In 2007, the BTB introduced 70 new buses, with 65 more buses on the way including 5 for people with disabilities, the government floated the idea of reintroducing rail.

In January 2026, the BTB added 35 new electric buses to the fleet, bringing the total fleet number to 121 buses.

The agency's buses are blue in colour with a yellow trim and white top. The BTB compete with the privately owned white and maroon stripe coloured route taxis (called ZRs) and the yellow and blue stripe coloured mini-buses.

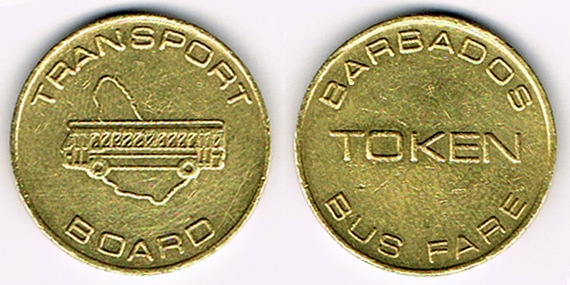
Tokens, each valid for one ride.

== Fares ==
In the past, the buses had conductors to collect fares. However, in the 1990s automatic fare collection machines were introduced on all buses. The new Wayfarer bus ticket system was introduced in April 2005 for all BTB buses.
