= Karl Broodhagen =

Barbadian artist

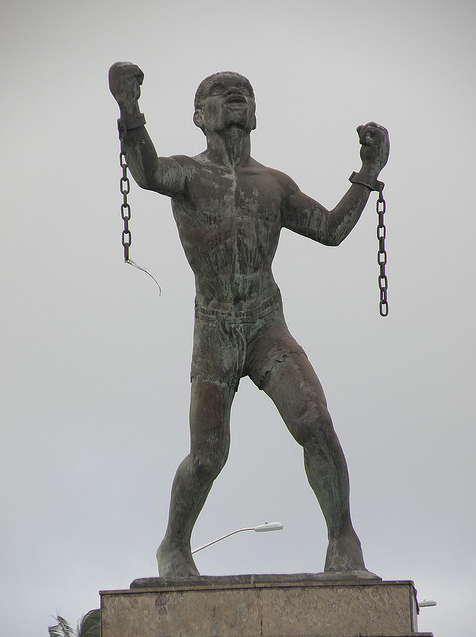
Bussa Emancipation Statue

Karl Broodhagen (1909 – 2002) was a Barbadian sculptor and painter. His most famous works are three public statues in Barbados: the Bussa Emancipation Statue, a statue of Prime Minister Grantley Herbert Adams, and a statue of cricketer Garfield Sobers.

== Biography ==
Born in Georgetown, Guyana, Broodhagen moved to Barbados at the age of 15 to become a tailor's apprentice. While working as a tailor, he began to paint in the 1930s and to sculpt a decade later. He established the art department at Barbados' Combermere School in 1947; after studying at Goldsmiths College in London in the early 1950s, he returned to Barbados and taught at the school until 1996.

In addition to his public statues, Broodhagen primarily created portraits and busts; he described the focus of his work as being "interested in people". He particularly focused on women, and stated in an interview that he sought "to replace the European standards of beauty still slavishly accepted in the West Indies by standards based on the local inhabitants themselves." His works have toured internationally and are included in UNESCO's collections, and he was awarded the Gold Crown of Merit in 1982.

He died at home in 2002, aged 93.

== Gallery ==
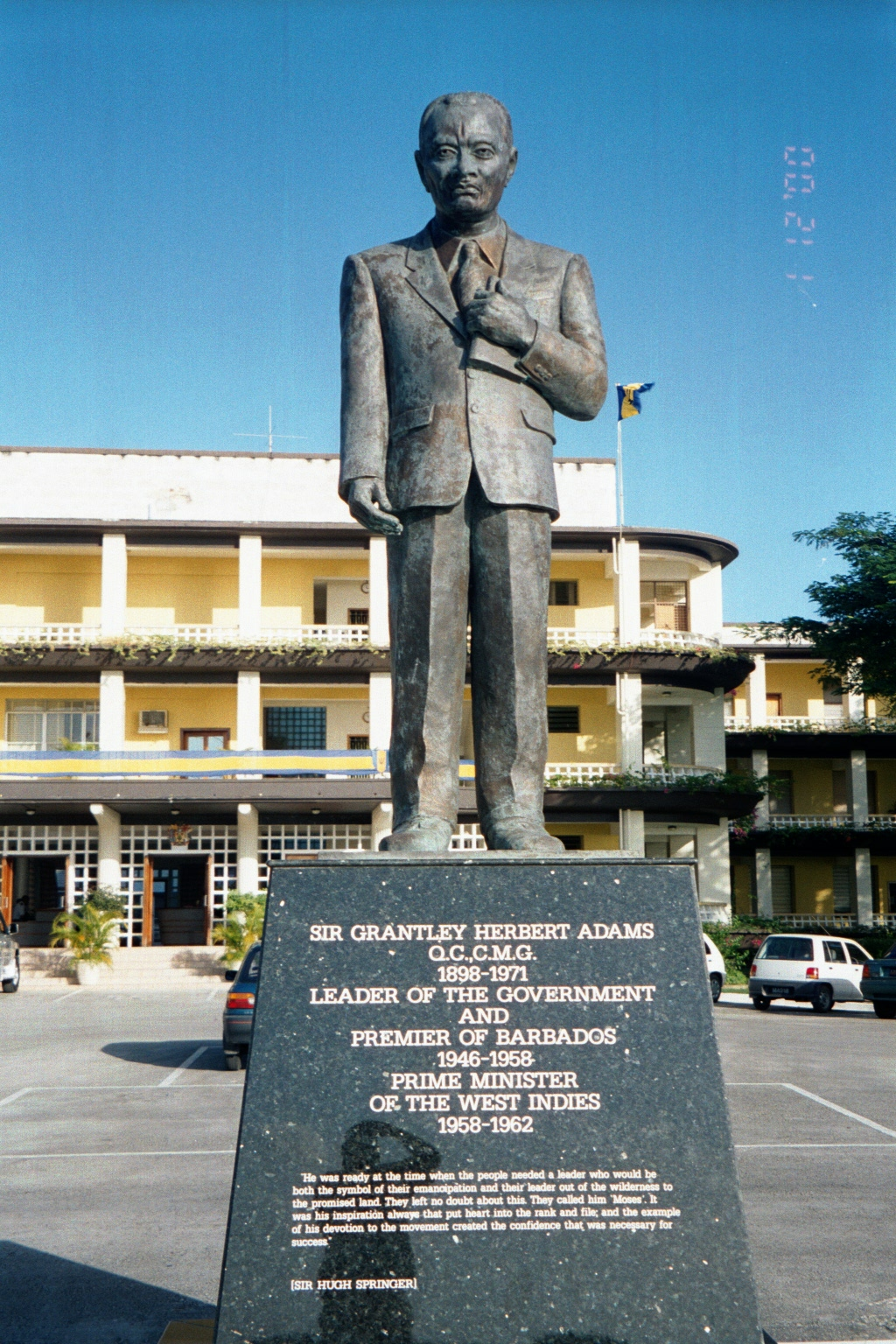
Statue of Grantley Herbert Adams

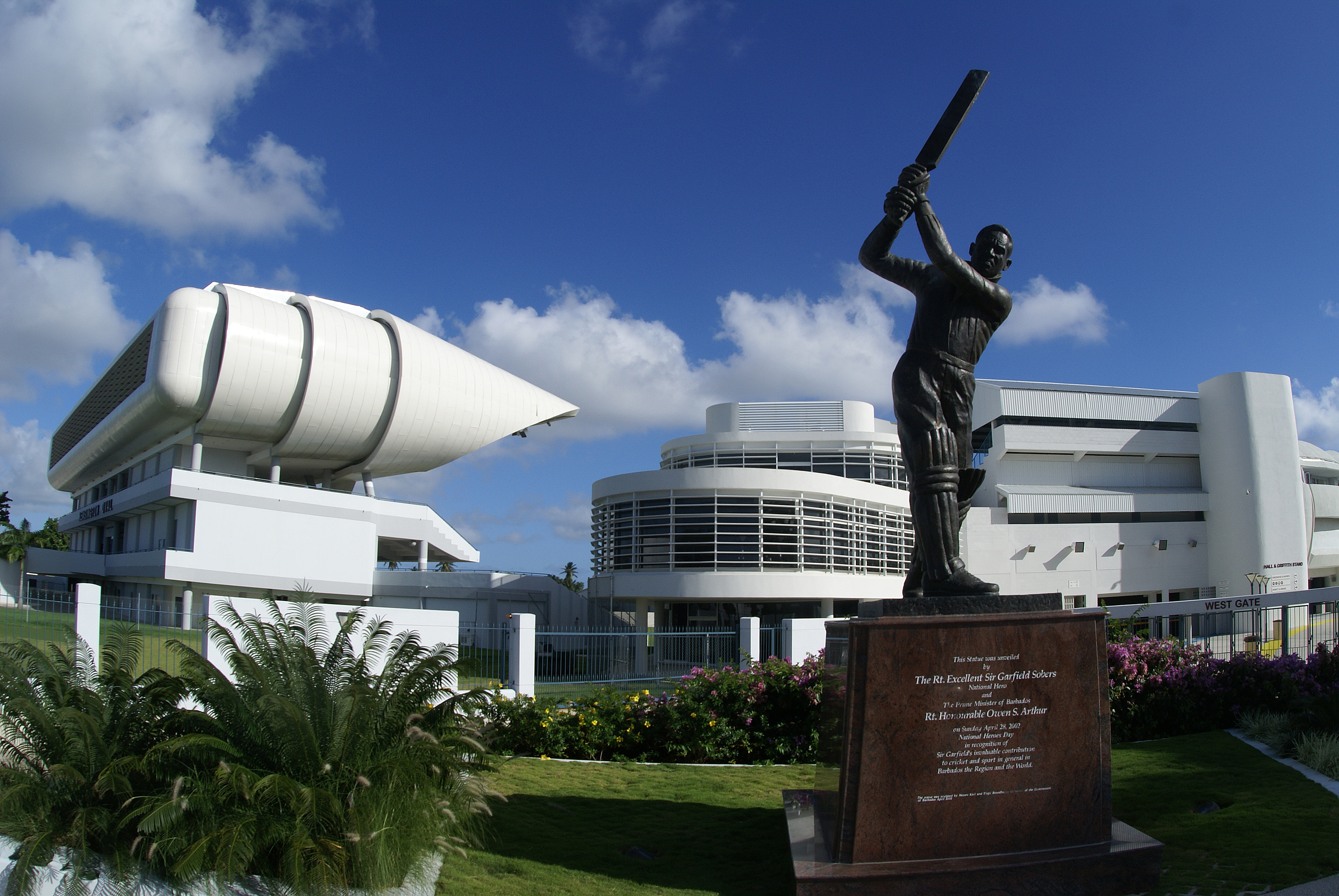
Statue of Garfield Sobers
