= Barbados =

Island nation in the Atlantic Ocean

- Flag Coat of arms
- Motto: "Pride and Industry"
- Anthem: "National Anthem of Barbados"
- Capital and largest city: Bridgetown; 13°05′52″N 59°37′06″W
- Official languages: English
- Vernacular language: Bajan Creole
- Ethnic groups (2020): 92.4% African; 3.1% Mixed; 2.7% White; 1.3% Indian; 0.3% others
- Religion (2020): 75.6% Christianity; 20.6% No religion; 2.0% Baháʼí Faith; 1.3% Islam; 0.5% others
- Demonyms: Barbadian; Bajan
- Government: Unitary parliamentary republic
  - President: Jeffrey Bostic
  - Prime Minister: Mia Mottley
- Legislature: Parliament
  - Upper house: Senate
  - Lower house: House of Assembly

Independence from the United Kingdom
  - Part of the West Indies Federation: 03 January 1958 – 31 May 1962
  - Barbados Independence Act 1966 as a Commonwealth realm: 30 November 1966
  - Admitted to the UN: 07 December 1966
  - Joined CARICOM at the Treaty of Chaguaramas: 01 August 1973
  - Republic established: 30 November 2021

Area
  - Total: 439 km^{2} (169 sq mi) (183rd)
  - Water (%): Negligible

Population
  - 2023 estimate: 281,998 (174th)
  - 2021 census: 269,090 (174th)
  - Density: 660/km^{2} (1,709.4/sq mi) (17th)
- GDP (PPP): 2023 estimate
  - Total: ▲$5.436 billion (175th)
  - Per capita: ▲$18,738 (90th)
- GDP (nominal): 2023 estimate
  - Total: ▲$6.220 billion (165th)
  - Per capita: ▲$21,442 (50th)
- Gini (2016): ▼34.1 medium inequality
- HDI (2023): ▲0.811 very high (69th)
- Currency: Barbadian dollar ($) (BBD)
- Time zone: UTC−04:00 (AST)
- Date format: dd/mm/yyyy
- Calling code: +1
- ISO 3166 code: BB
- Internet TLD: .bb

Barbados (Note: UK: /bɑːrˈbeɪdɒs/ bah-BAY-doss; US: /bɑːrˈbeɪdoʊs/ bar-BAY-dohss; locally /bɑːrˈbeɪdəs/ bar-BAY-dəss) is an island nation in the Atlantic Ocean. It is part of the Lesser Antilles of the West Indies and is the southernmost and easternmost island of the Caribbean region. It lies on the boundary of the South American and Caribbean tectonic plates. Its capital and largest city is Bridgetown.

Inhabited by Kalinago people since the 13th century, and prior to that by other Indigenous peoples, the island was originally named Ichirouganaim. It was claimed for the Crown of Castile by Spanish navigators in the late 15th century, who named it Barbudos, and it first appeared on a Spanish map in 1511. The Portuguese Empire claimed the island between 1532 and 1536, but abandoned it in 1620; their only traces were the introduction of wild boars intended as a supply of meat whenever the island was visited. The indigenous population had mostly been sold into slavery, killed, or died of disease by that time.

An English ship, the Olive Blossom, arrived in Barbados on 14 May 1625; its men took possession of the island in the name of King James I. In 1627, the first permanent settlers arrived from England, and Barbados became an English and later British colony. During this period, the colony operated on a plantation economy, relying initially on the labour of Irish indentured servants and subsequently African slaves, who worked on the island's plantations. Slavery continued until it was phased out through most of the British Empire by the Slavery Abolition Act 1833. The descendants of these enslaved Africans now account for over 90% of the island's population.

On 30 November 1966, Barbados moved toward political independence and assumed the status of a Commonwealth realm, becoming a sovereign state with Elizabeth II as Queen of Barbados. On 30 November 2021, Barbados transitioned to a republic within the Commonwealth, replacing its monarchy with a ceremonial president.

Barbados is ranked as one of the Caribbean's leading tourist destinations.

== Etymology ==
The name "Barbados" is from either the Portuguese term os barbados or the Spanish equivalent, los barbados, both meaning "the bearded ones". Whether "bearded" refers to the long, hanging roots of the bearded fig tree (Ficus citrifolia), a species of banyan indigenous to the island, or to the allegedly bearded Kalinago (Island Caribs) who once inhabited the island, or, more fancifully, to a visual impression of a beard formed by the sea foam that sprays over the outlying coral reefs is unclear. In 1519, a map produced by Genoese mapmaker Visconte Maggiolo showed and named Barbados in its correct position. Furthermore, the island of Barbuda in the Leeward Islands has a very similar name, and historical confusion between the two islands is documented. On a 1566 map by Bolognino Zaltieri, Barbuda appears under the name "Las Barbuda".

The original name for Barbados in the pre-Columbian era was Ichirouganaim, according to accounts by descendants of the Indigenous Arawakan-speaking tribes in other regional areas, with possible translations including "Red land with white teeth" or "Redstone island with teeth outside (reefs)" or simply "Teeth".

Colloquially, Barbadians refer to their home island as "Bim" or other nicknames associated with Barbados, including "Bimshire". The origin is uncertain, but several theories exist. The National Cultural Foundation of Barbados says that "Bim" was a word commonly used by slaves, and that it derives from the Igbo term bém from bé mụ́ meaning "my home, kindred, kind"; the Igbo phoneme [e] in the Igbo orthography is very close to /ɪ/. The name could have arisen due to the relatively large percentage of Igbo slaves from modern-day southeastern Nigeria arriving in Barbados in the 18th century. The words "Bim" and "Bimshire" are recorded in the Oxford English Dictionary and Chambers Twentieth Century Dictionaries. Another possible source for "Bim" is reported to be in the Agricultural Reporter of 25 April 1868, where the Rev. N. Greenidge (father of one of the island's most famous scholars, Abel Hendy Jones Greenidge) suggested that Bimshire was "introduced by an old planter listing it as a county of England". Expressly named were "Wiltshire, Hampshire, Berkshire and Bimshire". Lastly, in the Daily Argosy (of Demerara, i.e. Guyana) of 1652, there is a reference to Bim as a possible corruption of "Byam", the name of a Royalist leader against the Parliamentarians. That source suggested the followers of Byam became known as "Bims" and that this became a word for all Barbadians.

== History ==
=== Geological history ===
Around 700,000 years ago, the island emerged from the ocean as a body of soft rock known as a diapir rose from the mantle beneath its present-day location. This process is still ongoing, raising Barbados at an average rate of 30 centimetres per thousand years. Dozens of inland sea reefs still dominate coastal features within terraces and cliffs on the island.

=== Pre-colonial period ===
Archeological evidence suggests humans may have first settled or visited the island c. 1600 BC. More permanent Amerindian settlement of Barbados dates to about the 4th to 7th centuries AD, by a group known as the Saladoid-Barrancoid. Settlements of Arawaks from South America appeared by around 800 AD and again in the 12th–13th century. The Kalinago (called "Caribs" by the Spanish) visited the island regularly, although there is no evidence of permanent settlement.

=== European arrival ===
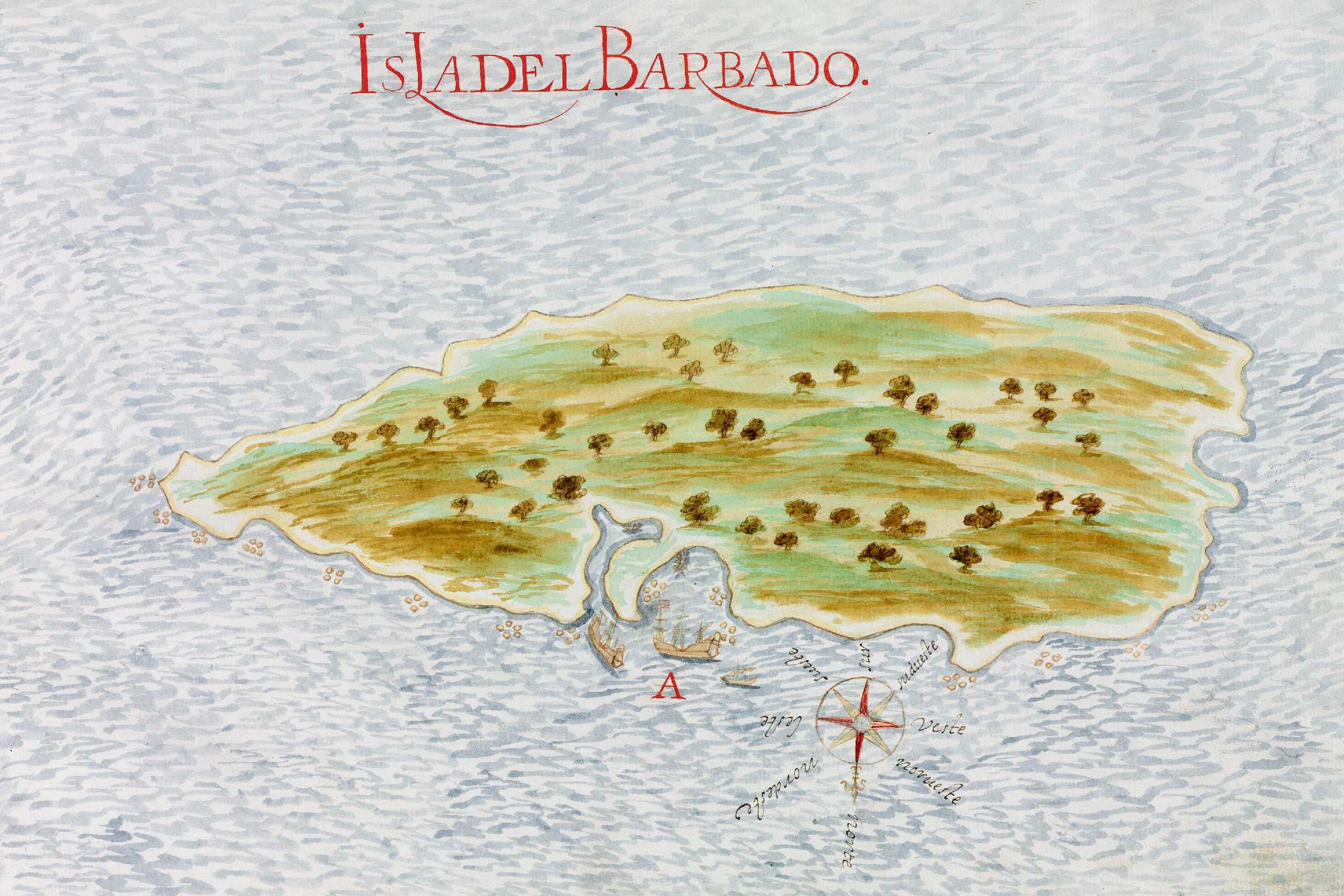
Spanish map of the island (1632)

The first Europeans arrived at some time in the 15th or 16th century, but it is uncertain which European nation this was. One lesser-known source points to earlier revealed works antedating contemporary sources, indicating it could have been the Spanish. Many, if not most, believe it was the Portuguese, en route to Brazil. The island was largely ignored by Europeans, though Spanish slave raiding is thought to have reduced the native population, with many fleeing to other islands.

=== English settlement in the 17th century ===
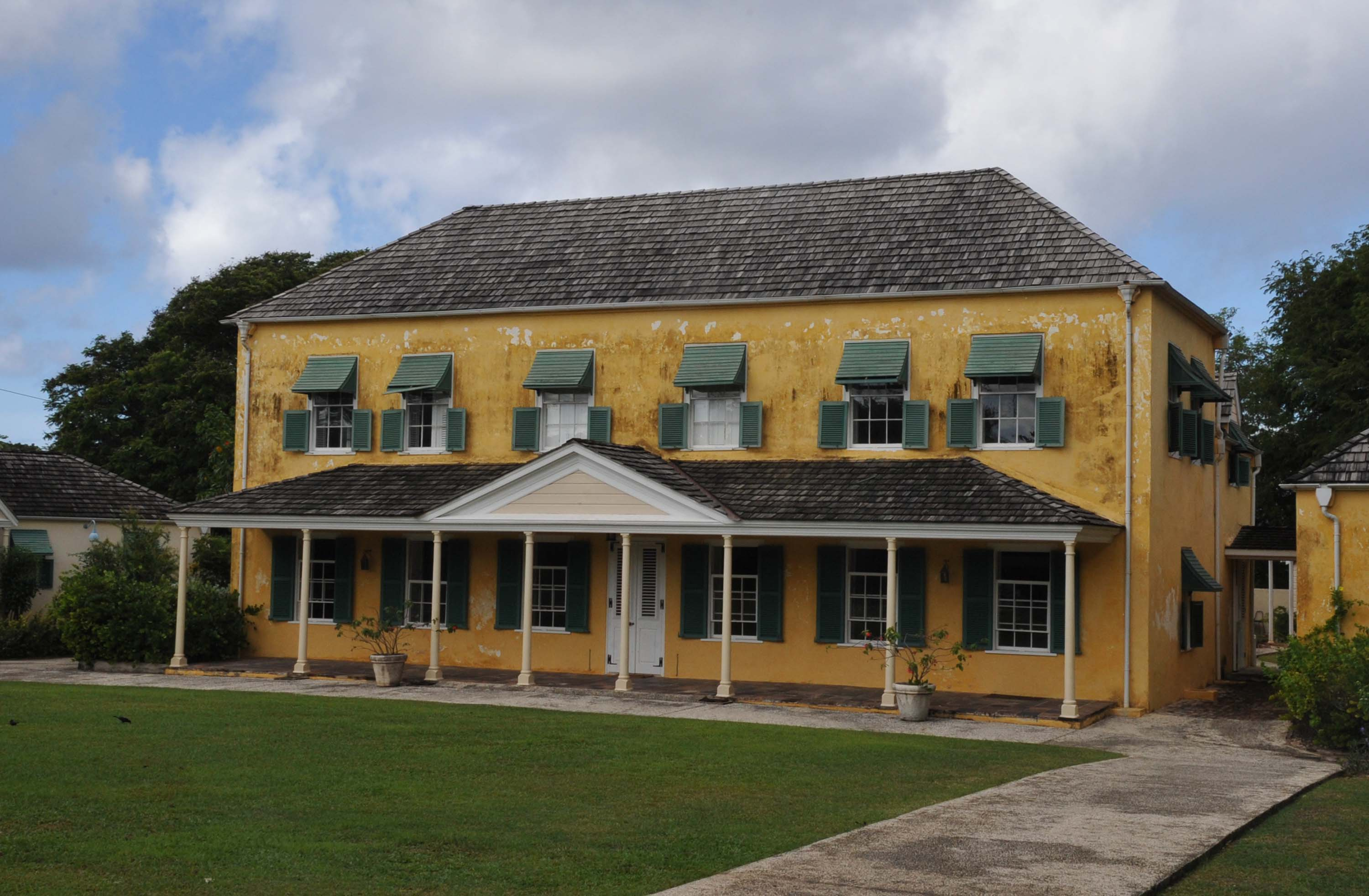
George Washington House was visited by George Washington in 1751, in what is believed to have been his only trip outside the present-day United States.

The first English ship, which had arrived on 14 May 1625, was captained by John Powell. The first settlement began on 17 February 1627, near what is now Holetown (formerly Jamestown, after King James I of England), by a group led by John Powell's younger brother, Henry, consisting of 80 settlers and 10 English indentured labourers. Some sources state that some Africans were among these first settlers.

The settlement was established as a proprietary colony and funded by Sir William Courten, a City of London merchant who acquired the title to Barbados and several other islands. The first colonists were actually tenants, and much of the profits of their labour returned to Courten and his company. Courten's title was later transferred to James Hay, 1st Earl of Carlisle, in what was called the "Great Barbados Robbery". Carlisle then chose as governor Henry Powell, who established the House of Assembly in 1639, in an effort to appease the planters, who might otherwise have opposed his controversial appointment.

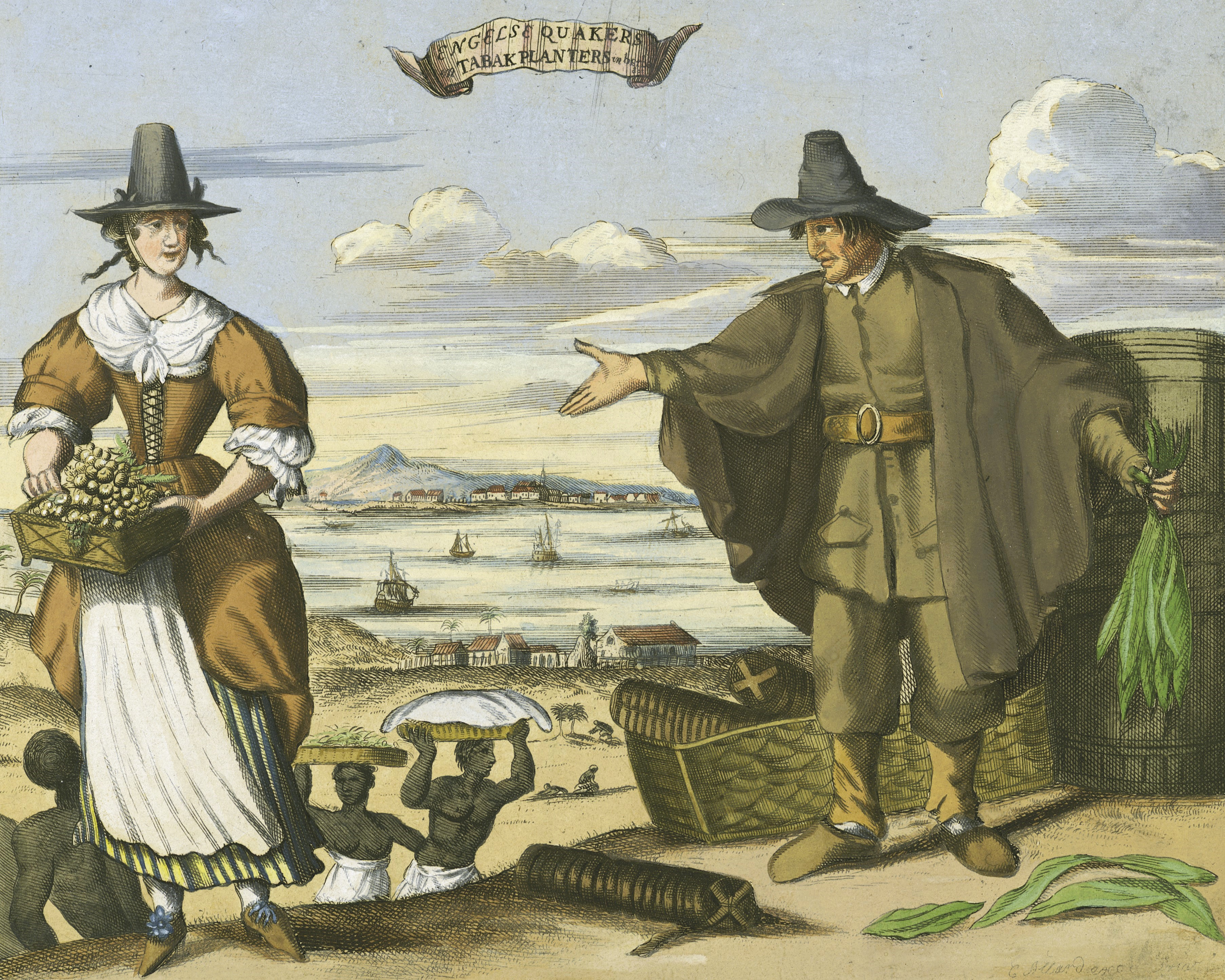
English tobacco planters and slaves in Barbados, 17th century

In the period 1640–1660, the West Indies attracted more than two-thirds of the total number of English emigrants to the Americas. By 1650, there were 44,000 settlers in the West Indies, as compared to 12,000 on the Chesapeake and 23,000 in New England. Most English arrivals were indentured. After five years of labour, they were given "freedom dues" of about £10, usually in goods. Before the mid-1630s, they also received 5 to 10 acres (2 to 4 hectares) of land, but after that time the island filled and there was no more free land. During the Cromwellian era (1650s) this included a large number of prisoners-of-war, vagrants and people who were illicitly kidnapped, who were forcibly transported to the island and sold as servants. These last two groups were predominantly Irish, as several thousand were infamously rounded up by English merchants and sold into servitude in Barbados and other Caribbean islands during this period, a practice that came to be known as being Barbadosed. Cultivation of sugar was thus handled primarily by European indentured labour until it became difficult to bring more indentured servants from England.

Parish registers from the 1650s show that, for the white population, there were four times as many deaths as marriages. The mainstay of the infant colony's economy was the growth export of tobacco, but tobacco prices eventually fell in the 1630s as Chesapeake production expanded.

==== Effects of the English Civil War ====
Around the same time, fighting during the War of the Three Kingdoms and the Interregnum spilled over into Barbados and Barbadian territorial waters. The island was not involved in the war until after the execution of Charles I, when the island's government fell under the control of Royalists (ironically the Governor, Philip Bell, remaining loyal to Parliament while the Barbadian House of Assembly, under the influence of Humphrey Walrond, supported Charles II). To try to bring the recalcitrant colony to heel, the Commonwealth Parliament passed an act on 3 October 1650 prohibiting trade between England and Barbados, and because the island also traded with the Netherlands, further Navigation Acts were passed, prohibiting any but English vessels trading with Dutch colonies. These acts were a precursor to the First Anglo-Dutch War. The Commonwealth of England sent an invasion force under the command of Sir George Ayscue, which arrived in October 1651. Ayscue, with a smaller force that included Scottish prisoners, surprised a larger force of Royalists, but had to resort to spying and diplomacy ultimately. On 11 January 1652, the Royalists in the House of Assembly led by Lord Willoughby surrendered, which marked the end of royalist privateering as a major threat. The conditions of the surrender were incorporated into the Charter of Barbados (Treaty of Oistins), which was signed at the Mermaid's Inn, Oistins, on 17 January 1652.

=== Irish people in Barbados ===
Starting with Cromwell, a large percentage of the white labourer population were indentured servants and involuntarily transported people from Ireland. Irish servants in Barbados were often treated poorly, and Barbadian planters gained a reputation for cruelty. The decreased appeal of an indenture on Barbados, combined with enormous demand for labour caused by sugar cultivation, led to the use of involuntary transportation to Barbados as a punishment for crimes, or for political prisoners, and also to the kidnapping of labourers who were deported to Barbados. Irish indentured servants were a significant portion of the population throughout the period when white servants were used for plantation labour in Barbados, and while a "steady stream" of Irish servants entered Barbados throughout the 17th century, Cromwellian efforts to pacify Ireland created a "veritable tidal wave" of Irish labourers who were sent to Barbados during the 1650s. Due to inadequate historical records, the total number of Irish labourers sent to Barbados is unknown, and estimates have been "highly contentious". One historical source estimated that as many as 50,000 Irish people were deported to either Barbados or Virginia during the 1650s. Another estimate that 12,000 Irish prisoners had arrived in Barbados by 1655 has been described by historian Richard B. Sheridan. According to historian Thomas Bartlett, it is "generally accepted" that approximately 10,000 Irish were deported to the West Indies and approximately 40,000 came as voluntary indentured servants, while many also travelled as voluntary, un-indentured emigrants.

==== The sugar revolution ====
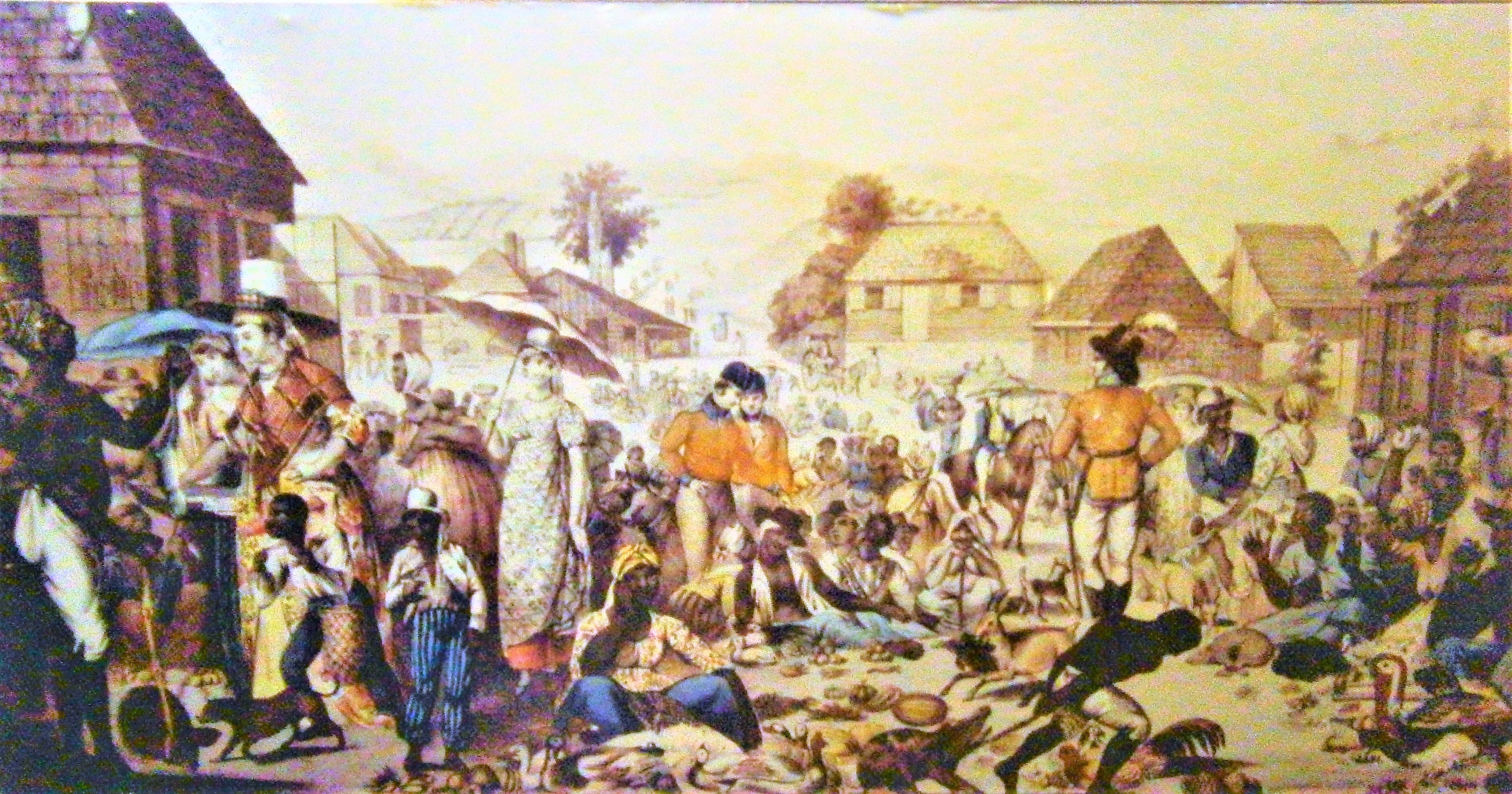
Sunday market in Barbados during the colonial era

The introduction of sugar cane from Dutch Brazil in 1640 completely transformed society, the economy and the physical landscape. Barbados eventually had one of the world's biggest sugar industries. One group instrumental in ensuring the early success of the industry was the Sephardic Jews, who had originally been expelled from the Iberian peninsula, to end up in Dutch Brazil. As the effects of the new crop increased, so did the shift in the ethnic composition of Barbados and surrounding islands. The workable sugar plantation required a large investment and a great deal of heavy labour. At first, Dutch traders supplied the equipment, financing, and African slaves, in addition to transporting most of the sugar to Europe. In 1644, the population of Barbados was estimated at 30,000, of whom about 800 were of African ancestry, with the remainder mainly of English ancestry. These English smallholders were eventually bought out, and the island filled up with large sugar plantations worked by African slaves. By 1660 there was near parity, with 27,000 Black people and 26,000 White people. By 1666, at least 12,000 white smallholders had been bought out, died, or left the island, many choosing to emigrate to Jamaica or the American Colonies (notably the Carolinas). As a result, Barbados enacted a slave code as a way of legislatively controlling its enslaved Black population. The law's text was influential in laws in other colonies.

By 1680 there were 20,000 free whites and 46,000 enslaved Africans; by 1724, there were 18,000 free whites and 55,000 enslaved Africans.

=== 18th and 19th centuries ===
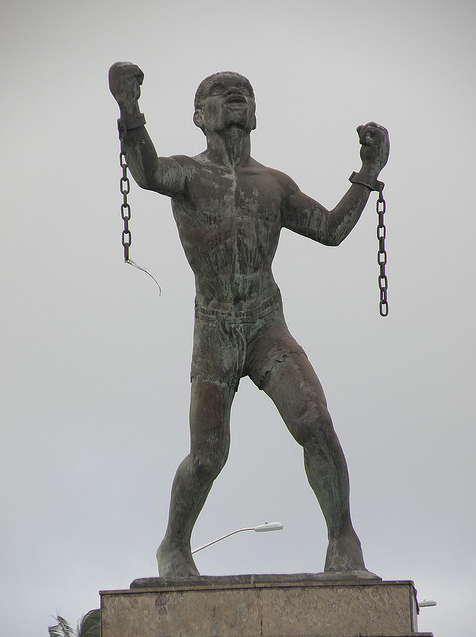
Statue of Bussa, Bridgetown. Bussa led the largest slave rebellion in Barbadian history.

The harsh conditions endured by the slaves resulted in several planned slave rebellions, the largest of which was Bussa's rebellion in 1816 which was rapidly suppressed by the colonial authorities. In 1819, another slave revolt broke out on Easter Day. The revolt was put down in blood, with heads being displayed on stakes. Nevertheless, the brutality of the repression shocked even England and strengthened the abolitionist movement. Growing opposition to slavery led to its abolition in the British Empire in 1833. The plantocracy class retained control of political and economic power on the island, with most workers living in relative poverty.

The 1780 hurricane killed more than 4,000 people on Barbados. In 1854, a cholera epidemic killed more than 20,000 inhabitants.

=== 20th century before independence ===
Deep dissatisfaction with the situation on Barbados led many to emigrate. Things came to a head in the 1930s during the Great Depression, as Barbadians began demanding better conditions for workers, the legalisation of trade unions and a widening of the franchise, which at that point was limited to male property owners. As a result of the increasing unrest the British sent a commission, called the West Indies Royal Commission, or Moyne Commission, in 1938, which recommended enacting many of the requested reforms on the islands. As a result, Afro-Barbadians began to play a much more prominent role in the colony's politics, with universal suffrage being introduced in 1950.

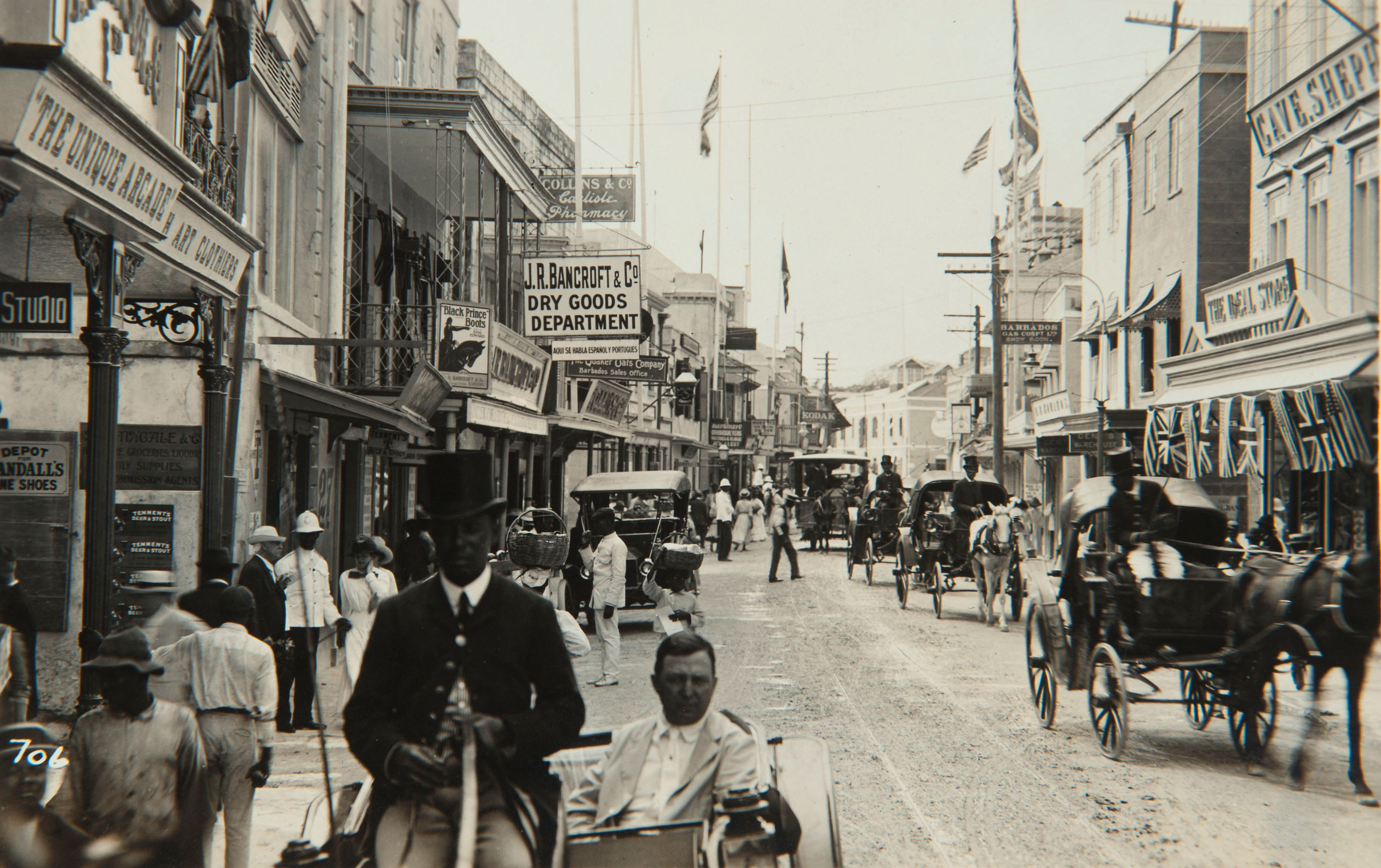
Broad Street, Bridgetown in 1914

Prominent among these early activists was Grantley Herbert Adams, who helped found the Barbados Labour Party (BLP) in 1938. He became the first Premier of Barbados in 1953, followed by fellow BLP-founder Hugh Gordon Cummins from 1958 to 1961. A group of left-leaning politicians who advocated swifter moves to independence broke off from the BLP and founded the Democratic Labour Party (DLP) in 1955. The DLP subsequently won the 1961 Barbadian general election, and their leader Errol Barrow became premier.

Full internal self-government was enacted in 1961. Barbados joined the short-lived British West Indies Federation from 1958 to 1962, later gaining full independence on 30 November 1966. Errol Barrow became the country's first prime minister.

Barbados opted to remain within the Commonwealth of Nations. Elizabeth II became Queen of Barbados and was represented locally by a governor-general..

=== Post-independence era ===
The Barrow government sought to diversify the economy away from agriculture, seeking to boost industry and the tourism sector. Barbados was also at the forefront of regional integration efforts, spearheading the creation of CARIFTA and CARICOM. The DLP lost the 1976 Barbadian general election to the BLP under Tom Adams. Adams adopted a more conservative and strongly pro-Western stance, allowing the Americans to use Barbados as the launchpad for their invasion of Grenada in 1983. Adams died in office in 1985 and was replaced by Harold Bernard St. John; however, St. John lost the 1986 Barbadian general election, which saw the return of the DLP under Errol Barrow, who had been highly critical of the US intervention in Grenada. Barrow, too, died in office, and was replaced by Lloyd Erskine Sandiford, who remained Prime Minister until 1994.

Owen Arthur of the BLP won the 1994 Barbadian general election, remaining prime minister until 2008. Arthur was a strong advocate of republicanism, though a planned referendum to replace Queen Elizabeth as Head of State in 2008 never took place. The DLP won the 2008 Barbadian general election, but the new Prime Minister David Thompson died in 2010 and was replaced by Freundel Stuart. The BLP returned to power in 2018 under Mia Mottley, who became Barbados's first female prime minister.

==== Transition to republic ====
The Government of Barbados announced on 15 September 2020 that it intended to become a republic by 30 November 2021, the 55th anniversary of its independence, resulting in the replacement of the Barbadian monarchy with a president elected through an electoral college. Barbados would then cease to be a Commonwealth realm, but could maintain membership in the Commonwealth of Nations, like Guyana and Trinidad and Tobago.

On 20 September 2021, just over a full year after the announcement for the transition was made, the Constitution (Amendment) (No. 2) Bill, 2021 was introduced in the Parliament of Barbados. Passed on 6 October, the Bill made amendments to the Constitution of Barbados, introducing the office of the president of Barbados to replace the role of Elizabeth II as Queen of Barbados. The following week, on 12 October 2021, incumbent Governor-General of Barbados Sandra Mason was jointly nominated by the Prime Minister and the Leader of the Opposition as candidate to be the first president of Barbados, and was subsequently elected on 20 October. Mason took office on 30 November 2021. Prince Charles, the heir apparent to the Barbadian Crown at the time, attended the swearing-in ceremony in Bridgetown at the invitation of the Government of Barbados.

Queen Elizabeth sent a message of congratulations to President Mason and the people of Barbados, saying: "As you celebrate this momentous day, I send you and all Barbadians my warmest good wishes for your happiness, peace and prosperity in the future."

A survey that was conducted between 23 October 2021 and 10 November 2021, by the University of the West Indies showed 34% of respondents being in favour of transitioning to a republic, while 30% were indifferent. Notably, no overall majority was found in the survey; with 24% not indicating a preference and the remaining 12% being opposed to the removal of Queen Elizabeth.

On 20 June 2022, a Constitutional Review Commission was formed and sworn in by Jeffrey Gibson (who at the time was serving temporarily as Acting President of Barbados) to review the Constitution of Barbados.

The commission was given a 15-month timeline to complete its work, which included consulting the public about the new republic and drafting a constitution. Thus, the CRC engaged the public in a number of public meetings, lectures, and Twitter Spaces. The report was announced delayed by August 2023, with the final report submitted 30 June 2024.

In February 2026, prime minister Mia Mottley won her third consecutive election victory by landslide, meaning her Barbados Labour party won again all the 30 seats in the House of Assembly.

== Geography ==
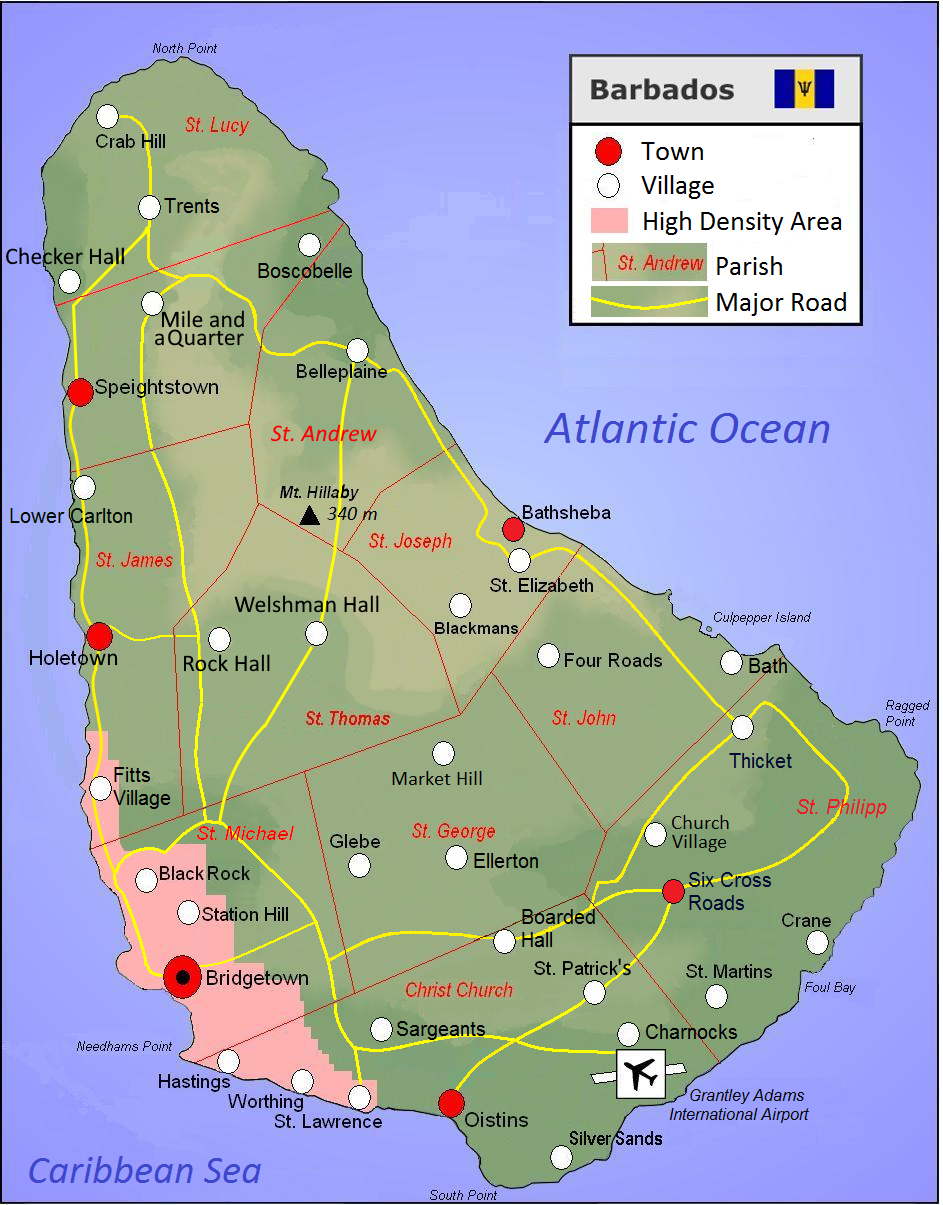
Map of Barbados

Barbados is situated in the Atlantic Ocean, east of the other West Indies Islands. Barbados is the easternmost island in the Lesser Antilles in the southern Caribbean area. It is 21 miles (34 kilometres) long and up to 23 km (14 mi) wide, covering an area of 439 km^{2} (169 sq mi). It lies about 168 km (104 mi) east of both the countries of Saint Lucia and Saint Vincent and the Grenadines; 180 km (110 mi) south-east of Martinique and 400 km (250 mi) north-east of Trinidad and Tobago. It is flat in comparison to its island neighbours to the west, the Windward Islands. The island rises gently to the central highland region known as Scotland District, with the highest point being Mount Hillaby 340 m (1,120 ft) above sea level.

In Barbados, forest cover is around 15% of the total land area, equivalent to 6,300 hectares (ha) of forest in 2020, which was unchanged from 1990. In 2020, naturally regenerating forest covered 6,300 hectares (ha) and planted forest covered 0 hectares (ha). Of the naturally regenerating forest 0% was reported to be primary forest (consisting of native tree species with no clearly visible indications of human activity) and around 5% of the forest area was found within protected areas. For the year 2015, 1% of the forest area was reported to be under public ownership, 0% private ownership and 99% with ownership listed as other or unknown.

In the parish of Saint Michael lies Barbados's capital and main city, Bridgetown, containing one third of the country's population. Other major towns scattered across the island include Holetown, in the parish of Saint James; Oistins, in the parish of Christ Church; and Speightstown, in the parish of Saint Peter.

Barbados lies at latitude 13° N and longitude 59° W. The population tends to be concentrated around the southwest coast, with the interior more sparsely populated, due to the presence of the agrarian focused socio-economic model during the colonial period attributed to sugar cane harvesting and plantation system dominant on the island.

=== Geology ===
Barbados lies on the boundary of the South American and the Caribbean Plates. The subduction of the South American Plate beneath the Caribbean Plate scrapes sediment from the South American Plate and deposits it above the subduction zone forming an accretionary prism. The rate of this depositing of material allows Barbados to rise at a rate of about 25 mm (1 in) per 1,000 years. This subduction means geologically the island is composed of coral roughly 90 m (300 ft) thick, where reefs formed above the sediment. The land slopes in a series of "terraces" in the west and goes into an incline in the east. A large proportion of the island is circled by coral reefs.

The erosion of limestone in the northeast of the island, in the Scotland District, has resulted in the formation of various caves and gullies. On the Atlantic east coast of the island coastal landforms, including stacks, have been created due to the limestone composition of the area. Also notable in the island is the rocky cape known as Pico Teneriffe or Pico de Tenerife, which is named after the fact that the island of Tenerife in Spain is the first land east of Barbados according to the belief of the locals.

=== Climate ===
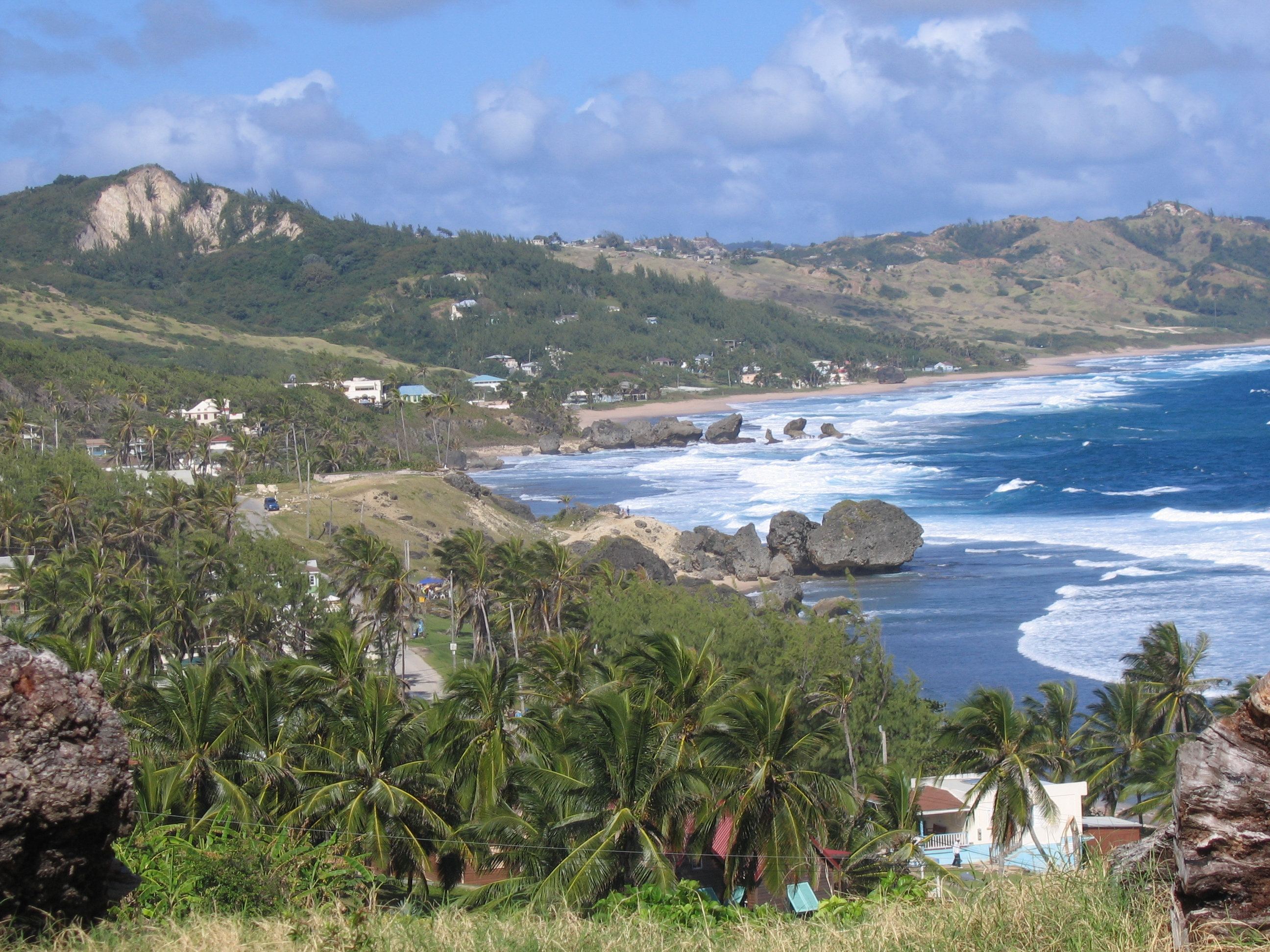
Bathsheba, Saint Joseph

The country generally experiences two seasons, one of which includes noticeably higher rainfall. Known as the "wet season", this period runs from June to December. By contrast, the "dry season" runs from December to May. Annual precipitation ranges between 1,000 and 2,300 mm (40 and 90 in). From December to May the average temperatures range from 21 to 31 °C (70 to 88 °F), while between June and November, they range from 23 to 31 °C (73 to 88 °F).

On the Köppen climate classification scale, much of Barbados is regarded as a tropical monsoon climate (Am). However, breezes of 12 to 16 km/h (7 to 10 mph) abound throughout the year and give Barbados a climate which is moderately tropical.

Infrequent natural hazards include earthquakes, landslips, and hurricanes. Barbados lies outside the Main Development Region for tropical cyclone activity in the Atlantic, and is often spared the worst effects of the region's storms during the rainy season. On average, a major hurricane makes landfall in Barbados about once every 26 years. The last significant hit from a hurricane to cause severe damage to Barbados was Hurricane Janet in 1955; in 2010 the island was struck by Hurricane Tomas, but this caused only minor damage across the country as it was only at Tropical Storm strength at the time of impact.

=== Environmental issues ===
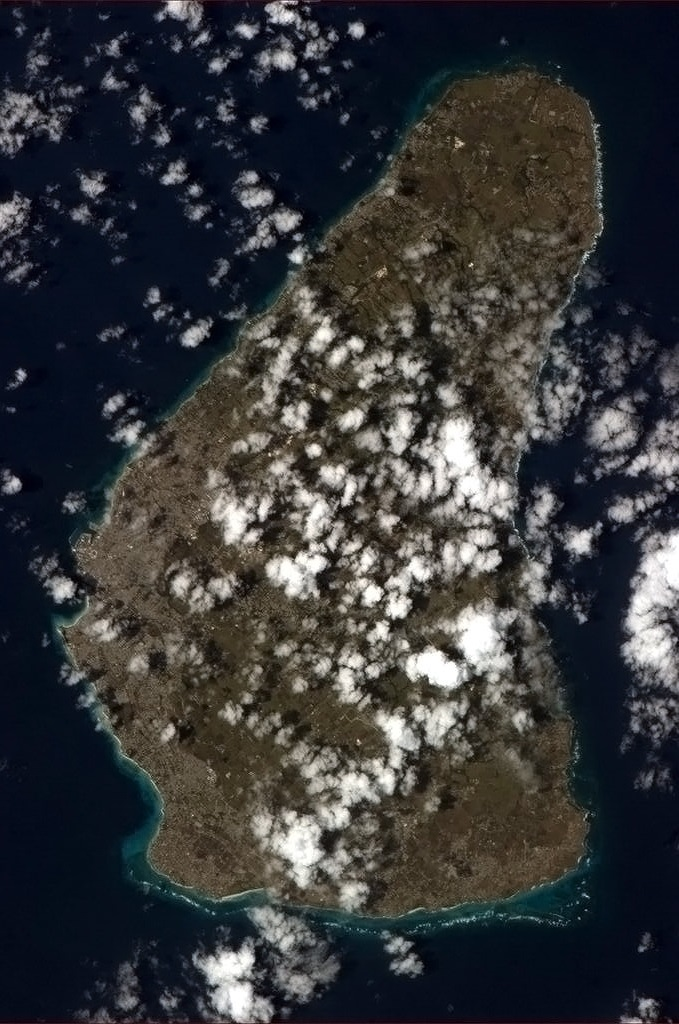
Barbados, seen from the International Space Station

Barbados is susceptible to environmental pressures. As one of the world's most densely populated isles, the government worked during the 1990s to aggressively integrate the growing south coast of the island into the Bridgetown Sewage Treatment Plant to reduce contamination of offshore coral reefs. As of the first decade of the 21st century, a second treatment plant has been proposed along the island's west coast. Being so densely populated, Barbados has made great efforts to protect its underground aquifers.

As a coral-limestone island, Barbados is highly permeable to seepage of surface water into the earth. The government has placed great emphasis on protecting the catchment areas that lead directly into the huge network of underground aquifers and streams. On occasion illegal squatters have breached these areas, and the government has removed squatters to preserve the cleanliness of the underground springs which provide the island's drinking water.

The government has placed a huge emphasis on keeping Barbados clean with the aim of protecting the environment and preserving offshore coral reefs which surround the island. Many initiatives to mitigate human pressures on the coastal regions of Barbados and seas come from the Coastal Zone Management Unit (CZMU). Barbados has nearly 56 miles (90 kilometres) of coral reefs just offshore and two protected marine parks have been established off the west coast. Overfishing is another threat which faces Barbados.

Although on the opposite side of the Atlantic, and some 3,000 miles (4,800 kilometres) west of Africa, Barbados is one of many places in the American continent that experience heightened levels of mineral dust from the Sahara Desert. Some particularly intense dust episodes have been blamed partly for the impacts on the health of coral reefs surrounding Barbados or asthmatic episodes, but evidence has not wholly supported the former claim.

Access to biocapacity in Barbados is much lower than world average. In 2016, Barbados had 0.17 global hectares of biocapacity per person within its territory, much less than the world average of 1.6 global hectares per person. In 2016 Barbados used 0.84 global hectares of biocapacity per person - their ecological footprint of consumption. This means they use approximately five times as much biocapacity as Barbados contains. As a result, Barbados is running a biocapacity deficit.

=== Wildlife ===
Barbados is host to four species of nesting turtles (green turtles, loggerheads, hawksbill turtles, and leatherbacks) and has the second-largest hawksbill turtle-breeding population in the Caribbean. The driving of vehicles on beaches can crush nests buried in the sand and such activity is discouraged in nesting areas.

Barbados is also the host to the green monkey. The green monkey is found in West Africa from Senegal to the Volta River. It has been introduced to the Cape Verde islands off north-western Africa, and the West Indian islands of Saint Kitts, Nevis, Saint Martin, and Barbados. It was introduced to the West Indies in the late 17th century when slave trade ships travelled to the Caribbean from West Africa. The green monkey is considered a very curious and mischievous/troublesome animal by locals.

== Government and politics ==
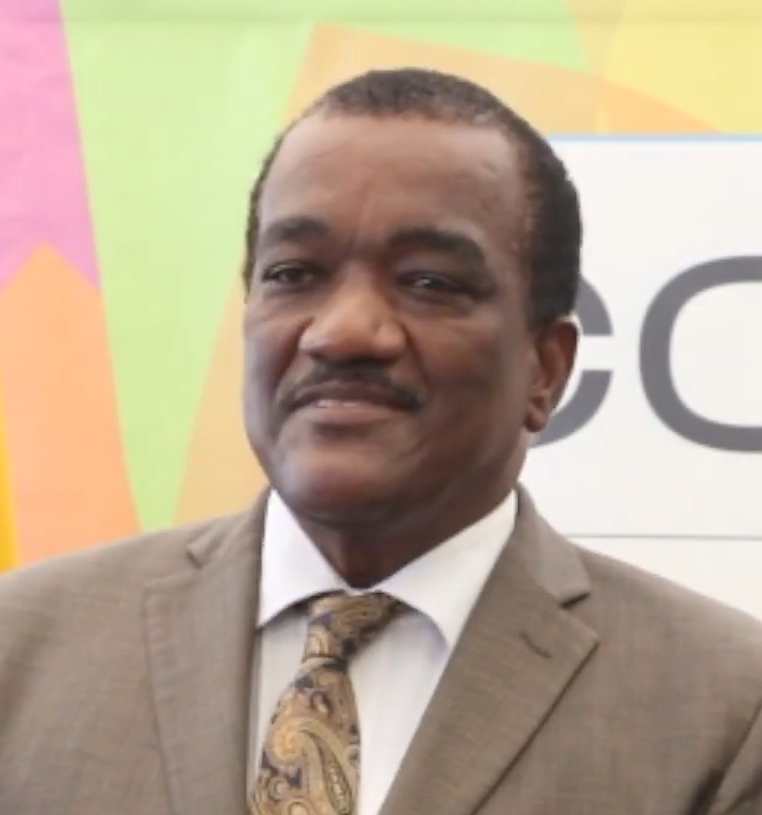
Jeffrey Bostic
President

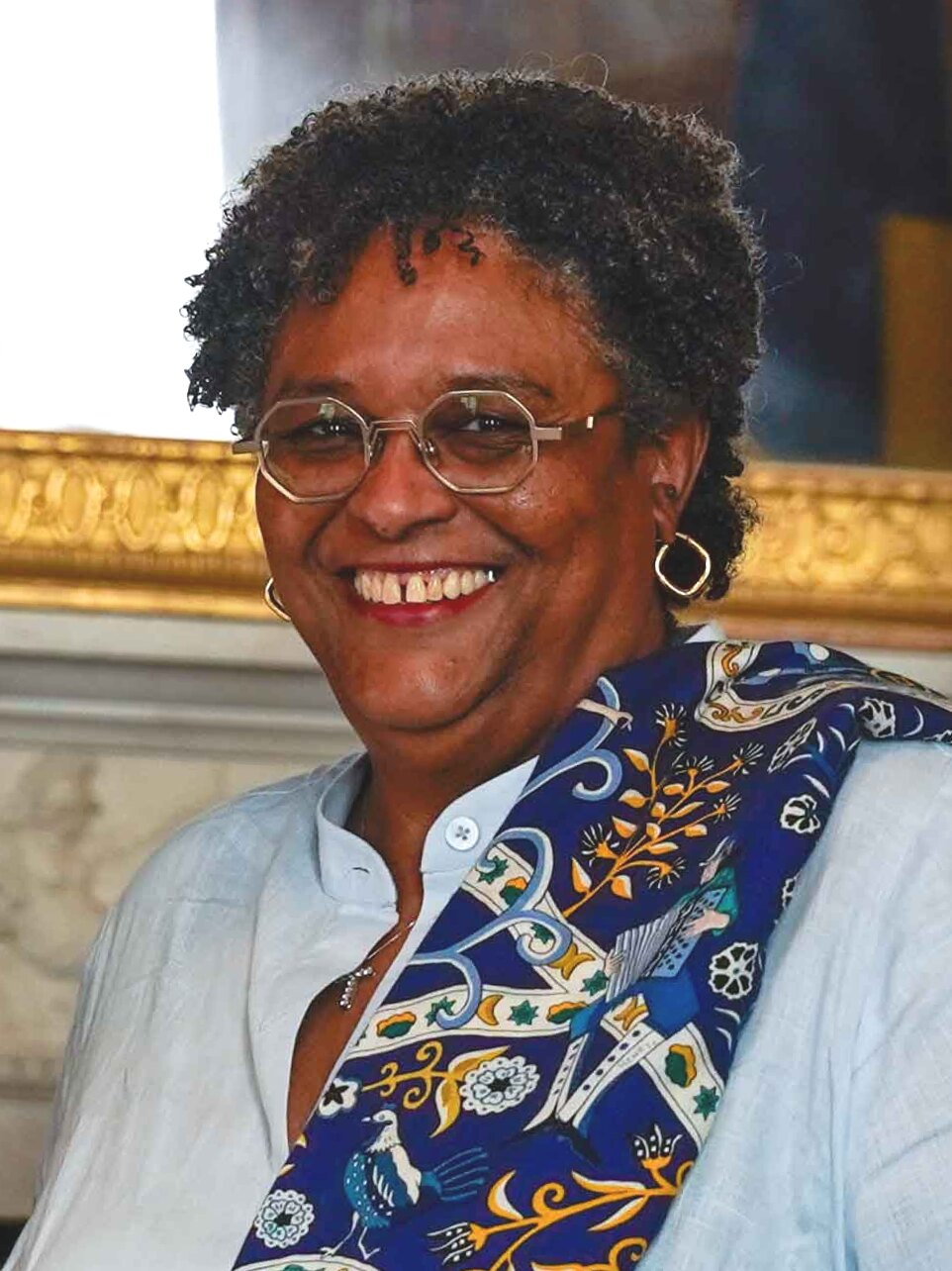
Mia Mottley
Prime Minister

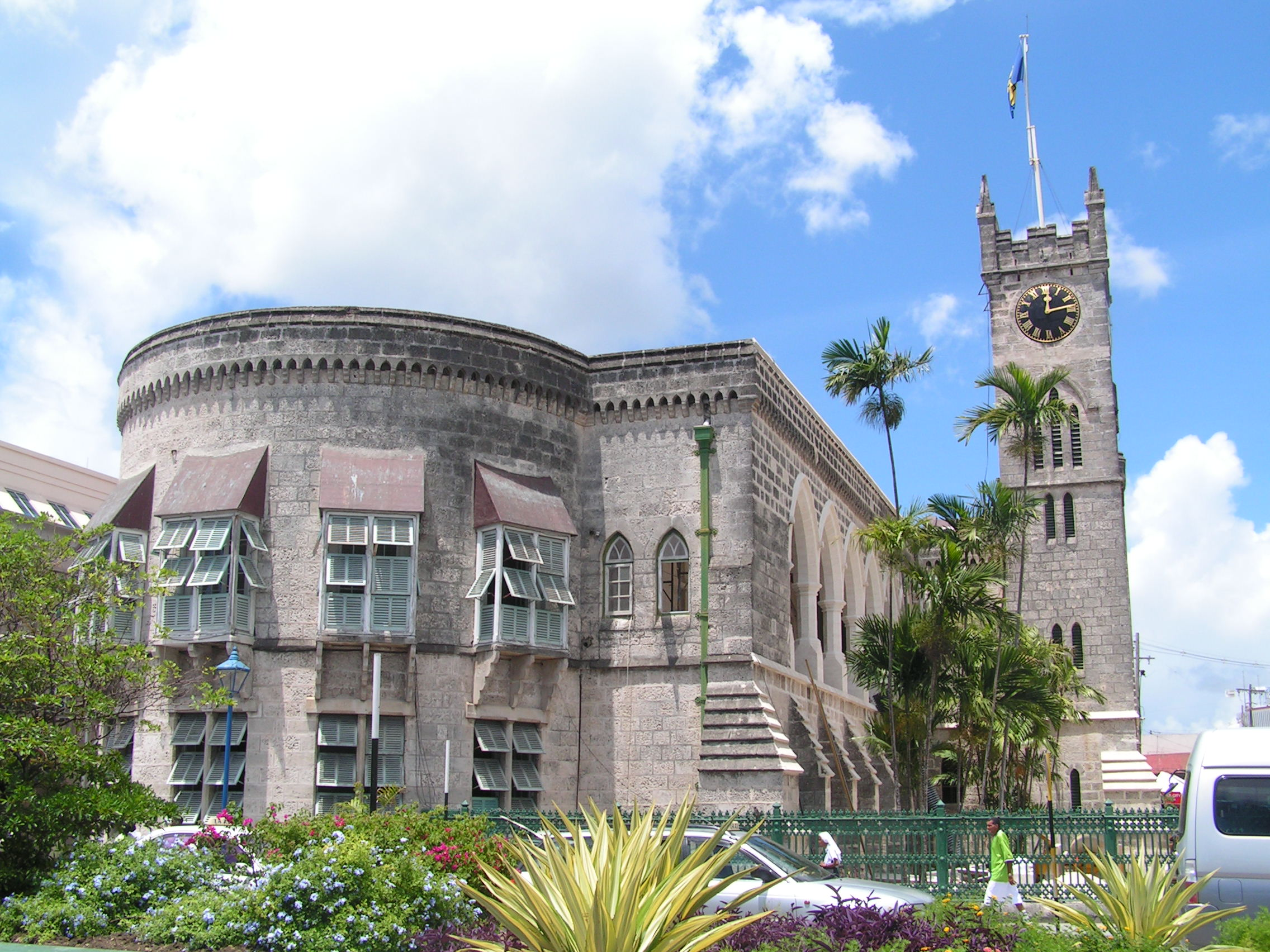
The Barbados parliament building in Bridgetown

Barbados has been an independent country since 30 November 1966. It functions as a parliamentary republic modelled on the British Westminster system. The head of state is the President of Barbados – presently Jeffrey Bostic – elected by the Parliament of Barbados for a term of four years, and advised on matters of the Barbadian state by the Prime Minister of Barbados, who is head of government. There are 30 representatives within the House of Assembly, the lower chamber of Parliament. In the Senate, the upper chamber of Parliament, there are 21 senators.

The Constitution of Barbados is the supreme law of the country. Legislation is passed by the Parliament of Barbados but does not have the force of law unless the President grants their assent to that law. The right to withhold assent is absolute and cannot be overridden by Parliament. The Attorney General is the principal legal adviser to the government (according to s.72(1) of the Constitution. The independent judiciary, known as the Judicature, is established by s79C of the Constitution.

During the 1990s, at the suggestion of Trinidad and Tobago's Patrick Manning, Barbados attempted a political union with Trinidad and Tobago and Guyana. The project stalled after the then prime minister of Barbados, Lloyd Erskine Sandiford, became ill and his Democratic Labour Party lost the next general election. Barbados continues to share close ties with Trinidad and Tobago and with Guyana, claiming the highest number of Guyanese immigrants after the United States, Canada and the United Kingdom.

Barbados is a party to the Rome Statute of the International Criminal Court.

According to International IDEA's Global State of Democracy (GSoD) Indices and Democracy Tracker, Barbados performs in the mid to high range on overall democratic measures, with particular strengths in gender equality, inclusive suffrage, and freedom of expression.

=== Political culture ===
Barbados functions as a two-party system. The dominant political parties are the Democratic Labour Party and the incumbent Barbados Labour Party. Since independence on 30 November 1966, the Democratic Labour Party (DLP) has governed from 1966 to 1976; 1986 to 1994; and from 2008 to 2018; and the Barbados Labour Party (BLP) has governed from 1976 to 1986; 1994 to 2008; and from 2018 to present.

=== Administrative divisions ===
Barbados is divided into 11 parishes:

1. Christ Church
2. Saint Andrew
3. Saint George
4. Saint James
5. Saint John
6. Saint Joseph
7. Saint Lucy
8. Saint Michael
9. Saint Peter
10. Saint Philip
11. Saint Thomas

=== Foreign relations ===
Barbados follows a policy of nonalignment and seeks cooperative relations with all friendly states. Barbados is a full and participating member of the Caribbean Community (CARICOM), CARICOM Single Market and Economy (CSME), the Association of Caribbean States (ACS), the Organization of American States (OAS), the Commonwealth of Nations, and the Caribbean Court of Justice (CCJ). In 2005, Barbados replaced the Judicial Committee of the Privy Council with the Caribbean Court of Justice as its final court of appeal.

Barbados has been a member of the Forum of Small States (FOSS) since the group's founding in 1992.

==== World Trade Organization, European Commission, CARIFORUM ====
Barbados is an original member (1995) of the World Trade Organization (WTO) and participates actively in its work. It grants at least MFN treatment to all its trading partners. European Union relations and cooperation with Barbados are carried out both on a bilateral and a regional basis. Barbados is party to the Cotonou Agreement, through which, As of December 2007, it is linked by an Economic Partnership Agreement with the European Commission. The pact involves the Caribbean Forum (CARIFORUM) subgroup of the African, Caribbean and Pacific Group of States (ACP). CARIFORUM is the only part of the wider ACP-bloc that has concluded the full regional trade-pact with the European Union. There are also ongoing EU-Community of Latin American and Caribbean States (CELAC) and EU-CARIFORUM dialogues.

Trade policy has also sought to protect a small number of domestic activities, mostly food production, from foreign competition, while recognising that most domestic needs are best met by imports.

=== Military and law enforcement ===
The Barbados Defence Force has roughly 800 members. Within it, service members aged 14 to 18 years make up the Barbados Cadet Corps. The defence preparations of the island nation are closely tied to defence treaties with the United Kingdom, the United States, the People's Republic of China, and other eastern Caribbean countries.

The Barbados Police Service is the sole law enforcement agency on the island of Barbados.

== Economy ==
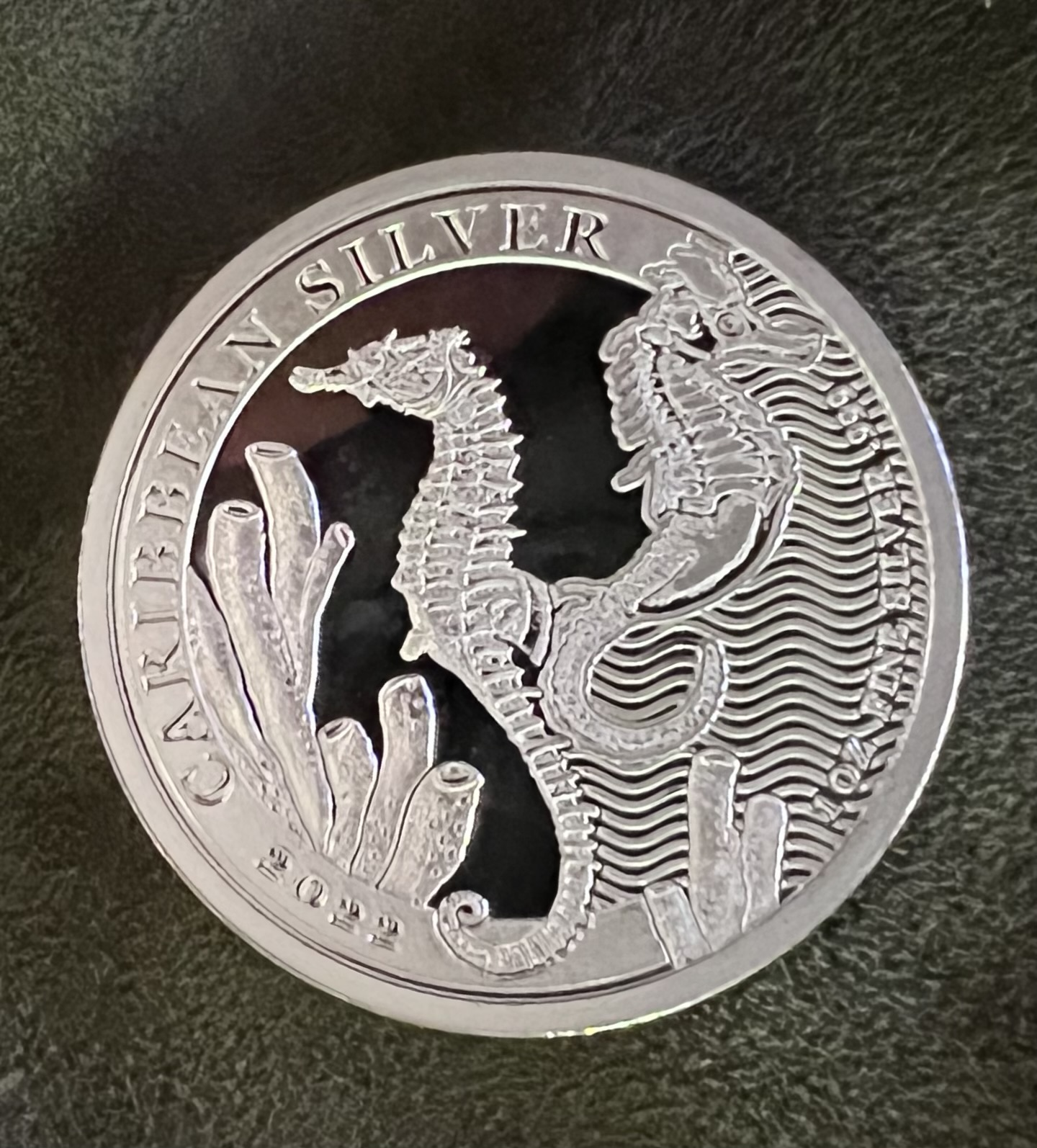
1 oz Silver Caribbean Seahorse – Sovereign coin backed by the Barbados government

Barbados is the 52nd richest country in the world in terms of GDP (Gross Domestic Product) per capita, with a well-developed mixed economy and a moderately high standard of living. According to the World Bank, Barbados is one of 83 high income economies in the world. Despite this, a 2012 self-study in conjunction with the Caribbean Development Bank revealed that 20% of Barbadians live in poverty and nearly 10% cannot meet their basic daily food needs. Barbados was ranked 77th in the Global Innovation Index in 2024, but its ranking dropped to the 84th rank in 2025.

Historically, the economy of Barbados was dependent on sugarcane cultivation and related activities, but since the late 1970s and early 1980s it has diversified into the manufacturing and tourism sectors. Offshore finance and information services have become important foreign exchange earners.

Partly due to the staging of the 2007 Cricket World Cup, the island saw a construction boom, with the development and redevelopment of hotels, office complexes, and homes. This slowed during the 2008 to 2012 world economic crisis and the recession.

The economy was strong between 1999 and 2000 but entered a recession in 2001 and 2002 due to decreases in tourism and consumer spending and the impact of the 11 September 2001 attacks in the United States and the 7 July 2005 London bombings in the United Kingdom. The economy rebounded in 2003 and grew from 2004 to 2008. The economy went into recession again from 2008 to 2013 before growing from 2014 to 2017. Then it declined to another recession from 2017 to 2019 during the world economic crisis. There were 23 downgrades by both Standard & Poor's and Moody's in 2016, 2017 and 2018. The economy showed signs of recovery with 3 upgrades from Standard and Poor's and Moody's in 2019. From 1 January to 31 March 2020 the economy had started to grow, but then it experienced another decline due to the COVID-19 economic recession.

Barbados also has one of the Caribbean's most highly ranked passports, with Barbadian citizens enjoying visa-free or simplified access to more than 100 destinations worldwide.

Traditional trading partners include Canada, the Caribbean Community (especially Trinidad and Tobago), the United Kingdom, and the United States. Recent government administrations have continued efforts to reduce unemployment, encourage foreign direct investment, and privatise remaining state-owned enterprises. Unemployment dropped to 10.7% in 2003. However, it has since increased to 11.9% in second quarter, 2015.

The European Union is assisting Barbados with a €10 million program of modernisation of the country's International Business and Financial Services Sector.

Barbados maintains the third largest stock exchange in the Caribbean region. As of 2009, officials at the stock exchange were investigating the possibility of augmenting the local exchange with an International Securities Market (ISM) venture.

=== Sovereign default and restructuring ===
By May 2018, Barbados's outstanding debt had climbed to US$7.5 billion, more than 1.7 times the country's GDP. In June 2018 the government defaulted on its sovereign debt when it failed to make a coupon on Eurobonds maturing in 2035. Outstanding bond debt of Barbados reached US$4.4 billion.

In October 2019, Barbados concluded restructuring negotiations with a creditor group including investments funds Eaton Vance Management, Greylock Capital Management, Teachers Advisors, and Guyana Bank for Trade and Industry. Creditors will exchange existing bonds for a new debt series maturing in 2029. The new bonds involve a principal "haircut" of approximately 26% and include a clause allowing for deferment of principal and capitalisation of interest in the event of a natural disaster.

=== Transport ===
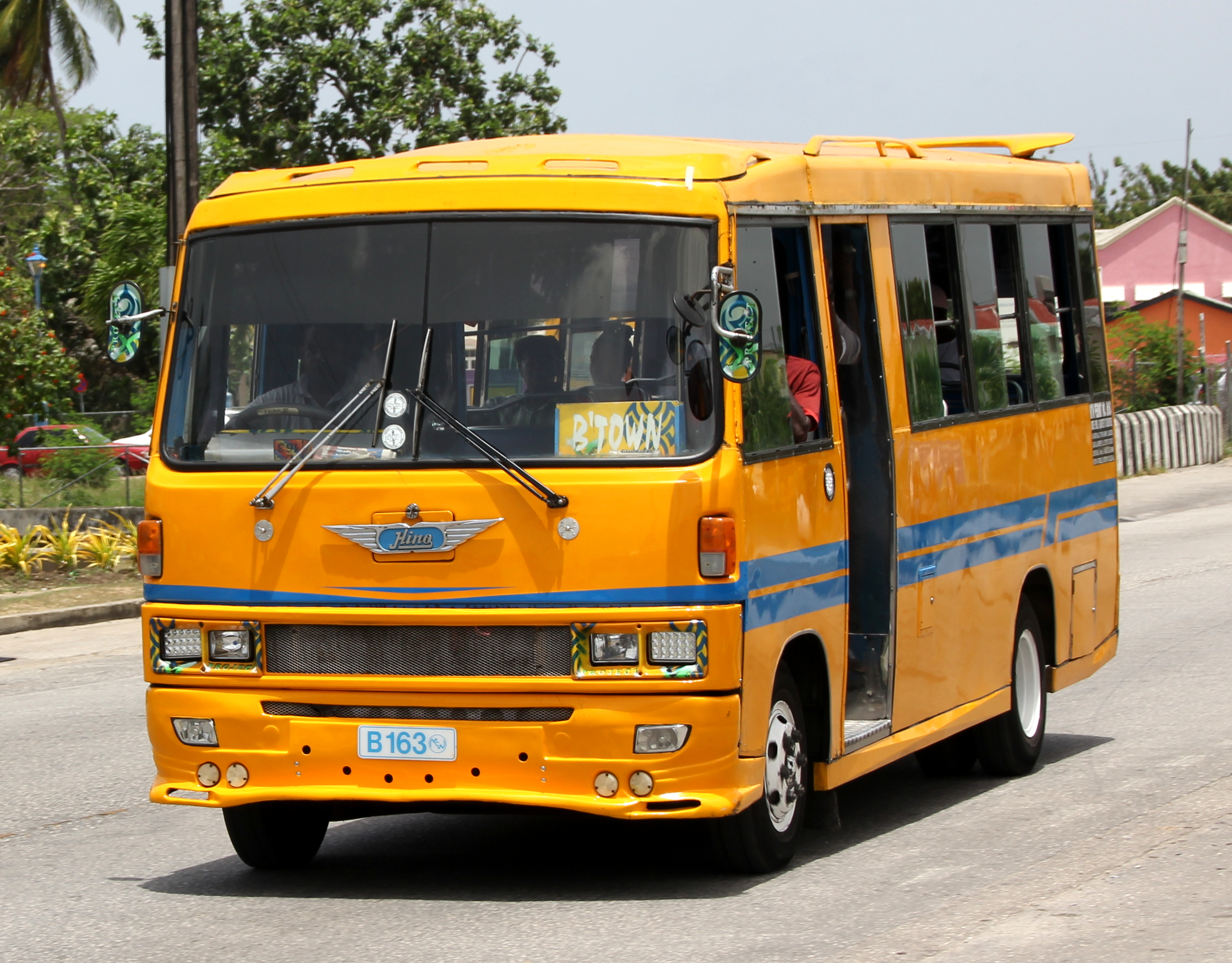
A Hino ACME Minibus B 163 in Speightstown, St. Peter, Barbados

Although Barbados is about 34 km (21 mi) across at its widest point, a car journey from Six Cross Roads in St. Philip (south-east) to North Point in St. Lucy (north-central) can take one and a half hours or longer due to traffic. Barbados has half as many registered cars as citizens. In Barbados, drivers drive on the left side of the road.

Barbados is known for its many roundabouts. One famous roundabout is located east of Bridgetown and holds the Emancipation Statue of the slave Bussa.

Transport on the island is relatively convenient with "route taxis" called "ZRs" (pronounced "Zed-Rs") travelling to most points on the island. These small buses can at times be crowded, as passengers are generally never turned down regardless of the number. They will usually take the more scenic routes to destinations. They generally depart from the capital Bridgetown or from Speightstown in the northern part of the island.

Including the ZRs, there are three bus systems running seven days a week (though less frequently on Sundays). There are ZRs, the yellow minibuses and the blue Transport Board buses. A ride on any of them costs Bds$ 3.5. The smaller buses from the two privately owned systems ("ZRs" and "minibuses") can give change; the larger blue buses from the government-operated Barbados Transport Board system cannot, but do give receipts. The Barbados Transport Board buses travel in regular bus routes and scheduled timetables across Barbados. Schoolchildren in school uniform including some Secondary schools ride for free on the government buses and for Bds$ 2.5 on the ZRs. Most routes require a connection in Bridgetown. Barbados Transport Board's headquarters are located at Kay's House, Roebuck Street, St. Michael, and the bus depots and terminals are located in the Fairchild Street Bus Terminal in Fairchild Street and the Princess Alice Bus Terminal (which was formerly the Lower Green Bus Terminal in Jubilee Gardens, Bridgetown, St. Michael) in Princess Alice Highway, Bridgetown, St. Michael; the Speightstown Bus Terminal in Speightstown, St. Peter; the Oistins Bus Depot in Oistins, Christ Church; and the Mangrove Bus Depot in Mangrove, St. Philip. In July 2020, the Barbados Transport Board received 33 BYD electric buses which were obtained not only to add to the ageing fleet of diesel buses but also to assist the Government in their goal of eliminating the use of fossil fuels by 2030.

Some hotels also provide visitors with shuttles to points of interest on the island from outside the hotel lobby. There are several locally owned and operated vehicle rental agencies in Barbados but there are no multi-national companies.

The island's lone airport is the Grantley Adams International Airport. It receives daily flights by several major airlines from points around the globe, as well as several smaller regional commercial airlines and charters. The airport serves as a southern air-transportation hub for the Caribbean. It underwent a US$100 million upgrade and expansion from 2003 to 2006. In 2023, it began conversion of its former Concorde terminal and museum to a new departure terminal, and in December 2023, Prime Minister Mia Mottley announced the negotiations for a US$300 million for additional airport development.

The Bridgetown seaport is the primary port of call for commercial container and cruise traffic. Maritime traffic is managed by the Barbados Port Inc., formally Barbados Port Authority.

Until 2009, when Bajan Helicopter closed their doors, they offered helicopter shuttle services. Air traffic is managed by the Barbados Civil Aviation Department.

== Demographics ==
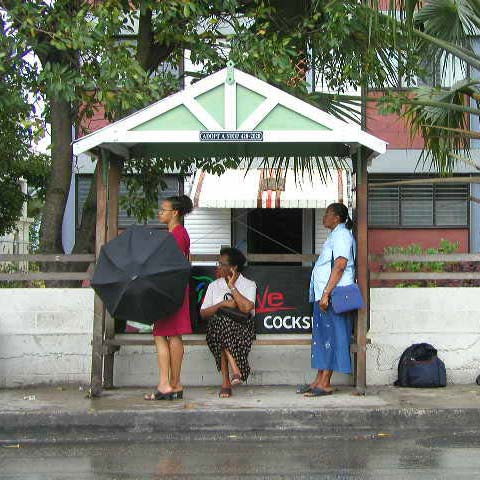
A bus stop in Barbados

The 2010 national census conducted by the Barbados Statistical Service reported a resident population of 277,821, of whom 144,803 were female and 133,018 were male.

The life expectancy for Barbados residents as of 2020 is 80 years. The average life expectancy is 83 years for females and 79 years for males (2020). Barbados and Japan have the highest per capita occurrences of centenarians in the world.

The crude birth rate is 12.23 births per 1,000 people, and the crude death rate is 8.39 deaths per 1,000 people. The infant mortality rate was 11.057 infant deaths per 1,000 live births in 2021, according to UNICEF.

=== Ethnicity ===
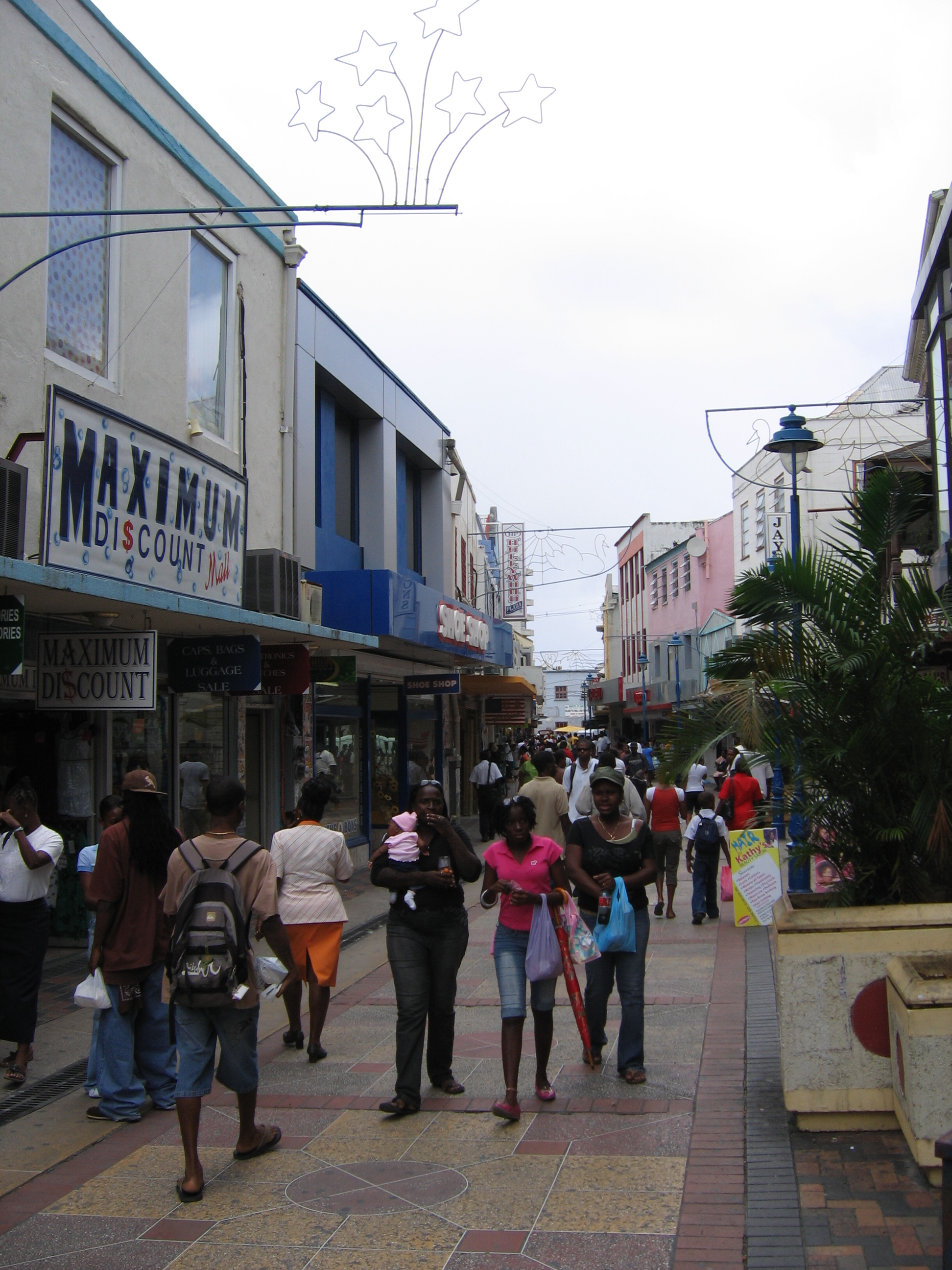
People shopping in the capital Bridgetown

Close to 90% of all Barbadians (also known colloquially as "Bajan") are of Afro-Caribbean ancestry ("Afro-Bajans") and mixed ancestry. The remainder of the population includes groups of Europeans ("Anglo-Bajans" / "Euro-Bajans") mainly from the United Kingdom, Portugal, Ireland, Germany, and Italy. Other European groups consisted of the French, Austrians, Spaniards, and Russians. Asians, predominantly from Hong Kong and India (both Hindu and Muslim) make up less than 1% of the population. Other groups in Barbados include people from the United States and Canada. Barbadians who return after years of residence in the United States and children born in the United States to Bajan parents are called "Bajan Yankees", a term considered derogatory by some. Generally, Bajans recognise and accept all "children of the island" as Bajans, and refer to each other as such.

The biggest communities outside the Afro-Caribbean community are:

1. The Indo-Guyanese, an important part of the economy due to the increase of immigrants from partner country Guyana. There are reports of a growing Indo-Bajans diaspora originating from Guyana and India starting around 1990. Predominantly from southern India, they are growing in size but are smaller than the equivalent communities in Trinidad and Guyana. The Muslim Barbadians of Indian origin are largely of Gujarati ancestry. Many small businesses in Barbados are run and operated by Muslim-Indian Bajans.
2. Euro-Bajans (5% of the population) have settled in Barbados since the 17th century, originating from England, Ireland, Portugal, and Scotland. In 1643, there were 37,200 whites in Barbados (86% of the population). More commonly they are known as "White Bajans". Euro-Bajans introduced folk music, such as Irish music and Highland music, and certain place names, such as "Scotland District", a hilly region in the parish of St. Andrew. Among White Barbadians there exists an underclass known as Redlegs comprising followers of the Duke of Monmouth after his defeat at the Battle of Sedgemoor, as well as the descendants of Irish indentured labourers and prisoners imported to the island. Many additionally moved on to become the earliest settlers of modern-day North and South Carolina in the United States. Today the Redlegs number only around 400.
3. Chinese-Barbadians are a small portion of Barbados's wider Asian population. Chinese food and culture is becoming part of everyday Bajan culture.
4. Lebanese and Syrians form the island's Arab Barbadian community.
5. Jews arrived in Barbados just after the first settlers in 1627. Bridgetown is the home of Nidhe Israel Synagogue, one of the oldest Jewish synagogues in the Americas, dating from 1654, though the current structure was erected in 1833, replacing one ruined by the hurricane of 1831. Tombstones in the neighbouring cemetery date from the 1630s. Now under the care of the Barbados National Trust, the site was deserted in 1929 but was saved and restored by the Jewish community beginning in 1986.
6. In the 17th century, Romani people were sent from the United Kingdom to work as slaves in the plantations in Barbados.

=== Languages ===
English is the official language of Barbados, and is used for communications, administration, and public services all over the island. In its capacity as the official language of the country, the standard of English tends to conform to vocabulary, pronunciations, spellings, and conventions akin to, but not exactly the same as, those of British English. For most Barbadians, however, Bajan Creole is the language of everyday life, despite remaining primarily oral and lacking a standardised written form.

=== Religion ===
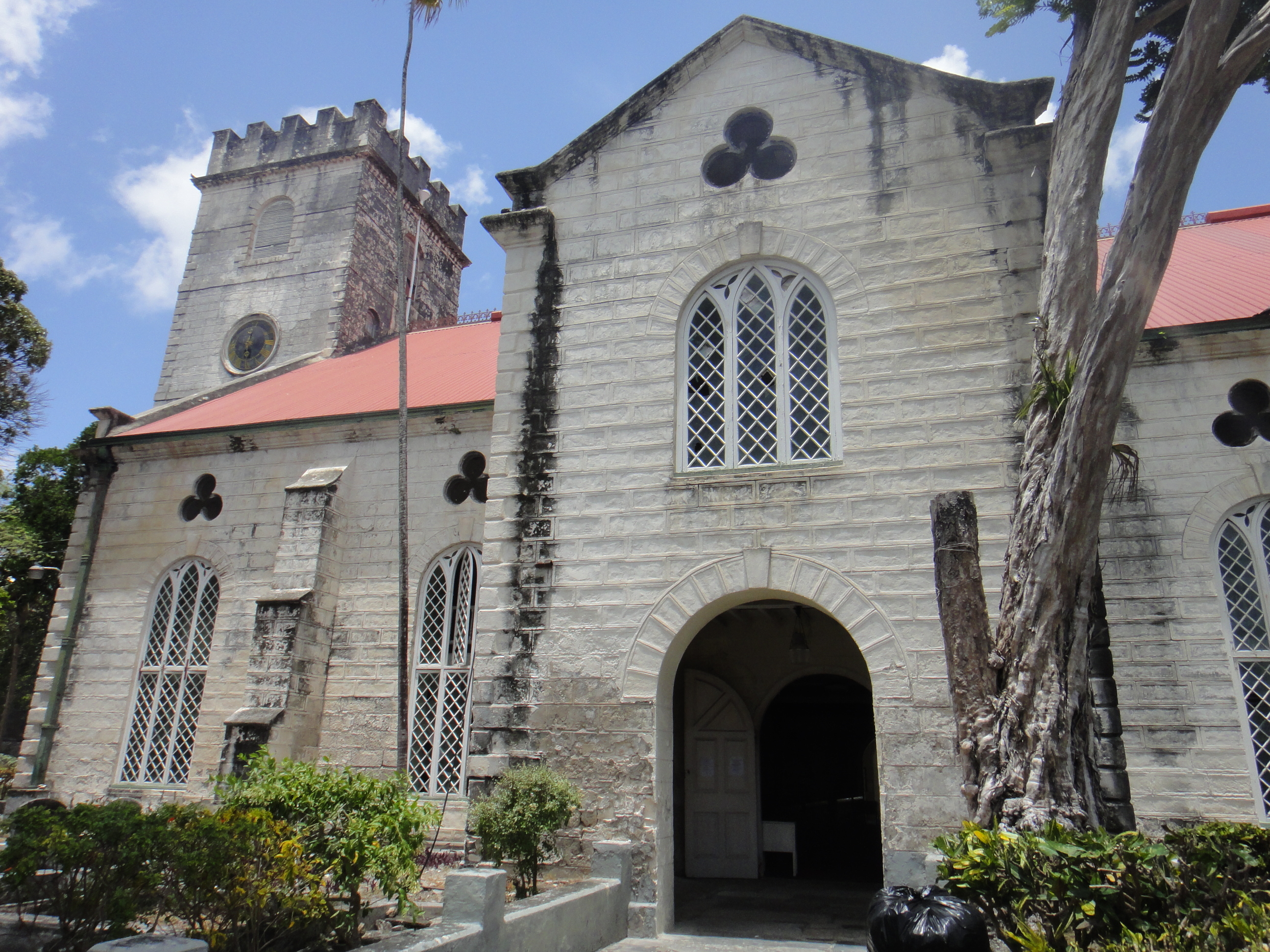
Cathedral Church of Saint Michael and All Angels, Bridgetown

Christianity is the largest religion in Barbados, with the largest denomination being Anglican (23.9% of the population in 2019). Other Christian denominations with significant followings in Barbados are the Catholic Church (administered by Roman Catholic Diocese of Bridgetown), Pentecostals (19.5%), Jehovah's Witnesses, the Seventh-day Adventist Church and Spiritual Baptists. The Church of England was the official state religion until its legal disestablishment by the Parliament of Barbados following independence. As of 2019, 21% of Barbadians report having no religion, making the non-religious the second largest group after Anglicans. Smaller religions in Barbados include Islam, Hinduism, the Baháʼí Faith, Rastafarism and Judaism.

The state is considered secular, guaranteeing freedom of religion or belief to all and featuring only symbolic allusions to a higher power in the preamble to the constitution. Nearly half (45.5%) of all Barbadians reported no religious affiliation whatsoever in the 2021 Census.

=== Education ===
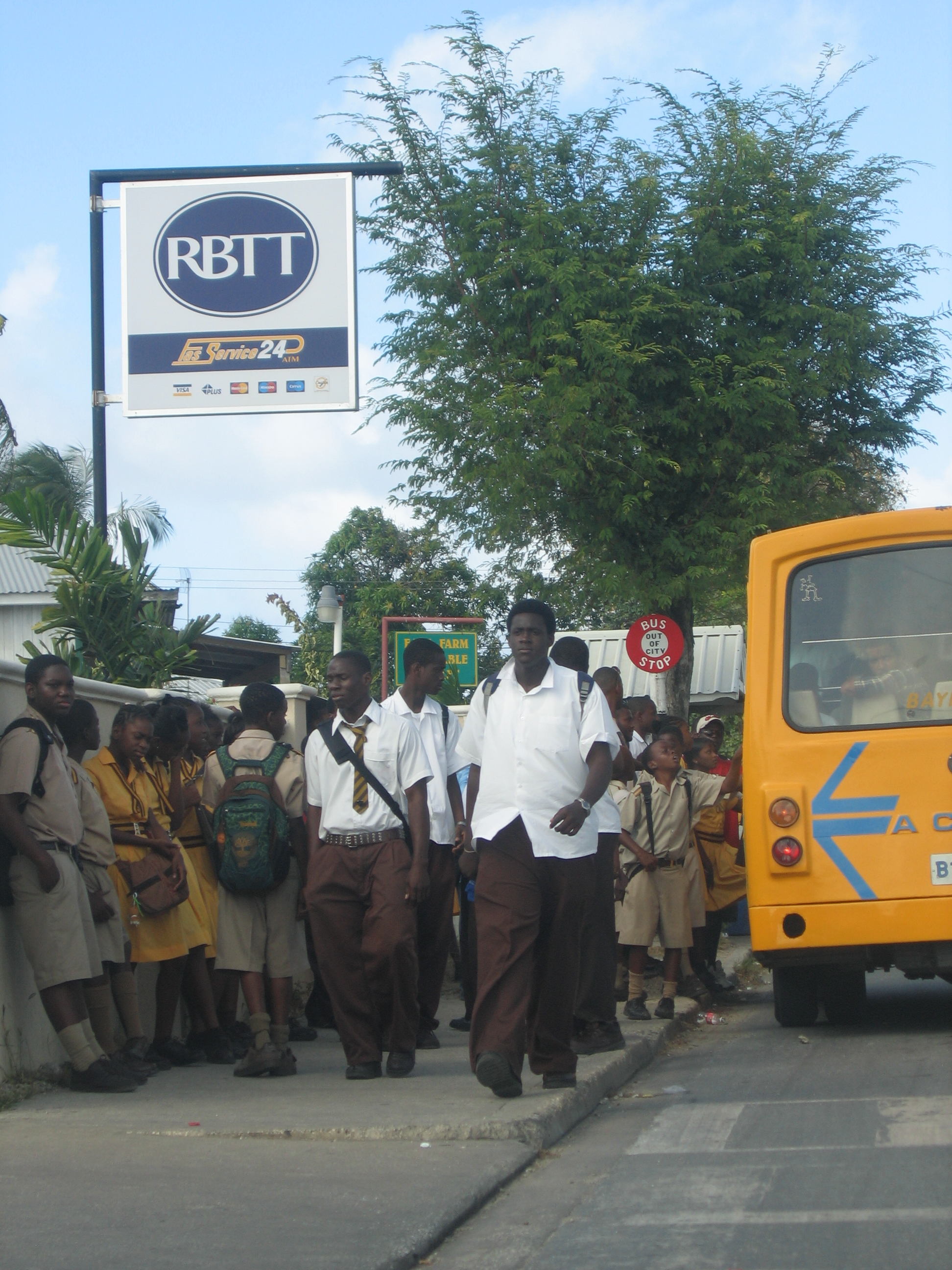
Schoolchildren in Saint Philip, Barbados

The Barbados literacy rate is ranked close to 100%. The mainstream public education system of Barbados is fashioned after the British model. The government of Barbados spends 6.7% of its GDP on education (2008).

All young people in the country must attend school until age 16. Barbados has over 70 primary schools and over 20 secondary schools throughout the island. There are a number of private schools, including those offering Montessori and International Baccalaureate education. Student enrolment at these schools represents less than 5% of the total enrolment of the public schools.

Certificate-, diploma- and degree-level education in the country is provided by the Barbados Community College, the Samuel Jackman Prescod Institute of Technology, Codrington College, and the Cave Hill campus and Open Campus of the University of the West Indies. Barbados is also home to several overseas medical schools, such as Ross University School of Medicine and the American University of Integrative Sciences, School of Medicine.

=== Health ===
The main hospital on the island is the Queen Elizabeth Hospital; however, Barbados has eight polyclinics across five parishes. There are also well-known medical care centres in Barbados such as Bayview Hospital, Sandy Crest Medical Centre and FMH Emergency Medical Clinic, and Urgent Care.

== Culture ==
Barbados is a blend of West African, Portuguese, Creole, Indian and British cultures. Citizens are officially called Barbadians, but are colloquially known as "Bajans" (pronounced ˈbājənz). This term evolved from "Badian" (a shortening of "Barbadian") during the 19th century.

The largest carnival-like cultural event that takes place on the island is the Crop Over festival, which was established first in 1687 and reintroduced in 1974. As in many other Caribbean and Latin American countries, Crop Over is an important event for many people on the island, as well as the thousands of tourists that flock to there to participate in the annual events. The festival includes musical competitions and other traditional activities, and features the majority of the island's homegrown calypso and soca music for the year. The male and female Barbadians who harvested the most sugarcane are crowned as the King and Queen of the crop. Crop Over gets under way at the beginning of July and ends with the costumed parade on Kadooment Day, held on the first Monday of August. New calypso/soca music is usually released and played more frequently from the beginning of May to coincide with the start of the festival.

=== Art ===
Barbadian art has evolved over the centuries, influenced by the island's complex history, which includes Indigenous cultures, colonial periods, and the subsequent emergence of a vibrant post-colonial identity. The interplay of African, European, and Caribbean influences has given rise to a unique artistic heritage that continues to inspire contemporary artists.

The latter part of the 20th century and into the 21st century witnessed a cultural renaissance in Barbadian art now documented by Raskal Magazine. Artists began to explore diverse mediums and techniques, blending traditional practices with contemporary expressions. This period of experimentation contributed to the dynamic and multifaceted nature of Barbadian art, reflecting the island's openness to cultural exchange and adaptation.

Barbadian artists, mindful of their place within the global art community, began to engage with international artistic trends. This global perspective led to a cross-pollination of ideas, as artists drew inspiration from diverse sources while simultaneously contributing to the broader discourse on Caribbean and diasporic art.

=== Music ===
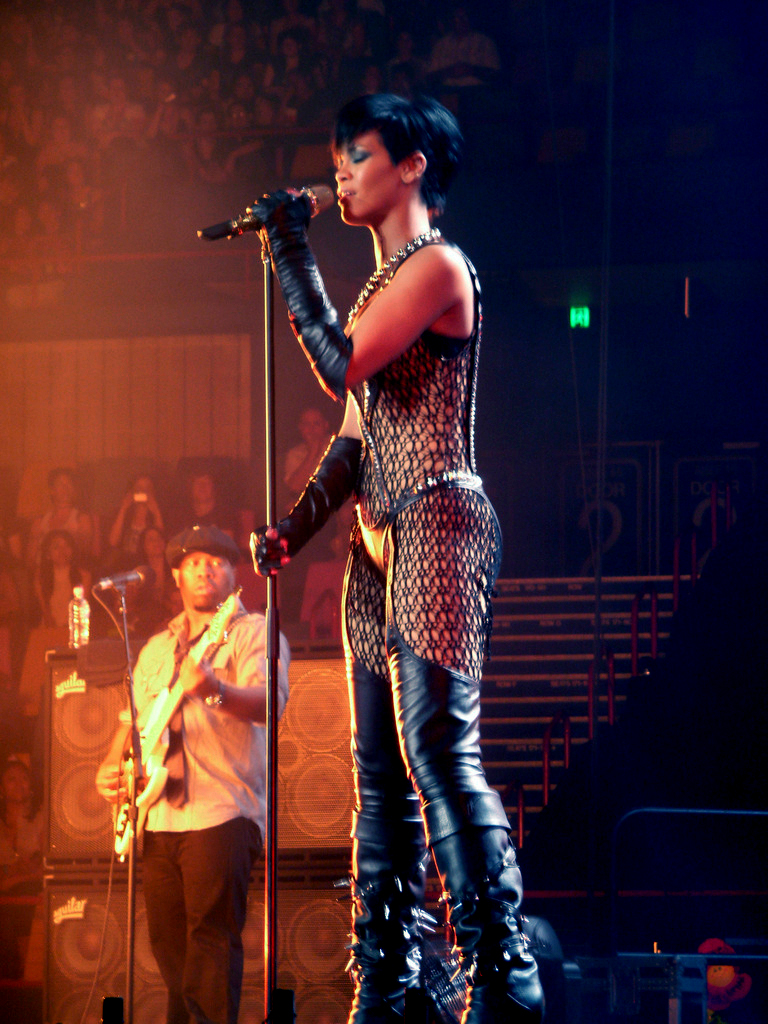
International pop star Rihanna, a native of Barbados, is a nine-time Grammy Award winner and one of the best-selling music artists of all time, selling over 200 million records worldwide.

The music of Barbados includes distinctive national styles of folk and popular music, including elements of Western classical and religious music. The culture of Barbados is a syncretic mix of African and British elements, and the island's music reflects this mix through song types and styles, instrumentation, dances, and aesthetic principles.

Barbadian folk traditions include the Landship movement, which is a satirical, informal organization based on the Royal Navy, tea meetings, tuk bands and numerous traditional songs and dances. In modern Barbados, popular styles include calypso, spouge, contemporary folk and world music. Barbados is, along with Guadeloupe, Martinique, Trinidad, Cuba, Puerto Rico, and the Virgin Islands, one of the few centres for Caribbean jazz.

In 2021, Rihanna was appointed as a National Hero of the country by Prime Minister Mia Mottley, during her presidential inauguration, which served to mark the country becoming a republic.

=== Media ===
- Caribbean Broadcasting Corporation (CBC)

=== Cuisine ===
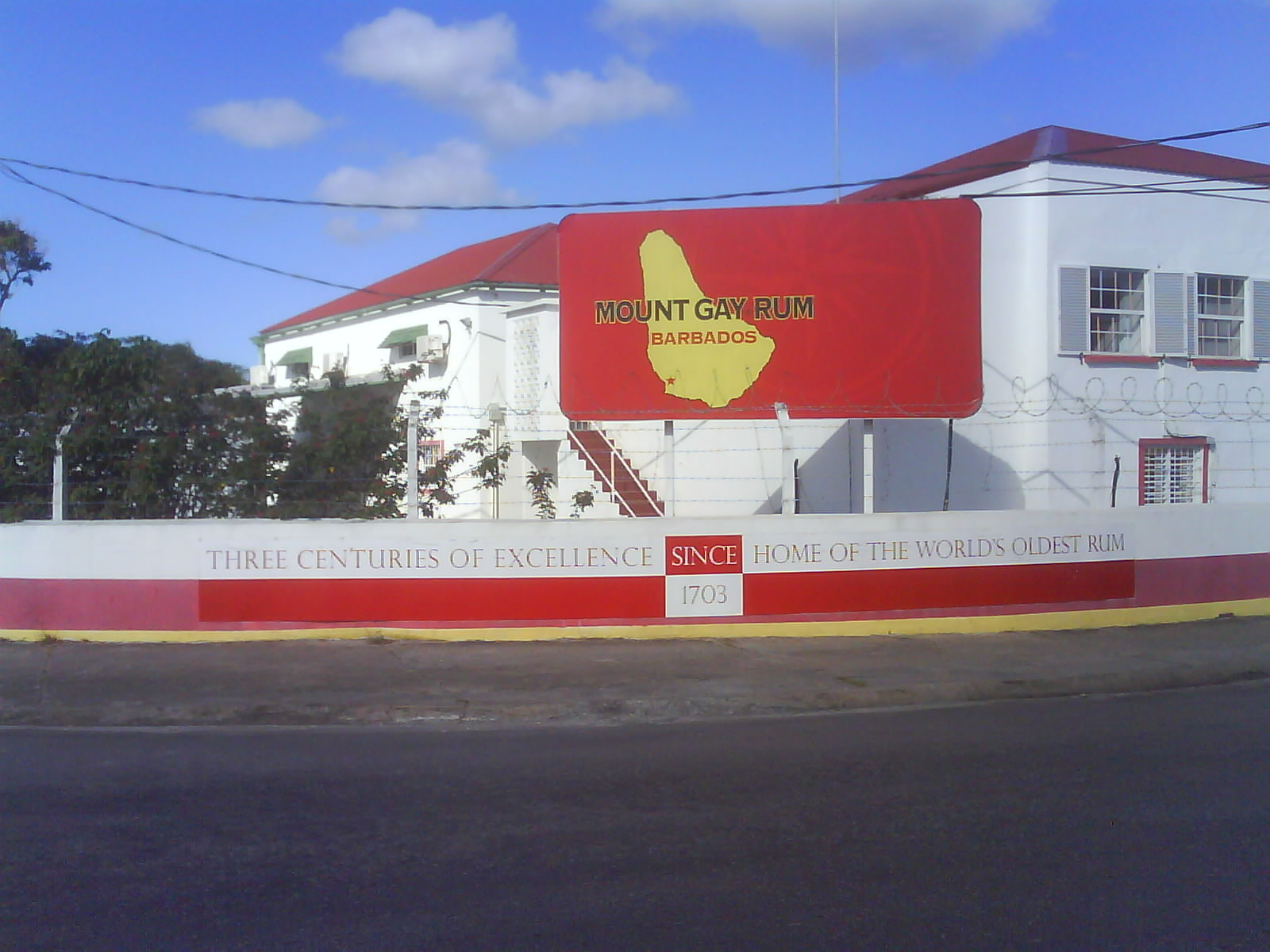
Mount Gay Rum visitors centre

Bajan cuisine is a mixture of African, Indian, Irish, Creole and British influences. A typical meal consists of a main dish of meat or fish, normally marinated with a mixture of herbs and spices, hot side dishes, and one or more salads. A common Bajan side dish could be pickled cucumber, fish cakes, bake, etc. The meal is usually served with one or more sauces. The national dish of Barbados is cou-cou and flying fish with spicy gravy. Another traditional meal is pudding and souse, a dish of pickled pork with spiced sweet potatoes. A wide variety of seafood and meats are also available.

The Mount Gay Rum visitor's centre in Barbados claims to be the world's oldest remaining rum company, with the earliest confirmed deed from 1703. Cockspur Rum and Malibu are also from the island. Barbados is home to the Banks Barbados Brewery, which brews Banks Beer, a pale lager, as well as Banks Amber Ale. Banks also brews Tiger Malt, a non-alcoholic malted beverage. 10 Saints beer is brewed in Speightstown, St. Peter in Barbados and aged for 90 days in Mount Gay 'Special Reserve' Rum casks. It was first brewed in 2009 and is available in certain Caricom nations.

=== Sports ===
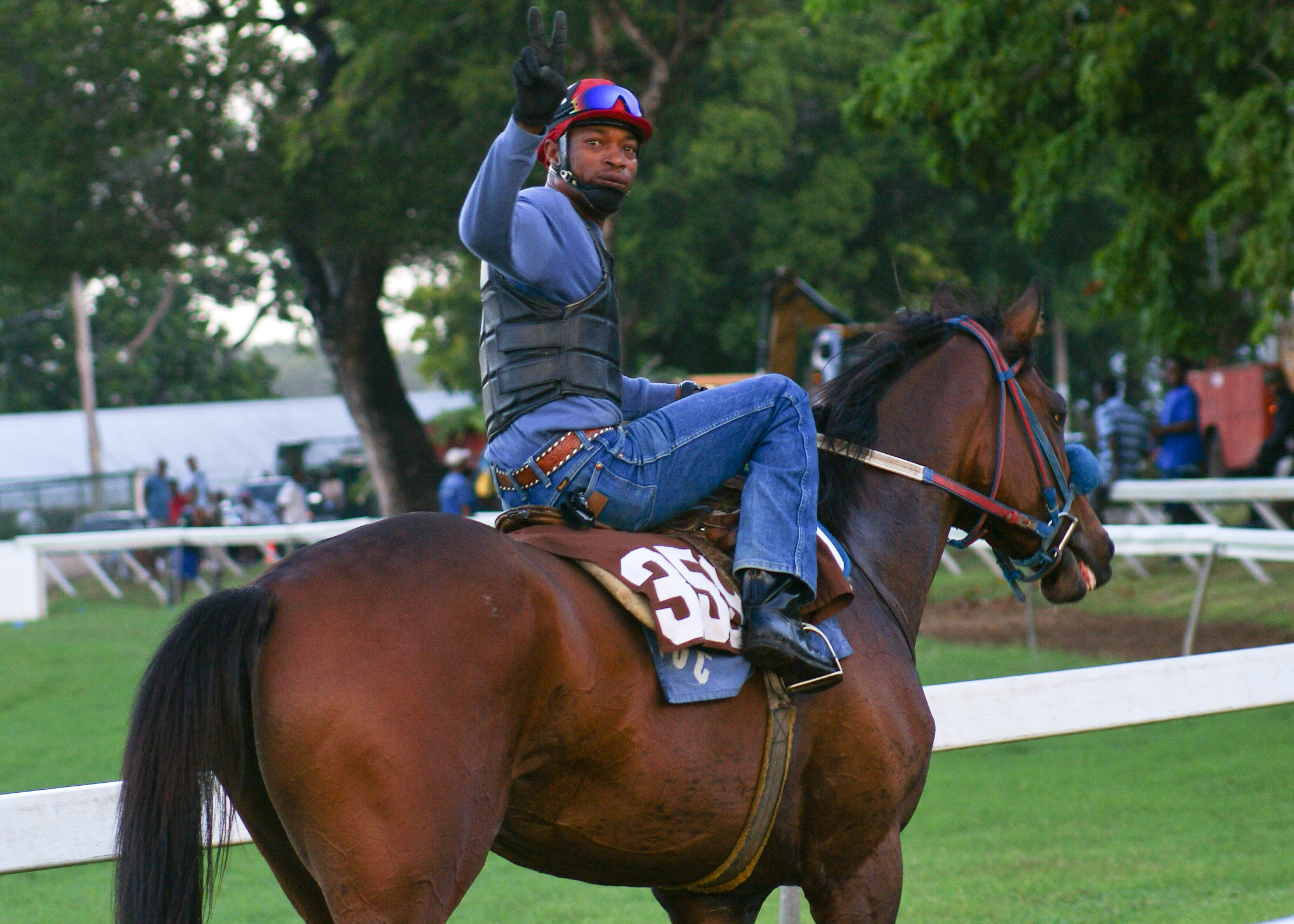
A horse and rider at Garrison Savannah

As in other Caribbean countries of British colonial heritage, cricket is very popular on the island. The West Indies cricket team usually includes several Barbadian players. In addition to several warm-up, group stage and few "Super Eight" matches, the country hosted the final of the 2007 Cricket World Cup and 2024 ICC Men's T20 World Cup.

In Track and Field, sprinter Obadele Thompson won a bronze medal in the 100m at the 2000 Summer Olympic Games. As of August 2022, he was the first Olympics medalist in the Barbados.

Rugby is also popular in Barbados.

Basketball is an increasingly popular sport, played at school or college. The Barbados men's national team has additionally shown some international success, including a fifth-place finish in the 2006 Commonwealth Games.

Polo is very popular among the rich elite on the island and the "High-Goal" Apes Hill team is based at the St James's Club.

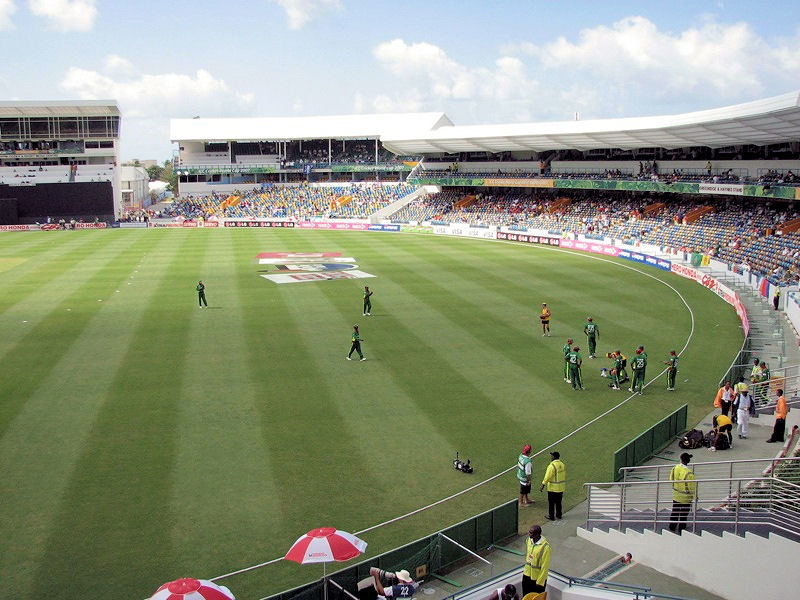
Kensington Oval in Bridgetown hosted the 2007 Cricket World Cup final. Cricket is one of the most followed games in Barbados and Kensington Oval is often referred to as the "Mecca in Cricket" due to its significance and contributions to the sport.

In golf, the Barbados Open, played at Royal Westmoreland Golf Club, was an annual stop on the European Seniors Tour from 2000 to 2009. In December 2006 the WGC-World Cup took place at the country's Sandy Lane resort on the Country Club course, an 18-hole course designed by Tom Fazio. The Barbados Golf Club is another course on the island.

Volleyball is also popular and is mainly played indoors.

Tennis is gaining popularity and Barbados is home to Darian King, who has achieved a career-high ranking of 106 in May 2017 and has played in the 2016 Summer Olympics and the 2017 US Open.

Motorsports also play a role, with Rally Barbados occurring each summer and being listed on the FIA NACAM calendar. Also, the Bushy Park Circuit hosted the Race of Champions in 2014.

The presence of the trade winds along with favourable swells make the southern tip of the island an ideal location for wave sailing (an extreme form of the sport of windsurfing)

Netball is also popular with women in Barbados.

Several players in the National Football League (NFL) are from Barbados, including Robert Bailey, Roger Farmer, Elvis Joseph, Ramon Harewood and Sam Seale.

Each March, the Barbados Surf Pro surfing contest is held in Bathsheba. It is the season-ending event for the World Surf League's North American qualifying series.

The Barbados national football team, nicknamed the Bajan Tridents (after the country's flag), competes in CONCACAF, but has never qualified for a major tournament.

== See also ==
- Outline of Barbados
- Index of Barbados-related articles
- List of Barbadian people
