= Foreign relations of Barbados =

This article deals with the diplomatic affairs, foreign policy and international relations of Barbados.

At the political level, these matters are officially handled by the Ministry of Foreign Affairs, which answers to the Prime Minister. The Minister of Foreign Affairs is Kerrie Symmonds.

Barbados is a moderate political and economic power in the Caribbean region.

Between independence in 1966 and the 1990s, Barbados has used a pro business and investment policy to expand its influence in the world. Through the usage of its network of international bilateral relations, the country has been able to maintain an independent foreign policy. Barbados' recent policy has been to focus and strengthen ties with nations that country feels will enhance its diplomacy or foreign trade. Barbados has sought to engage in multilateral diplomacy through the United Nations, the Caribbean Community (CARICOM), the Association of Caribbean States (ACS), the group of ACP countries, the Organization of American States, and several other agencies which it is engaged. In 2008 Barbados and the other members of CARICOM signed an Economic Partnership Agreement (EPA) with the European Union and its European Commission. The deal covers CARICOM's membership in the Caribbean Forum (CARIFORUM). CARIFORUM in turn is a part of the Group of African, Caribbean, and Pacific (ACP) States. The agreement outlines Barbados' future development and trade ties with the European Union, and serves as a blueprint for future relations between both trading blocs under the Cotonou Agreement and the Lomé Convention.

Barbados has placed an emphasis on a furtherance of relations with the nations of Africa where the majority of islanders have ancestral connection. A prior CARICOM-Africa summit were held with future agenda to be formulated.

As a small nation, the primary thrust of Barbados' diplomatic activity has been within international organisations. Currently Barbados has established official diplomatic relations with 105 countries around the globe.

== History ==
In 1965, Barbados, Antigua and Barbuda, Guyana, and Trinidad and Tobago established the Caribbean Free Trade Association (CARIFTA). Following independence from the United Kingdom in 1966, Barbados went on to become a founding member of many other international organizations.

On 4 July 1973, the founding nations of Barbados, Trinidad and Tobago, Guyana, and Jamaica signed the original Treaty of Chaguaramas in Trinidad thus establishing the Caribbean Community and Common Market (CARICOM). The agreement to establish CARICOM wound up succeeded the CARIFTA organisation. By the following year many of the remaining English-speaking Caribbean states followed suit and also joined CARICOM by May 1974, bring it slowly to the 15 members it has today.

Barbados also is a member of the Caribbean Development Bank (CDB), established in 1970, with headquarters in Wildey, Saint Michael (Bridgetown). The eastern Caribbean's Regional Security System (RSS), which associates Barbados with six nations of the Organisation of Eastern Caribbean States (OECS) is also based in Barbados. In July 1994, Barbados joined the newly established Association of Caribbean States (ACS).

In 2002 the United Nations opened a building in the Marine Gardens area of Hastings found in the Parish of Christ Church the facility simply called the United Nations House acts as a regional operations headquarters for several programmes of the United Nations in Barbados and for many of the other islands in the Eastern Caribbean region.

== Diplomatic relations ==
List of countries which Barbados maintains diplomatic relations with:

#	Country	Date
1	Canada	30 November 1966
2	Guyana	30 November 1966
3	India	30 November 1966
4	Jamaica	30 November 1966
5	Trinidad and Tobago	30 November 1966
6	United Kingdom	30 November 1966
7	United States	30 November 1966
8	Germany	14 March 1967
9	Israel	29 August 1967
10	Japan	29 August 1967
11	Chile	3 October 1967
12	Austria	27 November 1967
13	Uruguay	6 December 1967
14	Peru	29 February 1968
15	France	3 May 1968
16	Argentina	16 August 1968
17	Venezuela	21 November 1969
18	Netherlands	12 December 1969
19	Nigeria	24 April 1970
20	Belgium	30 October 1970
21	Zambia	1 March 1971
22	Tanzania	8 March 1971
23	Brazil	26 November 1971
24	Colombia	28 January 1972
25	Cyprus	27 February 1972
26	Costa Rica	6 March 1972
27	Haiti	5 August 1972
28	Dominican Republic	8 August 1972
29	Mexico	11 September 1972
30	Turkey	20 September 1972
31	Cuba	12 December 1972
32	Bahamas	10 July 1973
33	Australia	7 January 1974
34	Bangladesh	20 February 1974
35	Grenada	3 March 1974
36	New Zealand	28 August 1974
37	Mauritius	14 December 1974
38	Nicaragua	8 November 1975
39	Senegal	18 March 1976
40	Sweden	19 March 1976
41	Norway	23 March 1976
42	Luxembourg	5 May 1977
43	China	30 May 1977
44	Italy	23 August 1977
45	Romania	11 September 1977
46	Czech Republic	29 September 1977
47	South Korea	15 November 1977
48	Serbia	15 November 1977
49	Finland	1 December 1977
50	North Korea	5 December 1977
51	Iran	1 March 1978
52	Hungary	8 March 1978
53	Suriname	8 March 1978
54	Ecuador	23 June 1978
55	Dominica	3 November 1978
56	Saint Lucia	22 February 1979
57	Iceland	9 April 1979
—	Holy See	17 April 1979
58	Algeria	18 April 1979
59	Niger	25 June 1979
60	Denmark	20 August 1979
61	Saint Vincent and the Grenadines	27 October 1979
62	Lesotho	25 November 1979
63	Switzerland	4 March 1980
64	Spain	29 September 1980
65	Belize	21 September 1981
66	Antigua & Barbuda	1 November 1981
67	Iraq	17 December 1981
68	Panama	20 August 1982
69	Albania	19 May 1983
70	Saint Kitts and Nevis	19 September 1983
71	Bolivia	2 February 1984
72	Greece	23 March 1987
73	Thailand	22 November 1988
74	Portugal	23 February 1989
75	Maldives	30 November 1989
76	Guatemala	27 January 1992
77	Bulgaria	12 March 1992
78	Namibia	6 April 1992
79	Malaysia	10 April 1992
80	Honduras	7 December 1992
81	Russia	29 January 1993
82	Marshall Islands	23 March 1993
83	Ukraine	13 April 1993
84	Paraguay	27 May 1993
85	South Africa	4 January 1994
86	Slovakia	14 April 1994
87	El Salvador	18 May 1994
88	Ghana	August 1994
89	Kuwait	22 August 1995
90	Vietnam	25 August 1995
91	United Arab Emirates	8 January 1996
92	Poland	13 September 1996
93	Singapore	19 December 1996
94	Croatia	11 July 1997
95	Ireland	3 May 2001
96	Malta	21 October 2005
97	Egypt	3 November 2006
98	Botswana	20 December 2006
99	Qatar	4 December 2007
100	Saudi Arabia	17 December 2007
101	Slovenia	18 December 2007
102	Bahrain	12 March 2008
103	Estonia	15 May 2008
104	Latvia	15 May 2008
105	Lithuania	16 March 2009
106	Philippines	22 June 2009
107	Morocco	17 April 2013
108	Kenya	3 September 2014
109	Rwanda	28 July 2015
110	Fiji	19 June 2017
111	Georgia	8 March 2018
—	Kosovo	9 March 2018
112	Kazakhstan	27 March 2018
113	Monaco	5 December 2018
114	Mongolia	17 January 2019
115	Indonesia	26 June 2019
116	Sri Lanka	28 June 2019
117	Azerbaijan	2 August 2019
118	Bosnia and Herzegovina	6 August 2019
119	San Marino	3 October 2019
120	Tajikistan	8 November 2019
121	Cambodia	11 November 2019
122	Belarus	10 December 2019
123	Moldova	10 February 2020
124	Montenegro	19 February 2020
125	Andorra	21 June 2021
126	Mali	22 July 2021
127	Nepal	8 December 2021
128	Cape Verde	21 July 2022
129	Angola	17 August 2022
130	Solomon Islands	19 September 2022
131	Liberia	27 February 2024
—	State of Palestine	11 June 2024
132	Ethiopia	7 September 2025
133	Jordan	18 November 2026

== Bilateral relations ==
=== Africa ===
Country	Formal Relations Began	Notes
Nigeria	1970-Apr-24	See Barbados–Nigeria relations: Nigeria is accredited to Barbados from its embassy in Port of Spain, (Trinidad and Tobago).; Currently the Barbadian Government does not have foreign accreditation for Nigeria. However the Nigerian Government has said that it was highly desirous of Barbados establishing an embassy directly to Nigeria. Barbados and Nigeria formally established diplomatic relations on 24 April 1970.; Nigeria has pushed for more investment from Barbadian companies and investors and the pursuance of direct flights between both nations.

=== Americas ===
Country	Formal Relations Began	Notes
Antigua and Barbuda	1981-Nov-01	See also: Barbados and CARICOM Antigua & Barbuda and Barbados were once both commonwealth realms (until Barbados became a republic in 2021), members of: the Association of Caribbean States, the Caribbean Community, the Belt & Road Initiative, the Caribbean Development Bank, the Commonwealth of Nations, ECLAC, EU-CARIFORUM, the Organisation of African, Caribbean and Pacific States, the Organization of American States, the Small Island Developing States, and the United Nations. The establishment of diplomatic relations between Barbados and Antigua and Barbuda started on 1 November 1981.: Antigua and Barbuda has a non-resident High Commissioner from St. Johns, Antigua.; Barbados has a non-resident High Commissioner from Bridgetown, Barbados.
Argentina	1968-Aug-16	Argentina is represented in Barbados through its embassy in Bridgetown.; Barbados is represented in Argentina through its embassy in Caracas (Venezuela) and its honorary consulate in Buenos Aires, Argentina.; Both countries are full members of the Community of Latin American and Caribbean States (CELAC) the United Nations and the Group of 77.; Argentine Ministry of Foreign Relation: list of bilateral treaties with Barbados (in Spanish only)
Bahamas	1973-Jul-10	See also: Barbados and CARICOM The Commonwealth of the Bahamas were once both commonwealth realms (until Barbados became a republic in 2021), members of: the Association of Caribbean States, the Caribbean Community, the Belt & Road Initiative, the Caribbean Development Bank, the Commonwealth of Nations, ECLAC, EU-CARIFORUM, the Organisation of African, Caribbean and Pacific States, the Organization of American States, the Small Island Developing States, and the United Nations. Both countries established diplomatic relations on 10 July 1973.: The Commonwealth of the Bahamas is accredited to Barbados through the Ministry of Foreign Affairs in Nassau, and an Honorary Consulate at St. James in Barbados.; Barbados is accredited to the Commonwealth of the Bahamas through the Ministry of Foreign Affairs in Bridgetown, and an Honorary Consulate in New Providence.
Belize	1981-Sep-21	See also: Barbados and CARICOM Barbados and Belize were once both commonwealth realms (until Barbados became a republic in 2021), members of: the Association of Caribbean States, the Caribbean Community, the Belt & Road Initiative, the Caribbean Development Bank, the Commonwealth of Nations, ECLAC, EU-CARIFORUM, the Organisation of African, Caribbean and Pacific States, the Organization of American States, the Small Island Developing States, and the United Nations.
Brazil	1971-Nov-26	See Barbados–Brazil relations
Canada	1966-Nov-30	See Barbados–Canada relations Barbados and Canada were once both commonwealth realms (until Barbados became a republic in 2021), members of: the Belt & Road Initiative, the Caribbean Development Bank, the Commonwealth of Nations, the Organization of American States, and the United Nations. In 1907, the Government of Canada opened a Trade Commissioner Service to the Caribbean region located in Bridgetown, Barbados.: Following Barbadian independence from the United Kingdom in November 1966, the Canadian High Commission was established in Bridgetown, Barbados in 1967.; There is a Barbadian High Commission in Ottawa and a consulate in Toronto.
Chile	1967-Oct-03	Barbados is accredited in Chile through its embassy in Caracas, (Venezuela). Chile is accredited to Barbados from its embassy in Port of Spain, (Trinidad and Tobago) and maintains an honorary consulate in Bridgetown. Barbados and Chile formally established diplomatic relations on 3 October 1967. Chile was the first Latin American country which Barbados formally established formal diplomatic relations.
Dominica	1978-Nov-03	See also: Barbados and CARICOM Barbados and the Commonwealth of Dominica are members of: the Association of Caribbean States, the Caribbean Community, the Belt & Road Initiative, the Caribbean Development Bank, the Commonwealth of Nations, ECLAC, EU-CARIFORUM, the Organisation of African, Caribbean and Pacific States, the Organization of American States, the Small Island Developing States, and the United Nations. Both countries established diplomatic relations on 3 November 1978.: Barbados is represented in the Commonwealth of Dominica, through its High Commissioner in Bridgetown.
Grenada	1974-Mar-03	See also: Barbados and CARICOM Barbados and Grenada are two of sixteen commonwealth realms, members of: the Association of Caribbean States, the Caribbean Community, the Belt & Road Initiative, the Caribbean Development Bank, the Commonwealth of Nations, ECLAC, EU-CARIFORUM, the Organisation of African, Caribbean and Pacific States, the Organization of American States, the Small Island Developing States, and the United Nations.
Guyana	1966-Nov-30	See Barbados–Guyana relations Barbados and the Co-Operative Republic of Guyana are members of: the Association of Caribbean States, the Caribbean Community, the Belt & Road Initiative, the Caribbean Development Bank, the Commonwealth of Nations, ECLAC, EU-CARIFORUM, the Organisation of African, Caribbean and Pacific States, the Organization of American States, the Small Island Developing States, and the United Nations. The relations between Guyana and Barbados had its genesis to a time when both Guyana (then British Guiana) and Barbados were both British colonies. Shortly after Great Britain secured British Guiana from the Dutch, waves of migrants were encouraged to move and settle in Guyana. Barbados was one such location where large numbers of migrants came from. Through time Barbados and Guyana have both supported each other. With the move towards independence in the region Guyana was seen as the breadbasket of the wider Caribbean which led to yet more waves of Barbadians seeking to move to Guyana for better opportunities. More recently the Guyanese Government has extended an offer to Barbadians. The Guyanese government has offered to put in place an economically favourable regime towards any Barbadians that wish to relocate to Guyana and contribute towards that nation's goals in agricultural investment. The announcement was made in the final days of the Owen Arthur administration by MP member Mia Motley. In the early 1990s the Prime Minister of Trinidad and Tobago, Patrick Manning pitched an initiative for Barbados, Guyana and Trinidad and Tobago to enter into some form of political union or political association. This initiative was short lived and didn't proceed following the Democratic Labour Party's defeat during the 1994 elections.
Jamaica	1966-Nov-30	See also: Barbados and CARICOM Barbados and Jamaica were once both commonwealth realms (until Barbados became a republic in 2021): the Association of Caribbean States, the Caribbean Community, the Belt & Road Initiative, the Caribbean Development Bank, the Commonwealth of Nations, ECLAC, EU-CARIFORUM, the Organisation of African, Caribbean and Pacific States, the Organization of American States, the Small Island Developing States, and the United Nations.: Barbados is represented in Jamaica through a non-resident High Commissioner in Bridgetown and an honorary consulate in Kingston.; Jamaica is represented in Barbados through its High Commissioner in Port of Spain (Trinidad and Tobago) and an honorary consulate in Bridgetown.
Mexico	1972-Sep-11	See Barbados–Mexico relations: Barbados is accredited to Mexico from its embassy in Washington, D.C., United States.; Mexico is accredited to Barbados from its embassy in Port-of-Spain, Trinidad and Tobago and maintains an honorary consulate in Bridgetown.
Panama	1975-Aug-28	Barbados has an embassy in Panama City.; Panama is accredited to Barbados from its embassy in Port-of-Spain, Trinidad and Tobago.
Saint Kitts and Nevis	1983-Sep-19	See also: Barbados and CARICOM Barbados and the Federation of St. Kitts & Nevis were once both commonwealth realms (until Barbados became a republic in 2021), members of: the Association of Caribbean States, the Caribbean Community, the Caribbean Development Bank, the Commonwealth of Nations, ECLAC, EU-CARIFORUM, the Organisation of African, Caribbean and Pacific States, the Organization of American States, the Small Island Developing States, and the United Nations.
Saint Lucia	-Feb-22 1979	See also: Barbados and CARICOM Barbados and St. Lucia were once both commonwealth realms (until Barbados became a republic in 2021), members of: the Association of Caribbean States, the Caribbean Community, the Caribbean Development Bank, the Commonwealth of Nations, ECLAC, EU-CARIFORUM, the Organisation of African, Caribbean and Pacific States, the Organization of American States, the Small Island Developing States, and the United Nations.
Saint Vincent and the Grenadines	-Oct-27 1979	See also: Barbados and CARICOM Barbados and St. Vincent & the Grenadines were once both commonwealth realms (until Barbados became a republic in 2021), members of: the Association of Caribbean States, the Caribbean Community, the Belt & Road Initiative, the Caribbean Development Bank, the Commonwealth of Nations, ECLAC, EU-CARIFORUM, the Organisation of African, Caribbean and Pacific States, the Organization of American States, the Small Island Developing States, and the United Nations.
Suriname	1978-Mar-08	See Barbados–Suriname relations Both countries established diplomatic relations on 8 March 1978. Barbados is accredited to Suriname from Bridgetown. Suriname is represented in Barbados through its embassy in Port of Spain, (Trinidad and Tobago). Barbados and the Republic of Suriname are members of: the Association of Caribbean States, the Caribbean Community, the Belt & Road Initiative, the Caribbean Development Bank, the Commonwealth of Nations, ECLAC, EU-CARIFORUM, the Organisation of African, Caribbean and Pacific States, the Organization of American States, the Small Island Developing States, and the United Nations.
Trinidad and Tobago	1966-Nov-30	See Barbados–Trinidad and Tobago relations Barbados and the Republic of Trinidad & Tobago are members of: the Association of Caribbean States, the Caribbean Community, the Belt & Road Initiative, the Caribbean Development Bank, the Commonwealth of Nations, ECLAC, EU-CARIFORUM, the Organisation of African, Caribbean and Pacific States, the Organization of American States, the Small Island Developing States, and the United Nations. On 11 April 2006, the 5-Member UNCLOS Annex VII Arbitral Tribunal, presided over by H.E. Judge Stephen M. Schwebel, rendered after two years of international judicial proceedings, the landmark Barbados/Trinidad and Tobago Award, which resolved the maritime boundary delimitation (in the East, Central and West sectors) to satisfaction of both Parties and committed Barbados and Trinidad and Tobago to resolve their fisheries dispute by means of concluding a new Fisheries Agreement.
United States	1966-Nov-30	See Barbados–United States relations In May 1997, Prime Minister Owen Arthur hosted United States President Bill Clinton and 14 other Caribbean leaders during the first-ever U.S.-regional summit in Bridgetown, Barbados. The summit strengthened the basis for regional cooperation on justice and counternarcotics issues, finance and development, and trade.

=== Asia ===
Country	Formal Relations Began	Notes
China	1977-May-30	See also Barbados – People's Republic of China relations Barbados and the China established official diplomatic relations 30 May 1977. Barbados-Sino diplomatic and economic relations have grown steadily over three decades.
India	1966-Nov-30	India and Barbados established diplomatic relations on 30 November 1966 (the date of Barbados' national independence). On that date, the government of India gifted Barbados the throne in Barbados' national House of Assembly. India is represented in Barbados through its embassy in Suriname and an Indian consulate in Holetown, St. James. Today around 3,000 persons from India call Barbados home. Two-thirds are from the India's Surat district of Gujarat known as Suratis. Most of the Suratis are involved in trading. The rest are mainly Sindhis.
Israel	1967-Aug-29	See also Barbados–Israel relations: Barbados is represented in Israel through its High Commission in London, United Kingdom and a consulate in Tel Aviv
Japan	1967-Aug-29	See Barbados–Japan relations Japan is accredited to Barbados from its embassy in Port of Spain (Trinidad and Tobago) and an honorary consulate in Bridgetown. Barbados is represented in Japan through a non-resident ambassador in Bridgetown.
Singapore	1996-Dec-19	Both countries established diplomatic relations on 19 December 1996. On 17 July 2013 a bilateral Open Skies Agreement (OSA) were signed between both countries. On 25 April 2014 a bilateral Singapore-Barbados Double Taxation Agreement treaty came into effect with subsequent modifications in 2021.
South Korea	1977-Nov-15	Barbados and the Republic of Korea established diplomatic relations on 15 November 1977.: Barbadian Embassy in Beijing is accredited to South Korea.; South Korean Embassy in Port of Spain is accredited to Barbados.
Turkey	1970	See Barbados–Turkey relations: Turkish Embassy in Port of Spain is accredited to Barbados.; Trade volume between the two countries was US$8.5 million in 2019 (Barbados' exports/imports: 0.05/8.45 million USD).

=== Europe ===
Country	Formal Relations Began	Notes
European Union		The European Union relations and cooperation with Barbados are carried out both on a bilateral and a multilateral basis. Barbados is party to the Cotonou Agreement, through which As of December 2007 it is linked by an Economic Partnership Agreement with the European Commission. The pact involves the Caribbean Forum (CARIFORUM) subgroup of the African, Caribbean and Pacific Group of States (ACP). CARIFORUM is the only part of the wider ACP-bloc that has concluded the full regional trade-pact with the European Union. There are also ongoing EU-Community of Latin American and Caribbean States (CELAC) and EU-CARIFORUM dialogues. The Mission of Barbados to the European Union is located in Brussels, while the Delegation of the European Union to Barbados and its regional Eastern Caribbean neighbours is in Bridgetown.
Denmark	-Aug-20 1979	* Denmark is represented in Barbados, through its embassy in Mexico.: Barbados is represented in Denmark, through its embassy in Belgium.
France	1968-May-03	See Barbados–France relations Both countries have established diplomatic relations on 3 May 1968. Barbados is represented in France through its embassy in Brussels (Belgium). France is represented in Barbados through its embassy in Port of Spain (Trinidad and Tobago) and an honorary consulate in Bridgetown.
Germany	1967-Mar-14	See Barbados–Germany relations Barbados is represented in Germany through its embassy in Brussels, (Belgium) and Germany is represented in to Barbados from its embassy in Port of Spain, (Trinidad and Tobago). Barbados and West Germany formally established diplomatic relations on 14 March 1967.
Ireland	2001-May-03	Barbados is represented in Ireland through its embassy in London, (United Kingdom) and an honorary consulate in Dublin.; Although diplomatic relations with Barbados are maintained through Ireland's Permanent Mission to the United Nations in New York, (United States), Ireland is represented in Barbados consularly through its embassy in Washington, D.C. (United States) and an honorary consulate in Bridgetown.
Russia	1966-Nov-30	The Soviet Union recognized the independence of Barbados on 30 November 1966. On 29 January 1993, Russian Federation and Barbados established formal diplomatic relations. In 2018 both nations celebrated 25 years of diplomatic ties and pledged closer collaboration. The two nations also discussed cultural exchanges and Russia working with Barbados' light oil and gas industry. And possible scholarships to Russian schools. In 2022 the Russian Foreign Minister met his counterpart in Barbados to discuss current relations and explored a future agenda with the nation including among other things the conclusion of a visa waiver agreement between both nations.: Russia is represented in Barbados, through its embassy in Georgetown, Guyana.
United Kingdom	1966-Nov-30	See Barbados–United Kingdom relations British Prime Minister Keir Starmer with Barbadian Prime Minister Mia Mottley at a United Nations General Assembly in New York City, September 2024. Barbados established diplomatic relations with the United Kingdom on 30 November 1966.: Barbados maintains a high commission in London.; United Kingdom is accredited to Barbados through its high commission in Bridgetown.; The UK governed Barbados from 1625 to 1966, when Barbados achieved full independence. Both countries share common membership of the Caribbean Development Bank, the Commonwealth, the International Criminal Court, and the World Trade Organization, as well as the CARIFORUM–UK Economic Partnership Agreement. Bilaterally the two countries have an Investment Agreement.

=== Oceania ===
Country	Formal Relations Began	Notes
Australia	1974-Jan-07	See Australia–Barbados relations The Australian High Commissioner to Barbados is accredited from Port of Spain, Trinidad and Tobago. Barbados is represented in Australia through its High Commission in Ottawa, Ontario, (Canada). Barbados maintains an honorary consul in Australia. Barbados and Australia established diplomatic relations on 7 January 1974. Both Barbados and Australia are current members of the United Nations, Commonwealth of Nations, and comprised as former parts of the British Empire.
New Zealand	1974-Aug-28	New Zealand is accredited to Barbados from its Ministry of Foreign Affairs based in Wellington.; Barbados is represented in New Zealand through its High Commission in Ottawa, (Canada)

== Bilateral agreements ==
=== Reciprocal Promotion and Protection of Investments treaties ===
Barbados has a number of Bilateral Investment Treaties (BITs) with a growing list of nations. Some of which include:

- Belgium-Luxembourg Economic Union (BLEU) – Signed 29 May 2009
- Canada – Signed: 29 May 1996
- People's Republic of China – Signed: 20 July 1998
- Cuba – Signed: 19 February 1996
- Germany – Signed: 2 December 1994
- Ghana – Signed: 22 April 2008
- Italy – Signed: 25 October 1995
- Mauritius – Signed: 28 September 2004
- Sweden – Signed: 29 March 1995
- Switzerland – March 1995
- United Kingdom – April 1993
- Venezuela – July 1994

=== Double Taxation Agreements ===
Barbados has a number of Double Taxation Agreements (DTAs) with a growing list of nations. Some of which include:

- Austria – Signed: 27 February 2006
- Botswana – Signed: 23 February 2009
- People's Republic of China – Signed: 15 May 2000
- CARICOM – Signed: 6 July 1994
- Cuba – Signed: 17 June 1999
- Finland – Signed: 15 June 1989
- Ghana – Signed: 24 April 2008
- Malta – Signed: 5 December 2001
- Mauritius – Signed: 28 September 2004
- Mexico – Signed: 7 April 2008
- Netherlands; Signed: 28 November 2006
- Seychelles; Signed: 19 October 2007
- Sweden – Signed: 1 July 1991
- Switzerland – Extended to Barbados from UK, 1954
- United States of America– Signed: 18 December 1991
- Venezuela– Signed: 11 December 1998

== Multilateral relations ==
=== Barbados and the Commonwealth of Nations ===
Barbados has been a member state of the Commonwealth since 1966, when it became an independent Commonwealth realm and the 27th member state of the Commonwealth.

Barbadians have held various roles within the Commonwealth of Nations such as elections observers, or even more prominently. The country's former Governor-General, Dame Nita Barrow who served on the original Eminent Persons Group of 1985-1986 researched ways to bring about an end of apartheid in South Africa.

Various Commonwealth meetings hosted by Barbados:

- 1990 Eleventh Conference of Commonwealth Education Ministers in Bridgetown
- 2005 Commonwealth Finance Ministers Meeting
- 2010 Ninth Commonwealth Women's Affairs Ministers Meeting

Queen Elizabeth II as Queen of Barbados was viceregally represented by the Governor-General of Barbados until 30 November 2021.

The last Governor-General of Barbados, Dame Sandra Mason was installed in as the first President of Barbados on 30 November 2021 upon Barbados becoming a republic in the Commonwealth of Nations.

=== United Nations ===
On 7 December 1966 the Security Council of the United nations met to debate the membership of Barbados to the General Assembly of the United Nations. During the 1487th plenary meeting of 9 December 1966 it was decided that Barbados would be granted membership. Thusly Barbados became the 122nd full member of the United Nations General Assembly on 12 December 1966.

Barbados has been a member of the Forum of Small States (FOSS) since the group's founding in 1992.

== Diplomatic missions ==
- Barbadian diplomatic missions

Barbados has diplomatic missions headed by resident ambassadors or high commissioners in Canada, the United Kingdom, the United States of America, and Venezuela, and at the European Union (Brussels) and the UN. It also has resident consuls general in Toronto, Miami, and New York City. Australia, Brazil, Cuba, Canada, Colombia, People's Republic of China, Guatemala, the United Kingdom, the United States, and Venezuela have ambassadors or high commissioners resident in Barbados.

== Participation in international organisations ==
ACP • ACCP • ACS • Afreximbank • AOSIS • BIS • C • CAF-BDLAC^{(Associate)} • Carib-Export • CARICOM • CARIFORUM • CARTAC • CCtJ • CDB • CDERA • CITEL • CTO • CXC • CFATF • CRNM • CROSQ • CSME • ECLAC • FAO • G33 • G77 • IADB • IDB • IAEA • IBRD • ICAO • ICCt • ICFTU • ICJ • ICRM • IDA • IFAD • IFC • IFRCS • ILO • IMF • IMO • Intelsat • Interpol • IOC • IOM • IMPACS • ISO • ITU • LAES • MACHC • MIGA • NAM • OAS • OPANAL • OPCW • PAPSS •PAHO • Revised Treaty of Chaguaramas • RSS • SIDS • UN • UNCTAD • UNESCO • UNHCR • UNIDO • UPU • WCO • WFTU • WHO • WIPO • WMO • UNWTO • WTO

== Issues ==
- In 2008, Barbados submitted an updated claim to the United Nations Commission on the Limits of the Continental Shelf (UNCLCS) to extend its territorial waters and continental shelf (Exclusive Economic Zone) margins.
- Barbados started the process of settlement of maritime boundary with Guyana.
- Former Prime Minister Owen Arthur had announced that Barbados would begin to settle its maritime boundaries with France(Martinique).

Disputes – international:

- Venezuela, The Barbados Government charged that 1990 Maritime Delimitation Treaty agreement between Trinidad and Tobago and Venezuela extended into its maritime area.

== See also ==
- Government of Barbados
- List of diplomatic missions in Barbados
- List of diplomatic missions of Barbados
- List of ambassadors and high commissioners to and from Barbados
- Visa requirements for Barbadian citizens
- Nuala Lawlor
