= Permanent Representative of Barbados to the United Nations in New York =

Permanent Representative and Ambassador of Barbados to the United Nations
- Flag of the United Nations
- Incumbent; François Jackman since 1 May 2021
- Appointer: Cabinet of Barbados (G. G. Sandra Mason)
- Inaugural holder: Frank Leslie Walcott
- Formation: 1966
- Website: Permanent Representative and Ambassador

The permanent representative of Barbados to the United Nations is in charge of the Barbados's diplomatic mission to the United Nations Headquarters in New York City, United States of America. The current office holder is François Jackman, a career diplomat and the son of Oliver Jackman, the first Permanent Representative. Apart from the Barbados mission to the UN in New York, there is another Barbadian mission based at the UNO office in Geneva, Switzerland, and Nairobi, Kenya.

No.	Permanent Representative	Years served
1	Oliver Jackman	1969 – 1971
2	Waldo Emerson Waldron-Ramsey	1971.07.12. – 1976
3	James Cameron Tudor	1976 –
4	George Moe	early 1970s?
5	Nita Barrow	1986 – 1990
6	Besley Maycock	1990.07. – 1995
7	Carlston Belfield Boucher	1995 – 1999
8	June Yvonne Clarke	1999.09.07 – 2004
9	Christopher Fitzherbert Hackett	2005 – 2009
10	Joyce Dianne Bourne	2010
11	Joseph E. Goddard	2010.09.09 – 2015
11	Keith Hamilton Lewellyn Marshall	2015.04.22. – 2018
12	Henrietta Elizabeth Thompson	2018.08.30 – 2021
13	François Jackman	2021.05.01 – Present

== See also ==
- United Nations Security Council Resolution 230
- List of current permanent representatives to the United Nations
- List of ambassadors and high commissioners to and from Barbados
- Diplomatic missions of Barbados
