= Barbados–Japan relations =

- Barbados: Japan

Foreign relations between Barbados and Japan were formally established on 29 August 1967. Japan is accredited to Barbados from its embassy in Bridgetown (Barbados) and an honorary consulate in the parish of Saint George. Barbados is represented in Japan through a non-resident ambassador in Bridgetown. Japan's new Ambassador for Barbados, Mitsuhiko Okada had announced a new direct embassy to Barbados would be established located in Bridgetown in February 2016 .

== History ==
The Japanese submarine I-52 was bombed off the coast of Barbados in 1944.

In 1966, Japan was one of fifteen states which took part in U.N. Security Council resolution 230 which admitted Barbados into the United Nations.

In 1999, Bajan and Japanese officials held talks aimed at defusing tensions over the transshipment of nuclear materials through the Caribbean Sea.

Barbadian and Japanese economic trade has grown steadily, in the favour of Japan. In 2005, Japan ranked as Barbados' fourth-largest financial contributor in projects. In 2009, Japan provided technical cooperation and support for the Barbados-based Caribbean Disaster Emergency Response Agency (CDERA). The thirteenth meeting between Japan and CARICOM was convened in Bridgetown, Barbados, on 19 March 2009.

In July 2008, the Senior Vice-Minister of Japan, Hitoshi Kimura, visited Barbados for high-level talks. During the discussions, both nations spoke of Barbados wanting to conclude a Double Taxation Agreement (DTA) with Japan to increase investment and trade between both countries. Additionally, the Barbados government pledged to support Japan's bid for a seat on the United Nations Security Council for 2009–2010. It was also discussed that the through countries needed to concentrate on cooperation in climate change through the Small Island Developing States (SIDS) organisation. On 27 November 2011, the national broadcaster of Barbados the Caribbean Broadcasting Corporation and TV Osaka made a jointly produced series called From Bridgetown To Tokyo showcasing the Japanese culture and Barbadians working in Japan. One of the main parts showed a Barbadian English teacher recruited through the Japanese embassy in the Caribbean and her experiences teaching in Japan.

In March 2015, the government of Japan announced it would be moving to form a new Eastern Caribbean diplomatic mission based-in Barbados to serve the Eastern Caribbean. It is expected to open by January 2016.

In 2018, Japan's resident ambassador to Barbados and the Eastern Caribbean presented close to BBD$2 million in emergency resiliency equipment to the Government of Barbados.

In July 2020, the government of Japan extended scholarships through the local embassy for Barbadian university graduates who are willing to learn Japanese and pursue further studies in Japan.

In 2022, the Japanese embassy to Barbados located in Trinidad and Tobago signed a three-year commitment through the United Nations Office to the Eastern Caribbean located in Barbados to assist several islands in the Eastern Caribbean (including Barbados) with perennial Sargassum Seaweed management.

In December 2024 Barbados and Japan took part in the 8th Japan-CARICOM Ministerial-Level Conference during the event the nations discussed Barbados' climate-change mitigation plan known as the Bridgetown Initiative among other areas of interest including support areas of mutual interest at the Small Island Developing States body.

== Agreements ==
As of 2009, Barbadian and Japanese officials have been negotiating the details of a bilateral Double-Taxation Agreement (DTA) treaty.

== See also ==
- Foreign relations of Barbados
- Foreign relations of Japan
