= Barbados–Colombia relations =

- Barbados: Colombia

Diplomatic mission
- Embassy of Barbados in Caracas (Venezuela) (Note: Concurrent Embassy.) Honorary Consulate in Bogotá: Embassy of Colombia in Port of Spain (Trinidad and Tobago) (Note: Concurrent Embassy.)

Relations between Barbados and Colombia began on 1 February 1972, six years after the island country's independence. In addition, Barbados was the first country in the Lesser Antilles with which Colombia established relations, after Trinidad and Tobago. Both countries are members of Organization of American States and the Community of Latin American and Caribbean States.

== Colombian aid ==
Like other Caribbean countries, relations between Barbados and Colombia are based on the Caribbean Basin Cooperation Strategy that the Andean country provides to Barbados. The areas in which Colombian cooperation in Barbados is based are the following:

- Technical training: Through Colombia's technical training agency, Servicio Nacional de Aprendizaje, it has been carrying out projects in this field in Barbados since 2012. Among the most prominent trainings is through the institution in charge of trading the crafts of the native Colombian peoples. In addition, this same institution has approached the Caribbean country to create an agency of the same nature.
- Education: As in most countries, Colombia has brought the bilingualism programme to Barbados.
- Culture: Colombia's cultural industries programme has been brought to Barbados in order to develop this field on the island.
- Environment: This is another project that encompasses several Caribbean countries, and it aims to manage risk due to climate change.

== Agreements ==
In 1984, both countries signed a Technical and Scientific Cooperation Agreement, which will serve the Caribbean and Andean country. Similarly, in 2014, both countries agreed to establish an agreement on tax information, with this Barbados is removed from the list of tax havens.

== Drug trafficking ==
In terms of multilateral forums, Barbados and Colombia have strengthened their ties in the fight against the drug problem, since Barbados, like many Caribbean countries, serves as a platform for communication and export of cocaine to Africa, and also functions as a platform for money laundering. Barbados, unlike other Caribbean states, plays a prominent role because it is the headquarters of the United Nations Office on Drugs and Crime for the Caribbean and the European Commission for Drug Control.

== Diplomacy ==
Despite having established relations for almost 40 years, Barbados and Colombia do not have diplomatic representation, therefore, the Embassy of Barbados in Washington D.C. is in charge of diplomatic relations between the Caribbean country and Colombia, likewise, the Embassy of Colombia in Port of Spain performs the same functions for Barbados. As for consular relations, the consulates of each of the countries in the cities previously named are in charge of serving the citizens of the counterpart. Although, Barbados does have an Honorary Consulate in the city of Bogotá DC. As for rapprochements, in 2012, the Vice Minister of Foreign Affairs of Colombia, Mónica Lanzetta, visited Bridgetown. Likewise, the Vice Minister of Multilateral Affairs, Carlos Morales, did so in 2014. Both visits were with the purpose of strengthening ties and the aid in cooperation that Colombia provides to the Caribbean country.

== Trade ==
In 1994, CARICOM and Colombia signed a free trade agreement aimed at promoting trade and investment, cooperation and the creation of joint ventures.

The Caribbean country's main export item to the Andean country is chemical products, while Colombia's positive trade balance is due to its exports of mineral fuels.

Trade between Barbados and Colombia
Country	Exports ($USD)	Percentage (exports)	Percentage (imports)	Percentage (total)	Products
Barbados	$1 987 011	0.394%	0.024%	0.032%	chemicals, plastic products, clothing, salt and sulfur, wood products, beverages.
Colombia	$39 220 436	0.067%	0.003%	0.035%	mineral fuels, plastic products, wood products, sugar and confectionery, pharmaceutical products, chemical products.

Source: Trade Map

== See also ==
- Foreign relations of Barbados
- Foreign relations of Colombia
