= Nuala Lawlor =

Canadian diplomat

- Occupations: Diplomat, international development professional
- Employer: Government of Canada
- Known for: Human rights advocacy; diplomatic service in Africa, the Caribbean, and Latin America
- Children: 2

Nuala Lawlor is a Canadian diplomat and international development professional.

== Professional career ==
Lawlor is the coordinator for the Canada Fund for Local Initiatives (CFLI) with a focus on inclusive governance and access to justice in East Africa (Kenya, Uganda, and Somalia). She served as the country coordinator for United Nations Volunteers in English and Dutch-speaking Caribbean, based in Barbados. As a diplomat, she served in Sudan as the acting chargé d'affaires in 2007 and also in South Africa as the trade commissioner from the high commissioner of Canada. In her diplomat role, she was deployed in Venezuela, Ghana, and Peru.

== Controversy ==
During her diplomatic mission in Sudan, Lawlor was ordered to leave the country within 72 hours for standing up for human rights and the rule of law. She was declared persona non grata after being accused of political interference. A spokesman for the department in Ottawa addressed the issue and said that "she was standing up for human rights and the rule of law in Sudan, in the finest tradition of Canadian diplomacy".

== Personal life ==
Lawlor is a mother and wife with an interest in journalism. She loves fashion, travel, travel-planning and writing.

== See also ==
- Foreign relations of Barbados
- Barbados–Nigeria relations
