= Cuthbert Edwy Talma =

Barbadian politician

Sir Cuthbert Edwy Talma KA

2nd Deputy Prime Minister of Barbados
- In office 10 September 1971 – 2 September 1976
- Prime Minister: Errol Barrow
- Preceded by: James Cameron Tudor
- Succeeded by: Harold Bernard St. John

Personal details
- Born: 22 December 1909 British Windward Islands (now Grenada)
- Died: 5 August 1994 (aged 84) Barbados

Sir Cuthbert Edwy Talma, KA (22 December 1909 – 5 August 1994) was a Barbadian politician who served as the 2nd Deputy Prime Minister of Barbados from 10 September 1971 to 2 September 1976 under the Errol Barrow administration. He also served in the first ministerial government under Premier Grantley Herbert Adams where he held the post of Minister of Agriculture, Lands and Fisheries from 1954 to 1956 and from 1961 to 1963. Initially he was part of the Barbados Labour Party but left in 1957 for the newly formed Democratic Labour Party.
