= Guy Hewitt =

High Commissioner of Barbados in London

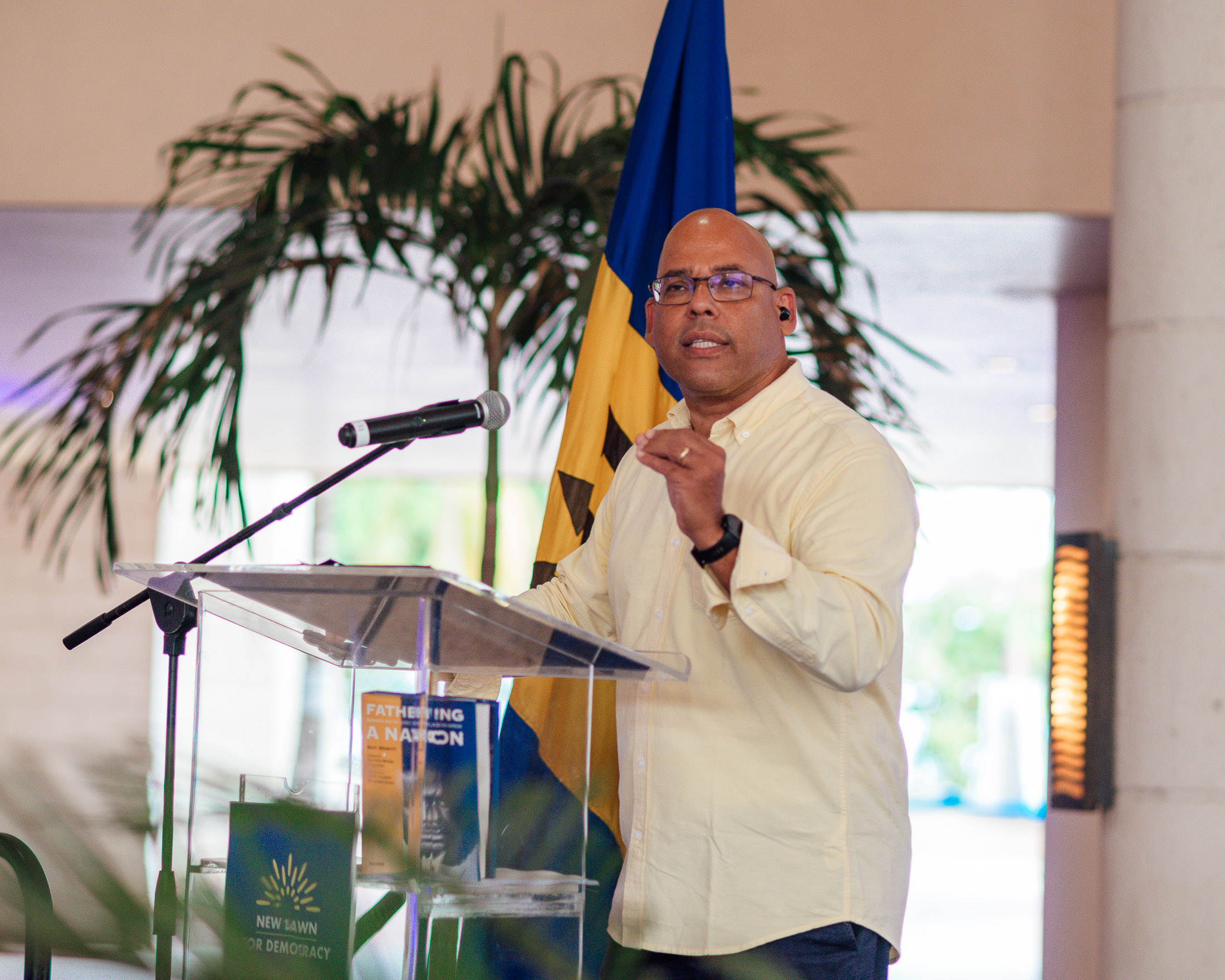
Democracy in Barbados

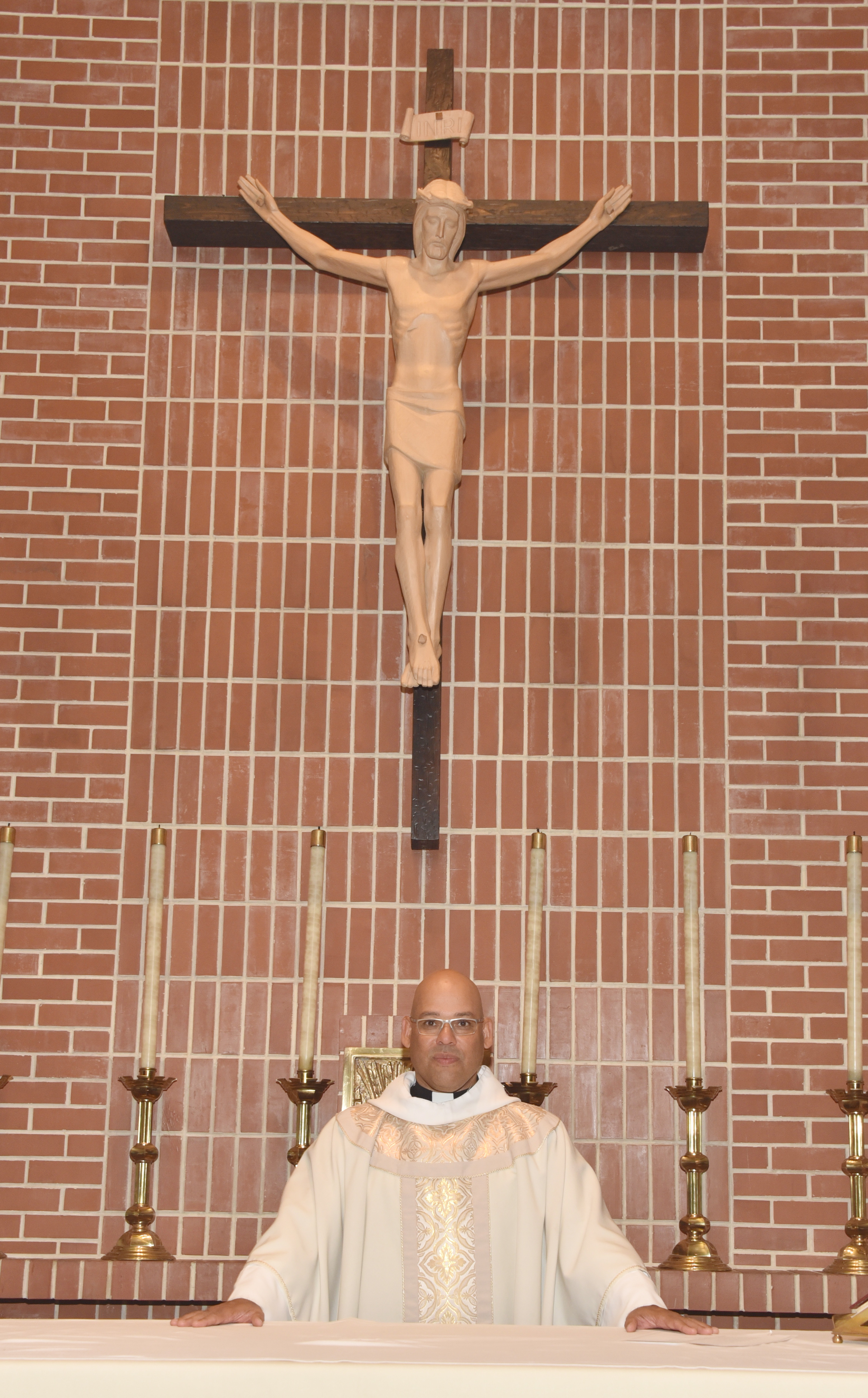
Pastoring in Florida

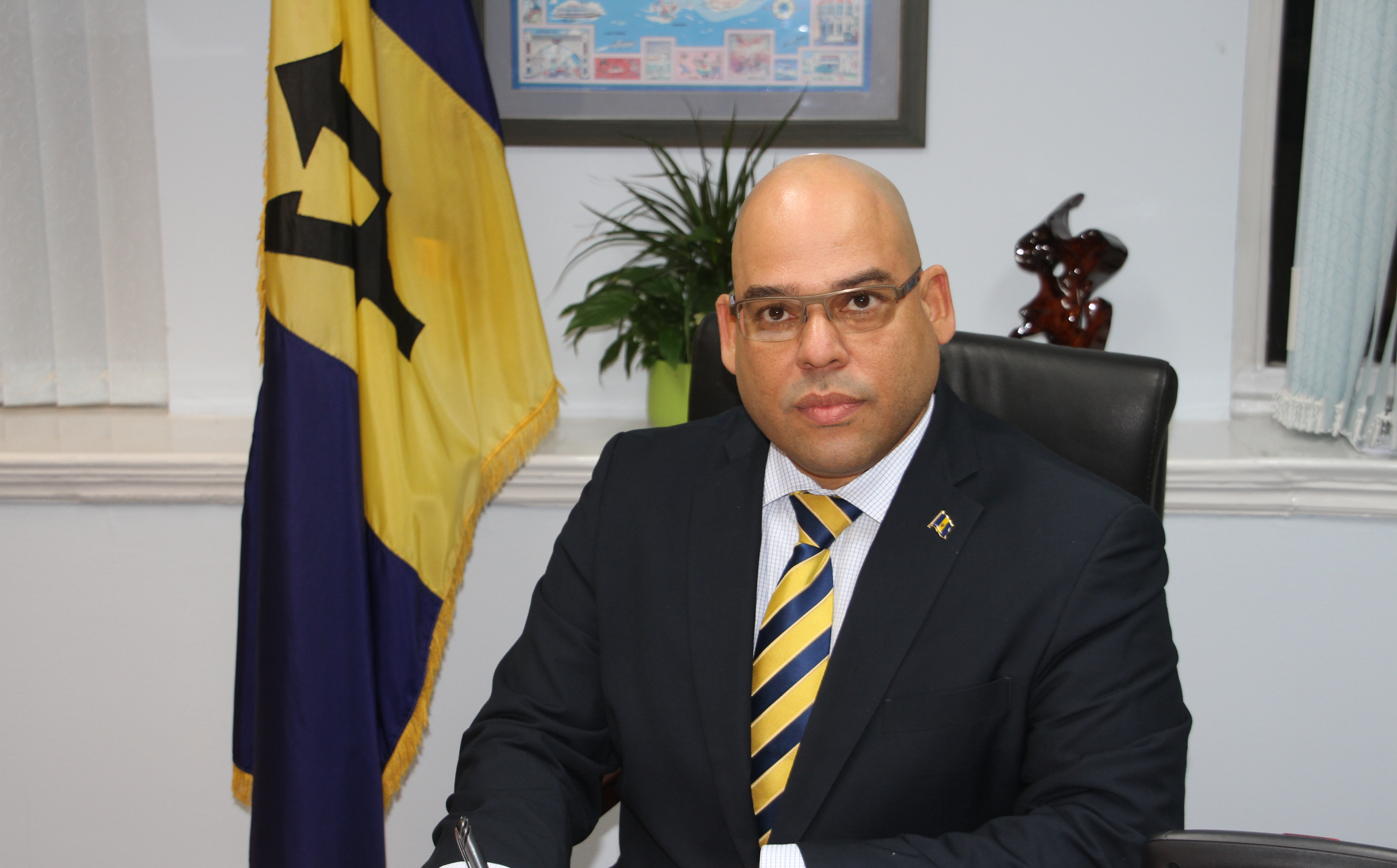
Diplomat in London

Guy Arlington Kenneth Hewitt (born November 1967) is a Barbadian British Anglican priest, racial justice and diversity, equity, and inclusion advocate, and specialist in social policy and development. He held the ambassadorial appointment of High Commissioner of Barbados in London from 2014 to 2018. He previously worked with the University of the West Indies, Caribbean Policy Development Centre, Commonwealth of Nations, Caribbean Community, and the City and Guilds of London Institute.

== International Relations Assignments ==
In addition to his assignment to the Court of St James, Hewitt was the Permanent Representative to the UN International Maritime Organization, and a Governor on the Board of the Commonwealth Secretariat. He has been a strong advocate for the Commonwealth of Nations and Small Island Developing States (SIDS) particularly for a change in the OECD Development Assistance Committee rules to allow Caribbean and other SIDS to access development financing when devastated by catastrophic storm systems.

In 2018, he was one of the leading advocates on the Windrush scandal, in which he criticised the outcomes of the immigration policies of the British government on undocumented, elderly, West Indian-born, long-term UK residents which included the denial of the right to work, denial of benefits, denial of healthcare and also for some detention and deportation. He published articles with Chatham House and the University of the West Indies on the Windrush scandal in which he outlines the strategy adopted to make the Windrush scandal a national concern and global issue and bring about a major policy u-turn. Hewitt's agitation was included in the podcast series "100 Campaigns that Changed the World".

He has published a number of books. In 2016, to celebrate Barbados' Fiftieth Anniversary of Independence he published Fathering A Nation on the life and legacy of Errol Barrow, the first Prime Minister of Barbados and one of the Barbadian National Heroes. He previous wrote extensively on gender-responsive national budgets.

On 11 June 2021, Hewitt sought the presidency of the Democratic Labour Party, the organisation co-founded by Errol Barrow that led Barbados into Independence and enacted many of its social and economic reforms. He remains committed to Barbados. Hewitt supported the Barbadian government's decision to separate itself from the British monarchy as part of a journey of self-determination. He noted this transition to a republic, having a local citizen as head of state, had long been planned but the Windrush scandal altered perceptions of the "mother country". However, he was critical of how the administration in Barbados handled the process of constitutional change to a republic.

To celebrate the Platinum Jubilee of Elizabeth II, Hewitt was engaged by the media to speak to her role as Head of the Commonwealth. He underscored her pivotal role in keeping this "Family of Nations" together through her understanding that the modern Commonwealth as a multiracial and multinational association, and unlike many other European leaders in the post-colonial era, avoided redundant ideas of imperial loyalty or Anglo-Saxon (European) superiority. He subsequently paid tribute to her Commonwealth role on her death.

== Faith-based Roles ==
As an Anglican priest has ministered in Barbados and the wider Caribbean, North America and Europe. In 2019, Hewitt became the parish priest at St. James-in-the-Hills Episcopal Church, in the Episcopal Diocese of Southeast Florida. As with the Windrush scandal, Hewitt was active in the US on racial justice issues. His articles "Let Freedom Ring" and "No Justice, No Peace: A Christian Sociological Reflection on Race in the USA" were featured in the Episcopal Journal. He prepared a liturgy on Black Lives Matter for Lent and collaborated on a liturgy for Juneteenth.

After three years of ministering in Florida, Hewitt returned to London, the land of his birth, and subsequently took up the position of Associate Vicar at All Saints Church, Fulham in the Diocese of London. In August 2022, he was appointed as the Church of England's first Racial Justice Director. Located within the Archbishops' Council and reporting to the Secretary General, he will work alongside the Archbishops' Commission for Racial Justice to ensure the taskforce recommendations From Lament to Action and the work of the Commission are implemented.

2023 is a significant year for the UK including global-majority heritage (GMH) communities given the Coronation of a King, who has proclaimed that the nation's diversity is its greatest strength, the 75th anniversary of the arrival of the Empire Windrush, the symbol of modern, diverse Britain, and the 30th anniversary of the racist murder of Stephen Lawrence. To honour the life and legacy of Stephen Lawrence, Hewitt called for the healing of Britain's gaping wound of racism.
