= Barbados–Nigeria relations =

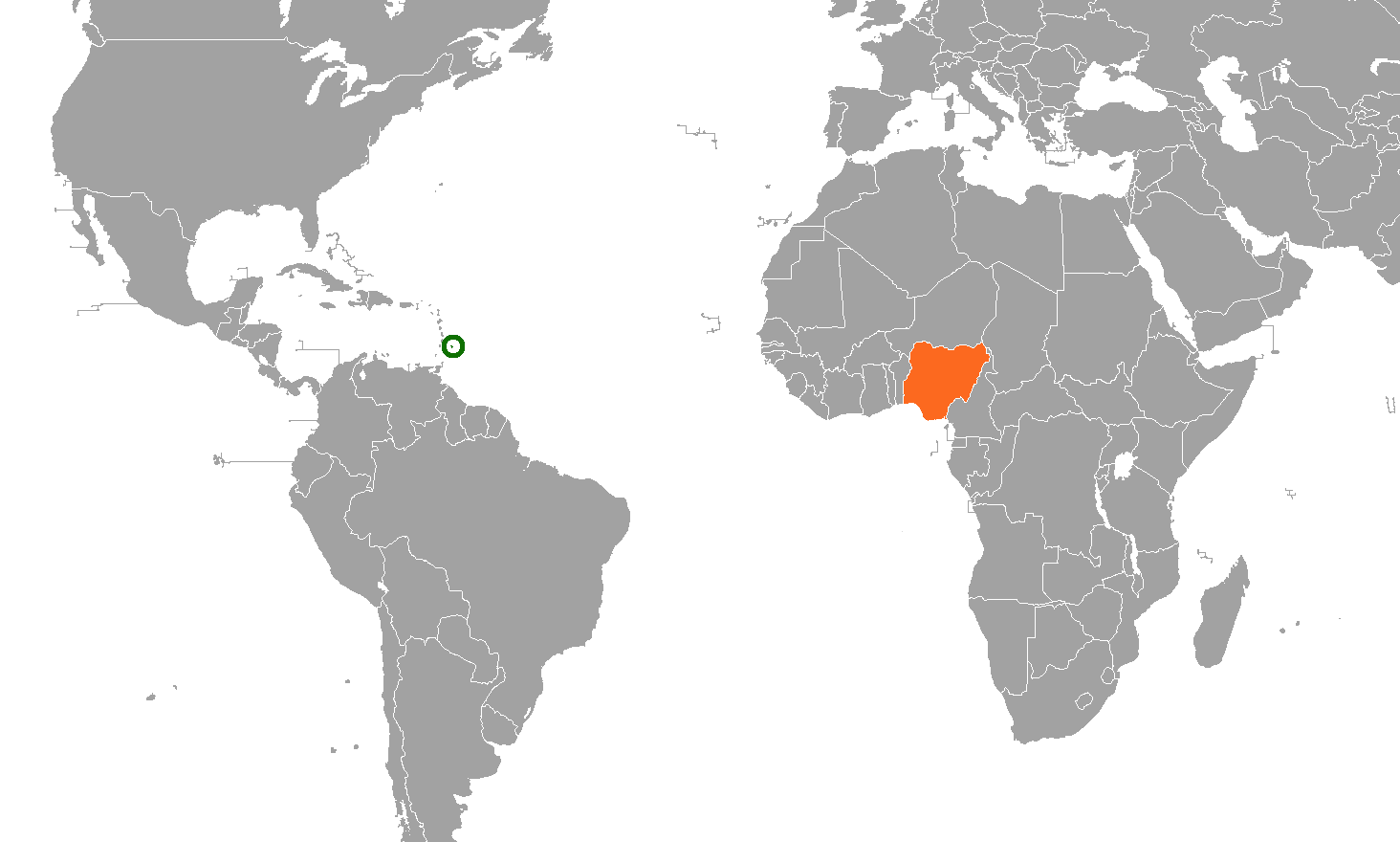

- Barbados: Nigeria

Barbados–Nigeria relations are foreign relations between Barbados and Nigeria. Barbados and Nigeria formally established diplomatic relations on 24 April 1970. Nigeria is accredited to Barbados from its high commission in Port of Spain, (Trinidad and Tobago). On 4 December 2025 Ms. Juliette Bynoe-Sutherland, was sworn in as the Barbadian High Commissioner to Nigeria via Ghana.

== History ==
In 1966 Nigeria was one of fifteen states which took part in U.N. Security Council resolution 230 which admitted Barbados into the United Nations.

In 2006 the Governor Otunba Gbenga Daniel of the Nigerian state of Ogun announced that Barbadians would be given free land if they wished to move to Nigeria. Nigeria has pushed for more investment from Barbadian companies and investors and in 2008 for the establishment of direct flights between both nations.

In 2006 Barbadian solar company Aqua Sol Components Ltd. formed a 50-50 joint venture partnership with the Nigerian state of Akwa Ibom. The partnership makes use of Barbados' experience with solar energy given its high usage of solar hot water heaters across the island. Through the venture, Akwa Ibom hopes to raise the level of solar usage in Nigeria. The deal was facilitated through Commission for Pan-African Affairs within the Barbados Prime Minister's office.

In 2007 the Barbadian cultural ambassador who goes by the sobriquet "The Mighty Gabby" was named a Nigerian chief in a service at the Sons of God Apostolic Spiritual Baptist Church in Ealing Grove, Christ Church, Barbados. Gabby, who had recently visited Nigeria, was given the name Omowale, which means "our son has returned". The service was also to coincide with the United Nations designated Black Civilisation Day.

In 2019 the governments of Barbados and the Federal government of Nigeria signed visa waiver agreements to facilitate ease of travel between their nations. A follow-up meeting between the Caribbean Heads of Government in CARICOM and African Union nations was planned for July 2020 however, that summit had been suspended due to the COVID-19 pandemic.

In 2021, the Central Bank of Nigeria (CBN) formed a partnership with the Barbados-based FINTECH firm Bitt Inc. to develop an e-Naira cryptocurrency to be used in Nigeria.

In November 2025 the government of Nigeria and Barbados announced a Memorandum of Understanding (MoU) for joint pharmaceutical partnership between both governments, with emphasis on proposed partnership between CARICOM–LATAM, ECOWAS and the AfCFTA partners.

== Bilateral agreements ==
Date	Agreement name	ref. number	Note
13 July 1981	Air Services	No. 3196 (1981)	

== Resident diplomatic missions ==
- Barbados is accredited to Nigeria from its high commission in Accra, Ghana.
- Nigeria is accredited to Barbados from its high commission in Port of Spain, Trinidad and Tobago.

== See also ==
- Foreign relations of Barbados
- Foreign relations of Nigeria
