= Barbados–Suriname relations =

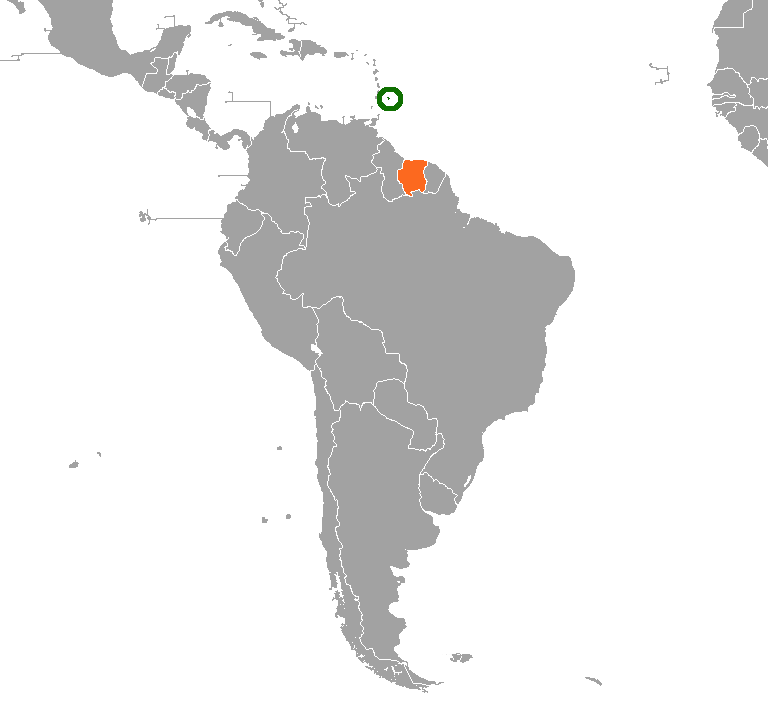
- Barbados: Suriname

Barbadian–Surinamese relations are diplomatic relations between Barbados and Suriname. Both countries established diplomatic relations on 7 February 1977. Neither country has a resident ambassador. Barbados is accredited to Suriname from Bridgetown. Suriname is represented in Barbados through its embassy in Port of Spain, (Trinidad and Tobago).

== Early history ==
In 1650, the governor of Barbados Francis Willoughby, 5th Baron Willoughby of Parham sent a ship to establish a colonial settlement in Surinam. Lord Willoughby later visited the colony, to assist with its development. Fort Willoughby, under the command of Governor Lieutenant-General William Byam, was captured by Dutchmen from the State of Zeeland under the command of Abraham Crijnssen on 27 February 1667 after a 3-hour fight. The Dutch changed the name of Fort Willoughby to Fort Zeelandia and established Dutch control over the whole colony.

== Bilateral relations ==
On 17 February 2005 the leaders of Barbados and Suriname signed the "Agreement for the deepening of bilateral cooperation between the Government of Barbados and the Government of the Republic of Suriname, Mia Mottley the new Prime Minister of Barbados recently paid the Republic of Suriname a three day visit which took place on November 14th through to the 16th 2020."

On 23–24 April 2009 both nations formed a Joint Commission in Paramaribo, Suriname to improve relations between both countries and to expand into various areas of cooperation. Since the first meeting a second one was held on 3–4 March 2011 in Dover, Barbados. At the second meeting several areas of mutual interest were reviewed including: agriculture, trade, investment, as well as international transport, entertainment, culture and tourism.

== Trade ==
Trade between both nations is in Suriname's favour due to Barbados importation of Suriname's Bunker 'C' grade fuel oil. Because of the importance of natural resources, both governments discussed their overlapping maritime boundaries in 2007.

== See also ==
- Foreign relations of Barbados
- Foreign relations of Suriname
