= Barbados–Germany relations =

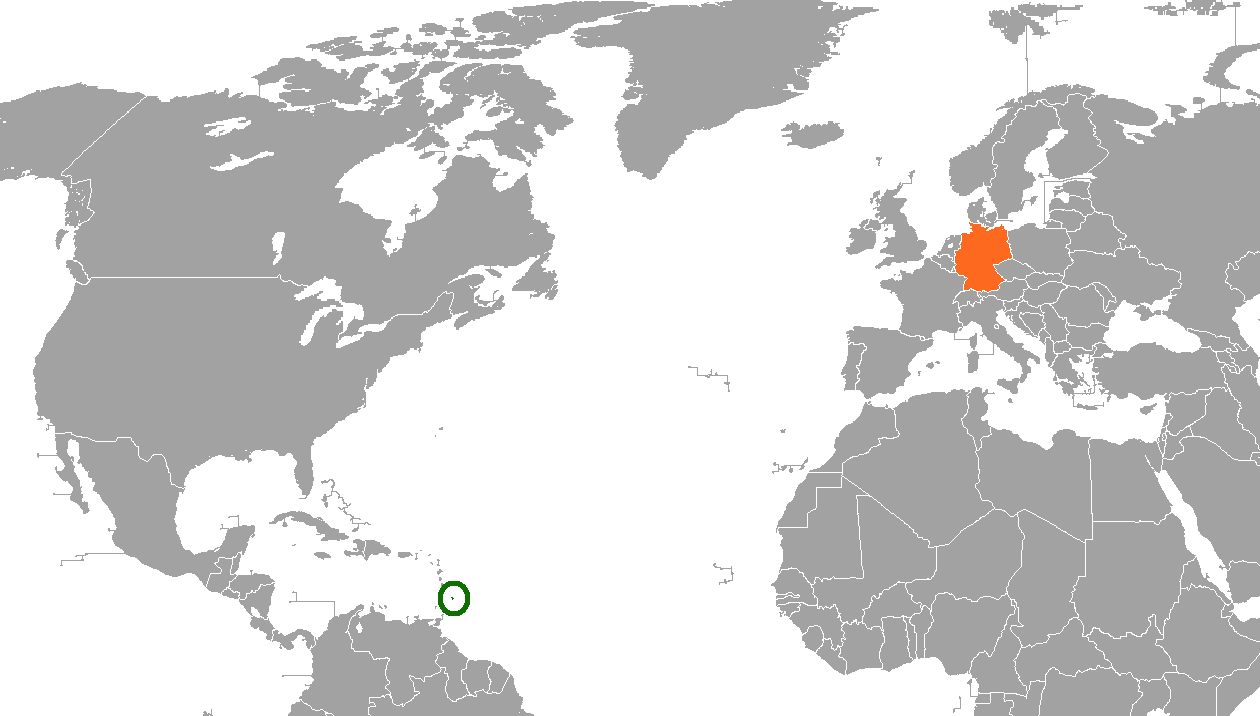

- Barbados: Germany

Barbados–Germany relations are the bilateral relations between Barbados and Germany. Barbados is represented in Germany through its embassy in Brussels (Belgium) and Germany is represented in Barbados from its regional embassy for the Eastern Caribbean in Port of Spain (Trinidad and Tobago) and an Honorary Consul in Christ Church. Barbados and Germany formally established diplomatic relations on 14 March 1967.

== History ==
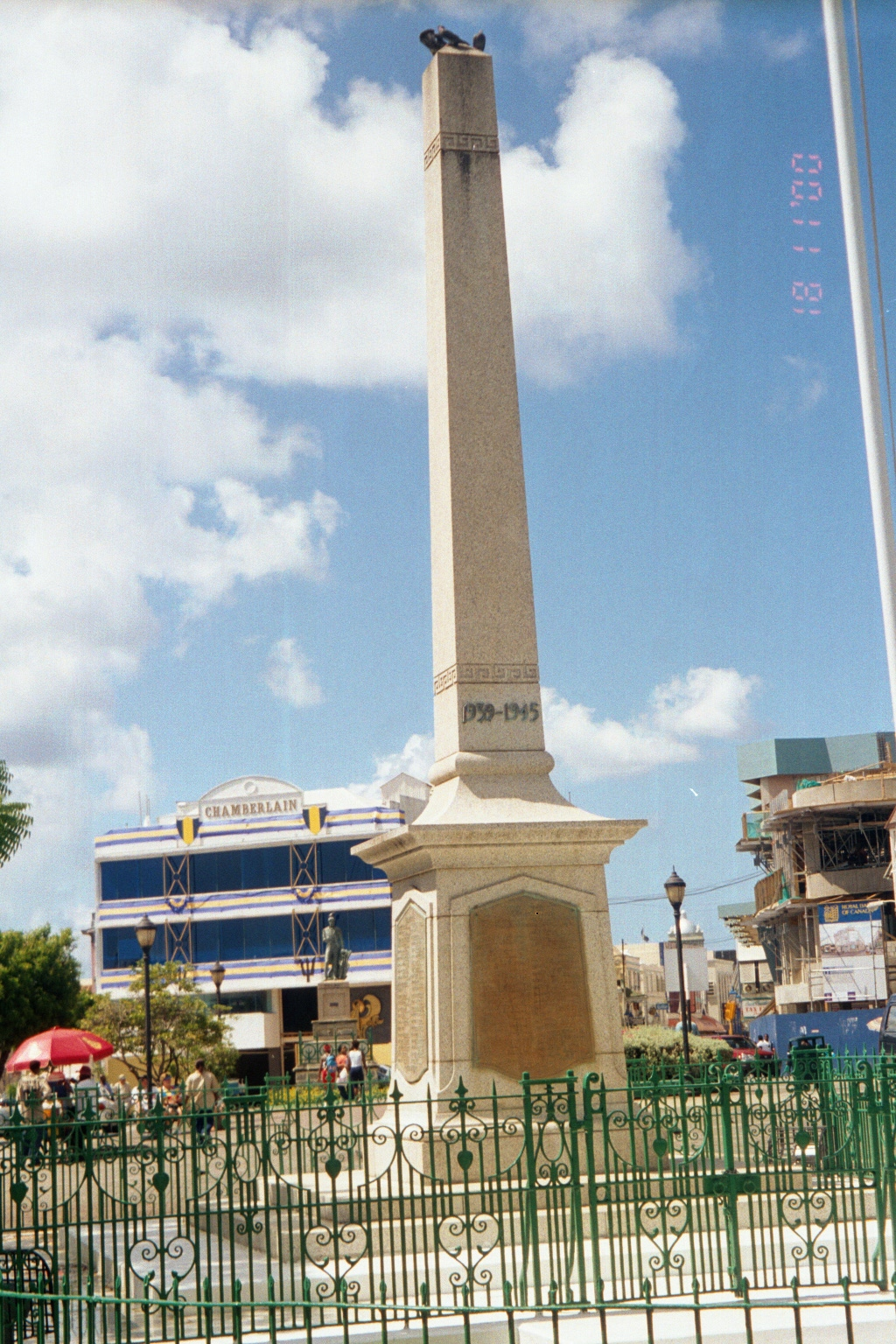
The Cenotaph War Memorial at National Heroes' Square in Bridgetown

From the late 1620s until 1966, Barbados constituted as a part of the British Empire and was a prominent regional base for British forces. In 1874, the German bark Pierre Buyper was wrecked on the coast of Barbados. During World War I and II a number of Barbadian troops were enlisted with the British forces to fight in the war with Germany. Twelve Barbados men made up the Second Barbados Contingent of Volunteers for the Armed Forces. They were recruited for the Royal Air Force. They left Barbados for England in November 1940 to fight against Germany. On 11 September 1942 German submarine U-514 was patrolling the waters of Barbados where it torpedoed the Canadian steam merchant ship Cornwallis off the coastline of the capital city. The ship was brought ashore in Barbados before it was released and torpedoed a second time and sank. The shipwreck was later turned into a reef and Marine park.

== Economic relations ==
According to prize winning Barbadian novelist Austin Clarke, Barbados suffered economic hardship after it was nearly cut off from global trade by Germany.

Barbadian and German economic trade are not very significant, the German government is one of the main stakeholders in the Barbados-based Caribbean Development Bank (CDB), which lends to the various territories throughout the Caribbean region.

In 2008, Barbados was one of several Caribbean countries of the Group of African, Caribbean and Pacific countries that signed a sweeping Economic Partnership Agreement with the European Union.

Barbados receives substantial income from Germany from the spending by German tourists. In 2002 German tourism to Barbados dropped by 23 percent. Barbados's main exports to Germany are agricultural products. Banks Barbados Brewery in Barbados imported over 1 million Barbadian dollars of computerized production equipment from Germany in 1994–1995.

== Tourism ==
Germans nationals travelling to Barbados for tourism remains one of the modern day cultural ties between both nations. In 2010, the German airline Condor announced to Barbadian aviation officials that it would be doubling its weekly flights between Barbados and Germany.

== Agreements ==
- The Agreement between the Government of Barbados and the Government of the Federal Republic of Germany for the Reciprocal Promotion and Protection of Investments — Bilateral Investment Treaty (BIT), was signed 2 December 1994.
- Short-stay visa waver agreement (for stays up to three months), covering Barbadian and German nationals, signed and entered force on 28 May 2009.
- Members of the African, Caribbean and Pacific–EU's Joint Parliamentary Assembly.

== People ==
- Rupee (musician) is a soca musician from Barbados. He was born in military barracks in Germany to a German mother and a Bajan father, who was serving in the British armed forces at the time. He later migrated to Barbados. Female Barbadian reggae singer Tabitha Johnson was also born in Germany and she was born to a German mother and a Bajan father just like Rupee (musician) was. Around 160 Barbadian Emigrants live in Germany.

== See also ==
- Foreign relations of Barbados
- Foreign relations of Germany
