= François Jackman =

Barbadian diplomat

Permanent Representative of Barbados to the United Nations in New York
- Incumbent
- Assumed office 1 May 2021
- President: Sandra Mason
- Preceded by: Henrietta Elizabeth Thompson

François Ayodele Jackman is a Barbadian diplomat who has served as the Permanent Representative of Barbados to the United Nations in New York since May 2021.

He has served in diplomatic roles since 1995, notably representing CARICOM at the UN.

He served as a counselor in the Barbadian embassy in Beijing from 2009 to 2014 and was co-director of the Confucian Institute at the University of the West Indies in Barbados, which instructs on subjects like Chinese language and culture. He served as Ambassador to China from 2018 until his UN appointment in 2021. He has a Master's degree in international boundary studies from Durham University and a Bachelor's from the London School of Economics.
