= Edwin Pollard =

High Commissioner of Barbados in London (born 1942)

Lawrence Edwin Pollard OBE (born 21 May 1942) was High Commissioner of Barbados in London 2003 until 2008.

Pollard joined Barclays Bank, and served it as Staff and Industrial Relations Manager, Assistant Caribbean Director, Personal Sector and Offshore Director and Product Development and Marketing Director. He was a member of the board of the Barbados Institute Banking and Finance, the Securities Exchange of Barbados and FCIB.
