= List of diplomatic missions in Barbados =

The capital city of Bridgetown in Barbados and its immediate environs hosts 11 high commissions or embassies, a Delegation of the European Union, and an Eastern Caribbean mission of the United Nations. Several other countries have honorary consuls to provide emergency services to their citizens.

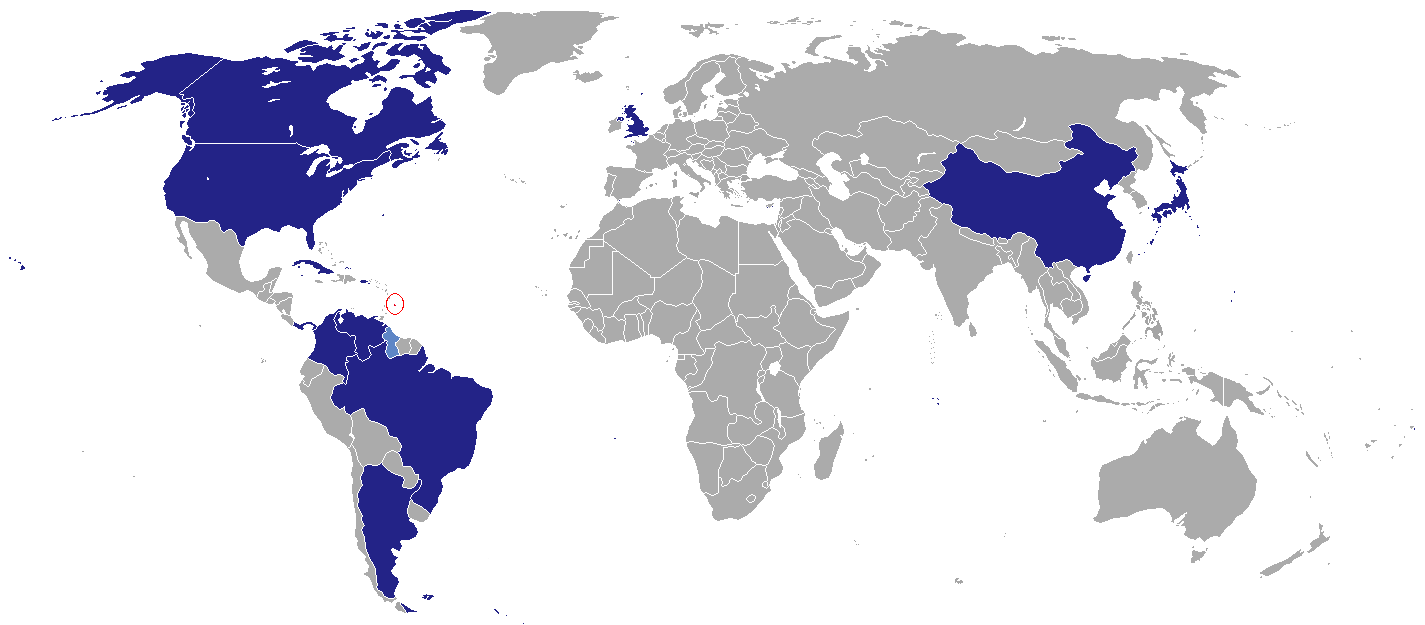
Diplomatic missions in Barbados

== Embassies/High Commissions in Bridgetown ==
Entries marked with an asterisk (*) are member-states of the Commonwealth of Nations. As such, their embassies are formally termed as high commissions.

Country	Address	Image	Website
Argentina	Lucerne Building, Hastings, Christ Church (BB 15156)		
Brazil	"Hy Brasil" The Courtyard, Hastings, Christ Church (BB 15156)		
Canada*	Bishop's Court Hill, St. Michael (BB 11000)		
China	17 Golf View Terrace, Rockley, Christ Church		
Colombia			
Cuba	No. 13 Edgehill Heights, Phase 2, St. Thomas		
Japan	Building #2, Ground Fl., Chelston Park, Lower Collymore Rock, St. Michael		
Panama	Aastra House, St Matthias Gap, Hastings, Christ Church.		
United Kingdom*	Lower Collymore Rock, St. Michael (BB 11000)		
United States	Wildey Business Park, St. Michael (BB 14006)		
Venezuela	Coconut Walk, Hastings, Christ Church		

== Other missions or delegations in Bridgetown ==
- African Export–Import Bank
- European Union Delegation to Barbados, the Eastern Caribbean States, the OESC and CARICOM/CARIFORUM, Hastings (Christ Church)
- United Nations Eastern Caribbean office at Marine Gardens, Hastings (Christ Church)

- Food and Agriculture Organization of the United Nations (FAO)
- International Telecommunication Union (ITU)
- Interpol
- Pan American Health Organization (PAHO) / World Health Organization (WHO)
- UN Women
- United Nations Development Programme (UNDP)
- United Nations Fund for Population Activities (UNFPA)
- United Nations International Children's Emergency Fund (UNICEF)
- United Nations Office for Project Services (UNOPS)
- United Nations World Food Programme (WFP)

== Gallery ==
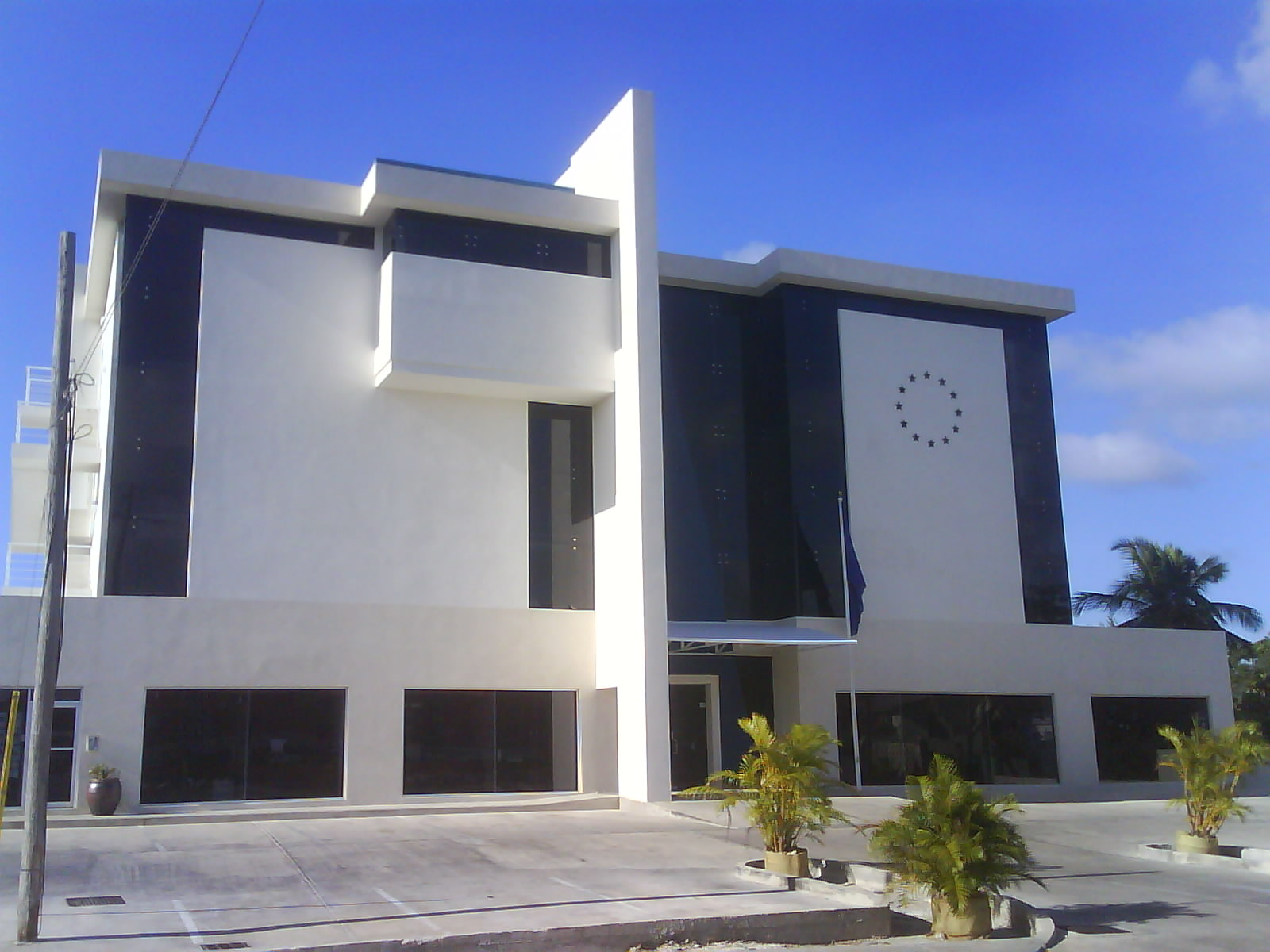
European Union Delegation

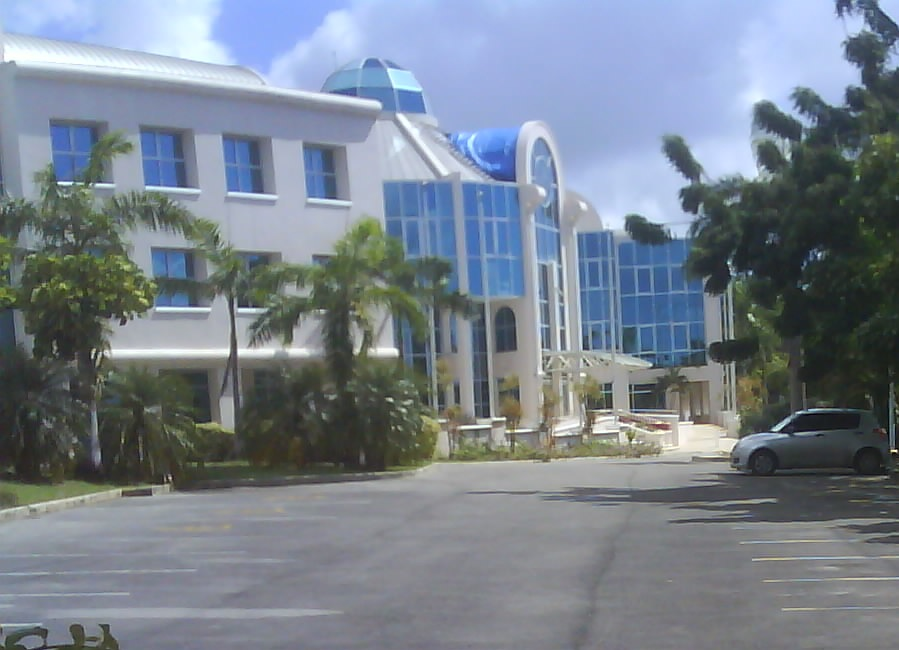
United Nations House - Eastern Caribbean office

== Consulate General in Bridgetown ==
- Guyana

== Non-resident embassies/high commissions accredited to Barbados ==
Resident in Caracas, Venezuela:

- Algeria
- Bolivia
- Czech Republic
- Dominican Republic
- Finland
- Iran
- Italy
- Malaysia
- Poland
- Portugal
- Qatar
- Switzerland
- Saudi Arabia
- Uruguay
- Vietnam

Resident in Havana, Cuba:

- Egypt
- Ghana
- Kenya
- Libya
- North Korea
- Romania
- Slovakia

Resident in New York City, United States of America:

- Ecuador
- Eswatini
- Guinea
- Iceland
- Maldives
- Namibia
- Rwanda
- Sierra Leone
- Senegal
- Tajikistan
- Turkmenistan

Resident in Port-of-Spain, Trinidad and Tobago:

- Australia
- Chile
- Germany
- Ghana
- Guatemala
- Holy See
- Jamaica
- Netherlands
- Nigeria
- Peru
- South Korea
- Spain
- Suriname
- Trinidad and Tobago
- Turkey

Resident in Washington, D.C., United States of America:

- Cyprus
- Ireland
- Israel
- Jordan
- Mauritius
- Philippines
- Serbia
- Singapore
- Sudan
- Tunisia
- Uganda

Resident elsewhere:

- Austria (Bogotá)
- Bahamas (Nassau)
- Bangladesh (Ottawa)
- Belgium (Kingston)
- Denmark (Mexico City)
- France (Castries)
- Greece (Panama City)
- Haiti (Kingston)
- India (Paramaribo)
- Indonesia (Bogotá)
- Mexico (Castries)
- Norway (Oslo)
- Russia (Georgetown)
- South Africa (Kingston)
- Thailand (Ottawa)
- Tanzania (Brasília)
- United Arab Emirates (Bogotá)
- Zambia (Ottawa)

== Former missions ==
- Australia (Unknown–2004) (Note: Resident in Port-of-Spain, Trinidad and Tobago)
- New Zealand (2021)
- Republic of China (Taiwan) (1968–1977)
- South Korea (Closed in 1989)
- Trinidad and Tobago (Closed in 1995)

== See also ==
- Apostolic Nunciature to Barbados
- List of ambassadors and high commissioners to and from Barbados
- Foreign relations of Barbados
- Visa requirements for Barbadian citizens
- List of diplomatic missions of Barbados
