= June Yvonne Clarke =

Barbadian diplomat

Barbados Ambassador to Canada
- In office 1996–1999

Barbados Ambassador to United Nations
- In office 1999–2004
- Preceded by: Carlston Belfield Boucher
- Succeeded by: Christopher Fitzherbert Hackett

Personal details
- Born: March 21, 1935 (age 91) Barbados
- Occupation: Diplomat

June Yvonne Clarke (born March 21, 1935, in Barbados) is a Barbadian diplomat. She was the High Commissioner of Barbados to Canada from 1996 until 1999 and Permanent Representative of Barbados to the United Nations in New York from 1999 until 2004. In 1998, Clarke became the Non-Resident High Commissioner of Barbados to New Zealand.

From 2002-03, she was Vice-President of the General Assembly of the United Nations.

== Biography ==
Clarke attended Queen's College (Barbados). Clarke was Chief Executive Officer of Women and Development Ltd. before becoming High Commissioner to New Zealand after had a career in life insurance.
