= Milton Inniss =

Barbados diplomat

Milton Inniss, FRICS, has been the High Commissioner of Barbados in London since October 2018.

Inniss was educated at the University of Reading. He worked in the construction industry for 34 years. In August 2018, the Government of Barbados identified him as a potential diplomat.
