= James Cameron Tudor =

Barbadian politician

Sir James Cameron Tudor KCMG

2nd Deputy Premier of Barbados
- In office 1965 – November 30, 1966
- Preceded by: Wynter Crawford
- Succeeded by: Office Abolished

1st Deputy Prime Minister of Barbados
- In office 30 November 1966 – 9 September 1971
- Prime Minister: Errol Barrow
- Preceded by: Office Established
- Succeeded by: Cuthbert Edwy Talma

Personal details
- Born: 18 October 1919 St. Michael, Barbados
- Died: 9 June 1995 (aged 75) Bridgetown, Barbados
- Occupation: Politician

Sir James Cameron Tudor, KCMG (18 October 1919 – 9 July 1995) was a Barbadian politician and diplomat, who was a founding member of the country's Democratic Labour Party in 1955. He served on the first Provisional General Council and as the first General Secretary. He served as the first Deputy Prime Minister of Barbados (and previously the only deputy premier of colonial-era Barbados), education minister, high commissioner to Britain, and United Nations ambassador, and was elected to both houses of the national legislature. He also worked as a broadcaster, lecturer and journalist.

Tudor was made a Companion of the Order of St Michael and St George in the 1970 New Year Honours, and was promoted to a Knight Commander of the Order in the 1987 list.

== Background ==
Born in St. Michael, Barbados in 1919, Tudor was educated at Harrison College, Barbados, and at Keble College, Oxford, where in 1942 he became the first Black person elected president of the Oxford Union. After receiving a master's degree in history and politics in 1944, he returned to Barbados and taught at Combermere School (1946–48) and in British Guiana at Queens School (1948–51).

He was elected to the Barbados House of Assembly in 1951. He was a founding member in 1955 of the Democratic Labour Party, which assumed power in 1961 and led the former British colony to independence in 1966.

He served as Deputy Prime Minister, twice served as Foreign Minister of Barbados (1971–72, 1986–1989), Education Minister (1961–67), as Barbados' High Commissioner to the United Kingdom (1972–75), and High Commissioner to Canada (1990–1992), and was the Permanent Representative to the United Nations (1976–1979).

He died in hospital in Bridgetown, Barbados, aged 75, following a heart attack.
