= High Commission of Barbados, Ottawa =

Diplomatic mission of Barbados in Canada

Coordinates: 45.4222°N 75.6962°W

High Commission of Barbados in Ottawa
- Location: 55 Metcalfe Street; Suite 470; Ottawa, Ontario; K1P 6L5
- High Commissioner: Mr. E. Evelyn Greaves

The High Commission of Barbados in Ottawa (French: Haut-commissariat de la Barbade à Ottawa) is the primary diplomatic mission of Barbados in Canada. Among the initial diplomatic missions to be established by Barbados after the attainment of independence from Britain, the office is located in Downtown Ottawa, Ontario at 55 Metcalfe Street in Suite 470. The High Commission is located three blocks from Parliament Hill, seat of the national legislature of Canada, on the corner Metcalfe and Queen Streets. The High Commission to Ottawa is further supported by a Consul General in the city of Toronto. The official residence of the Barbadian High Commissioner to Ottawa is located on the edge of Rockcliffe Park at #368 Lisgar Road.

The Barbadian High Commission presently ranks 14th on Canadian Government's "Ambassadors by Order of Precedence" list.

Initially the Office of the Barbados High Commission was established in June 1967 at: 151 Slater Street, Suite 200. It remained for a number of years before relocating.

== Activities ==
The High Commission provides business and consular services to residents and visitors associated with Barbados. It further represents the Government of Barbados in many areas including helping to facilitate the Seasonal Agricultural Workers Program in Canada. In years past it collaborated with various institutions in Canada including: the National Council of Barbadian Associations of Canada Inc. (NCBAC), the Barbados (Ottawa) Association Inc., and the Barbados Family & Friends Club. As of 26 July 2008 E. Evelyn Greaves is the resident Barbados government representative and High Commissioner to Canada, having succeeded Glyne Samuel Hyvesta Murray.

In 1989 the Barbados High Commission then under High Commissioner established the annual Errol Barrow Memorial Trust of Canada which awards worthy Canadians with educational scholarships. The 2013 fundraiser dinner and awards was hosted at the Ottawa City Hall.

=== Sponsorships ===
The High Commission is also one of the sponsors of the Black Canadian Scholarship Fund (BCSF), and the Ottawa Seniors Organization.

The High Commissioner has participated in a number of community events in Ottawa including a major fund raising campaign for the Queensway Carleton Hospital Care Grows West expansion-project for which over CAD$5 million was raised.

=== Publications ===
- Greaves, Edward Evelyn (2010). Sandiford, Dr. Keith (ed.). Some Barbadian-Canadians A Biographical Dictionary. Barbados High Commission. Archived from the original on 2011-03-01.

== Past High Commissioners ==
- Victor Leroy Johnson (October 31, 1999 – )
- Glyne Samuel H. Murray (October 18, 2003 – 2008)
- June Yvonne Clarke (1996 – 1999)
- C.B. "Monty" Williams
- Hafford Philmore Brazane Babb
- Lester Eversley Whitehead (1982 – 1986)
- Oliver Jackman 1971 – 1975

== Accreditation(s) ==
The Barbadian High Commissioner in Ottawa is also concurrently accredited as non-resident High Commissioner to: Australia and New Zealand.

== Past addresses ==
- 130 Albert Street, Suite 600

== See also ==
- Barbados–Canada relations
- Barbadian diplomatic missions
- Canadian High Commission in Barbados
- List of embassies and high commissions in Ottawa
- List of ambassadors and high commissioners to Canada
