= Hugh Arthur =

Barbadian politician

Hugh Anthony Victor Arthur, OBE (born Bridgetown, Barbados 1945) was High Commissioner of Barbados in London from 2008 until 2013.

Arthur was educated at Trent University and the University of Surrey. Arthur spent many years with the Barbados Tourist Board. He was also a lecturer in Tourism at the University of the West Indies.
