= List of diplomatic missions of Barbados =

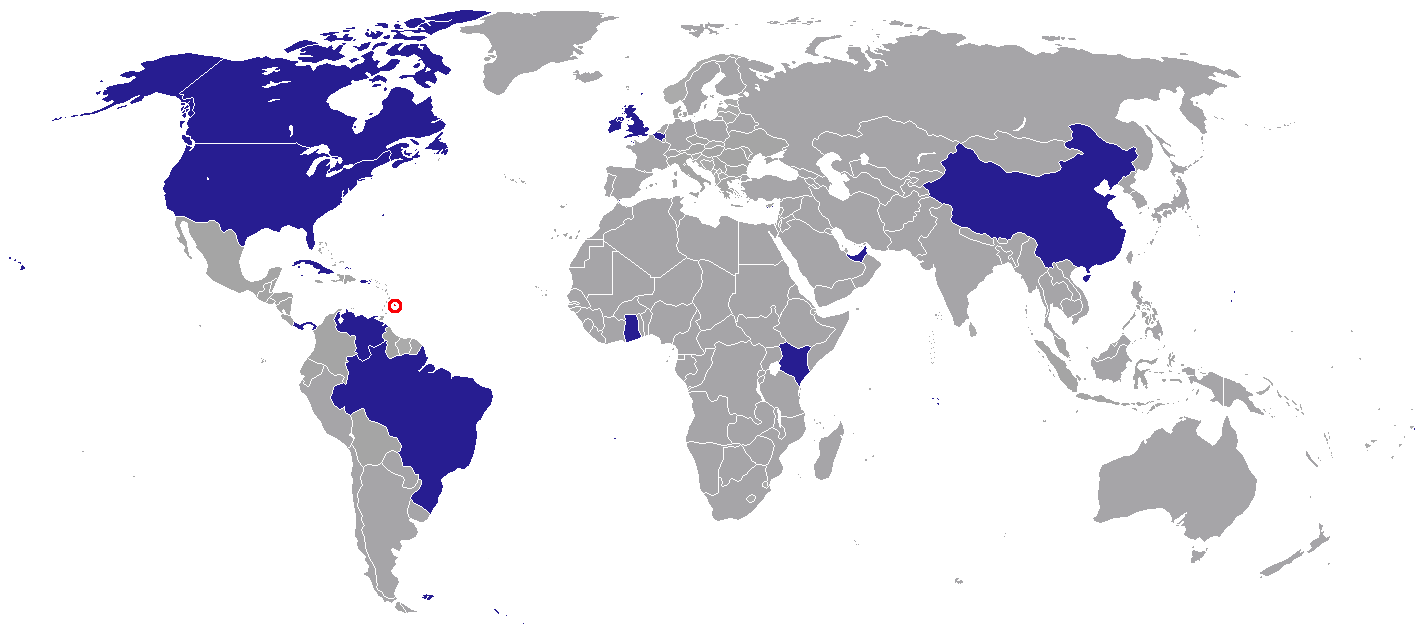
Map of diplomatic missions of Barbados: Barbados Countries that host a Barbadian Embassy or High Commission

The Caribbean nation-state of Barbados has a small, albeit growing network of diplomatic and consular missions. As a member-state of the Commonwealth of Nations, Barbadian diplomatic missions in the capitals of other Commonwealth members-states are known as High Commissions instead of embassies.

Excluded from this listing are honorary consulates, trade missions, and offices of the Barbados Tourism Authority.

== History ==
In February 2020 the two Heads of Government for both Barbados and Trinidad and Tobago initialed several agreements including one which would see the sharing of various diplomatic chancery resources around the world.

In November 2021, Barbados announced that it would launch the world's first embassy in the decentralised metaverse, an attempt to reach diplomatic parity.

== Current missions ==
=== Africa ===
Host country	Host city	Mission	Concurrent accreditation	Ref.
Ghana	Accra	High Commission	Countries: Liberia; Nigeria	
Kenya	Nairobi	High Commission	Countries: Botswana; Ethiopia; Rwanda; South Africa; Tanzania; International Organizations: United Nations; United Nations Environment Programme; United Nations Human Settlements Programme	

=== Americas ===
Host country	Host city	Mission	Concurrent accreditation	Ref.
Brazil	Brasília	Embassy	Countries: Argentina; Chile; Paraguay; Uruguay	
Canada	Ottawa	High Commission	Countries: New Zealand	
Canada	Toronto	Consulate-General	Countries: New Zealand	
Cuba	Havana	Embassy	Countries: Azerbaijan; Dominican Republic; Georgia	
Panama	Panama City	Embassy	Countries: Colombia; Costa Rica; El Salvador; Guatemala; Honduras; Mexico; Nicaragua	
United States	Washington, D.C.	Embassy	International Organizations: Organization of American States	
United States	Miami	Consulate-General	International Organizations: Organization of American States	
United States	New York City	Consulate-General	International Organizations: Organization of American States	
Venezuela	Caracas	Embassy	Countries: Peru	

=== Asia ===
Host country	Host city	Mission	Concurrent accreditation	Ref.
China	Beijing	Embassy	Countries: Cambodia; Japan; Singapore; South Korea; Thailand; Vietnam	
United Arab Emirates	Abu Dhabi	Embassy	Countries: Kuwait	

=== Europe ===
Host country	Host city	Mission	Concurrent accreditation	Ref.
Belgium	Brussels	Embassy	Countries: Finland; France; Germany; Luxembourg; Netherlands; Norway; Spain; International Organizations: European Union; Organisation for the Prohibition of Chemical Weapons	
Ireland	Dublin	Embassy		
United Kingdom	London	High Commission	Countries: Australia; Cyprus; Israel; Holy See; Malta; Poland; Sweden	

=== Multilateral organizations ===
Organization	Host city	Host country	Mission	Concurrent accreditation	Ref.
United Nations	New York City	United States	Permanent Mission		
United Nations	Geneva	Switzerland	Permanent Mission	Countries: Austria; Bulgaria; Croatia; Estonia; Hungary; Italy; Romania; Serbia; Switzerland; International Organizations: Food and Agriculture Organization; World Health Organization; World Trade Organization	

== Gallery ==
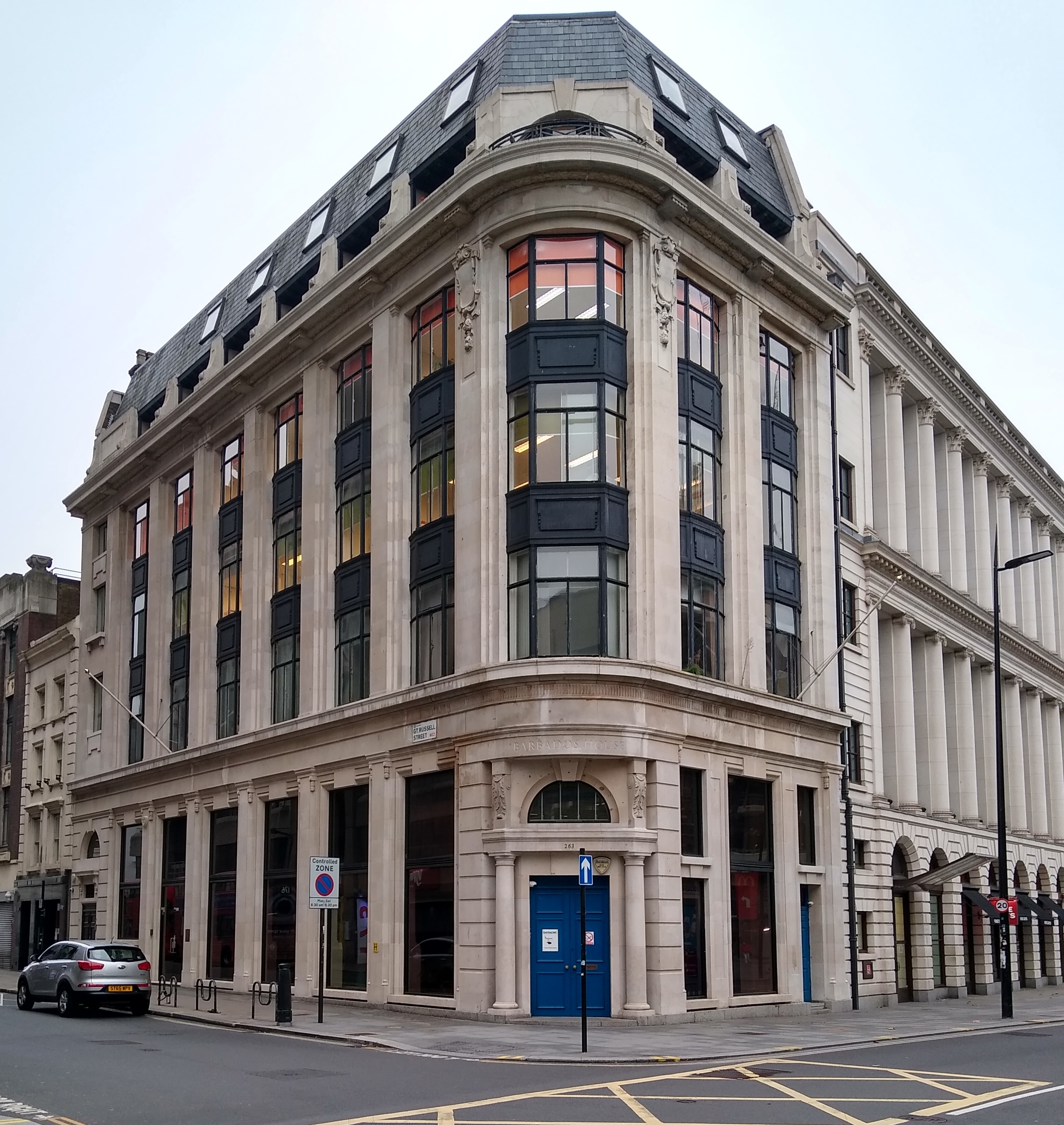
High Commission in London

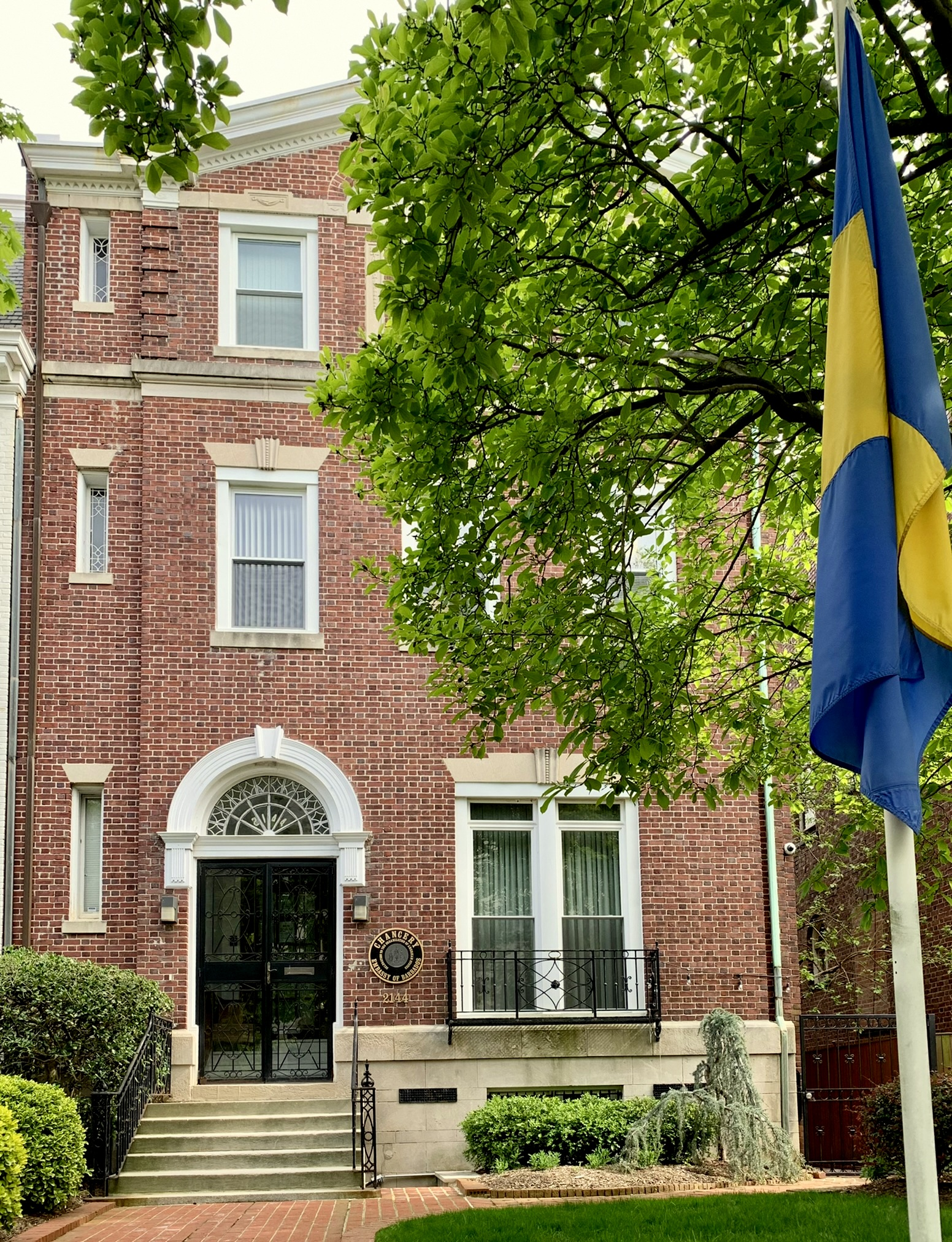
Embassy in Washington, D.C.

== Closed missions ==
=== Americas ===
Host country	Host city	Mission	Year closed	Ref.
Trinidad and Tobago	Port of Spain	High Commission	2000	

== See also ==
- Foreign relations of Barbados
- List of diplomatic missions in Barbados
- List of ambassadors and high commissioners to and from Barbados
- Visa policy of Barbados
