= Barbados–Mexico relations =

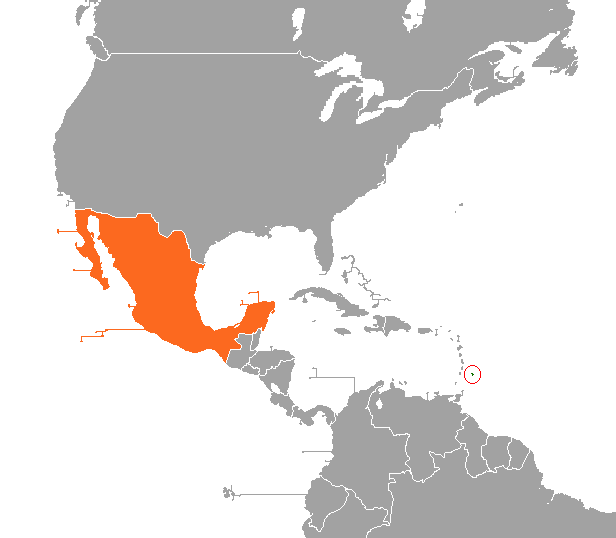

- Barbados: Mexico

The nations of Barbados and the Mexico established diplomatic relations in 1972. Both nations are members of the Association of Caribbean States, Community of Latin American and Caribbean States, Organization of American States and the United Nations.

== History ==
Barbados and Mexico established diplomatic relations on 11 September 1972. Relations between both nations have taken place in primarily multilateral forums. In January 1984, Mexico opened an honorary consulate in Bridgetown. In May 2002, Barbadian Prime Minister Owen Arthur paid a visit to Mexico to attend the Monterrey Consensus summit held in the northern Mexican city of Monterrey. In June 2002, Mexican Foreign Minister Jorge Castañeda Gutman paid a visit to Barbados to attend the 32nd General Assembly of the Organization of American States held in Bridgetown.

In February 2010, Barbadian Prime Minister David Thompson paid a visit to Cancún to attend the Mexico-Caribbean Community (CARICOM) summit. In May 2012, Mexican President Felipe Calderón paid a visit to Barbados to attend the Caribbean Community summit in Bridgetown.

In June 2014, the honorary consul of Mexico in Barbados, Sir Trevor Carmichael, was presented with Mexico's highest decoration for foreigners, the Order of the Aztec Eagle by Mexican Foreign Minister José Antonio Meade. The award recognized Sir Trevor's outstanding role in working to promote business, culture and tourism between Barbados and Mexico, as well as providing an outstanding level of consular attention. In 2014, Foreign Minister Meade paid a visit to Barbados.

In 2022, both nations celebrated 50 years of diplomatic relations.

== High-level visits ==
High-level visits from Barbados to Mexico

- Prime Minister Owen Arthur (2002)
- Prime Minister David Thompson (2010)
- Foreign Minister Maxine McClean (2017)
- Foreign Minister Jerome Walcott (2021)

High-level visits from Mexico to the Barbados

- Foreign Minister Jorge Castañeda Gutman (2002)
- President Felipe Calderón (2012)
- Foreign Minister José Antonio Meade (2014)

== Bilateral agreements ==
Both nations have signed a few bilateral agreements such an Agreement on Scientific and Technical Cooperation (1995) and an Agreement to Avoid Double Taxation and Prevent Tax Evasion in Income Tax Matters (2008). Each year, the Mexican government offers scholarships for nationals of Barbados to study postgraduate studies at Mexican higher education institutions.

== Trade ==
In 2023, trade between Barbados and Mexico totaled US$18.3 million. Barbados' main exports to Mexico include: electrical apparatuses for switching or protecting electrical circuits, insecticides, perfumery and alcohol. Mexico's main exports to Barbados include: household appliances, telephones including mobile phones, iron ore and non-alloy steel, tractors, pipes and pipe fitting and oils of petroleum. Mexican multinational company Cemex operates in Barbados.

== Diplomatic missions ==
- Barbados is accredited to Mexico from its embassy in Washington, D.C., United States.
- Mexico is accredited to Barbados from its embassy in Port of Spain, Trinidad and Tobago and maintains an honorary consulate in Bridgetown.
