= Christopher Fitzherbert Hackett =

Permanent Representative to the United Nations for Barbados
- In office 12 March 2004 – 2009
- Preceded by: June Yvonne Clarke
- Succeeded by: Joyce Dianne Bourne

Christopher Fitzherbert Hackett was the Permanent Representative for Barbados to the United Nations. He presented his credentials to the Secretary-General of the United Nations on 12 March 2004. During the 58th United Nations General Assembly, Hackett was a Senior Adviser to the President, Julian R. Hunte.

Hackett was educated at the University of the West Indies in Jamaica, Carleton University in Ottawa, Ontario, Canada (masters), and New York University (PhD in public administration). After serving briefly in the Barbados Ministry of External Affairs and as Second Minister in Barbados' mission at the UN in 1969–70, he was employed at the UN in various capacities until 2004, with his last post being Chief of the Caribbean Division, Regional Bureau for Latin America and the Caribbean, of the United Nations Development Programme (UNDP).
