= Barbados–Israel relations =

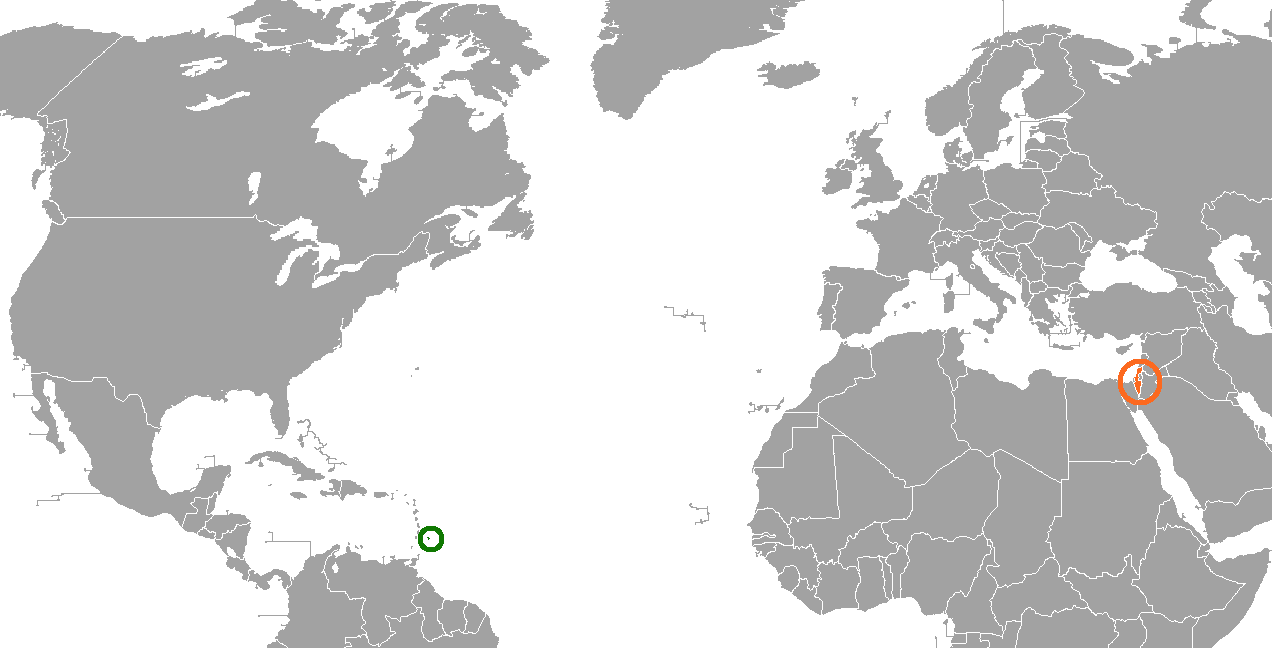
- Barbados: Israel

Barbados–Israel relations are the bilateral relations between Barbados and the State of Israel. Barbados has a consul who resides in Tel Aviv and Israel has an honorary consul who resides in Bridgetown. In addition, the Israeli ambassador for the Caribbean area, Itai Bardov איתי בר-דב, resides in Panama and is accredited for Barbados, and the Barbadian ambassador to London is accredited for Israel.

== History ==
Barbados and Israel established their diplomatic relations a year after the island gained independence from the United Kingdom. In 2014, the manual two countries maintain a lively trade of over 2 million US dollars. A small number of Barbadian professionals travel to Israel each year for advanced courses in fields such as education, agriculture, and healthcare.

The Jewish community in Barbados, although small, dates from 1654 and is among the oldest in the Americas and the oldest in the Caribbean area. Various activities help maintain the connection between the Jewish community and Israel.

Barbados, until April 2024, did not recognize a Palestinian state and had no bilateral ties with the PLO. However, on 19 April 2024, Foreign Minister Kerrie Symmonds announced that the Cabinet of Barbados reviewed a proposal to recognize the State of Palestine after meeting with Palestinian officials in September 2023 and subsequently notified the Palestinian government of their intention to formally recognize Palestine as a state. Barbados, in doing so, became the 141st country to recognize Palestine and the 11th in the Caribbean Community.

== See also ==
- List of Caribbean Jews
- Nidhe Israel Synagogue (built in 1654 in Bridgetown, Barbados)
- Haiti–Israel relations
