= High Commission of Barbados, London =

High Commission of Barbados in London
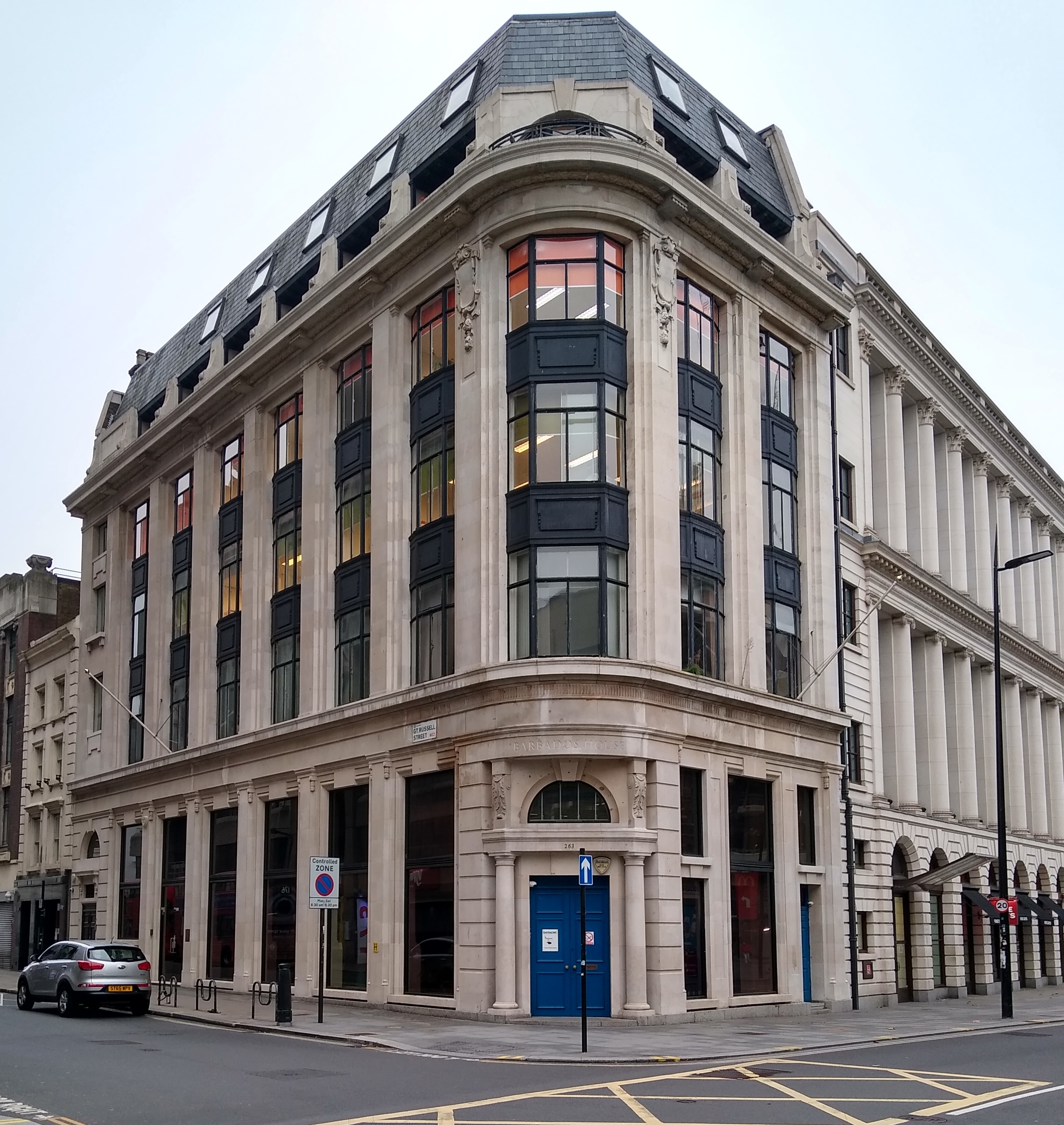
- Location: Bloomsbury, London
- Address: 1 Great Russell Street, London, WC1B 3ND
- Coordinates: 51.5171°N 0.1308°W
- High Commissioner: Mr. Milton Inniss

The High Commission of Barbados in London is the diplomatic mission of Barbados in the United Kingdom. Among the initial diplomatic missions to be established by Barbados after the attainment of independence from Britain, the office was initially located at 28 Cockspur Street where it shared a joint mission with Guyana (formerly British Guiana). In the early 1970s the mission relocated to 6 Upper Belgrave Street, London. Barbados' High Commission remained at that location until the mid-1980s when it moved to its present location at the corner of 1 Great Russell Street in London's Bloomsbury neighbourhood (within the Borough of Camden).

The High Commission is maintained by Ministry of Foreign Affairs and Trade Barbados and houses the head office of the Barbados Maritime Ship Registry (BMSR). The present High Commissioner is Milton Inniss, appointed on 1 October 2018, who replaced the Rev. Guy Hewitt.

The chancery also houses an office of the Barbados Tourism Authority. However, it utilises 263 Tottenham Court Road as its address, which is on the building's western end.

In October 2012 the Parliament of Barbados voted on a measure to allocate funds to rehabilitate and refurbish the London High Commission Chancery.

== Accreditation ==
The Barbadian High Commissioner in London is also concurrently accredited as non-resident Ambassador to the Holy See (Vatican City), Israel, and Sweden, and as non-resident High Commissioner to South Africa.

== Past high commissioners ==
Since independence, the following high commissioners have been accredited to the Court of St. James, as follows:

- Sir Lionel Alfred Luckhoo KCMG, CBE, Q.C. (1967–1970)
- James Cameron Tudor (1971–1975)
- Cecil Beaumont Williams
- Algernon Washington Symmonds (1982–1983)
- The Hon. Harold McDonald Forde (2 June 1984–1986)
- Vernon Olivier Smith (1986–1989)
- Sir William Randolph Douglas (1991–1993)
- Peter Patrick Kenneth Simmons (22 July 1997–2000)
- Lawrence Edwin Pollard (18 October 2003–31 August 2008)
- Hugh Anthony Arthur (September 2008–December 2013)
- Guy Arlington Kenneth Hewitt (January 2014–October 2018)

== High Commissioner of the Republic of Barbados ==
- Milton Inniss (since 30 November 2021)

== Gallery ==
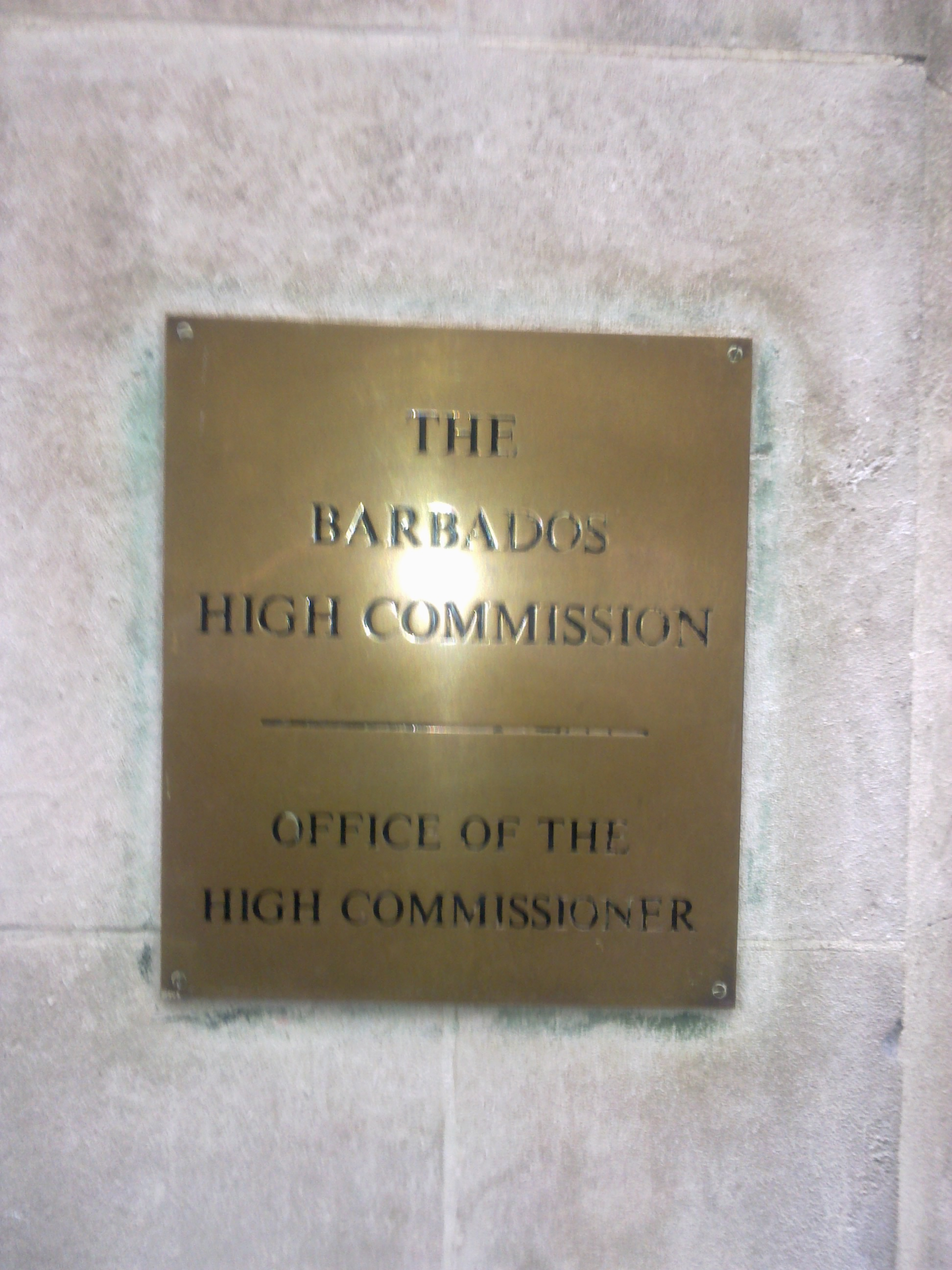
Plaque outside the High Commission

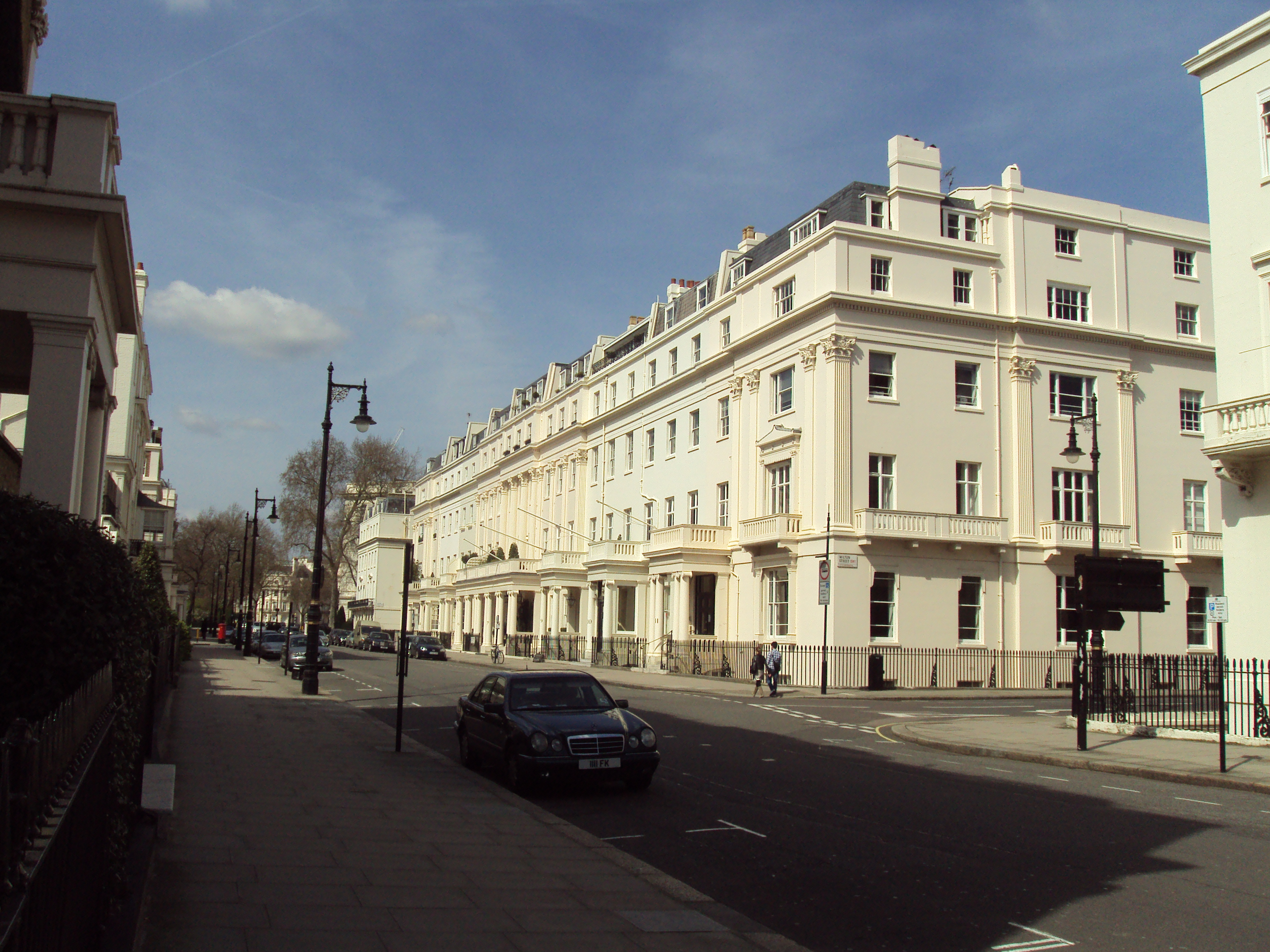
Former Barbadian High Commission at 6 Upper Belgrave Street, Belgravia

== See also ==
- Diplomatic missions of Barbados
- List of diplomatic missions in the United Kingdom
- List of ambassadors and high commissioners to the United Kingdom
- Barbados – United Kingdom relations
