= Barbados–Guyana relations =

Barbados-Guyana relations
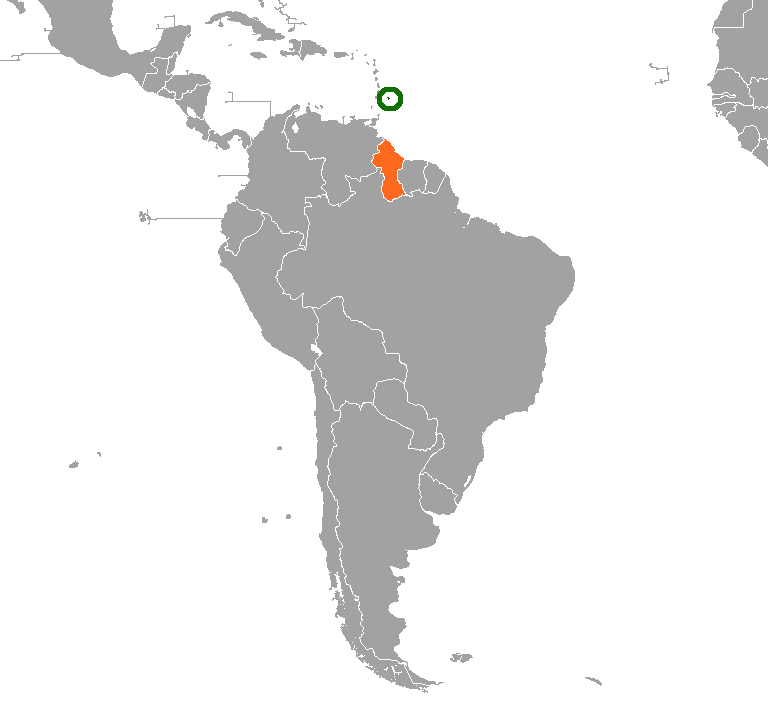

- Barbados: Guyana

Barbados–Guyana relations refers to the current and historical relationship between Barbados and Guyana. The former maintains non-resident diplomatic representation from Bridgetown, while Guyana which prior had a High Commissioner to Barbados appointed its first resident Consul-General, Michael Brotherson to Bridgetown in January 2012.

== General aspects ==
The relations between Guyana and Barbados began while both were part of the British Empire. Shortly after Great Britain secured (then British Guiana) from the Dutch, waves of migrants were encouraged to move and settle the new expansive area. Barbados was one such location where large numbers of migrants came from. Through time Barbados and Guyana have both supported each other. With the move towards independence in the region, Guyana was seen as the breadbasket of the wider-Caribbean which led to yet more waves of Barbadians seeking to move to Guyana for better opportunities.

In 1991 Barbados and the Co-Operative Republic of Guyana attempted moves towards forming a tri-state confederation consisting of Barbados, Guyana and Trinidad and Tobago. The now late former Prime Minister of Trinidad and Tobago, Patrick Manning pitched the initiative for the tri-state area to enter into some form of political union or political association. This initiative was short lived and did not proceed following the Democratic Labour Party's defeat during the 1994 elections.

Relations became rocky due to immigration. Things became contentious for Guyanese persons to Barbados. The two nations continue their cooperation through the Caribbean Community (CARICOM) and work towards building and maintaining good relations between their nationals. In 2012 the Consul-General of Guyana to Bridgetown remarked that immigration matters between Guyana and Barbados had substantially improved with no complaints since being attributed to Bridgetown.

More recently the Guyanese Government has extended an offer to Barbadians. The Guyanese government has offered to put in place an economically favourable regime towards any Barbadians that wish to relocate to Guyana and contribute towards that nation's goals in agricultural investment. The announcement was made in the final days of the Owen Arthur administration by MP member Mia Motley.

In 2004 both nations signed treaties to cooperate in the portion of overlapping international maritime boundary.

In 2007 both nations formed the Barbados-Guyana Joint Commission, which was held in Guyana for its inaugural meeting. The third meeting of the Joint Commission met in Georgetown in May 2015.

In 2013, trade between both nations was placed at US$25 million by the Consul-General of Guyana. both nations also explored an initiative of twinning in the hospitality and tourism sector as well as an arrangement for joint collaboration in the overlapping maritime EEZ between both nations.

In 2016 Guyanese President, Granger presented Barbadian Prime Minister, Freundel Stuart with the second highest award of Guyana, the Order of Roraima.

== Sports ==
Both countries are part of the multi-national West Indies cricket team, with several players from both countries representing the board.

== People ==
- Eddy Grant, a musician charged with creating the genre of Ringbang in Barbados.
- Lionel Luckhoo, served concurrently as a joint High Commissioner of both Guyana and Barbados to the United Kingdom (1967 to 1970)
- Dr. Samuel Rudolph Insanally, CCH Guyana's High Commissioner to Barbados (1982 to 1986)
- Rihanna, international pop star born in Barbados of partial Guyanese parentage.

== See also ==
- Caribbean Community (CARICOM)
- Union of South American Nations (USAN)
