= Barbados and CARICOM =

The nation of Barbados has been a supporter of the Caribbean Community (CARICOM). Barbados was one of the four founding members in 1973 which then along with Guyana, Jamaica, and Trinidad and Tobago moved to establish the organization then known as the Caribbean Community and Common Market. This new organization became a successor to the Caribbean Free Trade Association (CARIFTA) of which Barbados was also a member.

Within the CARICOM quasi-cabinet, the Barbadian head of government's responsibility is as the lead Head of Government for the Caribbean Single Market & Economy (CSME) in CARICOM. The former prime minister of Barbados Owen Arthur strongly lobbied the CARICOM heads to push the organization beyond the goal of a mere Common market and instead transform it into a Caribbean one-Single Market and Economy.

Several organizations of the Caribbean Community (CARICOM) organization are physically based in Barbados including:

- Caribbean Disaster Emergency Management Agency (CDEMA)
- Caribbean Examinations Council (CXC)
- Caribbean Regional Organisation for Standards and Quality (CROSQ)

Barbados also maintains a Cabinet level position to the Caribbean Community.

For its own purposes, the CARICOM organization classifies its members as either More Developed Countries or Less developed countries. Barbados is classified as fitting into the More Developed Country (MDC) range. As such, Barbados is a large stakeholder in the CARICOM Regional Development Fund for other CARICOM member states to borrow.

== National accreditation to CARICOM ==
The seat of Barbadian non-resident accreditation to the other countries of CARICOM is from Bridgetown, and is the same for all members. No members of CARICOM currently maintain resident accreditation to Bridgetown, Barbados. The accreditation to Barbados is the following:

- Antigua and Barbuda - from St. John's, Antigua
- The Bahamas - from Nassau, New Providence
- Belize - vacant
- Dominica - vacant
- Grenada - vacant
- Guyana - from Georgetown, Guyana
- Haiti - from Kingston, Jamaica
- Jamaica - from Port-of-Spain, Trinidad and Tobago
- Montserrat (U.K. overseas territory. Foreign relations is responsibility of the U.K. government.)
- Saint Kitts and Nevis - vacant
- Saint Lucia - vacant
- Saint Vincent and the Grenadines - vacant
- Suriname - from Port-of-Spain, Trinidad and Tobago
- Trinidad and Tobago - from Port-of-Spain, Trinidad and Tobago

== Immigration ==
In recognition of the CARICOM (Free Movement) Skilled Persons Act which came into effect in July 1997 in some of the CARICOM countries such as Barbados and which has been adopted in other CARICOM countries, such as Trinidad and Tobago it is possible that CARICOM nationals who hold the "A Certificate of Recognition of Caribbean Community Skilled Person" will be allowed to work in Barbados under normal working conditions.
