= United Nations Security Council Resolution 230 =

UN Security Council Resolution 230
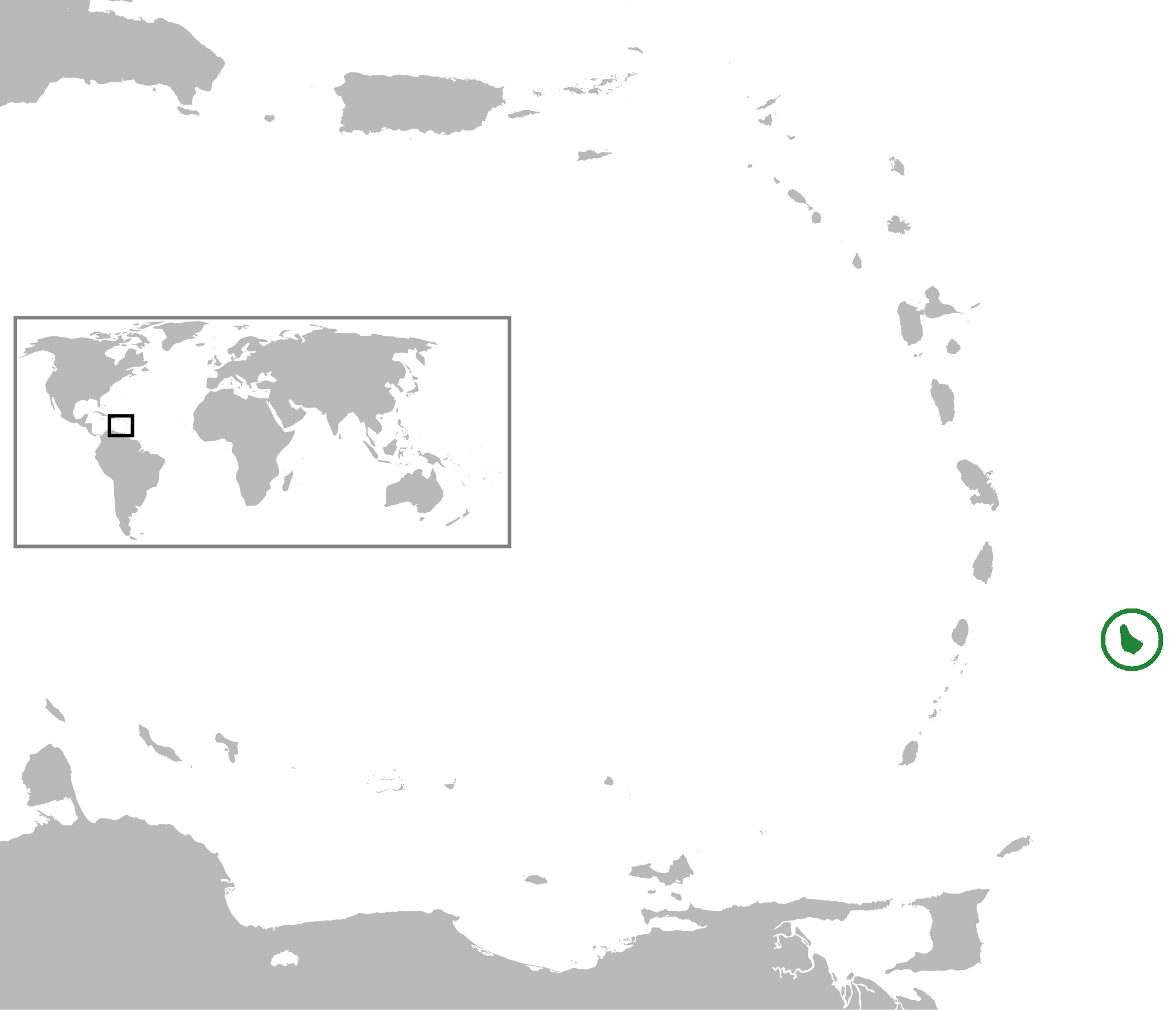
- Location of Barbados within the Caribbean
- Date: December 7 1966
- Meeting no.: 1330
- Code: A/2175 (XXI) (Document)
- Subject: Admission of new Members to the UN: Barbados
- Voting summary: 15 voted for; None voted against; None abstained
- Result: Adopted

Security Council composition
- Permanent members: China; France; Soviet Union; United Kingdom; United States
- Non-permanent members: Argentina; Bulgaria; Japan; Jordan; Mali; Netherlands; New Zealand; Nigeria; Uganda; Uruguay

United Nations Security Council Resolution 230 was adopted unanimously by the United Nations Security Council on December 7, 1966. The Council recommended that the General Assembly admit Barbados as a member state. As a result, the flag for the country of Barbados was formally raised at the United Nations Headquarters in New York City on 9 December 1966.

== See also ==
- Foreign relations of Barbados
- Permanent Representative of Barbados to the United Nations
- List of countries that have gained independence from the United Kingdom
- List of United Nations Security Council Resolutions 201 to 300 (1965–1971)
