= Economy of Barbados =

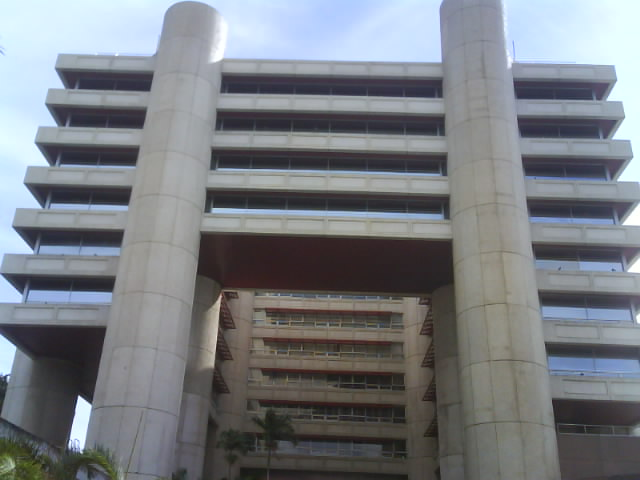
- Central Bank of Barbados
- Currency: Barbadian dollar (BBD)
- Fiscal year: 1 April – 31 March
- Trade organisations: WTO
- Country group: Developing/Emerging; High-income economy

Statistics
- Population: ▲286,641 (2018)
- GDP: ▲$7.55 billion (nominal; 2025); ▲$6.78 billion (PPP; 2025)
- GDP rank: 153rd (nominal; 2025); 170th (PPP; 2025)
- GDP growth: ▲4.1% (2023); ▲4.0% (2024); ▲3.0% (2025); ▲2.3% (2026f)
- GDP per capita: ▲$25,900 (nominal; 2025); ▲$23,270 (PPP; 2025)
- GDP per capita rank: 45th (nominal; 2025); 81st (PPP; 2025)
- GDP by sector: agriculture: 1.5%; industry: 9.8%; services: 88.7%; (2017 est.)
- Inflation (CPI): 3.688% (2018)
- Population below national poverty line: N/A
- Human Development Index: ▼0.790 high (2021) (70th); ▼0.657 medium IHDI (2021)
- Labour force: ▼155,283 (2018); ▲59.9% employment rate (2016)
- Labour force by occupation: agriculture: 10%; industry: 15%; services: 75%; (1996 est.)
- Unemployment: ▲10.1% (2017 est.)
- Main industries: tourism, sugar, light manufacturing, component assembly for export

External
- Exports: ▼$485.4 million (2017 est.)
- Export goods: manufactures, sugar, molasses, rum, other foodstuffs and beverages, chemicals, electrical components
- Main export partners: United States 38%; Trinidad and Tobago 10.2%; Guyana 5.5%; Jamaica 5%; China 4.8%; St. Lucia 4.6%; the Bahamas 3.8%; (2017)
- Imports: ▲$1.52 billion (2017 est.)
- Import goods: consumer goods, machinery, foodstuffs, construction materials, chemicals, fuel, electrical components
- Main import partners: United States 38.5%; Trinidad and Tobago 14.6%; United Kingdom 7.3%; China 6.7%; Canada 4.6%; (2017)
- Current account: ▲ −$189 million (2017 est.)
- Gross external debt: $4.49 billion (2010 est.)

Public finance
- Government debt: ▲157.3% of GDP (2017 est.)
- Foreign reserves: ▼$264.5 million (31 December 2017 est.)
- Budget balance: −4% (of GDP) (2017 est.)
- Revenue: 1.466 billion (2013 est.) (2017 est.)
- Spending: 1.664 billion (2017 est.)
- Economic aid: $9.8 million (recipient; 1995)
- Credit rating: Standard & Poor's: CC (Domestic); SD (Foreign)
- All values, unless otherwise stated, are in US dollars.

Since the island country's independence in 1966, the economy of Barbados has been transformed from a low-income economy dependent upon sugar production into a high-income economy based on service-driven industries and the offshore sector. The country's three main economic drivers are: tourism, the international business sector, and foreign direct investment.

Barbados went into a deep recession in the 1990s after 3 years of steady decline brought on by fundamental macroeconomic imbalances. After a painful re-adjustment process, the economy began to grow again in 1993. Growth rates have averaged between 3%–5% since then.

In June 2018 Barbados announced the default on its bonds, after revealing that its debt amounted to $7.5 billion (the fourth highest debt in debt-to-GDP ratio in the world).

== History ==
=== Pre-independence colonial era ===
Since the first settlement by the British in 1625, through history the economy of Barbados was primarily dependent on agriculture. It had been recorded that minus the marshes and gully regions, during the 1630s much of the desirable land had been deforested across the entire island. In the 1640s, Barbados shifted from small-scale mixed crop farming using indentured labor to large-scale sugar production, introduced by the Jewish community that immigrated to Barbados when exiled from Dutch Brazil. Land was divided into large estate-plantations, with a labor-force that was almost entirely made up of enslaved men and women.

Sugar cane became the driving force in the economy of Barbados. Barbados soon had built so many windmills that the island had the second highest density of windmills per square mile in the world, after the Netherlands. For about the next 100 years Barbados remained the richest of all the European colonies in the Caribbean region due to sugar. The prosperity in the colony of Barbados remained regionally unmatched until sugar cane production caught up in geographically larger countries such as Jamaica and elsewhere. Despite being eclipsed by larger makers of sugar, Barbados continued to produce the crop well into the 20th century.

While the emancipation of African slaves in the British Empire in 1833, nominally liberated the slaves, limited access to education and land kept the freed as a disenfranchised underclass. As such, emphasis began to be placed on increased labour rights as well as upward mobility and strong education to combat plantation living.

During the 1920s, politicians in Barbados started a push for more self-government. As the 1940s–1950s rolled around, Barbados moved towards developing political ties with neighbouring Caribbean islands. By 1958 the West Indies Federation was proposed by the British government for Barbados and nine other Caribbean territories. The Federation was first led by the Premier of Barbados, however the experiment ended by 1962. Later, Barbados tried to negotiate several other unions with other islands, yet it became likely that Barbados needed to move on. Subsequently, the island peacefully negotiated its independence with the British Government and the island became independent at midnight on November 30, 1966.

=== Post-independence ===
After the country became independent of the United Kingdom on 30 November 1966 sugar cane still remained a chief money-maker for Barbados. The island's politicians tried to diversify the economy from just agriculture. During the 1950s–1960s visitors from both Canada and the United Kingdom started transforming tourism into a huge contributor for the Barbadian economy. The man-made Deep Water Harbour port at Bridgetown had been completed in 1961, and thereafter the island could handle most modern oceangoing ships for shipping sugar or handling cargoes at the port facility.

As the 1970s progressed, global companies started to recognise Barbados for its highly educated population. In May 1972 Barbados formed its own Central Bank, breaking off from the East Caribbean Currency Authority (ECCA). By 1975 the Barbadian dollar was changed to a new fixed / constant rate of exchange rate with the US$ with the rate being changed to present day US$1 = BBD$1.98 (BBD$1.00 = ~US$0.50).

By the 1980s a growing manufacturing industry was seen as a considerable earner for the Barbados economy. With manufacturing then being led by companies such as Intel Corporation and others, the Manufacturing industry contributed greatly to the economy during the 1980s and early 1990s.

Under the 1993 Wage and Price Protocol, workers and unions assented to a one-time cut in real wages of about 9 percent and agreed to keep their demands for future pay raises in line with increases in productivity. Firms promised to moderate their price increases, the government maintained the parity of the currency, and all parties agreed to the creation of a national productivity board to provide better data on which to base future negotiations.

In the early 1990s the country's economy was hit hard when real GDP per capita declined by 5.1% per year between 1989 and 1992 partly due to the 1990 oil price spike. Barbados entered into an agreement with the International Monetary Fund financial assistance after a long and hard period of negotiations between the IMF, the government of Barbados, labour unions and employers. This led to a protocol on wages and prices in 1993. This helped prevent an inflationary spiral and restored the island's international competitiveness thereby leading to a period of long-term economic growth of 2.7% between 1993 and 2000.

As one of the founding members, Barbados joined the World Trade Organization (WTO) on 1 January 1995. Following this, the Government of Barbados aggressively tried to make the Barbados economy fully WTO compliant. This led to the collapse of much of the manufacturing industry of Barbados during the late 1990s in favour of many companies like Intel and others moving to lower cost Asian economies. During the late 1990s more companies started to become interested in Barbados's offshore sector, until it over took sugar as the new chief money maker. In 1999–2000 the Organisation for Economic Co-operation and Development (OECD) "blacklist" was circulated with Barbados listed in error. The negative fallout stymied new investment into Barbados's offshore sector for nearly two years as Barbadian authorities acted swiftly successfully proving that Barbados's economy was regulated sufficiently to ward off financial criminal activity and that it was not a "tax haven" as charged, but instead a low-tax regime.

As the global recession hit in 2001, the offshore sector in Barbados slightly contracted further, thereby making tourism the new chief money maker, after having earlier eclipsed manufacturing and sugar cane. The Government of Barbados further changed legislation to transform the Barbados economy into one which fosters investment. This led to several new hotel developments. The government continues to try maintaining constraint from personal involvement in the Hotel activity and instead seeks private investment into the Barbados economy for future growth.

Several large hotel projects like the Port Charles Marina project in Speightstown helped the tourism industry continue to expand in 1996–99, and more recently the new Hilton Hotel on Needhams Point, Saint Michael in 2005.

Various firms from Wall Street in New York provide routine economic analysis of the Barbadian economy. This has included such firms as Standard & Poor's and Moody's.

In 2026, Export Barbados promoted the Green Industrialist Gateway Advantage (GIGA), an initiative intended to connect entrepreneurs with financing, technology, production facilities, certification, energy and global markets as part of efforts to develop Barbados's industrial capacity.

== Data ==
The following table shows the main economic indicators in 1980–2021 (with IMF staff estimates in 2022–2027). Inflation below 5% is in green.

| Year | GDP (in Bil. US$PPP) | GDP per capita (in US$ PPP) | GDP (in Bil. US$nominal) | GDP per capita (in US$ nominal) | GDP growth (real) | Inflation rate (in Per cent) | Unemployment (in Per cent) | Government debt (in % of GDP) |
|---|---|---|---|---|---|---|---|---|
| 1980 | 1.5 | 6,000.5 | 1.0 | 4,036.5 | ▲4.4% | ▲18.5% | n/a | n/a |
| 1981 | ▲1.6 | ▲6,420.8 | ▲1.1 | ▲4,427.1 | ▼-1.9% | ▲14.6% | ▼10.8% | n/a |
| 1982 | 1.6 | ▲6,464.1 | ▲1.2 | ▲4,611.7 | ▼-4.9% | ▲10.3% | ▲13.7% | n/a |
| 1983 | ▲1.7 | ▲6,732.8 | 1.2 | ▲4,882.8 | ▲0.5% | ▲5.3% | ▲14.9% | n/a |
| 1984 | ▲1.8 | ▲7,207.9 | ▲1.4 | ▲5,308.3 | ▲3.6% | ▲4.6% | ▲17.0% | n/a |
| 1985 | ▲1.9 | ▲7,496.1 | 1.4 | ▲5,539.6 | ▲1.1% | ▲4.9% | ▲18.6% | n/a |
| 1986 | ▲2.1 | ▲8,011.6 | ▲1.6 | ▲6,062.8 | ▲5.1% | ▲0.2% | ▼17.7% | n/a |
| 1987 | ▲2.2 | ▲8,394.6 | ▲1.7 | ▲6,653.7 | ▲2.6% | ▲3.6% | ▲17.9% | n/a |
| 1988 | ▲2.3 | ▲8,962.9 | ▲1.8 | ▲7,052.0 | ▲3.5% | ▲4.7% | ▼17.1% | n/a |
| 1989 | ▲2.5 | ▲9,615.1 | ▲2.0 | ▲7,776.7 | ▲3.6% | ▲6.3% | ▼15.2% | n/a |
| 1990 | 2.5 | ▼9,611.8 | 2.0 | ▼7,772.2 | ▼-3.3% | ▲3.0% | ▼14.9% | n/a |
| 1991 | 2.5 | ▼9,516.4 | 2.0 | ▲7,777.9 | ▼-3.9% | ▲6.3% | ▲17.2% | n/a |
| 1992 | ▼2.4 | ▼9,146.7 | 2.0 | ▼7,464.9 | ▼-5.7% | ▲6.0% | ▲22.9% | n/a |
| 1993 | ▲2.5 | ▲9,405.9 | ▲2.1 | ▲7,886.8 | ▲0.8% | ▲1.2% | ▲24.4% | n/a |
| 1994 | ▲2.6 | ▲9,764.6 | ▲2.2 | ▲8,194.4 | ▲2.0% | ▲0.7% | ▼21.8% | 55.9% |
| 1995 | ▲2.7 | ▲10,134.8 | 2.2 | ▲8,414.1 | ▲2.0% | ▲2.8% | ▼19.6% | ▲57.9% |
| 1996 | ▲2.8 | ▲10,690.0 | ▲2.4 | ▲8,938.6 | ▲4.0% | ▲2.4% | ▼15.8% | ▲58.5% |
| 1997 | ▲3.0 | ▲11,347.0 | ▲2.5 | ▲9,412.4 | ▲4.7% | ▲7.7% | ▼14.6% | ▼58.5% |
| 1998 | ▲3.2 | ▲11,859.3 | ▲2.8 | ▲10,573.1 | ▲3.7% | ▲-1.3% | ▼12.2% | ▼53.9% |
| 1999 | 3.2 | ▲12,022.0 | ▲3.0 | ▲11,039.1 | ▲0.3% | ▲1.6% | ▼10.4% | ▼53.8% |
| 2000 | ▲3.5 | ▲12,797.8 | ▲3.1 | ▲11,337.0 | ▲4.5% | ▲2.4% | ▼9.4% | ▲61.3% |
| 2001 | ▼3.4 | ▼12,736.8 | 3.1 | ▼11,284.4 | ▼-2.4% | ▲2.8% | ▲9.9% | ▲67.5% |
| 2002 | ▲3.5 | ▲12,999.5 | 3.1 | ▲11,442.6 | ▲0.8% | ▲0.2% | ▲10.3% | ▲71.0% |
| 2003 | ▲3.7 | ▲13,505.1 | ▲3.2 | ▲11,788.7 | ▲2.2% | ▲1.6% | ▲11.0% | ▼70.9% |
| 2004 | ▲3.8 | ▲14,019.8 | ▲3.4 | ▲12,612.2 | ▲1.4% | ▲1.4% | ▼9.6% | ▼70.5% |
| 2005 | ▲4.1 | ▲14,982.5 | ▲3.8 | ▲13,939.7 | ▲4.0% | ▲6.1% | ▼9.1% | ▲73.3% |
| 2006 | ▲4.5 | ▲16,259.1 | ▲4.2 | ▲15,334.0 | ▲5.7% | ▲7.3% | ▼8.7% | ▲75.8% |
| 2007 | ▲4.7 | ▲16,997.6 | ▲4.7 | ▲16,925.6 | ▲2.2% | ▲4.0% | ▼7.4% | ▲77.4% |
| 2008 | ▲4.8 | ▲17,370.9 | ▲4.8 | ▲17,254.2 | ▲0.7% | ▲8.1% | ▲8.1% | ▲83.4% |
| 2009 | ▼4.6 | ▼16,526.2 | ▼4.5 | ▼16,036.4 | ▼-5.1% | ▲3.6% | ▲10.0% | ▲100.0% |
| 2010 | 4.6 | ▼16,278.0 | 4.5 | ▲16,203.3 | ▼-2.3% | ▲5.8% | ▲10.3% | ▲108.2% |
| 2011 | 4.6 | ▲16,443.7 | ▲4.7 | ▲16,599.0 | ▼-0.7% | ▲9.4% | ▲11.2% | ▲112.6% |
| 2012 | ▼4.3 | ▼15,425.3 | ▼4.6 | ▼16,372.0 | ▼-0.5% | ▲4.5% | ▲11.5% | ▲123.7% |
| 2013 | ▲4.4 | ▲15,432.5 | ▲4.7 | ▲16,556.1 | ▼-1.4% | ▲1.8% | ▲11.6% | ▲135.2% |
| 2014 | ▼4.3 | ▼15,252.1 | 4.7 | ▲16,572.3 | ▼-0.1% | ▲1.8% | ▲12.3% | ▲139.3% |
| 2015 | ▲4.4 | ▲15,571.2 | 4.7 | ▲16,589.5 | ▲2.4% | ▲-1.1% | ▼11.3% | ▲147.0% |
| 2016 | ▲4.6 | ▲15,996.9 | ▲4.8 | ▲16,947.6 | ▲2.5% | ▲1.5% | ▼9.7% | ▲149.5% |
| 2017 | ▼4.5 | ▼15,817.7 | ▲5.0 | ▲17,423.3 | ▲0.5% | ▲4.4% | ▲10.0% | ▲158.3% |
| 2018 | ▲4.6 | ▲16,060.4 | ▲5.1 | ▲17,758.1 | ▼-0.6% | ▲3.7% | ▲10.1% | ▼126.0% |
| 2019 | 4.6 | ▲16,096.4 | ▲5.3 | ▲18,448.8 | ▼-1.3% | ▲4.1% | 10.1% | ▼123.2% |
| 2020 | ▼4.0 | ▼14,018.1 | ▼4.7 | ▼16,245.1 | ▼-13.7% | ▲2.9% | ▲21.3% | ▲147.0% |
| 2021 | ▲4.2 | ▲14,665.6 | ▲4.9 | ▲16,817.3 | ▲0.7% | ▲3.1% | ▼14.1% | ▼135.4% |
| 2022 | ▲5.0 | ▲17,313.7 | ▲5.8 | ▲20,003.7 | ▲10.5% | ▲9.9% | ▼10.8% | ▼117.9% |
| 2023 | ▲5.4 | ▲18,779.5 | ▲6.3 | ▲21,636.4 | ▲5.0% | ▲8.2% | ▼10.0% | ▼110.0% |
| 2024 | ▲5.7 | ▲19,698.8 | ▲6.7 | ▲22,934.7 | ▲3.0% | ▲5.3% | ▼9.9% | ▼103.0% |
| 2025 | ▲6.0 | ▲20,534.5 | ▲7.0 | ▲24,124.8 | ▲2.6% | ▲3.5% | 9.9% | ▼95.7% |
| 2026 | ▲6.2 | ▲21,352.5 | ▲7.4 | ▲25,158.9 | ▲2.3% | ▲2.8% | ▼9.8% | ▼89.4% |
| 2027 | ▲6.5 | ▲22,110.1 | ▲7.6 | ▲26,056.6 | ▲1.8% | ▲2.4% | ▼9.5% | ▼83.5% |

== Current ==
In 2008, Barbados had a GDP (PPP) of $5.466 billion, a GDP (official exchange rate) of $3.777 billion, a GDP real growth rate of 1.5%, and a per capita PPP of $19,300. The GDP was composed of the following sectors: agriculture 6%, industry 16%, and services 78% (2000 est.) In 2001, it had a labor force of 128,500, of which 10% were in agriculture, 15% in industry, and 75% in services (1996 est.). The unemployment rate in 2003 was 10.7%, and the inflation rate in 2007 was 5.5%. The Barbadian government had estimated revenues of $847 million (including grants) in 2000, and expenditures of $886 million. The industrial production growth rate was -3.2%.

Offshore finance and informatics are important foreign exchange earners, and there is also a light manufacturing sector. The government continues its efforts to reduce the unacceptably high unemployment rate, which it met in the 1990s, encourage direct foreign investment, and privatise remaining state owned Crown corporations of Barbados.

The main factors responsible for the improvement in economic activity include an expansion in the number of tourist arrivals, an increase in manufacturing, and an increase in sugar production. Recently, offshore banking and financial services also have become an important source of foreign exchange and economic growth.

Economic growth has led to net increases in employment in the tourism sector, as well as in construction and other services sub-sectors of the economy. The public service remains Barbados's largest single employer. Total labour force has increased from 126,000 in 1993 to 140,000 persons in 2000, and unemployment has dropped significantly from over 20% in the early 1990s to 9.3% at the end of 2000.

The Barbados government encourages the development in: financial services, informatics, e-commerce, tourism, educational and health services, and cultural services for the future. In 2000, based on Barbados's level of growth – (at the time) Barbados was supposed to become the world's smallest developed country by 2008. This had then been restated as being achievable by around 2025.

In May 2018 The Prime Minister Mia Mottley disclosed previously uncovered financial obligations of the state. The Prime Minister said that the new government inherited 15 billion Barbados dollars of debt (about 7.5 billion US dollars). Disclosure of information about the current level of debt has led to an increase in the debt-to-GDP ratio from 137% to 175%. This is the fourth value in the world after Japan, Greece, and Sudan. Mia Mottley announced that new government had no other choice than to ask the IMF to facilitate debt restructuring. On 5 June 2018 Barbados didn't fulfill its obligation to pay the 26th coupon on Eurobonds maturing in 2035. According to Cbonds, excluding the disclosure of the true level of debt, on 7 June 2018 the country had 47 debt issues in circulation totaling 4.425 billion US dollars.

=== Wages ===
Although Barbadians have been ranked as being on the high end of wages compared to those in the Americas, prices for food, goods and services are also extremely high. The national minimum wage in Barbados, where wages can be no less than BBD$8.50 (~ US$4.21) per hour.

In October 2009, Dr. DeLisle Worrell, who later become the replacement governor of Barbados's Central Bank of Barbados and was executive director of the Centre for Money and Finance at the UWI Cave Hill Campus revealed that "the average Barbadian now earns between BBD$200 and BBD$499 per week...."

In 2010 Barbados's population was tabulated at some 281,968 with 80% at working age yet less than half (106,241 or 38%) were actually registered as employed.

Of these the overall estimates of his finds showed that:

- There was a roughly 4,400 (1.6%) workers who earned less than BBD$200 (US$100) per week.
- There were 32,800 (12%) workers who earned between BBD$200 (US$100) and BBD$499 (US$249.50) a week.
- About 19,100 (7%) workers who earned from BBD$500 (US$250) to BBD$999(US$449.50),
- 3,700 (1.3%) workers who earned between BBD$1000 (US$500) and BBD$1300(US$650), and
- 4,100 (1.5%) who earned more than BBD$1300 (US$650) a week.

=== Taxation ===
==== General ====
In 1996-97 Barbados implemented a general taxation that covers most items. Known as the Value-Added Tax ("VAT") it covers almost all items at a 17.5% tax rate and an 8.75% for hotel accommodations. Exported goods and services, prescription drugs and a few other specific items are zero rated under the legislation. The VAT replaced several other taxes such as: the Consumption Tax, Surcharge, Excise Tax and an Environmental Levy. People operating under Barbados's VAT regime must be registered for VAT and from 1 December 2010, the threshold for VAT registration has been BBD$80,000 (previously BBD$60,000).

The island continues to wean off of taxes outside of the VAT system. In 2002 the Barbados government increased the level of people in Barbados who are exempt from having to pay taxes on their homes. This has steadily grown with the island heading for a possible rate of 0% taxation in all other areas.

The government has also toyed with the idea of making retirement savings as tax exempt, to encourage Barbadians to spend less on goods and to encourage Barbadians to save more income as they once used to.

Building and land owners are liable to land tax on the market value of their property at rates currently ranging from 0.1 per cent (for valuations from BBD$150,000) to 0.75 per cent (BBD$1,000,000) on all properties (revalued on a three-year basis) and there are approximately 115,000 parcels listed. Exemptions include crown land; University of the West Indies; religious and benevolent organizations (of which there are many thousands); cemeteries; etc.

| Annual Land Tax Collections: | Residential | Non residential | Land only | Total (BBD$ million) |
| 2008 | 37.4 | 45.4 | 27.4 | 110.2 |
| 2009 | 36.9 | 46.3 | 28.1 | 111.3 |
| 2010 | 39.4 | 48.7 | 29.4 | 117.5 |
| 2011 | 41.8 | 45.5 | 31.7 | 119.0 |
| 2012 | 43.8 | 41.5 | 34.6 | 119.9 |

Personal income tax was lowered from 20% to 17.5% in 2012 and applied on income of less than BBD$30,000 with a rate of 35% apply on income over BBD$30,000 and individuals who are both resident and domiciled in Barbados are taxed on their worldwide income. Generally, persons paying salaries or wages or other emoluments must withhold tax from remuneration paid to employees (PAYE). Every individual between the ages of 16 and 65, who is employed in Barbados must be insured under the National Insurance and Social Security Act and contributions are determined as a percentage of insurable earnings up to a maximum of $4,090 per month or $944 per week up to 13.5% (6.5% from employee and 6.5% from employer).

A new tax, called the Municipal Solid Waste Tax, was introduced and took effective in 2014.

Tax on Income, Profits and Capital Gains include: Income Tax, Corporate Tax, Withholding Tax, and Insurance Premium Tax.

Tax on Goods and Services include: Consumption Tax, Excise Taxes, Value Added Tax, Hotel & Restaurant Tax, Other Taxes on Goods and Services (includes Licenses, Motor Vehicle Tax, and Selective Taxes on Services).

Corporation tax rates charge 'Regular' companies 25% and 'Small' companies 15%. Employers must remit tax withheld from employees' emoluments to the Department of Inland Revenue by the 15th day of the next month after they deducted the tax.

Stamp duty tax is still levied on sale of shares of companies listed on the Barbados Stock Exchange; on sale of real estate, leases and shares in public companies; and on mortgages.

==== Bilateral treaties ====
Barbados has several bilateral tax treaties, mostly aimed at removing double taxation on companies that operate in the Barbados economy. Since Barbados is at times considered an expensive place to conduct business, the treaties are mainly a measure to provide some savings to international businesses that operate in Barbados. Countries that Barbados has taxation agreements with include:

- Austria
- Botswana
- Canada
- China,
- CARICOM
- Cuba
- Finland
- Luxembourg
- Malta
- Mauritius
- Mexico
- Netherlands
- Norway
- Panama
- Seychelles
- Spain
- Sweden
- Switzerland
- The United Kingdom
- The United States
- Venezuela

Source: Barbados Government website containing the text of the majority of the above tax treaties

The bilateral tax treaty negotiated with Canada in particular has been a political-football for the government of that country. The treaty was made to allow the profits for IBCs and offshore banking companies to be repatriated to Canada tax-free after paying taxes in Barbados. The aim was mainly for companies like the Canadian Imperial Bank of Commerce (CIBC), Royal Bank of Canada (RBC), and Scotiabank, which (along with Barclays of the United Kingdom), when-combined control a healthy majority of Barbados's local Commercial Banking sector. In essence the treaty makes the economy of Barbados almost an unofficial part of the Canadian economy and it was aimed at allowing Canadian companies to extract profits back to Canada more easily.

== Sectors ==
=== Agriculture ===
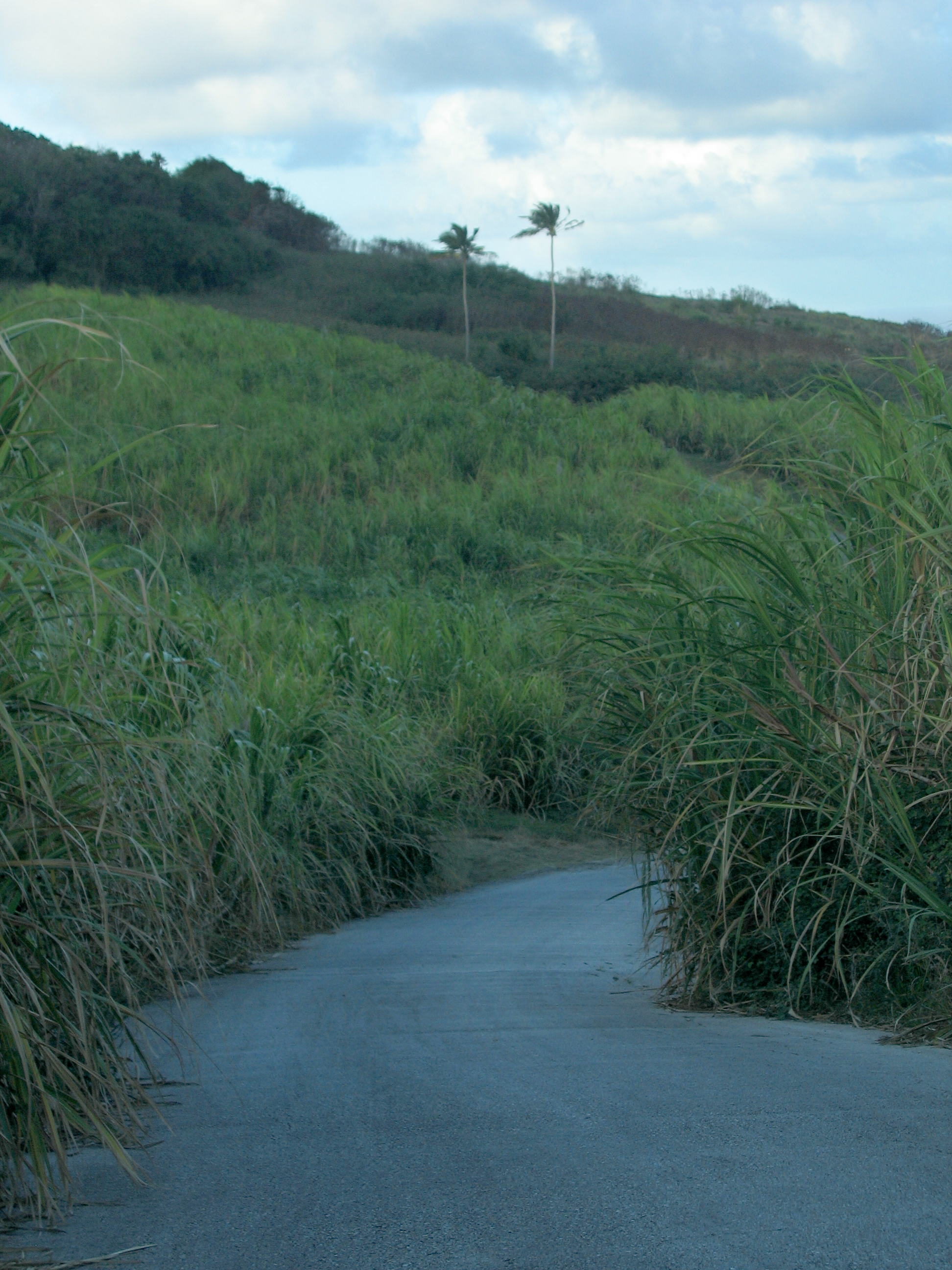
The cultivation of sugar cane, such as the cane growing in this field outside Saint Andrew, has always been a big part of the island's economy.

About 16,000 hectares (40,000 acres), or 37.2% of the total land area, are classified as arable. At one time, nearly all arable land was devoted to sugarcane, but the percentage devoted to ground crops for local consumption has been increasing. In 1999, 500,000 tons of sugarcane were produced, down from the annual average of 584,000 tons in 1989–91. In 2001, sugar exports amounted to US$22 million, or 8.4% of total exports. Major food crops ("Ground provisions") are yams, sweet potatoes, corn, eddoes, cassava, and several varieties of beans. Inadequate rainfall and lack of irrigation has prevented the development of other agricultural activity, although some vegetable farming takes place on a commercial scale. Some cotton is also grown in drier parts of the island, but until cotton can be picked by machine it is unlikely that output will rise to its former level.

=== Animal husbandry ===
Livestock rearing isn't a major occupation in Barbados, chiefly because good pasture has always been scarce & imported animal feed is expensive. The island must import large quantities of meat and dairy products. Most livestock is owned by individual households. Estimates for 1999 showed 23,000 head of cattle, 41,000 sheep, 33,000 hogs, 5,000 goats, and 4,000,000 chickens. Poultry production in 1999 included 9,000 tons of meat and 1,000 tons of hen eggs. Apart from self-sufficiency in milk and poultry, the limited agricultural sector means that Barbados imports large amounts of basic foods, including wheat and meat.

=== Construction ===
A construction boom, linked to tourism and residential development, has assisted the recovery of a large cement plant in the north of the island that was closed for some years and reopened in 1997.

=== Cruise industry ===
In 2006 the Central Bank governor of Barbados urged the Government to consider investing in a Barbadian cruise ship company. The government at that time did not invest in that opportunity but it is unknown if it will in future

=== Education ===
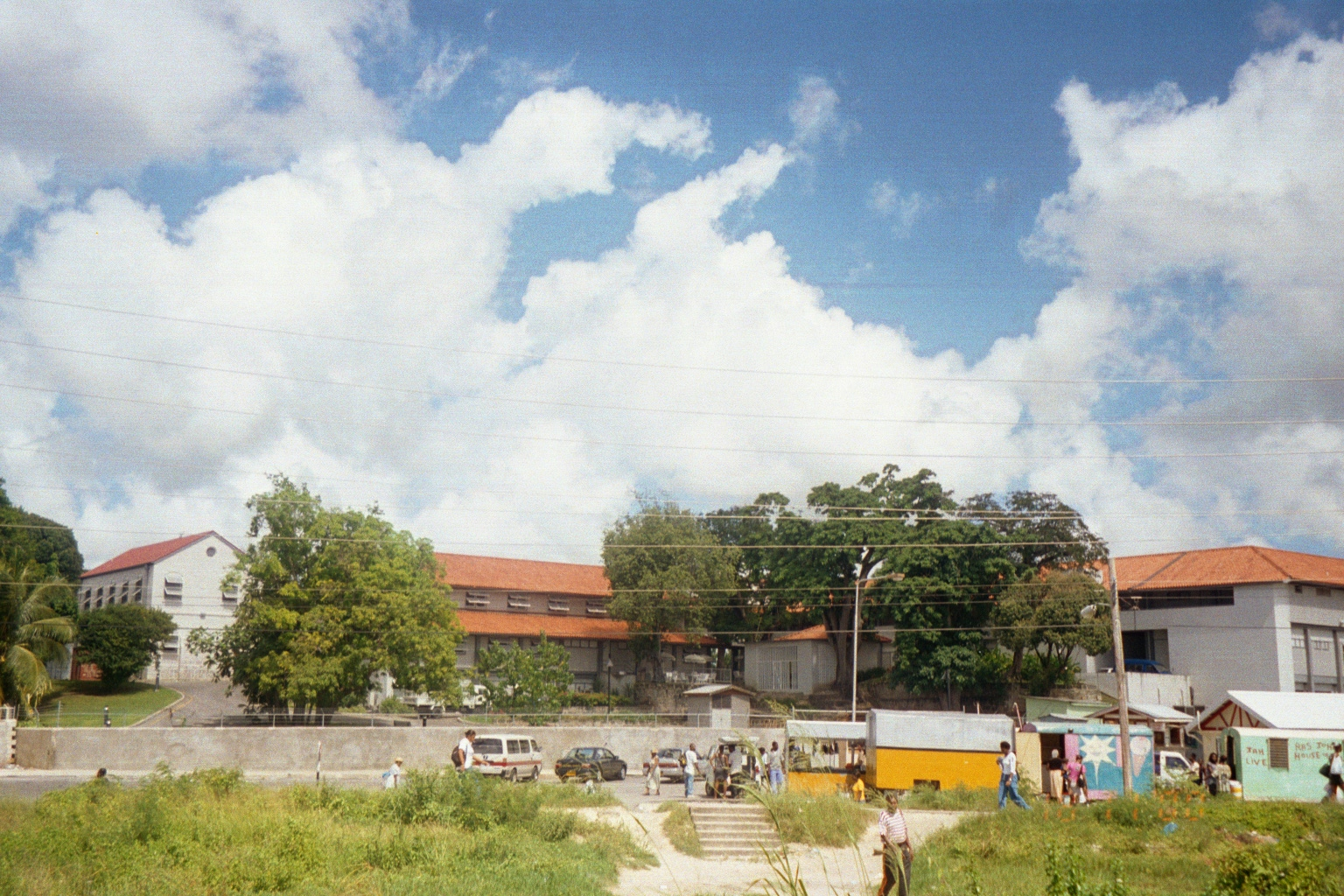
The Elsie Payne Complex at the Barbadian Ministry of Education.

Education in Barbados is based primarily on the British model. In the decades since independence most schools across the country have moved away from the Single-sex education framework and towards a more coeducational model. A number of offerings are available ranging from public or private accommodations in education to home schooling or boarding schools.

=== Energy ===
In 2019 Barbados spent BDS$728 million on fossil fuel imports. Following the Russian invasion of Ukraine in 2022, fossil fuel import expenditure increased to BDS$1.123 billion, before declining to approximately BDS$1.1 billion in 2023 and BDS$951 million in 2024.

=== Financial services ===
The international business and financial services sector continues to be an important contributor to the economy of Barbados. During fiscal year 2010/2011 the sector contributed approximately BBD$186 million in corporate taxes – almost 60% of the total corporate tax intake. At the end of December 2010, there were 45 offshore banks, 242 captive insurance companies, 3,065 international business companies, and 408 international societies with restricted liability. The financial sector is also under threat of sanctions from the EU and the Organization for Economic Cooperation and Development (OECD), both of which have expressed concerns about money laundering, tax evasion, and other financial improprieties in Caribbean offshore centres.

=== Fishing ===
The fishing industry employs about 2,000 persons, and the fleet consists of more than 500 powered boats. The catch in 2000 was 3,100 metric tons. Flying fish, dolphin fish, tuna, turbot, kingfish, and swordfish are among the main species caught. A fisheries terminal complex opened at Oistins in 1983.

=== Forestry ===
Fewer than 20 hectares (49 acres) of original forests have survived the 300 years of sugar cultivation. There are an estimated 5,000 hectares (12,000 acres) of forested land, covering about 12% of the total land area. Roundwood production in 2000 totalled 5,000 cu m (176,500 cu ft), and imports amounted to 3,000 cu m (106,000 cu ft). In 2000, Barbados imported $35.3 million in wood and forest products.

=== Healthcare ===
All Barbadian citizens are covered by universal health care at polyclinics and a single general hospital. Barbados ranked 37th out of 187 countries surveyed in the Human Development Index. According to the 2019 World Bank data, the life expectancy at birth in Barbados was 79 for men and 82 for women.

=== Informatics ===
Informatics employed almost 1,700 workers in 1999, about the same number as the sugar industry. The island has been involved in data processing since the 1980s and now specialises in operations such as database management and insurance claims processing. Costs in Barbados are higher than elsewhere in the Caribbean (although still only half of costs in the United States), but the island offers strong advantages such as a literate English-speaking workforce and location in the same time zone as the eastern United States. Despite these factors, employment has fallen in recent years, reflecting increasing mobility on the part of foreign companies, which frequently relocate to lower-cost areas.

=== Manufacturing ===
The manufacturing sector in Barbados has yet to recover from the recession of the late 1980s when many bankruptcies occurred and almost one-third of the workforce lost their jobs. Today, approximately 10,000 Barbadians work in manufacturing. The electronics sector in particular was badly hit when the U.S. semi-conductor company, Intel, closed its factory in 1986. Except for traditional manufacturing—such as sugar refining and rum distilling—Barbados's industrial activity is partly aimed at the local market, which produces goods such as tinned food, drinks, and cigarettes. Many industrial estates are located throughout the island. A cement factory is located in St. Lucy.

Export markets have been severely damaged by competition from cheaper Caribbean and Latin American countries. But domestic manufacturing also faces serious potential problems, as trade liberalisation means that the government can no longer protect national industries by imposing high tariffs on imported goods. Thus, Barbadian manufacturers must compete with other regional economies with lower wage costs and other overhead. The other significant industrial employer is the petroleum sector. Oil deposits are located in the southern parishes, but oil has not been produced in commercial quantities. The island's one small oil refinery closed in 1998 and moved refining to Trinidad and Tobago, where labour and other costs are cheaper. After oil products, rum is the second largest export produced by the country. Barbados has four commercial rum distilleries: West Indies Rum Distillery, Mount Gay Rum, Foursquare, and St Nicholas Abbey.

=== Mining ===
Deposits of limestone and coral were quarried to meet local construction needs. Production of limestone in 2000 amounted to 1.5 million tons. Clays and shale, sand and gravel, and carbonaceous deposits provided limited yields. Hydraulic cement production totalled 267,659 tons in 2000, up from 106,515 in 1996.

=== Oil and gas ===
Oil production is also undertaken in Barbados, with much of the on-shore activity taking place in Woodbourne, Saint Philip. As of 2025, Barbados was said to have about 257 onshore oil wells, although just 50 to 55 of them were operational. The oil and gas industry in the country is under Barbados National Oil Company (BNOC). As for gas production, BNOC CEO said that production covered about 30 percent of domestic need in 2025. BNOC was (2025) considering ways to enhance gas and oil production and extract more gas and oil resources from older wells.

=== Retail ===
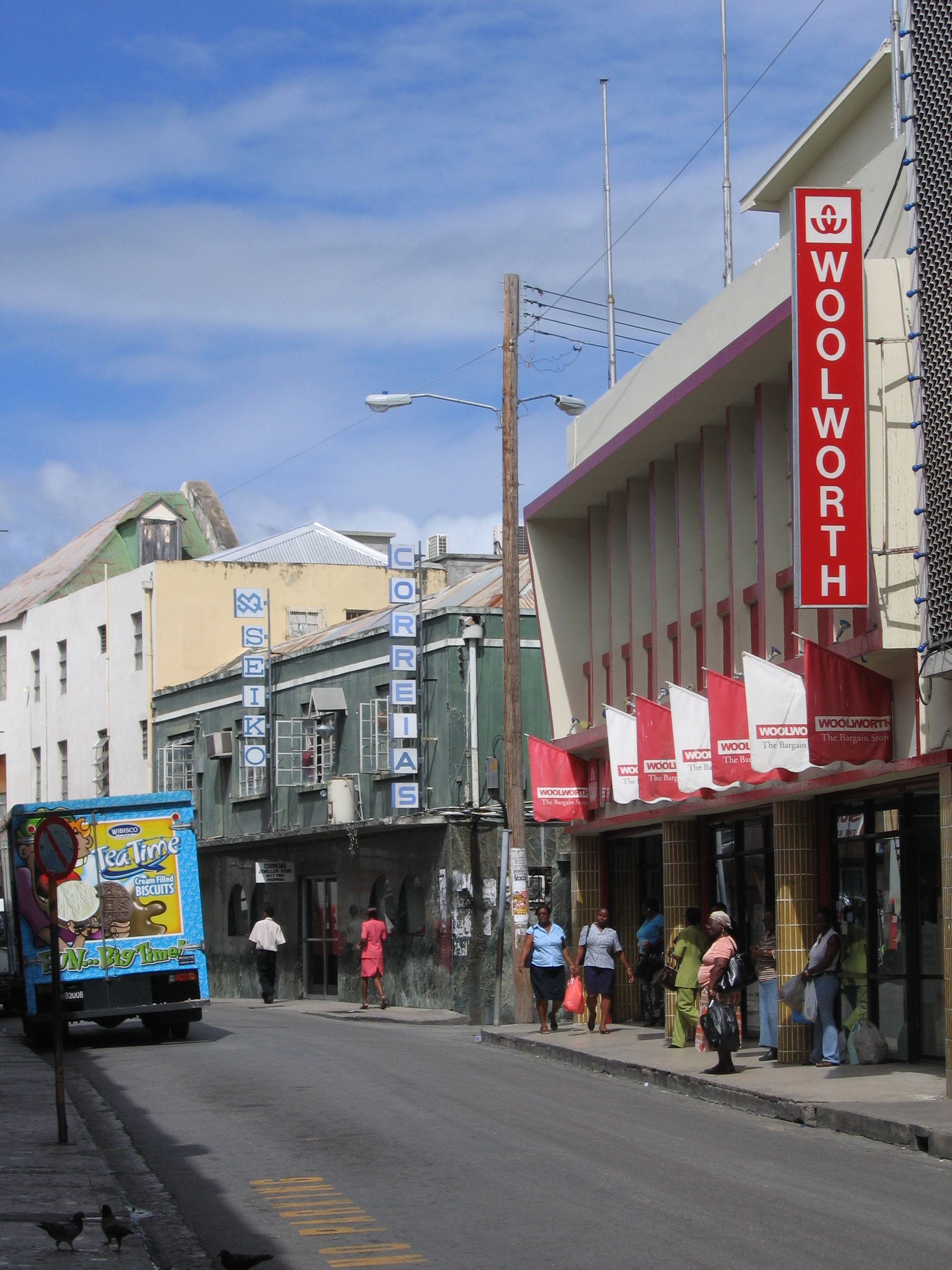
The independent Woolworth store on Prince William Henry Street, Bridgetown

Retailing is an important economic activity, especially in Bridgetown where there are large department stores and supermarkets. In the countryside, most stores are small and family-run. Some 18,000 people work in the retail sector.

=== Telecommunications ===
Communications in Barbados refers to the telephony, internet, postal, radio, and television systems of Barbados. Barbados has long been an informational and communications centre in the Caribbean region. Electricity coverage throughout Barbados is good and reliable. Usage is high and provided by a service monopoly, Barbados Light & Power Company Ltd. (a division of Canada-based Emera).

The International Telecommunication Union (ITU) call sign prefix allocated for all radio and television broadcasts in Barbados is 8P, and this replaced the former ZN and VP6 as a British territory.

=== Tourism ===
Tourism is Barbados's crucial economic activity and has been since the 1960s. At least 10 per cent of the working population (some 13,000 people) are employed in this sector, which offers a range of tourist accommodations from luxury hotels to modest self-catering establishments. After the recession years, tourism picked up again in the mid-1990s, only to face another slowdown in 1999. This drop was in part due to increasing competition from other Caribbean countries such as the Dominican Republic, and in part to a reduction in visits from cruise ships as they shifted to non-Caribbean routes or shorter routes such as the Bahamas. Cruise ship visitors totalled 445,821 in 1999, a reduction from 517,888 in 1997, but stay-over visitors rose to 517,869 in 1999, setting a new record. Overall, the country witnessed over US$700 million in tourism receipts in 1999.

A problem in Barbados is that tourist facilities are too densely concentrated on the south coast, which is highly urbanised, while the Atlantic coast—with a rugged shoreline and large waves—is not suitable for beach tourism. There are few large brand-name hotels, which makes marketing the island in the United States difficult. On the other hand, the absence of conglomerates and package tours results in more direct tourist spending among the general population.

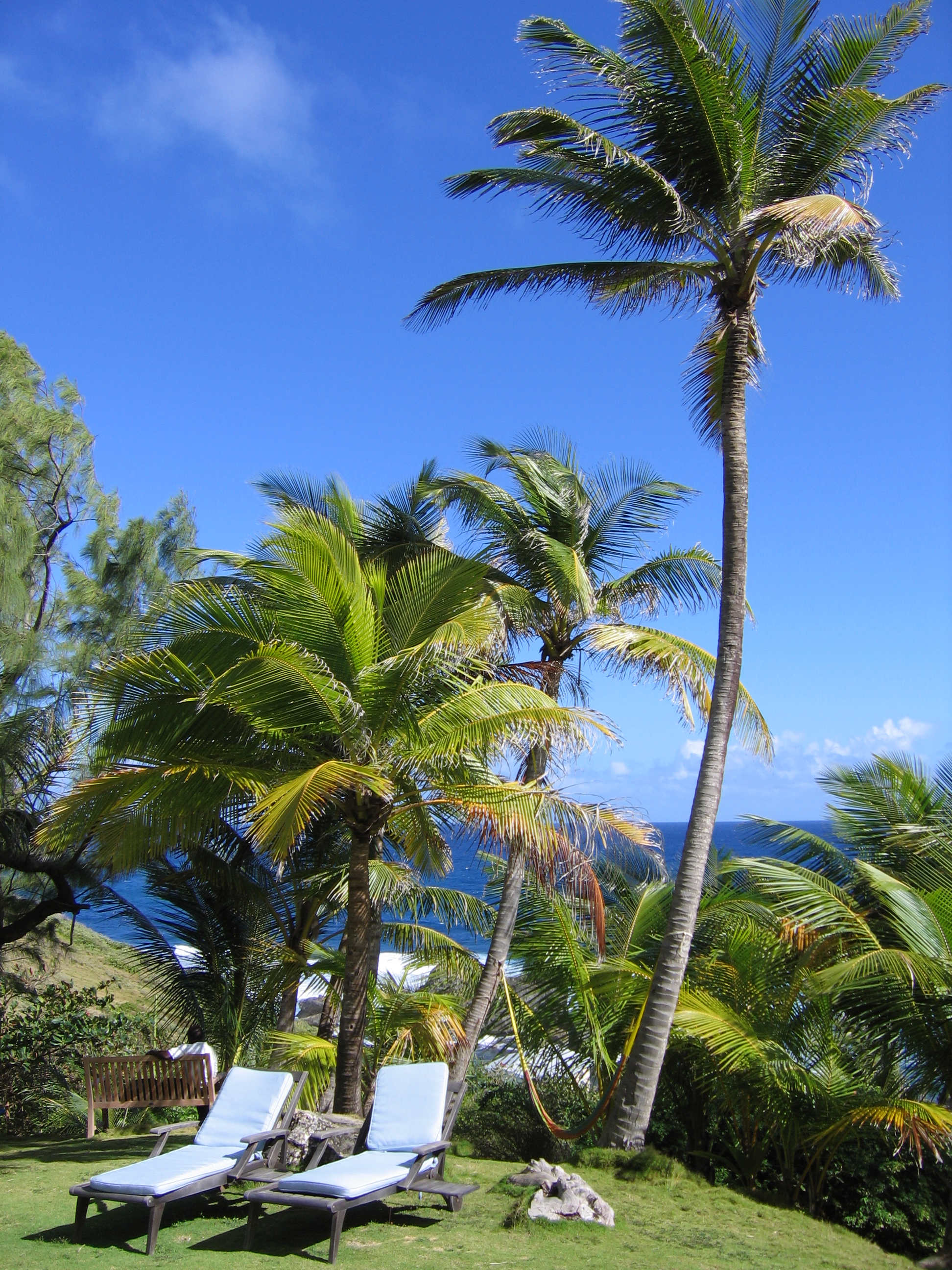
Bathsheba, Saint Joseph

Barbados has numerous internationally known hotels. Time-shares are available, and many smaller local hotels and private villas that dot the island have space available if booked in advance. The southern and western coasts of Barbados are popular, with the calm light-blue Caribbean Sea and their white and pinkish sandy beaches. Along the island's east coast, which faces the Atlantic Ocean, there are tumbling waves that are perfect for light surfing. Some areas remain risky to swimmers due to under-tow currents. The Crane beach was named one of the top 10 best beaches in the world.

Shopping districts are popular in Barbados, with ample duty-free shopping. There is also a festive night-life in mainly tourist areas such as the Saint Lawrence Gap. Other attractions include wildlife reserves (Graeme Hall Nature Sanctuary), jewellery stores, scuba diving, helicopter rides, golf, festivals (the largest being the annual Crop Over festival July/Aug), sightseeing, cave exploration (Harrison's Cave), exotic drinks and fine clothes shopping.

In August 2026, Barbados Tourism Marketing Inc. held its first Critical Incident Awareness & Response training workshop for tourism professionals with 130 tourism stakeholders trained in emergency response.

==== Attractions, landmarks and points of interest ====
Tourism accounts for almost one half of the economy. Name / Parish Location:

– Christ Church

- Graeme Hall Nature Sanctuary
- Saint Lawrence Gap
- Grantley Adams International Airport
- Chancery Lane Swamp
- Christ Church Foundation School (1809)
- Ocean Park, Barbados

– St. Andrew

- Chalky Mount potteries
- Cherry Tree Hill
- Morgan Lewis Windmill
- Barclays Park

– St. George

- Francia Great House
- Gun Hill Signal Station
- Orchid World

– St. James

- St. James Parish Church
- Folkestone Marine Park
- Lancaster Great House Gallery and Gardens
- Queen's College

– St. John

- Codrington College
- Conset Bay
- St. John Parish Church & church yard
- Massiah Street

– St. Joseph

- Andromeda Botanic Gardens
- Flower Forest
- Hackleton's Cliff
- Bathsheba

– St. Lucy

- Animal Flower Cave
- Little Bay
- Shamarra's House

– St. Michael

- Barbados Historical Museum
- Bridgetown Synagogue and Cemetery
- Bussa Emancipation Statue
- Ilaro Court
- Garrison Savannah
- Kensington Oval
- Mount Gay Rum
- Barbados National Museum
- George Washington House
- The Salvation Army Divisional Headquarters

– St. Peter

- Barbados Wildlife Reserve
- Farley Hill National Park
- St Nicholas Abbey

– St. Philip

- Crane Beach
- Sunbury Plantation
- Bayley's Plantation
- Foursquare Rum Distillery

– St. Thomas

- Clifton Hill Moravian Church
- Harrison's Cave
- Sharon Moravian Church
- Welchman Hall Gully

=== Transport ===
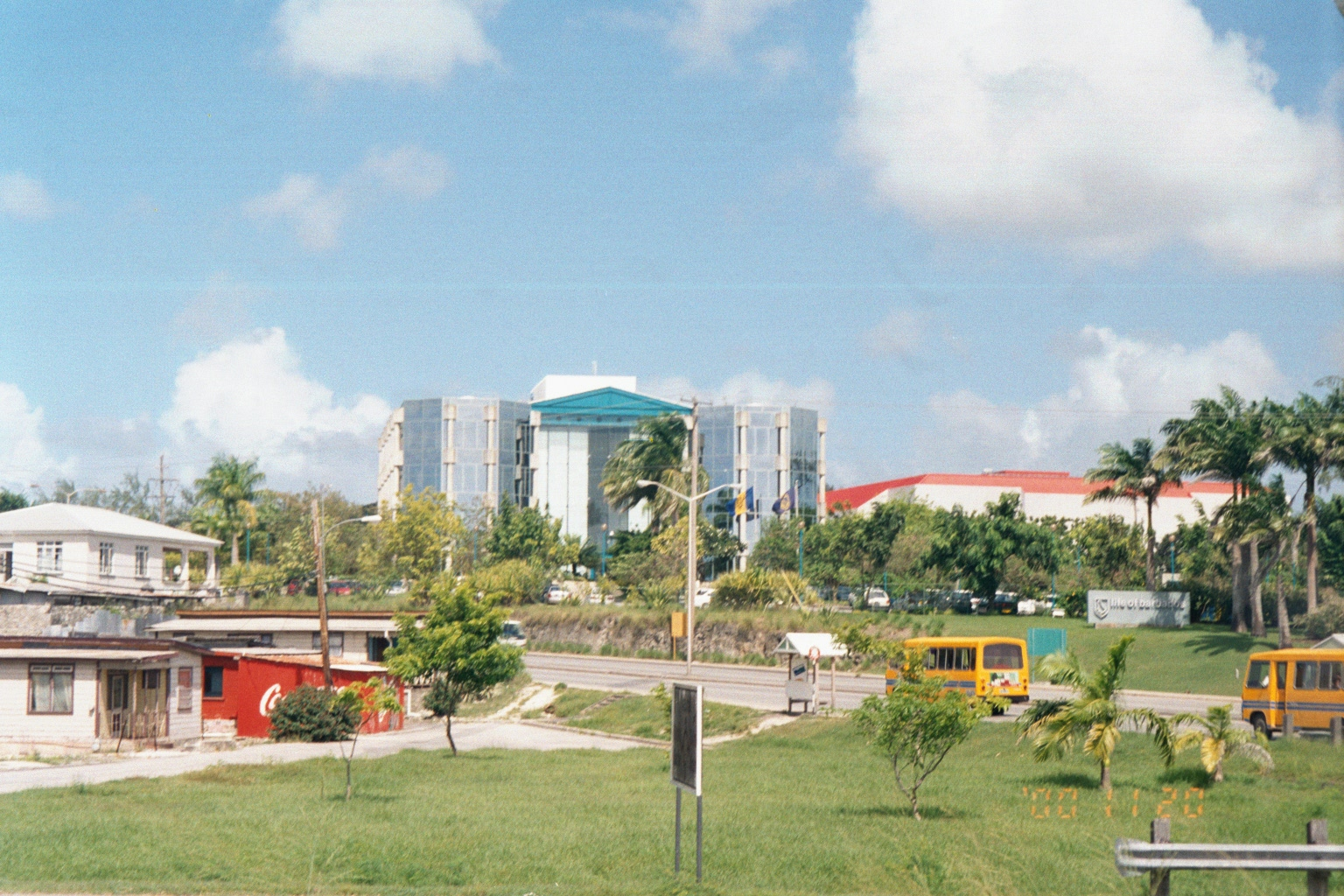
The two 1997 Hino ACME minibuses on the ABC Highway close to the Garfield Sobers Roundabout (sponsored by the then Mutual Life of Barbados; now Sagicor) on 20 November 2000.

Barbados is a relatively small country with a length of 21 miles (34 km) and a width of 14 miles (23 km). Barbados has 1,600 kilometres (990 mi) of public paved roads, two active marine ports in (Bridgetown Port and Port Saint Charles), remnants of a railway system, and one airport; the Sir Grantley Adams International Airport, located in Christ Church.

== Trade statistics ==
Exports of Barbados by product category (2019) Chemical products Transportation Machines Mineral products Plastics and rubbers Metals Foodstuffs Precious metals Textiles Instruments Animal products Vegetable products Paper goods Footwear and headwear Miscellaneous Stone and glass Wood products Animal and vegetable bi-products Animal hides Arts and antiques Weapons

2024 top Barbadian exports
| Product | Percentage | Exports value |
|---|---|---|
| Hard liquor | 0.2% | $84.6 (in million) |
| Refined petroleum | <0.005% | $36.9 (in million) |
| Packaged medicaments | 0.0058% | $28.3 (in million) |
| Passenger and cargo ships | 0.024% | $20.5 (in million) |
| Baked goods | 0.026% | $15.3 (in million) |

2024 top Barbadian imports
| Product | Percentage | Imports value |
|---|---|---|
| Refined petroleum | <0.005% | $520 (in million) |
| Crude petroleum | <0.005% | $234 (in million) |
| Cars | <0.005% | $111 (in million) |
| Packaged medicaments | 0.0058% | $42.9 (in million) |
| Passenger and cargo ships | 0.024% | $42.5 (in million) |

== Exchange rates ==
Barbadian dollar exchange rates with other regional and international currencies.

Current BBD exchange rates
| From Google Finance: | AUD CAD CHF CNY EUR GBP HKD JPY USD XCD GYD JMD |
| From Yahoo! Finance: | AUD CAD CHF CNY EUR GBP HKD JPY USD XCD GYD JMD |
| From XE.com: | AUD CAD CHF CNY EUR GBP HKD JPY USD XCD GYD JMD |
| From OANDA: | AUD CAD CHF CNY EUR GBP HKD JPY USD XCD GYD JMD |

== See also ==
- List of Barbadian companies
- List of companies listed on the Barbados Stock Exchange
- Barbadian dollar
- Barbados Port Incorporated
- Barbados Revenue Authority
- Central Bank of Barbados
- Ministry of Finance, Economic Affairs and Investment (Barbados)
- Ministry of Labour (Barbados)
- Economy of the Caribbean
- List of Commonwealth of Nations countries by GDP
- List of Latin American and Caribbean countries by GDP growth
- List of Latin American and Caribbean countries by GDP (nominal)
- List of Latin American and Caribbean countries by GDP (PPP)
