= Iris Bannochie =

Barbadian horticulturalist

- Born: 1914; Grenada
- Died: 1988 (aged 73–74); Barbados
- Other name: Iris Bayley
- Occupation: Horticulturist
- Known for: Gardener who was a self taught expert on the horticulture of Barbados

Iris Bannochie SCM (1914–1988) was a Barbadian horticulturalist who was the leading expert on horticulture on the island of Barbados.

== Life ==
Iris Bradshaw was born in Grenada in 1914 of Barbadian parents and apart from her early childhood, lived all her life in Barbados. She married Harry Bayley in 1935 (the founder of the Bayley Diagnostic Clinic, Beckles Road and memorialised in the Harry Bayley Observatory at Clapham). She worked very closely with her husband Dr. Harry Bayley building the Bayley Diagnostic Clinic and taking on the roles as Hospital Administrator and Laboratory Technologist.

Iris Bayley was a self taught scientist and published the definitive description of the unique embryology of the whistling frog which has no tadpole stage. Harry Bayley was seeing in his hospital lots of very sick children and discovered in a lot of cases "the child had caught a cold and was given Bush Tea to make them better". Iris was dispatched to investigate Bush Teas in Barbados. Her research is still widely quoted. It showed that most "Barbados Bush Teas" were highly toxic and could kill children. She also published research on the vitamin C content of the Barbadian cherry. She was a founding member of the Barbados National Trust, Chairman of the Parks and Beaches Commission (and its successor the National Conservation Commission) and for many years President of the Barbados Orchid Circle and the Barbados Horticultural Society (BHS). She travelled the world collecting exotic and beautiful plants and led the BHS in repeatedly winning gold and silver medals at the RHS Chelsea Flower Show in London and International Flower and Orchid shows. In 1977, she was awarded the Veitch Memorial Medal by the Royal Horticultural Society for her contribution to tropical horticulture.

In 1952 with her husband Harry Bayley they designed and built their bay-house Andromeda on 8 acres (32,000 m^{2}) of land in Saint Joseph, Barbados that had been in her family since 1740. Andromeda was situated on a hillside overlooking the rugged east coast of Barbados with Bathsheba to one side and Tent Bay the other.

The Bayley family commenced developing Andromeda Gardens in 1954. It started off as Iris Bayley's private botanical garden with flowering plants and tropical trees. The garden was formed around the bed of an ancient stream, surrounded by giant coral stone boulders. This was the inspiration for the house name, after the legend of the Greek maiden Andromeda, daughter of King Cepheus of Ethiopia (she was chained to a rock as a sacrifice to save her country from a monster and was rescued by Perseus who killed the monster and married her).

Iris Bayley's husband Harry Bayley died suddenly on 14 June 1958. In 1964 she re-married John Bannochie and together they continued to develop Andromeda Gardens.

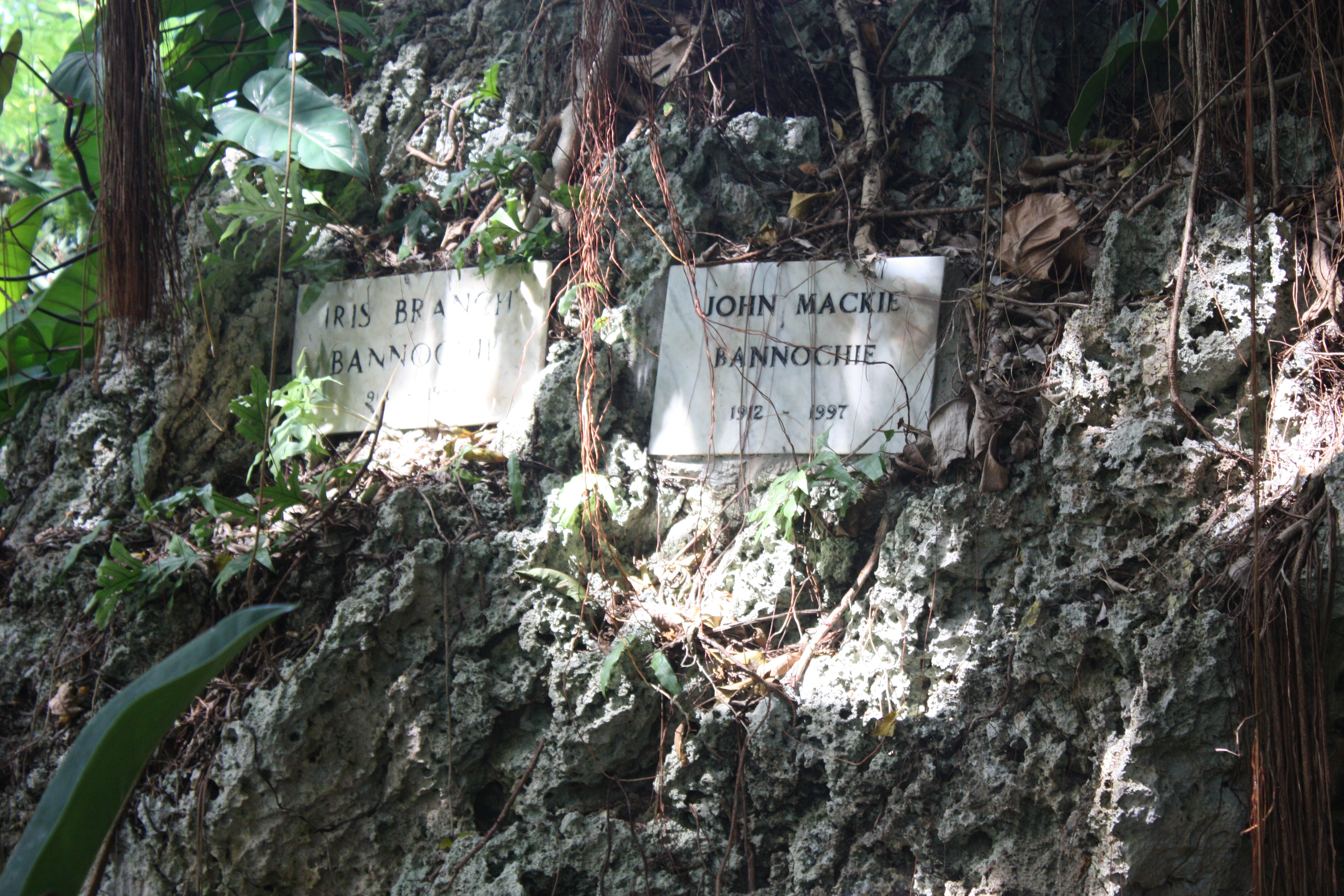
Headstones of Iris and John Bannochie in Andromeda Gardens

Bannochie suffered a stroke in the summer of 1988 and died shortly afterwards. She was 73 years old.

On Bannochie's death, Andromeda Gardens was left to the Barbados National Trust.

A heliconia cultivar is named after Bannochie – Heliconia stricta 'Iris Bannochie'.
