= Saint Thomas Parish =

Saint Thomas Parish may refer to:

- Saint Thomas, Barbados
- Saint Thomas Parish, Jamaica
