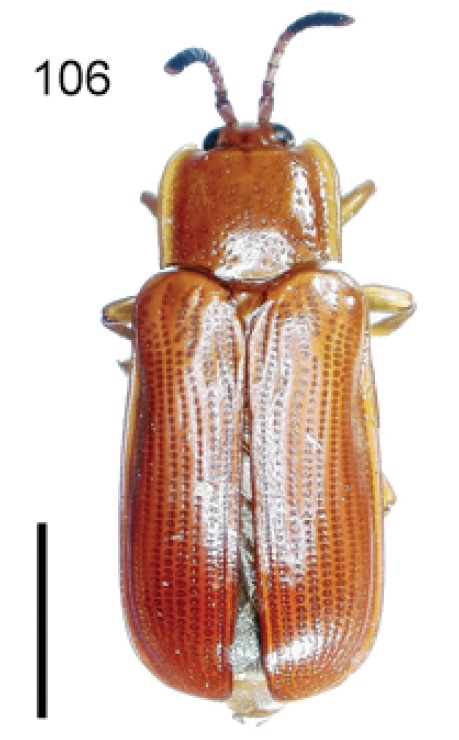

Scientific classification
- Kingdom: Animalia
- Phylum: Arthropoda
- Class: Insecta
- Order: Coleoptera
- Suborder: Polyphaga
- Infraorder: Cucujiformia
- Family: Chrysomelidae
- Genus: Cephaloleia
- Species: C. corallina

Binomial name
- Cephaloleia corallina Erichson, 1847

= Cephaloleia corallina =

Species of beetle

Cephaloleia corallina is a species of beetle of the family Chrysomelidae. It is found in Bolivia, Brazil (Amazonas, Minas Gerais, Pará, Rondonia), Colombia, Ecuador, French Guiana and Peru.

== Description ==
Adults reach a length of about 9–9.6 mm. Adults are bright shining red. Antennomeres 1–6 are red and 7–11 are black.

== Biology ==
Adults have been have been collected feeding on Calathea inocephala, Cephaloleia lutea and Heliconia stricta.
