= Hunte's Gardens =

Botanical garden in Saint Joseph, Barbados

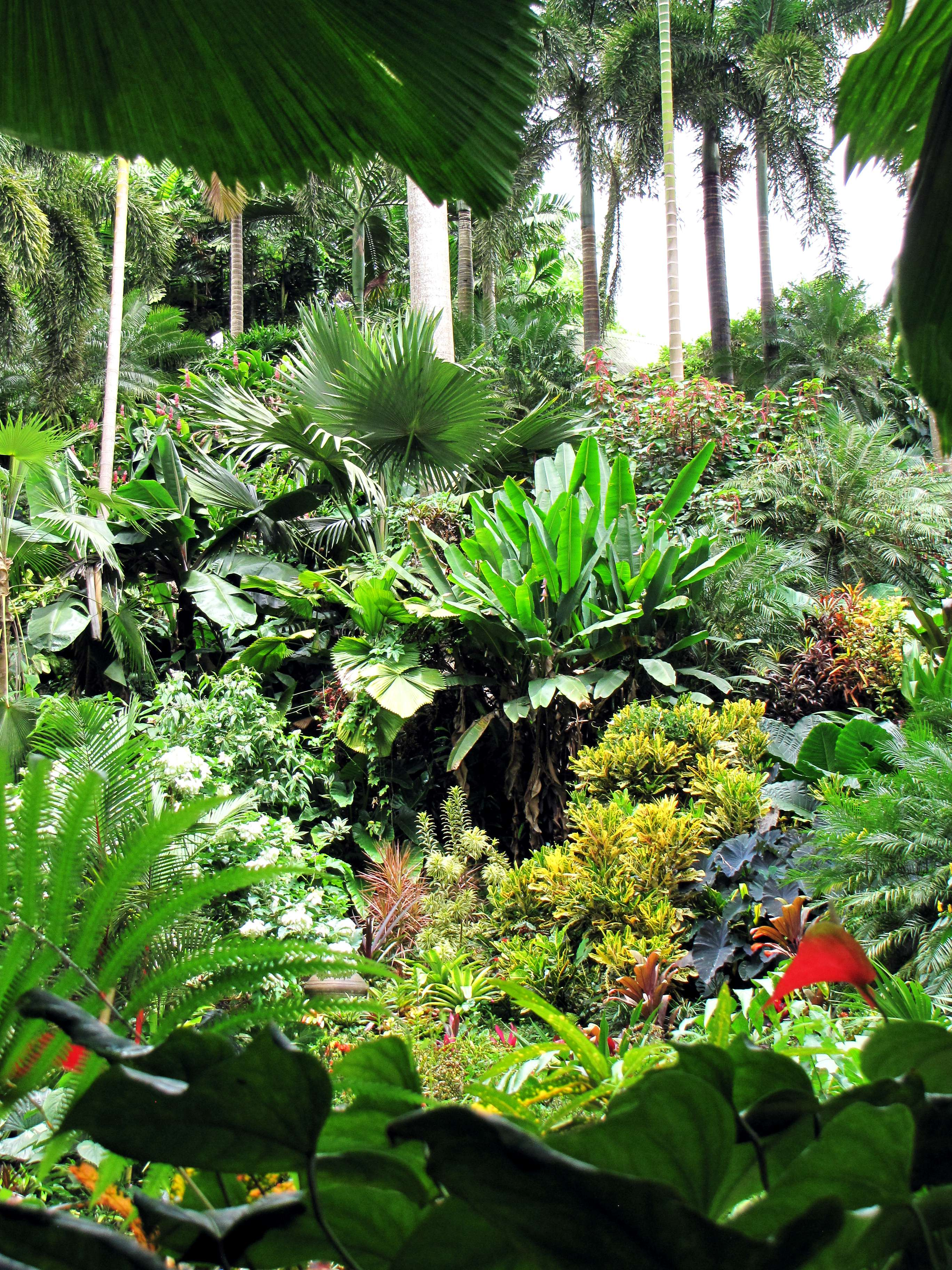
- Type: Botanical garden
- Location: Saint Joseph, Barbados
- Coordinates: 13°11′36″N 59°33′4″W
- Area: 10 acres
- Created: 1990
- Founder: Anthony Hunte
- Status: Open to the public
- Website: www.huntesgardens-barbados.com

Hunte's Gardens is a botanical garden in the parish of Saint Joseph in central Barbados. Located in a sinkhole-like gully, on land that was once a sugarcane plantation, the garden has developed into one of Barbados's most popular horticultural attractions. It was created by Anthony Hunte, a Barbadian horticulturist who began transforming the area in 1990 and opened the garden to the public in 2007.

== Creation and development ==
In the 1990s, horticulturist Anthony Hunte purchased ten acres of a former sugarcane plantation in Saint Joseph, in central Barbados. The garden is situated within a natural sinkhole-like gully, which provided Hunte a unique setting to begin developing his garden. He opened his garden to the public in 2007.

Hunte's Gardens is characterised by a multi-level environment consisting of winding footpaths, prominent clearings, and secluded resting areas. Hunte curated the garden with the goal of providing visitors with diverse plant groupings and themed garden rooms. It is designed to showcase a wide variety of tropical plants sourced from across the world, including royal palms, ginger lilies, heliconias, and bird-of-paradise flowers. In addition to its botanical features, the site retains elements of its colonial past, with stone buildings and structures that date back several centuries. The central structure of the garden is Hunte's residence, a converted stable filled with antique furnishings and open-air rooms that visitors may tour.

== Tourism ==
Hunte's Gardens has become a popular tourist destination in Barbados, frequented by visitors seeking alternatives to the island's many beaches and resorts. The garden has received multiple accolades, including Tripadvisor's "Best of the Best" award for two consecutive years.

The garden is also part of a wider trend of repurposing colonial-era properties for public and eco-tourism uses. Hunte has been recognised for his contributions to horticulture with the Barbados Centennial Honour (BCH).

In 2023, Hunte's Gardens entered into a partnership with Chukka Caribbean Adventures Ltd., a Jamaican-based nature and adventure tourism company. The partnership, which commenced on 1 November, aims to enhance the visitor experience while preserving the site's botanical integrity and character. Planned improvements include the construction of a new welcome center, expanded food and beverage services, and new tour offerings. A three-part documentary series on the history of the gardens and Hunte's personal journey was also reportedly in development.

== See also ==
- Andromeda Botanic Gardens – Botanical garden in St Joseph, Barbados
- Flower Forest – Botanical garden in St. Joseph, Barbados
- San Juan Botanical Garden – 300-acre urban garden in San Juan, Puerto Rico
- Saint Vincent and the Grenadines Botanic Gardens – Botanic Gardens of Kingstown, St. Vincent
