= Maizie Barker-Welch =

Barbadian MP and women's rights activist (died 2024)

Dame Maizie Irene Barker-Welch DBE (née Barker; 17 September 1927 – 28 August 2024) was a Barbadian woman's rights activist and member of parliament.

She was born Mazie Irene Barker into a family of clergy, the eldest of 12 children of Rev. Frank H. Barker, a schoolteacher, and his wife, Athalie Aurora Barker (née Padmore). Her younger brother, Rev. Frank A. Barker, and nephew the Rev. Kirk Barker, were also ministers.

A schoolteacher before entering politics, she taught at St. Bernard's School, St. Gabriel's School, The Foundation Girls School, the Ursuline Convent, and Codrington High School.

She was elected in 1986 as a member of the House of Assembly, and also served in the Senate and Cabinet. She was elected in the DLP landslide of 1986, representing the constituency of St Joseph. She was instrumental in the passage of the Domestic Violence (Protection Order) Act. She lost Re-election in 1991. She was President of the (Barbados) National Organisation of Women, and a patron of the Barbados Sea Turtle Project.

== Death and honours ==
Dame Maizie Barker-Welch died at the age of 96. The local media, Barbados Today, called her a "distinguished educator, politician, advocate for women’s rights, and influential public servant". Tributes were made by many, including Prime Minister Mia Mottley.

== Honours and awards ==
On 1 January 2014, for the New Year Honours, she was appointed as a Dame Commander of the Order of the British Empire (DBE) "for services to national, regional and international advocation for the rights of women." She was the only Barbadian appointed that year by Elizabeth II, in her right as Queen of Barbados, on advice of the Barbadian Government. She also "received an Honorary Doctor of Laws from the University of the West Indies."

== Personal life and death ==
The widow of Pedro Welch, she was survived by two sons, two daughters, and 11 grandchildren. Her funeral was held at Bank Hall, and was buried at the historic Clifton Hill Moravian Church.
