= Saint Thomas, Barbados =

Saint Thomas
- Parish
- Map of Barbados showing Saint Thomas
- Coordinates: 13.18°N 59.58°W
- Country: Barbados
- Largest city: Welchman Hall

Government
  - Type: Parliamentary democracy
  - Parliamentary seats: 1

Area
  - Total: 34 km^{2} (13 sq mi)

Population (2009census)
  - Total: 14,249
  - Density: 420/km^{2} (1,100/sq mi)
- ISO 3166 code: BB-11

The landlocked parish of St. Thomas is in the centre of Barbados. It is one of only two landlocked parishes in the island, the other being Saint George to the south.

Saint Thomas is represented in the House of Assembly of Barbados by Cynthia Forde.

The area of Sturges in St. Thomas contains a number of broadcast antennas for the island, including one which fell onto nearby properties in 2018.

== Geography ==
=== Populated places ===
There are no cities in St. Thomas. The central village of the parish is Welchman Hall. The eponymous St. Thomas Church is located west of Rock Hall on Highway 2A. The majority of the population lives in the extreme southwest of the parish, in the catchment area of Bridgetown. The biggest places there are Welches, Redmans and Arthur's Seat. Shop Hill, White Hill and Edgehill are centrally located in the southwest. Welchman Hall is in the center, Rock Hall in the West and Clifton Hill in the east. The north is sparsely populated.

The parish contains the following major villages:

- Arthurs Seat
- Bridgefield
- Clifton Hill
- Dunscombe
- Edgehill
- Hopewell
- Redmans
- Rock Hall
- Shop Hill
- Welchman Hall
- Welches
- White Hill

Smaller villages and hamlets are:

- Bagatelle
- Bennetts
- Bibbys Lane
- Bloomsbury
- Blunts
- Canefield
- Carrington
- Christie
- Clifton
- Content
- Dukes
- Endeavour
- Farmers
- Fisherpond
- Highclere
- Lion Castle
- Mount Misery
- Mount Wilton
- Porey Spring
- Proutes
- Rugby
- Strong Hope
- Walkes Spring

=== Parishes bordering Saint Thomas ===
- Saint Andrew - Northeast
- Saint George - Southeast
- Saint James - West
- Saint Joseph - East
- Saint Michael - Southwest

== Education ==
In 1997, the Government of Barbados under the Ministry of Education in an attempt to create more spaces for the increase in entrants into secondary schools, opened the St. Thomas Secondary School, the precursor of the Lester Vaughan Secondary School, named after a distinguished Barbadian who assisted in the transformation of the educational sector as well as wrote the National Pledge of Barbados. To date, the Lester Vaughan School is the youngest secondary school and one of the most technologically advanced in the island.

The Barbados Association for Children With Intellectual Challenges operates the Challenor School for both children and adults with mental retardation.

== Places of interest ==
- Clifton Hill Moravian Church
- Sharon Moravian Church
- Harrison's Cave

== Politics ==
Saint Thomas covers one geographical constituency for the House of Assembly:

- St. Thomas
