= Barbados Revenue Authority =

Government agency in Barbados

Agency overview
- Formed: 1 April 2014
- Preceding agency: Merger of the Inland Revenue and Land Tax Departments and the Value Added Tax (VAT) & Excise Divisions of the Customs and Excise Department
- Jurisdiction: Barbados
- Headquarters: Roebuck Street, Barbados
- Agency executive: Sandra Osbourne, Chairman; Jason King, Revenue Commissioner
- Parent department: Ministry of Finance, Economic Affairs and Investment
- Website: https://bra.gov.bb

The Barbados Revenue Authority is a statutory corporation of the Barbadian government that is a revenue service responsible for collecting revenue and taxes. It also provides other functions such as revenue and cashiering for the Barbados Licensing Authority and the Customs Department respectively. It was established on April 1, 2014, by the Barbados Revenue Authority Act, 2014-1 as a merger between Inland Revenue and Land Tax Departments and the Value Added Tax (VAT) & Excise Divisions of the Customs and Excise Department. It has four divisions: Income Tax Division, Income Tax (Automatic Exchange of Information), Division Land Valuations Division and the Value Added Tax Division.

The BRA is housed under the portfolio of the Barbados Ministry of Finance.

== See also ==
- Economy of Barbados
- Revenue service
- List of financial supervisory authorities by country
