= Hopewell, Saint Thomas =

Settlement in the Barbados

Coordinates: 13°10′27″N 59°34′58″W

Hopewell is a settlement in Saint Thomas Parish, Barbados.

Hopewell has an estimated population of approximately 100-150 inhabitants; however, actual data cannot be found.

== Location and geography ==
Hopewell lays between Vaucluse and Welchman Hall on Barbados' central plateau.

Hopewell lays around 9 km from Bridgetown and about 5 km from the coast.

It takes around 30 minutes to go from Grantley Adams International Airport to Hopewell.
