= Saint Lawrence Gap =

Settlement of Christ church parish, Barbados

Coordinates: 13.0700°N 59.5714°W

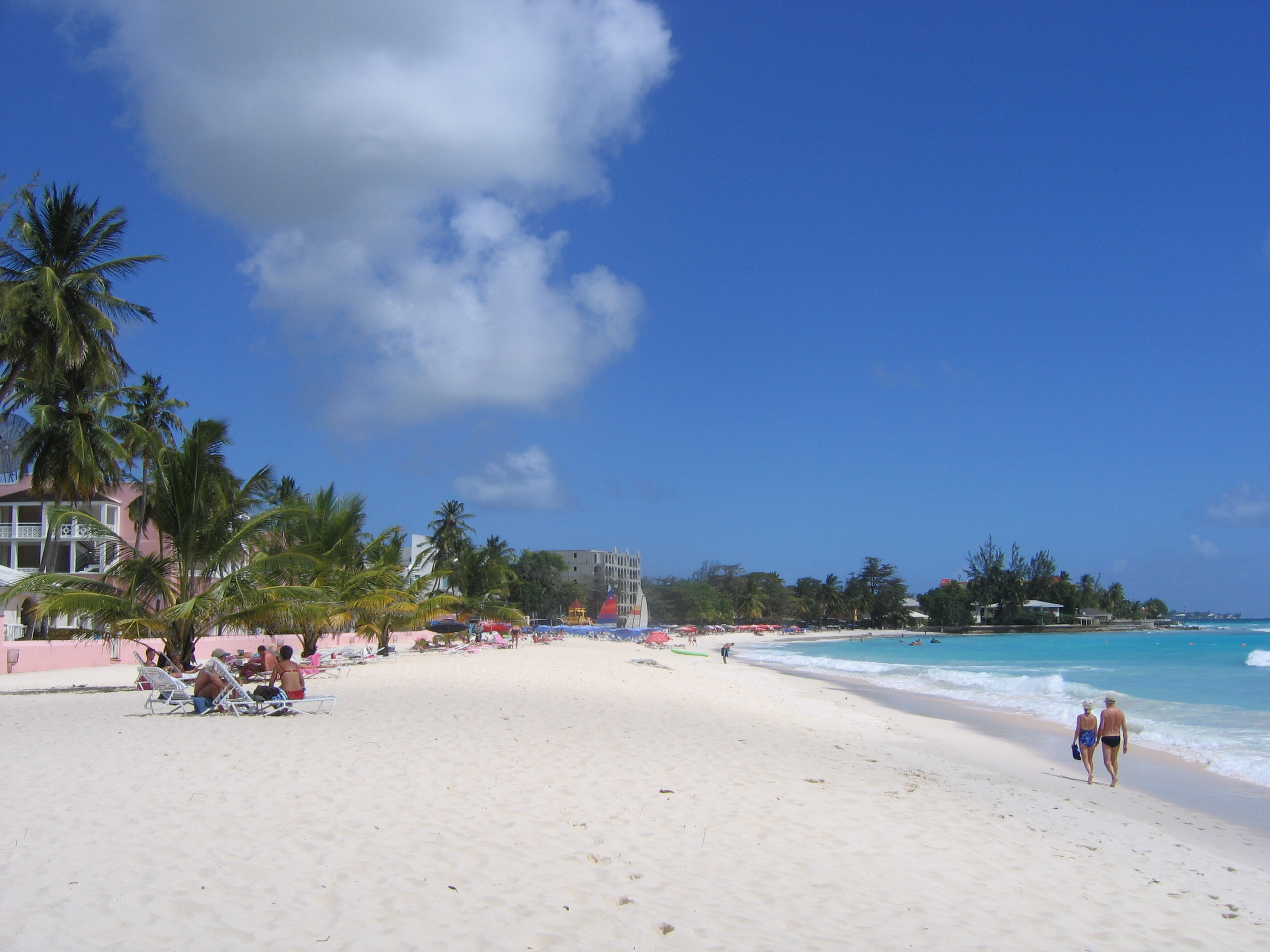
The beach at Saint Lawrence Gap

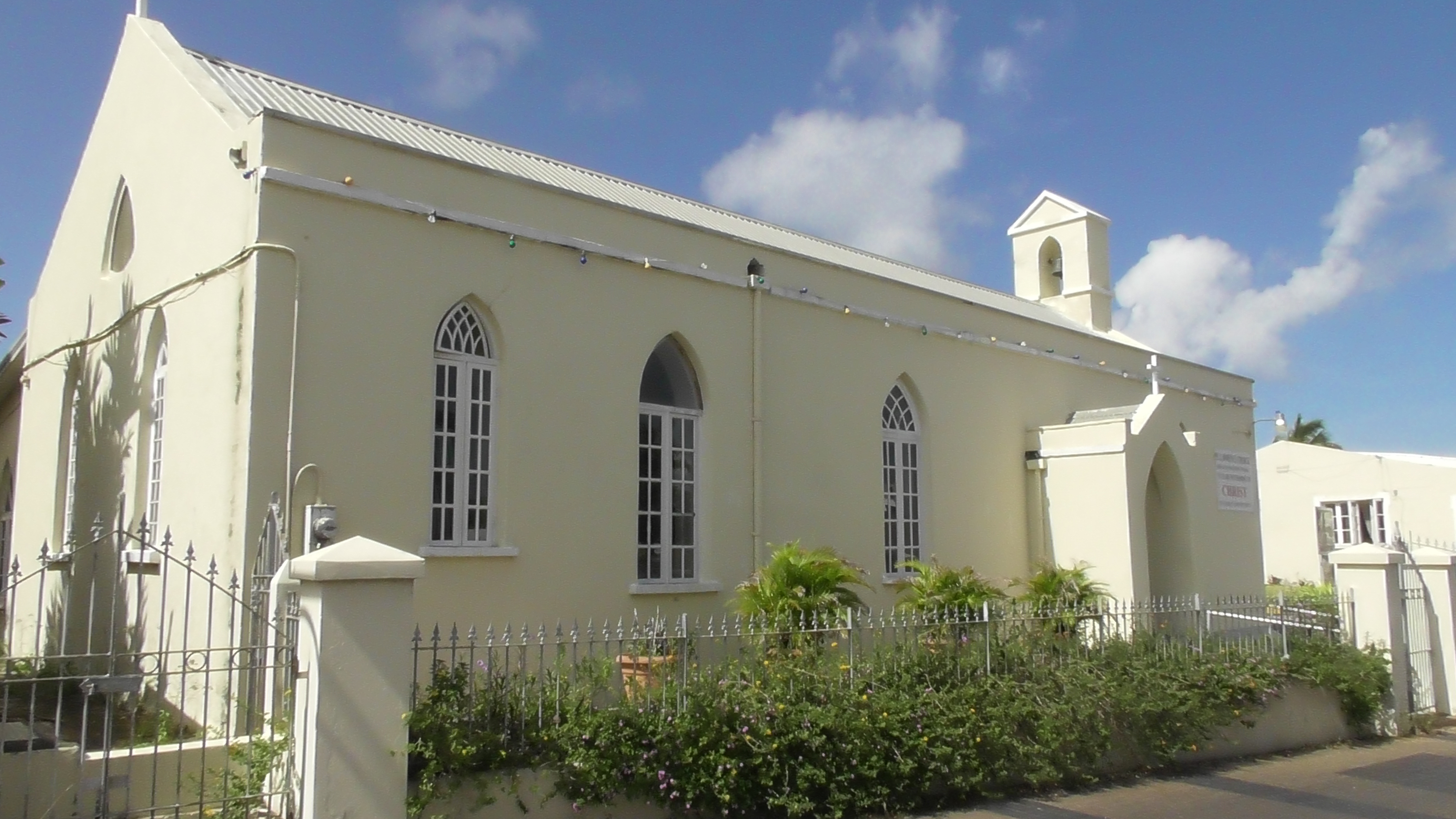
St. Lawrence Church.

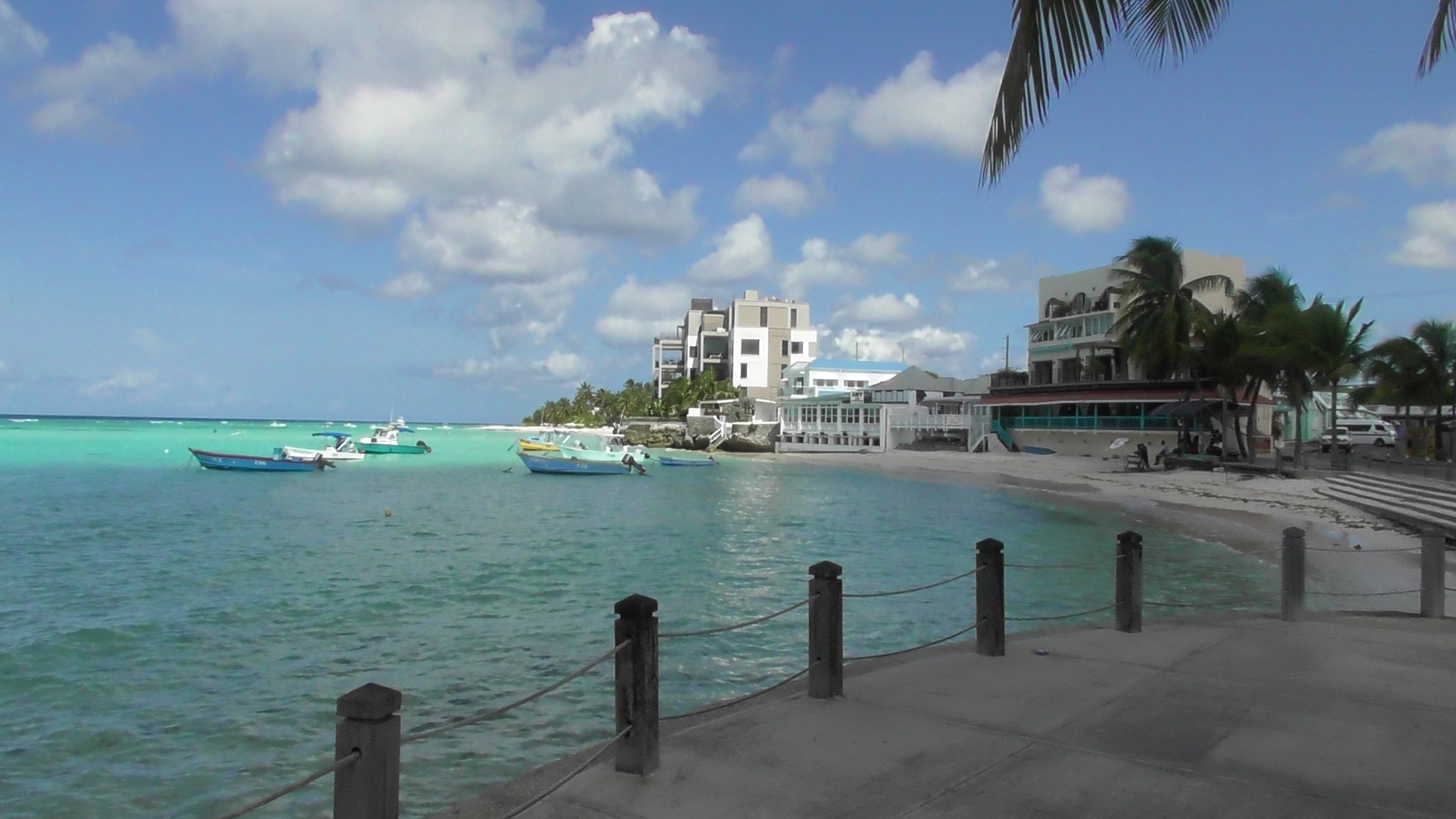
A small cove in St. Lawrence Gap with fishing boats.

Saint Lawrence Gap, Christ Church is a neighbourhood in Barbados. Often known as "the Gap", Saint Lawrence Gap is located on the southern coast of Barbados along the island's Highway 7. Found between Oistins to the east and Worthing to the west, it features a 1.5-kilometer stretch of bars, hotels, dance clubs, restaurants, inns, resorts, and shops along a white powdery-sand beachfront. It is situated roughly 5 km southeast of the capital city Bridgetown.

The area has been upgraded in recent years as part of the government's Urban Renewal and Development programme. Upgrades included a new boardwalk, street lighting, road paving and re-development of the Dover Beach area (new beach facilities and food and shopping kiosks).

The neighbourhood has one small church: St. Lawrence by the Sea. There are larger hotels at the eastern end of the neighbourhood, including a Sandals resort and other large hotels such as the Divi Southwinds and Turtle Beach, while the bars and restaurants are to a heavier concentration to the area's western end. There is a small minimarket in the centre of St. Lawrence Gap and one to its eastern end. Scotiabank have a branch in the centre of the resort. To the eastern end of Saint Lawrence Gap, there is a playing field.

== Culture ==
The Congaline Carnival was a nine-day carnival held in the area of Dover Beach, in Saint Lawrence Gap. The Carnival was held annually at the end of April. It was first held in 1994 and celebrated its last year in 2004. The carnival included local musicians, street activities, markets, and exhibitions, as well as free entertainment.
