= Cbonds =

Financial market data vendor in the United Arab Emirates

- Type: LLC
- Industry: Financial data vendor
- Founded: 2000
- Headquarters: United Arab Emirates
- Key people: Sergey Lyalin, CEO and Founder
- Website: www.cbonds.com

Cbonds is a financial market data vendor covering global bonds, equities and ETFs. Cbonds core business is to provide the financial market data via website Cbonds.Com as well as API solutions and mobile application. Since 2018 the global headquarter is based in United Arab Emirates with offices in more than 10 countries.

== History ==
The group’s history began in 2000. The Company was founded by Sergey Lyalin. Initially Cbonds was focused on the bond market only, then in 2020 global coverage for equities was added, and in 2021 the coverage was expanded with ETFs. Currently Cbonds also covers global macroeconomic data and corporate financial reports.

In 2021 Cbonds launched Research Hub, which is now one of the largest free research hubs in the world. Currently more than 250 research providers including banks, asset managers, rating agencies are providing their materials to Cbonds Research Hub. The instruments covered are bonds, equities, currencies, commodities, macro.

=== Coverage ===
Cbonds covers more than 650 000 outstanding bonds in 180+ countries. Equity coverage is of 75 000 stocks, funds coverage contains more than 10 000 mutual funds and ETF’s. Pricing data are sourced from over 400 providers among stock exchanges and OTC market participants.

== Information projects ==
The website Сbonds.com covers the fixed income in the developed and emerging markets. The project offers an extensive database on all debt securities, a newswire. and fixed income market research:

- Cbonds bonds
- Cbonds equities
- Cbonds ETF
- Cbonds derivatives
- Cbonds indices
- Cbonds global macro
- Cbonds Research

== Cbonds indices ==
Cbonds has developed groups of bond indices allowing to assess bond price and yield levels in various market segments.

Euro-Cbonds Emerging Market Indices have been calculated by Cbonds since 01.01.2010. The indices show price dynamics and yield on the EM sovereign Eurobond portfolio in USD. The underlying bond issues must be worth no less than US$2bn, traded no less than 12 days per month and rated at least by one international rating agency (BB-/Вaa3 or higher). The list of underlying securities is reviewed on a monthly basis. Currently these indices are calculated for major EM countries (Brazil, India, China, Indonesia, Mexico and others), and also composite indices for regions (Asia, Africa, LatAm, CEE) and global EM universe.

Cbonds corporate bond indices are calculated for USD-denominated corporate Eurobonds. These indices are calculated for each country, and also composite indices for regions and global EM universe. For some countries (United States, Brazil, Italy, Canada) corporate indices are calculated as well for investment grade and high yield segment.
