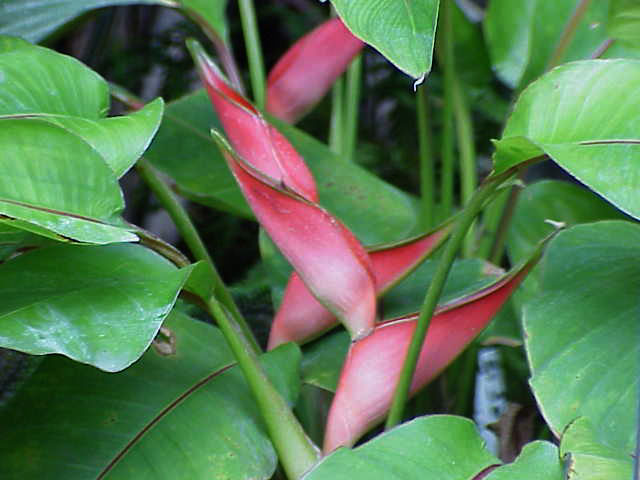

Scientific classification
- Kingdom: Plantae
- Clade: Tracheophytes
- Clade: Angiosperms
- Clade: Monocots
- Clade: Commelinids
- Order: Zingiberales
- Family: Heliconiaceae
- Genus: Heliconia
- Species: H. stricta

Binomial name
- Heliconia stricta Huber

Synonyms
- Bihai stricta (Huber) Griggs; Heliconia tricolor Abalo & G.Morales

= Heliconia stricta =

Species of plant

Heliconia stricta is a species of flowering plant in the family Heliconiaceae. It is native to Brazil, Colombia, Venezuela, Ecuador, Peru, Bolivia, Guyana, Suriname, reproducing by seeds and by underground rhizomes. It is reportedly naturalized in Cuba and Puerto Rico, and cultivated as an ornamental in many other warm regions. The young leaves and bracts retain water, forming pools called phytotelmata, which provide habitat for diverse invertebrates.

Some common cultivated varieties are:

- Bucky
- Dwarf Jamaican
- Fire Bird
- Iris Bannochie
- Oliveira's Sharonii
- Tagami
