= Animal Flower Cave =

Sea cave in Barbados

Coordinates: 13°20′05″N 59°36′47″W

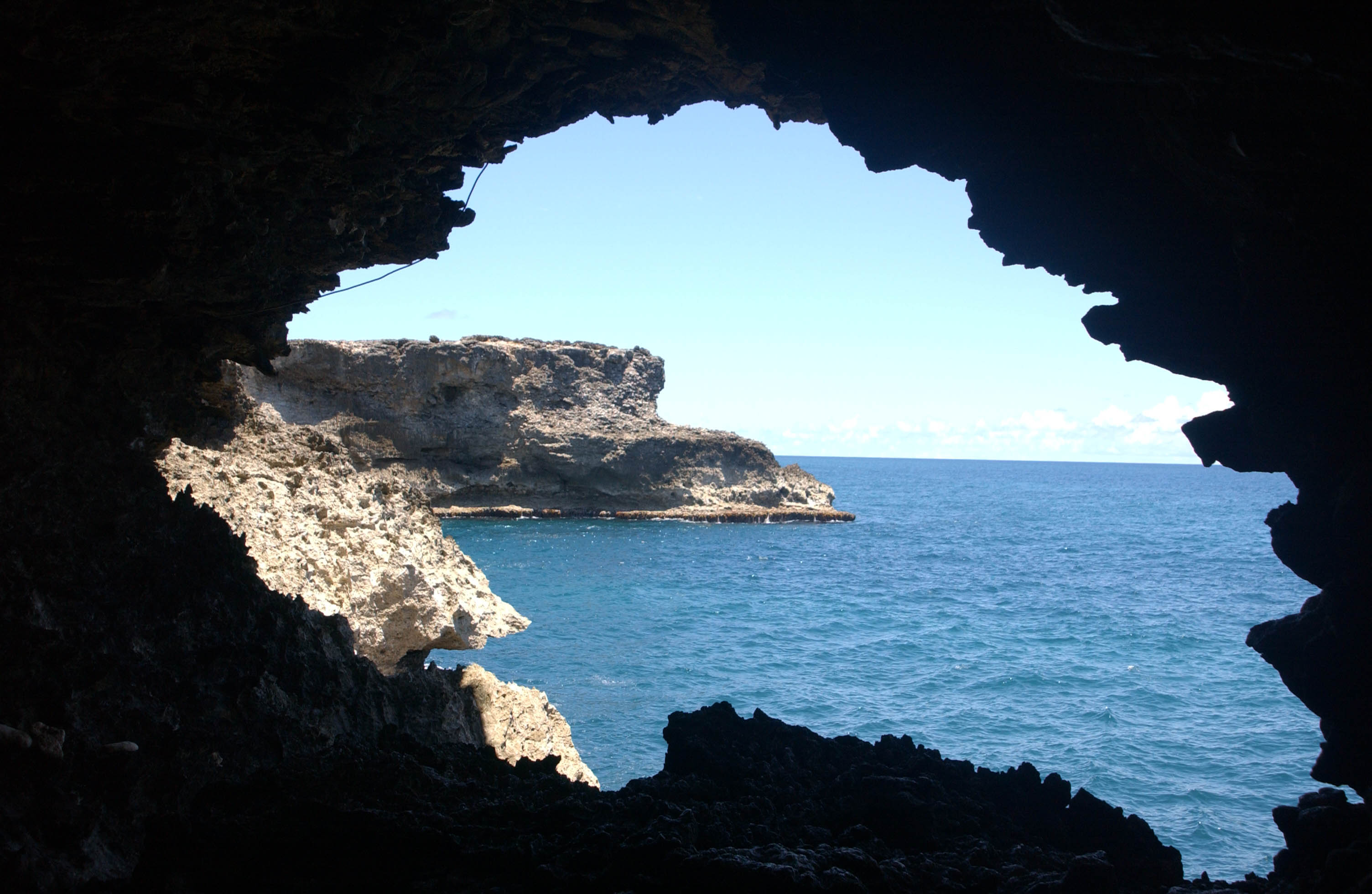
View from inside the cave looking out to the ocean

The Animal Flower Cave is located under the cliffs at North Point, St. Lucy, Barbados. It is the island's lone accessible sea cave. It was discovered by its seaward entrance in 1780 by two English explorers. The cave stands six feet above the high water mark although it was formed at sea level. This has occurred because Barbados is rising at 1 inch per 1000 years.

There are coral steps which lead down through an opening in the roof (called "the blowhole") into the cave, these steps were built in 1912. Inside the cave, still found are some sea anemones, which are locally called animal flowers, whence the cave obtained its name.

== Sea Anemone ==
The flower consists of tentacles that can sting and paralyze a passing fish in the larger variety of species. The tentacles retract into the stalk or stump for safety on contact with an alien object like a stick. The flower then waits a while before coming out of the stalk again to allow danger to pass.

== Cave's floor ==
The cave has a coral floor which is estimated to be about 400,000 to 500,000 years old. Whereas the younger coral section above the main floor is about 126,000 years old. This dating was carried out by the German Geological Institute. The swimming pool, as the guides call it, is in a chamber all by itself. The transparent and still water does not reveal its depth but looks deceptively shallow. The smooth floor of the cave, worn down by the water and the rubbing action of the coral rocks over time, has an undulating formation and the light lends a "magical quality" to this chamber. At certain times of the year and in bad weather, the caverns become filled with water and the entrance acts like a giant blowhole.

On calm days it is possible to swim in the natural rock pools in the cave or to view the Atlantic Ocean through the windows to the ocean (cave openings).
