= Graeme Hall Nature Sanctuary =

Eco-tourism site in Barbados

Coordinates: 13°4′19″N 59°34′40″W

Designations

Ramsar Wetland
- Official name: Graeme Hall Swamp
- Designated: 12 December 2005
- Reference no.: 1591

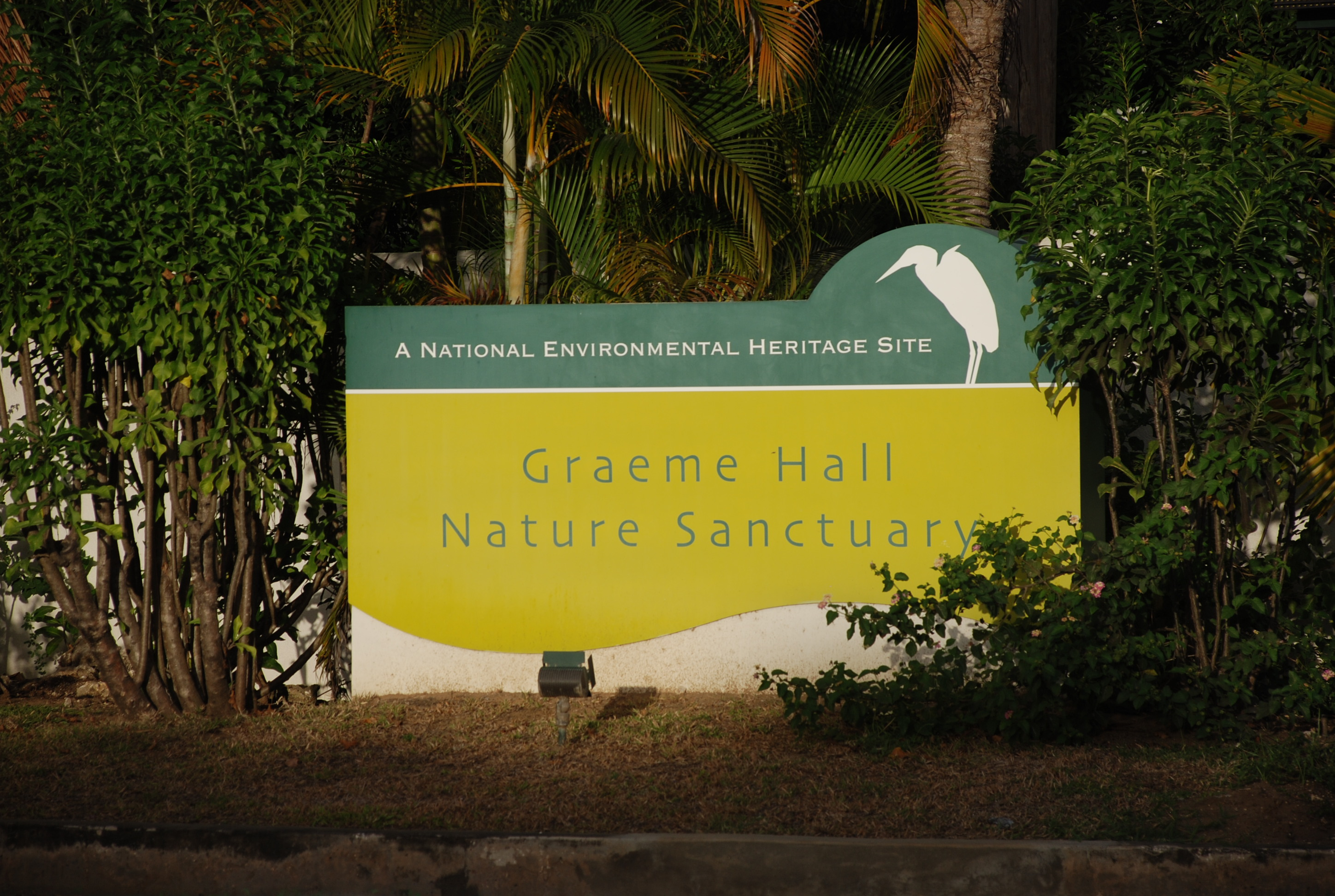
Graeme Hall Sanctuary - Entrance

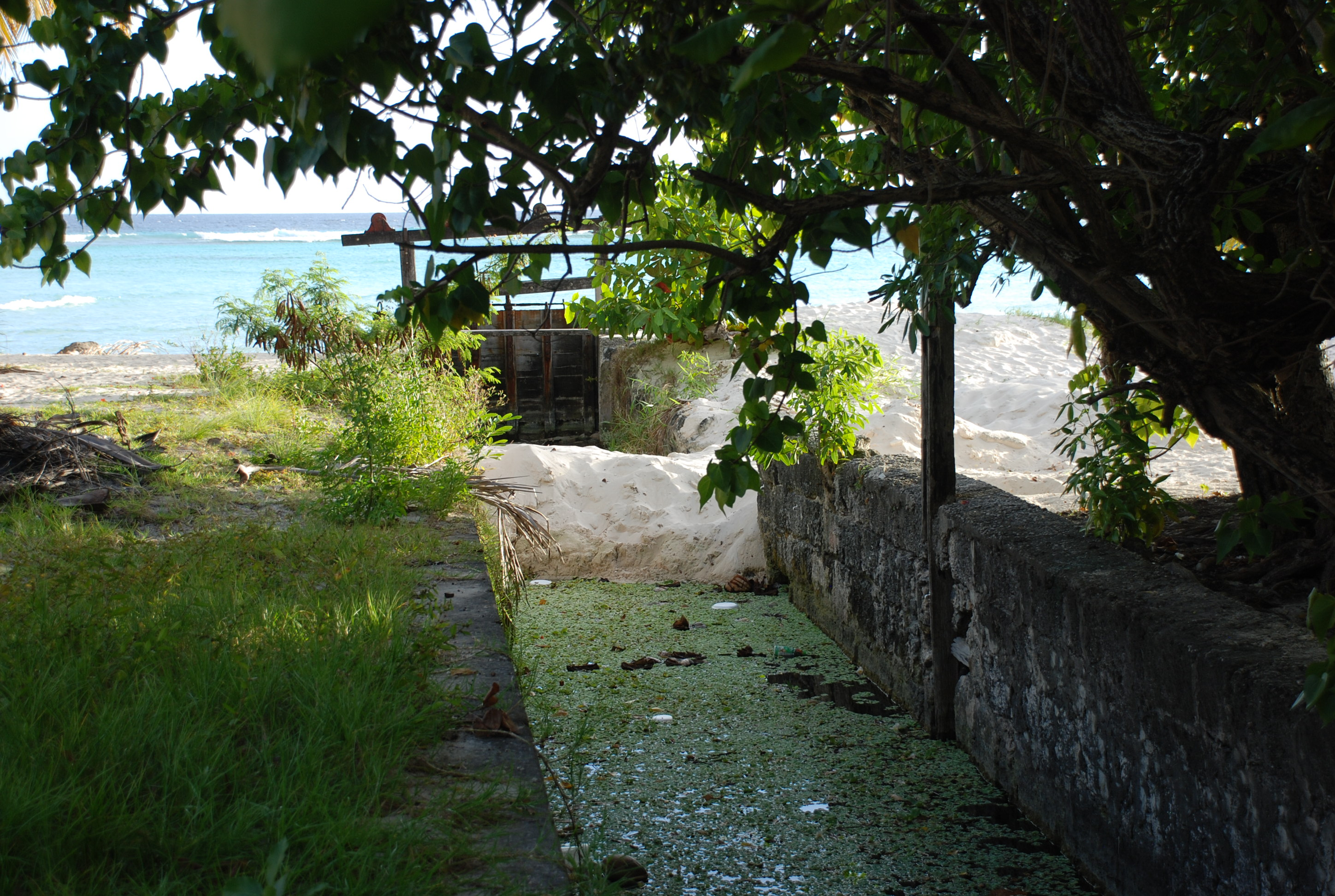
The government channel and sluice - that has been deliberately closed and damned to stop the sea from replenishing the swamp.

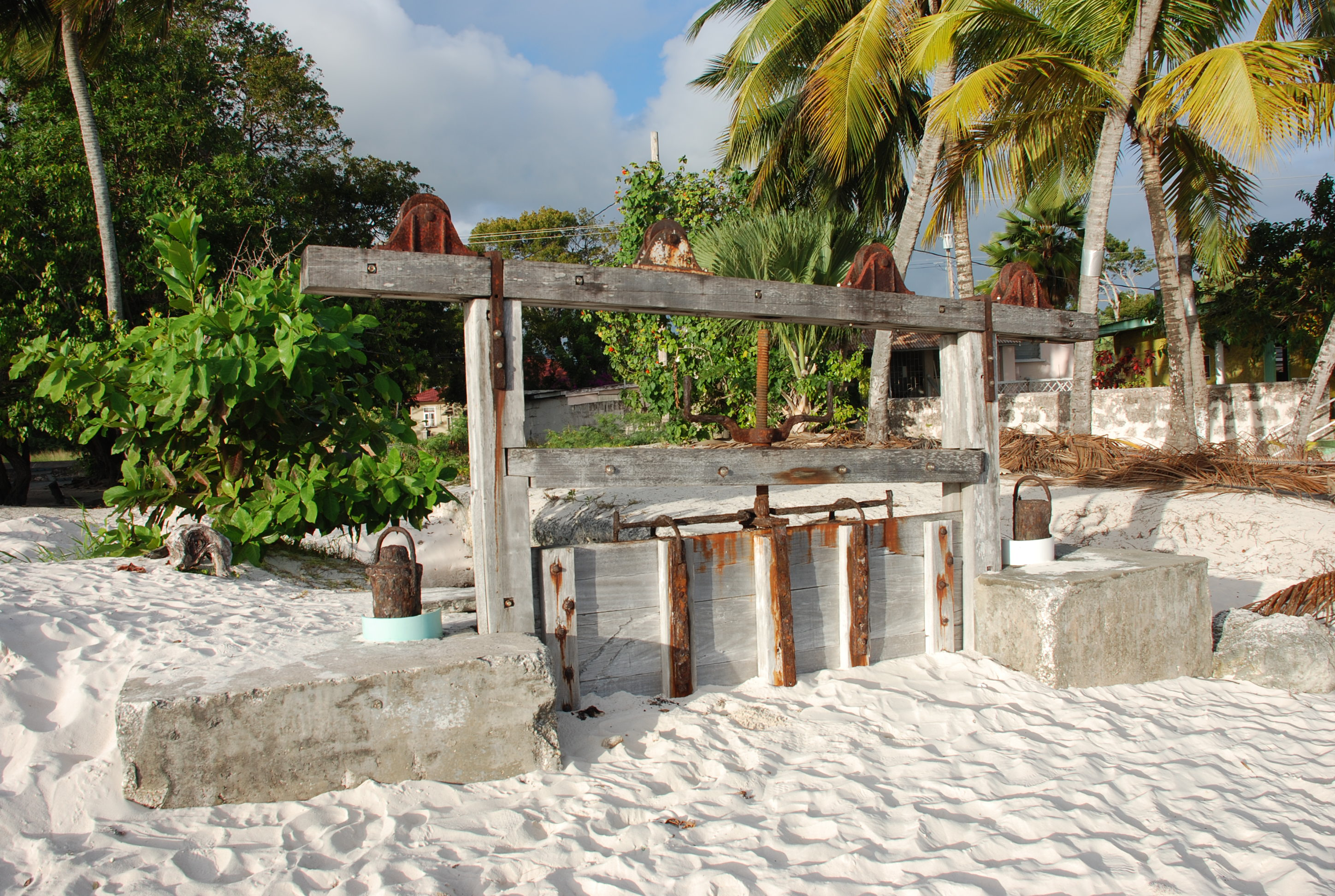
The government sluice - that has been deliberately closed and damned to stop the sea from replenishing the swamp.

Graeme Hall Nature Sanctuary occupies 42 per cent of the Ramsar wetland at Graeme Hall, in Christ Church, Barbados. It is currently managed by the Barbados Wetlands Trust and the Protector of the Trust is Anthony Da Silva. The Trust was formed by Da Silva in late 2024 and the property was purchased in December 2024.

The sanctuary is home to the Graeme Hall Swamp, a mangrove swamp which was a popular tourist attraction until about 2006. However, due to an ongoing dispute between the owner and the Barbados government over uncontrolled pollution, allegedly from bordering government-owned land, it has been closed to the public. Since about 2008 it has increasingly suffered from raids and poaching by locals about which the local police are reportedly doing nothing.

As of 2014 it was the last example of the numerous coastal swamps which once dotted the leeward coast of Barbados from Speightstown on the northern west coast to Chancery Lane Swamp just south of the airport. Over the years all of the swamps have been filled in for commercial development killing all of the wildlife that depended upon them. When St. Lawrence Gap was similarly developed for tourism this destruction included filling in the very last duck shooting swamps that were connected to the Graeme Hall Swamp. This is the last significant mangrove swamp in Barbados, and its international importance as a reserve and as a staging post for thousands of migratory birds was recognised by it being declared a Ramsar wetland.

== Ecology ==
Two species of mangroves occur in the area, red mangrove (Rhizophora mangle) and white mangrove (Laguncularia racemosa), both of which thrive in the brackish water of the swamp. However the mangroves and the wildlife that they support are considered to be at high risk of dying in the very near future due to: the increasing dilution of the brackish water by fresh-water run-off, the deliberate dumping of raw sewage into the swamp by the government's South Coast Sewage Treatment Plant, and the deliberate blocking off of the sea-water sluice at Worthing Beach.

Currently (2014) many species of rush-like sedge also flourish in the waterlogged ground. The lake contains large fish such as Atlantic tarpon trapped in the swamp when the sluice was blocked off, as well as a smaller fish similar to mollies, commonly kept in aquaria. Particularly striking are large numbers of small fiddler crabs (Uca burgersi) which scurry along the pathways.

Thousands of migrating birds rest here each year and formal bird shooting no longer occurs at this site, although it is suspected that illegal shooting may still take place. A great attraction of the swamp is the return of white egrets each evening to nest. And at night numerous bats swarm over the surrounding area feeding upon flying insects.

The sanctuary also includes a collection of captive birds in aviaries, including the very rare Saint Vincent amazon parrots (originally from neighbouring St. Vincent), brilliantly red-coloured scarlet ibis and flamingos.

With regards to the St. Vincent parrots: this small population is at very high risk indeed. This is due to the lethargy of the Barbados government in not working with the St. Vincent government and the owner of the Graham Hall Sanctuary to move the birds to an off-shore island or even back to St. Vincent for captive breeding.

This small population of endangered parrots is unlikely to survive due to:

- recent increased raids and poaching at the sanctuary,
- the deliberate cutting off of the sanctuary's water supply as reported by the Barbados Free Press, and
- there being little or no support from the local police when raids do occur

In April 2010, intruders allegedly killed large numbers of crabs, and caused the deaths of a rare amazon parrot and one of the spoonbill chicks inside one of the aviaries.

== Thwarted plans ==
In the early 2000s visitor facilities were planned to include catering, a souvenir shop, information boards, written guides, and an education room.

However, since at least 2006 the public has been stopped from visiting the inner grounds. Only occasionally are the public admitted into the outer grounds albeit on condition of a purchase from the small cafe that is sometimes open at the entrance.

Then in July 2006, plans by a major developer began circulating around Barbados to construct a theme-park named Caribbean Splash Waterpark in proximity to the Graeme Hall Swamp, but the plan was vetoed by the Barbados government.

However soon afterwards the sanctuary, including the lakeside paths, aviaries, and gardens were closed to the public by the owner. He and the Barbados government have been in dispute ever since. The issues and reasons appear to be many and varied but summarise to:

- the government's deliberate blockage of the sluice gate which would allow sea-water to replenish the brackish waters of the swamp - necessary to allow the mangroves to flourish; instead they are slowly dying
- the deliberate dumping of raw sewage into the wetland instead of the sea by the government's South Coast Sewage Treatment Plant
- the contaminated storm water run-off originating from the surrounding 1,150 acres of government-managed drainage systems
- the increasing rain water run-off contaminated by pollutants from the adjoining commercial and residential properties

In April 2010 a major scientific survey was carried out on the sanctuary grounds, the swamp, and the adverse factors affecting the health of the mangroves and wild-life that they support. The report was scathing about the Barbados government's almost total lack of action in controlling the issues raised. The report included a 10-year plan for recovery, yet in 2014 it was reported by the Barbados Free Press that nothing had been done by the Barbados government to address the issues raised; and the swamp and mangroves continue to die.

As Peter Allard stated in 2010:

- "No private investment in a nature reserve can possibly withstand such external forces. Ultimately, environmental protections for multiple generations must stem from government leadership, whose environmental policies must be based in sound science, not politics."
- "The Study conclusions are clear. Once the mangrove forest dies, freshwater organisms will compete with and dominate any fledgling mangrove system trying to restore itself."
- "If the government of Barbados does nothing to study and correct the situation using sound science, the disappearance of the mangrove forest is all but assured."

Recently the Barbados Free Press reported that even the mains water supply to the grounds, aviaries and cafe had been cut off, the supply pipe apparently having been deliberately sawn apart.

== Future ==
So in 2014 the inner grounds are now firmly gated and closed. The aviaries are even nailed shut. And in the last few years the BFP has reported that locals have been breaking into the grounds and aviaries with the attempted theft of the St. Vincent parrots resulting in one dying, and to poach the crabs and fish in the swamp. When the latter has occurred the local police have been reported as having refused to respond and the thieves allowed to keep their illegal catches.

With what is evidently active opposition from the Barbados government towards its preservation the future of the Graeme Hall Nature Sanctuary and the Ramsar wetland is at very high risk.
