= Sharon Moravian Church =

Church in Saint Thomas, Barbados

Coordinates: 13.151756°N 59.600683°W

Sharon Moravian Church is in the south of the centrally located Saint Thomas parish in Barbados. It was built in 1799 at the behest of missionaries.

The missionaries were from the Moravian Church, which originated in the Czech provinces of Bohemia and Moravia. In 1732, the church launched a global mission, going first to the Caribbean. Arriving in Barbados in 1765, the Moravians sought to bring Christianity and education to the slaves, and were the first Europeans to encourage slaves to join their congregations.

The Sharon church building is unspoilt by modernisation. Its architecture is strongly influenced by that of the parts of Europe from which the Moravian missionaries came.
