= Clifton Hill Moravian Church =

Church in Barbados

Clifton Hill Moravian Church is a Moravian church in central Saint Thomas parish in Barbados. It was built by the Moravians who had previously settled on the island in 1839.

Dame Maizie Barker-Welch, DBE, a Barbadian member of parliament and woman's rights activist, was buried at Clifton Hill Moravian Church.
