= Flower Forest =

Botanical garden in Saint Joseph, Barbados

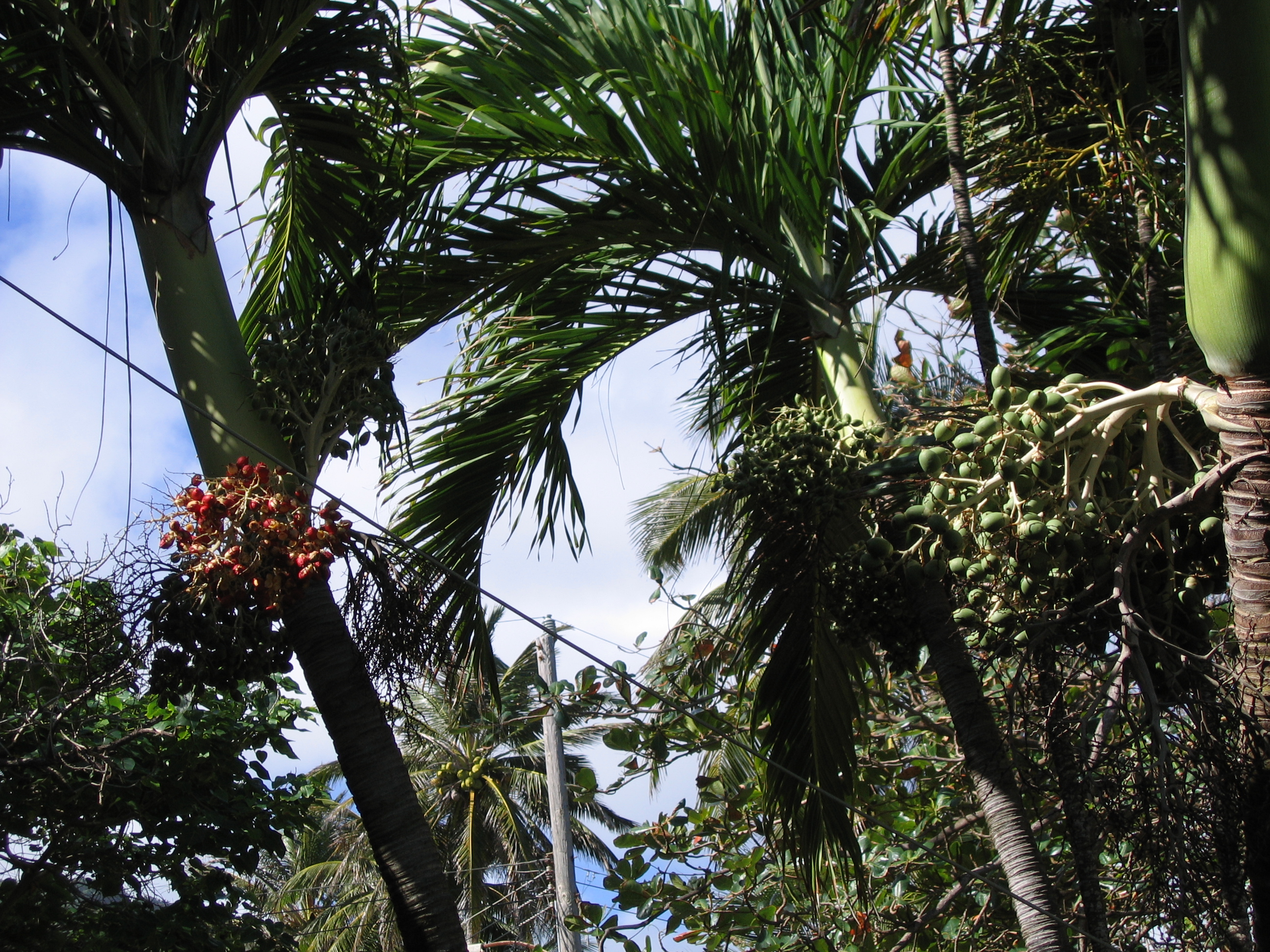
- Tropical palms with fruits.
- Interactive map of Flower Forest
- Coordinates: 13°12′12″N 59°34′1″W
- Area: 50-acre (200,000 m^{2})
- Created: 1983
- Website: www.flowerforestbarbados.com

Flower Forest Botanical Gardens is a horticultural park and tourist attraction near the village of Bloomsbury, Saint Joseph in Barbados. It is a scenic garden park with attractive flowering plants and tropical trees. The 50-acre (200,000 m^{2}) property was formerly a sugar plantation.

== History ==
Richmond Plantation was redeveloped in the 1980s to become a botanical and tourism resource by a diverse group, notably Don Hill (Barbados Telephone Company), Will Huey (RSPCA), Bertie Graham (Paredos), Richard Coghlan (Layout of the Sandy Lane Hotel grounds, Trevena Gardens), Peter Gilkes (Printersco).

The gardens were purchased from the founding shareholders in 2009 and continue to be a sustainable agricultural development mainly in tourism, privately owned by David Spieler. An amicable transfer, the takeover has allowed many improvements to be initiated.

== Botany ==
Collections of Heliconias, ginger lilies, bromeliads, anthurium lilies, and other tropical flowers presently provide a flowering base underneath tall, indigenous Caribbean Royal palms, which grow wild in the Scotland District of Barbados.

== Gardeners ==
In 2019 Flower Forest employs 4 full-time gardeners, 2 pavilion staff members, and is managed by Angela Hurdle. It is the largest garden in Barbados.

== See also ==
- Andromeda Botanic Gardens
- Welchman Hall Gully
- Hunte's Gardens
- Orchid World
