= Harrison's Cave =

Cave and tourist attraction in Barbados

Coordinates: 13.18517°N 59.57453°W

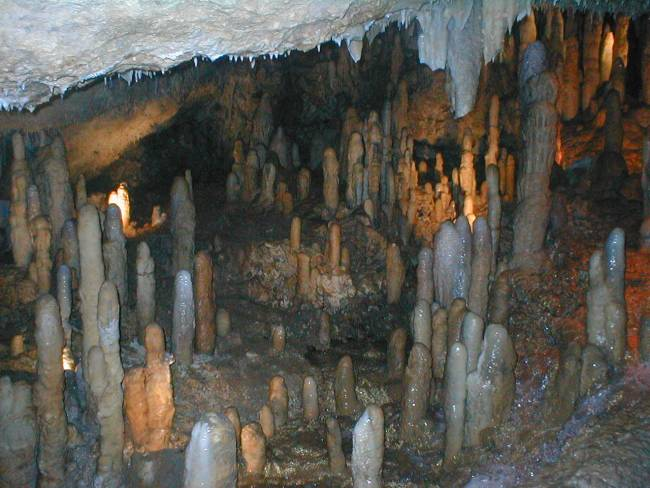
Stalagmite formations in Harrison's cave. Area known as "The Village."

Harrison's Cave is a tourist attraction in the country of Barbados, first mentioned in 1795. Tourists can access the subterranean environment on a tramway.

== History ==
The caves were first mentioned in historical documents in 1795, and were rediscovered in the early 1970s by Jack Peeples.

They were developed by the government as part of a tram tour, and opened to the public in 1981.

In 2000, ownership of the cave was transferred to a government-owned private company, Caves of Barbados Ltd, and in 2020 a 25-year contract was signed with Chukka Caribbean Adventures to operate the cave and surrounding eco-park.

== Description ==
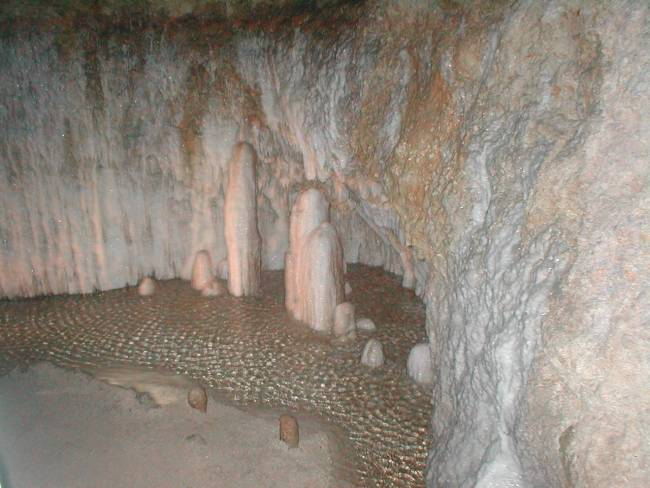
Small group of stalagmites, also known as "The Altar." It is said the left stalagmite is a woman, and the right stalagmite is a man on his knee proposing.

Harrison's Cave is in the central uplands of Barbados. It is situated at 700 feet (210 m) above sea level. The three characteristics of the central uplands are gullies, sinkholes and caverns. It is also an entrance for another place of interest: Welchman Hall Gully which is closed.

The caves are naturally formed by water erosion through the limestone rock. The calcium-rich water that runs through the caves have formed the unusual stalactites and stalagmites formations.

Travel through the caves is by tram, at certain points during the tour visitors are allowed to alight from the tram and get close up to the formations. One main area of the caves is a huge cavern, termed "The Great Hall", measuring over 50 feet (15 m) in height. After the great Hall the tram stops at "The Village". At The Village, some of the formations have joined to form columns after thousands of years. Other areas the tram stops along the tour is "The Chapel," "The Rotunda," and "The Altar." Visitors travel through the Boyce Tunnel via tram to all depths of the cave.
