= Andromeda Botanic Gardens =

Botanical garden in Saint Joseph, Barbados

Coordinates: 13°13′N 59°31′W

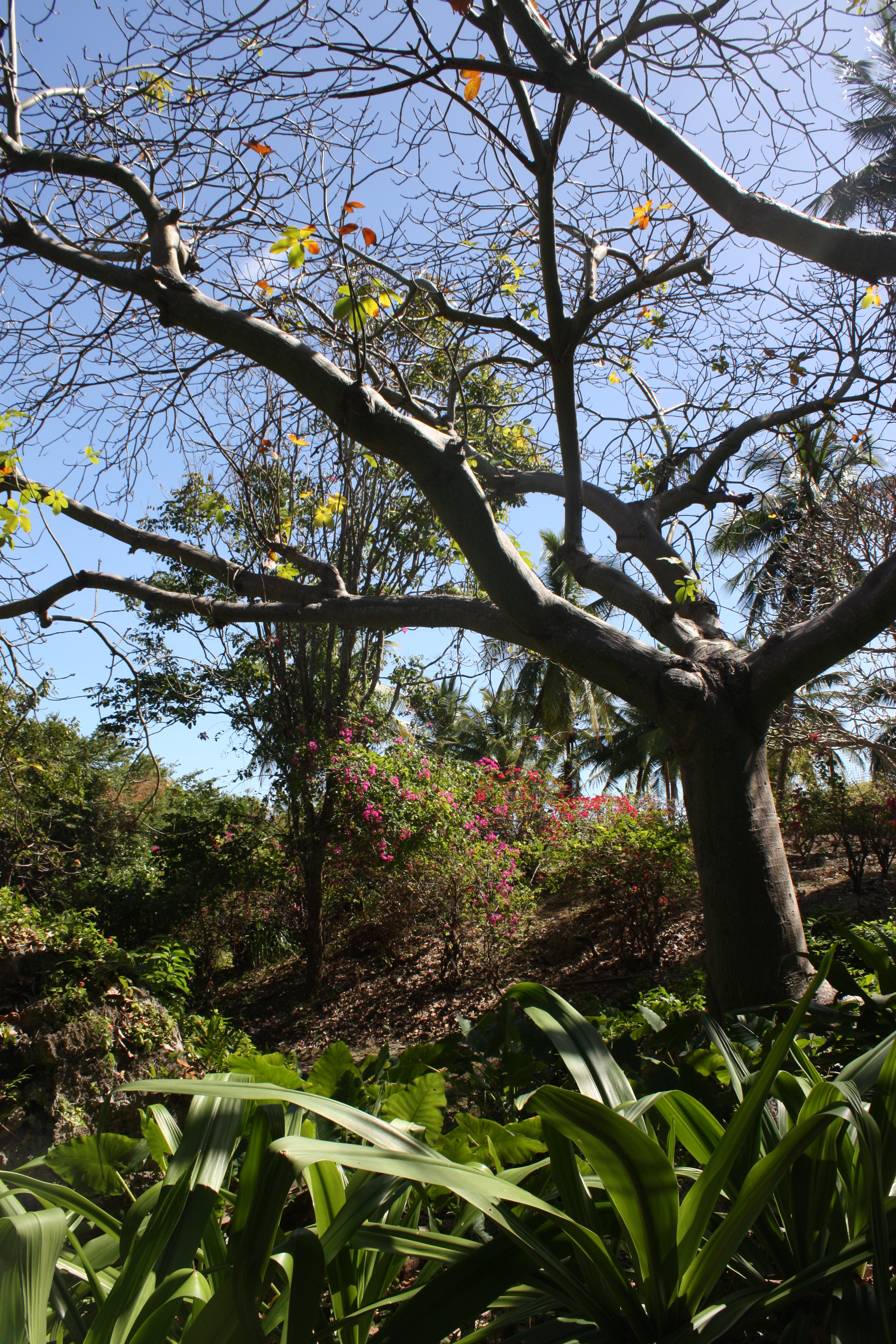

Andromeda Botanic Gardens is an organic 8-acre (3.2 ha) botanical garden and a historic cultural attraction in the village of Bathsheba, Saint Joseph in Barbados. It is an authentic garden created by multiple award-winning horticulturalist Iris Bannochie, a female, Barbadian, self-taught scientist. It is unique, having been created from the 1950s as both a private botanical garden and a pleasure garden by an individual. Named from the Greek mythological figure of Andromeda it started as a private plant collection around Ms Bannochie's home, who was also the leading expert on horticulture on the island. Ms Bannochie wrote various academic papers from topics including the lifecycle of the whistling frog, and the vitamin C content of the Barbadian cherry. She was a mentor to many and considered the queen of Barbadian horticulture. At one point, she was responsible for introducing over 90% of the ornamental plants found in Barbados. Iris Bannochie created the garden from 1954 on land owned by her family since 1740. During the 1950s Barbados was a plantation economy with no history of garden creation. Iris Bannochie travelled the world and collected plants for Andromeda. She showed plants from Andromeda both independently and with the Barbados Horticultural Society many times at the RHS Chelsea Flower Show in London, winning numerous medals. In 1982, Ms Bannochie's display was titled Andromeda Gardens at the Show and her exhibition of palms was the largest selection of that plant family ever seen at the Chelsea Flower Show. She was also the recipient of the RHS Veitch Medal and a fellow of the Linnean Society. In 1990, the garden had 40,000 visitors.

Andromeda Botanic Gardens is a Partner Garden of the UK Royal Horticultural Society, the only garden with such a status in the West Indies. In October 2019, the garden received the Botanical Treasure Award from the Biological Education and Research Programme, in recognition of it biological diversity. It has appeared on UK television and was the subject of the first online lecture in September 2020, facilitated by Kew Mutual Improvement Society at the Royal Botanic Gardens, Kew.

Andromeda Botanic Gardens was first open to the public during a fund raising event hosted by the Barbados Horticultural Society in the 1970s. Andromeda has remained open to the public by paid admission since then (admission is free for residents of Barbados). Andromeda has over six hundred different species of plants adapted to a range of tropical environments. In 2026, the Palm Garden contained over 40 different species of palm and there were approximately 120 different tree species. Over 90 plant families are represented at Andromeda Botanic Gardens, making this garden one of the most plant diverse gardens in the tropical world.

Andromeda Botanic Gardens is owned by the Barbados National Trust, having been bequeathed to the Trust when Ms. Bannochie died in 1988. It is currently leased to Passiflora Ltd. The company is responsible for the garden's management and development and is a registered training provider and assessment centre, offering a range of horticultural courses. Interns, particularly from France, spend two months working alongside the gardening team. The new Ethnobotanical Garden is the centrepiece of Andromeda's mandate to conserve local flora. Created in June 2022 on 2 acres of land at Andromeda, it was funded by Sandals Foundation. The new garden is a community space and a celebration of local plants; how people in Barbados use plants (contemporary and historical) and local wildlife. The Ethnobotanical Project is run in co-ordination with Dr Sonia Peter's Biocultural Education Research Programme, which has responsibility for research activities at Andromeda Botanic Gardens.

At the centre of the upper garden is a native banyan. When Queen Ingrid of Denmark visited the garden in 1971, she was served refreshments in a recently built gazebo overlooking the sea. There is a classroom, cafeteria and gift shop, showcasing local art and crafts.

In addition to being a botanical garden, Andromeda Botanic Gardens, from 1954 to 1985/87 Dr. Bayley's workshop at Andromeda was used by the US Navy as the location of a secret cold-war Soviet submarine tracking station that used leading edge SOSUS technology. In 1954 the U.S. Government installed research equipment worth US$500,000 (1950s prices). Andromeda was a suitable setting for this covert operation. It was in the right location overlooking the Atlantic Ocean, within easy reach of the Atlantic shelf. Andromeda was also off-the beaten-track. There was a credible cover story. And, Dr. Bayley was a friend of the US and could be trusted. It was an open secret with the fishermen of Bathsheba and Tent Bay who helped land the SOSUS cable that Soviet submarines were being tracked from Dr. Bayley’s workshop at Andromeda.

== See also ==
- Flower Forest, another garden in Barbados
- San Juan Botanical Garden
- Saint Vincent and the Grenadines Botanic Gardens
