= List of cities, towns and villages in Barbados =

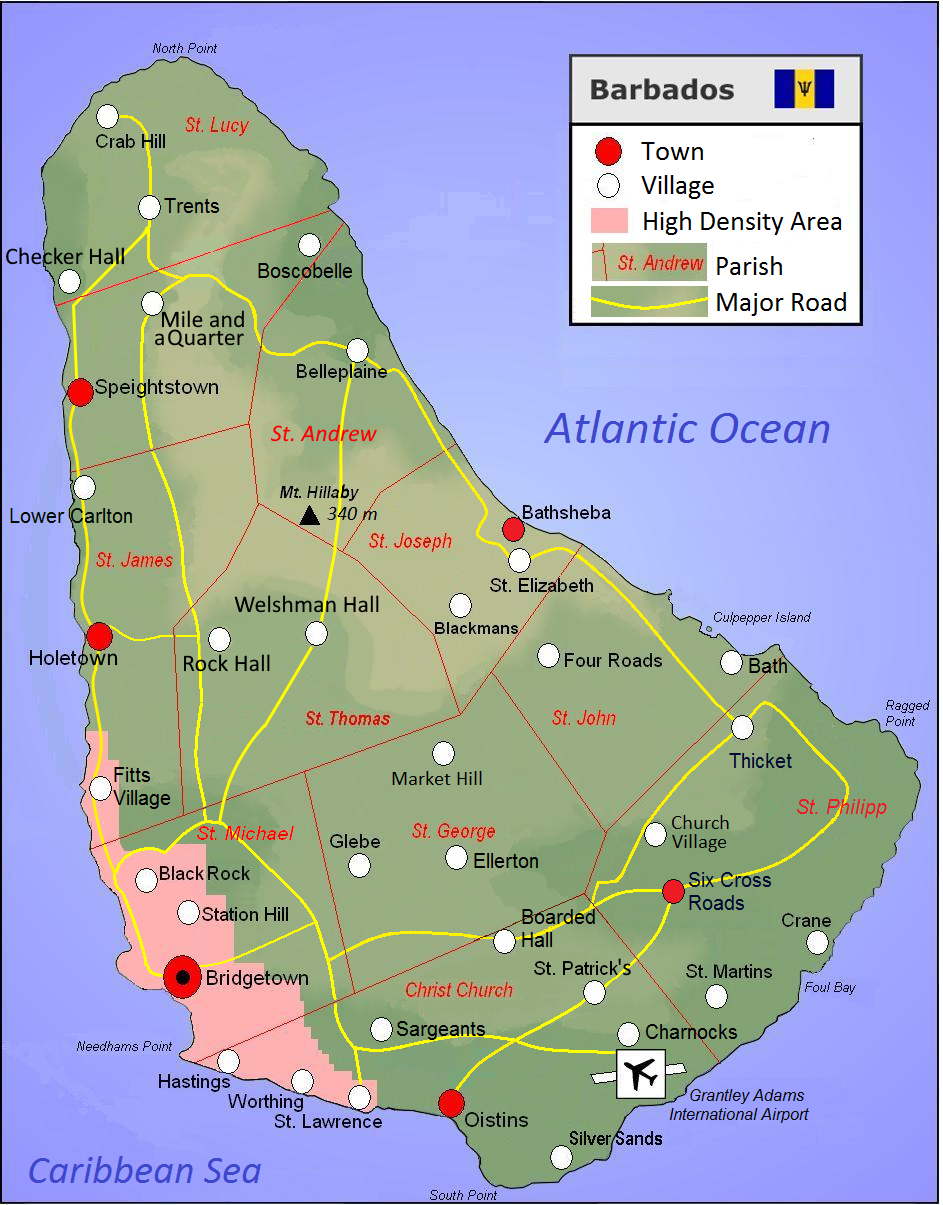
Map of Barbados

This is a list of cities, towns and villages in Barbados. Barbados is a sovereign island country in the Lesser Antilles, in the Americas. It is 34 kilometres (21 miles) in length and up to 23 km (14 mi) in width, covering an area of 432 km^{2} (167 sq mi). It is situated in the western area of the North Atlantic and 100 km (62 mi) east of the Windward Islands and the Caribbean Sea; Many of the village names in Barbados are based upon the names of plantations. Barbados is divided into 11 parishes.

== Christ Church ==
- Atlantic Shores
- Bannatyne
- Blue Waters
- Boarded Hall
- Briggs
- Callenders
- Cane Vale
- Chancery Lane
- Charnocks
- Clapham
- Edey
- Hastings
- Hopewell
- Maxwell
- Maxwell Hill
- Newton Terrace
- Oistins
- Rockley
- Scarborough
- Seawell
- Saint Lawrence
- Welches
- Woman's Bay
- Worthing
- Wotton
- Yorkshire

== Saint Andrew ==
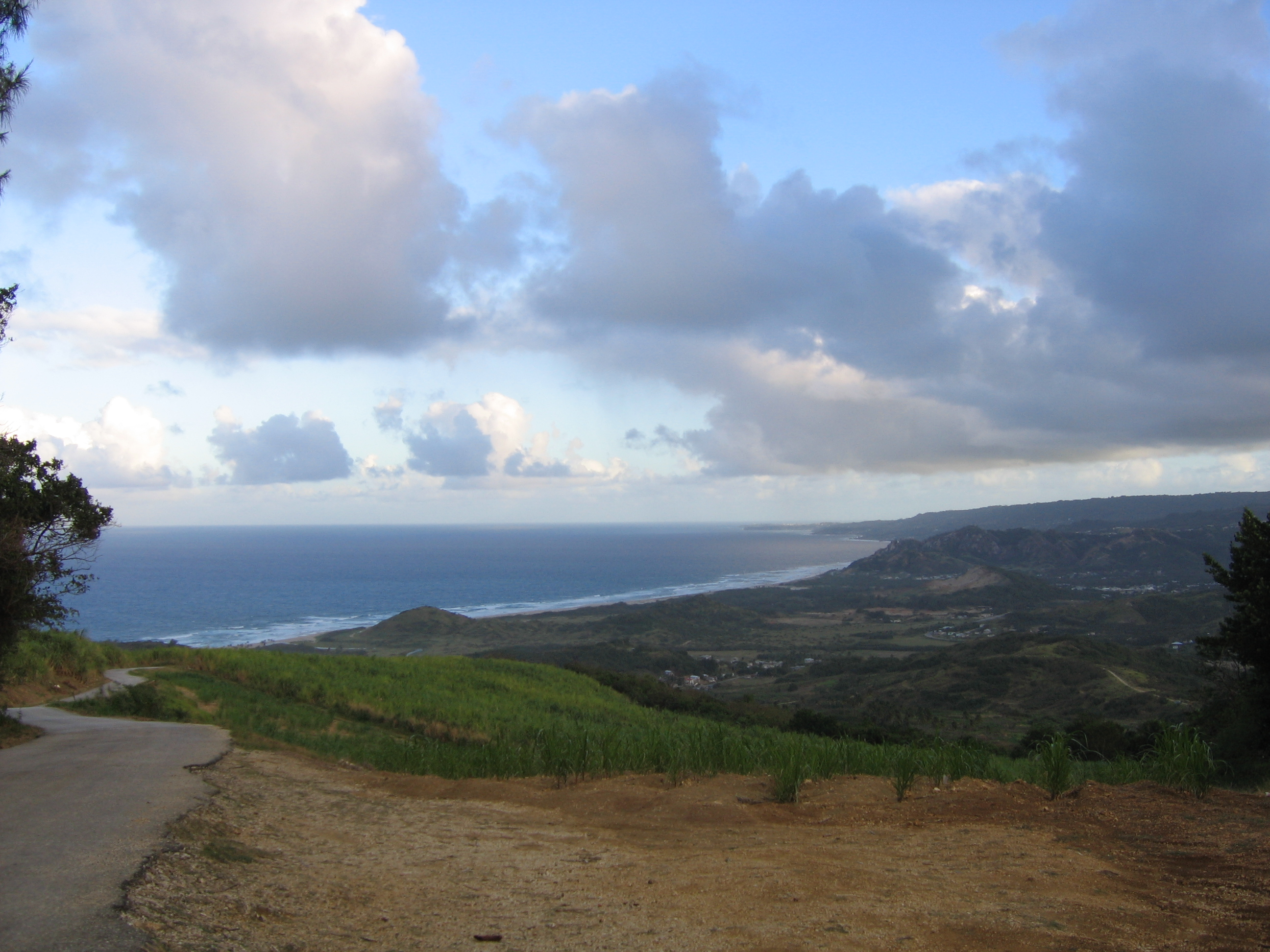
A view looking southeast from Cherry Tree Hill

- Barclays Park
- Baxters
- Belleplaine
- Breedy's
- Bruce Vale
- Chalky Mount
- Cherry Tree Hill
- Greenland
- Hillaby
- Turner's Hall Woods – park and nature reserve
- White Hill

== Saint George ==
- Bairds
- Belair
- Brighton
- Bulkeley
- Bulkely Factory
- Campaign Castle
- Church View
- Constant
- Drax Hall – sugar was first cultivated in Barbados in the 1640s at Drak Hall
- Ellerton
- Gun Hill
- Newbury

== Saint James ==
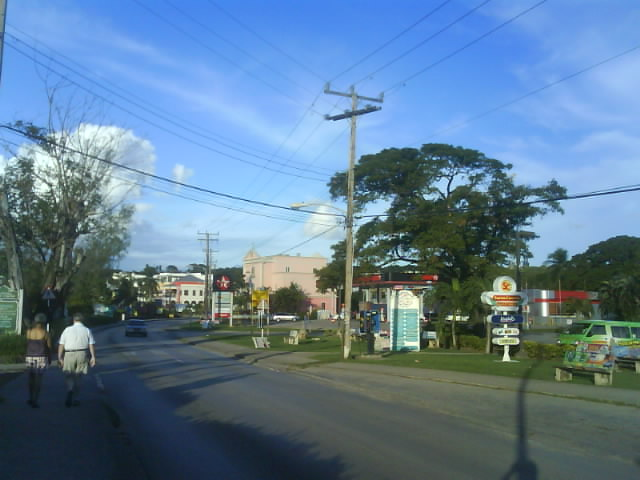
Highway 1 in Holetown (facing north), close to the public buildings

- Apes Hill
- Appleby
- Carlton
- Holetown
- Lower Carlton
- Mount Standfast
- Oxnards Crescent
- Thorpe
- Upper Carlton
- West Terrace

== Saint John ==
- Bath
- Bowmanston
- Cherry Grove
- Coach Hill
- Gall Hill
- Glebe Land
- Hohtersal
- Kendal
- Mount Tabor
- Saint Marks
- Saint Margaret's
- Sherbourne
- Venture
- Messiah Street

== Saint Joseph ==
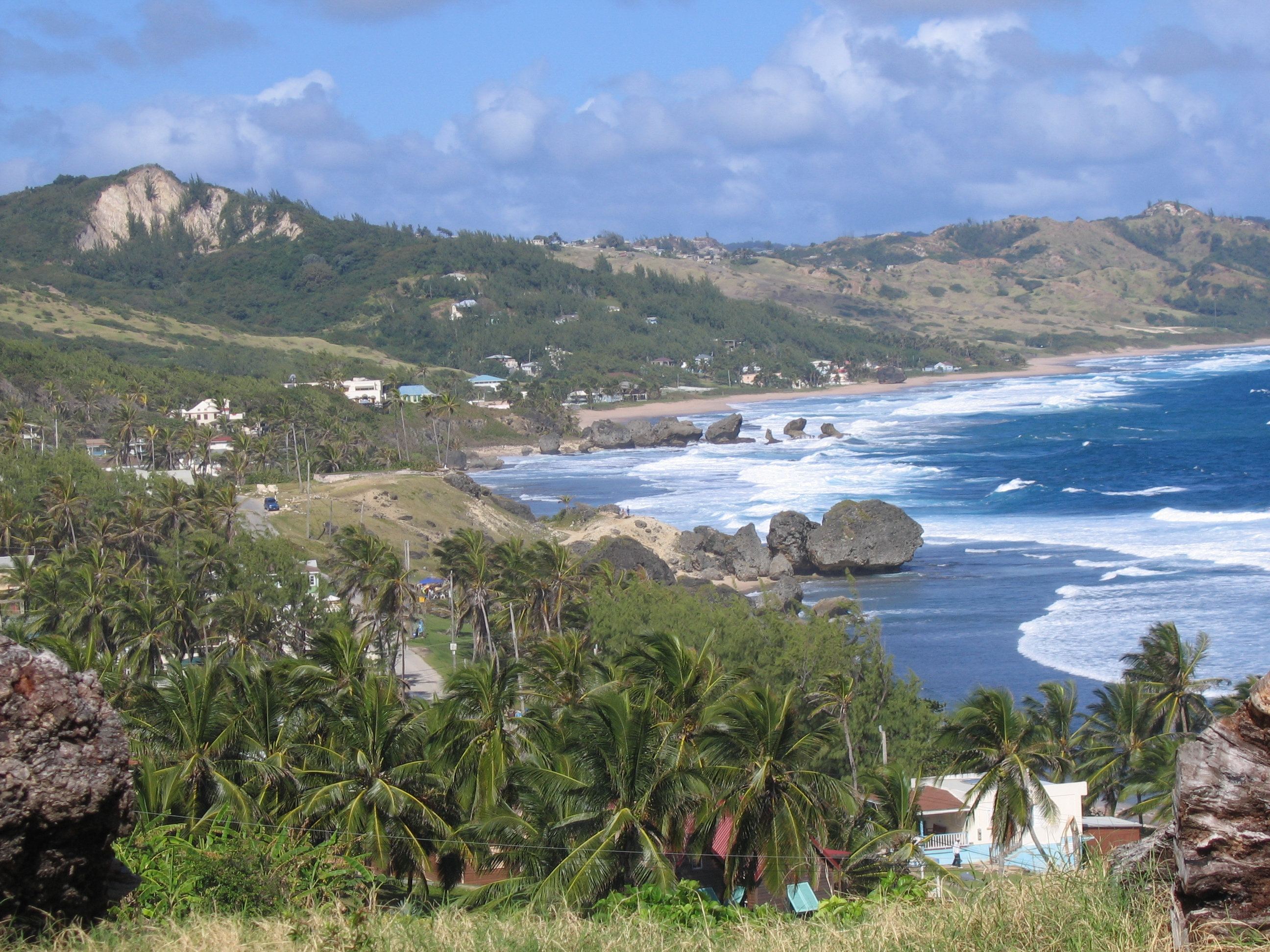
A view of the coast in Bathsheba

- Airy Hill
- Bathsheba
- Bissex
- Blackmans
- Bonwell
- Branchbury
- Buckden House
- Cambridge
- Canefield
- Castle Grant
- Cattlewash
- Chimborazo
- Hackleton's Cliff
- Horse Hill
- Sugar Hill

== Saint Lucy ==
- Alexandra
- Allmans
- Archers
- Babbs
- Bishops
- Blacksage Alley
- Benthams
- Bourbon
- Bromefield
- Cave Hill
- Chance Hall
- Checker Hall
- Church Hill
- Content
- Cove Bay
- Crab Hill
- Friendship
- Grave Yard
- Hannays
- Harrisons
- Hope
- Husbands
- Lamberts
- Little Bay
- Nesfield
- Pie Corner
- Retreat
- River Bay
- Spring Hall

== Saint Michael ==
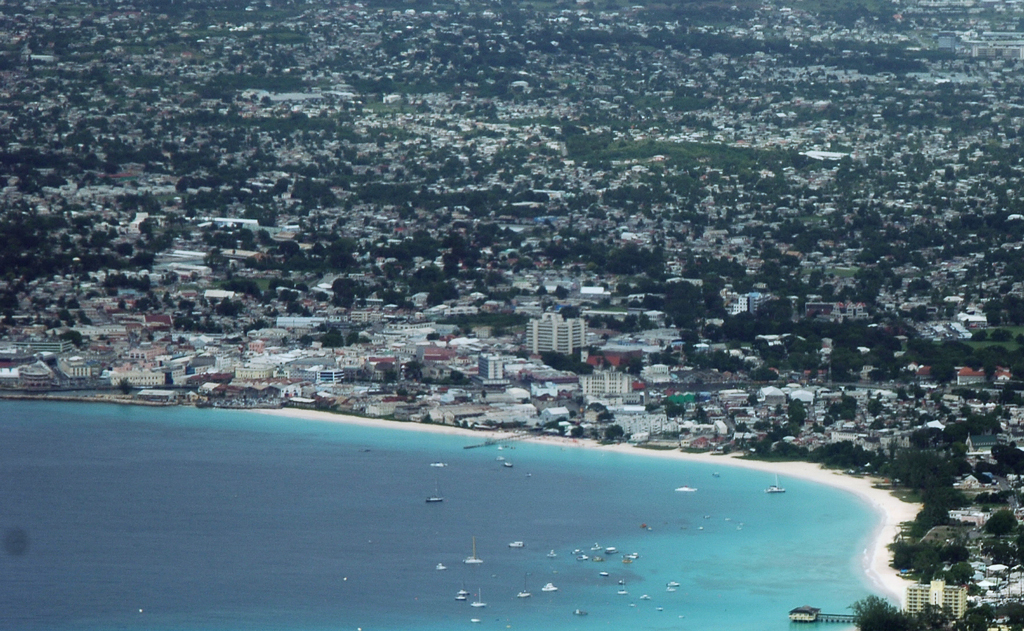
Bridgetown, Capital of Barbados

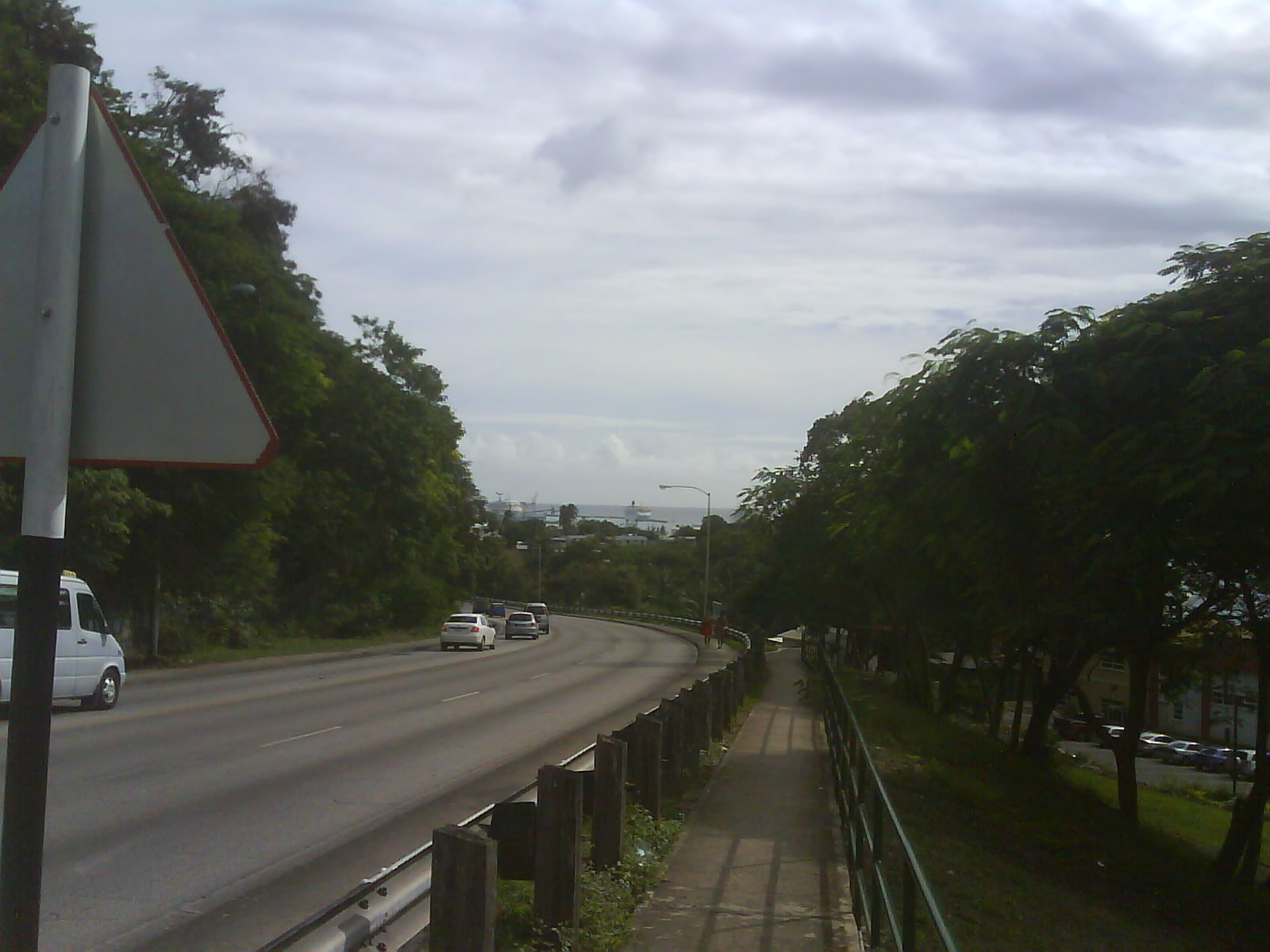
University Drive at Cave Hill, westbound with the port in the distance

- Bank Hall
- Gay
- Belfield
- Belle
- Bibbys Lane
- Black Rock
- Bridgetown (110,000) – the capital of Barbados
- Brighton
- Brittons Hill
- Bush Hall
- Canewood
- Carrington
- Cave Hill
- Clermont
- Codrington
- Dayrells
- Deacons
- Deacons Farm
- Eagle Hall
- Eden Lodge
- Fairfield
- Fontabelle
- Friendship
- Friendship Terrace
- Goodland
- Grazettes
- Green Hill
- Haggatt Hall
- Harmony Hall
- Henrys
- Highgate
- Hothersal Turning
- Howells
- Ivy
- Jackmans
- Kew
- Lazarette
- Lodge Hill
- Lower Estate
- Mapp Hill
- Neils
- Pine Hill
- Prospect
- Rock Dundo
- Rouen
- Spring Garden
- Station Hill
- St Barnabas
- Two Mile Hill
- Upton
- Wanstead
- Warrens
- Waterford
- Weymouth
- Whitehall
- Wildey

== Saint Peter ==
- Alleynedale
- Ashburton Grove
- Ashton Hall
- Bakers
- Battleys
- Black Bess
- Boscobelle
- Castle
- Diamond Corner
- Date Tree Hill
- Farley Hill
- Fourhill
- French Village
- Gays
- Gibbes
- Haymans
- Indian Ground
- Mile and a Quarter
- Mangrove Terrace
- Mullins Terrace
- Portland
- Retreat
- Road View
- Rock Hall
- Rose Hill
- Six Mens
- Speightstown (3,600) – the second-largest town centre of Barbados
- Sunbury
- The Baltic
- The Risk
- The Rock
- The Whim
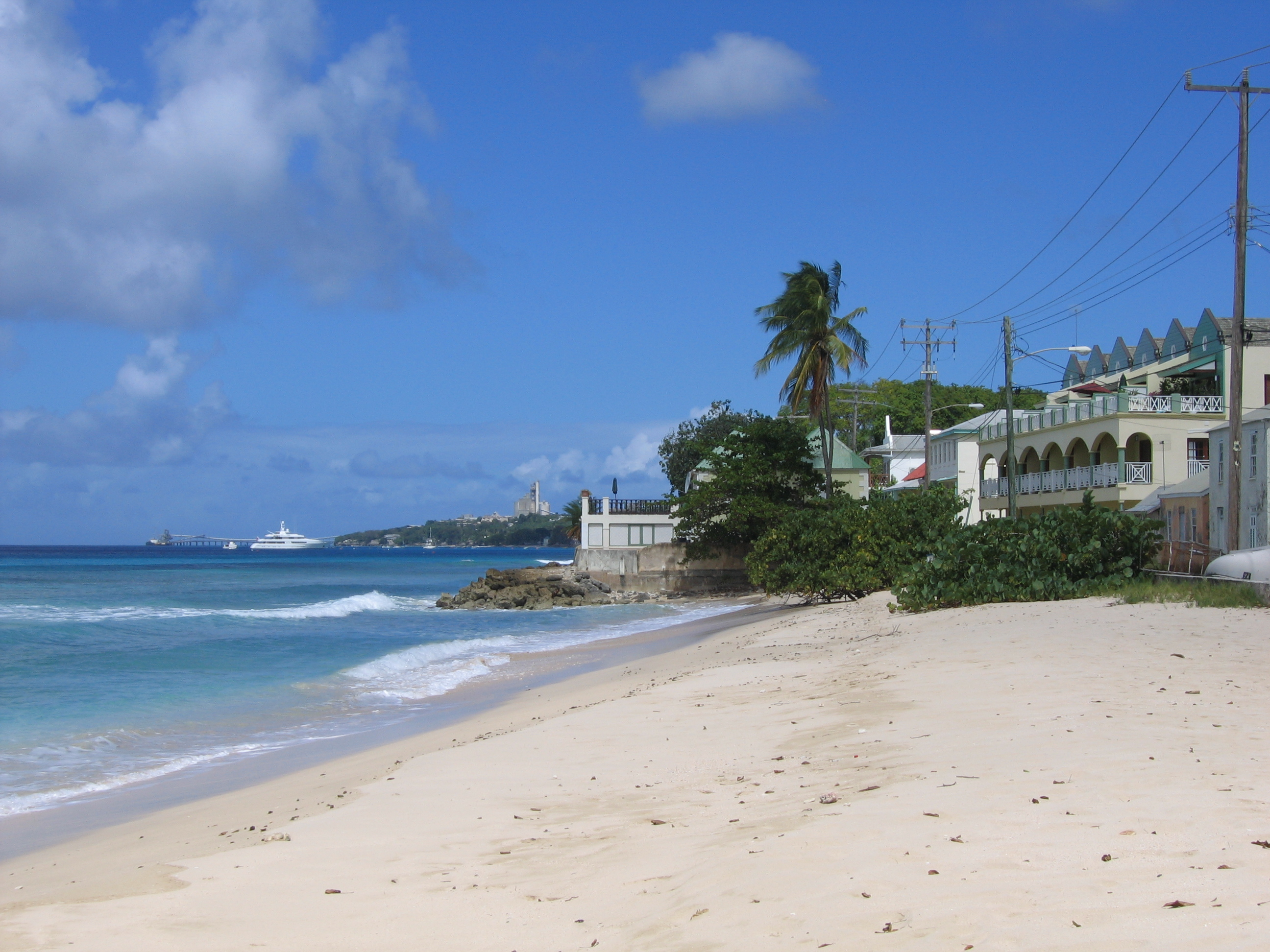
Speightstown

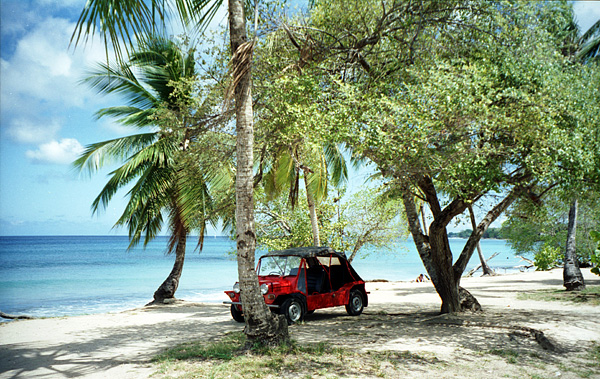
A Mini Moke on the beach at Speightstown, Barbados

== Saint Philip ==
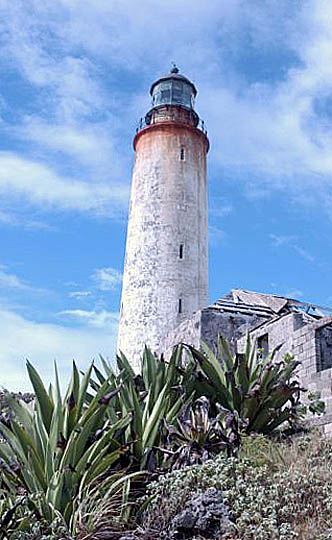
The lighthouse at Ragged Point

- Bayfield
- Bayleys
- Belair
- Bentleys
- Blades
- Blades Hill
- Brereton
- Bushy Park
- Carrington
- Caveland
- Church Village
- Coles Pasture
- Foul Bay
- Four Roads
- Industry Hill
- Jezreel
- Kirtons
- Mangrove
- Marchfield
- Marley Vale
- Merricks
- Ragged Point
- Saint Martins
- Sealy Hill
- Six Cross Roads
- Sunbury
- The Crane
- Three Houses
- Woodbourne
- Workhall
- Rices
- River Phinneys
- Rock Hall
- Gemswick
- Harlington
- Heddings
- Foul Bay

== Saint Thomas ==
- Allen View
- Applewhaites
- Arch Hall
- Arthurs Seat
- Bagatelle
- Bennetts
- Bloomsbury
- Blowers
- Bridgefield
- Cane Garden
- Carrington
- Chapman
- Christie
- Edge Hill Heights #1
- Hopewell
- Welchman Hall

== Unsorted ==
- Congaline

== Top 5 sorted by population ==
1. Bridgetown (Saint Michael) 98.511 inhabitants
2. White Hill (Saint Andrew) 5.139 inhabitants
3. Speigthstown (Sain Peter) 3.634 inhabitants
4. Oistins (Chris Church) 2.285 inhabitants
5. Bathseba (Saint Joseph) 1.765 inhabitants

== See also ==
- Parishes of Barbados
- List of schools in Barbados
- List of cities by country
- List of towns
