= ISO 3166-2:BB =

Entry for Barbados in ISO 3166-2

ISO 3166-2:BB is the entry for Barbados in ISO 3166-2, part of the ISO 3166 standard published by the International Organization for Standardization (ISO), which defines codes for the names of the principal subdivisions (e.g., provinces or states) of all countries coded in ISO 3166-1.

Currently for Barbados, ISO 3166-2 codes are defined for 11 parishes.

Each code consists of two parts, separated by a hyphen. The first part is BB, the ISO 3166-1 alpha-2 code of Barbados. The second part is two digits (01–11).

== Current codes ==
Subdivision names are listed as in the ISO 3166-2 standard published by the ISO 3166 Maintenance Agency (ISO 3166/MA).

Click on the button in the header to sort each column.

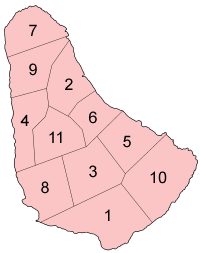
Map of Barbados with each parish labelled with the second part of its ISO 3166-2 code (with leading digit 0 omitted).

Code	Subdivision name (en)
BB-01	Christ Church
BB-02	Saint Andrew
BB-03	Saint George
BB-04	Saint James
BB-05	Saint John
BB-06	Saint Joseph
BB-07	Saint Lucy
BB-08	Saint Michael
BB-09	Saint Peter
BB-10	Saint Philip
BB-11	Saint Thomas

== Changes ==
The following changes to the entry have been announced in newsletters by the ISO 3166/MA since the first publication of ISO 3166-2 in 1998:

Newsletter	Date issued	Description of change in newsletter	Code/Subdivision change
Newsletter I-8	2007-04-17	Addition of the administrative subdivisions and of their code elements	Subdivisions added: 11 parishes

== See also ==
- Subdivisions of Barbados
- FIPS region codes of Barbados
- Vehicle registration plates of Barbados
