= List of regions of Barbados by Human Development Index =

This is a list of regions of Barbados by Human Development Index as of 2022.

Rank	Region (Parish)	HDI (2022)
Very high human development
1	Saint James, Saint George and Saint Thomas	0.822
2	Christ Church and Saint Philip	0.815
–	Barbados (average)	0.809
3	Saint Michael	0.801
3	Saint Lucy, Saint Peter, Saint Andrew, Saint Joseph and Saint John	0.801
