= Bissex =

Coordinates: 13°13′N 59°33′W

For people with the surname, see Bissex (surname).

Bissex is a populated place in the parish of Saint Joseph, Barbados.

== See also ==
- List of cities, towns and villages in Barbados
- Wikipedia:Unusual place names
