= Oxnards Crescent =

Oxnards Crescent is a populated place in the parish of Saint James, Barbados.

== See also ==
- List of cities, towns and villages in Barbados
