= Lamberts, Barbados =

Lamberts
- Village
- Location in Barbados
- Coordinates: 13°17′48″N 59°35′50″W
- Country: Barbados
- Parish: Saint Lucy
- Elevation: 364 ft (111 m)
- Time zone: UTC-04:00 (AST)

Lamberts is a tiny village in the parish of Saint Lucy, Barbados close to the border with Saint Peter. The location is best known for the experimental wind tower that was supposed to become part of a larger windfarm built in the 1980s.

== Windfarm ==
At the windfarm area the Government and Barbados Light and Power Company has tried to replace the current experimental turbine, and continue installing the full windfarm. However, both parties have met localized opposition based on noise complaints by residents about the current abandoned turbine which has technology over 20 years old.

In June 2009, it was reported in local media that the turbine was in a broken state with large sections of it lying on the ground.
