= Atlantic Shores, Barbados =

Coordinates: 13°02′N 59°31′W

Atlantic Shores is a populated place in the parish of Christ Church, Barbados. It is a coastal area with beaches located on the south coast of Barbados.

== Community ==
Atlantic Shores has a neighborhood watch program. A neighborhood recycling program was launched in January 2016 by the neighborhood watch program.

== Business ==
There are rental apartments in Atlantic Shores.

== South Point Light ==
The South Point Light is a lighthouse in Atlantic Shores that is the oldest lighthouse out of the four that exist in the island country. South Point Light is located in the "southernmost point of land in Barbados." The lighthouse is 89 feet in height, and was assembled in 1852 after previously being displayed at London's Great Exhibition in 1851. South Point Light was originally constructed in England using cast iron, and was shipped to Atlantic Shores in 1851. (Note: South Point Lighthouse, at the island's southernmost point in Christ Church, is a cast iron structure made in England and shipped to Barbados in 1851.")

== See also ==
- List of cities, towns and villages in Barbados
