= Blue Waters, Barbados =

Populated place in Christ Church, Barbados

Coordinates: 13°04′N 59°35′W

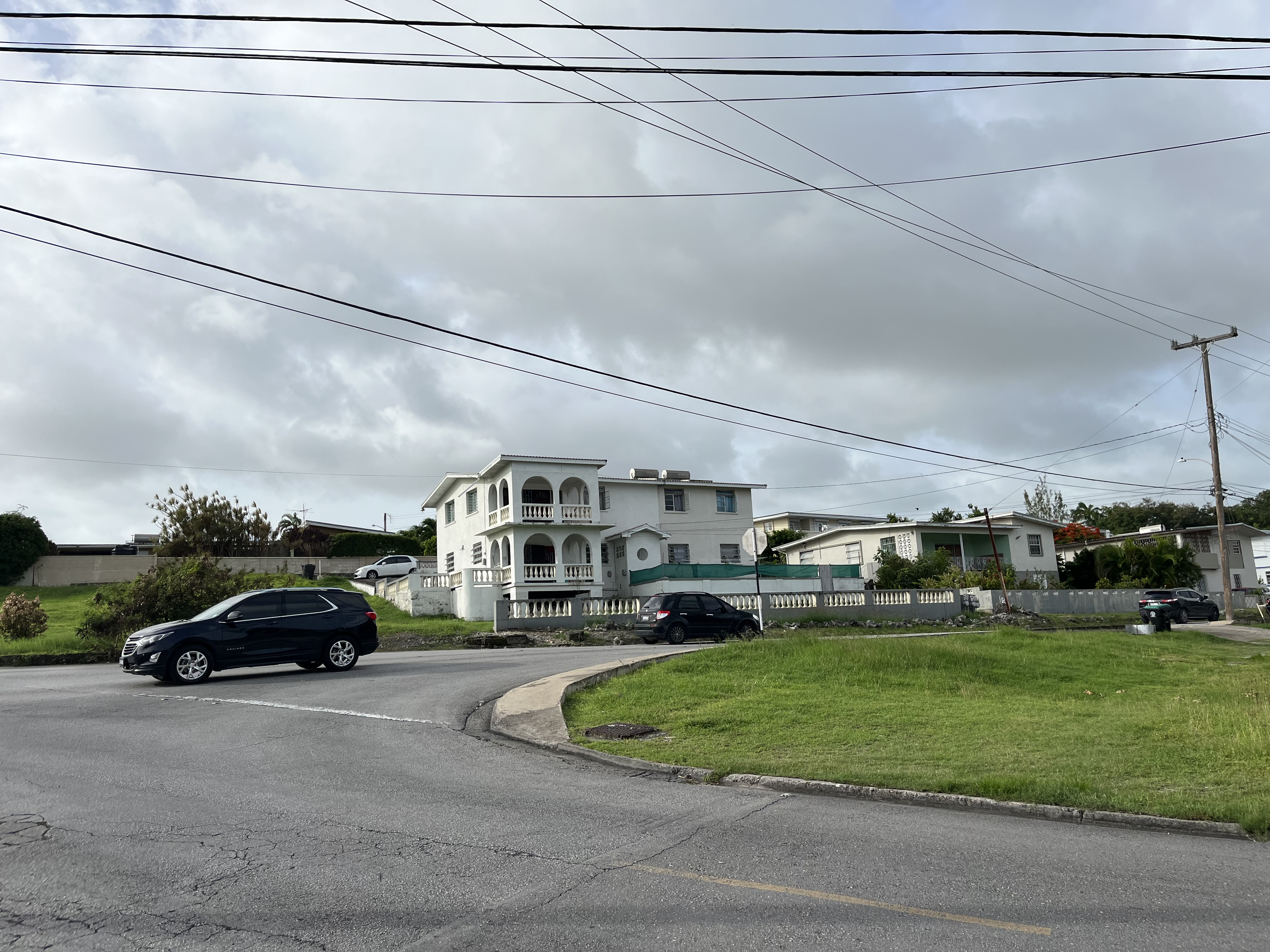
Blue Waters, Barbados

Blue Waters is a populated place in the parish of Christ Church, Barbados. It is a coastal area located on the south coast of Barbados. Rockley Beach is a beach located in Blue Waters.

== Business ==
Some guesthouses and inns exist in Blue Waters, such as the Rockley Beach Hotel and Blue Waters Beach Hotel.

== See also ==
- List of cities, towns and villages in Barbados
