= Bannatyne, Barbados =

Populated place in Barbados

Coordinates: 13°05′N 59°32′W

Bannatyne is a populated place in the parish of Christ Church, Barbados.

== See also ==
- List of cities, towns and villages in Barbados
