= Rock Hall, Barbados =

Coordinates: 13.1901°N 59.6067°W

Rock Hall is a populated place in the parish of Saint Peter, Barbados.

== See also ==
- List of cities, towns and villages in Barbados
