= Boscobelle =

Coordinates: 13°17′N 59°34′W

Boscobelle is a populated place in the parish of Saint Peter, Barbados.

== See also ==
- List of cities, towns and villages in Barbados
