= Bath, Barbados =

Coordinates: 13°11′N 59°28′W

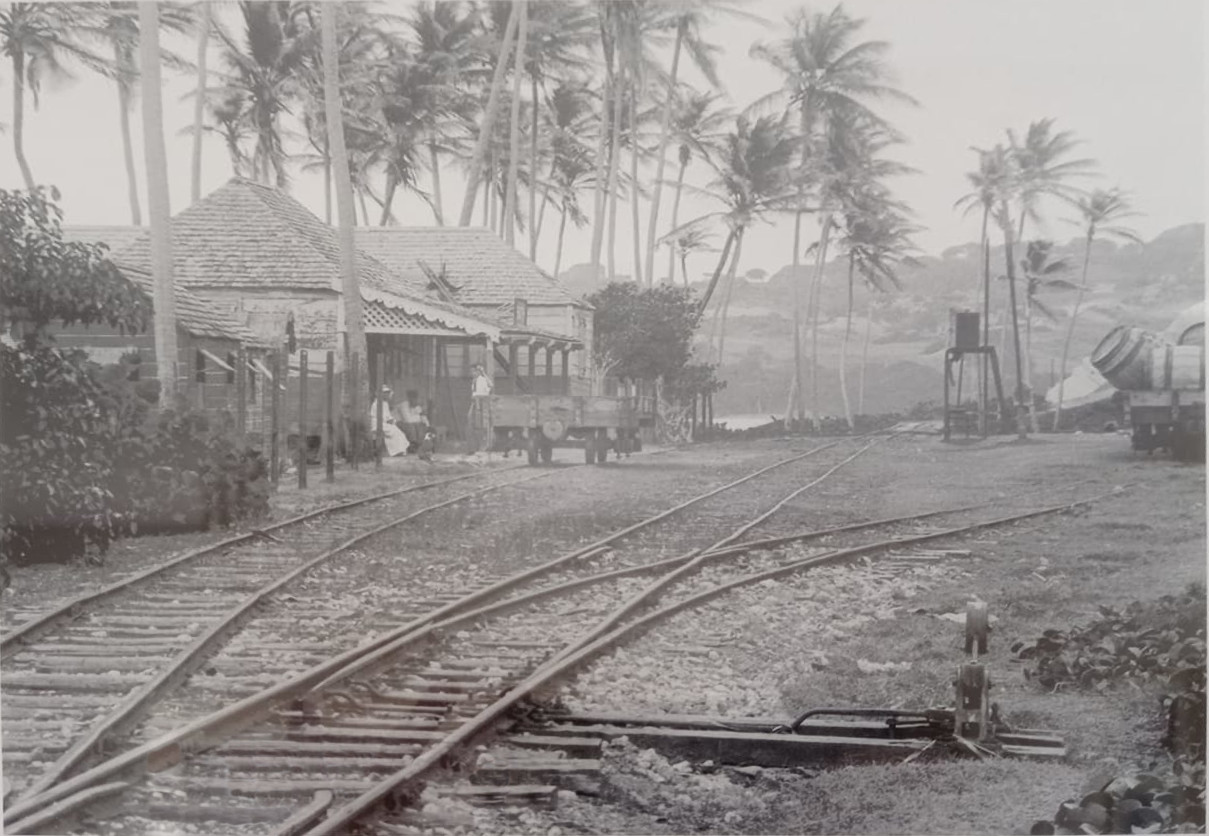
Bath Train Station, ca 1910

Bath is a populated place in the parish of Saint John, Barbados.

== See also ==
- List of cities, towns and villages in Barbados
