= Diamond Corner =

Coordinates: 13°16′N 59°36′W

Diamond Corner is a populated place in the parish of Saint Peter, Barbados.

== See also ==
- List of cities, towns and villages in Barbados
