= Grave Yard, Barbados =

Grave Yard is a populated place in the parish of Saint Lucy, Barbados.

== See also ==
- List of cities, towns and villages in Barbados
