= Fourhill =

Place in Saint Peter, Barbados

Coordinates: 13.2461°N 59.6103°W

Fourhill is a populated place in the parish of Saint Peter, Barbados.

== See also ==
- List of cities, towns and villages in Barbados
