= Chimborazo, Barbados =

Place in Saint Joseph, Barbados

Coordinates: 13°12′N 59°33′W

Chimborazo is a populated place in the parish of Saint Joseph, Barbados. Chimborazo Hill in Chimborazo is one of the highest points in Barbados.

== See also ==
- List of cities, towns and villages in Barbados
