= Mile and a Quarter =

Coordinates: 13°15′N 59°37′W

Mile and a Quarter is a populated place in the parish of Saint Peter, Barbados.

== See also ==
- List of cities, towns and villages in Barbados
