= All Saints' Church, Barbados =

Church in Barbados

Coordinates: 13.270°N 59.613°W

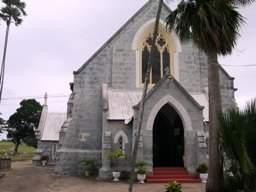
All Saints' Church

All Saints' Anglican Church is a historic Church located at Pleasant Hall, Saint Peter, Barbados. The original church dates back to 1649 when a chapel of ease was established to prevent the then colonial settlers from having to venture to the St. James Parish Church and the St. Peter's Parish Church. This original church was destroyed by the Great Hurricane of 1831. A second church waw built in 1839, but was pulled down as unsafe forty years later after structural faults were discovered. The church is known for having detailed stained glass, the main show piece being the eastern detail, a donation from Thomas Briggs in memory of his parents Sir and Lady Graham Briggs, owners of the Grenade Hall Plantation which at the time included the Farley Hill Great House. Buried within the 16th Century church yard is the first English settler to set foot on Barbadian soil, William Arnold. The present church was built and consecrated in 1884. The present Rector is Father Selven Lowe.
