= Cambridge, Barbados =

Coordinates: 13.2289°N 59.5446°W

Cambridge is a populated place in the parish of Saint Joseph, Barbados.

== See also ==
- List of cities, towns and villages in Barbados
