= Goodland, Barbados =

Goodland is a populated place in the parish of Saint Michael, Barbados.

== See also ==
- List of cities, towns and villages in Barbados
