= Ellerton, Barbados =

Coordinates: 13°08′N 59°33′W

Ellerton is a populated place in the parish of Saint George, Barbados.

== See also ==
- List of cities, towns and villages in Barbados
