= Cherry Grove, Barbados =

Coordinates: 13°09′N 59°31′W

Cherry Grove is a populated place in the parish of Saint John, Barbados. Cherry Grove is mainly a residential area. There is a grocery store, a bar & deli, and the Cherry Grove Gospel Hall.

== See also ==
- List of cities, towns and villages in Barbados
