= West Terrace =

Coordinates: 13.1482°N 59.6332°W

West Terrace is a populated place in the parish of Saint James, Barbados. The National Cultural Foundation of Barbados is located in West Terrace. It is home of the West Terrace Primary School.

== See also ==
- List of cities, towns and villages in Barbados
