= Kendal, Barbados =

Populated place in Saint John, Barbados

Coordinates: 13°09′N 59°30′W

Kendal is a populated place in the parish of Saint John, Barbados.

== See also ==
- List of cities, towns and villages in Barbados
