= Cane Vale =

Populated place in Barbados

Coordinates: 13°03′N 59°32′W

Cane Vale is a populated place in the parish of Christ Church, Barbados.

== See also ==
- List of cities, towns and villages in Barbados
