= Scarborough, Barbados =

Coordinates: 13°03′N 59°32′W

Scarborough is a populated place in the parish of Christ Church, Barbados. It is a coastal area located at the far southern tip of Barbados. Scarborough has only one road with "small shacks and houses" along it.

== See also ==
- List of cities, towns and villages in Barbados
