= Bowmanston =

Populated place in Barbados

Coordinates: 13°10′N 59°31′W

Bowmanston is a populated place in the parish of Saint John, Barbados. It is the home of the Bowmanston water pumping station.

== See also ==
- List of cities, towns and villages in Barbados
