= Sherbourne, Barbados =

Town in Barbados

Coordinates: 13°10′N 59°31′W

Sherbourne is a populated place in the parish of Saint John, Barbados. Sherbourne is mainly a residential area, located south of Highway 3C. It is home of the Sherbourne New Testament Church of God.

== See also ==
- List of cities, towns and villages in Barbados
