= Worthing, Barbados =

Populated place in Barbados

Worthing
- Town
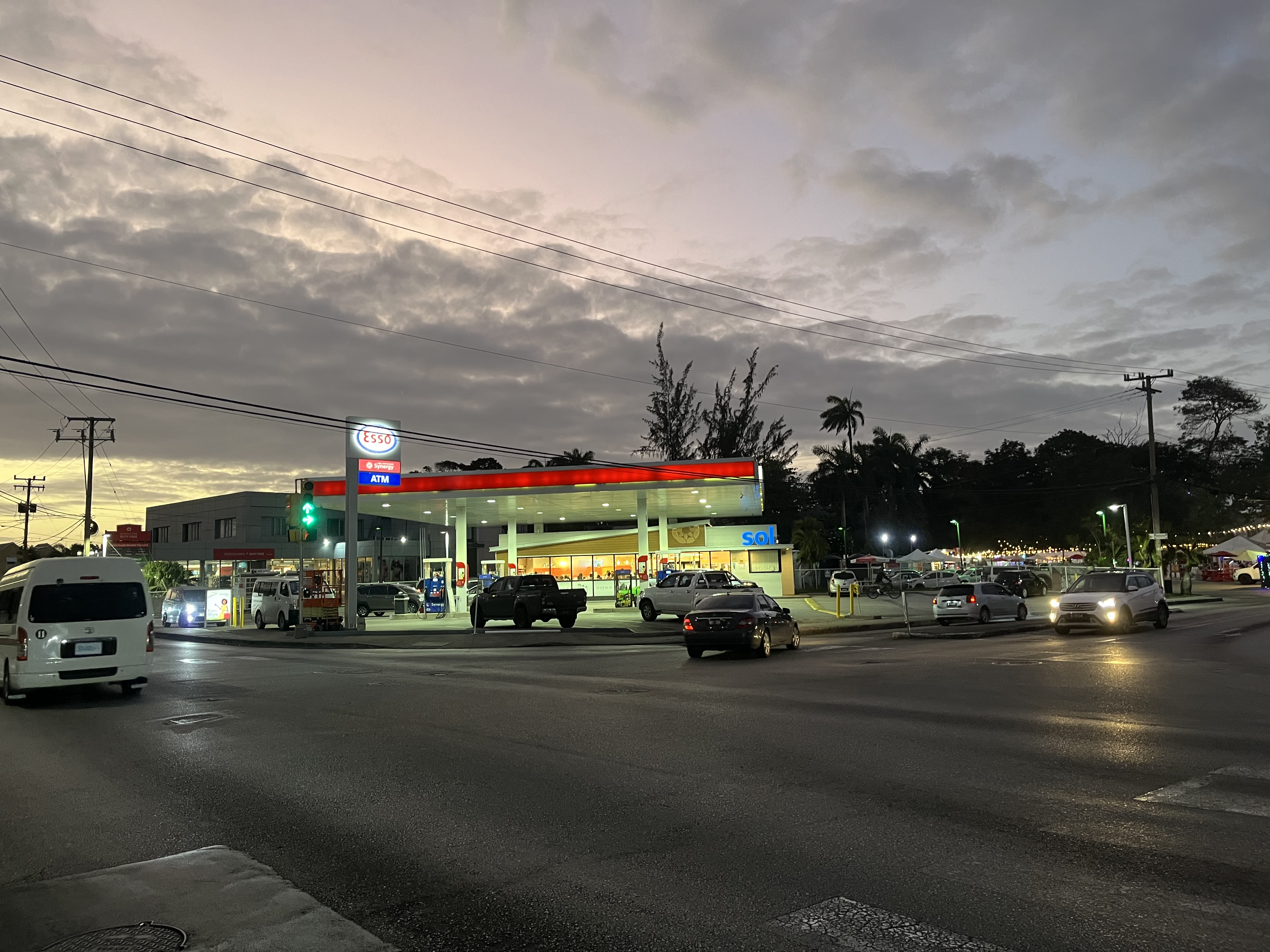
- Interactive map of Worthing
- Parish: Christ Church

Worthing is a town located in the province of Christ Church, Barbados. It is named after the English town of Worthing, and is west of another Sussex namesake, the village of Hastings.
