= Callenders =

Populated place in Christ Church, Barbados

Callenders is a populated place in the parish of Christ Church, Barbados.

== See also ==
- List of cities, towns and villages in Barbados
