= Constant, Barbados =

Populated place in Saint George, Barbados

Coordinates: 13°07′N 59°33′W

Constant is a populated place in the parish of Saint George, Barbados.

== See also ==
- List of cities, towns and villages in Barbados
