= Venture, Barbados =

Community in Barbados

Coordinates: 13°11′N 59°31′W

Venture is a populated place in the parish of Saint John, Barbados. Venture is mainly a residential area, located at Highway Y. It is home of the Trinity United Pentecostal Church.

== See also ==
- List of cities, towns and villages in Barbados
