= Castle Grant, Barbados =

Populated place in Saint Joseph, Barbados

Coordinates: 13°12′N 59°33′W

Castle Grant is a populated place in the parish of Saint Joseph, Barbados.

== See also ==
- List of cities, towns and villages in Barbados
