= Pie Corner =

Community in Barbados

Coordinates: 13°18′N 59°35′W

Pie Corner is a community in the parish of Saint Lucy, Barbados. It is located in the North Eastern region of the parish.

== See also ==
- List of cities, towns and villages in Barbados
