= Hillaby, Barbados =

Hillaby
- Town
- Location in Barbados
- Coordinates: 13°12′36″N 59°35′09″W
- Country: Barbados
- Parish: Saint Thomas
- Elevation: 300 m (985 ft)

Population (2012)
  - Total: 478
- Time zone: UTC-04:00 (AST)
- Area code: +1 246

Hillaby is a community on the borders of parishes Saint Thomas and Saint Andrew in Barbados. Historically it has always been referred to as Hillaby in St. Thomas it is the top third of the village which is in St. Andrew, with the greater area in St. Thomas.
