= French Village =

French Village may refer to:

== Places ==
- French Village, Barbados
- French Village, Missouri
- French Village, Nova Scotia

== Arts, entertainment, and media ==
- Un village français (A French Village), a French television drama series

== See also ==
Category:Villages in France
