= Branchbury =

Coordinates: 13°11′N 59°33′W

Branchbury is a populated place in the parish of Saint Joseph, Barbados.

== See also ==
- List of cities, towns and villages in Barbados
