= Jason Hinds (Barbadian cricketer) =

Barbadian cricketer (born 1984)

Personal information
- Born: 15 February 1984 (age 42); Saint James, Barbados
- Source: Cricinfo, 13 November 2020

Jason Hinds (born 15 February 1984) is a Barbadian cricketer. He played in one Twenty20 match for the Barbados cricket team in 2010.

== See also ==
- List of Barbadian representative cricketers
