= Welches, Barbados =

Populated place in Christ Church, Barbados

Coordinates: 13°03′N 59°33′W

Welches is a populated place in the parish of Christ Church, Barbados. It is a coastal area located on the south coast of Barbados. Welches Beach .

A sea wall was constructed in Welches to protect the coastal highway. (Note: "It involves the construction of a sea wall approximately 215 metres long to protect the coastal highway at Welches, Christ Church. The project commenced in September 1999 and is expected to be completed by February 2001.") Its construction began in 1999, and it is around 215 meters in length.

== Business ==
Some guesthouses and inns exist in Welches. The International Refills Company Ltd. is located in Welches, and is involved in aspects of diaper disposal components and systems.

== See also ==
- List of cities, towns and villages in Barbados
