= Charnocks, Barbados =

Populated place in Barbados

Coordinates: 13°05′N 59°30′W

Charnocks is a town located in the province of Christ Church, Barbados. Charnocks is known for its sugar plantation.
