= Seawell, Barbados =

Populated place in Barbados

Seawell is a town located in the parish of Christ Church, Barbados.
