= Conset Bay =

Bay on the east coast of Barbados

Coordinates: 13°11′N 59°28′W

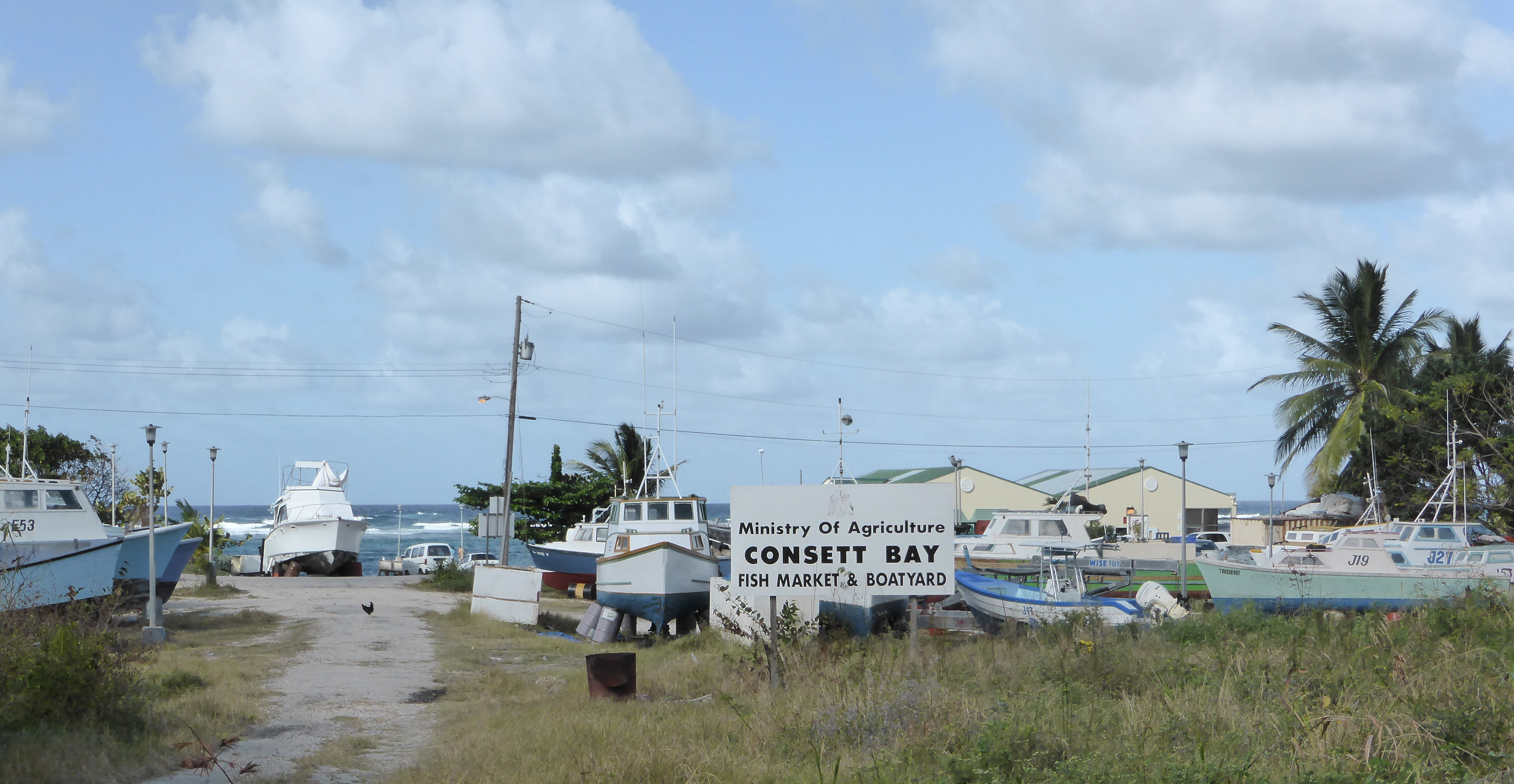
Late afternoon in January the Boat Yard at Consett Bay is quiet.

Conset Bay is a bay on the east coast of Barbados. Near the community of St. Marks, it lies off the southeastern shoreline of the Parish of St. John.
