= French Village, Barbados =

Populated place in the parish

Coordinates: 13.2640°N 59.6065°W

French Village is a populated place in the parish of Saint Peter, Barbados.

== See also ==
- List of cities, towns and villages in Barbados
