= Sarah Kirnon =

West Indian chef and entrepreneur

- Born: Leicestershire, England, U.K.
- Culinary career
- Cooking style: Caribbean cuisine
- Previous restaurant: Miss Ollie's (2012-20)

Sarah Kirnon is a West Indian chef. Kirnon owned and operated Miss Ollie's, an Afro-Caribbean restaurant in Oakland, California, from 2012 until 2019, when she announced she would close the restaurant to reopen the space as a non-profit incubator for Black chefs, artists, musicians and other creators.

== Early life and education ==
Sarah Kirnon was born in the 1960s in Leicestershire, England. Her mother is Barbadian and her father, Antiguan. She identifies as West Indian. At the age of four, her parents sent her to Gall Hill, Saint John, Barbados to live with her maternal grandmother and great-grandmother. Kirnon credits her time in Barbados with instilling a love for food. Her grandmother and uncles raised produce and animals on their farm, using the ingredients in daily cooking. At age thirteen, she moved back to England.

In 1999, Kirnon moved to San Francisco.

== Career ==
After relocating to San Francisco, Kirnon was chef at Emmy's Spaghetti Shack, followed by Front Porch. Eventually, she moved to Oakland to serve as chef at Hibiscus, where she created contemporary Caribbean food. In January 2012, she left Hibiscus, announcing that she would open a restaurant in downtown Oakland named Miss Ollie's, named after her grandmother who died in 2011.

In December 2012, Miss Ollie's opened in Swan's Marketplace in Oakland. The restaurant specialized in Caribbean cuisine. Menu items included many favorites from her childhood, such as fried chicken, saltfish and ackee, and goat curry. In 2016, Kirnon and Miss Ollie's were featured in the documentary Hungry. Miss Ollie's was named one of the top 100 restaurants in the San Francisco Bay Area in 2018 and 2019 by the San Francisco Chronicle.

Kirnon was chef-in-residence at Elda in San Francisco from September until November 2020. She served Caribbean take out meals, including dishes found at Miss Ollie's. During this time Kirnon started to re-examine the concept of the brick and mortar restaurant because of the impact the COVID-19 pandemic had on the restaurant industry. She believed that pop-ups and smaller establishments, with lower overhead and smaller staffs, would be more common after the pandemic. Weeks after the residency ended, Kirnon announced she would close Miss Ollie's at the end of the year to reopen the space as Sanctuary, a non-profit business incubator for Black chefs, musicians, artists and other creatives.
