= Clapham, Barbados =

Populated place in Barbados

Coordinates: 13°05′N 59°35′W

Clapham is a town located in the province of Christ Church, Barbados.
