= Heywoods Beach =

- Location within Barbados
- Coordinates: 13.261978°N 59.643388°W
- Country: Barbados
- Parish: St. Peter
- Time zone: UTC-4 (AST)
  - Summer (DST): UTC-4 (Not observed)

Heywoods Beach is a beach in Saint Peter, Barbados.
