= Hastings, Barbados =

Hastings
- Village
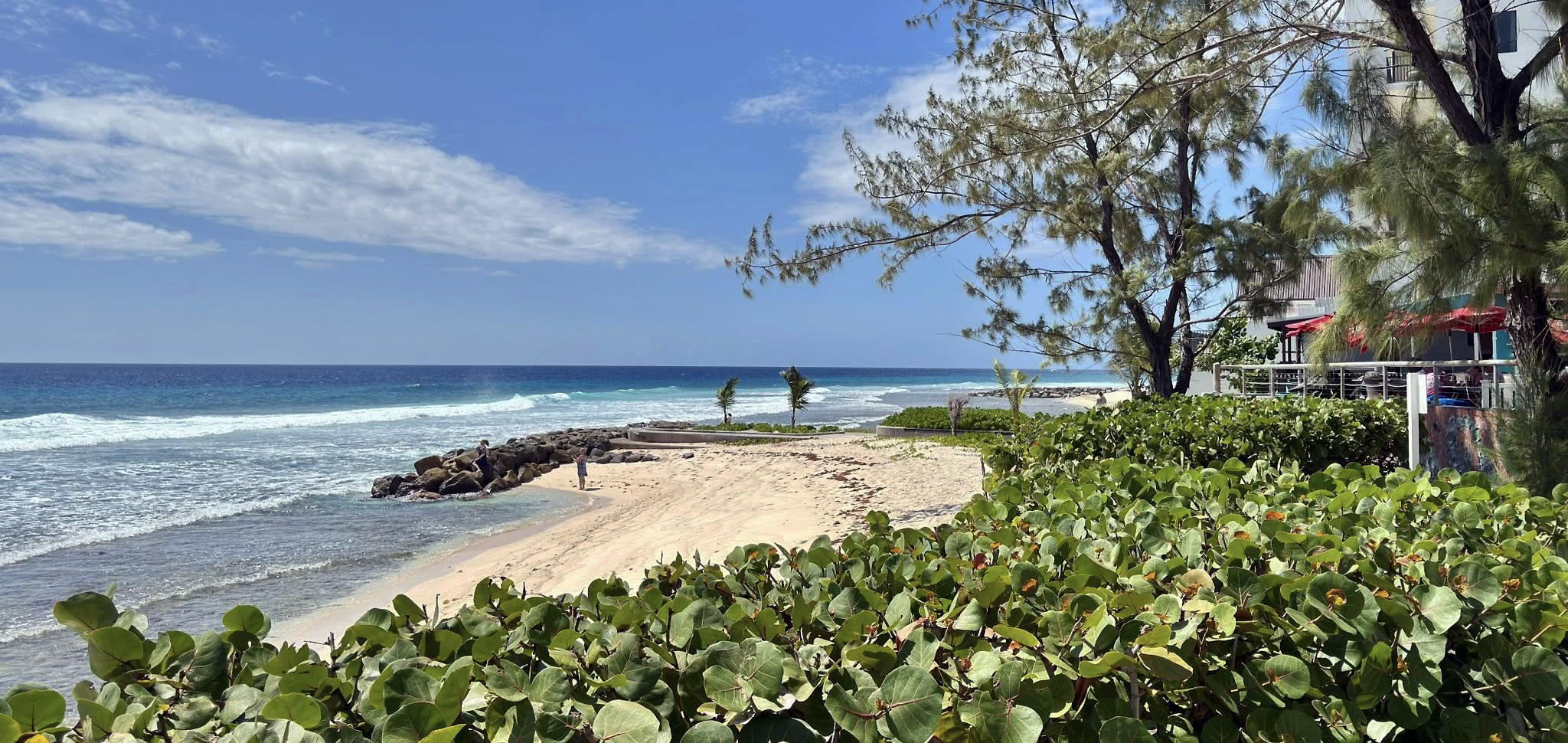
- View of beach in Hastings

- Location in Barbados
- Coordinates: 13°04′32″N 59°35′50″W
- Country: Barbados
- Parish: Christ Church
- Elevation: 39 ft (12 m)

Population (2010)
  - Total: 1,500
- Time zone: UTC-04:00 (AST)
- Area code: 246

Hastings is a small village and beach resort in the parish of Christ Church, Barbados on the island's south-western coast. It has beautiful white sandy beaches and is often a location for surfing on the island. Barbados' longest boardwalk, Richard Haynes Boardwalk currently starts from here, and runs Eastward to the nearby community of Rockley. A Courtyard by Marriott hotel is located in Hastings.There is also a Hotel Indigo, on the beach in Hastings

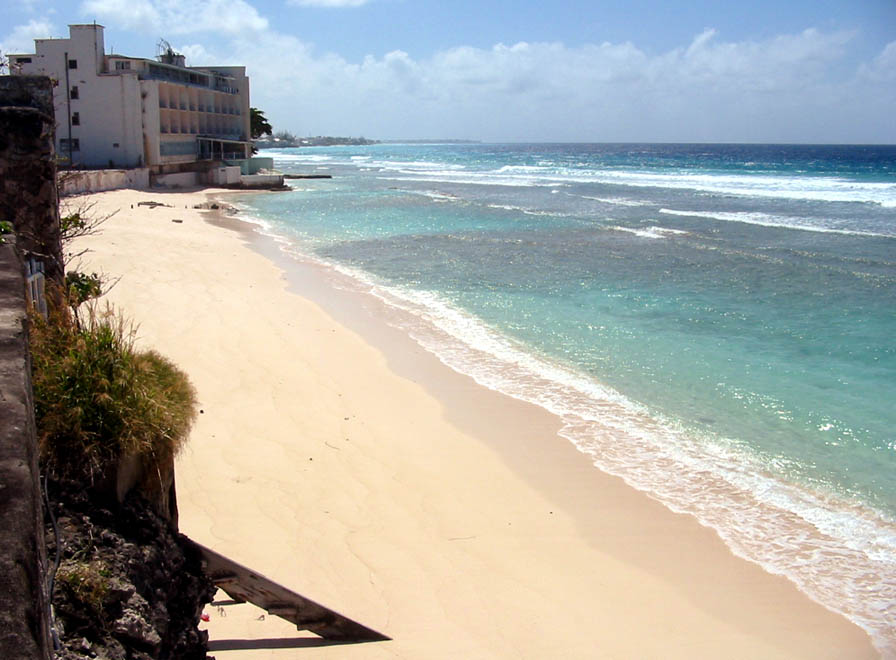
Hastings Beach in mid-April, 2005

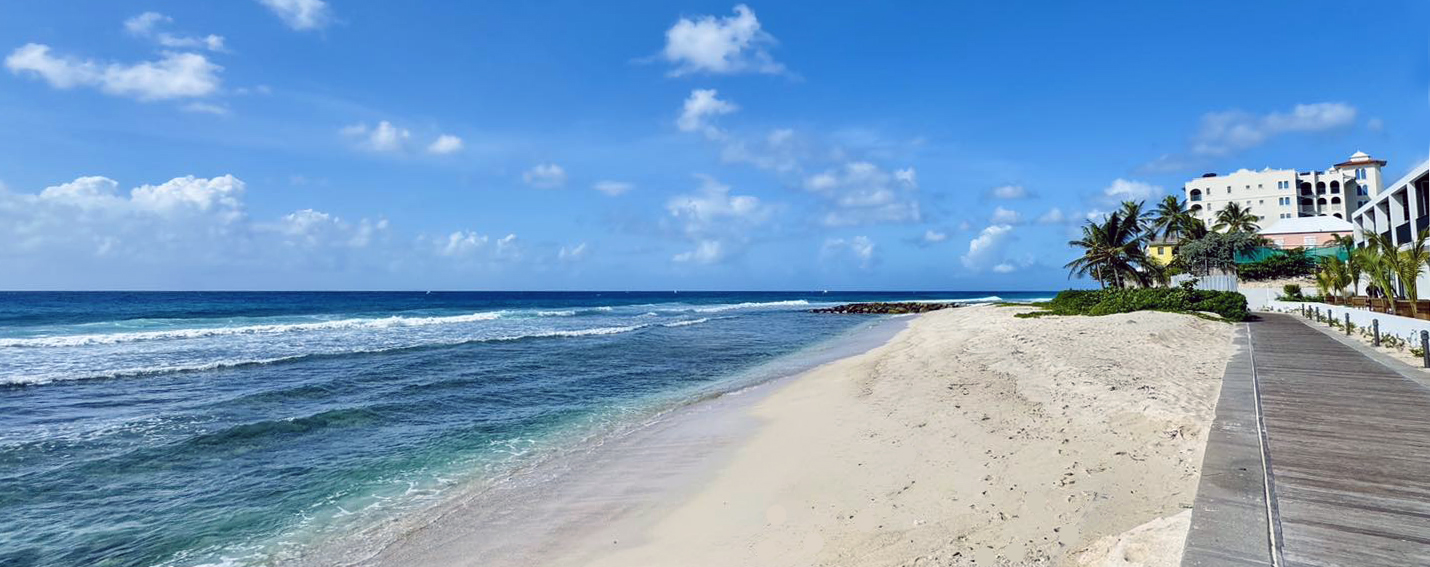
Hastings Beach, December 2025

== See also ==
- List of cities, towns and villages in Barbados
