= Hallam Cole =

Barbadian cricketer (1874–1932)

Personal information
- Born: 1 June 1874; Saint Michael, Barbados
- Died: 15 March 1932 (aged 57); Christ Church, Barbados
- Source: Cricinfo, 13 November 2020

Hallam Cole (1 June 1874 – 15 March 1932) was a Barbadian cricketer. He played in twenty-two first-class matches for the Barbados cricket team from 1894 to 1908.

== See also ==
- List of Barbadian representative cricketers
