= Six Cross Roads, Barbados =

Village in Barbados

Six Cross Roads
- Village
- Interactive map of Six Cross Roads
- Parish: Saint Philip

Six Cross Roads is an old village in the Parish of Saint Philip in Barbados.

== History ==
The reason this village was referred to as such is because of the unique six roads it has extending from a central roundabout.

At Six Cross Roads, Barbados Highways 6 and 6b, coming from the south, join Highway 5, while Sunbury Road and Congo Road lead north. On Sunbury Road is the Sunbury Plantation House and Museum.

== Subdivisions and Hamlets ==
Six Cross Roads is the regional center for the south east of the island of Barbados. It is the homeof the Princess Margaret Secondary School, It has several amenities, including a post office, a pharmacy, a supermarket, a petrol station, a branch of the BNB (Barbados National Bank) and a policlinic.

Residential subdivisions are Farm Road (North East), Marchfield Village (North West) and Emerald Park (South).

Outlying districts are Blades, Hampton, Highland, Kirtons, and Four Roads. Four Roads is the location of the Medical Clinic and a primary school.

Today, the village has been sectioned off and sold for retail and housing purposes.
