= Yorkshire, Barbados =

Town in Barbados

Coordinates: 13.103°N 59.515°W

Yorkshire is a town located in the province of Christ Church, Barbados. It is located about 13 kilometres (8.1 mi) east of Bridgetown.
