= Mangrove, Barbados =

Coordinates: 13°06′N 59°28′W

Mangrove is a populated place in Barbados.

== See also ==
- List of cities, towns and villages in Barbados
