= Wanstead, Barbados =

Coordinates: 13°08′N 59°37′W

Wanstead is a populated place in Barbados.

== See also ==
- List of cities, towns and villages in Barbados
