= Maxwell Hill, Barbados =

Populated place in Barbados

Coordinates: 13°04′N 59°34′W

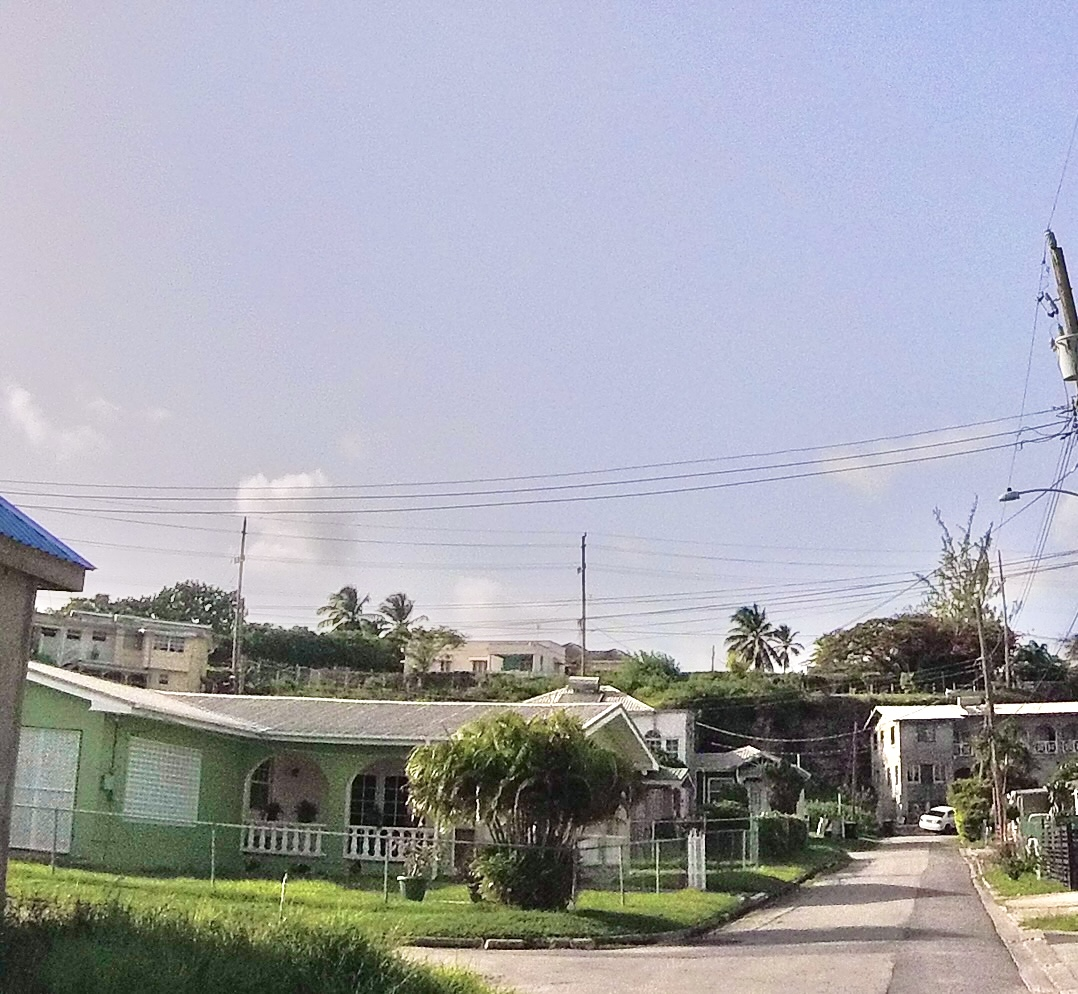
Maxwell Hill, Barbados (The hill in the background)

Maxwell Hill is a town located in the province of Christ Church, Barbados. Maxwell Hill is also a shipping point where crops and sugar in nearby plantations are exported to other parts of the country.
