= Newton Terrace, Barbados =

Populated place in Barbados

Coordinates: 13°05′N 59°32′W

Newton Terrace, Barbados is a town located in the province of Christ Church, Barbados.
