= Maureen Bruce =

Scottish ballerina

- Born: 1 May 1930 (age 94); Edinburgh
- Occupation: Principal dancer
- Years active: 1947–1990
- Career
- Former groups: Sadler's Wells Theatre Ballet, Sadler's Wells Ballet
- Dances: Facade, Les Rendezvous, Pastorale, Cafe des Sports, Saudades

Maureen Bruce was a principal dancer with the Sadler's Wells Theatre Ballet and the Sadler's Wells Ballet. Born in Edinburgh on 1 May 1930, she trained with Marjorie Middleton in Edinburgh, joined the Wells School in September 1947 and graduated to the Sadler's Wells Theatre Ballet in December of the same year.

== Career ==
Maureen Bruce's first solo part was in the ballet Tritsch-Tratsch in which reviewers described her 'bubbling personality' that was again revealed in Frederick Ashton's ballets Facade and Les Rendezvous. Recognised as a "classical dancer of style" her versatility was confirmed in two of her creations: Amour in Pastorale and Hedonist in Cafe des Sports. Bruce's first major creation was the role of the Princess in Alfred Rodrigues' ballet Saudades (Nostalgia) which was premiered at the Royal Court in Liverpool on 13 October 1955. Bruce was transferred to the Sadler's Wells Ballet in 1956.

Maureen Bruce achieved a wider audience as one of the dancers in Margaret Dale's groundbreaking BBC television series for children Steps into Ballet in 1954.

Bruce married another principal dancer of the Sadler's Wells Theatre Ballet, Donald Britton, in 1952.

After leaving the Sadler's Wells company in 1958 Maureen Bruce taught ballet in Edinburgh, Fife and the Scottish Borders before moving to Devon in 1963 where she continued to teach until 1990.

== See also ==
- Donald Britton
