= Hopewell, Christ Church =

Settlement in Barbados

Coordinates: 13°03′N 59°31′W

Hopewell is a small rural settlement in Christ Church Parish, Barbados.
