= Edey, Barbados =

Suburb in Barbados

Coordinates: 13°06′N 59°32′W

Edey is a suburb located in the province of Christ Church, Barbados. Edey is located just by the Frere Pilgrim and Ridgeview.
