= Bel Air, Barbados =

Bel Air
- Village
- Interactive map of Bel Air
- Parish: Saint Philip

Bel Air, or Belair, is a village in Saint Philip Parish in Barbados.

The area is best known for Belair Bay, a mostly-residential beach without active lifeguards.
