= Bissex (surname) =

Bissex is a surname. Notable people with the surname include:

- Mike Bissex (born 1944), English cricketer
- Rachel Bissex (1956–2005), American folk singer-songwriter
