= Foul Bay, Barbados =

Village and beach in Barbados

Coordinates: 13°06′N 59°27′W

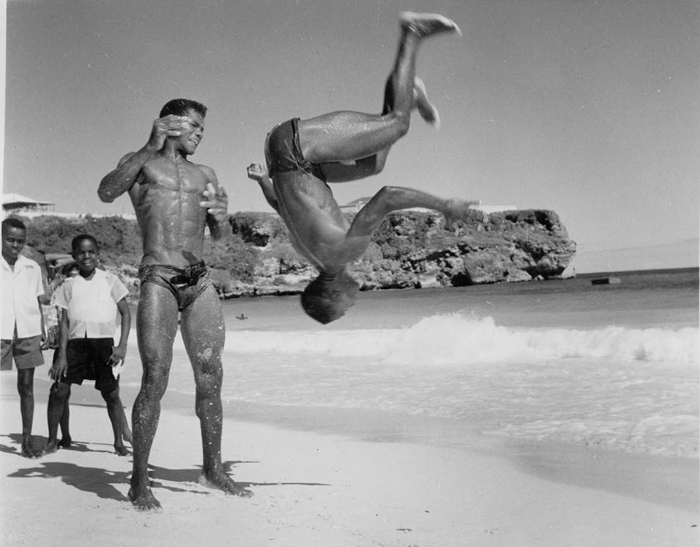
Barbadians exercising at Foul Bay in 1955

Foul Bay refers to a bay, beach, and village in Saint Philip Parish, alongside the southeast coast of Barbados.

Foul Bay Beach is used for excursions, picnics, wedding ceremonies, and receptions by locals and visitors to the island. It is also a nesting area for hawksbill sea turtles.

There are different explanations of how the area got its name. Up to the mid-1950s fishermen used to sell their catch on Foul Bay Beach. The fish were de-scaled and gutted on the spot. The smell was foul, hence the name. Another story claims the name is a misspelling of "Fowl" Bay, and that the area once hosted many migrating birds. Late 18th and early 19th Century Documents pertaining to British slavery in Barbados show the area's name as both "Foul" and "Fowl."

As the local government developed the fishing industry, designated fish markets were set up in Oistins, Speightstown, and Bridgetown. Foul Bay Beach was cleaned by the National Conservation Commission, and it continues to be maintained by a team from the Commission who remove leaves, seaweed, and litter from the beach.
