= Farley Hill, Saint Peter, Barbados =

Coordinates: 13°16′N 59°35′W

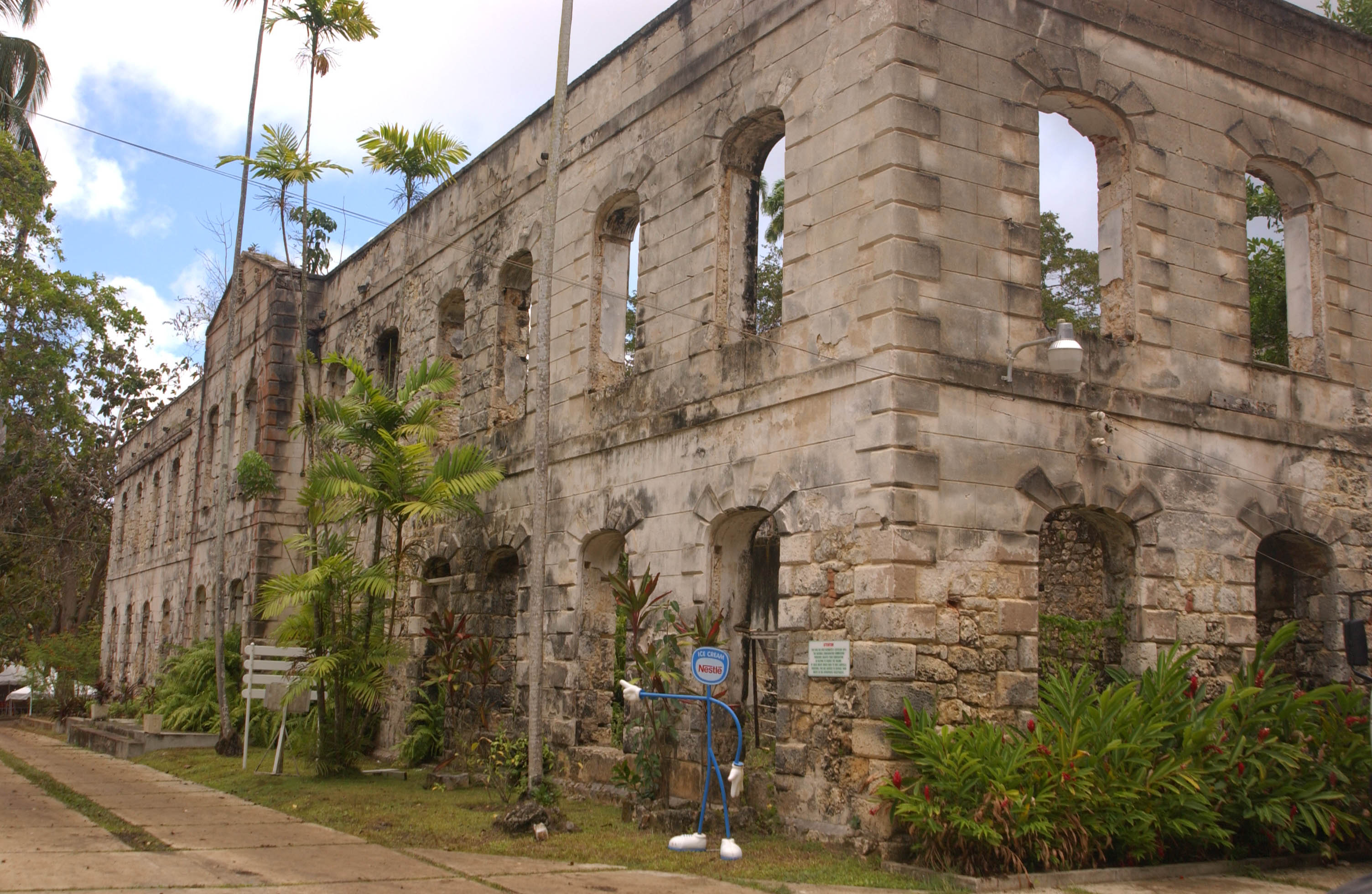
Ruins of the former Grenade Hall Plantation House in Farley Hill, St. Peter

Farley Hill is a national park in Saint Peter, Barbados. It is on the site of Grenade Hall Plantation, established in the seventeenth century.
