= Saint Joseph, Barbados =

Saint Joseph
- Parish
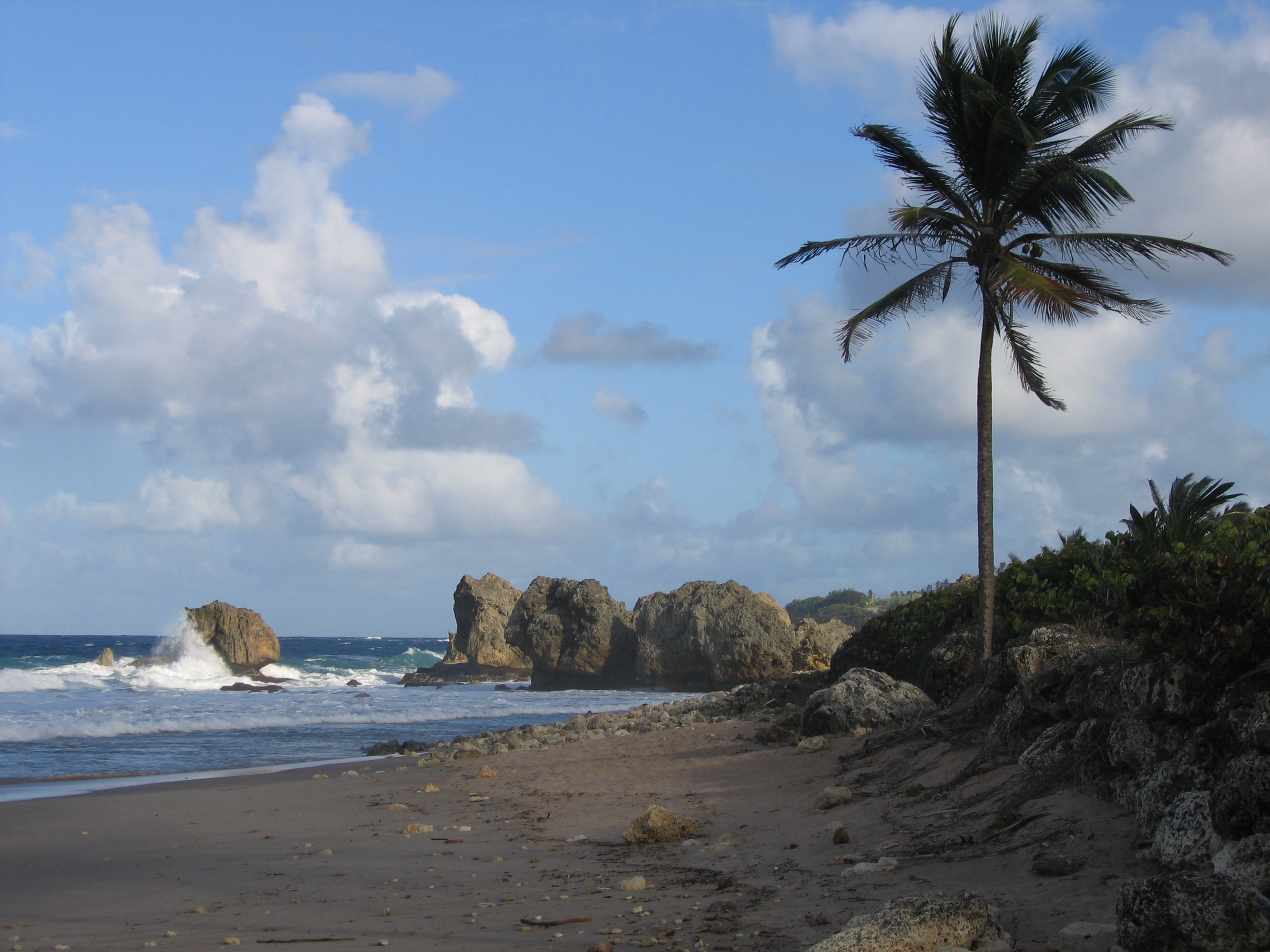

- Map of Barbados showing Saint Joseph
- Coordinates: 13°12′N 59°32′W
- Country: Barbados
- Largest city: Bathsheba

Government
  - Type: Parliamentary democracy
  - Parliamentary seats: 1

Area
  - Total: 26 km^{2} (10 sq mi)

Population (2010 census)
  - Total: 6,620
  - Density: 250/km^{2} (660/sq mi)
- ISO 3166 code: BB-06

The parish of St. Joseph in Barbados is on the eastern side of the island. The parish is home to two of the more notable botanic gardens in the country - Flower Forest and Andromeda Gardens. Parts of St. Joseph are also referred to as the Scotland District, a reference to the appearance of the landscape.

One of the highest points in the island is Chimborazo in Saint Joseph. Saint Joseph is also the home of the "Soup Bowl" where international surfing competitions are held.

== Geography ==
=== Populated places ===
The parish contains the following towns, villages, localities, settlements, communities and hamlets:

- Airy Hill
- Bathsheba
- Bissex
- Bissex Hill
- Blackmans
- Bonwell
- Bowling Alley Hill
- Braggs Hill
- Branchbury
- Buckden House
- Bushy Park
- Cambridge
- Canefield
- Cane Garden
- Castle Grant
- Cattlewash
- Cattlewash Beach
- Chimborazo
- Cleaver's Hill
- Coffee Gully
- Dark Hole
- East Coast Road
- Easy Hall
- Frizers
- Fruitful Hill
- Gaggs Hill
- Hackeltons
- Hackleton's Cliff
- Hackeltons Road
- Hillcrest
- Hillswick
- Horse Hill
- Joe's River
- Joe's River Bridge
- Lammings
- Lower Parks
- Mellowes
- Mellowes Hill
- Melvin Hill
- Naniki Restaurant
- Parks
- Parks Road
- Parris Hill
- Richmond
- Round Rock
- Saint Elizabeths
- Saint Elizabeth's Village
- Saint Sylvans
- Seniors
- Spa Hill
- Springfield
- Springfield Road
- Suriname
- Tent Bay
- Upper Parks
- Vaughan's Land

=== Parishes bordering Saint Joseph ===
- Saint Andrew - North
- Saint George - South
- Saint John - Southeast
- Saint Thomas - West

== Politics ==
Saint Joseph covers one geographical constituency for the House of Assembly:

- Saint Joseph
