= Saint John, Barbados =

Saint John
- Parish
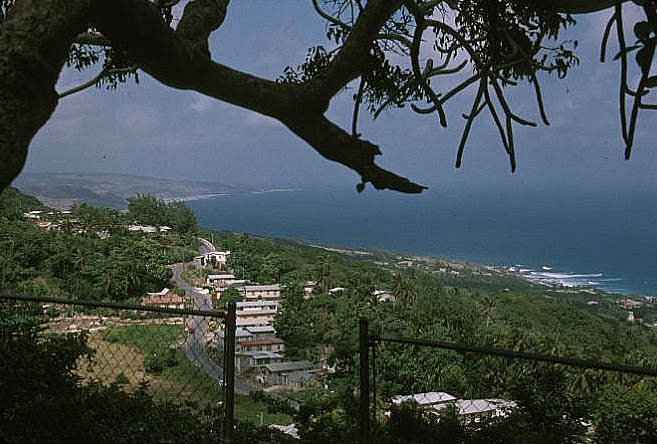

- Map of Barbados showing Saint John
- Coordinates: 13°10′N 59°29′W
- Country: Barbados

Government
  - Type: Parliamentary democracy
  - Parliamentary seats: 1

Area
  - Total: 34 km^{2} (13 sq mi)

Population (2010 census)
  - Total: 8,963
  - Density: 260/km^{2} (680/sq mi)
- ISO 3166 code: BB-05

The parish of St. John in Barbados is on the eastern side of the island. It is home to one of its secondary schools, The Lodge School and to the St. John's Parish Church. In its southeastern corner the shoreline turns northward, forming the small Conset Bay.

== Geography ==
=== Populated places ===
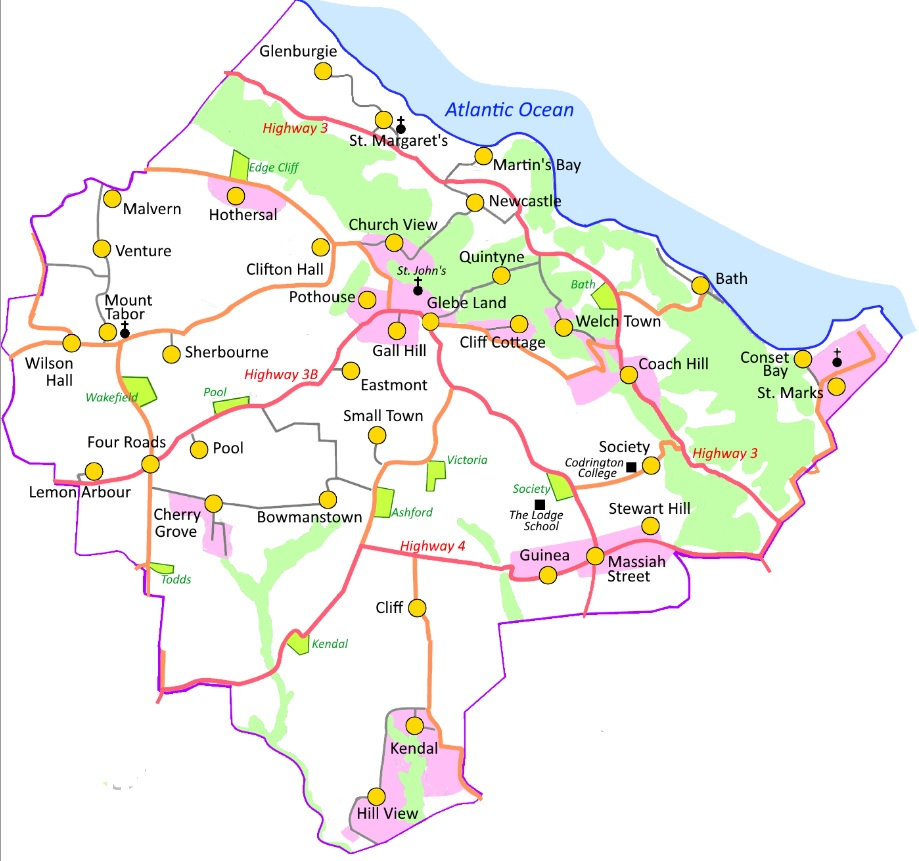

The parish contains the following towns, villages, localities, settlements, communities, and hamlets:

- Ashford Plantation
- Bath
- Bowmanston
- Cherry Grove
- Church View
- Cliff Cottage
- Cliff Plantation
- Clifton Hall
- Coach Hill
- Conset Bay
- Eastmont
- Edge Cliff
- Edey Village
- Foster Hall
- Four Roads
- Gall Hill
- Glebe Land
- Glenburnie
- Guinea
- Haynes Hill
- Hill View
- Hothersal
- Kendal
- Kendal Plantation
- Lemon Arbour
- Malvern
- Massiah Street
- Moores
- Mount Pleasant
- Mount Tabor
- Newcastle
- Palmers
- Pool
- Pool Plantation
- Pothouse
- Quintyne
- Rosegate
- St Margarets
- St Marks
- Sargeant Street
- Sealy Hall
- Sherbourne
- Small Hope
- Small Town
- Society
- Society Plantation
- Spooners
- Stewart Hill
- Venture
- Wakefield Plantation
- Welchtown
- Wilson Hill

=== Parishes bordering Saint John ===
- Saint George (west)
- Saint Joseph (north)
- Saint Philip (southeast)

== Politics ==
Saint John covers one geographical constituency for the House of Assembly:

- Saint John

== Notable people ==
- Sarah Kirnon, chef
