= Sunbury, Barbados =

Coordinates: 13°07′N 59°29′W

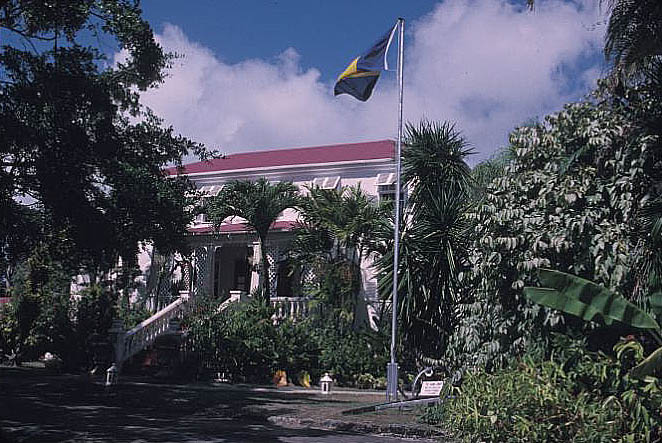
Plantation House

Sunbury is a village in Saint Philip Parish in Barbados.

== History ==
The Sunbury Plantation House is open to tours and dates back to its construction by Matthew Chapman in 1660.
