= Saint Peter, Barbados =

Saint Peter
- Parish
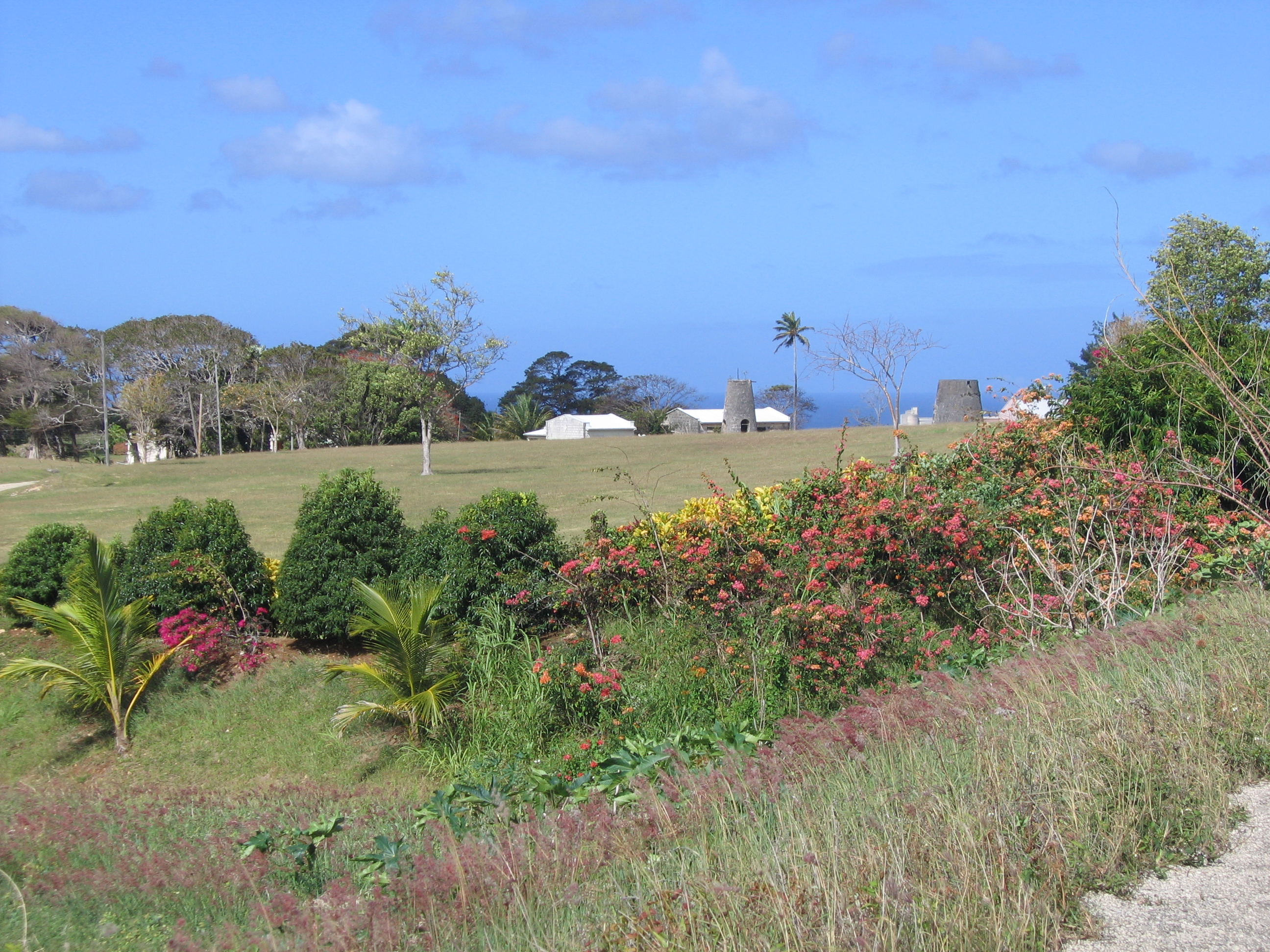
- A scenic shot of St. Peter

- Map of Barbados showing Saint Peter
- Coordinates: 13°15′N 59°37′W
- Country: Barbados
- Largest city: Speightstown

Government
  - Type: Parliamentary democracy
  - Parliamentary seats: 1

Area
  - Total: 34 km^{2} (13 sq mi)

Population (2010 census)
  - Total: 11,300
  - Density: 330/km^{2} (860/sq mi)
- ISO 3166 code: BB-09

The parish of St. Peter is one of eleven in the Caribbean island country of Barbados. It is named after the Christian Apostle and patron saint, Saint Peter. It is located in the north of Barbados, and is the only parish besides Saint Lucy that extends from the east coast to the west.

The Barbados "Platinum Coast," which extends through Saint Peter from the parish of Saint James just to the south, has helped to make Saint Peter a tourist hot spot. The parish is surrounded with white sand beaches, including those along Mullins Bay. Its topography includes rolling hills and terraces, some of which are still covered by sugar cane, which was the island's chief cash crop during its colonial period. Within Saint Peter are also large tourist sites such as the Port St. Charles and Port Ferdinand marinas. Other lavish resorts include Schooner Bay, St. Peter's Bay and The Palazzate.

== Geography ==
=== Populated places ===
The parish contains the following towns, villages, localities, settlements, communities and hamlets:

- Alleynedale
- Alleynedale Hall, formerly Cabbage Tree Hall
- Around-The-Town
- Ashburton Grove
- Ashton Hall
- Bakers
- Battaleys
- Benn Hill
- Benny Hall
- Black Bess
- Boscobelle
- Brevitor Hall
- Brevitor Hall North
- Brevitor Hall South
- The Castle: successively known as Sober Castle, Clement Castle, and Ellis Castle
- Castle Heights
- Castle Terrace
- Centipede Alley
- Cherry Tree Hill
- Church Hill
- Colleton
- Colleton Gardens
- Diamond Corner
- Douglas
- Ebworth
- Farley Hill
- Farm
- Farm Road
- Farrs
- Foster Hill
- Fourhill
- French Village
- Gays
- Gibbes
- Gibbes Bay
- Goddings Bay
- Haymans
- Hayman's Factory
- Haymans Road
- Heywoods
- Heywoods Beach
- Heywoods Heights
- Heywoods Terrace
- Hope Land
- Indian Ground
- Lakes
- Little Battaleys
- Luke Hill
- Mangrove
- Maynards
- Maynards Heights
- Maynards Ridge
- Maynards Road
- Maynards Tenantry
- Maynards Terrace
- Mile and a Quarter
- Moore Hill
- Mount
- Mount Brevitor
- Mount Prospect
- Mount Prospect
- Mullins
- Mullins Bay
- Mullins Beach
- Mullins Heights
- Mullins Road
- Mullins Terrace
- Orange Hill
- Oxford
- Pico Teneriffe
- Pleasant Hall
- Portland
- Portland Plantation
- Retreat
- Richmond Hill
- Road View
- Rock Hall
- Rockless
- Roebuck
- Rose Hill
- Sailor Hill
- Six Mens
- Six Men's Bay
- Speightstown (3,600)
- Speightstown By-Pass Road
- Station Hill
- Sunbury
- The Baltic
- The Choyce
- The Rock
- The Whim
- Vuemont
- Warleigh
- Warleigh Plantation
- Welchtown
- White Hall

==== Speightstown ====
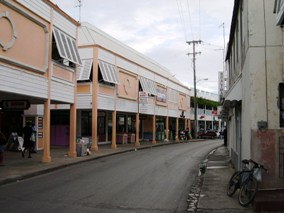
Speightstown, the second largest settlement on the island.

The area of Speightstown was the first major port and commercial centre of Barbados. The city is named after William Speight, a member of Barbados' first Assembly during the colonial years, and the former owner of the land on which the city arose. It has a long and colorful history reaching back to the 17th century when it served as one of the main ports connecting the island with the “mother country,” England. Back then Speightstown was sometimes called “Little Bristol” because of these trading connections with Bristol in England. This little village was the port that Admiral Ayscue could not take when he was dispatched by Cromwell to quell the insurrection in Barbados in 1649. The Barbadians were loyal to Charles I, and would not accept Oliver Cromwell as their protector. For six months Ayscue was unable to land in Barbados, and concentrated attacks on Speightstown were repelled by the small forts along the shore. The tiny island was landed only with the help of a defector who led Ayscue and his men to land at Oistins where they met with representatives of the island and signed what has become known as the Charter of Barbados. Signed in 1652, the agreement gave Barbados rights and privileges unheard of on any other island. In particular it guaranteed that Barbados could not be taxed without the consent of a Barbados General Assembly. Many historic buildings dating from colonial times, including Arlington House, still remain standing in the town and can be seen mostly along Queen Street, Church Street and Orange Street. Speightstown saw a lot of activity during the reign of the sugar industry and the day of the slave trade. Many slaves would have passed through this town, even if they were to be shipped on further to other islands or America.

Today Speightstown is busiest on weekends when locals and visitors come out to do their shopping and banking. Many stalls can be found along the streets hawking local and imported fruits and ground provisions. Although it had fallen into disrepair and neglect over the years, the area is now the focus of new initiatives for development. Speightstown Esplanade at Fort Denmark and the Fisheries Complex have been refurbished. Drainage in the area has been improved to prevent flooding. The jetty has been rebuilt and a modern ferry line may be established.

Port St. Charles is open for those who wish to enter the island by yacht. Speightstown hosts The Gallery of Caribbean Art, which showcases local and Caribbean artists.

=== Parishes bordering Saint Peter ===
- Saint Andrew - South-east
- Saint James - South
- Saint Lucy - North

=== Defined boundaries ===
- With St. Andrew: – Starting from the meeting point of the parishes of St. Peter, St. James and St. Andrew and continuing in an easterly direction to its junction with the public road leading from Rock Hall Plantation to Rock Hall Village: then in a north-westerly direction along this public road to its junction at Rock Hall Tenantry with a track leading to Roebuck Village; then along this track in a generally northerly direction to its junction at Roebuck Village with the unclassified public road leading from Four Hills Plantation to Indian Ground; then continuing in a generally northerly direction along this road to its junction with the public road leading from Orange Hill Plantation to Welchtown Plantation; then continuing in a northerly direction along this road to its junction at Welchtown Plantation with the public road leading from Farley Hill to Portland; then in a north-westerly direction along this road to its junction at Portland with the public road called Highway 1; then in an easterly and northerly direction along Highway 1 to the junction at Diamond Comer with the public road called Highway B; then in a generally easterly direction along Highway B passing through Nicholas and Cherry Tree Hill to the junction of this road with the public road leading to Boscobelle; then in a north-easterly direction along this road to the junction with the private road leading to Fosters Funland; then in a generally easterly direction along this road and along the southern section of the loop at the end; and then continuing in an easterly direction to the sea.
- With St. James: – Starting from the meeting point of the parishes of St. Peter, St. James and St. Andrew and continuing in an easterly direction to its junction with the public road leading from Rock Hall Plantation to Rock Hall Village: then in a north- westerly direction along this public road to its junction at Rock Hall Tenantry with a track leading to Roebuck Village; then along this track in a generally northerly direction to its junction at Roebuck Village with the unclassified public road leading from Four Hills Plantation to Indian Ground; then continuing in a generally northerly direction along this road to its junction with the public road leading from Orange Hill Plantation to Welchtown Plantation; then continuing in a northerly direction along this road to its junction at Welchtown Plantation with the public road leading from Farley Hill to Portland; then in a north-westerly direction along this road to its junction at Portland with the public road called Highway 1; then in an easterly and northerly direction along Highway 1 to the junction at Diamond Comer with the public road called Highway B; then in a generally easterly direction along Highway B passing through Nicholas and Cherry Tree Hill to the junction of this road with the public road leading to Boscobelle; then in a north-easterly direction along this road to the junction with the private road leading to Fosters Funland; then in a generally easterly direction along this road and along the southern section of the loop at the end; and then continuing in an easterly direction to the sea.
- With St. Lucy: – Starting from a point on the seashore directly west of the junction of Highway 1C and the public road leading from Shermans to Half Moon Fort, the line travels eastwards to the centre-line of the said road junction; then in a north-easterly direction along Highway 1C to its junction with the private (estate) road leading to Alleynedale Hall; then along this private road and diverting along the northern branch of this road so as to leave the plantation buildings in St. Peter to meet the public road called Highway A leading from Rose Hill to St. Lucy’s Church; then northwards along Highway A to its junction with the public road called Luke Hill; then along this public road in a north-easterly and northerly direction to the junction with the unclassified road leading to Castle Plantation; then along this road in an easterly and south- easterly direction to a point opposite the monument (B.l) placed on the eastern side; then in a north-easterly direction along the line joining this point and another monument (13.2) situate on the western side of an unclassified road at Lamberts and to the centre line of the road; then along this road in a north- westerly and north-easterly direction to its junction with the public road leading from Lamberts to Graveyard; then along this public road in an easterly, north- easterly and northerly direction to its junction with the unclassified road leading to Boscobelle; then along this road in a north-easterly, south-easterly and north- easterly direction to the centre of the bridge situate at the point just before the road turns to a south-easterly direction; then in a north-easterly direction (30“ 16') to the sea.

== Attractions of St. Peter ==
=== Farley Hill National Park ===
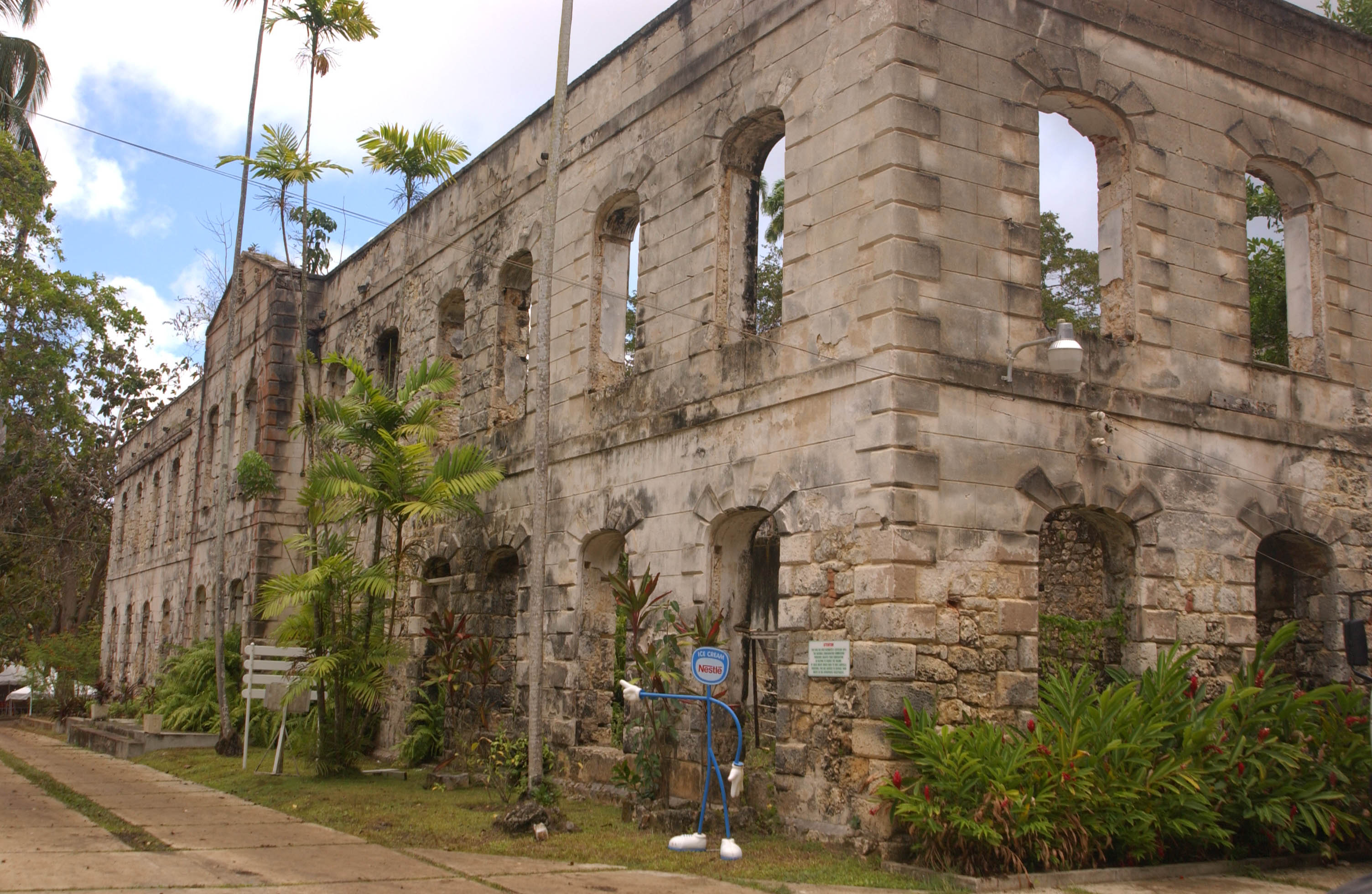
The ruins of Farley Hill

Farley Hill is a ruin of a Georgian mansion which was built by Sir Graham Briggs. Work started in 1818 and rooms were constantly being added over the next fifty years. Farley Hill was eventually regarded as the most impressive mansion in Barbados and in 1957 was used as Belfontaine Mansion in the famous film Island in the Sun. After the mansion was destroyed by fire in 1965, the property was acquired by the Barbados Government. On February 15, 1966, Queen Elizabeth II officially opened the grounds as the Farley Hill National Park. Situated high up on a hill overlooking Barbados' rugged Atlantic coast, Farley Hill is a picnic area, wedding venue, and vista point, featuring views of the east coast of Barbados. The forest of mahogany trees is transformed into the stage for musical and theatrical events several times a year, including the Barbados Jazz Festival and Gospelfest, among others.

=== Barbados Wildlife Reserve ===
The reserve is situated in a lush mahogany wood, across the road from Farley Hill National Park, and is primarily a monkey sanctuary for the Barbados Green Monkey. The monkeys and most of the other animals are free to roam.

=== St. Nicholas Abbey ===
St. Nicholas Abbey, which served as the plantation house for one of the most successful sugar plantations on Barbados, is one of the landmarks on Barbados. It is one of only three genuine Jacobean mansions in the Western Hemisphere. It is similar to the English Jacobean manor houses of the first half of the seventeenth century, of the period between the Tudor and Georgian styles of architecture.

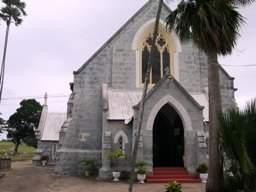
All Saints' Anglican Chapel

== Religion ==
Barbados was a British colony and retains many British traditions. Many of the churches are Anglican, Episcopal, Seventh-day Adventist, Methodist, Roman Catholic, Pentecostal, and others.

== Politics ==
Saint Peter covers one geographical constituency for the House of Assembly:

- St. Peter

== Notable people ==
- Sir John Gay Alleyne, 1st Baronet (1724 – 1801), owner of the Alleynedale Hall (formerly Cabbage Tree Hall) and St. Nicholas Abbey plantations, Speaker of the House of Assembly of Barbados, founder of The Alleyne School, and rum distiller
- Sir John Gay Newton Alleyne, 3rd Baronet (1820 – 1912), Warden of Dulwich College and industrial engineer in England, who designed the roof of St Pancras Railway Station, London
- Dennis Bovell MBE (born 22 May 1953) reggae guitarist, bassist, and record producer, in England
- Richard Clement (1754 – 1829), owner of the Black Bess and Clement Castle plantations
- Richard Clement (1832 - 1873), English cricketer
- Reynold Clement (1834 - 1905), English cricketer
