= Saint James, Barbados =

Parish in Barbados

Saint James
- Parish
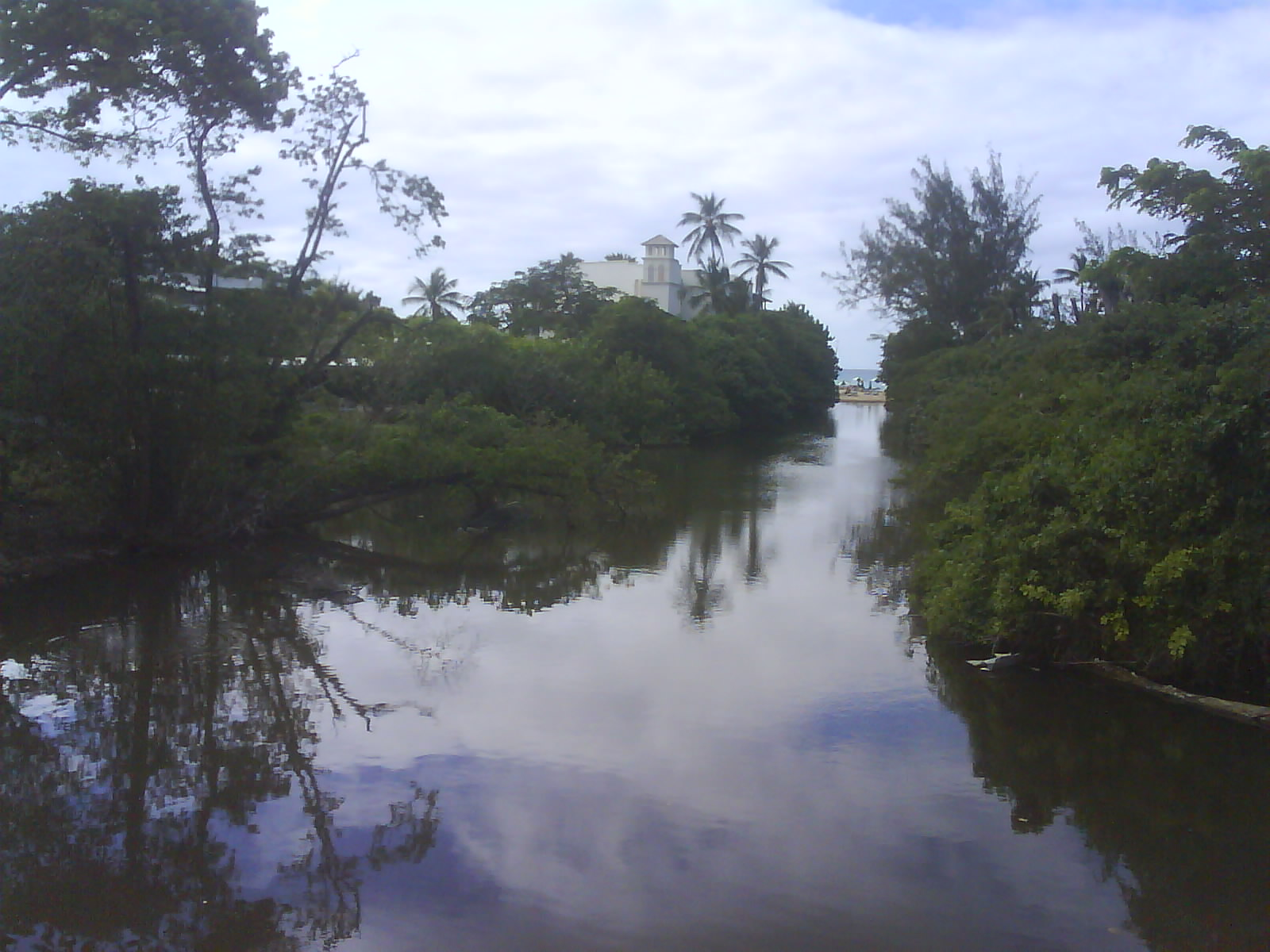

- Map of Barbados showing Saint James
- Coordinates: 13°13′N 59°37′W
- Country: Barbados
- Largest city: Holetown

Government
  - Type: Parliamentary democracy
  - Parliamentary seats: 3

Area
  - Total: 31 km^{2} (12 sq mi)

Population (2010 census)
  - Total: 28,498
  - Density: 920/km^{2} (2,400/sq mi)
- ISO 3166 code: BB-04

The parish of St. James is located in the western central part of the country of Barbados. Increasingly St. James is becoming known as the playground of the rich and famous, and as a haven for sun-starved tourists with its up-market hotel resorts.

In local colloquium, St. James was known as the "Gold Coast", but due to its ongoing popularity, it is now often referred to as the "Platinum Coast", reflective of the parish's many glitzy beach-front mansions, pristine beaches, luxury hotel resorts, and consistently high land prices.

The parish also has great historic significance, as it was here that the first British settlers landed in 1625. Under the authority of King James, the British claimed Barbados upon landing in St. James' present-day town of Holetown (formerly known as Jamestown, named after the King himself); this settlement turned Barbados into what would later be known colloquially as "Little England".

Noted for its shopping and restaurants in Holetown, Saint James, is central to Barbados' bustling tourist industry, with historical attractions including the St. James Parish Church and the Portvale Sugar Factory, one of the few remaining operational sugar factories on the island.

Though the beach area is a haven for wealthy tourists and foreign expatriates, St. James as a whole is far from exclusive. As one of the bigger parishes of Barbados, it is home to over 20,000 nationals in its various districts, across various social strata. The parish is home to the prestigious Queen's College, one of the foremost schools not only in Barbados, but also the Caribbean, founded over a century ago by British plantation owner Colonel Henry Drax. At its most rural, the parish's many villages (such as the seafront Fitts Village) are abuzz with activity, near-familial camaraderie, and an active social atmosphere.

== Geography ==
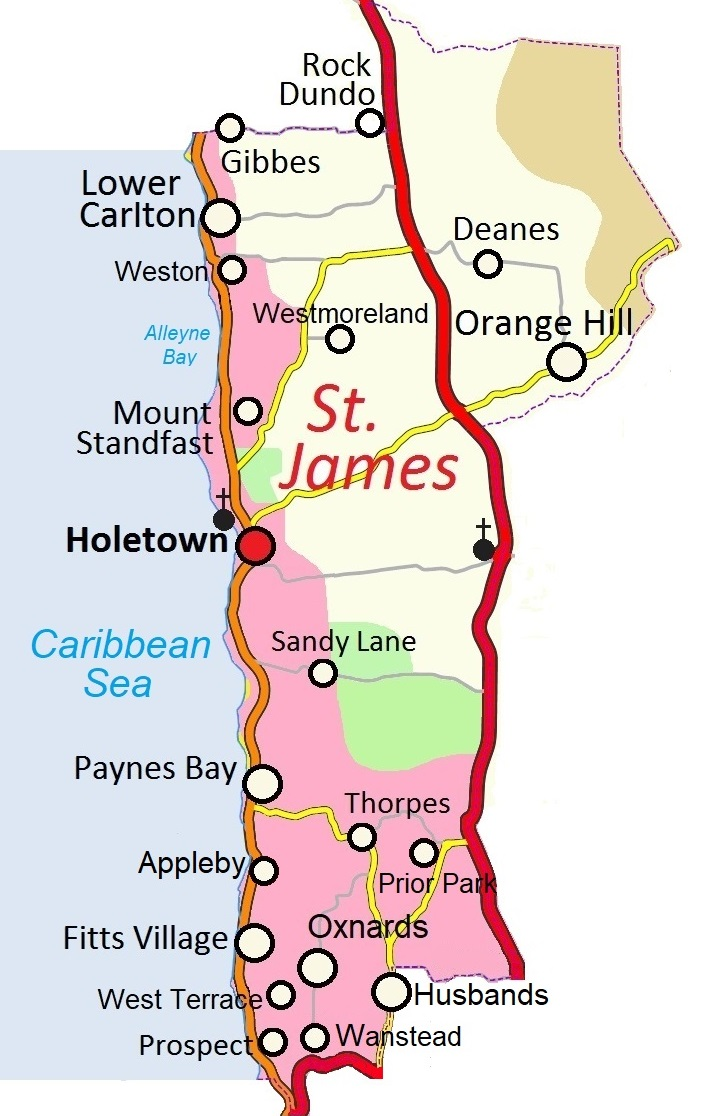
Saint James Parish, Barbados

=== Populated places ===
The parish contains the following towns, villages, localities, settlements, hamlets and neighbourhoods:

- Apes Hill, site of Apes Hill Golf Club
- Appleby, including Appleby Gardens
- Arch Hall, location of fire station
- Bagatelle Terrace including Bagatelle Yard
- Blowers
- Clermont
- Crystal Heights
- Deanes
- Derricks
- Durants
- Fitts Village
- Gibbes, on the border to St. Lucy parish
- Greenwich Village
- Halls Village
- Haynesville
- Holders Hill
- Holetown (1,595), including Jamestown Park
- Hoytes Village
- Husbands, including Husbands Gardens, Husbands Heights and Husbands Terrace
- Lancaster
- Lascelles
- Lazaretto
- Lower Carlton
- Meadowvale Heights
- Mount Standfast
- Orange Hill, including Baywoods, Endeavour, Deanstown Terrace and Gilkes Village
- Oxnards, including Oxnards Heights and Oxnards Crescent
- Paynes Bay
- Porters
- Prior Park, including Prior Park Gardens, Prior Park Heights, Prior Park Crescent and Prior Park Close
- Prospect
- Ridgeway
- Rock Dundo, on the border to St. Lucy parish
- Sandy Lane
- Seaview
- Sion Hill
- Springhead
- St. Silas
- Sunset Crest
- Taitts
- The Garden
- Thorpes including Oakwood Park, Kings Village and Thorpes Terrace
- Trents
- Upper Carlton
- Wanstead, including Wanstead Gardens, Wanstead Heights and Wanstead Terrace
- Warrens Park North
- Warrens Crescent
- Warrens Heights
- Water Hall Terrace
- Westmoreland
- West Terrace, including West Terrace Gardens
- Weston

=== Parishes bordering Saint James ===
- Saint Andrew - East
- Saint Peter - North
- Saint Michael - South
- Saint Thomas - Southeast

=== Defined boundaries ===
- With St. Andrew: – Starting from the meeting point of the parishes of St. Peter, St. James and St. Andrew; then in a southerly direction along the line joining this point to the centre of the old millwall at Springhead Plantation; then in a straight line to a monument (B.5) at the acute bend in the public road at Gregg Farm: then in a southerly direction along this road to where it crosses the gully (monument (B.6) on the western side of the road): then along this gully to its junction with three other gullies. This is the meeting point of the parishes of St. James, St. Andrew and St. Thomas.
- With St. Peter: – Starting from the meeting point of the parishes of St. Peter, St. James and St. Andrew and continuing in an easterly direction to its junction with the public road leading from Rock Hall Plantation to Rock Hall Village: then in a north- westerly direction along this public road to its junction at Rock Hall Tenantry with a track leading to Roebuck Village; then along this track in a generally northerly direction to its junction at Roebuck Village with the unclassified public road leading from Four Hills Plantation to Indian Ground; then continuing in a generally northerly direction along this road to its junction with the public road leading from Orange Hill Plantation to Welchtown Plantation; then continuing in a northerly direction along this road to its junction at Welchtown Plantation with the public road leading from Farley Hill to Portland; then in a north-westerly direction along this road to its junction at Portland with the public road called Highway 1; then in an easterly and northerly direction along Highway 1 to the junction at Diamond Comer with the public road called Highway B; then in a generally easterly direction along Highway B passing through Nicholas and Cherry Tree Hill to the junction of this road with the public road leading to Boscobelle; then in a north-easterly direction along this road to the junction with the private road leading to Fosters Funland; then in a generally easterly direction along this road and along the southern section of the loop at the end; and then continuing in an easterly direction to the sea.
- With St. Michael: – Starting from the meeting point of the parishes of St. James, St. Thomas, and St. Michael and proceeding generally westwards along the public road called Clermont Road to its junction with the public road called Husbands Road; then in a southerly direction along this road to its junction with University Drive; then in a westerly and southerly direction along University Drive to the centre of the roundabout at the intersection of this road and Highway 1; then in a north-westerly direction along Highway 1 to a point just south of its junction with an unclassified road called Batt's Rock Road; then from this point in a straight line (bearing 263°07'21") through a monument (B. 18) to the sea.
- With St. Thomas: – Starting from the meeting point of the parishes of St. James, St. Andrew, and St. Thomas and proceeding along the gully in a south-westerly direction to the centre-line of the bridge at Lancaster where it crosses the public road known as Highway 2A; then in a generally southerly direction to its junction at St. Thomas’ Church with the public road leading from Seaview; then in a westerly direction along the public road to a point marked by a monument (B.8) placed on the southern side of the road; then in a southerly direction along a line joining this point to another monument (B.3) placed on the northern side of an unclassified road leading to Molyneux and to the centre line of the road; then in a westerly and southerly direction along this road to its junction with the public road leading from Bennetts Plantation to Sandy Lane; then in an easterly direction along this road to its junction at Bennetts with the public road called Highway 2A; then in a southerly direction along Highway 2A to its junction at Warrens with the public road called Clermont Road. This is the junction point of the parishes of St. James, St. Thomas, and St. Michael.

== Education ==
St. James is the home of five primary and two secondary schools. Secondary school are the Queen's College in Husbands and the Fredrick Smith Secondary School in Holetown.

Primary schools are in Fitts Village (Good Shepherd Primary), Orange Hill (St. Silas Primary), Trents (St. James Primary), West Terrace (West Terrace Primary) and Weston (St. Albans Primary).

== Politics ==
Saint James covers three geographical constituencies for the House of Assembly:

- St. James Central
- St. James North
- St. James South
