= Christ Church, Barbados =

Christ Church
- Parish
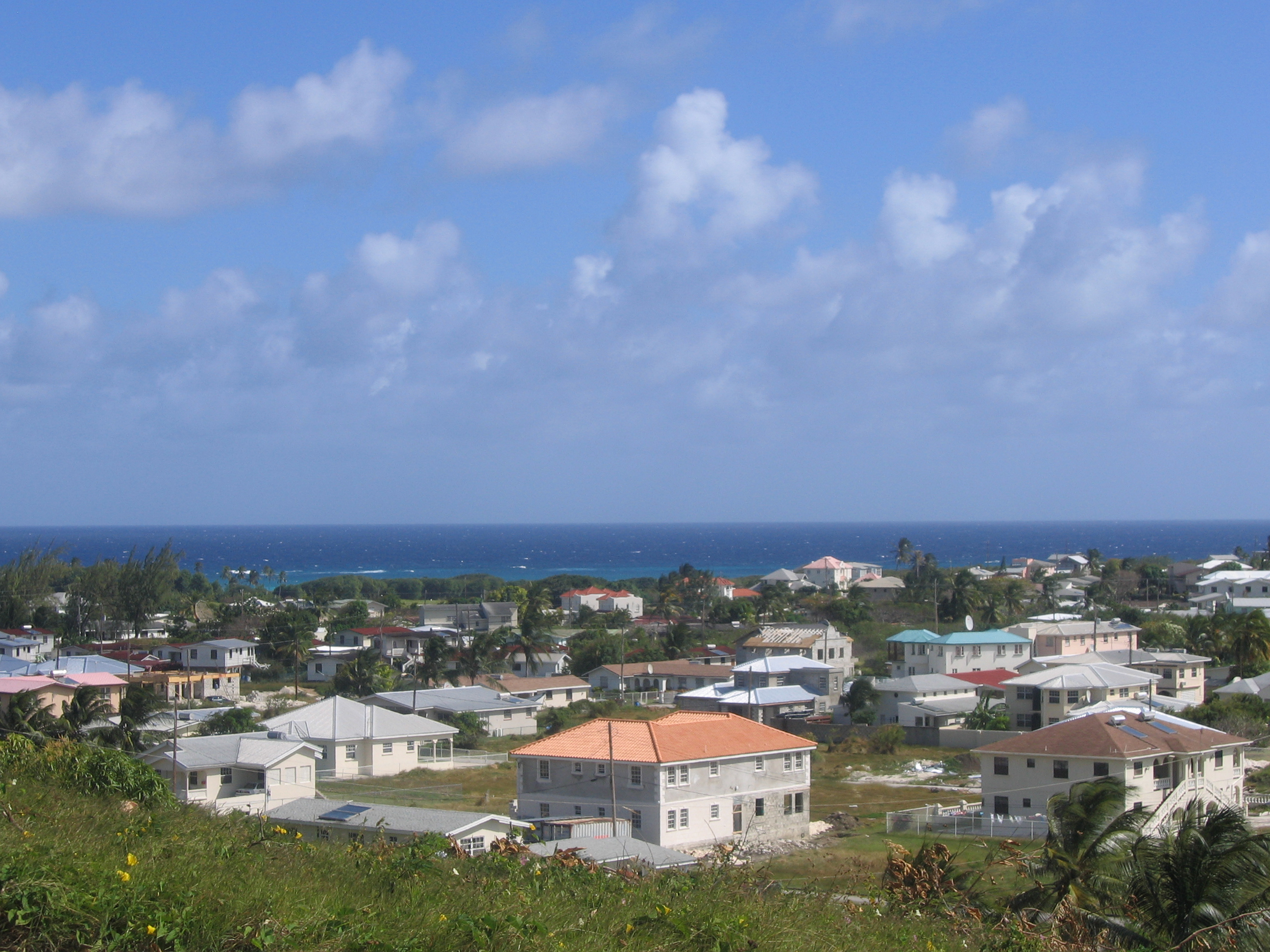
- View of Christ Church, 2008

- Map of Barbados showing Christ Church
- Coordinates: 13°05′N 59°32′W
- Country: Barbados
- First settlement: 1627
- Independence: November 30, 1966
- Largest city: Oistins
- House constituencies: 5: Christ Church-East; Christ Church-Centre East; Christ Church-Centre West; Christ Church-West; Christ Church-South

Government
  - Type: Parliamentary democracy
  - Parliamentary seats: 5

Area
  - Total: 57 km^{2} (22 sq mi)

Population (2010 census)
  - Total: 54,336
  - Density: 950/km^{2} (2,500/sq mi)
- Time zone: UTC-4 (Eastern Caribbean)
- Area code: +1 (246)
- ISO 3166 code: BB-01

The parish of Christ Church is one of eleven in Barbados. It has a land area of 57 km^{2} (22 sq mi) and is found at the southern end of the island. Christ Church has survived by name as one of the original six parishes created in 1629 by Governor Sir William Tufton.

The parish contains the Sir Grantley Adams International Airport as well as the last remaining mangrove swamp in the country, the Graeme Hall Nature Sanctuary. Under Barbados's historic vestry, the main parish church was originally seated near Dover. After it and the courtyard were destroyed by flood in 1669, the main parish church moved to Oistins area, becoming the main town and former capital of the parish. The South Point Lighthouse is located in South Point, Christ Church, between Atlantic Shores and Green Garden, also in Christ Church.

Another notable area of Christ Church is Saint Lawrence Gap, which is the most lively tourist area on the island. Many of the taverns and clubs in St. Lawrence are frequented by locals and tourists alike.

== Geography ==
=== Populated places ===
The parish contains the following towns, villages, localities, settlements, communities and hamlets:

- Aberdare
- Accra Beach
- Amity Lodge
- Atlantic Shores 13°02′57″N 59°31′57″W
- Balls 13°04′49″N 59°31′34″W
- Balls Plantation
- Bannatyne 13°05′19″N 59°32′41″W
- Bannatyne Gardens
- Bannatyne Main Road
- Bannatyne Road
- Bartletts 13°05′11″N 59°34′39″W
- Bartletts Tenantry Road
- Below Rock 13°03′31″N 59°31′50″W
- Blue Waters 13°04′35″N 59°35′17″W
- Boarded Hall 13°06′29″N 59°32′15″W
- Briggs 13°06′00″N 59°32′00″W
- Bright Hall
- Callenders (Callender) 13°04′15″N 59°31′48″W
- Callenders Court
- Callenders Crescent
- Cane Vale 13°04′03″N 59°32′43″W
- Carib Beach
- Carters Gap
- Cave Hill
- Chancery Lane 13°03′38″N 59°30′25″W
- Charnocks 13°04′56″N 59°29′37″W
- Church Hill
- Clapham 13°05′18″N 59°34′56″W
- Cotton House Bay
- Coverley 13°04′53″N 59°30′06″W
- Coverley Square
- Dayrells Road
- Dolphin Park
- Dover 13°04′06″N 59°33′55″W
- Dover Beach
- Dover Road
- Dover Terrace
- Durants 13°04′14″N 59°32′07″W
- Durants Heights
- Durants Road
- Durants Tenantry
- Durants Terrace
- Durants Village
- Ealing Grove 13°03′35″N 59°30′52″W
- Ealing Park 13°03′20″N 59°30′48″W
- Edey 13°05′56″N 59°32′24″W
- Edgerton
- Elizabeth Park 13°05′15″N 59°34′02″W
- Enterprise 13°03′14″N 59°31′48″W
- Enterprise Coast Road
- Enterprise Crescent
- Enterprise Gardens
- Enterprise Heights
- Enterprise Main Road
- Enterprise Road
- Enterprise 'A' Road
- Enterprise 'B' Road
- Enterprise Terrace
- Fairview 13°05′48″N 59°30′10″W
- Fairy Valley 13°04′45″N 59°30′21″W
- Fairy Valley Rock 13°04′05″N 59°30′07″W
- Frere Pilgrim 13°06′10″N 59°32′35″W
- Gall Hill 13°04′15″N 59°32′42″W
- Gibbons 13°04′03″N 59°31′09″W
- Gibbons Boggs 13°03′57″N 59°31′45″W
- Goodland 13°03′21″N 59°31′16″W
- Goodland Road
- Graeme Hall 13°04′34″N 59°34′17″W
- Graeme Hall Heights
- Graeme Hall Tenantry
- Graeme Hall Terrace
- Green Garden 13°02′50″N 59°31′14″W
- Hannays
- Hannays Tenantry 13°06′58″N 59°31′21″W
- Hannays Valley
- Harts Gap
- Hastings 13°04′30″N 59°35′52″W
- Hastings Beach
- Hastings Main Road
- Hastings Road
- Hastings Rocks
- Hopewell 13°03′28″N 59°31′06″W
- Inch Marlowe 13°03′06″N 59°30′47″W
- Inch Marlowe Point
- Keizer Hill 13°03′38″N 59°32′13″W
- Kendal Hill 13°04′34″N 59°33′31″W
- Kendal Point
- Kent 13°05′39″N 59°34′05″W
- Kingsland 13°04′45″N 59°32′57″W
- Kingsland Crescent
- Kingsland Gardens
- Kingsland Heights
- Kingsland Main Road
- Kingsland Road
- Kingsland Terrace
- Lead Vale 13°05′07″N 59°30′39″W
- Little Bay
- Lodge Road 13°04′36″N 59°32′18″W
- Lodge 'A' Road
- Lodge 'B' Road
- Long Beach
- Lowland 13°05′16″N 59°31′18″W
- Lowthers 13°05′40″N 59°29′50″W
- Lowthers Hill
- Marine Gardens 13°04′33″N 59°35′35″W
- Maxwell 13°04′19″N 59°33′16″W
- Maxwell Beach
- Maxwell Coast 13°04′02″N 59°33′26″W
- Maxwell Heights
- Maxwell Hill 13°04′23″N 59°33′39″W
- Maxwell Main Road
- Maxwell Terrace
- Miami Beach
- Montrose 13°04′22″N 59°32′46″W
- Mount Pegwell
- Navy Gardens 13°04′44″N 59°35′36″W
- Newton 13°04′53″N 59°32′12″W
- Newton Heights
- Newton Industrial Park
- Newton Park
- Newton Terrace 13°04′43″N 59°31′50″W
- Oistins 13°04′00″N 59°32′52″W
- Oistins Hill
- Packers 13°06′00″N 59°30′07″W
- Packers Valley
- Paragon 13°04′09″N 59°29′34″W
- Parish Land13°04′24″N 59°31′05″W
- Pegwell 13°03′48″N 59°32′03″W
- Pegwell Boggs
- Pilgrim
- Pilgrim Place 13°04′39″N 59°30′52″W
- Pilgrim Road 13°04′45″N 59°30′35″W
- Providence 13°04′34″N 59°31′16″W
- Regency Park 13°05′18″N 59°34′25″W
- Rendezvous 13°04′40″N 59°34′44″W
- Rendezvous Crescent
- Rendezvous Gardens
- Rendezvous Heights
- Rendezvous Hill
- Rendezvous Road
- Rendezvous Terrace
- Ridge 13°06′04″N 59°32′01″W
- Rising Sun
- Rockley 13°04′27″N 59°35′14″W
- Rockley Main Road
- Rockley New Road
- Rollins Road
- Round Rock 13°03′02″N 59°30′44″W
- Saint Christopher
- Saint Davids 13°05′42″N 59°33′37″W
- Saint Davids Village
- Saint Lawrence 13°04′11″N 59°34′27″W
- Saint Lawrence Gap
- Saint Lawrence Main Road
- Saint Matthias 13°04′42″N 59°36′02″W
- Sandy Beach
- Sargeants 13°05′04″N 59°34′16″W
- Sayes Court 13°03′31″N 59°31′35″W
- Scarborough 13°03′44″N 59°32′20″W
- Searles 13°05′29″N 59°30′10″W
- Searles Factory
- Searles Tenantry 13°05′24″N 59°31′02″W
- Seaview 13°03′52″N 59°30′09″W
- Seawell
- Sheraton
- Sheraton Heights
- Sheraton Park 13°05′00″N 59°33′44″W
- Silver Hill 13°04′33″N 59°33′00″W
- Silver Sands 13°03′01″N 59°31′02″W
- Silver Sands Beach
- Sion Hill 13°06′08″N 59°30′13″W
- Skeenes Hill 13°06′16″N 59°31′41″W
- Small Ridge
- South Point
- South Ridge
- Spencers
- St. Patricks 13°05′55″N 59°29′52″W
- Staple Grove 13°05′53″N 59°32′52″W
- Surfer's Point
- Thornbury Hill 13°04′02″N 59°31′52″W
- Top Rock 13°04′14″N 59°33′50″W
- Vauxhall 13°04′53″N 59°33′51″W
- Vauxhall Crescent
- Vauxhall Gardens
- Vauxhall Heights
- Vauxhall Tenantry
- Vauxhall Terrace
- Walls
- Walls Tenantry
- Walronds 13°05′43″N 59°29′31″W
- Walronds Village
- Warners 13°04′48″N 59°34′08″W
- Warners Heights
- Warners Terrace
- Water Street
- Welches 13°04′00″N 59°33′01″W
- Wilcox 13°04′03″N 59°30′31″W
- Wilcox Hill
- Woman's Bay
- Worthing 13°04′22″N 59°35′05″W
- Worthing Main Road
- Worthing View
- Wotton 13°04′38″N 59°32′43″W
- Wotton Heights
- Yorkshire

=== Parishes bordering Christ Church ===
- Saint George - North
- Saint Michael - West
- Saint Philip - East

=== Defined boundaries ===
- With St. George: – Starting from the meeting point of the parishes of St. George, St. Philip and Christ Church and proceeding in a generally westerly and south-westerly direction along Highway 5 to its junction at South District with the unclassified road leading to Edgerton and Staple Grove; then in a southerly direction along this road to its junction about 250 metres south of the entrance to Edgerton Plantation with a track; then in a westerly direction along this track for approximately 750 metres to its junction with another track; then in a northerly direction along this track for about 100 metres to the junction with another track, then in a westerly direction along this track for about 500 metres to its junction with another track; then along this track in a southerly direction for about 30 metres to its junction with another track; then for approximately 200 metres along this track to the junction with another track. This is the meeting point of the parishes of St. George, Christ Church and St. Michael. This point is marked by a monument.
- With St. Michael: – Starting from the meeting point of the parishes of St. George, St. Michael, and Christ Church and proceeding in a southerly direction along the plantation track and the boundary between the residential development called Fort George Heights and the Kent House residential development to the junction of the boundary with the public road called Highway R; then in a westerly direction along Highway R to its junction at Wildey with the Airport to West Coast Highway; then in a southerly direction along this Highway to its merging at Clapham with the public road called Highway 6; then in a north-westerly direction along Highway 6 to its junction with the public road called Observatory Road; then in a southerly direction along Observatory Road to its junction with the public road called Fordes Road, then in a south-westerly, north-westerly and northerly direction along Fordes Road, Bonnett's Road and Brittons New Road to its junction with Dalkeith Hill; then in a westerly direction along Dalkeith Hill to its junction with Deighton Road; then in a generally southerly direction along Deighton Road to its junction with Dayrells Road; then in a south-westerly, north-westerly and westerly direction along Dayrells Road to its junction at the Garrison with Dalkeith Road; then in a generally south-westerly direction along Dalkeith Road to its junction with the public road called Highway 7; then directly across Highway 7 and continuing in a south-westerly direction along the road leading to Gravesend Beach and directly to the sea.
- With St. Philip: – Starting from the meeting point of the parishes of St. George, St. Philip and Christ Church and proceeding in an easterly direction along Highway 5 to its junction at Brereton with an unclassified road; then in a southerly direction along this road to its junction with what was once the old railway line but is now an unclassified road; then in an easterly direction along this road to its junction at Carrington Sugar Factory with another unclassified road: then in a south-easterly and southerly direction to its junction with another unclassified road; then in an easterly direction along this road to its junction north of Woodboume Plantation yard with an unclassified road leading into the plantation yard; then in a southerly and south-easterly direction (through the plantation yard) along this road to its junction with the public road called Highway 6; then directly across Highway 6 to continue along the unclassified road in a generally south-easterly direction to merge into the public road at Walronds and then continue in a generally easterly direction along the unclassified road to its junction with the unclassified road leading to Hopefield Plantation; then in a southerly direction along this road (with an eastward diversion around the buildings) to its junction west of the Airport Radar Station with another unclassified road; then eastwards along this road to its junction, east of the Airport Radar Station, with another unclassified road; then in a southerly direction along this road to its junction at Spencers with the public road called Highway 7; then in an easterly and north-easterly direction along Highway 7 to its junction with a track to the west of Rock Hall Village; then in a south-easterly, easterly and southerly direction along this track to a point on the cliff edge to the east of the Airport boundary fence (monument B.17); then in a southerly direction to the sea.

== Government ==
The Barbados Civil Aviation Department has its head office on the property of Grantley Adams International Airport. The District A & C Court maintains a seat in Saint Matthias, and the District B Court in Oistins. The Barbados Police Service maintains posts located as Hastings, and Worthings; and the Barbados Postal Service at Oistins and Worthing.

=== Politics ===
Christ Church covers five geographical constituencies for the House of Assembly:

- Christ Church-East includes Fairy Valley and Providence.
- Christ Church-East Central includes Kingsland
- Christ Church-South includes St. Lawrence and Oistins
- Christ Church-West includes Rendezvous Hill
- Christ Church-West Central includes Sargeant's Village

== Economy ==
The head office of REDjet was located at Grantley Adams International Airport.

== Notable people ==
- Roston Chase, West Indian cricketer
- Shirley Chisholm, the first black woman elected to the United States House of Representatives, lived in Christ Church with her maternal grandmother for a large part of her childhood
- Sylvester Clarke, West Indian cricketer.
- Edward Cranfield, 17th Century English colonial official
- Doug E. Fresh, the famous beatboxer and rapper (prominent in the 1980s and '90s) was born here
- Joel Garner, West Indian cricketer
- Jefferson Jones, born in Christ Church before moving to England, where he played cricket for Berkshire
- Jaicko Lawrence, contemporary pop music singer/songwriter
- Ashley Nurse, West Indian cricketer
- Marita Payne-Wiggins, former track and field athlete and two-time Canadian Olympic silver medalist, spent her early childhood in Christ Church
- Hallam Cole, Barbadian cricketer.
- Collis King, Barbadian cricketer.
- Zane Maloney, Barbadian Motorsport driver, currently competing in FiA Formula 2.
- Maureen Bruce, Barbadian who became a youth leader recognized by Queen Elizabeth II with a British Empire Medal, she was born and raised in Christ Church and emigrated to England in 1967.
- Ramon Sealy, footballer and cricketer

== Transportation ==
=== Road ===
The primary roads in Christ Church to the rest of the island all originate in the Parish of St. Michael and include: the ABC Highway, H5, H6, and H7. There is also a number of public service vehicles which serve Christ Church.

=== Air ===
Barbados's primary airport, Grantley Adams International Airport, at Seawell.

=== Sea ===
The town of Oistins once housed a submarine and Coast Guard station. A jetty facility is also located for fisher-folk to unload seafood at the Oistins market and an offshore mooring is available for fuel delivery for the island.
