= Parishes of Barbados =

The country of Barbados is divided into sub-regions known as parishes.

== Terminology ==
They are legally styled as the "Parish of (parish name)" as opposed to the American naming convention with "Parish" coming after the name. The use of the term "parish" derives from the island's religious Anglican history under the Church of England.

== History ==
The system of parish churches was originally based on the system of the Church of England and was the visible expression forming the basis of the parliamentary representation in Barbados. The differing size and shape of each parish were primarily influenced by the large plantation estates of cotton, sugar cane and tobacco that existed during the colonial years of Barbados. As various chapels of ease were created during the 17th century across the island, some local churches were elevated to parish church status, leading to the formation of new parishes surrounding those freshly created vestries.

By 1629, the English settlers after landing at James Town formed six original parishes on the island which were:

- The Parish of Christ Church,
- The Parish of St. James,
- The Parish of St. Lucy,
- The Parish of St. Michael,
- The Parish of St. Peter, and
- The Parish of St. Thomas

By 1645, the land holding of Barbados increased and the shape of the original six was reconfigured giving way to an additional five parishes. Some prior churches of the state within the existing parishes were elevated to the level of parish church and as a consequence they formed new parishes around those new vestries:

- The Parish of St. Andrew,
- The Parish of St. George,
- The Parish of St. John,
- The Parish of St. Joseph, and
- The Parish of St. Philip.

Thus Barbados was converted into the current eleven parishes of today corresponding to the earlier church parishes. As was common under the British system, each parish had a single main parishional church (or cathedral in the case of Bridgetown having been elevated to city status), which acted as a sort of capital for each parish. The parishes each held their own local government councils until these were abolished in 1959, following a brief administrative districting experiment within Barbados until 1967.

== List ==

Within the country, travel is unrestricted to everyone in moving about from parish to parish. With increasing urban sprawl and new construction projects across the country many neighbourhoods and even parishional border-lines today are ill-defined.

The eleven parishes are:

Parishes of Barbados, with some details
Short name	Long name	Land area	Population (census 2010)	Density	Historic vestry
Christ Church	The Parish of Christ Church	57 km^{2} (22 sq mi)	54,336	953.3/km^{2}	Lead church of the parish
St. Andrew	The Parish of Saint Andrew	36 km^{2} (14 sq mi)	5,139	142.8/km^{2}	Lead church of the parish
St. George	The Parish of Saint George	44 km^{2} (17 sq mi)	19,767	449.3/km^{2}	
St. James	The Parish of Saint James	31 km^{2} (12 sq mi)	28,498	919.3/km^{2}	
St. John	The Parish of Saint John	34 km^{2} (13 sq mi)	8,963	263.6/km^{2}	Lead church of the parish
St. Joseph	The Parish of Saint Joseph	26 km^{2} (10 sq mi)	6,620	254.6/km^{2}	Lead church of the parish
St. Lucy	The Parish of Saint Lucy	36 km^{2} (14 sq mi)	9,758	271.1/km^{2}	
St. Michael	The Parish of Saint Michael	39 km^{2} (15 sq mi)	88,529	2,270.0/km^{2}	
St. Peter	The Parish of Saint Peter	34 km^{2} (13 sq mi)	11,300	332.4/km^{2}	Lead church of the parish
St. Philip	The Parish of Saint Philip	60 km^{2} (23 sq mi)	30,662	511.0/km^{2}	
St. Thomas	The Parish of Saint Thomas	34 km^{2} (13 sq mi)	14,249	419.1/km^{2}	

== See also ==
- Constituency Councils
- Geography of Barbados
- History of Barbados
- Transport in Barbados
  - Barbadian vehicle registration plates
- ISO 3166-2:BB
- List of cities in Barbados
- List of West Indian first-level country subdivisions
- List of Caribbean islands by area
- List of Caribbean islands by political affiliation
- List of Caribbean island countries by population
- List of metropolitan areas in the West Indies
