= List of beaches in Barbados =

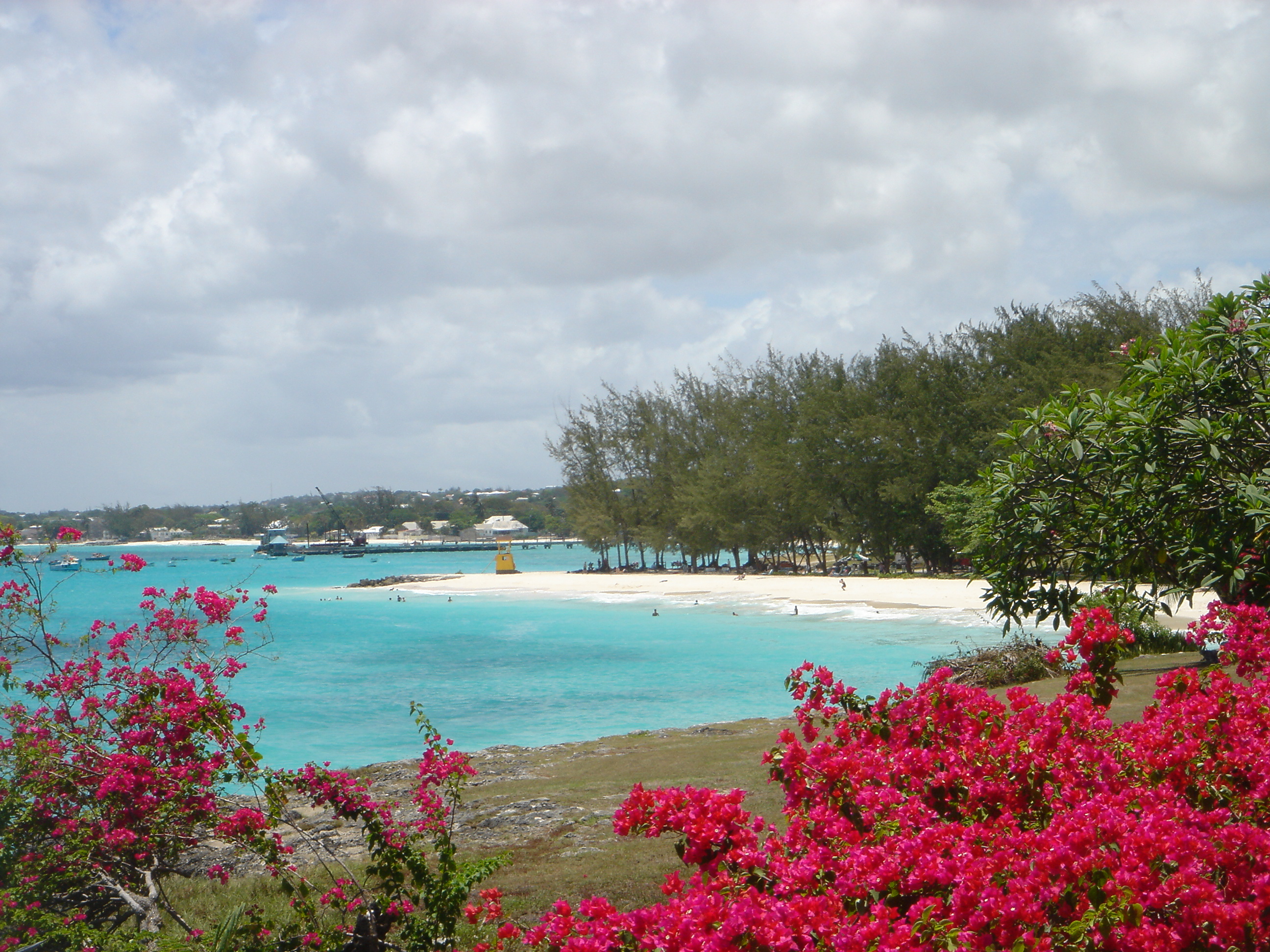
Miami Beach, Barbados

The island country of Barbados has more than 70 miles (110 km) of beaches of both pink and white sands, which are made of coral reefs that have been ground into a very fine powder by the waves of the ocean. Beaches on Barbados can be categorized by region: north and east coast beaches, south coast beaches, and west coast beaches. East and north coast beaches are facing the Atlantic Ocean, while the waters of the southern beaches are a combination of both the Atlantic Ocean and Caribbean Sea. The west coast, or the Platinum Coast, beaches are brimmed by the warm waters of the Caribbean. This is a list of many of the beaches located in Barbados. There are no private beaches on the island.

== Beaches ==

There are 61 beaches in Barbados, including the following with the parishes indicated for each beach:

Selected beaches in Barbados
Beach	Parish	Coor/Refs
Accra Beach	Christ Church	13°04′00″N 59°33′42″W
Alleyne Beach	Saint James	13°12′24″N 59°38′29″W
Barclays Park Beach	Saint Joseph	13°14′11″N 59°32′36″W
Bathsheba Beach	Saint Joseph	13°12′52″N 59°31′23″W
Bath Beach	Saint John	13°11′15″N 59°28′36″W
Batts Rock	Saint Miachael	13°08′07″N 59°38′11″W
Bottom Bay beach	Saint Philip	13°08′10″N 59°25′28″W
Brandons Beach	Saint Michael	13°06′57″N 59°37′38″W
Brighton Beach	Saint Michael	13°07′20″N 59°37′52″W
Brownes Beach	Saint Michael	13°05′10″N 59°36′35″W
Carlisle Bay	Saint Michael	13°05′N 59°37′W
Care Bay	Saint Philip	
Casuarina Beach	Christ Church	
Cattlewash	Saint Joseph	13°13′21″N 59°31′55″W
The Chase Beach	Saint Andrew	13°16′28″N 59°34′00″W
Cotton House Bay	Christ Church	
Crane Beach	Saint Philip	13°06′24″N 59°26′38″W
Culpepper Island	Saint Philip	13°09′58″N 59°26′36″W
Dover Beach	Christ Church	13°04′00″N 59°34′10″W
Drill Haul Beach	Saint Michael	13°04′40″N 59°36′31″W
Fitts Village	Saint James	
Foul Bay Beach	Saint Philip	13°06′04″N 59°27′03″W
Freights Beach	Christ Church	13°03′12″N 59°32′14″W
Freshwater Bay	Saint Michael	13°07′50″N 59°38′09″W
Garrison Beach	Christ Church	
Gibbes Beach	Saint Peter	13°13′54″N 59°38′35″W
Ginger Bay (aka Shanty Bay)	Saint Philip	13°06′42″N 59°26′28″W
Heywoods Beach	Saint Peter	13°15′25″N 59°38′39″W
Inch Marlow Beach	Christ Church	
Lakes Beach	Saint Andrew	13°14′21″N 59°32′43″W
Little Bay	Saint Lucy	13°18′36″N 59°34′44″W
Long Bay Beach	Christ Church	13°03′46″N 59°29′52″W
Maycock's Bay	Saint Lucy	13°17′45″N 59°39′00″W
Maxwell Beach	Christ Church	13°04′00″N 59°33′00″W
Miami Beach (aka Enterprise Beach)	Christ Church	13°3′35″N 59°32′23″W
Morgan Lewis Beach	Saint Andrew	13°16′10″N 59°33′51″W
Mullins Beach	Saint Peter	13°14′04″N 59°38′34″W
Needham Point Beach	Saint Michael	13°04′42″N 59°36′42″W
Paradise Beach	Saint Michael	13°07′49″N 59°38′05″W
Paynes Bay	Saint Thomas	13°10′N 59°38′W
Pebbles Beach	Saint Michael	13°05′14″N 59°36′35″W
River Bay	Saint Lucy	13°19′24″N 59°35′44″W
Rockley Beach	Christ Church	13°04′25″N 59°35′21″W
Saint Lawrence Gap	Christ Church	
Sam Lord's Castle	Saint Philip	
Sandy Lane Bay	Saint James	13°10′27″N 59°38′16″W
Shark's Hole Bay	Saint Philip	13°07′13″N 59°26′01″W
Silver Rock Beach-Round Rock	Christ Church	
Silver Sands Beach	Christ Church	13°02′50″N 59°31′03″W
Walkers Beach	Saint Andrew	13°15′25″N 59°33′27″W
Welches Beach	Christ Church	13°03′55″N 59°32′55″W
Worthing Beach (aka Sandy Beach)	Christ Church	13°04′16″N 59°34′59″W

== Gallery ==
Beach scenes in Barbados
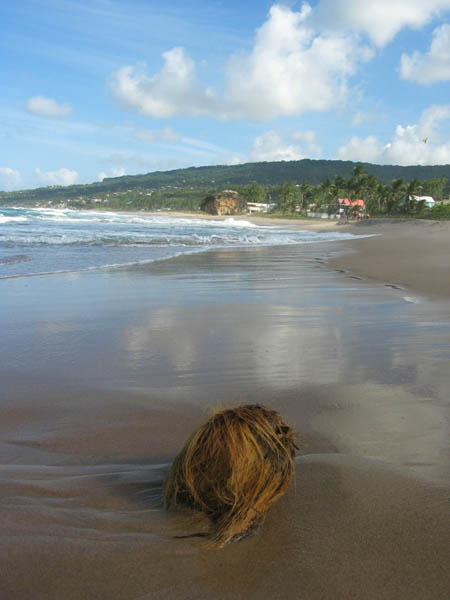
Bathsheba Beach

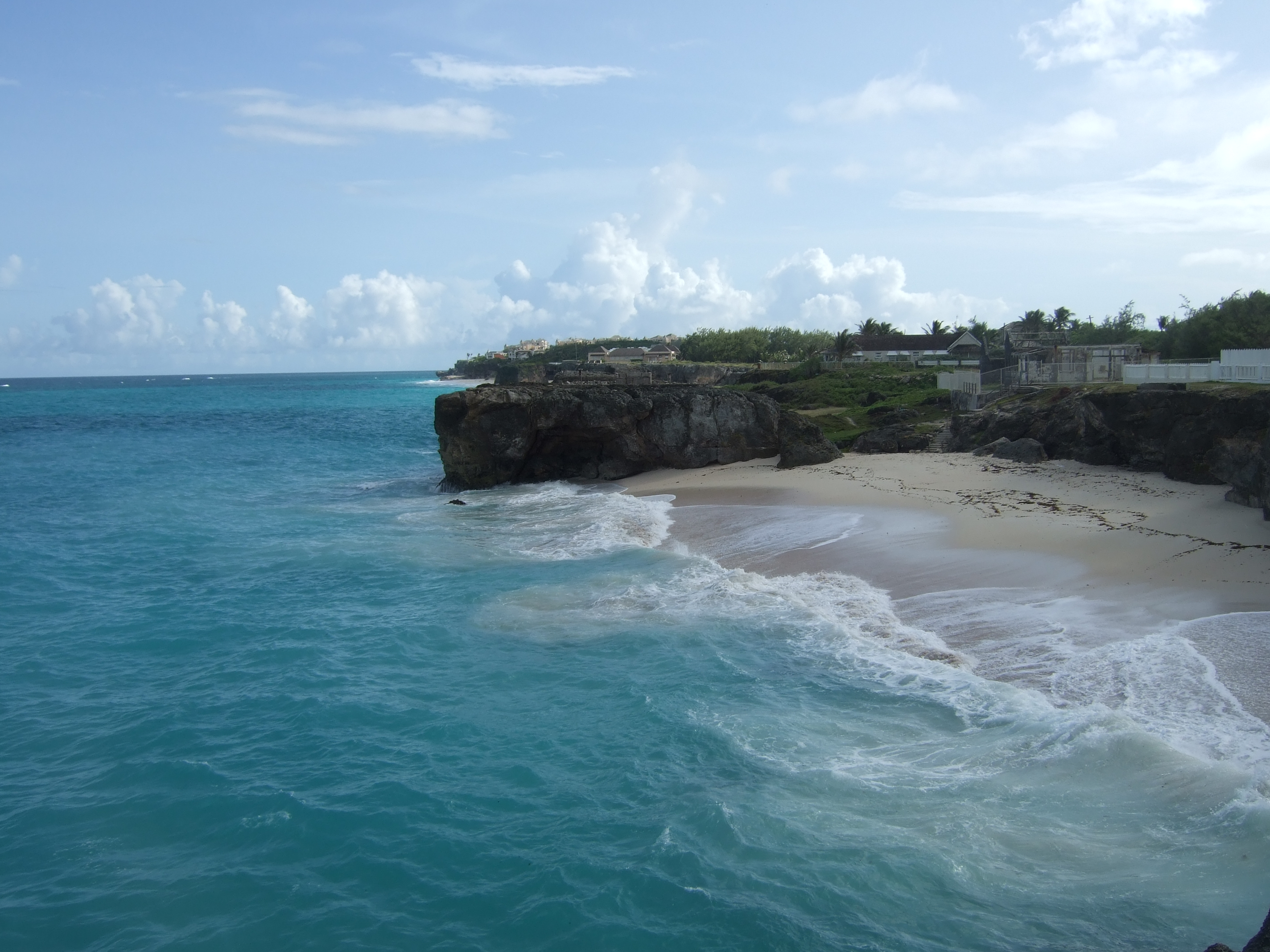
Bel Air Beach

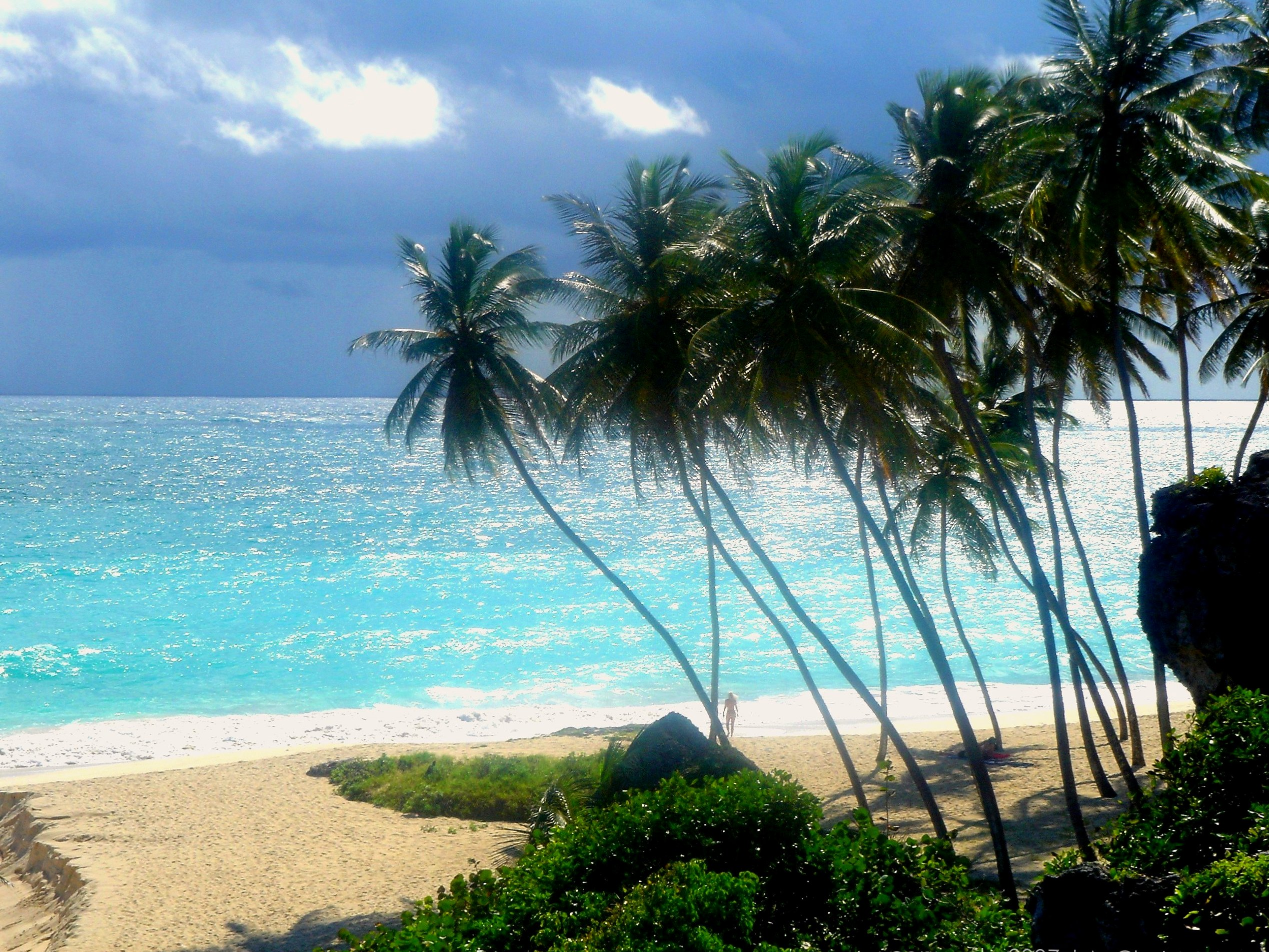
Bottom Bay

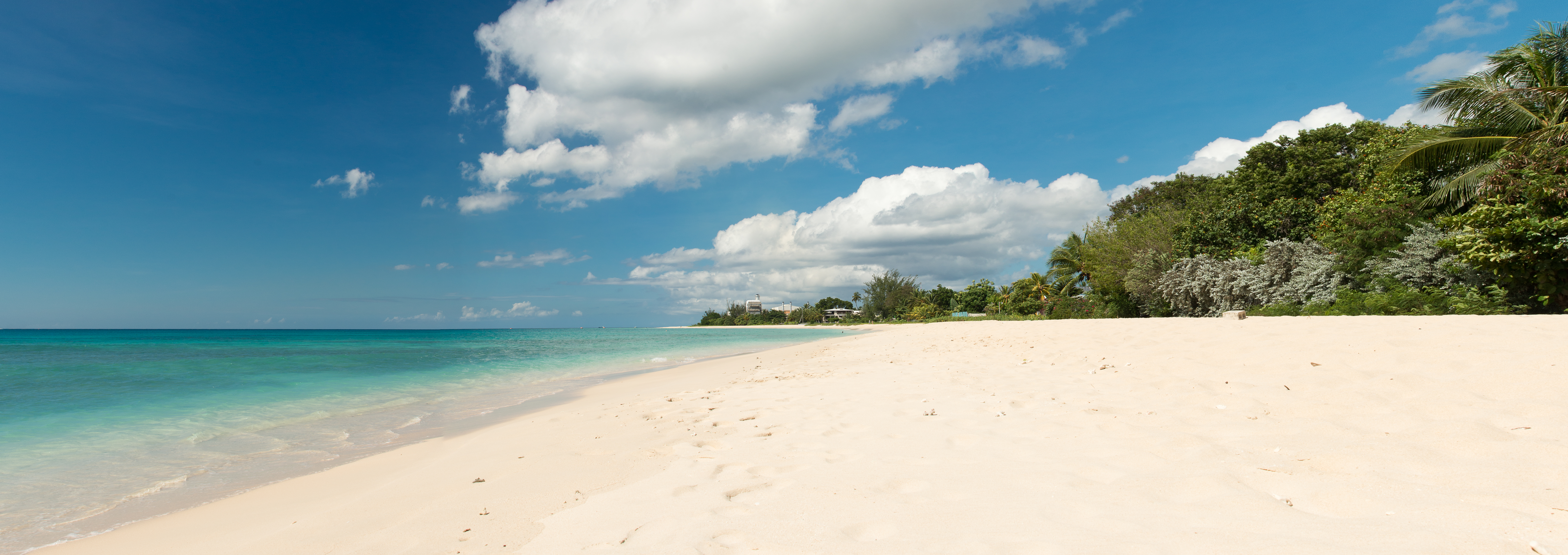
Brandon's Beach

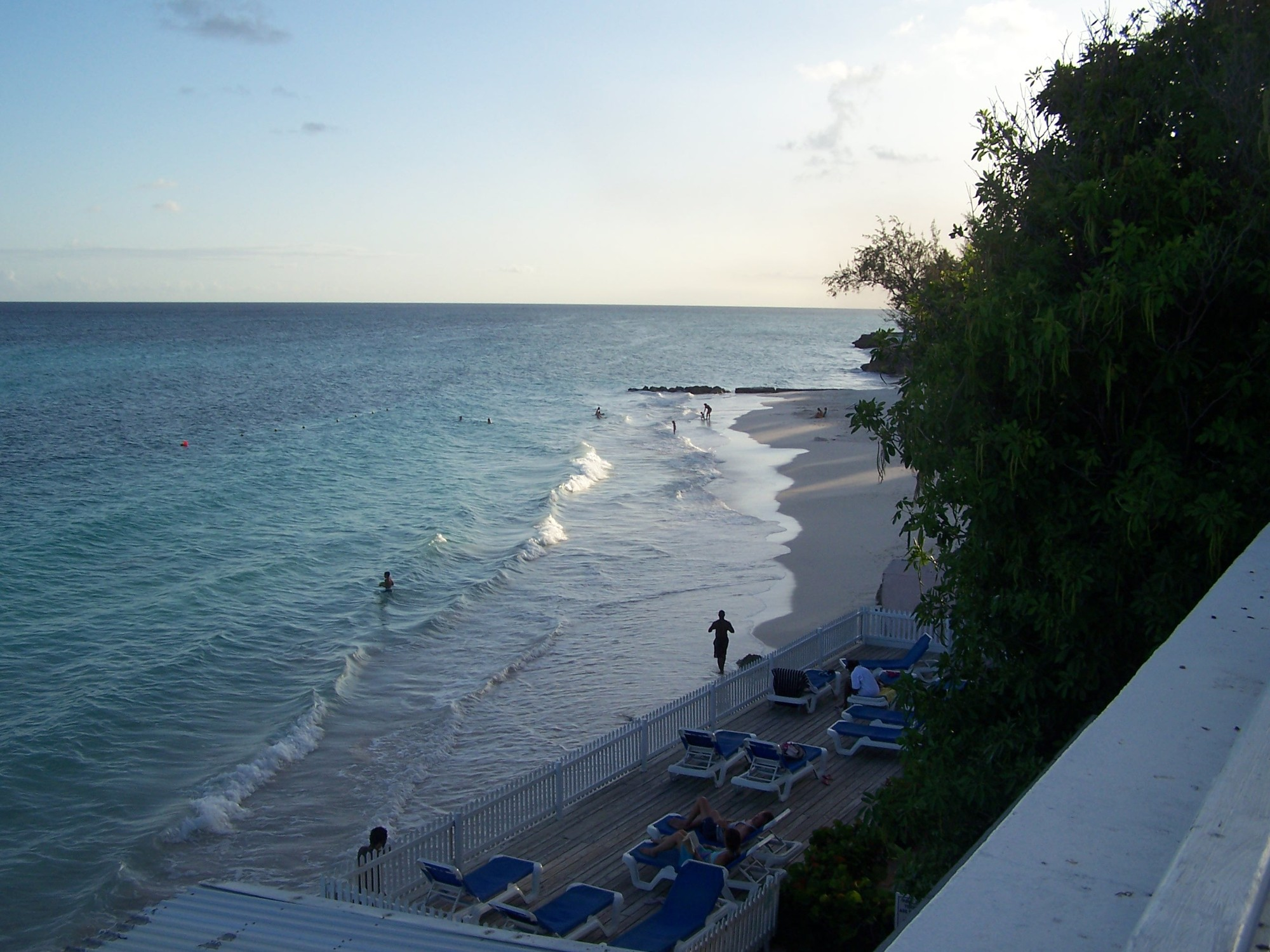
Butterfly Beach

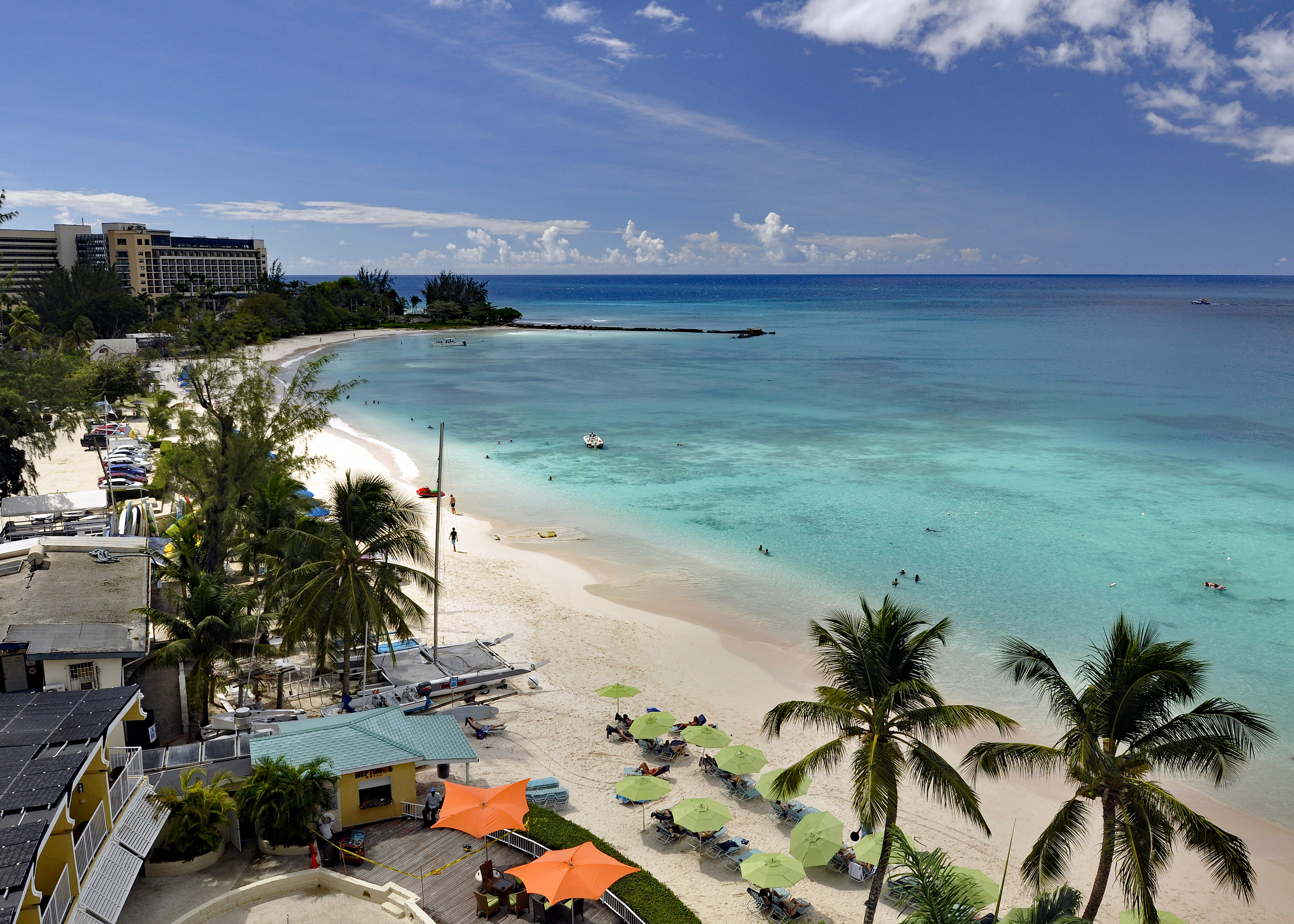
Carllisle Bay

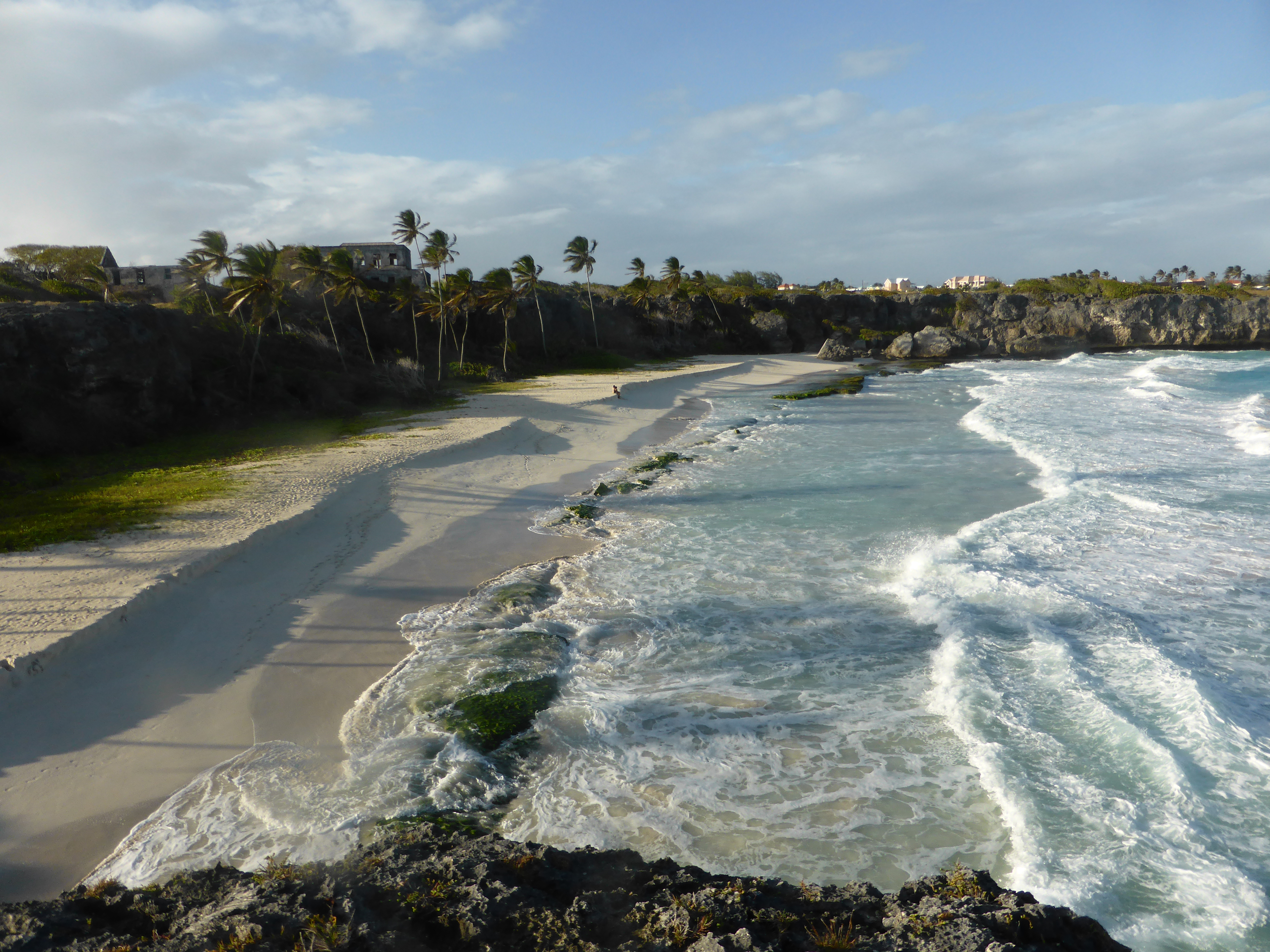
Cave Bay

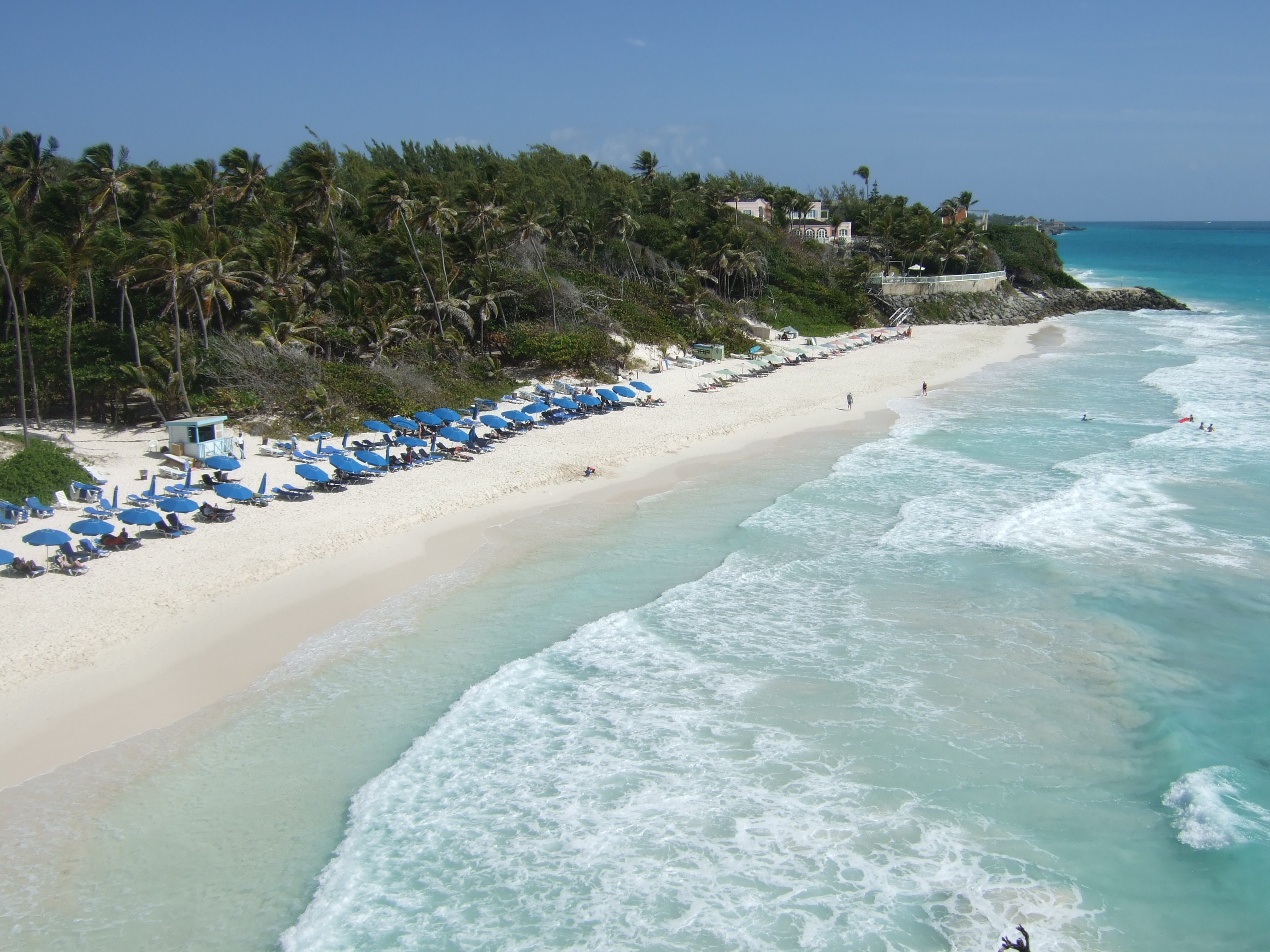
Crane Beach

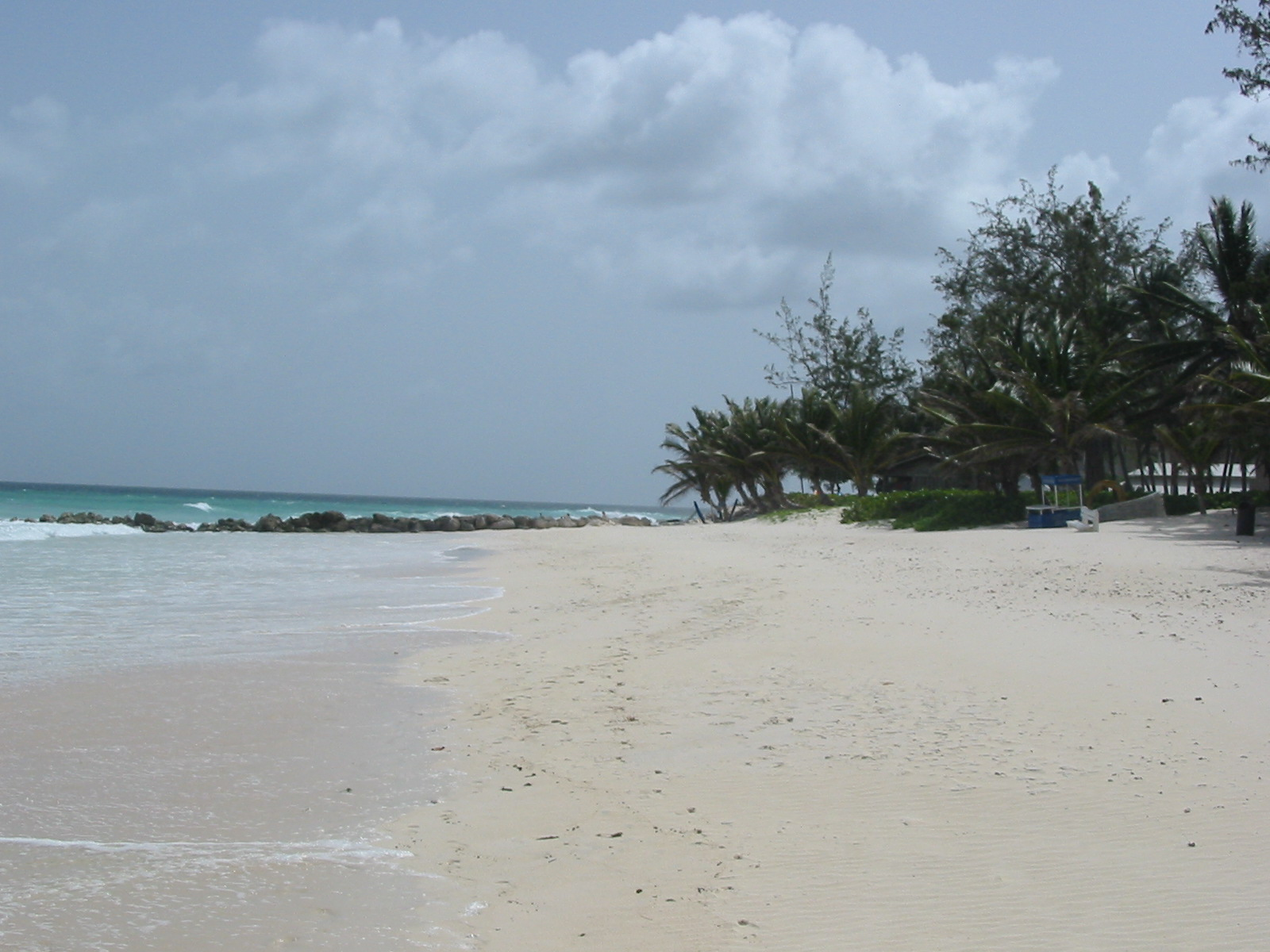
Dovere Beach

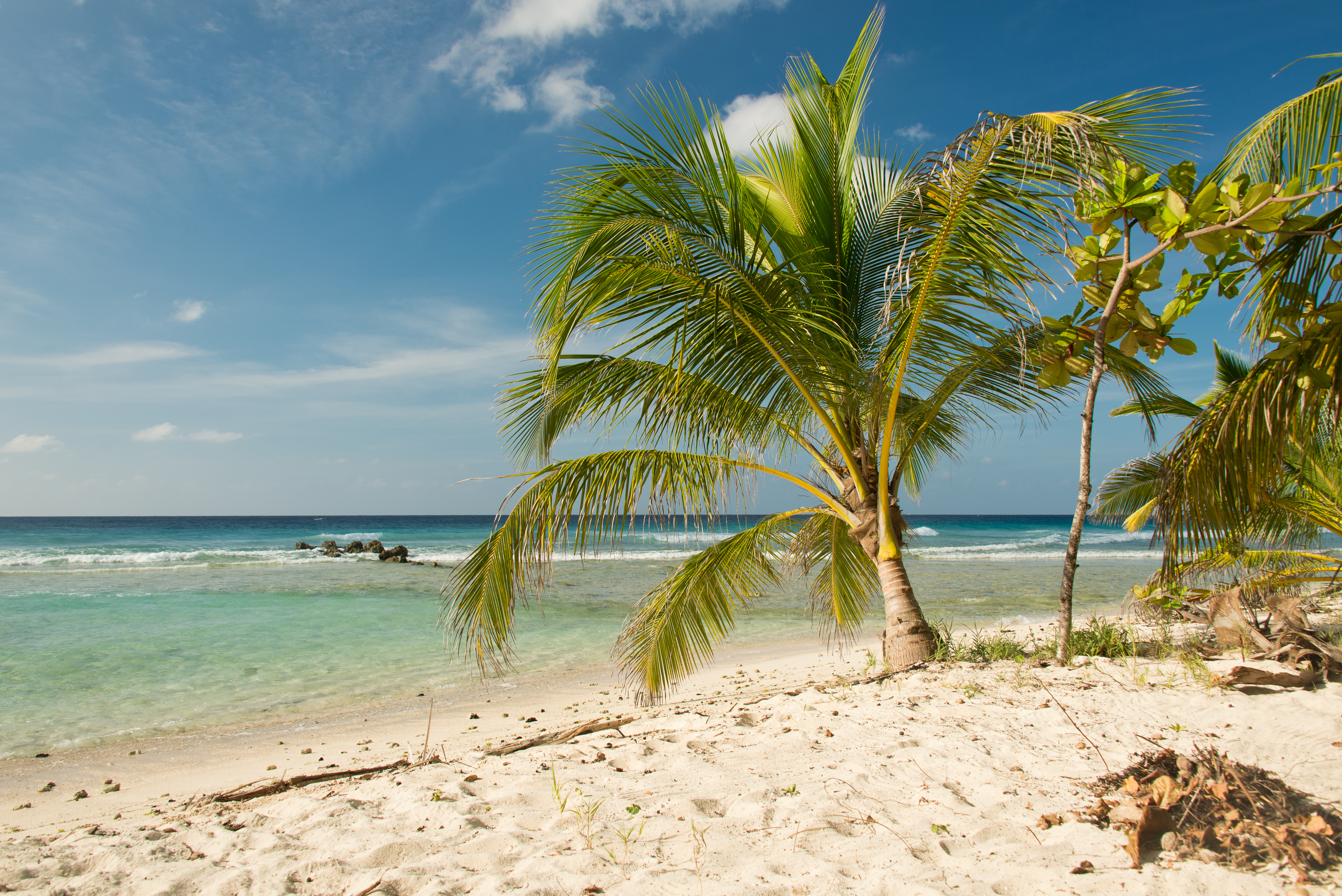
Drill Hall Beach

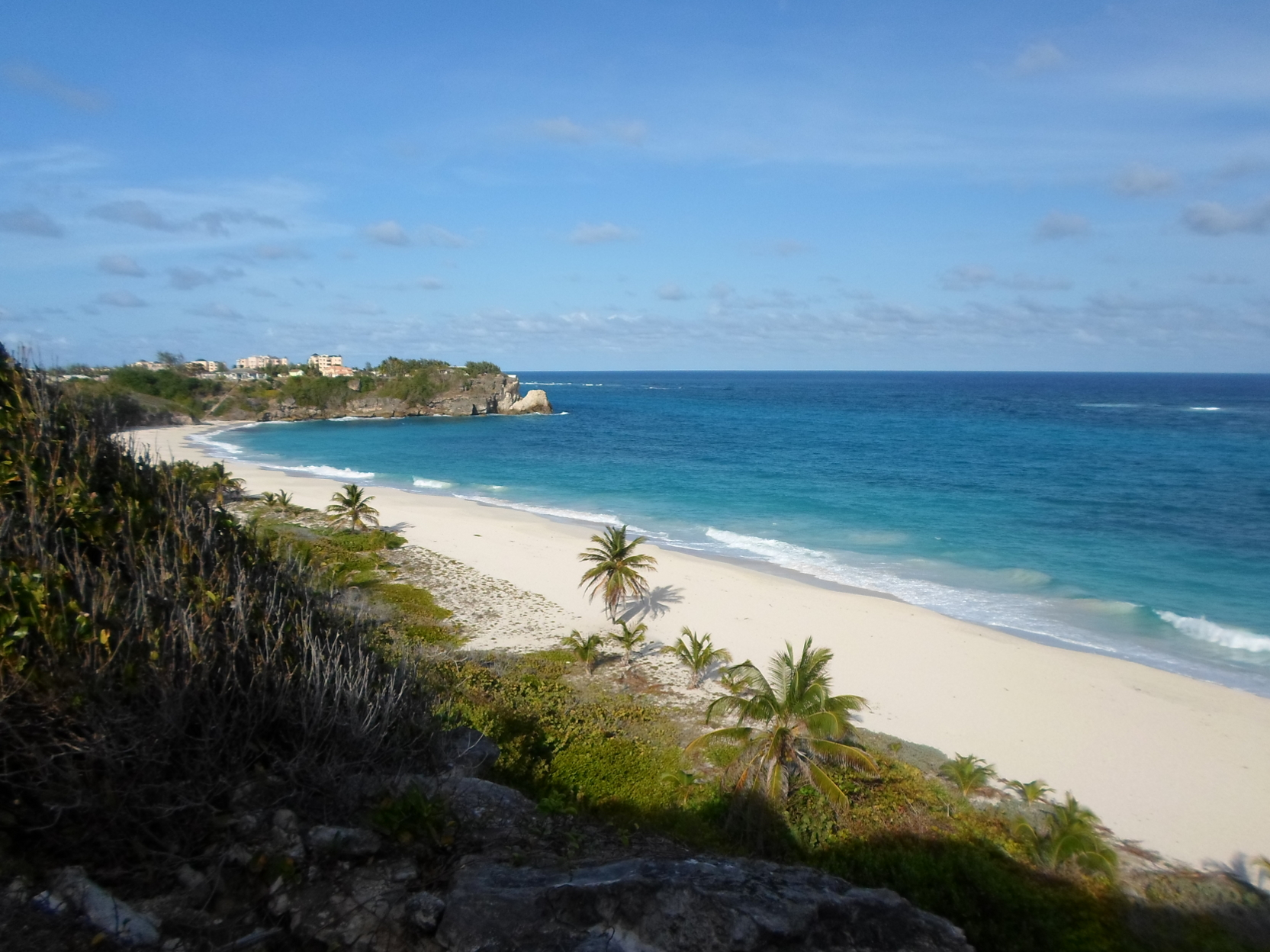
Foul Bay

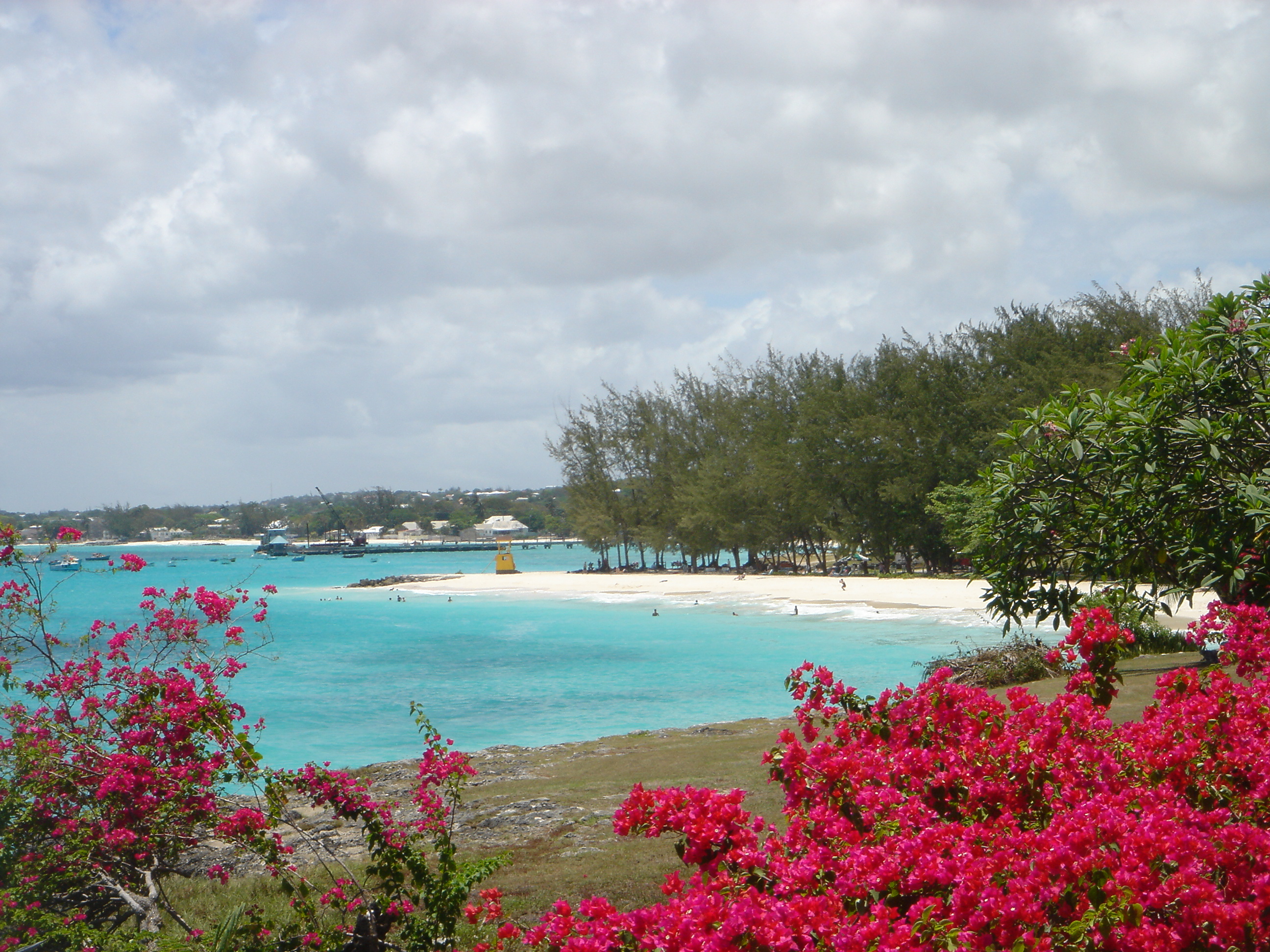
Miami Beach

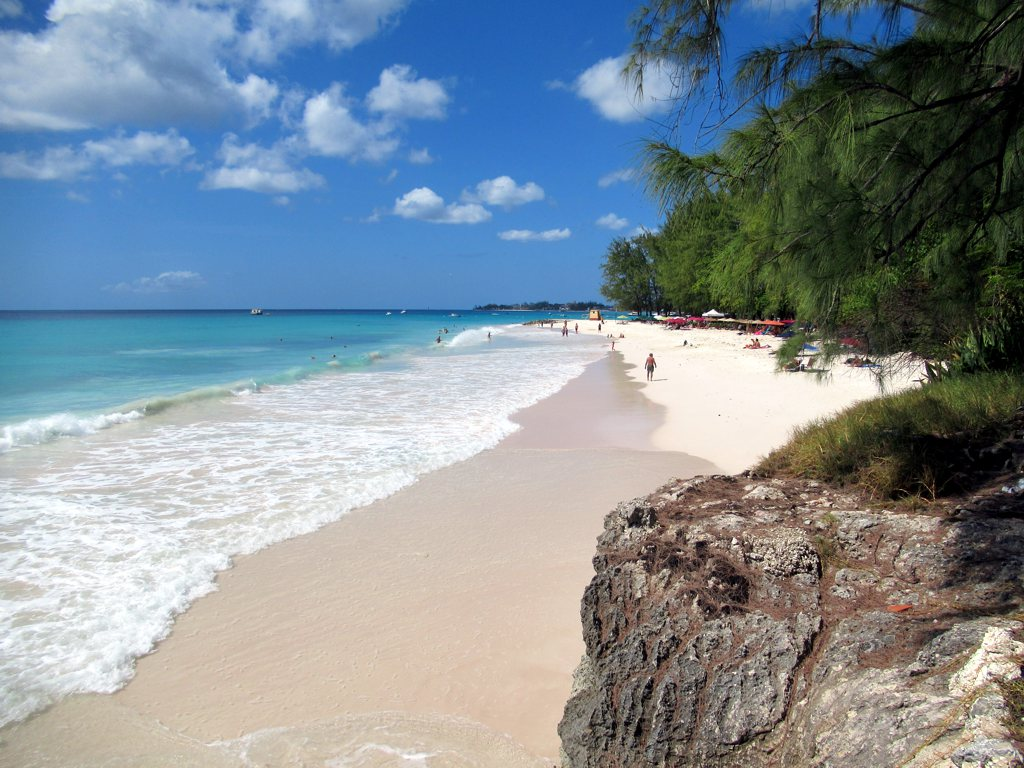
Moamo Beach

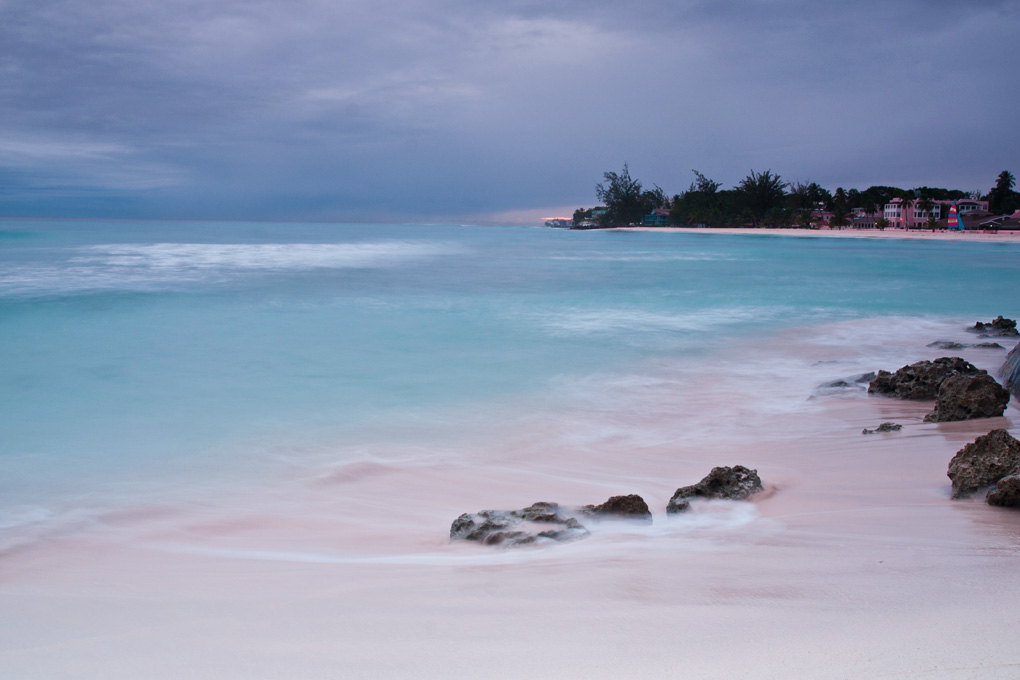
Moody Beach

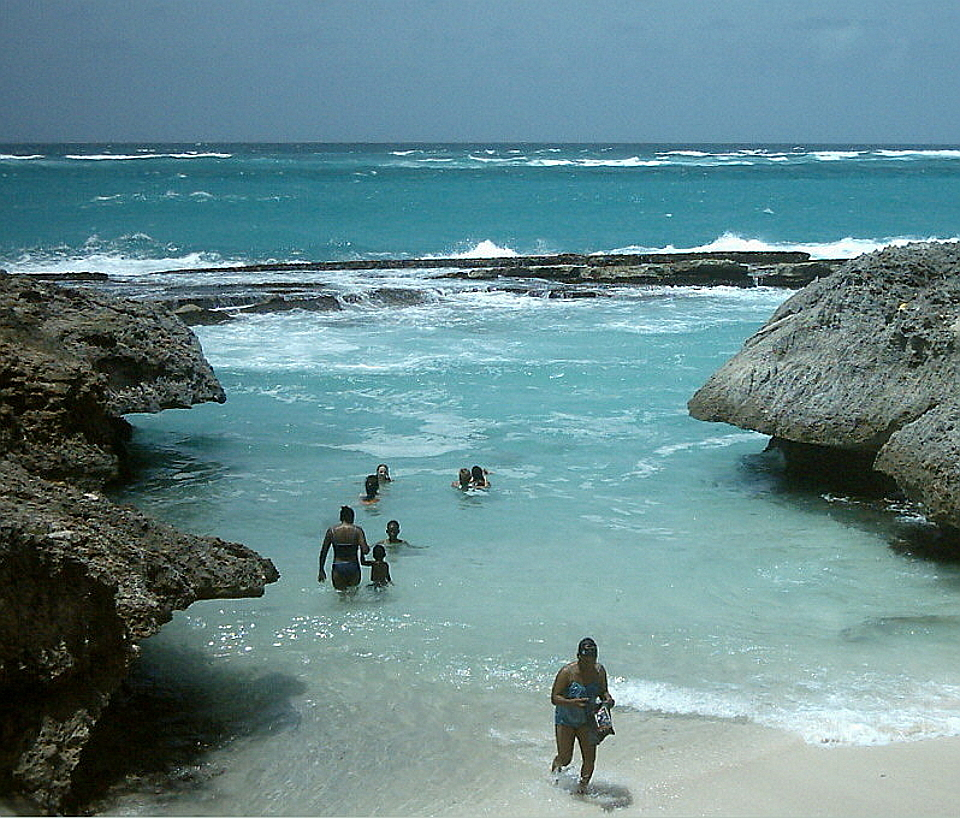
Shark's Hole Beach

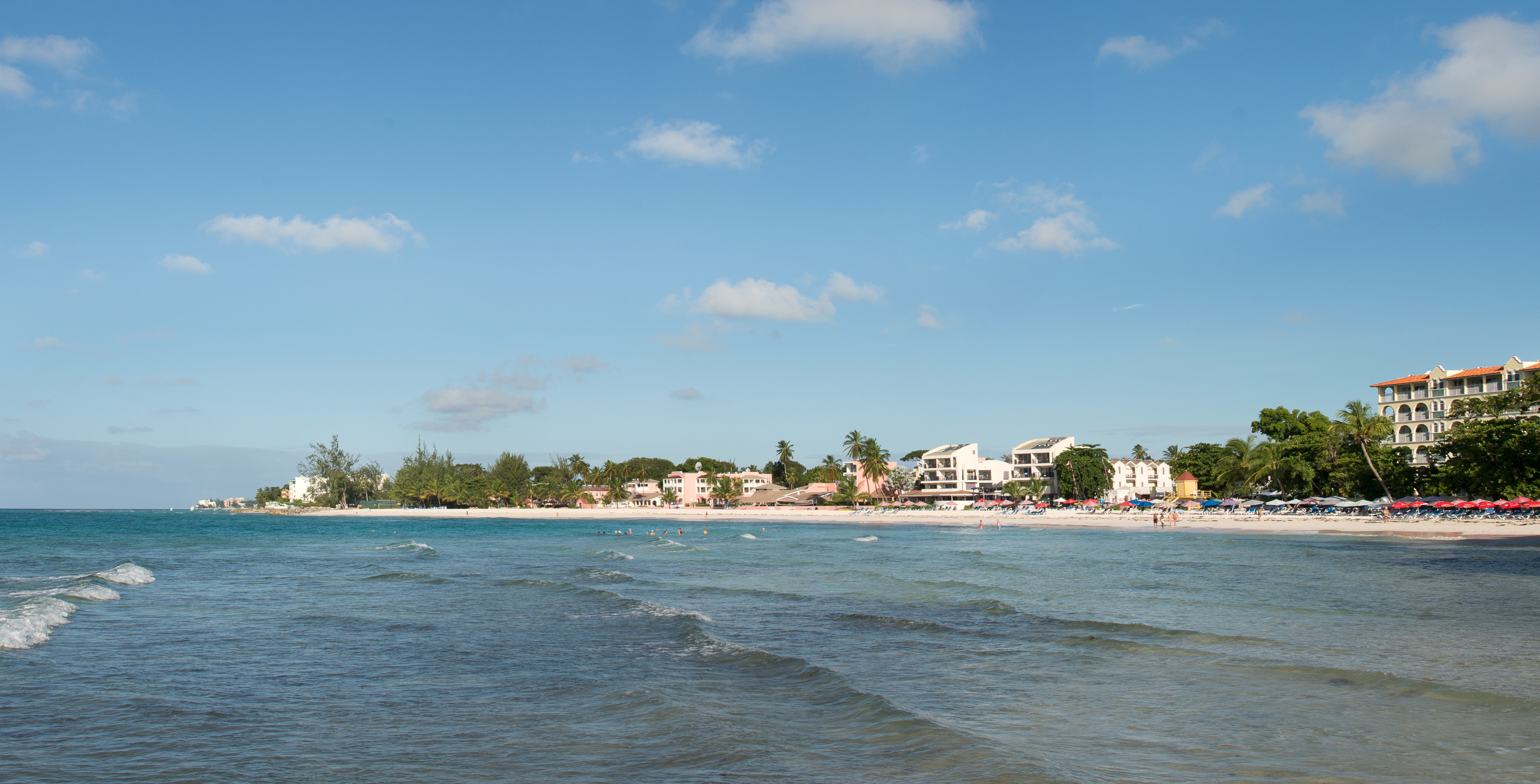
Worthing Beach

== See also ==
- Tourism of Barbados
- Geography of Barbados
- World beaches
