= Rudi Webster =

Barbadian cricketer, doctor, sports psychologist and diplomat

Personal information
- Full name: Rudi Valentine Webster
- Born: 10 June 1939 (age 87); Marchfield, Saint Philip, Barbados
- Batting: Right-handed
- Bowling: Right-arm fast-medium
- Role: Opening bowler

Domestic team information
- Years: Team
- 1961–1964: Scotland
- 1962–1966: Warwickshire
- 1966/67–1967/68: Otago

Career statistics
Competition	First-class	List A
Matches	70	7
Runs scored	867	22
Batting average	13.76	7.33
100s/50s	0/0	0/0
Top score	47	11
Balls bowled	12,383	420
Wickets	272	5
Bowling average	19.44	45.00
5 wickets in innings	13	0
10 wickets in match	4	0
Best bowling	8/19	2/26
Catches/stumpings	21/–	1/–
- Source: Cricinfo, 11 December 2019

Rudi Valentine Webster (born 10 June 1939) is a Barbadian medical doctor, sports psychologist and diplomat. He played first-class cricket for teams in the United Kingdom and New Zealand between 1961 and 1968.

== Cricket career ==
Webster was born at Marchfield, Saint Philip, Barbados and attended Harrison College in Bridgetown. Between 1961 and 1968 he appeared in 70 first-class matches as a right-handed batsman and right-arm fast-medium bowler, representing Scotland, Warwickshire and Otago. He played his first first-class match for Scotland in 1961, while studying medicine at the University of Edinburgh. Playing against the Marylebone Cricket Club, he took 11 wickets in the match, including a wicket with the first ball he bowled in each innings.

In 1963, playing for Warwickshire after his medical studies finished for the year, Webster took 77 wickets in 17 matches in the County Championship at an average of 17.44, forming the fieriest opening attack in the competition with another student, Roger Edmonds. In his first Championship match in 1964, after completing his medical studies, he took 7 for 6 and 5 for 52 in Warwickshire's victory over Yorkshire.

In late 1966 Webster moved to New Zealand, taking up a two-year appointment in the radiology department at Dunedin Hospital. He played two seasons of Plunket Shield cricket for Otago, taking 23 wickets in seven first-class matches at an average of 24.00. He played no further first-class cricket.

== Later career ==
Webster managed the West Indian team that played World Series Cricket between 1977 and 1979. From the late 1970s to the mid-1980s he was a successful team motivator with the premiership teams Carlton and Richmond in the Victorian Football League. He later worked with international cricket teams as a sports psychologist. He has written two books on the subject: Winning Ways: In Search of Your Best Performance (1985) and Think Like a Champion (2013).

He served as Barbados's Ambassador to the United States from 1991 to 1995.

In March 2012, the Indian Premier League franchise Kolkata Knight Riders appointed Webster as their mental skills coach for the fifth season of the IPL. They won the tournament.
