= Hubert Hutchinson =

Hubert John Hutchinson was the Dean of Barbados from 1945 until 1950.

He was educated at Codrington College and ordained in 1916. After curacies at Saint Peter, Barbados and St George Grenada he was Vicar at Saint Philip, Barbados from 1920 to 1923. He was at Northam, Devon from 1923 to 1925 and then SPG Secretary for the Diocese of St Edmundsbury and Ipswich until 1928. He was the Chaplain at Malacca from 1928 to 1931 and of South Perak until 1934. He was Vicar of Saint Martins, Barbados from 1934 until his appointment as Dean; and Archdeacon of Barbados afterwards.
