= Barbados rail =

Barbados rail Temporal range: Late Pleistocene

Scientific classification
- Kingdom: Animalia
- Phylum: Chordata
- Class: Aves
- Order: Gruiformes
- Family: Rallidae
- Genus: Fulica
- Species: †F. podagrica

Binomial name
- †Fulica podagrica (Brodkorb, 1965)

Extinct species of bird

The Barbados rail is a fossil rail species endemic to Barbados with an undetermined taxonomic status. It was formerly described by Pierce Brodkorb in 1965 as Fulica podagrica. However, this classification has been questioned by Storrs Olson when he described Brodkorb's material anew in 1974. It is only known by Brodkorb's holotype which consists of a humerus and several leg elements including femur, tibiotarsus and tarsometatarsus fragments. The humerus may not be specifically distinct from those of the American coot (Fulica americana) but most of the femur, tibiotarsus and tarsometarsus fragments are from a yet undescribed larger rail of an undetermined genus not related to Fulica. Olson further assumed that Brodkorb's material might be a composite of several rail species. The bone fragments were unearthed in Late Pleistocene deposits in Saint Philip Parish and Ragged Point on Barbados.

== Etymology ==
Brodkorb's previous species epithet is derived from the Greek term podagrikos (which means affected with gout). This applied in allusion to the large size of the leg elements.
