= Brereton, Barbados =

Coordinates: 13°07′N 59°30′W

Brereton is a village in Saint Philip Parish in Barbados. Brereton is named for John Brereton, who traveled to Barbados in 1654.

Brereton is situated nearby to Bentleys, which is in Christ Church Parish, and to the west of Six Cross Roads. It is also 15 minutes' drive from Grantley Adams International Airport.

Sites of public interest in and immediately around the village include the Sunbury Plantation Great House, Foursquare Rum Brewery, the Hunterspring live music venue, and several bars.
