= Bottom Bay =

Waterbody on the coast of Barbados

Coordinates: 13°8.184′N 59°25.482′W

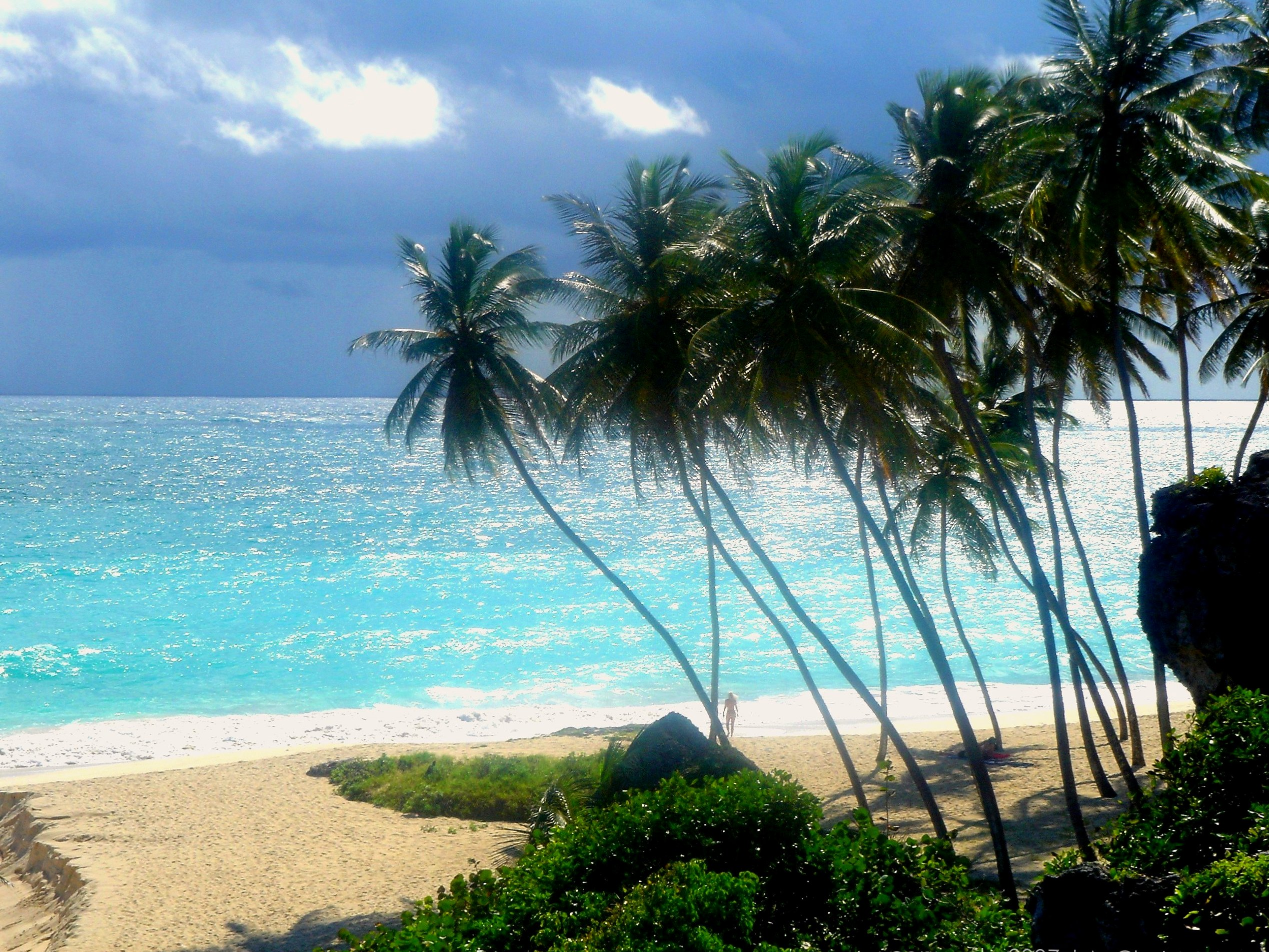

Bottom Bay is a bay located in Saint Philip, Barbados, with Palmetto Bay to the north, and Cave Bay, Crane Beach and Sam Lord's Castle to the south.
