= Marchfield =

Marchfield may refer to:

- Marchfield (assembly), early medieval institution among the Franks and Lombards
- Marchfield, Barbados, a village in Saint Philip Parish
- Marchfield (horse), winner of the Breeders' Stakes (2007)
