= List of lighthouses in Barbados =

This is a list of lighthouses in Barbados. They are located close to important ports of Barbados and the eastern coast to guide ships from across the Atlantic to the relatively flat island.

== Lighthouses ==
Name	Image	Year built	Location & coordinates	Class of Light	Tower height	Admiralty number	ARLHS number	Range nml
Bridgetown Breakwater Lighthouse		n/a	Bridgetown; 13°06′24.0″N 59°37′58.5″W	Q (3) R 10s.	10 metres (33 ft)	J5811		12
Bridgetown Entrance Range Rear Lighthouse		n/a	Bridgetown; 13°06′31.8″N 59°37′40.4″E	Iso G 2s.	n/a	J5812.54		
Bridgetown Entrance Range Rear Lighthouse	Image	n/a	Bridgetown; 13°06′32.0″N 59°37′34.3″W	Oc G 4.5s.	n/a	J5812.56		
Harrison Point Lighthouse		1925	Saint Lucy; 13°18′30″N 59°38′54″W	F R	26 metres (85 ft)	J5814	BAR-001	3
Needham's Point Lighthouse		1855	Carlisle Bay; 13°04.716′N 59°36.658′W	Fl R 8s.	13 metres (43 ft)	J5807	BAR-002	3
Ragged Point Lighthouse		1875	East Point; 13°09′49.2″N 59°25′58.6″W	F R	29.5 metres (97 ft)	J5804	BAR-003	3
South Point Lighthouse		1852	South Point; 13°02.826′N 59°31.765′W	Fl (3) W 30s.	27 metres (89 ft)	J5806	BAR-004	17

== Notes and references ==
- This article draws heavily on the corresponding article in the Spanish-language Wikipedia, which was accessed in the version of 10/2012.

== See also ==
- Transport in Barbados
- Lists of lighthouses and lightvessels
