= Oistins Bay =

Town in Barbados

Coordinates: 13°03′N 59°33′W

Oistins Bay is a hamlet located southeast of Carlisle Bay, close to the southernmost point of Barbados, South Point.
