= Blades Hill =

Village in Barbados

Coordinates: 13°09′N 59°27′W

Blades Hill is a village in Saint Philip Parish in Barbados.
