= Three Houses, Barbados =

Village in Barbados

Three Houses
- Village
- Interactive map of Three Houses
- Coordinates: 13.1594°N 59.4555°W
- Country: Barbados
- Parish: Saint Philip

Three Houses is a small village in Saint Philip Parish in Barbados.

In October 2024, sewage was detected in the well water.

Despite its name, it actually has more than three houses.
