= Samuel Hall Lord =

Barbadian pirate (1778–1844)

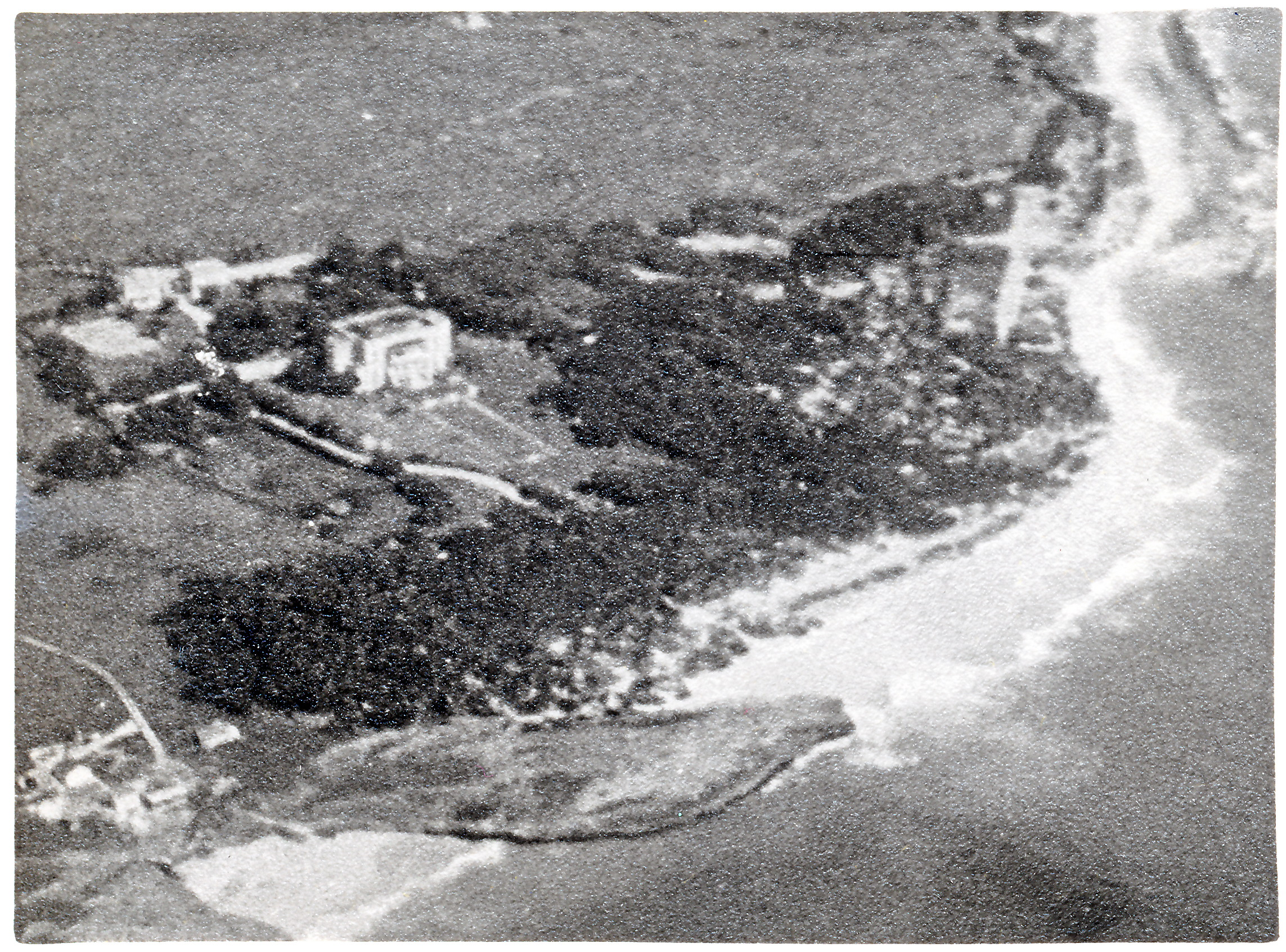
Sam Lord's Castle in 1949.

Samuel Hall Lord (c. 1778 – 5 November 1844), also known as Sam Lord, was one of the most famous buccaneers on the island of Barbados. Lord amassed great wealth for his castle-mansion in Barbados. He did this through the direct plundering of ships stranded in the coral reefs just off the coast of his estate (UN/LOCODE: BB SLC). According to legend, Sam Lord would hang lanterns high in the coconut trees around his estate. Passing ships far out at sea would think it was the port city of Bridgetown and would sail towards the reef in the area, leading them to wreck their ships. Sam Lord would then board the ships and keep the riches for his castle, which stood in the parish of Saint Philip.

== Sam Lord's Castle ==
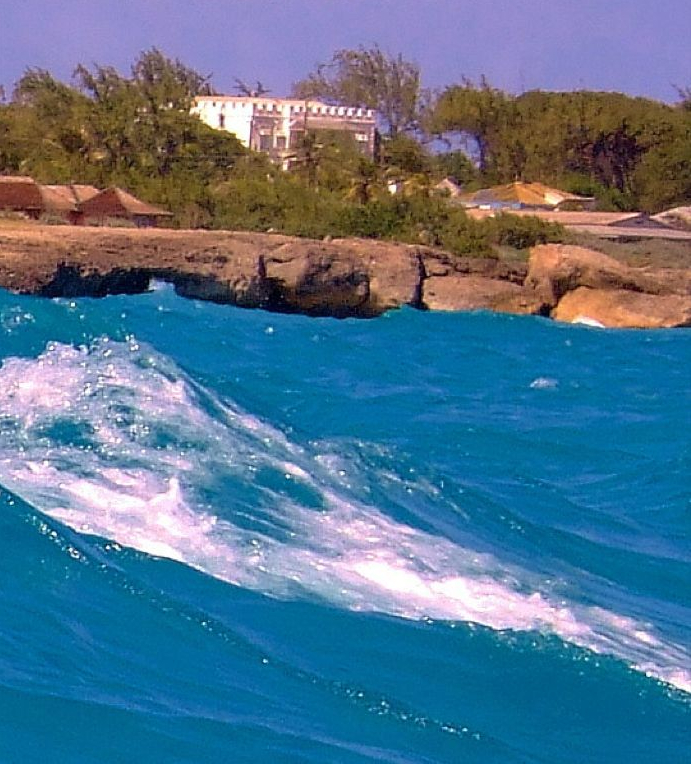
Sam Lord's Castle seen from the ocean (2010)

Eventually his castle estate was turned into a hotel called the Sam Lord's Castle. However, due to massive debt this hotel was auctioned off and parts of it were scheduled to be demolished to make way for a larger hotel development on the property by the new owners. In 2007 Sam Lord's Castle was bought by CLICO (Barbados), but due to financial woes, the redevelopment didn't happen. For a while the Government of Barbados was proposing a buy-out. On 20 October 2010 Sam Lord's Castle was gutted by a major fire.

The castle and surrounding property were eventually acquired by the Wyndham Hotel Group. Construction on a new resort started in 2017. Architect's plans show the castle walls stabilized as a preserved ruin.

== The beginning ==
Sam Lord's parents were John Lord (died 1799), and Bathsheba Hall Sarjeant. Sam, born in 1778, had two brothers and three sisters: John Thomas, Mary Bathsheba, Richard Sargeant, Sara Bathsheba and Elizabeth Bathsheba.

Sam had two boys with his black concubine, a maid at the estate. They were Edward Samuel Lord and William Lord. He also had three children with his wife Lucy Wightwick: son, Orechus Lord (27 January 1809–1811), and daughters, Emma Lacey Lord (born 22 April 1811), and Cecilia Lord (born 17 November 1812). Most of Sam Lord's descendants, starting with his son Edward, would move to St. Lucia (Castries area).

Edward Samuel Lord married Elizabeth Armour and they raised their family in St. Lucia. They had four children: Frederick Nugent Lord, Emily Lord, Heather Lord, and Elizabeth Lord. It is Frederick's offspring that can be easily followed to Toronto. Frederick met Annie Lawrence, daughter of William Lawrence and Ellen Higgins of England. Annie left England at the age of 16 to move to St. Lucia to be with her father William. (Annie by the way, moved from St. Lucia to Toronto on 22 May 1922 and died there - at home (394 Kingswood Road on 23 February 1966 at the age of 98.))

Frederick Nugent Lord and Annie Lawrence had 14 children: Wallace, Dora, Nellie, Ruby and twin Daisy who died at 7 years, Nelson, Freddie, Walter, Frank, Maurice, twins Pearl and Diamond, Nugent, and Annie. Only eight of these children lived to see Toronto, most of them dying in infancy. Those making it to Toronto included Wallace, Dora, Ruby, Nellie, Walter, Nelson, Nugent and Annie. The last to die was Annie whose husband Charles Weinreb died in 1965. Annie died in Waterloo, Ontario, on 18 September 2003.

Wallace, the eldest of Frederick and Annie married Florence Chamberlain and they had three children, Frederick, Wilbert, and Ann Madelaine (note the repetition in names). Ann Madelaine married Herbert Wallace (coincidence in name) from London Ontario. They raised their five children in Scarborough, Ontario.

Sam Lord's third daughter Cecilia married James Haywood, a solicitor, in the third quarter of 1840 in the area of Chepstow, Monmouthshire. Later they lived at Dosthill House, Wilnecost, Tamworth, Staffs. They had at least seven children: Walker (b. 1843), Elizabeth (b. 1845), Francis (b. 1846), James (b. 1847), Cecilia (b. 1849) and Christine (b. 1854). Christine married William Powys in 1875 but died childless in 1879 in Boulogne, France.

== See also ==
- Piracy in the Caribbean
- History of Barbados
