= Oistins =

- City
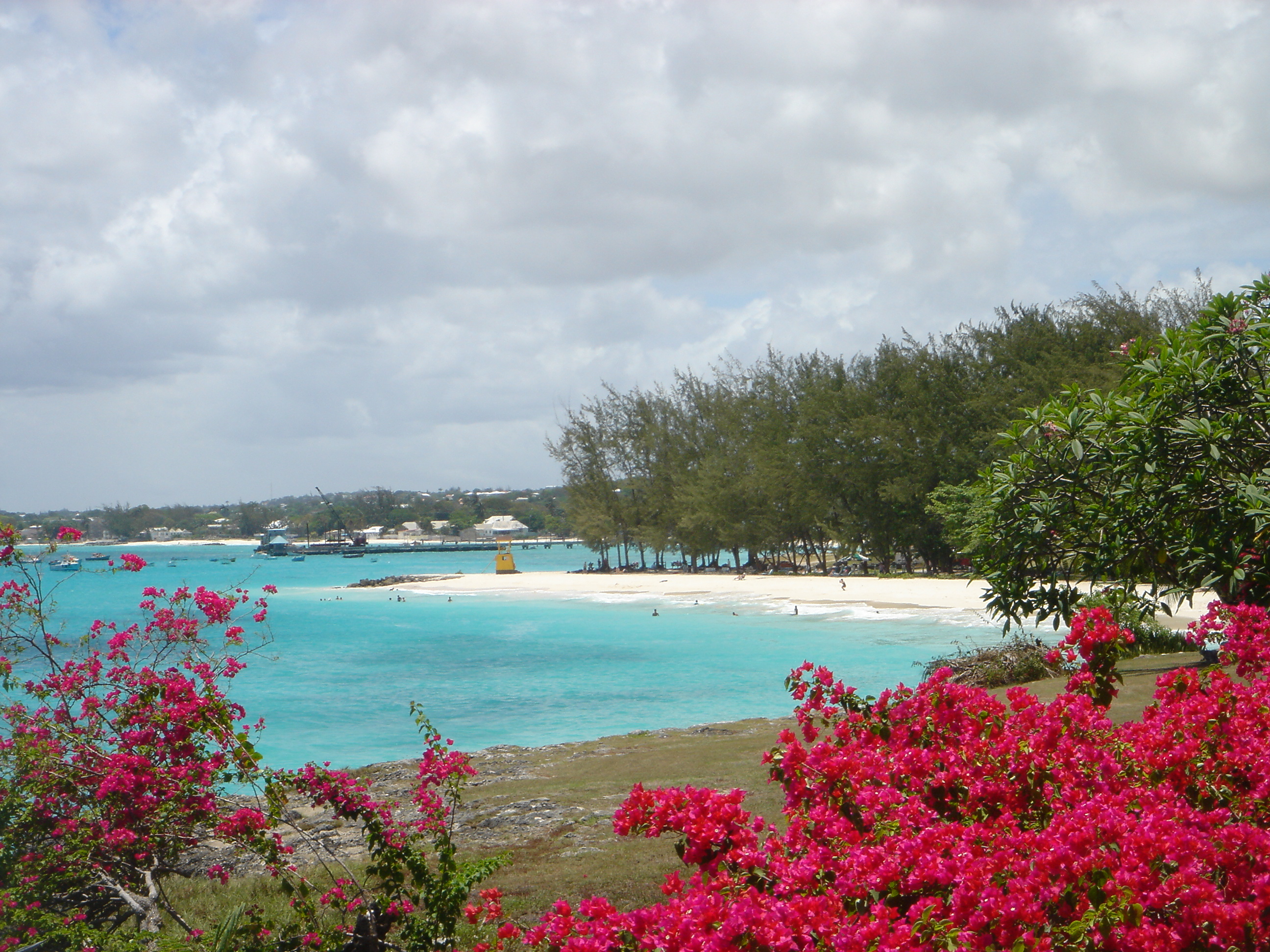

- Location on a map of Barbados parishes
- Coordinates: 13°3′52″N 59°32′40″W
- Country: Barbados
- Parish: Christ Church

Population (2013)
  - Total: 2,285
- Time zone: UTC-4 (Eastern Caribbean Time Zone)
- Area code: +1 246

Oistins (Pronounced /'ȯis-tins/ -- UN/LOCODE: BB OST) is a coastal area located in the country of Barbados. It is situated centrally along the coastline of the parish of Christ Church, and is the parish capital. The area includes a fishing village as well as a tourist area with a variety of bars, rum shops, and shopping arcades.

== Etymology ==
It has been thought that the name "Oistins" is a corruption of "Austin's". Austin was an early landowner in this area, described by Richard Ligon, one of the first historians of Barbados, as "a wild, mad, drunken fellow whose lewd and extravagant carriage made him infamous in the island".

The name Oistin is known from the annals of Irish and Highlands of Scotland history. It is probably a Gaelification of the Norse name Thorstein. The name Oistin is still used in Ireland today.

== History ==
In a historical context, Oistins was known for being the location of the Treaty of Oistins Barbados charter, thought to have been signed at the site of the Mermaid's Inn, on 17 January 1652. The treaty was to bring a formal end to fighting between colonial settlers of Barbados and the English Commonwealth over Barbados's right to trade with Spanish controlled Netherlands among other demands. Afterwards Oistins became the location of the Anglican parish church of Christ Church, the former Christ Church district hospital, and the former Barbados Coast Guard submarine station. In close proximity, many workers of Gerald Bull's Project HARP lived around Oistins and the nearby airport.

== Tourism ==
A tradition has developed towards the end of the 20th century for tourists in Oistins to join with locals at the Friday night (and slightly quieter Saturday night) Fish Fry and "lime" (social gathering), which sees many food and drink stalls selling fried fish meals and local craft, all to the accompaniment of loud music, while older inhabitants practise more traditional 'old time' dancing. The area is fairly close to many of the south coast hotels in Barbados and has several beaches, for example Miami Beach.

=== Plane spotting ===
The beach at Oistins is situated on the usual flight path of many aircraft landing at the Grantley Adams International Airport and is therefore a popular aircraft spotting location. The area also acts as a small port with offshore landing for ships delivering fossils fuels to the island.
