= Freshwater Bay, Barbados =

Coordinates: 13°08′N 59°37′W

Freshwater Bay is located between Paynes Bay and Carlisle Bay in Bridgetown, in the southwest of Barbados. Its name comes from the large number of streams that deposit fresh water into the ocean at the location.
