= Paynes Bay, Barbados =

Beach and bay in Barbados

Coordinates: 13°10′N 59°38′W

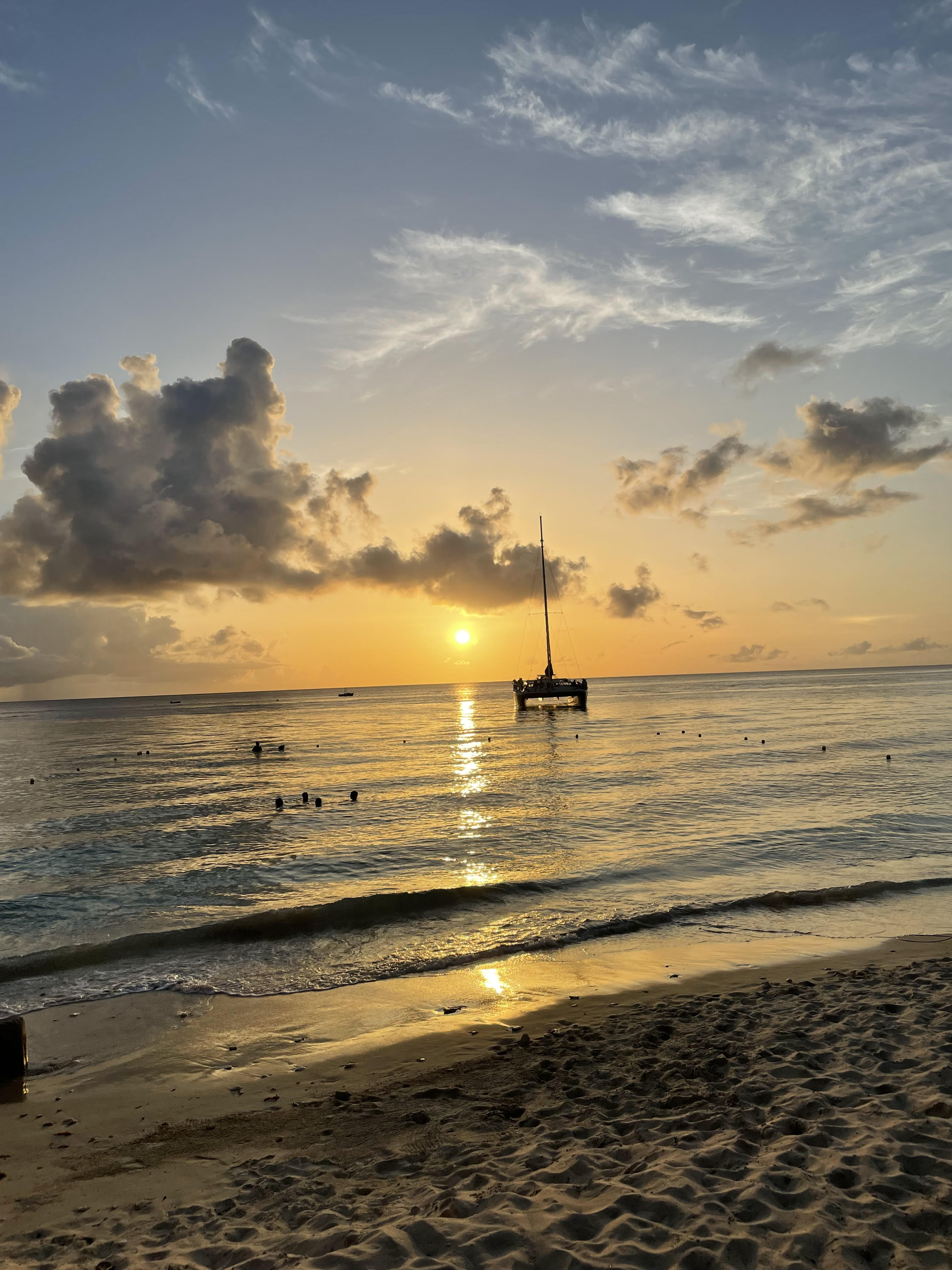
View from Paynes Bay

Paynes Bay, sometimes called the "Platinum Coast", is located on the west coast of Barbados. The resort hotel Sandy Lane is situated at the northern end of Paynes Bay.

== See also ==
- List of beaches in Barbados
