= Needham's Point Lighthouse =

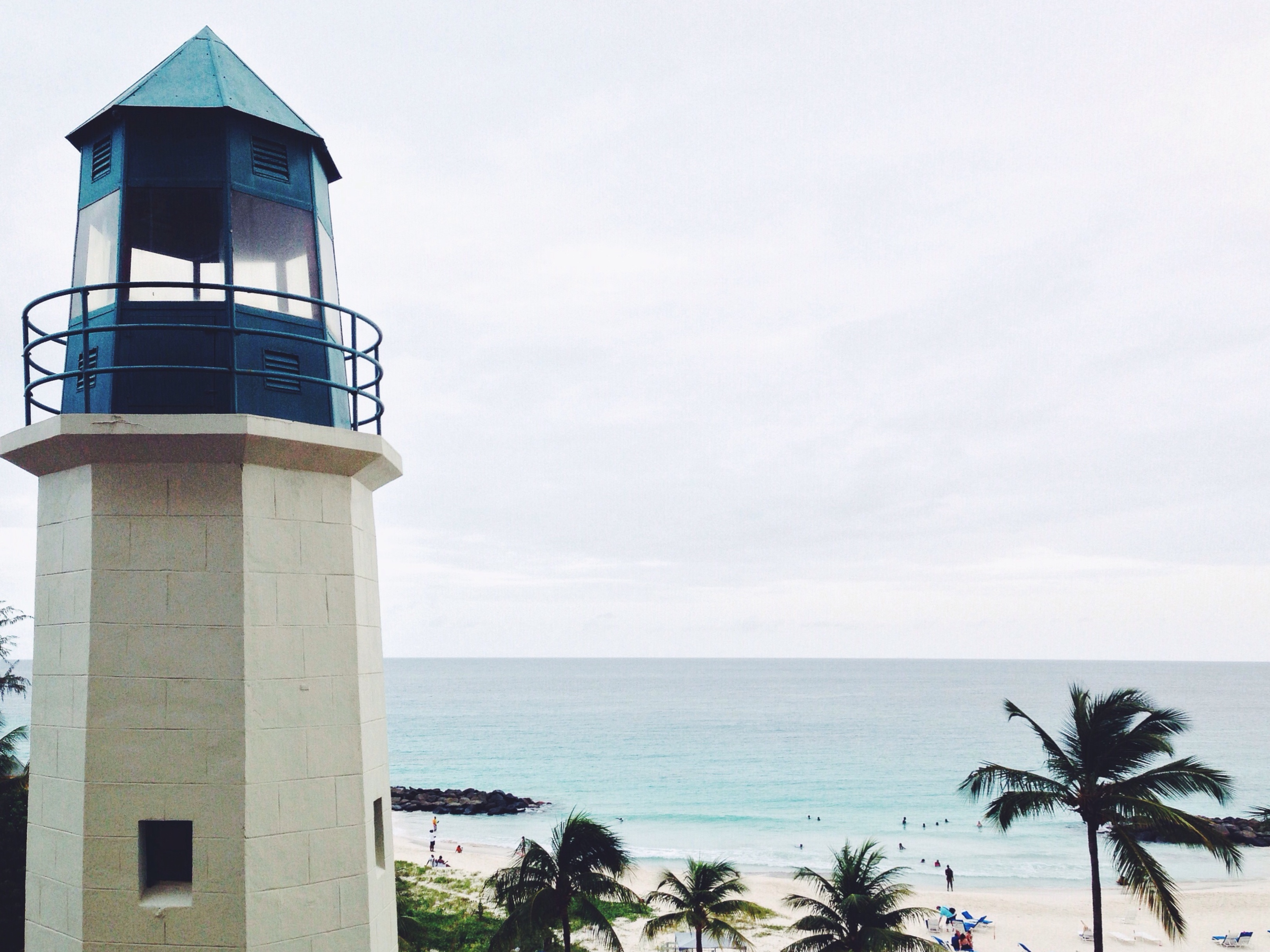
- Location: Carlisle Bay; Barbados
- Coordinates: 13°04′43″N 59°36′39.4″W

Tower
- Constructed: 1855
- Construction: masonry tower
- Height: 13 metres (43 ft) (first); 9 metres (30 ft) (current)
- Shape: octagonal tower with balcony and lantern (first) steel mast (current)
- Markings: white tower and black lantern (first) white and red bands (current)

Light
- Focal height: 13 metres (43 ft) (current)
- Range: 14 nmi (26 km; 16 mi) (white), 10 nmi (19 km; 12 mi) (red)
- Characteristic: FI WR 8s.

Needham's Point Lighthouse is a lighthouse located in the southwest coast of Barbados.

Needham's Point lighthouse is one of four still existent historic lighthouses in Barbados. Unlike the others it has a stationary rather than rotating beacon.

== History ==
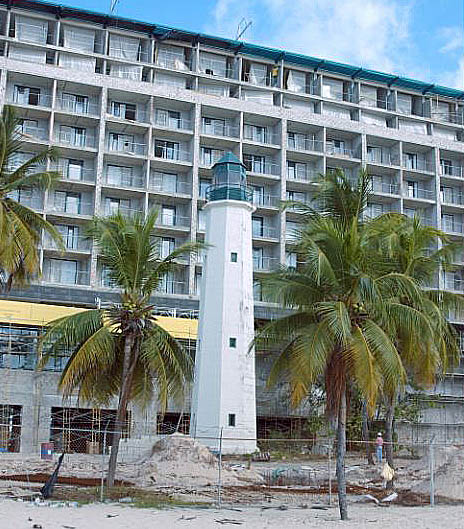
Needham's Point Lighthouse as seen from the coastline

The octagonal lighthouse was constructed in 1855 at the southern end of Carlisle Bay. It is currently non-functional and partially restored by the Hilton Hotel which owns the lighthouse and surrounding grounds. Because of the proximity of a large block of rooms, the lighthouse can only be seen from the beach to the south of the hotel.

During its period of active use the lighthouse's focal plane stood at 43 ft / 13 m and flashed at an 8-second interval. Owing to the stationary nature of the lights the lighthouse lens was half red and half green to allow sailors to know whether they were port or starboard side of Carlisle Bay.

== See also ==
- List of lighthouses in Barbados
