= Roger Edmonds =

English cricketer

Personal information
- Full name: Roger Bertram Edmonds
- Born: 2 March 1941 (age 85); Moseley, Worcestershire, England
- Batting: Right-handed
- Bowling: Right-arm medium-fast, right-arm off-spin
- Role: Bowler

Domestic team information
- Years: Team
- 1962–1967: Warwickshire

Career statistics
Competition	First-class	List A
Matches	78	3
Runs scored	1,006	12
Batting average	14.57	–
100s/50s	1/1	0/0
Top score	102*	12*
Balls bowled	10,263	150
Wickets	146	7
Bowling average	27.35	10.42
5 wickets in innings	2	0
10 wickets in match	0	–
Best bowling	5/40	4/33
Catches/stumpings	35/–	1/–
- Source: Cricinfo, 21 November 2026

Roger Bertram Edmonds (born 2 March 1941) is a former English cricketer who played first-class and List A cricket for Warwickshire between 1962 and 1967. He was born in Moseley, Birmingham.

Edmonds played as a right-handed lower order batsman and as a right-arm bowler who could deliver the ball at medium-pace or as an off-break. He made his first-class debut in a couple of matches in 1962 but his early cricket career was restricted as he was a physical education student and did not appear for Warwickshire in any of his first three seasons until late in July. Forming the new-ball attack with another latecomer, the medical student Rudi Webster, Edmonds took five Derbyshire wickets for 40 runs in 1963 and these remained the best figures of his career. He was a late arrival again in 1964, and this time took five second-innings wickets in the match against the Australian touring team.

Edmonds became a full-time cricketer from 1965, and played fairly regularly for Warwickshire's first team in that year, though perversely his bowling became less successful: more expensive, and there were no further five-wicket innings. His batting developed and in 1966 he made an unbeaten century in the annual Warwickshire match against Scotland, which had first-class status. He switched fully to bowling off-spin in 1967, but was also frequently absent through illness and injury, and at the end of that season he left the Warwickshire staff, the county recruiting the West Indian Test off-spinner Lance Gibbs as its overseas player from 1968. His final matches for Warwickshire were on a non-first-class tour of East Africa in the autumn of 1967.
