= Bayfield, Barbados =

Coordinates: 13°09′N 59°27′W

Bayfield is a village in Saint Philip Parish in Barbados. It has a pond in its center with masked ducks, green herons, common gallinules, and snowy egrets.
