= Workhall, Barbados =

Village in Barbados

Coordinates: 13°07′N 59°27′W

Workhall is a village in Saint Philip Parish in Barbados.
