= Bentleys =

Village in Barbados

Coordinates: 13°07′N 59°30′W

Bentleys is a village in Saint Philip Parish in Barbados. Prior to 1981, it was one of the over 600 plantations tenantries for which the Barbados government legislated to have them convert into rural freehold villages.
