= Carlisle Bay, Barbados =

Bay in Saint Michael, Barbados

Carlisle Bay
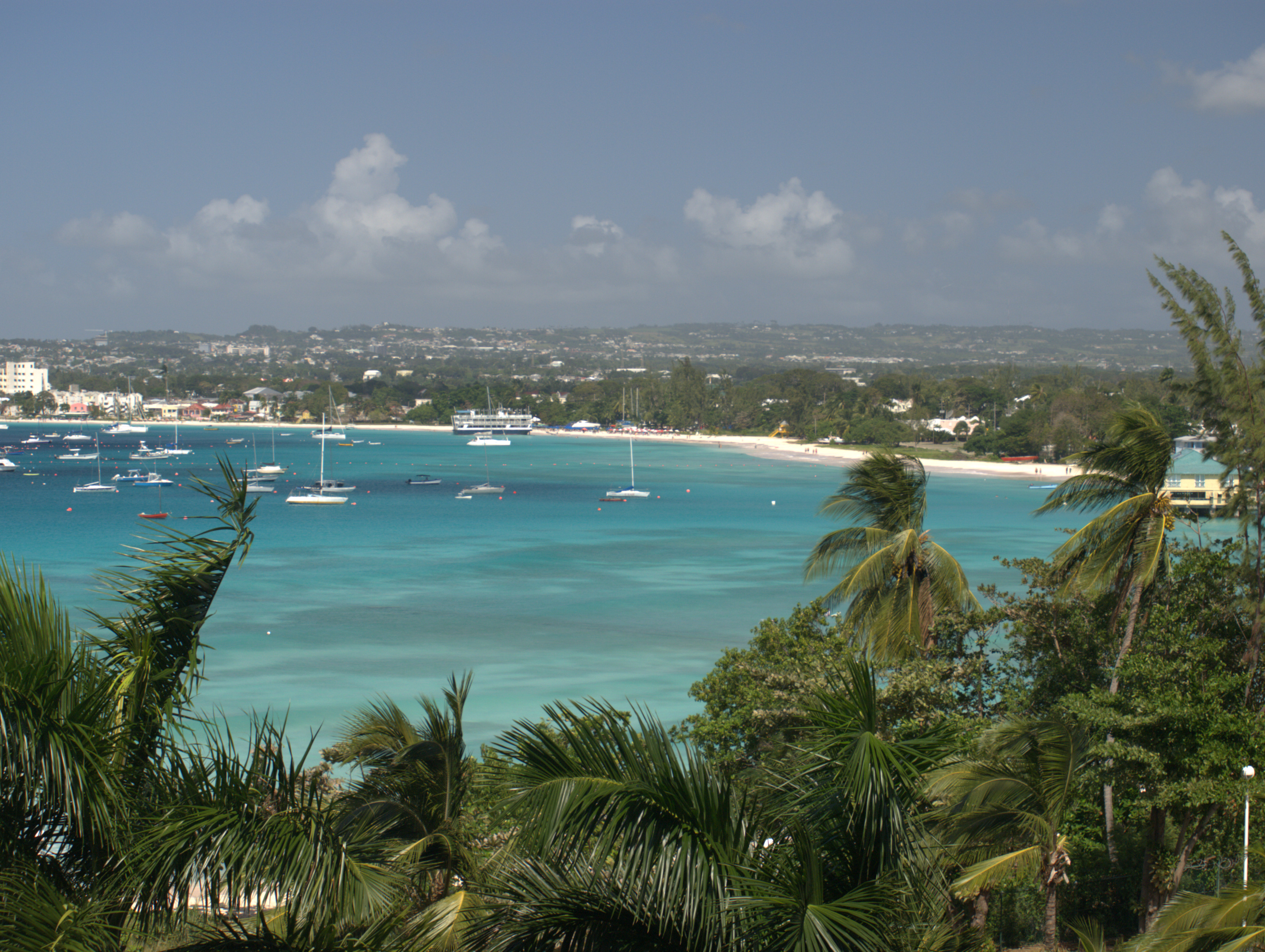
- Carlisle Bay, Barbados

- Location within Barbados
- Location: Southwest coast
- Coordinates: 13°05′N 59°37′W
- River sources: Constitution River
- Ocean/sea sources: Atlantic Ocean
- Basin countries: Barbados
- Islands: Barbados, West Indies
- Settlements: Bridgetown

Carlisle Bay is a small natural harbour located in the southwest region of Barbados. The island nation's capital, Bridgetown, is situated on this bay which has been turned into a marine park. Carlisle Bay's marine park is a popular spot on the island for scuba diving. Many relics, such as anchors and cannonballs, from ships can be found on the ocean floor in Carlisle Bay.

The bay takes its name from Barbados' second Lord Proprietor, James Hay, 1st Earl of Carlisle. Lord Carlisle claimed the island through Royal grant on behalf of King Charles I of England in 1627.

Carlisle Bay is home to one of Barbados' historic lighthouses the Needham's Point Lighthouse.

A Dutch fleet led by Michiel de Ruyter during the Second Anglo-Dutch War was repelled by defending English forces in April 1665. During the Second World War a British ship, the Cornwallis, was torpedoed by a German U-Boat, at this location.

== See also ==
- Freshwater Bay, Barbados
- Oistins Bay
