= Platinum Coast =

Beach in Barbados

Coordinates: 13.1718°N 59.6374°W

The Platinum Coast is a stretch of powdery white sandy-beach located on the leeward side of Barbados. Located to the North of Holetown. Its area title has been broadened in more recent times to include much of the coastline of the parish of Saint James. The Platinum Coast is a spot consisting mostly of nouveau riche to the country of Barbados. Upscale hotels in the area include the Royal Westmoreland and Sandy Lane Beach resort where golfer Tiger Woods was married.

The area is a hotspot for wealthy global people and many locals in the area are quick to point out the homes of the 18 global billionaires said to live in the Platinum Coast area.

The original name for this area was the "Gold Coast" but the name has changed in recent years.

== Notes ==
- Banay, Sophia (July 2004). "Found Colony". Forbes Magazine. "A view of the resort and of the Platinum Coast beyond"
