= Miami Beach, Barbados =

Beach in Barbados

Coordinates: 13°3′35″N 59°32′23″W

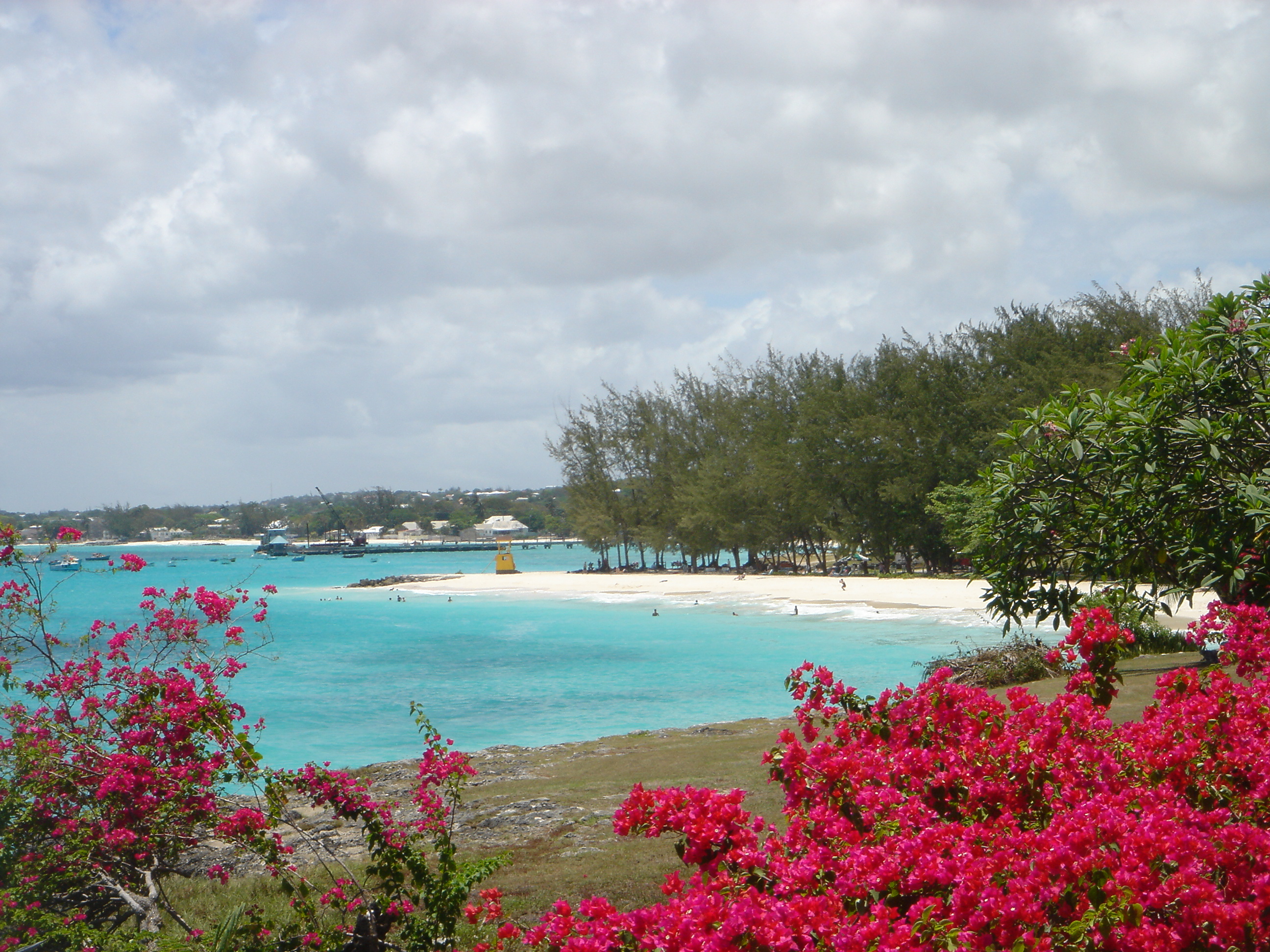
Miami Beach, Barbados from Enterprise Coast Road

Miami Beach, Barbados, near the town of Oistins, is a popular sandy beach in Barbados. It is located on the south coast of the island, with usually calm waters and brilliant sunset views. On its north side is Enterprise Beach, a much more sheltered bay popular with families. Miami Beach is popular with both locals and tourists. Each morning local seniors swim in the sea and exercise on the beach. Also a great break for bodysurfing and bodyboarding.

A large yellow lifeguard station stands at the junction between Miami Beach and Enterprise Beach.

It is also a popular docking area for cruises on board a catamaran. Miami Beach has a beach shopping complex and a snack bar which serves a range of local food and rum punch. There are also gardens close by. Miami Beach has been voted one of the Top 10 beaches in Barbados.

In 2004 the beach started to suffer erosion by the sea as a natural occurrence, and the beach is narrower than it was 20 years ago. Action by the local authorities (Barbados Coastal Zone Management Unit (CZMU) and the National Conservation Commission (NCC) has successfully stopped the erosion and started a programme, which is currently allowing the beach to naturally heal itself.

Miami Beach is considered to be a "local hangout place" by those who live near it.
