= Ragged Point Lighthouse =

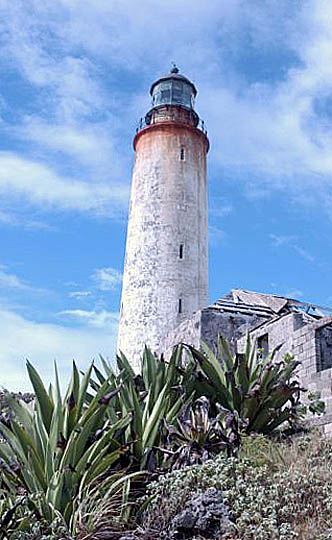
- Location: Saint Philip, Barbados
- Coordinates: 13.163726°N 59.432906°W

Tower
- Constructed: 1875
- Construction: limestone
- Height: 29.5 metres (97 ft)
- Shape: cylindrical tower with balcony and lantern
- Markings: white tower and black lantern

Light
- Deactivated: 2007-2011
- Focal height: 65 metres (213 ft)
- Range: 3 nmi (5.6 km; 3.5 mi)
- Characteristic: F R

Ragged Point Lighthouse is situated at the easternmost point of the island of Barbados, near the village of Ragged Point in the parish of Saint Philip.

== See also ==
- List of lighthouses in Barbados
