= Saint Martins, Barbados =

Village in Saint Philip Parish, Barbados

Coordinates: 13°05′N 59°28′W

Saint Martins is a village in Saint Philip Parish in Barbados. It is a 5 minutes drive east of Sir Grantly Adams International Airports. Nearby villages include Rockhall, Gemswick, Foul Bay, and Kirtons.

== St. Martin's Church ==
The most prominent historical building in the village is the whitewashed St. Martin's Anglican Church. The village is named after the church, which in turn is named for Martin of Tours, a Bishop in the late Roman Empire who was a popular saint in Western Christianity. As of 1846, St. Martin was a chapel of the established church of Barbados. In 1866, the incumbent was Henry Collymore. In 1891, it became an independent parish with its own vestry.

== Tourism ==
Due to its proximity to the airport, this community is a popular destination hub for tourists from North America. There are many vacation rentals in the village, from simple apartment rentals to villas and resort hotels. There are also many restaurants and bars in the vicinity. Condé Nast Traveller rated "Barbados is the best island to go to in the Caribbean for families, and there’s everything from larger, more affordable resorts to smaller boutique offerings."

Nearby attractions, all a ten-minute drive from the village, and within the southwestern half of Saint Philip Parish, include the 1660 Sunbury Plantation House, Foursquare Rum Distillery, and the beaches at Foul Bay and Crane Beach.

== See also ==
- Bajan English
