= Sandy Lane (resort) =

Barbados luxury resort

Sandy Lane Hotel
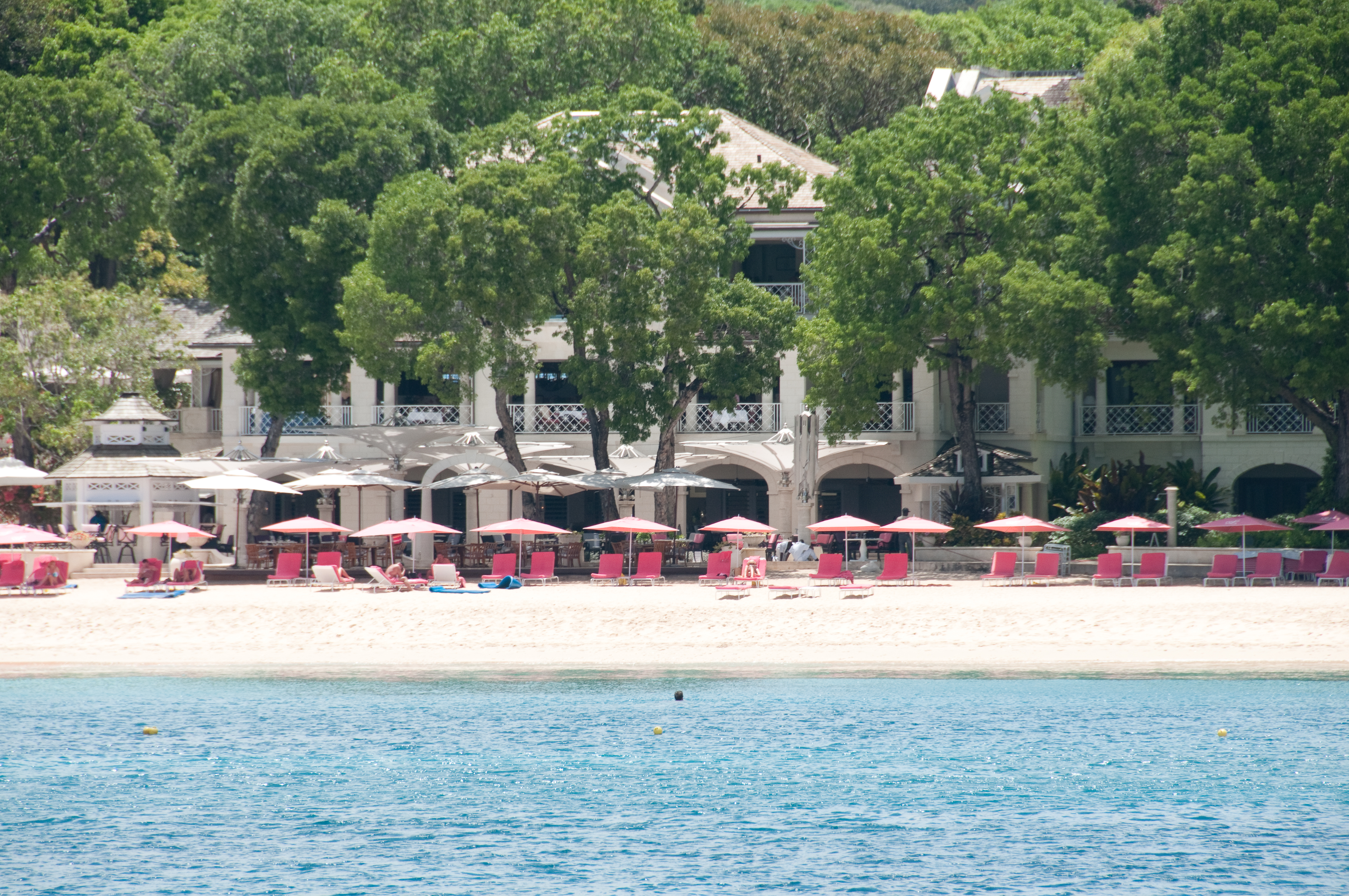
- The Sandy Lane Resort

- Location within Barbados

General information
- Location: Holetown, Saint James, Barbados
- Coordinates: 13.1731°N 59.6369°W
- Opening: 1 January 1961
- Owner: J. P. McManus, Dermot Desmond and John Magnier

Other information
- Number of rooms: 113
- Number of suites: 22
- Number of restaurants: 4 + 7 Bars

Website
- www.sandylane.com

Sandy Lane is a luxury five-star beachfront resort close to Holetown and Paynes Bay on the island of Barbados. Sandy Lane was opened in 1961 by Ronald Tree, a former British politician, as a luxury hotel and golf course on what had been a sugar plantation. In 1998, the hotel was put up for sale by Granada plc, and five Irish businessmen, including J. P. McManus, Dermot Desmond and John Magnier, bought it. The original resort was then demolished in a three-year, $450 million upgrade and renovation.

== Features ==
The resort features 113 guestrooms and suites as well as a five-bedroom villa, a 47,000 sq ft (4,400 m^{2}) Spa, four restaurants, seven bars and three golf courses.

Sandy Lane is known as one of the Caribbean's most stylish and family-friendly hotels, as well as being a haven of the rich and famous. Past guests said to have stayed at the Sandy Lane hotel include Maria Callas, Simon Cowell, Andrea Corr (co-owner Dermot Desmond's daughter-in-law), T. S. Eliot, Jacqueline Kennedy, Aristotle Onassis, Sidney Poitier and Robin Van Persie.

On 5 October 2004, professional golfer Tiger Woods married his Swedish fiancée Elin Nordegren at the resort. It was reported that Woods booked out the entire hotel for his guests, who included Charles Barkley and Michael Jordan. The owners of the hotel, who include Woods' close friend J.P. McManus, reportedly threw the wedding at the hotel as a gift for the couple. It was the first and only American wedding to be held in Barbados in the 21st century with Tiger Woods being the final American to get married in Barbados, it was also the second famous celebrity wedding to be held in Barbados for the year 2004 after Alison Hinds' wedding which was held on 26 February of the same year. On 11 November 2011, NBC's Today filmed the day five segment of Where in the World Is Matt Lauer? pool-side and on the beach of the resort hotel.

=== Golf ===
Since the hotel first opened, the Sandy Lane Resort has been known for its golf courses. The first, The Old Nine, is a nine-hole course and was built along with the hotel in 1961. The other two, The Green Monkey and The Country Club, are both 18-hole championship courses and were designed by the well-known golf course designer Tom Fazio. The Green Monkey has been reported as being the most expensive golf course ever built.

In 2006 The Country Club hosted the World Golf Championships World Cup, which was won by Germany.

== Awards ==
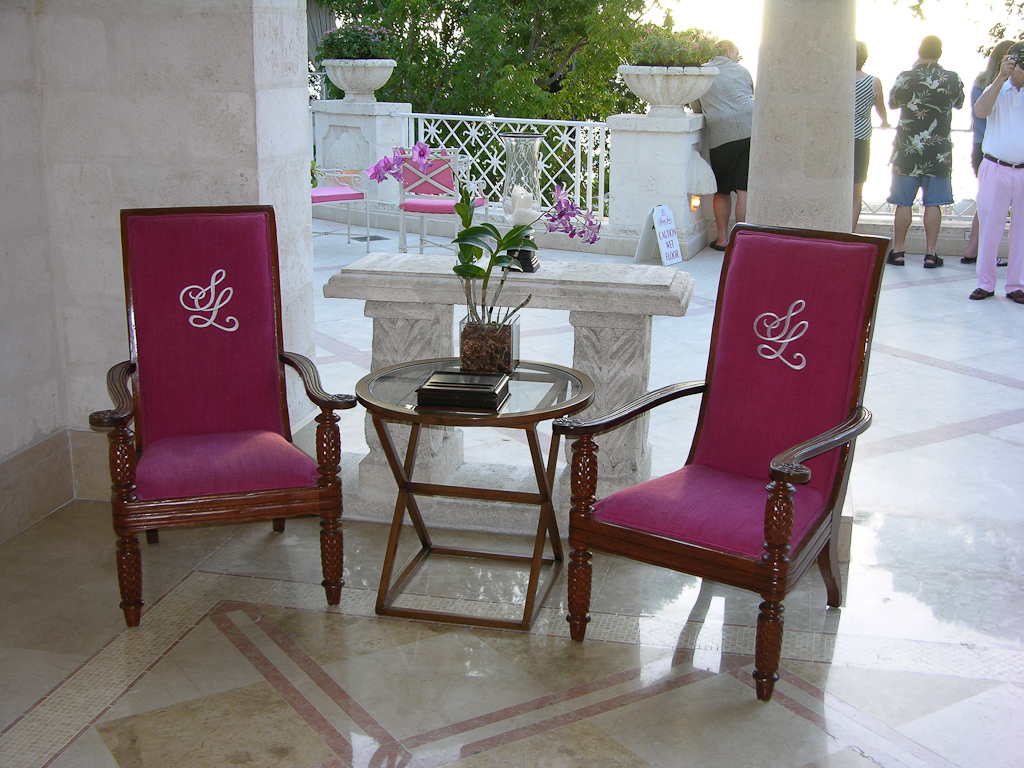
Hotel decor

- "Barbados' Leading Golf Resort" - 2004, 2005, 2006, 2008 - by the World Travel Awards
- "Barbados' Leading Hotel" - 2007 - by the World Travel Awards
- "Barbados' Leading Resort" - 2004, 2005, 2006, 2008, 2009, 2010, 2013 - by the World Travel Awards
- "Barbados' Leading Spa Resort" - 2007, 2011, 2012 - by the World Travel Awards
- "Caribbean's Leading Golf Resort" - 2002, 2003, 2004 - by the World Travel Awards
- "Caribbean's Leading Resort" - 2005 - by the World Travel Awards
- Named one of the top 50 hotels in the world 2023
- Conde Nast Readers choice award 2023
