= Marchfield, Barbados =

Coordinates: 13°07′N 59°28′W

Marchfield is a village in Saint Philip Parish in Barbados.
