= The Crane, Barbados =

Resort in Saint Philip, Barbados

Coordinates: 13°06′20″N 59°26′44″W

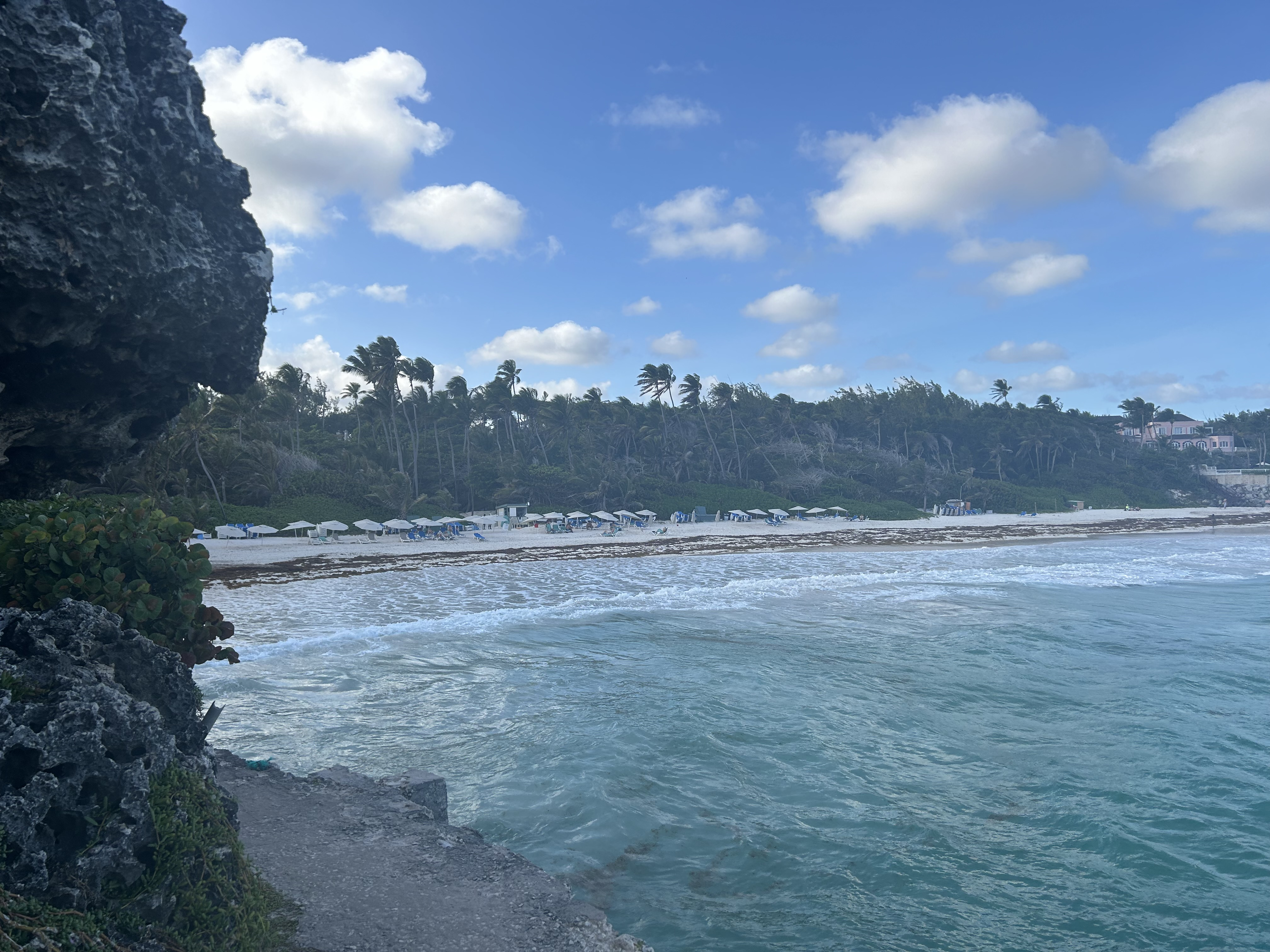
View of the beach at The Crane Resort in Barbados in March 2024

The Crane is a resort hotel in Saint Philip in Barbados. Opened in 1887, it is reportedly the oldest continuously operating resort in the Caribbean.

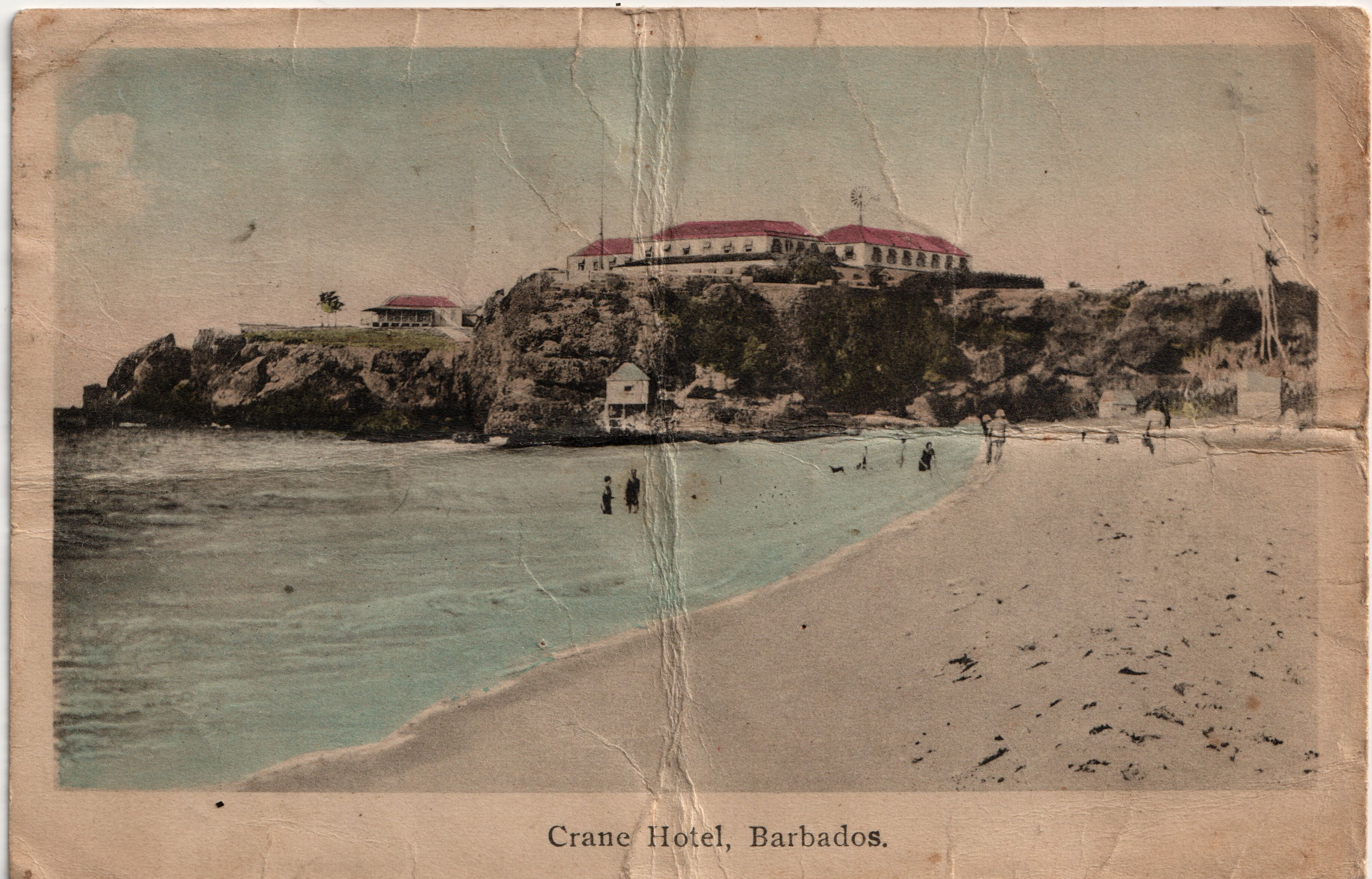
Crane Hotel, Barbados about 1930
