= Saint Philip, Barbados =

Saint Philip
- Parish
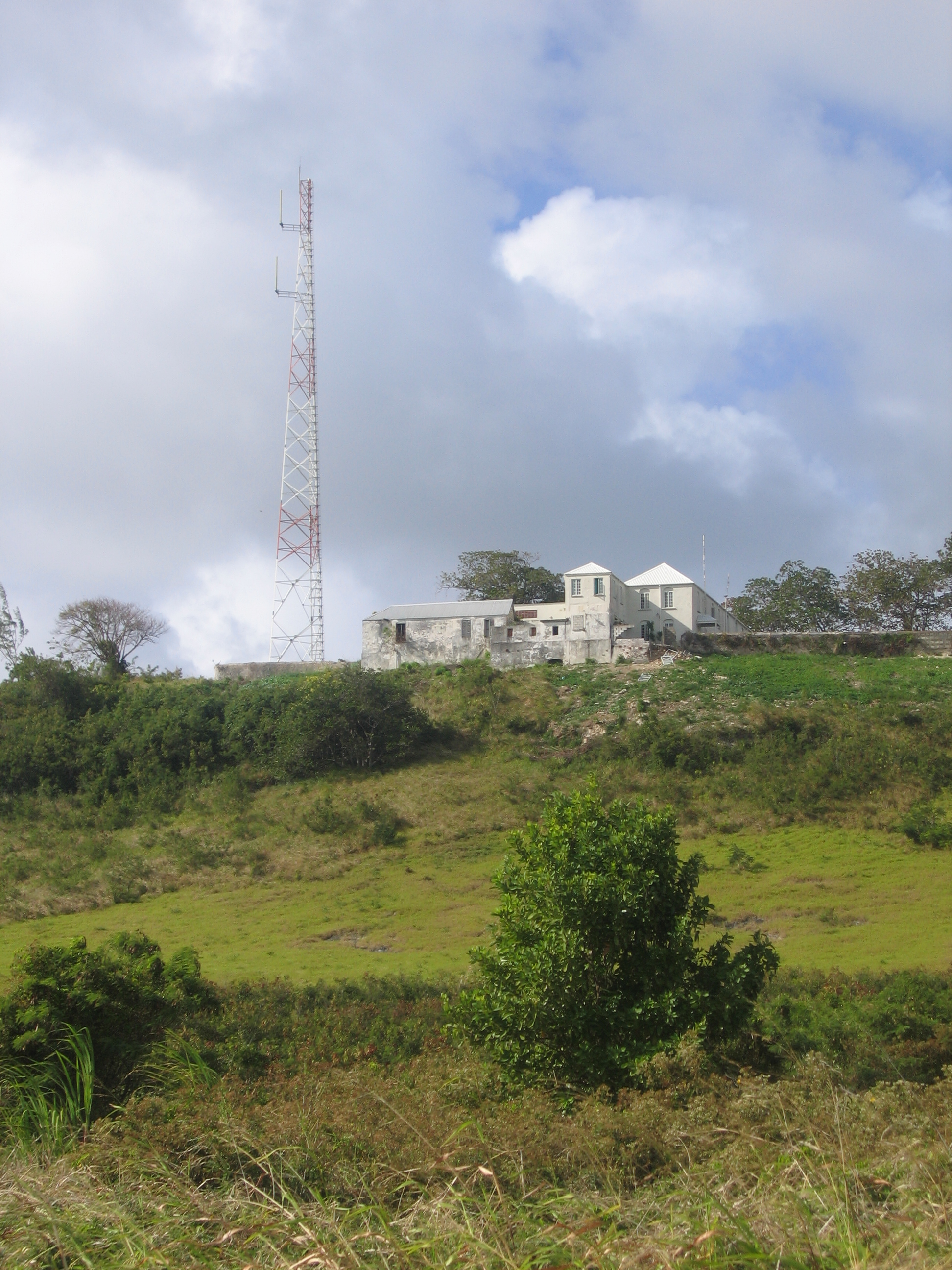

- Map of Barbados showing Saint Philip
- Coordinates: 13°07′N 59°28′W
- Country: Barbados
- Largest city: Six Cross Roads

Government
  - Type: Parliamentary democracy
  - Parliamentary seats: 3

Area
  - Total: 60 km^{2} (23 sq mi)

Population (2010 census)
  - Total: 30,662
  - Density: 510/km^{2} (1,300/sq mi)
- ISO 3166 code: BB-10

Saint Philip is a parish of Barbados at the easternmost end of the island. Saint Philip’s Parish Church was built as the Anglican parish church in 1640.

St. Philip has the largest land area of the 11 parishes of Barbados and has a relatively flat 'close to sea-level' terrain. St. Philip has the largest area of crop cultivation making it locally considered "the country". St. Philip does not have a 'true' city as some other parishes but rather 'areas' and 'villages'. Six Cross Roads is the largest area by virtue of both commercial and residential population and is the central hub for the parish.

Six Cross Roads, or locally known as just Six Roads, is a roundabout and its immediate neighborhood of which six roads converge extended in from the west 'from city' (Bridgetown); north-west toward Four Cross Roads and St. George; north-east toward Bushy Park; east toward Bayfield; south-east toward The Crane; south-west toward Oistins. Though there are a few areas in Barbados known as 'Four Cross Roads' there is only one area known as 'Six Cross Roads'. This parish is home to the only 'dependency' of Barbados called Culpepper Island. This tiny rock in the ocean is used as a feeding ground for sheep but cannot be reached unless by boat or by foot at low tide. The parish of Saint Philip is the main on-shore area of Barbados involved in the local oil industry.

St. Philip is well-known on the local music and entertainment scene for producing entertainers. Well-known calypsonians and performers Red Plastic Bag, John King, Ronnie D. and Lil Rick all hail from this eastern parish. It was also the first parish to have its own carnival - The St. Philip Carnival. A 2020 song by calypsonian Ronnie D called the 'St Philip Anthem' honours the parish.

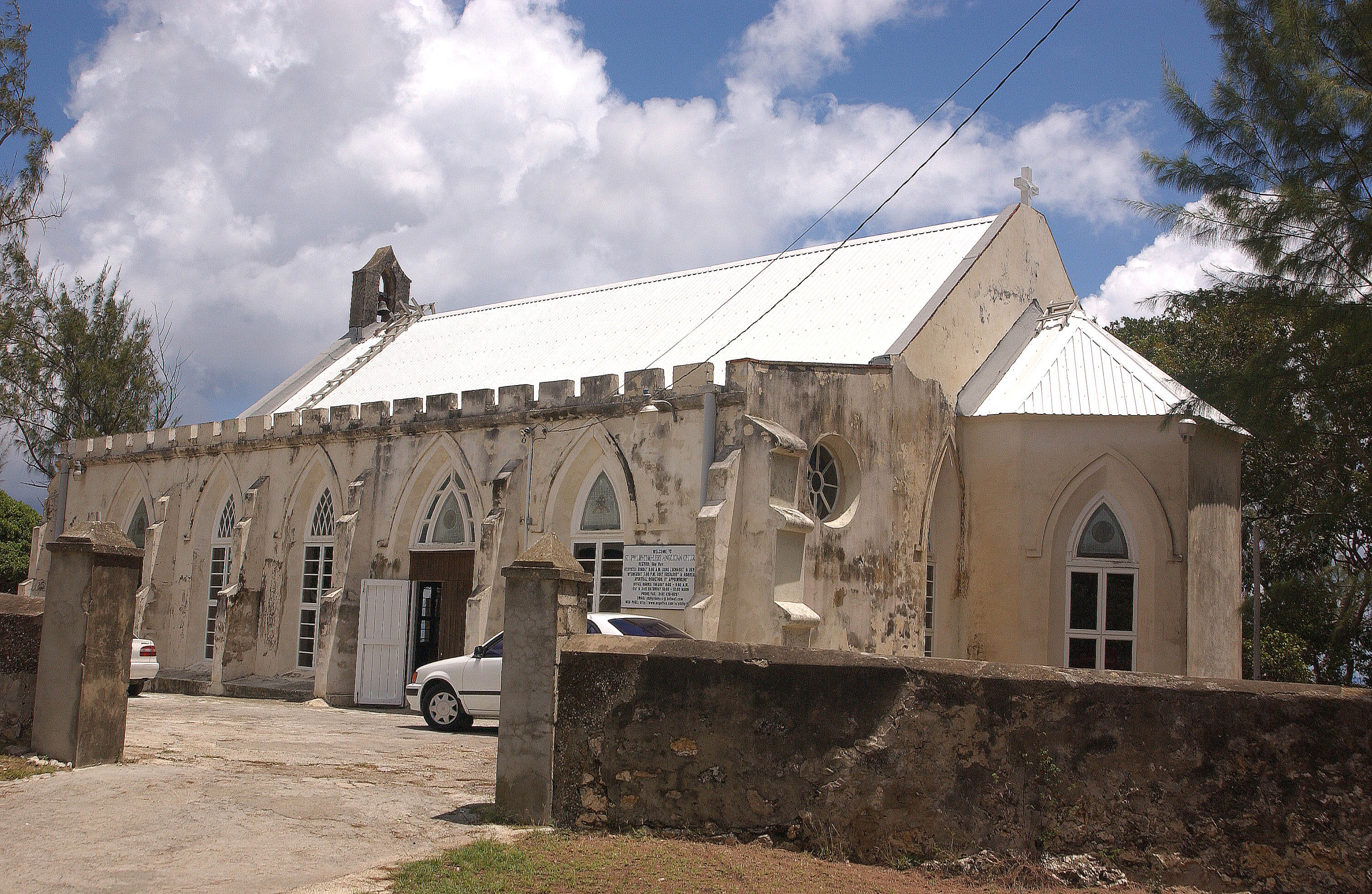
St. Philip the Lesser church in the parish

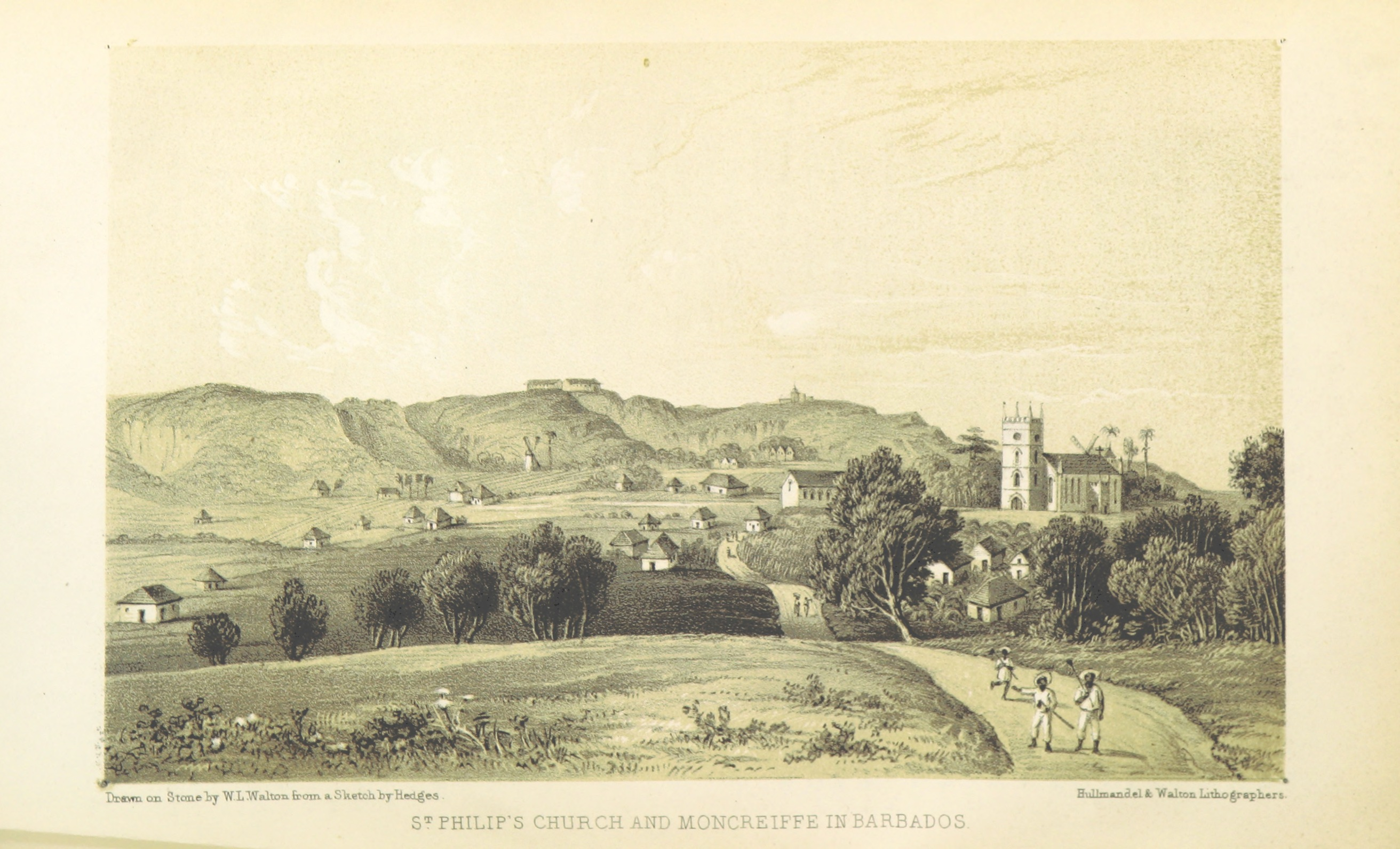
St.Philip's church and Moncreiffe in Barbados, 1848

== Geography ==
=== Populated places ===
The parish contains the following towns, villages, localities, settlements, communities and hamlets:

- Bayfield
- Bayleys
- Bel Air
- Bentleys
- Blades (see Six Cross Roads)
- Blades Hill
- Brereton
- Carrington
- Caveland
- Church Village
- Foul Bay
- Four Roads (see Six Cross Roads)
- Gaskin
- Gemswick
- Hampton (see Six Cross Roads)
- Highland (see Six Cross Roads)
- Kirtons (see Six Cross Roads)
- Marchfield
- Saint Martins
- Sam Lords
- Six Cross Roads
- Ragged Point
- Sunbury
- The Crane
- Three Houses
- Union Development
- Woodbourne
- Workhall

=== Places of interest ===
- Bayleys Plantation
- Bottom Bay
- Bushy Park Circuit
- Crane Beach
- Foursquare Rum Distillery
- King George V Memorial Park
- Ragged Point Lighthouse
- Sam Lord's Castle and Beach
- St. Philip Parish Church
- Skeete's Bay
- Sunbury Plantation
- Three Houses Park
- Saint Martins Church

=== Parishes bordering Saint Philip ===
- Saint George - North-West
- Saint John - North
- Christ Church - West

== Politics ==
Saint Philip covers three geographical constituencies for the House of Assembly:

- St. Philip North
- St. Philip South
- St. Philip West
