= Transport in Barbados =

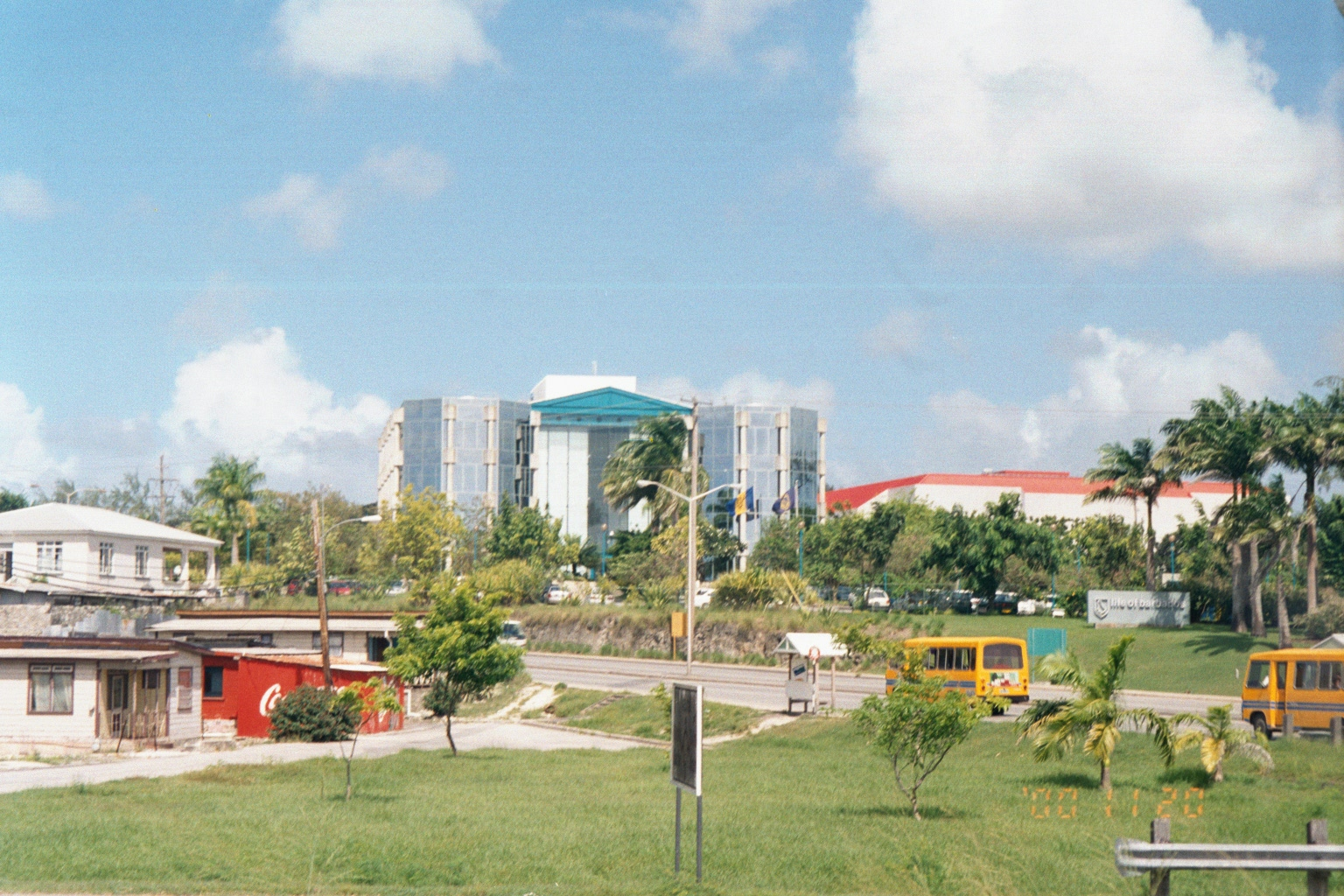
The two 1997 Hino ACME minibuses on the ABC Highway close to the Garfield Sobers Roundabout (sponsored by the then Mutual Life of Barbados; now Sagicor) on 20 November 2000.

Barbados is a relatively small country with a length of 21 miles (34 km) and a width of 14 miles (23 km). Barbados has 1,600 kilometres (990 mi) of public paved roads, two active marine ports in (Bridgetown Port and Port Saint Charles), remnants of a railway system, and one airport; the Sir Grantley Adams International Airport, located in Christ Church.

== Roadways ==
As a former British colony, Barbados was heavily influenced by the English culture and customs, which carried over into the infrastructure of Barbados. Similar to the driving habits in the United Kingdom, people in Barbados also drive on the left side of the road. Barbados has a very dependable highway system of main roads that stem from the country's capital, Bridgetown. The highways are identified by the numbers one to seven. H1 signifies the first highway that runs north. The numbering continues sequentially in a clockwise direction. The most popular highway throughout the island is the A. B. C. Highway (Adams/Barrow/Cummins).

Throughout the Barbados roadways, the most prominent traffic junctions are the two lane roundabouts. Like roundabouts seen in the United States vehicles in the inner most lane of the roundabout have the right of way, however, in Barbados the traffic moves in clockwise direction. The speed limit on all roads is 60 km/h (37 mph) unless otherwise posted. The speed limit on the ABC Highway and the Spring Garden Highway is 80 km/h (50 mph).

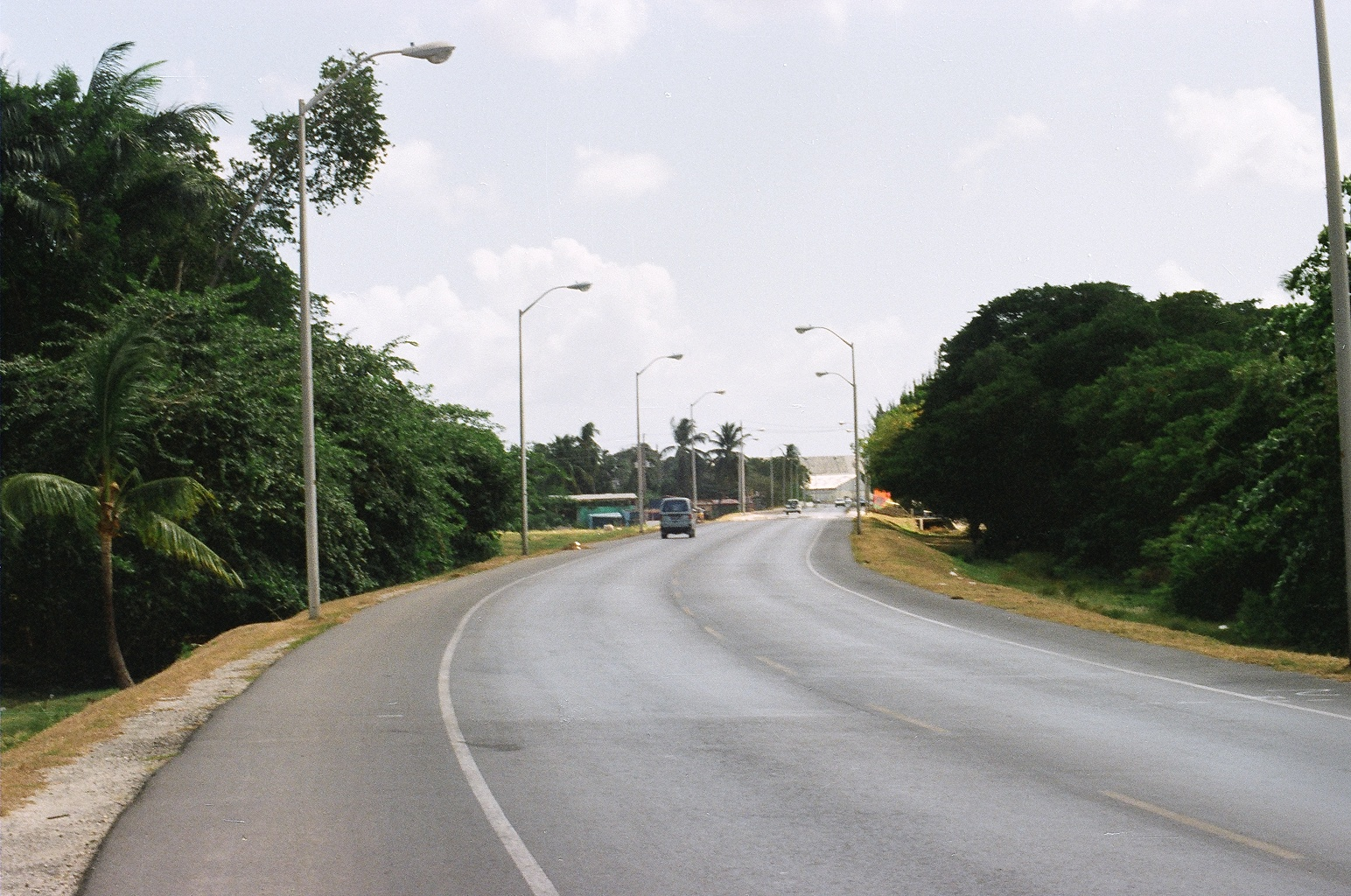
Spring Garden Highway close to Malibu Rum.

In 2010, an assessment released by the Economist Intelligence Unit (EIU) of the United Kingdom, ranked Barbados 6th in the world, and the top spot in the Western Hemisphere for road network density.

=== Road incidents ===
In terms of traffic and accidents, the 2010 EIU report found that Barbados had 63.1 vehicles per kilometre of road (101.5/mi) on the island. A rank that placed Barbados as 23rd globally for number of vehicles, by the total surface area of roads. For accident totals, Barbados placed 12th globally for road victims per 100,000 people; and 23rd globally (which was shared with The United States, Greece, Tunisia, Estonia and Georgia), for actual road fatalities per 100,000 people.

== Public transport ==
The Ministry of Transport & Works of Barbados oversees the affairs of the nation's roads, highways, and the public transport system. Public transport services in Barbados include buses, minibuses, share taxis (locally known as ZRs), taxis, and car rentals.

Vehicle registration plates are assigned to different types of vehicles; e.g. BM, B, ZR, Z & H, as shown below.

=== Buses (BM) ===
The bus services in Barbados are available to all, however locals are the predominant group that use the public buses. The Barbados Transport Board is a government organization that is responsible for bus transportation. The Board started as an organization on 24 August 1955 and has operated ever since. There are currently three hundred and four (304) buses in use around the island.

The government sets the fares (current adult fare (as of November 2025): $3.50 BBD). Adults have to pay the full fare, but the public bus is free for all children in school uniforms, students with an institution ID that are under the age of eighteen and senior citizens with Barbados ID. Public government buses run on an exact fare system and are unable to give change. Payment is made for each one-way journey on a single bus; no transfers are given.

Some bus services run on a direct route to their destinations, however many services require a connection through Bridgetown.

=== Minibuses (B) ===
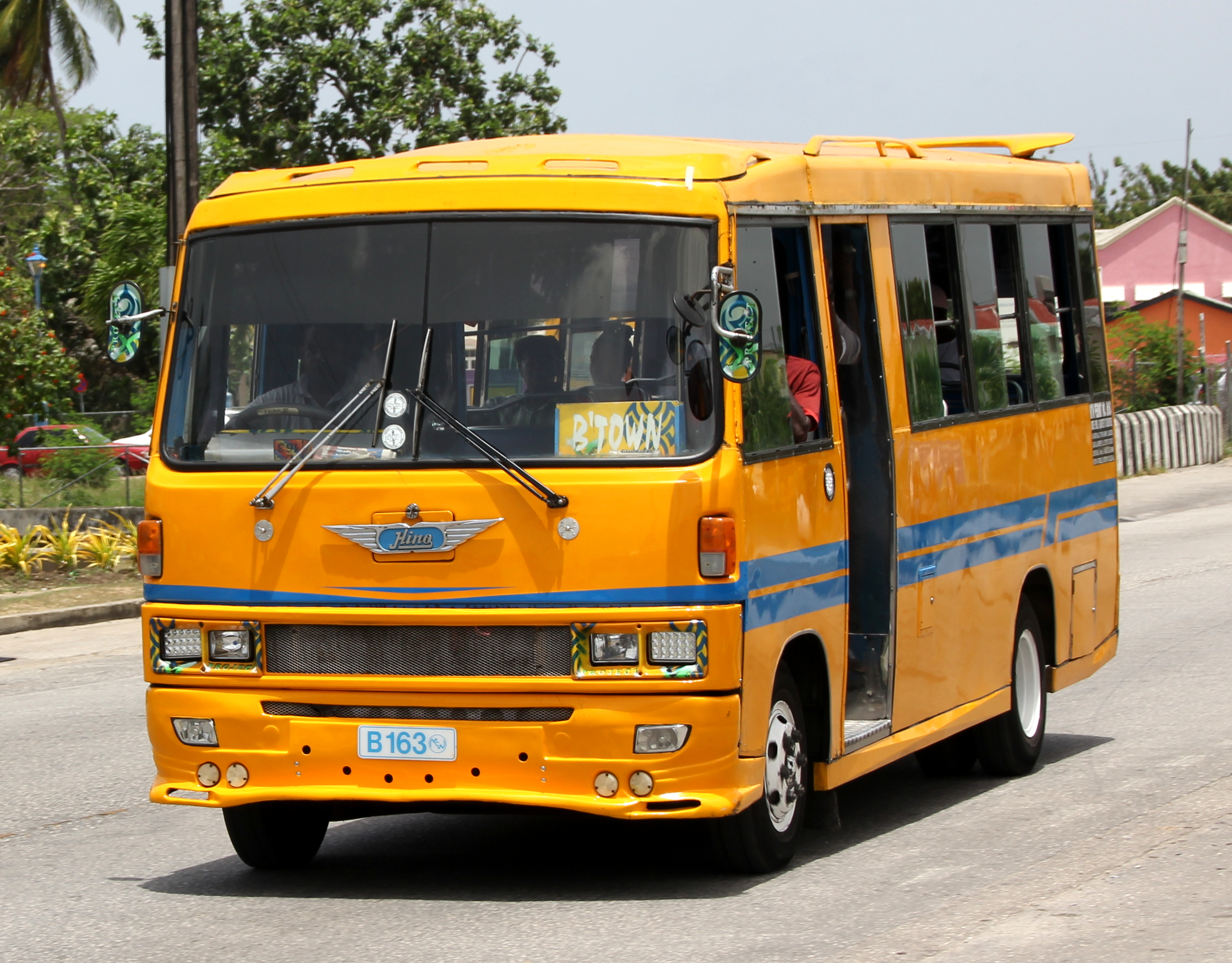
An ACME Hino Minibus in Speightstown, St. Peter, Barbados

There are also privately operated Mini- and Midibuses that are yellow with a blue stripe. They operate mainly on the west and south coastline. The most popular routes are Bridgetown–Speightstown and Bridgetown–Sam Lord's Castle.

Minibus fares are the same as government bus fares, but are usually able to give change.

=== ZR Buses (ZR) ===
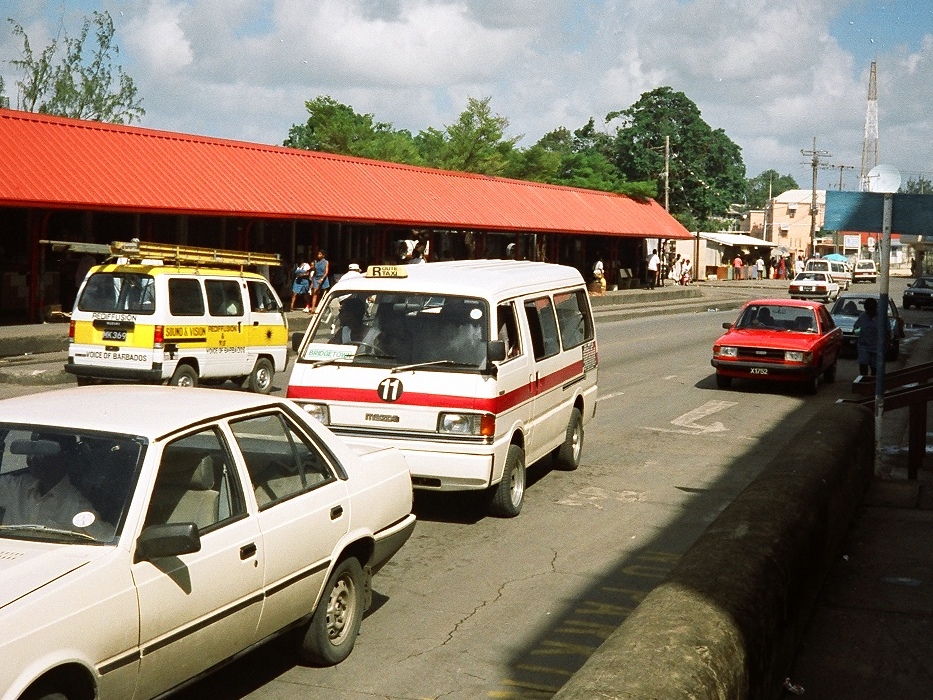
Typical ZR-bus with markings indicating that it serves the number 11 route.

The ZRs (pronounced "Zed-Rs"), are privately owned mini-vans that run on specific predetermined routes. They are recognized by their white exterior and maroon stripe down the side. ZRs are independently owned

ZR bus fares are the same as government bus fares, but are usually able to give change.

=== Taxis (Z) ===
Taxi services are also available to all. Taxis, similarly to those in the United States and other first world countries, provide transportation at a predetermined government rate. However, the fares are not metered, and it is advisable to agree on the cost before entering a taxi.

The mobile app pickUP Barbados is an Uber-like alternative specific to Barbados; it is used to call licensed-taxis, and provides the user with an estimate of the final fare.

=== Car rental (H) ===
Car rental in Barbados is provided through any of several local vehicle rental agencies; international rental-agencies are not well represented in Barbados.

They offer a wide variety of vehicles from luxury cars to vans, and also smaller open top cars.

Non-nationals who wish to drive in Barbados must be in possession of a Visitor Driving Permit issued by the Barbados Revenue Authority. Such permits are only issued to persons in possession of a valid foreign driving licence.

== Railway ==
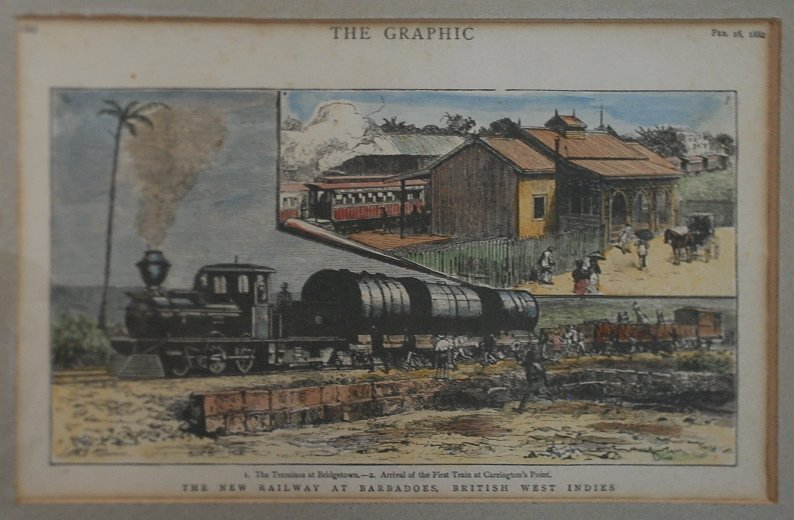
Barbados railway in The Graphic, 8 February 1882

A proposal for a railway system in Barbados was first made in 1845 by Britain. It was not until 1881 that construction began on the new 3 ft 6 in (1,067 mm) narrow-gauge Barbados Railway by an independent company for the purpose of transporting sugar cane across the island to the seaport of Bridgetown. It was later converted to 2 ft 6 in (762 mm) narrow gauge by Everard Calthrop.

From the early 20th century on, the railway system carried produce to and from factories to the city and also passengers to and from the city. However, complications arose. There was a lack of funding for the maintenance and upkeep of the system. Also, the poor designs of the tracks and cars posed a challenge against the high tides of the Atlantic Ocean. To keep the railway in use, the government of Barbados took over in 1916; however, it continued to decay. By 1937 the railway was shut down due to safety issues.

There are still remnants of the railway today and many can be seen by the coastlines. There is a marathon run & walk along the old route from Bridgetown to Carrington on the East Coast every year.

In 1881 a horse-drawn tramway, the Barbados Tramway Company, was constructed around Bridgetown by the Scottish railway engineer Robert Fairlie and ceased operations in 1925.

== Waterways ==
Barbados also provides ports for large cruise ships and transportation of goods into and out of the country. The main ports reside in Bridgetown, Saint Michael (Deep Water Harbour), and in Speightstown, St. Peter (the Port Charles Marina). These are regulated by the Barbados Port Authority. Large cruise ships dock at the Deep Water Harbour at the southwestern end of the island.

=== Boating ===
Boating to and from Barbados requires following all International and local laws. If arriving in Barbados it is important to remember that legally you must enter an approved port of entry, which means stopping by the Harbour-master first at Bridgetown. Laws also protect the coral reefs, and boaters should be careful not to drop anchor outside of areas approved by the government of Barbados in order to protect the corals and possibly other undersea infrastructure that might be present around the island.

Barbados currently no longer has the Schooner vessel that once operated between Speightstown and Bridgetown. However, in recent years, with many heavy traffic problems on the island, there have been calls to revive it.
