= 2013 national road cycling championships =

The 2013 national road cycling championships began in Australia with the time trial event (both men and women) on January 9.

== Jerseys ==
The winner of each national championship wears the national jersey in all their races for the next year in the respective discipline, apart from the World Championships and the Olympics, or unless they are wearing a category leader's jersey in a stage race. Most national champion jerseys tend to represent a country's flag or use the colours from it. Jerseys may also feature traditional sporting colours of a country that are not derived from a national flag, such as the green and gold on the jerseys of Australian national champions.

== 2013 champions ==
=== Men's Elite ===
| Country | Men's Elite Road Race Champion | Champion's Team at road | Men's Elite Time Trial Champion | Champion's Team at time |
|---|---|---|---|---|
| Albania | Redi Halilaj | | Redi Halilaj | |
| Algeria | Hichem Chabane | Vélo Club Sovac | Adil Barbari | |
| Andorra | | | Guy Diaz | |
| Angola | Igor Silva | | Igor Silva | |
| Antigua and Barbuda | André Simon | | Jyme Bridges | |
| Argentina | Gabriel Juárez | | Leandro Messineo | San Luis Somos Todos |
| Aruba | George Winterdal | | George Winterdal | |
| Australia | Luke Durbridge | Orica–GreenEDGE | Luke Durbridge | Orica–GreenEDGE |
| Austria | Riccardo Zoidl | Gourmetfein–Simplon | Matthias Brändle | IAM Cycling |
| Azerbaijan | Samir Jabrayilov | Synergy Baku | Elchin Asadov | Synergy Baku |
| Bahamas | Tracy Sweeting | | Jay Major (Note: Major finished second to New Zealand's Lee Farmer.) | |
| Barbados | Jamol Eastmond | | Russell Elcock | |
| Belarus | Andrei Krasilnikau | | Kanstantsin Sivtsov | Team Sky |
| Belgium | Stijn Devolder | RadioShack–Leopard | Kristof Vandewalle | Omega Pharma–Quick-Step |
| Belize | Byron Pope | | Edgar Arana | |
| Bermuda | Dominique Mayho | | Shannon Lawrence | |
| Bolivia | Gilber Zurita | | Basílio Ramos | |
| Bosnia and Herzegovina | Nikica Atlagić | | Nikica Atlagić | |
| Botswana | Bernardo Ayuso Erastus | | Bernardo Ayuso Erastus | |
| Brazil | Rodrigo Nascimento | | Luiz Carlos Tavares | |
| British Virgin Islands | Philippe Leroy (Note: Leroy finished second to the US Virgin Islands' Mark Defour.) | | Philippe Leroy | |
| Brunei | Bin Abd Hadizid Azmi | CCN | | |
| Bulgaria | Danail Petrov | Caja Rural–Seguros RGA | Spas Gyurov | |
| Burkina Faso | Hamidou Yameogo | | | |
| Canada | Zachary Bell | Champion System | Curtis Dearden | |
| Cayman Islands | | | Michele Smith | |
| Chile | Julio Garcés | | Gerson Zuñiga | |
| China | Shuang Shan | Hengxiang Cycling Team | Chen Libin (Note: Chen finished second to Hong Kong's Cheung King-Lok.) | |
| Colombia | Walter Pedraza | EPM–UNE | Carlos Ospina | |
| Democratic Republic of the Congo | | | | |
| Costa Rica | Paul Betancourt | | Henry Raabe | |
| Ivory Coast | Bassirou Konte | | | |
| Croatia | Robert Kišerlovski | RadioShack–Leopard | Matija Kvasina | Gourmetfein–Simplon |
| Cuba | | | | |
| Curaçao | Luis Javier Martínez | | Jendelo Paula | |
| Cyprus | Marios Athanasiadis | | Marios Athanasiadis | |
| Czech Republic | Jan Bárta | NetApp–Endura | Jan Bárta | NetApp–Endura |
| Denmark | Michael Mørkøv | Saxo–Tinkoff | Brian Vandborg | Cannondale |
| Djibouti | Mourad Ahmed (Note: Ahmed finished second to France's Alain Gouvernec.) | | | |
| Dominican Republic | Diego Milán | Inteja | Rodny Minier | |
| El Salvador | Rafael Carias | | Jimmy López | |
| Eritrea | Meron Teshome | | Metkel Kiflay | |
| Estonia | Rein Taaramäe | Cofidis | Tanel Kangert | Astana |
| Ethiopia | Tsgabu Grmay | MTN–Qhubeka | Tsgabu Grmay | MTN–Qhubeka |
| Finland | Jussi Veikkanen | FDJ.fr | Samuel Pökälä | |
| France | Arthur Vichot | FDJ | Sylvain Chavanel | Omega Pharma–Quick-Step |
| Gabon | Cédric Thaouta | | Ephrem Ekobena | |
| Georgia | Giorgi Nareklishvili | | Besik Gavasheli | |
| Germany | André Greipel | Lotto–Belisol | Tony Martin | Omega Pharma–Quick-Step |
| Greece | Ioannis Tamouridis | Euskaltel–Euskadi | Ioannis Tamouridis | Euskaltel–Euskadi |
| Guatemala | Julian Yac | | Manuel Rodas | |
| Guyana | Raynauth Jeffrey | | Raynauth Jeffrey | |
| Hong Kong | Cheung King-Wai | | Choi Ki Ho | |
| Hungary | Krisztián Lovassy | Utensilnord Ora24.eu | Gábor Fejes | |
| Iceland | Ingvar Ómarsson | | Hafsteinn Geirsson | |
| India | Shreedhar Savanur | | Arvind Panwar | |
| Indonesia | Aiman Cahyadi | | | |
| Iran | Ghader Mizbani | Tabriz Petrochemical Team | Behnam Khalili | Azad University Giant Team |
| Ireland | Matt Brammeier | Champion System | Michael Hutchinson | |
| Israel | Yuval Dolin | | Yoav Bear | |
| Italy | Ivan Santaromita | BMC Racing Team | Marco Pinotti | BMC Racing Team |
| Jamaica | Oshane Williams | | Peter Thompson | |
| Japan | Yukiya Arashiro | Team Europcar | Masatoshi Oba | C-Project |
| Kazakhstan | Alexsandr Dyachenko | Astana | Andrey Mizurov | Torku Şekerspor |
| Kyrgyzstan | Evgeny Vakker | Qinghai Tianyoude Cycling Team | Evgeny Vakker | Qinghai Tianyoude Cycling Team |
| Latvia | Aleksejs Saramotins | IAM Cycling | Gatis Smukulis | Team Katusha |
| Lesotho | Teboho Khantsi | | Phetetso Monese | |
| Lebanon | Hassan El Hajj | Athletico Bike Generation | Salah Ribah | |
| Liechtenstein | Gordian Banzer (Note: Banzer finished third, the race was won by Switzerland's Enea Cambianica from Switzerland.) | | Karlheinz Risch | |
| Lithuania | Tomas Vaitkus | Orica–GreenEDGE | Ignatas Konovalovas | MTN–Qhubeka |
| Luxembourg | Bob Jungels | RadioShack–Leopard | Bob Jungels | RadioShack–Leopard |
| Macedonia | Predrag Dimevski | | Zoran Ristovski | |
| Madagascar | Nambinina Randrianantenaina | | David Solofoson | |
| Malawi | Missi Kathumba | | | |
| Malaysia | Mohamed Mat Amin | Terengganu Cycling Team | Mohamed Lutfi | |
| Mali | Yacouba Togola | | | |
| Malta | Etienne Bonello | | Etienne Bonello | |
| Mauritius | Steward Pharmasse | | Yannick Lincoln | |
| Mongolia | | | | |
| Moldova | Alexandr Braico | Tușnad Cycling Team | Sergiu Cioban | Tușnad Cycling Team |
| Morocco | Abdelatif Saadoune | | Soufiane Haddi | |
| Mexico | Luis Enrique Lemus | Jelly Belly–Kenda | Bernardo Colex | |
| Namibia | Till Drobisch | MTN-Qhubeka-WCC Africa | Till Drobisch | MTN-Qhubeka-WCC Africa Team |
| Netherlands | Johnny Hoogerland | Vacansoleil–DCM | Lieuwe Westra | Vacansoleil–DCM |
| New Zealand | Hayden Roulston | RadioShack–Leopard | Joseph Cooper | Huon Salmon–Genesys Wealth Advisers |
| Nicaragua | | | | |
| Nigeria | Sodiq Ajibade | | | |
| Norway | Thor Hushovd | BMC Racing Team | Edvald Boasson Hagen | Team Sky |
| Panama | José Javier Rios | | Hector Zepeda | |
| Pakistan | Mohammad Sajid | | | |
| Paraguay | Ruben Armoa | | Gustavo Miño | |
| Peru | Cesar Mucha | | Royner Navarro | |
| Philippines | Rustom Lim | LBC-MVPSF Cycling Pilipinas | Ronald Oranza | LBC-MVPSF Cycling Pilipinas |
| Poland | Michał Kwiatkowski | Omega Pharma–Quick-Step | Maciej Bodnar | Cannondale |
| Portugal | Joni Brandão | Efapel–Glassdrive | Rui Costa | Movistar Team |
| Puerto Rico | Juan Martínez Adorno | | Eddy Sorriano | |
| Romania | Andrei Nechita | | Andrei Nechita (Note: Although Eduard-Michael Grosu recorded the best time for the time trial, he was eligible for Under-23 honours only.) | |
| Russia | Vladimir Isaichev | Team Katusha | Ilnur Zakarin | RusVelo |
| Rwanda | Gasore Haţegeka | | | |
| Saint Lucia | Kurt Maraj | | | |
| Saint Vincent and the Grenadines | Oneil George | | | |
| Saint Kitts and Nevis | | | | |
| San Marino | Luca Forcellini | | | |
| Serbia | Ivan Stević | Tușnad Cycling Team | Esad Hasanović | |
| Seychelles | Dominic Arrisol | | Dominic Arrisol | |
| Singapore | Low Ji Wen (Note: Low finished third to Netherlands' Tjarco Cuppens and Malaysia's Mohamed Ahmad.) | OCBC Singapore Continental Cycling Team | Ho Jun-Rong (Note: Ho finished third to Britain's Lee Rodgers and Netherlands' Tjarco Cuppens.) | OCBC Singapore Continental Cycling Team |
| Sierra Leone | Mohamed Thorley | | | |
| Slovakia | Peter Sagan | Cannondale | Peter Velits | Omega Pharma–Quick-Step |
| Slovenia | Luka Pibernik | Radenska | Klemen Štimulak | Adria Mobil |
| South Africa | Jay Thomson | MTN–Qhubeka | Daryl Impey | Orica–GreenEDGE |
| South Korea | Jung Ji-Min | KSPO | | |
| Spain | Jesús Herrada | Movistar Team | Jonathan Castroviejo | Movistar Team |
| Suriname | Moses Rickets | | Moses Rickets | |
| Sweden | Michael Olsson | Team People4you-Unaas Cycling | Gustav Larsson | IAM Cycling |
| Switzerland | Michael Schär | BMC Racing Team | Fabian Cancellara | RadioShack–Leopard |
| Taiwan | Feng Chun-kai | Champion System | Feng Chun-kai | Champion System |
| Tanzania | Emmanuel Mathias | | Hamisi Mkona | |
| Thailand | Nawuti Liphongyu | | | |
| Togo | | | | |
| Tunisia | Rafaâ Chtioui | | Rafaâ Chtioui | |
| Turkey | Nazim Bakırcı | Torku Şekerspor | Bekir Baki Akırşan | Torku Şekerspor |
| Trinidad and Tobago | Emile Abraham | | Emile Abraham | |
| Uganda | | | | |
| Ukraine | Denys Kostyuk | Kolss Cycling Team | Andriy Vasylyuk | Kolss Cycling Team |
| United Kingdom | Mark Cavendish | Omega Pharma–Quick-Step | Alex Dowsett | Movistar Team |
| United Arab Emirates | Yousif Banihammad | | Mohammed Al Murawwi | |
| Uruguay | Nicolas Arachichu | | Jorge Soto | |
| United States | Fred Rodriguez | Jelly Belly–Kenda | Tom Zirbel | Optum–Kelly Benefit Strategies |
| United States Virgin Islands | Mark Defour | | Mark Defour | |
| Uzbekistan | Muradjan Khalmuratov | RTS Racing Team | Muradjan Khalmuratov | RTS Racing Team |
| Venezuela | Edwin Becerra | | José Rujano | Vacansoleil–DCM |
| Vietnam | Thanh Tam Nguyen | | Minh Thuy Bui | |
| Zimbabwe | Bright Chipongo | | Bright Chipongo | |

=== Women's ===
| Country | Women's Elite Road Race Champion | Champion's team at time | Women's Elite Time Trial Champion | Champion's team at time |
|---|---|---|---|---|
| Albania | | | | |
| Algeria | | | | |
| Andorra | | | | |
| Angola | | | | |
| Antigua and Barbuda | Tamiko Butler | | Kevinia Francis | Road Runners Cycling Club |
| Argentina | | | | |
| Aruba | | | | |
| Australia | Gracie Elvin | Orica–AIS | Shara Gillow | Orica–AIS |
| Austria | Andrea Graus | Bigla Cycling Team | | |
| Azerbaijan | | | | |
| Bahamas | | | | |
| Barbados | | | | |
| Belarus | Alena Amialiusik | Be Pink | Alena Amialiusik | Be Pink |
| Belgium | Liesbet De Vocht | Rabobank-Liv Giant | Liesbet De Vocht | Rabobank-Liv Giant |
| Belize | | | | |
| Bermuda | | | | |
| Bolivia | | | | |
| Bosnia and Herzegovina | | | | |
| Botswana | | | | |
| Brazil | | | | |
| British Virgin Islands | | | | |
| Brunei | | | | |
| Bulgaria | | | | |
| Burkina Faso | | | | |
| Canada | Joëlle Numainville | Optum–Kelly Benefit Strategies | Joëlle Numainville | Optum–Kelly Benefit Strategies |
| Cayman Islands | | | | |
| China | | | | |
| China | | | | |
| Colombia | | | Sérika Mitchell Gulumá | |
| Democratic Republic of the Congo | | | | |
| Costa Rica | | | | |
| Ivory Coast | | | | |
| Croatia | | | | |
| Cuba | | | | |
| Curaçao | | | | |
| Cyprus | | | | |
| Czech Republic | Martina Sáblíková | | Martina Sáblíková | |
| Denmark | Kamilla Sofie Valin | Team Rytger | Annika Langvad | |
| Dominican Republic | | | Juana Fernández | Aro & Pedal |
| El Salvador | | | | |
| Eritrea | | | | |
| Estonia | | | Liisi Rist | S.C. Michela Fanini Rox |
| Finland | | | | |
| France | Élise Delzenne | Bourgogne–Pro Dialog | Pauline Ferrand-Prévot | Rabobank-Liv Giant |
| Gabon | | | | |
| Georgia | | | | |
| Germany | Trixi Worrack | Specialized–lululemon | Lisa Brennauer | Specialized–lululemon |
| Greece | | | Michali Tsavari Eleni | |
| Guatemala | | | | |
| Guyana | | | | |
| Hong Kong | | | | |
| Hungary | | | Mónika Király | |
| Iceland | | | | |
| Iran | | | | |
| Ireland | Melanie Späth | | Caroline Ryan | |
| Israel | | | | |
| Italy | | | Tatiana Guderzo | MCipollini–Giordana |
| Jamaica | | | | |
| Japan | Eri Yonamine | Team Forza | Eri Yonamine | Team Forza |
| Kazakhstan | | | | |
| Kyrgyzstan | | | | |
| Latvia | | | Dana Rožlapa | |
| Lebanon | | | | |
| Liechtenstein | | | | |
| Lithuania | Agnė Šilinytė | Pasta Zara–Cogeas | Inga Čilvinaitė | Pasta Zara–Cogeas |
| Luxembourg | | | Christine Majerus | Sengers Ladies Cycling Team |
| Macedonia | | | | |
| Madagascar | | | | |
| Malaysia | | | | |
| Mali | | | | |
| Malta | | | | |
| Mauritius | | | | |
| Mongolia | | | | |
| Moldova | | | | |
| Morocco | | | | |
| Mexico | | | Íngrid Drexel | Pasta Zara–Cogeas |
| Namibia | | | | |
| Netherlands details (road race) details (time trial) | Lucinda Brand | Rabobank-Liv Giant | Ellen van Dijk | Specialized–lululemon |
| New Zealand | Courteney Lowe | Optum–Kelly Benefit Strategies | Linda Villumsen | Wiggle–Honda |
| Nicaragua | | | | |
| Norway | Cecilie Gotaas Johnsen | Team Hitec Products | Tina Andreassen | |
| Panama | | | | |
| Pakistan | | | | |
| Paraguay | | | | |
| Peru | | | | |
| Poland | | | Katarzyna Pawłowska | GSD Gestion-Kallisto |
| Portugal | | | | |
| Puerto Rico | | | | |
| Romania | | | | |
| Russia | Svetlana Stolbova | Team Pratomagno Women | Tatiana Antoshina | MCipollini–Giordana |
| Rwanda | | | | |
| Saint Lucia | | | | |
| Saint Vincent and the Grenadines | Niesha Alexander | | | |
| Saint Kitts and Nevis | | | | |
| Serbia | Ivana Kostic | | Maja Markovic | |
| Singapore | | | | |
| Slovakia | | | Alžbeta Pavlendová | |
| Slovenia | | | | |
| South Africa | | | Ashleigh Moolman Pasio | Lotto–Belisol Ladies |
| South Korea | Na Ah-Reum | | | |
| Spain | Ane Santesteban | Bizkaia–Durango | Anna Sanchis | Bizkaia–Durango |
| Suriname | | | | |
| Sweden | Emilia Fahlin | Team Hitec Products | Emma Johansson | Orica–AIS |
| Switzerland | Doris Schweizer | Be Pink | Patricia Schwager | Faren–Let's Go Finland |
| Taiwan | | | | |
| Thailand | | | | |
| Togo | | | | |
| Tunisia | | | | |
| Turkey | Merve Demircioğlu | Sakarya Telekom | Semra Yetiş | Ankara GSK |
| Trinidad and Tobago | | | | |
| Uganda | | | | |
| Ukraine | Yelyzaveta Oshurkova | | | |
| United Kingdom | Lizzie Armitstead | Boels–Dolmans | Joanna Rowsell | Wiggle–Honda |
| United Arab Emirates | | | | |
| Uruguay | | | | |
| United States | Jade Wilcoxson | Optum–Kelly Benefit Strategies | Carmen Small | Specialized–lululemon |
| United States Virgin Islands | | | | |
| Uzbekistan | | | | |
| Venezuela | | | Danielys García | |
| Zimbabwe | | | | |

== See also ==
- 2013 in men's road cycling
- 2013 in women's road cycling
