= Louis Ginglo =

Canadian ocean rower

Louis Ginglo (born 13 February 1965 in Hamilton, Ontario) was the first Canadian rower to cross the Atlantic Ocean single-handedly from east to west.

He began his solo voyage on 20 January 2004 from San Sebastián de La Gomera, Canary Islands. The crossing was completed when he docked at Port Saint Charles, Barbados, on 20 May 2004. His journey of 4,678 kilometres (2,907 mi) took 120 days. As a competitor in the Ocean Rowing Society’s 2004 Atlantic Rowing Regatta, Ginglo took his 8m boat, Moose On The Move, fully equipped for an unassisted journey.

Despite little previous experience in ocean rowing, and a lifetime spent working in corporate finance, he made the crossing successfully.
