= Barbados Tramway Company =

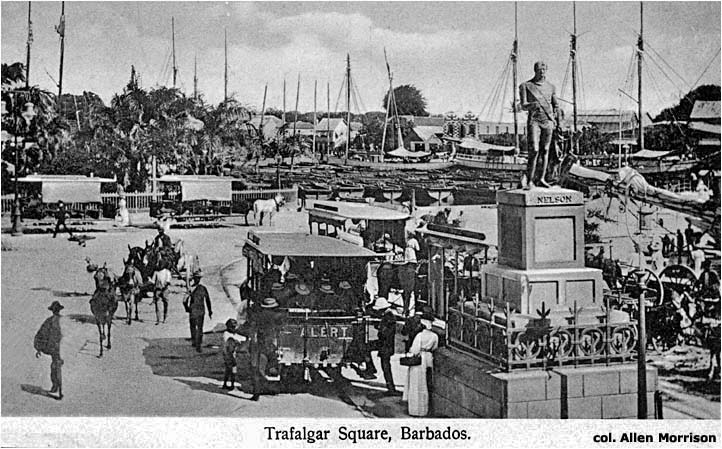
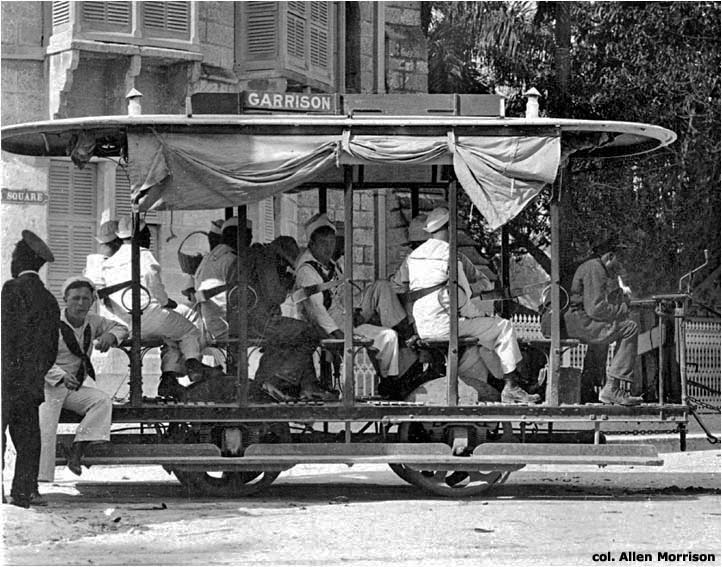
- Bridgetown Trams at Trafalgar Square Tram in Bridgetown, Barbados

Technical
- Line length: 10 mi (16 km)
- Track gauge: Unknown but probably 1,067 mm (3 ft 6 in)

The Barbados Tramway Company operated a network of horse-drawn narrow gauge trams in Bridgetown, capital of Barbados, with an unknown gauge of approximately 1,067 mm (3 ft 6 in)).

== History ==
In 1882 a horse-drawn tramway, the Barbados Tramway Company, was constructed in Bridgetown by an engineer named Fairlie.

Fairlie obtained permission to construct and operate a street railway in Bridgetown, and registered Barbados Tramway Company on 5 December 1882. The Barbados Tramway Company opened the first 2 mi (3.2 km) of its St. Lawrence tram line, as far as Hastings Rocks, on 5 December 1885. The main hub was near Nelson's Column at Trafalgar Square. The line toward south crossed the harbour in the Constitution River on Chamberlain Bridge one block (about 700 ft (210 m)) away from the terminus of the Barbados Railway, a narrow gauge steam railway that opened on 20 October 1881.

The tram network consisted of five lines, ending in Fontabelle, Belfield, Hindsbury, Belleville and St. Lawrence. The network had up to 10 mi (16 km) of track. The Barbados Tramway Company operated up to 25 horse-drawn tramcars. Instead of numbers the trams had names, such as ACTIVE, ALERT and JUBILEE.

Gasoline-powered buses became an attractive alternative for passengers starting in 1907. There were several bus companies by 1908 outcompeting the slower trams, thus the tramway was sold to U.S. investors in 1910 and renamed to Bridgetown Tramway Company. The American investors initially wanted to build extensions north to Speightstown and south to Oistins Town, but this did not happen and the tramway ceased operation in 1925.

== See also ==
- Barbados Railway
- St. Nicholas Abbey Heritage Railway
- Rail transport in Barbados
