= 2007 Woodvale Atlantic Rowing Race =

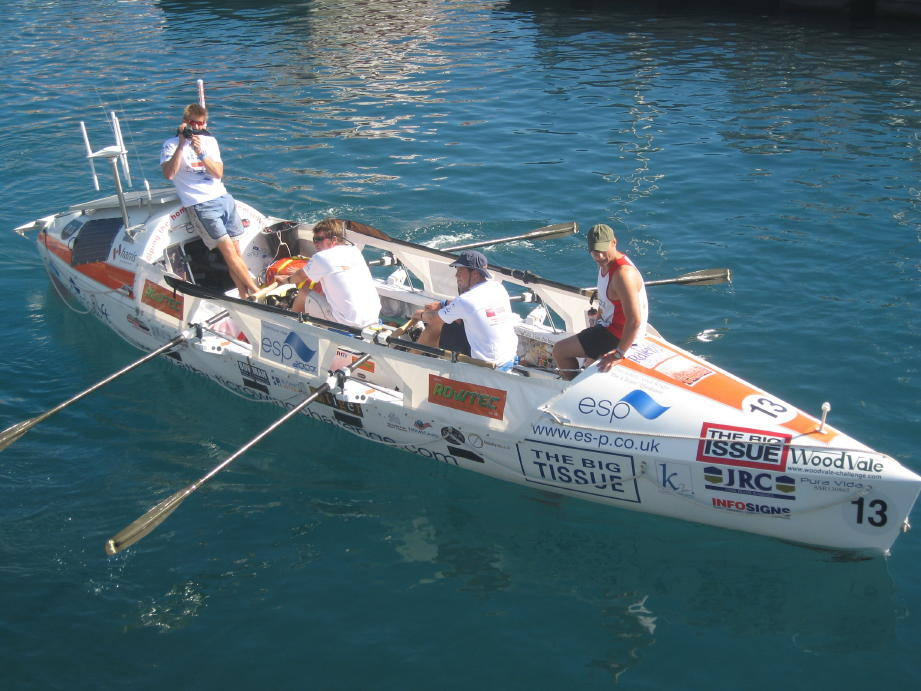
Pura Vida at Start of 2007 Race

The 2007 race left San Sebastián de la Gomera on Sunday 2 December 2007 with the finish in English Harbour, Antigua, on the same course as the 2005 race. 2 singles, 15 pairs and 5 fours started the race, with a six-crew boat starting slightly later. One pair "Titanic Challenge" and one Four "Move Ahead II" retired early on.

== Line Honours ==
The first to finish, "Pura Vida", was a four crewed by John Cecil-Wright, Robbie Grant, Tom Harvey & Carl Theakston (all GB) finished at 14.52 UTC on 19 January 2008, taking 48 Days, 2 hours, 52 minutes.

The first pair, "Gquma Challenger" (Gquma meaning"breaking wave"), was crewed by South Africans Bill Godfrey & Peter Van Kets. They finished at 00.15 UTC on 22 January, with the second pair, "No Fear", crewed by John Csehi & Nick Histon (both GB) finishing just 5 hours and 50 minutes later, after over 50 days at sea.

The next to finish, "Unfinished Business", comprised four women—Jo Davies (GB), Sarah Kessans (US), Emily Kohl (US) & Tara Remington (NZ)—who had all competed in the 2005 race but had failed to finish due to injury, capsizing or sinking. They finished on 23 January in a time of 51 days, 16 hours and 31 minutes, a new female-fours record for an Atlantic crossing. The women then renamed the boat "Finished Business".

Fifth to finish, "Go Commando", was crewed by Ben Gaffney and Orlando Rogers (both GB). They finished in 54 days, 8 hours and 39 minutes. Their row, and the preparation for it, were the subject of a 1-hour TV documentary shown on ITV4 (UK) on 7 March 2008. Go Commando made a last minute dash and pulled away from "The Reason Why" crewed by Steve Gardner & Paul Harris (both GB), who finished 3 hours 24 minutes later, the sixth to finish.

Having started much later, "Oyster Shack Ocean Challenger" came in next. This was a "six" boat, although it was eventually rowed by five. Although "Oyster Shack" accompanied the race, it was a record attempt and not a race entrant and so was not placed (see below).

The seventh to finish, "Pendovey Swift" crewed by Ian Andrews and Joss Elliott (both GB), finished in 62 days, 20 hours and 56 Minutes. Next was "Mission Atlantic", a four comprising Andy Ehrhart, Justin Ellis, Mark Hefford and Nick Young (all GB) who completed the crossing in 65 days, 0 hours and 28 minutes although they were later disqualified (See "Race Positions" below). In eighth place came "Komale" with James Burge & Niall McCann (both GB) who took the start line, but immediately returned to San Sebastian due to a medical problem. They eventually started 2 days late and had a crossing time of 63 days, 2 hours and 5 minutes, but a race time 2 days longer than this.

"Jaydubyoo", crewed by brothers Andrew and Joseph Jordon-White (both GB), came ninth in 65 days, 19 hours 43 minutes—narrowly beating "Row of Life", crewed by Angela Madsen (USA) & Franck Festor (France), who finished in 65 days, 23 hours 24 minutes. Angela, a paraplegic, and Franck, a leg amputee, had originally planned to row the Atlantic in a differently-abled four, "Differents?" in 2006 but, when this was cancelled, agreed to row as a pair in order to "inspire, motivate and effect positive changes in the lives of those who are born differently abled and those who suffer serious trauma in their lives." "Differents?" made its first Atlantic crossing in 1997 and competed in the 2005 race as "Bout de Vie".

Eleventh was "Ocean Summit", crewed by Neil Hunter & Scott McNaughton (both GB), in 66 days, 10 hours and 10 minutes. Twelfth was "Pygram" with Fabien Decourt and Benoit Dusser (both France) in 72 Days, 3 hours and 3 minutes. "Atlantic Jack", crewed by Catherine Allaway (GB) & Margaret Bowling (Australia) came in only 2 hours 11 minutes later, although they were disqualified from the race (See "Race Positions" below). "C2", crewed by Andy Watson (GB) and Ian McGlade (Ireland), also finished the same day in 73 days 10 hours and 45 minutes, but were relegated 2 places for using emergency drinking water.

"Silver Cloud", crewed by Clair Desborough, Sarah Duff, Rachel Flanders & Fiona Waller (all GB), finished in 74 Days 1 hour and 3 minutes, putting them thirteenth in the race and making 17-year-old Rachel Flanders the youngest person to have rowed an ocean.

The two Solos both came in on 16 February, "1 Charmed Life" rowed by Peter Collett (GB/Australia) finished in 75 Days, 23 hours, 46 minutes in 14th place, and the "Spirit of Fernie" rowed by Paul Attalla (Canada) in 76 Days 7 Hours and 46 minutes was placed 16th by the demoting of C2.

"Barbara Ivy", crewed by Linda Griesel & Rachel Smith (both GB) finished 17th in 76 days 7 hours and 46 minutes and the final finisher was "Dream Maker" with Elin Haf Davies & Herdip Sidhu (both GB) in 77 days, 7 hours, 37 minutes

== Race Positions ==
Most finishing positions were unaltered, "C2" was relegated 2 places, from thirteenth to fifteenth, for using over 110 litres of their emergency drinking water

Two boats which completed the crossing were disqualified from the race for receiving assistance en route. These were "Mission Atlantic", who were supplied with food, and "Atlantic Jack", who received food and a rudder-pin.

== Oyster Shack ==
"Oyster Shack Ocean Challenger" was attempting to beat the record for the fastest rowed Atlantic crossing of 35 days 8 Hours and 30 minutes, set in 1992 by "La Mondiale" with a French crew of 11. The same "La Mondiale", this time with a British & Irish crew of fourteen, and an American rowed tri-maran "Orca", with a crew of four, set out from Puerto de Mogán, Gran Canaria, for Port St. Charles, Barbados, at about the same time—both trying to beat the record.

"Oyster Shack" had a late crew change and delayed their start until 5 December 2007, 2 days after the race started, hoping for better weather. Unfortunately the new crew member, Andy Morris, injured his knee and the attempt was abandoned after 22 hours with the boat towed to El Hierro. Having returned to La Gomera by ferry the boat was repaired and the five remaining crew members: Simon Chalk, Ian Couch, George Oliver, Mike Martin & Ben Thackwray (all GB) decided to try without a replacement.

Having waited for favourable weather again the second attempt left on 23 December 2007. Initially they had good weather and made good time, however, the rudder sheared off, the weather deteriorated and the repaired rudder broke again. They finally arrived in 37 days 5 hours and 39 minutes failing to beat the record. In the meantime "La Mondiale" had beaten the record with a time of 33 Days 7 hours and 30 minutes. This was the first crossing by a crew of five and the also the world record for fastest time from Canaries to Antigua in a row boat; as the four faster Atlantic crossings have all been to Barbados (which is subject to more favourable mid Atlantic currents).
