= Bridgetown Heliport =

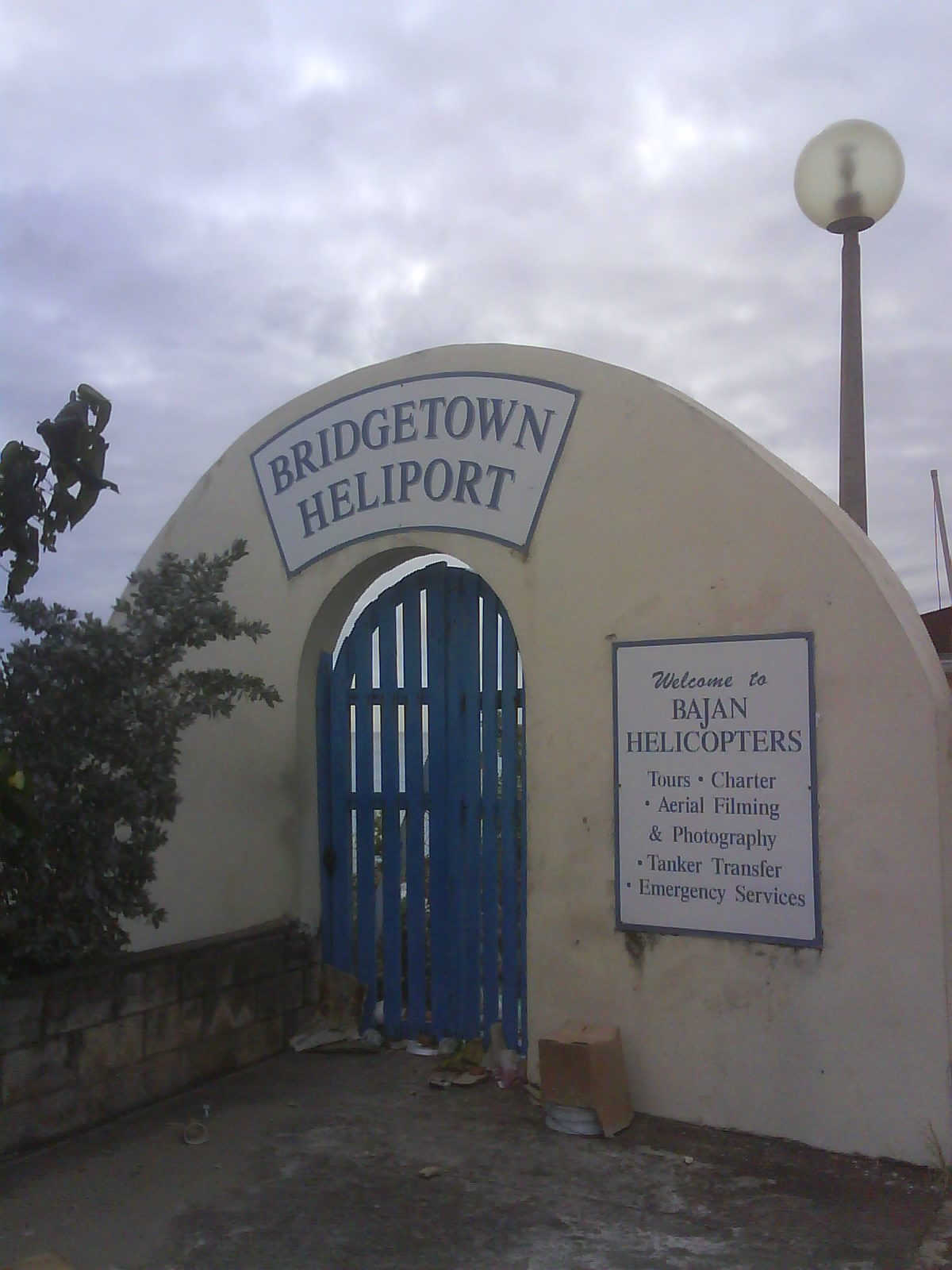
- IATA: none; ICAO: TBPO

Summary
- Airport type: Private
- Serves: Bridgetown
- Location: Bridgetown
- Coordinates: 13°05′45″N 059°37′07″W

Map
- Location in Barbados

Runways
Direction	Length		Surface
Direction	m	ft	Surface
			Asphalt

Bridgetown Heliport, (ICAO: TBPO) is found in the city of Bridgetown, Saint Michael on the island of Barbados. The heliport is situated on the shores of Carlisle Bay roughly 12.9 km (8.0 mi) from Sir Grantley Adams International Airport in neighbouring Christ Church.

The heliport was formerly managed by Bajan Helicopters Ltd. Its customers and utilisations included: Government departments, oil companies, shipping lines, cruise lines, public utility companies and emergency Medical evacuations.

Occasionally Bajan Helicopters operated chartered flights to other various destinations covering South America and the Eastern Caribbean. Typically these flights were to the islands of Antigua, Grenada, Guadeloupe, Martinique, Montserrat, Saint Kitts, Saint Lucia, Sint Maarten, and Saint Vincent.

Upscale holidaying clientele in Barbados had also come to rely on Bajan Helicopters to take them to the heliport at the Port Saint Charles marina, the Sandy Lane Hotel, and the Royal Westmoreland Resort upon arrival at the Grantley Adams International Airport.

== See also ==
- List of airports in Barbados
