= Atlantic Rowing Race =

Ocean rowing race

The Atlantic Rowing Race is an ocean rowing race from the Canary Islands to the West Indies, a distance of approximately 2,550 nm (2,930 statute miles or 4,700 km). The race was founded in 1997 by Sir Chay Blyth with subsequent races roughly every two years since. The early races were run by Challenge Business Ltd. until the race was bought by Woodvale Events Ltd., managed by Simon Chalk, in October 2003. In May 2012, Atlantic Campaigns SL, managed by Carsten Heron Olsen bought the rights to the Atlantic Rowing Race, now called The "Talisker Whisky Atlantic Challenge" – The World's Toughest Row. Since 2015, the race has been held annually starting each December.

== 1997 – Port St. Charles Rowing Race ==
- Departure Port: Playa San Juan, Tenerife
- Arrival Port: Port St. Charles, Barbados
- Race Start: 12 October 1997
- Teams Starting: 30
- Teams Finishing: 24
- Categories: Pairs
- Winning Boat: Kiwi Challenge
  - Team Name: Kiwi Challenge
  - Country: New Zealand
  - Rowers: Rob Hamill and Phil Stubbs
  - Time: 41 days, 2 hours, and 55 minutes

== 2001 – Ward Evans Atlantic Rowing Race ==
- Departure Port: Playa San Juan, Tenerife
- Arrival Port: Port St. Charles, Barbados
- Race Start: 7 October 2001
- Teams Starting: 36
- Teams Finishing: 33
- Categories: Pairs
- Winning Boat: Telecom Challenge 1
  - Team Name: Telecom Challenge 1
  - Country: New Zealand
  - Rowers: Matt Goodman and Steve Westlake
  - Time: 42 days, 4 hours, and 3 minutes

== 2003 – Woodvale Atlantic Rowing Race ==
- Departure Port: San Sebastián de la Gomera
- Arrival Port: Port St. Charles, Barbados
- Race Start: 19 October 2003
- Teams Starting: 17
- Teams Finishing: 14
- Categories: Singles, Pairs
- Winning Boat:
  - Team Name: Holiday Shoppe Challenge
  - Country: New Zealand
  - Rowers: James Fitzgerald and Kevin Biggar
  - Time: 40 days, 4 hours, and 3 minutes

== 2004 – Ocean Rowing Society Atlantic Rowing Regatta ==
- Departure Port: San Sebastián de la Gomera
- Arrival Port: English Harbour, Antigua
- Race Start: 20 January 2004
- Teams Starting: 13
- Teams Finishing: 12
- Categories: Singles, Pairs, 1x Four
- Winning Boat:
  - Team Name: Atlantic-4
  - Country: United Kingdom
  - Rowers: David Martin, Neil Wightwick, Glynn Coupland, and George Simpson
  - Time: 49 days, 14 hours, 21 minutes

== 2005 – Woodvale Atlantic Rowing Race ==
- Departure Port: San Sebastián de la Gomera
- Arrival Port: English Harbour, Antigua
- Race Start: 30 November 2005
- Teams Starting: 27
- Teams Finishing: 20
- Categories: Singles, Pairs, Fours
- Winning Boat:
  - Team Name: C2
  - Country: United Kingdom
  - Rowers: Clint Evans and Chris Andrews
  - Time: 52 days, 2 hours, 10 minutes

For more race details, see: 2005 Woodvale Atlantic Rowing Race

== 2007 – Woodvale Atlantic Rowing Race ==
- Departure Port: San Sebastián de la Gomera
- Arrival Port: English Harbour, Antigua
- Race Start: 2 December 2007
- Teams Starting: 22
- Teams Finishing: 20
- Categories: Singles, Pairs, Fours
- Winning Boat:
  - Team Name: Pure Vida
  - Country: United Kingdom
  - Rowers: John Cecil-Wright, Robbie Grant, Tom Harvey, and Carl Theakston
  - Time: 48 Days, 2 hours, 52 minutes

For more race details, see: 2007 Woodvale Atlantic Rowing Race

== 2009/2010 – Woodvale Atlantic Rowing Race ==
- Departure Port: San Sebastián de la Gomera
- Arrival Port: Antigua
- Race Start: 4 January 2010 (Race delayed by a month)
- Teams Starting: 7 Solos, 20 Pairs, 3 Fours, 1 team of 12
- Teams Finishing: 20
- Categories: Singles, Pairs, Fours
- Winning Boat: JJ (Insure & Go)
  - Team Name: Charlie Pitcher
  - Country: United Kingdom
  - Rowers: Charlie Pitcher
  - Time: 52 days 6 hours and 47 minutes

== 2011 – Talisker Whisky Atlantic Challenge ==
- Departure Port: San Sebastián de la Gomera
- Arrival Port: Port St. Charles, Barbados
- Race Start: 5 December 2011
- Teams Starting: 17
- Teams Finishing: 11
- Categories: Singles, Doubles, Fours, Fives, and Sixes
- Winning Boat: Box No 8
  - Team Name: Box No 8
  - Country: United Kingdom
  - Rowers: Toby Iles and Nick Moore
  - Time: 40 days, 9 hours, 15 minutes

== 2013 – Talisker Whisky Atlantic Challenge ==
- Departure Port: San Sebastián de la Gomera
- Arrival Port: Antigua
- Race Start: 4 December 2013
- Teams Starting: 17
- Teams Finishing: 11
- Categories: Singles, Doubles, Trios, Fours, Fives
- Winning Boat: Locura
  - Team Name: Team Locura
  - Country: United Kingdom
  - Rowers: Tom Salt and Mike Burton
  - Time: 40 days, 2 hours, 38 minutes, 54 seconds

== 2015 – Talisker Whisky Atlantic Challenge ==
- Departure Port: San Sebastián de la Gomera
- Arrival Port: Antigua
- Race Start: 20 December 2015
- Teams Starting: 26
- Teams Finishing: 26
- Categories: Singles, Doubles, Trios, Fours
- Winning Boat: Ocean Reunion
  - Team Name: Ocean Reunion
  - Country: United Kingdom
  - Rowers: Angus Collins, Gus Barton, Joe Barnett, Jack Mayhew
  - Time: 37 days, 9 hours, 12 minutes

== 2016 – Talisker Whisky Atlantic Challenge ==
- Departure Port: San Sebastián de la Gomera
- Arrival Port: Antigua
- Race Start: 14 December 2016
- Teams Starting: 12
- Teams Finishing: 11
- Categories: Singles, Doubles, Trios, Fours
- Winning Boat: American Spirit
  - Team Name: Latitude 35
  - Country: Mixed (United States and United Kingdom)
  - Rowers: Jason Caldwell (USA), Matthew Brown (USA), Angus Collins (UK), Alex Simpson (UK)
  - Time: 35 days, 14 hours, 3 minutes (New Race Record)

== 2017 – Talisker Whisky Atlantic Challenge ==
- Departure Port: San Sebastián de la Gomera
- Arrival Port: English Harbour, Antigua
- Race Start: 14 December 2017
- Teams Starting: 26
- Teams Finishing: 22
- Categories: Singles, Doubles, Trios, Fours
- Winning Boat: Aegir
  - Team Name: The Four Oarsmen
  - Country: United Kingdom
  - Rowers: George Biggar, Peter Robinson, Stuart Watts, Richard Taylor
  - Time: 29 days, 14 hours, 34 minutes (New Race Record)

== 2018 – Talisker Whisky Atlantic Challenge ==
- Departure Port: San Sebastián de la Gomera
- Arrival Port: English Harbour, Antigua
- Race Start: 12 December 2018
- Teams Starting: 28
- Teams Finishing: 27
- Categories: Singles, Doubles, Trios, Fours, Fives
- Winning Boat: Rose
  - Team Name: Dutch Atlantic Four
  - Country: Netherlands
  - Rowers: Marcel Ates, Erik Koning, David de Bruijn, Bart Adema
  - Time: 34 days, 12 hours, 9 minutes

== 2019 – Talisker Whisky Atlantic Challenge ==
- Departure Port: San Sebastián de la Gomera
- Arrival Port: English Harbour, Antigua
- Race Start: 12 December 2019
- Teams Starting: 35
- Teams Finishing: 35
- Categories: Singles, Doubles, Trios, Fours, Fives
- Winning Boat:
  - Team Name: Fortitude IV
  - Country: United Kingdom
  - Rowers: Oliver Palmer, Tom Foley, Hugh Gilum, Max Breet
  - Time: 32 days, 12 hours, 35 minutes, 2 seconds 2019 – Talisker Whisky Atlantic Challenge
  - Diversity: In 2019 the first Black team and the first Caribbean team completed the challenge. The team was composed of Christal Clashing, Samara Emmanuel, Kevinia Francis and Elvira Bell-Bailey. Three of the team, named Antigua Island Girls, went on to compete in and finish the 2023 inaugural World's Toughest Row-Pacific, using the funds raised to establish a home for girls in conflict with the law.

== 2021 – Talisker Whisky Atlantic Challenge ==
- Departure Port: San Sebastián de la Gomera
- Arrival Port: English Harbour, Antigua
- Race Start: 12 December 2021
- Teams Starting: 36
- Teams Finishing: 35
- Categories: Singles, Doubles, Trios, Fours, Fives
- Winning Boat:
  - Team Name: SWISS RAW
  - Country: Switzerland
  - Rowers: Roman Moeckli, Ingvar Groza, Samuel Widmer, Jan Hurni
  - Time: 34 days, 23 hours, 42 minutes 2021 – Talisker Whisky Atlantic Challenge

== Current Race Records ==
Ocean rowing records for The Atlantic Rowing Race are maintained by Ocean Rowing Stats.

Category	Race Year	Time	Rowers	Team	Special Note
Traditional Single	2015	52 days, 3 hr, 26 min	Matteo Perucchini	Sogno Atlantico	
Traditional Double	2003	40 days, 4 hr, 3 min	James Fitzgerald; Kevin Biggar	Holiday Shoppe Challenge	
Traditional Trio	2016	51 days, 1 hr, 13 min	Stuart Connacher; Charl Gale; Wayne Johnson	Facing It	
Traditional Four					
Concept Single	2016	49 days, 11 hr, 37 min	Gavan Hennigan	Soulogav	
Concept Double	2019	37 days, 7 hr, 54 min	Dave Spelman; Max Thorpe	Resilient:X	Guinness World Record for the fastest row across the Atlantic E-W by a duo
Concept Trio	12 Dec 2022 - 16 Jan 2023	35 days, 2 hr, 33 min	Gareth Keighley; Charles Taylor; Aaron Kneebone	Dark Trio	
Concept Four	2017	29 days, 14 hr, 34 min	Peter Robinson; Stuart Watts; George Biggar; Richard Taylor	The Four Oarsmen	Guinness World Record for the fastest row across the Atlantic E-W by a four person team
Female Trio	2023	40 days, 10 hr, 51 min	Bobbie Mellor; Katherine Antrobus; Hatty Carder	WaveBreakers	Fastest Female Trio to row across the Atlantic Ocean
Women's Solo	2024	44 days, 4 hours, 47 min	Liz Wardley		15 days faster than previous record
