= Barbados Railway =

Coordinates: 13.095926°N 59.612263°W

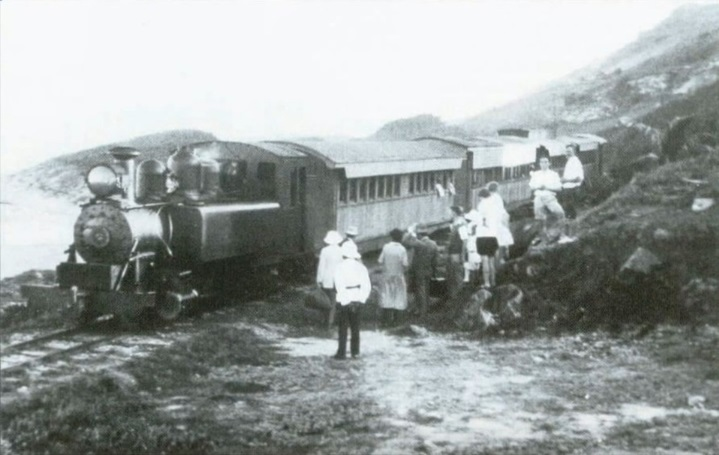
- Barbados Railway near Barclays Park

Technical
- Line length: 24 mi (39 km)
- Track gauge: until 1898: 1,067 mm (3 ft 6 in); from 1898: 762 mm (2 ft 6 in)
Route map
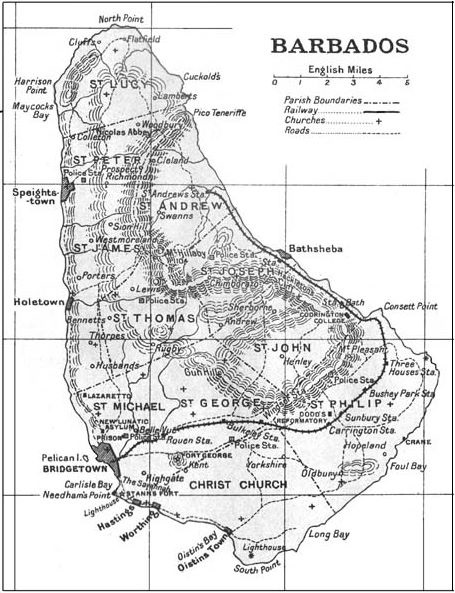
A. Aspinall: The Pocket Guide to the West Indies, 1923

The Barbados Railway was a 38.6-kilometre-long (24.0 mi) 1,067 mm (3 ft 6 in) narrow-gauge railway on Barbados that was later converted to 762 mm (2 ft 6 in). It had 98 bridges, very tight radii and a steep incline. It was used from 1883 to 1937, after it had gone several times through financial difficulties.

== History ==
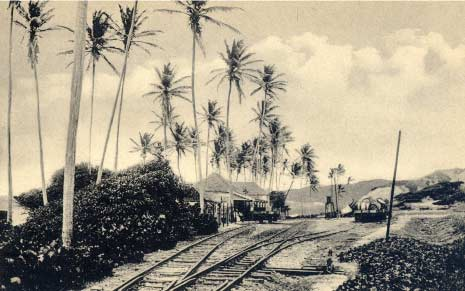
Bath station of the Barbados Railway

The governor of Barbados turned the first sod for building the narrow gauge track on Saturday, 23 June 1877. The line's first section from Bridgetown to Carrington was inaugurated on 20 October 1881. The first train needed approximately 40 minutes for the one-way trip.

After derailments, the passenger trains were temporarily cancelled after one week, as additional construction work had to be done. The public was informed that up to then only trials had been carried out, to test the track and to establish, how well the track could be used. Additional work was required at the terminus, and some sections of the track had to be levelled.

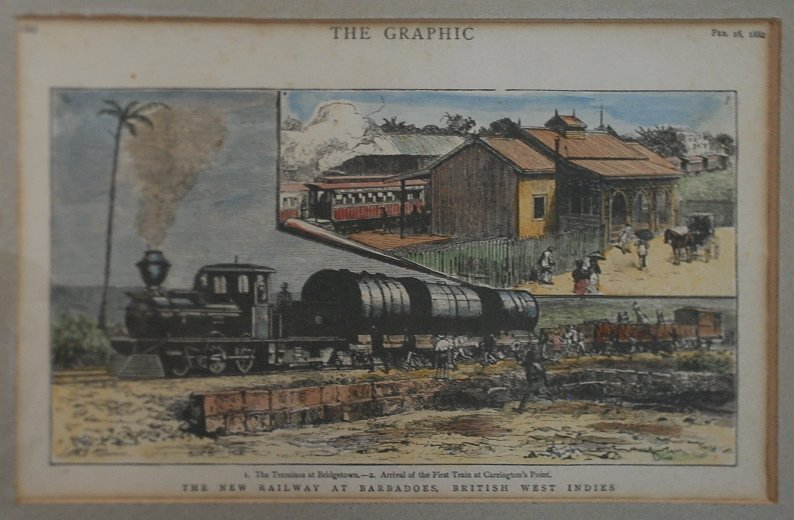
Artist impression of the Barbados Railway, published in The Graphic of 25 February 1882

The complete line up to Belleplaine was officially inaugurated in 1883 with a festive banquet. The dignitaries of the maiden voyage "wondered, why the railway should have ended so abruptly among barren sand hills", but they were apparently impressed by the meal, which had been prepared for the occasion. According to a contemporary report "nothing was heard for sometime but the rattle of knives and forks and the popping of soda-water and Ginger Ale corks, which with some good sound Claret and a little Bass, cooled by abundance of ice, formed the staple beverages."

Initially, the railway was operated with great success, due to large traffic of sugar, freight and passengers. The owners did not re-invest their earnings into the maintenance of their assets, so that the track deteriorated in the 1890s by corrosion, wear, rain and floodings and was in the need of a complete overhaul.

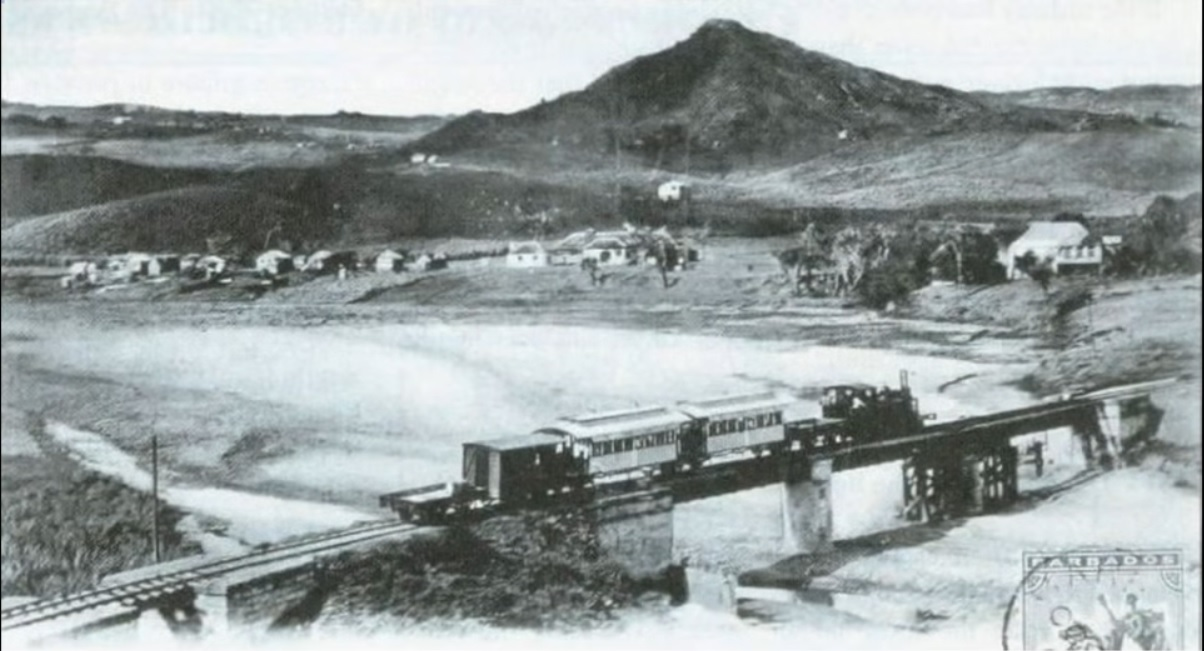
Bridge over Long Pond, St. Andrew, before re-gauging in 1898

Due to large storms in December 1896, long sections of the track became unusable because of erosion and flooding and had to be rebuilt completely. In the subsequent two years until 1898, the rail track was re-gauged to the new gauge of 762 mm (2 ft 6 in) by the internationally recognised railway specialist Everard Calthrop. New Baldwin locomotives and passenger cars were imported from the United States. The success was only short-lived, as the operators went into financial difficulties again when the governmental subsidies faded out. The railway was temporarily closed in 1904, while the liquidators tried to find another investor.

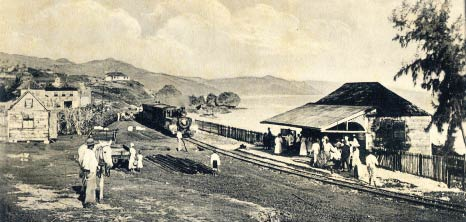
Bathsheba station, St. Joseph

A new railway company was founded in 1905 with the name The Barbados Light Railway Company Limited and took-over the operation. It expanded the services by installing a branch to Crane. Crane's Hotel placed advertisements for the passenger trains from Bushy Park, which stopped near to the hotel. But the company went into dire straits again in 1906, as there was only very limited passenger traffic and the goods transport was not profitable enough, to keep the company running. The government subsidies phased-out again in 1914, and the company went bankrupt.

The Government of Barbados took over the railway in 1916. After conducting some urgently needed repairs, it started initially with goods transport and with effect from 1917 it started again to transport passengers. Over the years, the railway deteriorated again. Even after buying a new train and overhauling the existing ones, the track itself became unreliable and caused some derailments. The buildings in Bridgetown required also some immediate refurbishment.

The railway line had a total of 98 bridges. Ernest Biffin, the General Manager of the Railway, explained in the 1920s that the railway was unique for two reasons: It had the most severe curve of any line he knew and one of the steepest gradients of any railway in the world. Just beyond Three Houses at Consetts Cutting the railway descended a 1 in 33 grade from the escarpment to sea level. Local people believe that curves were placed in the track because the railway company from England did not build lines less than 21 miles long. More likely, this could be the reason why it was extended into the sandy hills of Bellplaine.

The insufficient maintenance raised again some concerns in the early 1930s. The locomotive sheds and depots for the wagons had become unstable beyond repair, and the locomotives should have been stripped down and overhauled completely. An engine driver reported about the poorly maintained track and points: "About 150 feet (45 m) from the Carrington siding I noticed the points open half way for main and half for siding; at this discovery the steam was shut off, engine reversed and danger whistle blown. I can only say, Sir, that if those points had been run over undiscovered it would have been a moast (sic) terrible disaster."

The passenger cars were in poor condition with worn-out wheels and unreliable brakes. They needed to be re-painted, as did most of the railway's structures. The passenger traffic decreased from year to year. Passenger traffic was discontinued in 1934 due to safety concerns, and only limited goods transport was conducted, until the railway was closed completely on 12 October 1937. The steel tracks were lifted in 1938 and either scrapped or re-used as telephone posts.

== Rolling stock ==
=== Locomotives ===
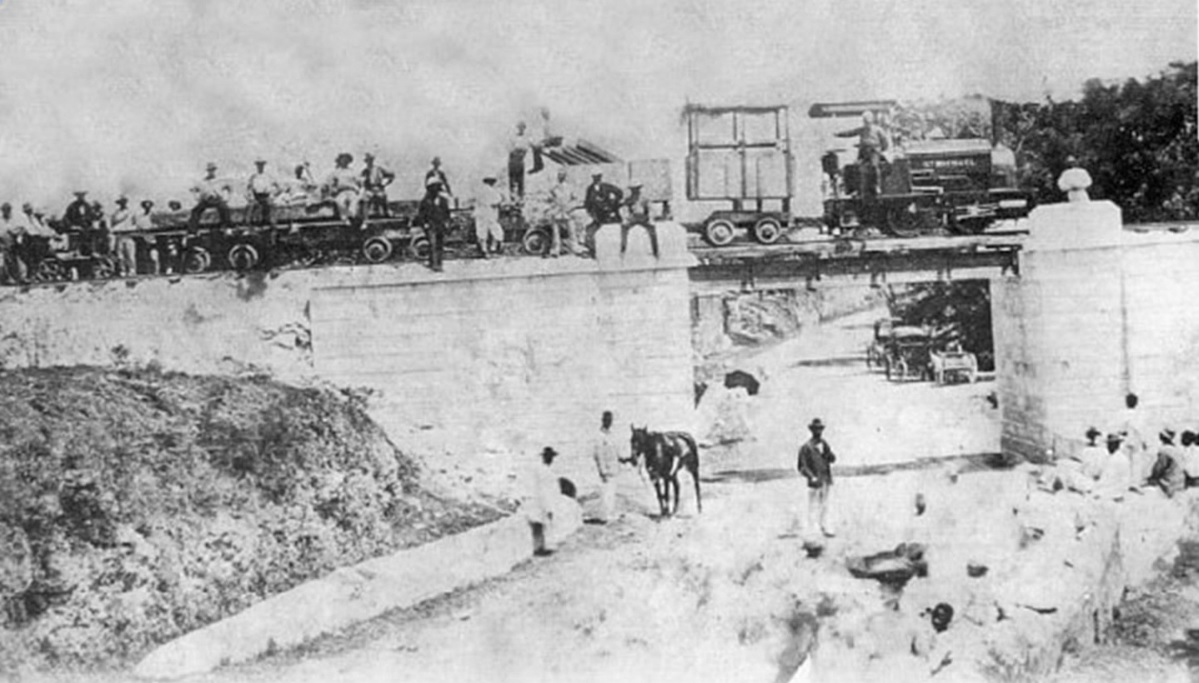
0-4-0 steam locomotive St. Michael of Black Hawthorn during construction of the railway

Initially, five steam locomotives were used:

- One 0-4-0 locomotive, St. Michael of Black Hawthorn, which had been owned by the construction company
- Two 2-6-2 tender locomotives from the Vulcan Foundry with a wheelbase of 5.68 m (18 ft 8 in) and a running weight of 27.3 t (30.1 short tons; 26.9 long tons)
- Two smaller 2-6-2 tender locomotives of Avonside Engine Company

In 1891 two new 0-6-0 heavy tank engines were acquired from W. G. Bagnall in Stafford. They had a relatively long 9 ft (2.7 m) wheelbase and consequently severe track damage resulted. They were disposed of in 1898.

After re-gauging to 762 mm (2 ft 6.0 in) gauge two 2-8-2Ts, one 2-6-0T and one 0-6-0T from Baldwin Locomotive Works were used.

=== Carriages ===
Initially, there were six mixed passenger cars of first and second class in an American style, five passenger cars of third class, ten open goods carriages and twenty tank cars for sugar.

== Regulations ==
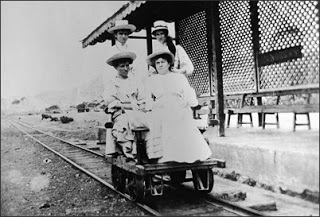
Draisine on the Barbados Railway

The regulations of the railway company demanded from guards and train drivers to "have their trains well under control" and to use "every exertion to stop any runaway vehicle that may become detached from a train whilst it is ascending before the impetus has become too great". They stated that "if the engine be defective the sooner the train can be stopped the better" and "if any vehicle be off the rails, the breaks (sic) in the rear must be instantly applied."

The guards were advised that "persons affected with insanity must not be placed with other passengers, but in a separate compartment" and to "use all gentle means to stop the nuisance caused by drunk or disorderly passengers".

== See also ==
- Barbados Tramway Company
- St. Nicholas Abbey Heritage Railway
- Rail transport in Barbados
