= Bajan Helicopters =

Bajan Helicopters Limited
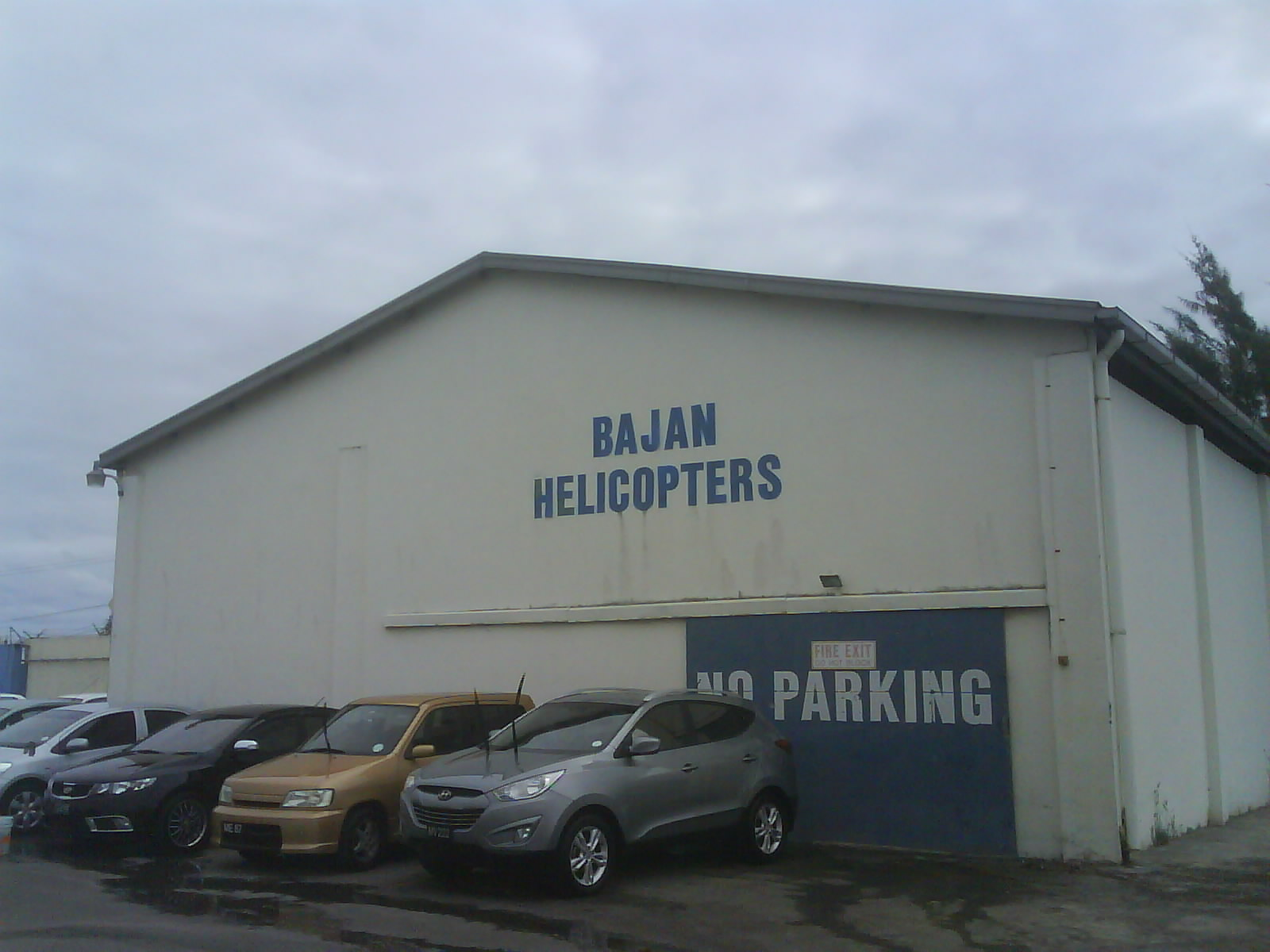
- The office of Bajan Helicopters
- Industry: Tourism
- Founded: 1989
- Fate: Defunct
- Headquarters: Bridgetown, Barbados

Bajan Helicopters Limited was a Bridgetown-based, Barbadian aviation company which was founded in 1989 and ceased trading in April 2009.

The company provided a number of helicopter supported services, such as Offshore/Maritime support, surveying, shipping services, aerial filming/photography, and aerial island tours, and managed the Bridgetown Heliport (ICAO): TBPO), situated in the Islands' capital. It transported such high-profile members as the British royal family around the Caribbean region and was affiliated with the Helicopter Association International.

== See also ==
- List of Barbadian companies
