= Ben Thackwray =

British adventurer and explorer (born 1980)

Ben Thackwray (born 13 May 1980) is a record breaking British adventurer, explorer, endurance athlete, ocean rower, mountaineer, cross-country skier, ultra distance runner, and former semi-pro footballer.

== Biography ==
Thackwray was born in Leeds, West Yorkshire and played semi-professional football for Farsley Celtic A.F.C and Guiseley A.F.C.

He is best known for rowing the Atlantic in 2008 and setting the fastest crossing of the Atlantic in a rowing boat (37 days) from the Canary Islands (San Sebastián de La Gomera, Spain) to Antigua as part of a 5-man crew aboard 'Oyster Shack' and the Guinness World Record for the fastest 1000 miles ever rowed in an ocean rowing boat.

In 2010, he and Ian Couch (also a crew member on Oyster Shack) set the fastest British crossing of Greenland.

In 2011 Thackwray climbed Mount Everest, making him one of only six people ever to have rowed an ocean and climbed Mount Everest.
