= Kevinia Francis =

Antiguan cyclist

Personal information
- Born: 12 April 1978 (age 48) Antigua and Barbuda

Cycling career
- Sport: Cycling
- Current team: Retired
- Discipline: Road
- Role: Rider

Kevinia Francis (born 12 April 1978) is a former road cyclist and rower from Antigua and Barbuda. She became Antigua and Barbuda national time trial champion in 2013, and national road race champion in 2014.

== Rowing 3,000 miles ==
In 2018, Francis competed in the Atlantic Rowing Race as part of Team Antigua Island Girls, finishing 13th. The team consisted of Francis, Elvira Bell, Christal Clashing, Samara Emmanuel with Junella King as an alternate. They had answered a call to create a team for Antigua to compete in 2019. There were many applicants but the number was reduced when it was decided to compete not in 2019 but in 2018. Kevinia herself was not keen to compete so quickly and one of the reasons was that she could not swim. She wanted more time to learn but eventually they went with the 2018 date.
