= Vehicle registration plates of Barbados =

Barbados
- Country: Barbados
- Country code: BDS

Current series
- Slogan: None
- Serial format: A1234 (A being the regional code)

Barbadian Vehicle registration plates consist of letters and numbers. The Barbados Licensing Authority issues licence plates to all new motor vehicle owners. Each licence plate has one or two letters which represents the part of the island which the vehicle's owner resides or previously resided at the time the vehicle was registered. The first part consists of one or two letters which determine the part of the island the registration is from, or category of vehicle. The international code for Barbadian plates is BDS.

Image	First issued	Design	Slogan	Serial format	Serials issued	Notes
						front and rear
						front

== By parish ==
The breakdown is as follows.

Parish	Letter
Parish of St. Andrew	A
Parish of St. Peter	E
Parish of St. George	G
Parish of St. John	J
Parish of St. Lucy	L
Parish of St. Michael	M
Parish of St. Joseph	O
Parish of St. Philip	P
Parish of St. James	S
Parish of St. Thomas	T
Parish of Christ Church	X

=== Syntax ===
For the parish of Christ Church, 'X' represents Jesus Christ and therefore 'X' is chosen. Other parishes are by their first names: Saint John has 'J', so Saint Joseph therefore moved on to the next letter 'O', Saint Andrew became 'A', Saint Michael became 'M', meanwhile Saint Philip became 'P', so Saint Peter became 'E', vehicles for Saint James having all other letters taken, became known as the last letter of its name "S". All of the remaining parishes were then able to be represented as the first letter of their name.

On the licence plate, the number can go up to 4 digits. So for example, a person whose licence plate is L999 lives in St. Lucy and has registered his or her vehicle in that parish.

Depending on the number of people living in a particular parish there are sometimes other letters following the first letter to create a licence plate such as MA 999 or XF 700. This is especially so in Christ Church and St. Michael where the populations are large.

As of November 2008, Barbados had approximately 126,361 registered vehicles on the roads.

== Special registration ==
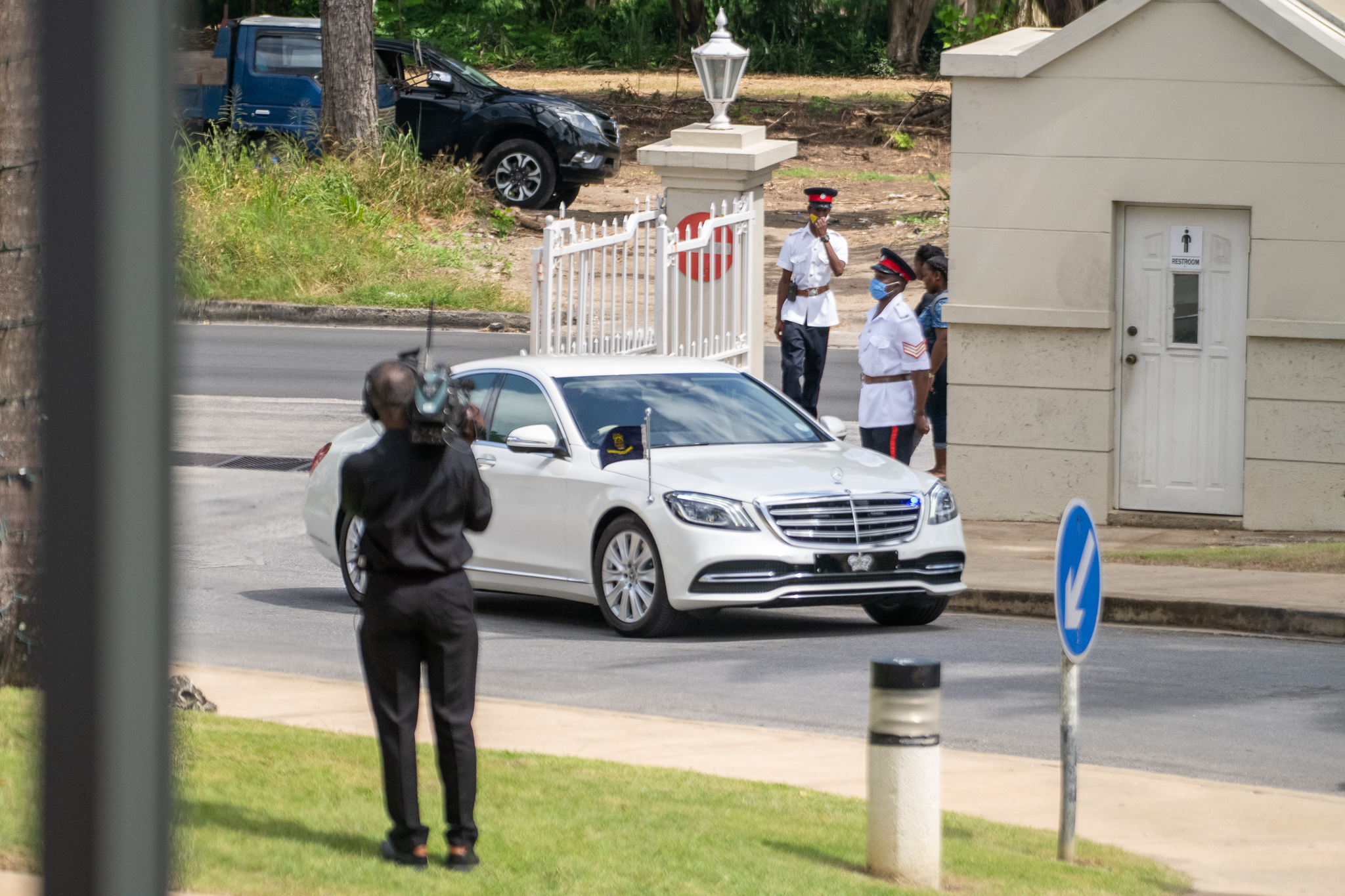
The vehicle for HM The Queen or her vice-regal representative the Governor-General before the country became a republic. (A single metallic crown emblem on black).

- Coat of arms with a wreath of flowers - President (A single metallic emblem on black)
- B - Mini buses (Blue on white)
- BM - Public buses
- BT - Tour bus
- C - Commercial vehicles (excluding B, BM, Z, ZM & ZR)
- CD - Consular and diplomatic vehicles (Yellow on blue)
- D - Defence Force Vehicles
- H - Hired rental vehicles (Blue on white)
- HL - Hired Limousine. (White on red)
- MP - Member of Parliament (Prime Minister bears "MP2"), other government-owned vehicles such as police force, civil service and government agencies (White on green)
- ML - Vehicles owned by Government Departments, run by Statutory Boards.
- PB - President of Barbados
- PBE - President of Barbados Emeritus/Elect
- Z - Taxis (Blue on white)
- ZM - Maxi taxi
- ZR - Private or contract buses or minivans (Blue on white)
- MO - (preceding up to 4 numbers) - Motor Dealers (Red on white)
- SL- (also preceding up to 4 numbers) - Special License Vehicles

== International markings ==
The international code, which should be shown to the rear of the vehicle on a black-on-white oval, and to be carried by Barbadian vehicles when circulating outside Barbados is 'BDS'.

Owners may use white on black plates, front and rear, or black on white (front) and yellow(rear), or silver on black on both sides.

== See also ==
- ISO 3166-2:BB
- International vehicle registration code
