= André Simon (cyclist) =

Antiguan road racing cyclist (1987–2023)

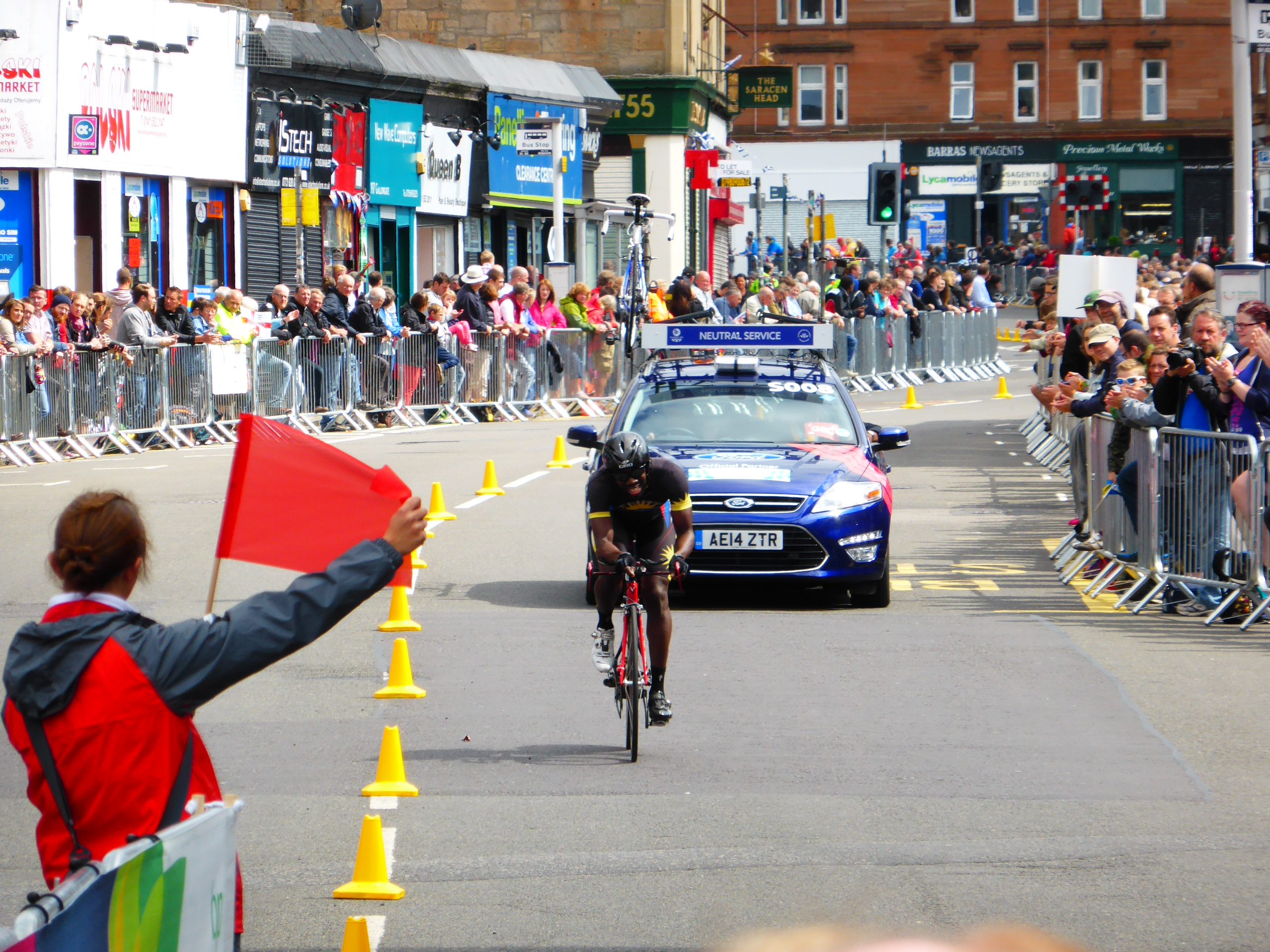
- Simon at the 2014 Commonwealth Games

Personal information
- Born: 13 November 1987
- Died: 8 June 2023 (aged 35) Houston, Texas, U.S.

Cycling career
- Sport: Cycling
- Discipline: Road
- Role: Rider

André Simon (13 November 1987 – 8 June 2023) was an Antiguan road racing cyclist. In May 2022, he was the victim of a road racing accident on Sir George Walter Highway. in Antigua, alongside Sean Weathered, Ghere Coates, and Tiziano Rosignoli. However, he was the only one seriously injured, and he died 13 months later in TIRR Memorial Hermann in Houston, Texas. Fundraisers were held in Antigua to help cover Simon's hospital bills.

== Major results ==
2012
2nd Road race, National Road Championships
2013
1st Road race, National Road Championships
2014
1st Time trial, National Road Championships
2015
National Road Championships

2nd Road race
3rd Time trial

2016
National Road Championships

1st Time trial
3rd Road race
