= St. Nicholas Abbey Heritage Railway =

Heritage railway in Barbados

Coordinates: 13.276569°N 59.588005°W

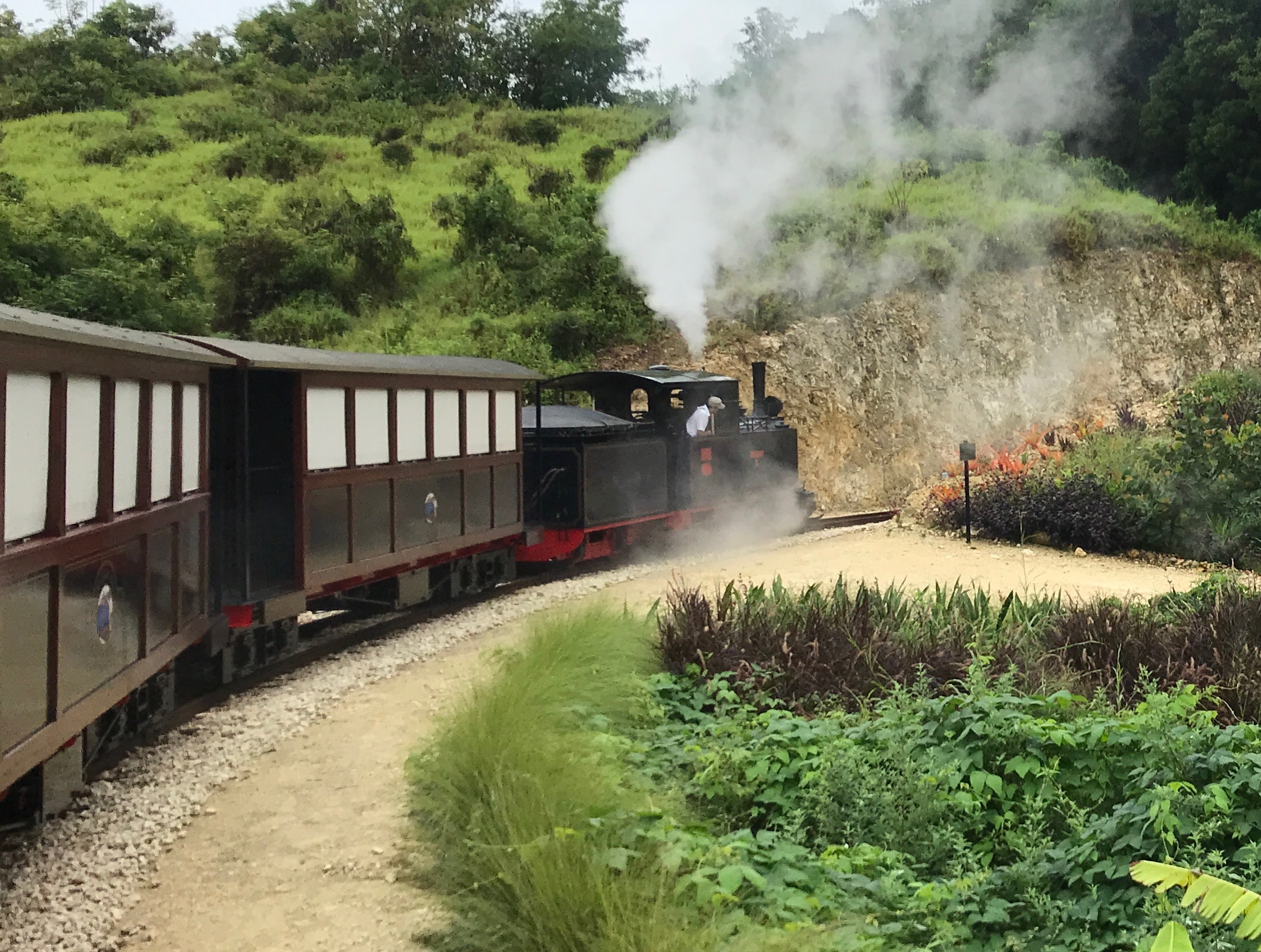
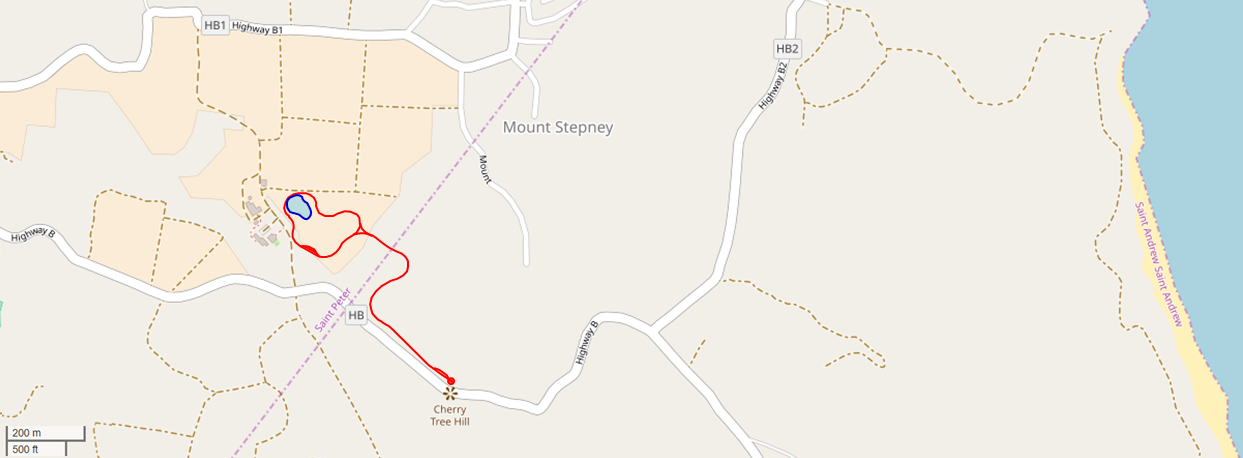
- A passenger train ascending the incline to Cherry Tree Hill. Route superimposed onto an OpenStreetMap

Technical
- Line length: 1.5 kilometres (0.9 mi)
- Track gauge: 2 ft 6 in (762 mm)

St. Nicholas Abbey Heritage Railway (SNAHR) is a 1.5 kilometres (0.9 mi) long heritage narrow gauge railway with a 2 ft 6 in (762 mm) gauge, in the parish of Saint Peter on the Eastern Caribbean island of Barbados.

== History ==
The railway was conceived and financed by Barbadian architect Larry Warren, the current owner of the St Nicholas Abbey estate, and completed in 2018.

Operations were inaugurated on 21 January 2019, with a diesel service, the steam locomotive still undergoing a major rebuild and overhaul at that time. The formal opening ceremony was performed on 11 March 2019 by the Prime Minister of Barbados, Mia Mottley, who ceremonially tolled a locomotive bell preserved on the site, and originally attached to one of the Baldwin Locomotive Works steam engines which operated the national Barbados Railway network following its re-gauging to 2 ft 6 in (762 mm) gauge, and which operated from 1883 to 1937, but was dismantled during the second world war.

SNAHR has the same gauge as the earlier Barbados Railway. It was built in a project with a budget of 2 million Barbados Dollars (1 million US dollars, 0.86 million €). It employs up to 15 full-time staff, for which 700 applications were originally received.

== Route ==
The heritage railway runs on a balloon-shaped track from St Nicholas Abbey to the panoramic view point Cherry Tree Hill. It offers locals and tourists a 45 minute long train ride, including a stop to enjoy the panorama overlooking the sea. The railway is designed to provide a family day-out for general tourists, but also a specialist experience for railway enthusiasts, with short lectures on Barbadian railway history offered (as an optional attraction) during the stop at Cherry Tree Hill, where volunteers are also recruited to assist in turning the locomotive on the manually operated turntable.

The main loop encircles an ornamental lake. The loop and the incline up to Cherry Tree Hill are connected by a triangle of track, permitting various permutations of operational route. The main engineering and stock storage sheds are located alongside St Nicholas Abbey station.

There are three stations on the line:

- St Nicholas Abbey Station, with shop, toilet, catering, car-parking, and engineering facilities;
- Cherry Tree Hill Station, with run-round loop, and platform with access to the road;
- Croquet Lawn Halt, adjacent to the lake and estate house (alight only) for passengers visiting the rum distillery.

== Rolling stock ==
=== Locomotives ===
Most of the tourist trains are hauled by one of the railway's historic steam locomotives.

No 5 is a Mallet locomotive (a type of steam engine with an articulated main frame, enabling operation on tight radius track), built in 1914 by the Arnold Jung locomotive works in Germany, and operated as No. 5 at the Ceper Baru Sugar Mill in Central Java, Indonesia. From there it was sold to Graham Lee at the Statfold Barn Railway. After a complete overhaul and rebuild it was delivered to Barbados on 7 February 2019. The Jung maker's build number is 2279, but it also carries maker's plate number 651 of Statfold Engineering Limited, having been comprehensively rebuilt in 2018. It is normally pre-heated using a coal fire in the morning, but fired with both coal and wood during operation.

No 6 is an 0-4-0T locomotive built by La Meuse (works number 3243 of 1926) which was constructed for light industrial shunting on the internal rail network of SA Hoboken in Antwerp, Belgium. The engine moved in preservation to the Welshpool and Llanfair Light Railway, and later the Statfold Barn Railway. From there it was sold to St Nicholas Abbey Heritage Railway, being relocated to Barbados in 2020.

Additionally two historic Hudswell Clarke 0-6-0DM diesel locomotives are in service, hauling passenger trains in low-season service, or when the steam locomotives are unavailable. The Hudswell Clarke diesels provided all motive power when the line was first opened for several weeks, until the first steam locomotive was available for service.

For track inspection a smaller Simplex diesel-mechanic locomotive is available.

No	Works No	Year	Name	Photo	Manufacturer	Type	Comments
5	2279	1914	Tjepper	St Nicholas Abbey Heritage Railway (Barbados), Jung locomotive No 5.	Jung	0-4-4-0T Mallet	Formerly at Statfold Barn Railway. In service.
6	3243	1926	Winston	St Nicholas Abbey Heritage Railway (Barbados), La Meuse locomotive No 6.	La Meuse	0-4-0T	Formerly at Statfold Barn Railway. Originally at SA Hoboken in Antwerp, Belgium. In service.
49	D1418	1971	Badger	St Nicholas Abbey Heritage Railway (Barbados), Hudswell locomotive No 49.	Hudswell Clarke	0-6-0DM	Originally at Shotton Steelworks. Acquired from Statfold Barn Railway. In service.
50	D1419	1971		St Nicholas Abbey Heritage Railway (Barbados), Hudswell locomotive No 50.	Hudswell Clarke	0-6-0DM	Originally at Shotton Steelworks. Acquired from Statfold Barn Railway. In service.
	40SD503	1974			Simplex	4wDM	Ex Severn Trent Works in Minworth. In service.

=== Passenger vehicles ===
For passenger transport three wheel chair accessible railway carriages are in use, which have verandahs at both ends, and a loudspeaker system through which the conductor provides a live commentary on the outward leg of the journey. The sound system can also play a pre-recorded multi-lingual narrative when non-English-speaking passengers are carried. Each of the carriages can accommodate up to 40 passengers.

- Bogie passenger saloon carriage Quinn Byron, built 2018
- Bogie passenger saloon carriage Arthur T Henry, built 2018
- Bogie passenger saloon carriage George Larry, built 2018

=== Engineering vehicles ===
A number of freight vehicles are available, chiefly for engineering purposes. These include:

- 4-wheel high-sided open wagon
- bogie flat wagon incorporating hydraulic lift arm
- 4-wheel workshop flat wagon
