= Raynauth Jeffrey =

Guyanese cyclist

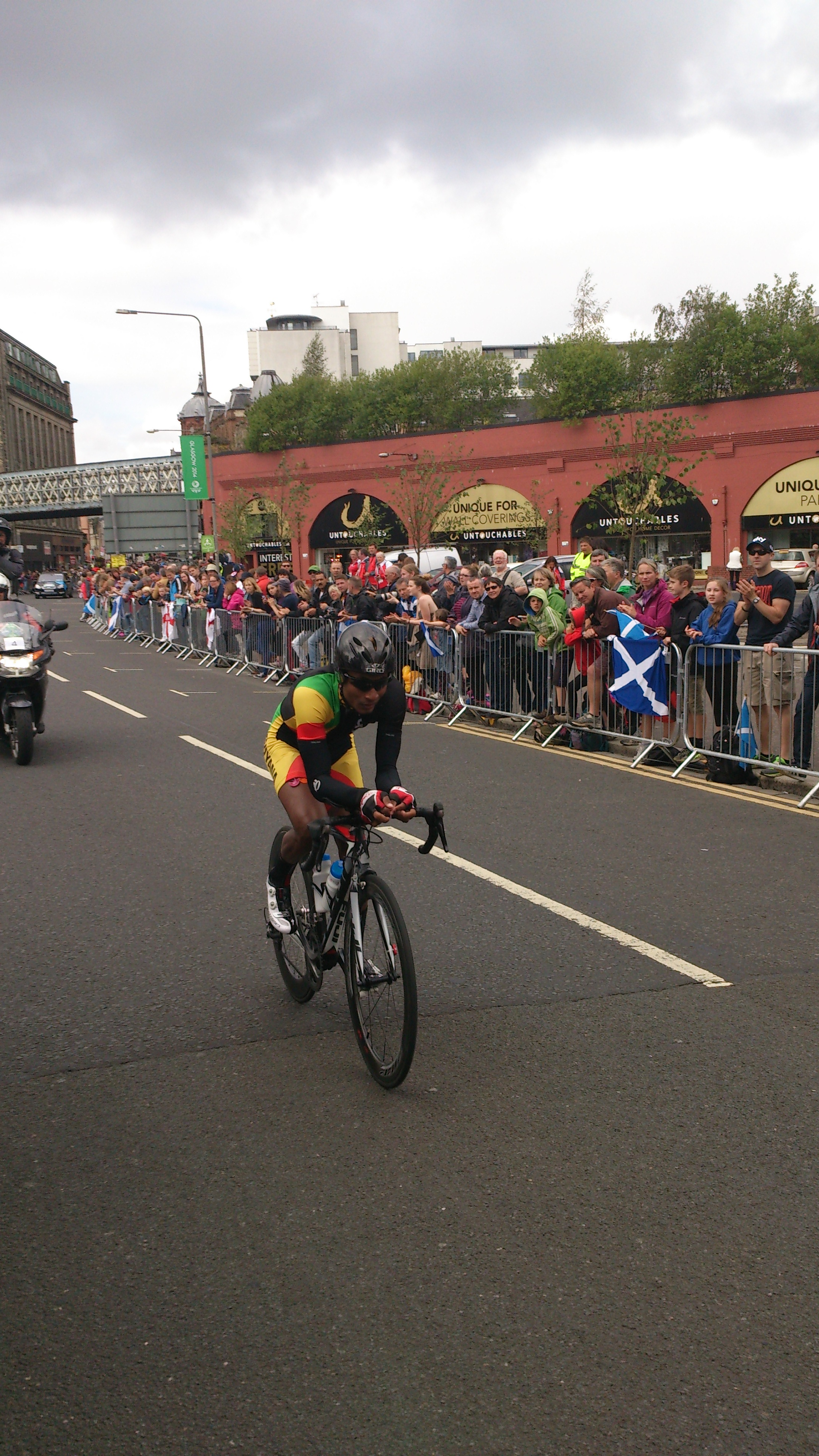
- Jeffrey at the 2014 Commonwealth Games

Personal information
- Born: 22 May 1994 (age 32) Georgetown, Guyana
- Height: 1.68 m (5 ft 6 in)
- Weight: 136 lb (62 kg)

Cycling career
- Sport: Cycling
- Current team: Verrazano TR
- Discipline: Road
- Role: Rider

Amateur teams
- 2018: CRCA/Foundation
- 2019: CCB Racing
- 2021: Foundation CCB
- 2022: CRCA/Foundation
- 2025–: Verrazano TR

Major wins
- One-day races and Classics National Road Race Championships (2013, 2017) National Time Trial Championships (2013, 2014, 2016–2018, 2021)

Raynauth Jeffrey (born 22 May 1994) is a Guyanese cyclist. He is a two time national road race champion and an eight time national time trial champion of Guyana. He has a daughter from a previous relationship.

== Major results ==
2012
2nd Road race, National Road Championships
2013
National Road Championships

1st Time trial
1st Road race

2014
National Road Championships

1st Time trial
3rd Road race

2016
National Road Championships

1st Time trial
2nd Road race

National Under-23 Road Championships

1st Time trial
1st Road race

2017
National Road Championships

1st Time trial
1st Road race

4th Tobago Cycling Classic
2018
1st Time trial, National Road Championships
2021
1st Time trial, National Road Championships
