= List of highways in Barbados =

Barbados has Highway coverage throughout the entire country.

== List ==
This is a list of Barbadian Highways. The main highways number 1–7, however there also smaller secondary routes off these main highways.

  - ABC Highway: University Hill, St. Michael – Charnocks, Christ Church
  - Ermie Bourne Highway: Belleplaine, St. Andrew – St. Elizabeth's Village, St. Joseph
  - Highway 1 (H1): Bridgetown, St. Michael – Mile & A Quarter, St. Peter
  - Highway 1A (H1A): Holetown, St. James – Rock Hall, St. Thomas
  - Highway 1B (H1B): Speightstown, St. Peter – Bentham's, St. Lucy
  - Highway 1C (H1C): Clinketts – Spring Hall, St. Lucy
  - Highway 2 (H2): Bridgetown, St. Michael – Portland, St. Peter
  - Highway 2A (H2A): Warrens, St. Michael – Pleasant Hall, St. Peter
  - Highway 3 (H3): Bridgetown, St. Michael – Palmers, St. John
  - Highway 3A (H3A): Jackmans, St. Michael – Coffee Gully, St. Joseph
  - Highway 3B (H3B): Salters, St. George – Gall Hill, St. John
- Highway 4 (H4): Bridgetown, St. Michael – Massiah Street, St. John
  - Highway 4A (H4A): St. George Parish Church, Glebe Land, St. George – Balls, Christ Church
  - Highway 4B (H4B): Brighton, St. George – Thicket, St. Philip
  - Highway 4C (H4C): Six Roads, St. Philip – Ashford, St. John
  - Highway 5 (H5): Bridgetown, St. Michael – Bayfield, St. Philip
  - Highway 6 (H6): Bridgetown, St. Michael – Six Cross Roads, St. Philip
  - Highway 7 (H7): Bridgetown, St. Michael – Charnocks, Christ Church (nearby Tom Adams Roundabout)
  - Princess Alice Highway: Bridgetown – Fontabelle, St. Michael, via Harbour Road
  - Spring Garden Highway: Fontabelle – Frank Worrell Roundabout, Black Rock, St. Michael
  - Charles Duncan O'Neal Highway: Theodore Brancker Roundabout (nearby St. Lucy's Parish Church), Nesfield, St. Lucy – Portland, St. Peter
