= ABC Highway =

Highway in Barbados

Major junctions
- From: Grantley Adams International Airport in Christ Church
- To: Cave Hill Campus, University of the West Indies, in Saint Michael

Location
- Country: Barbados

Highway system
- Highways in Barbados

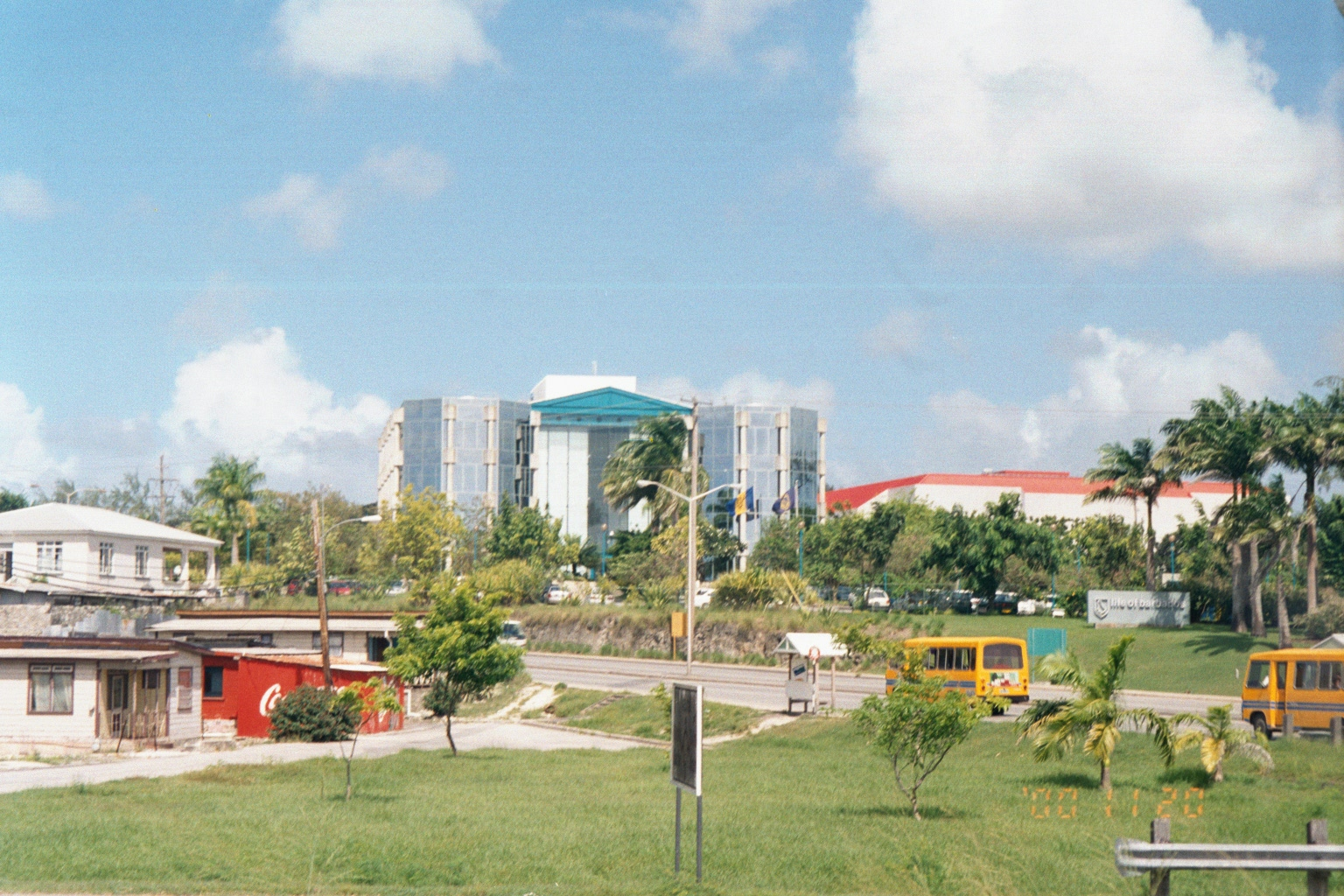
ABC Highway with two mini buses close to the Sir Garfield Sobers roundabout

The ABC Highway is the main urban highway in Barbados. Opened in 1989, it is named after three famous Barbadian politicians: John Michael Geoffrey Manningham ("Tom") Adams, Errol Barrow, and Hugh Gordon Cummins. From the east, the highway stretches from the Grantley Adams International Airport in Christ Church, to the western end at Cave Hill Road and University Drive, Cave Hill Campus, University of the West Indies, in Saint Michael. It roughly encircles the Parish of Saint Michael and the wider metropolitan area of Bridgetown.

== Route description ==
The highway consists of two-lane and dual carriageway sections with at-grade intersections, mostly roundabouts. A 2006–2007 expansion project enlarged some areas, and there was some public sentiment voiced in local media about the project's lack of a competitive tender process or studies to justify costs. On July 24, 2006, Rayside Construction and C.O. Williams Construction, two local companies, began the construction and widening of the ABC Highway from the Darcy Scott Roundabout in Warrens, St. Michael to the Garfield Sobers Roundabout in Bartletts, Christ Church. As part of the project, the old streetlights and traffic lights at the junctions of the ABC Highway and Pine East-West Boulevard, Upton Road at BET Hill on Highway R and Highway 6 were removed, and jersey barriers were constructed in the center. Additionally, new HPS streetlights were installed along the highway, and new roundabouts, including the Samuel Jackman Prescod and Darcy Scott Roundabouts in Warrens and the Pine, St. Michael, were constructed. The Greater Warrens Traffic Improvement Project was started from late December 2010 into early January 2011 to mid-December 2014 with construction and widening of Jackson Road on Highway 2 to the newly constructed Jackson Roundabout around the Baobab Tree and Lodge Hill, St. Michael, two Warrens Mini Roundabouts in Warrens, St. Michael and the Welches and Redmans Village Roundabouts in St. Thomas. On 27 April 2008, during its effect, they changed the junctions from a two-way street into a one-way street with the Wildey "Y" Junction of Upton Road on Highway R, the ABC Highway and Highway 6. There was also a footbridge construction at the Pine, St. Michael, from early September to late November 2012. They had also installed two new traffic lights; one at the pedestrian crossing at Mount Friendship, St. Michael, and another at Redman's Village, St. Thomas. The construction of the four-lane highway was finished by 31 August 2009. Also, the same construction with the Greater Warrens Traffic Improvement Project had started with the widening of the Ronald Mapp Highway on Highway 2A from the top of Warrens Hill, St. Michael to the top of Redman's Village, St. Thomas with the installation of jersey barriers and new streetlights along Highway 2A, Jackson Road on Highway 2 and the Warrens South Road with three roundabouts: two mini and a circular roundabout. Highway 2A between the top of Warrens Hill in St. Michael to the top of Redman's Village in St. Thomas via Welches in St. Thomas, was unfinished and incomplete and will soon be finished and completed after the elections of the new BLP Government. Finally, in the parish of St. Michael, from late April 2001 to late October 2003, they constructed from its entrance and exit to Dalkeith Road at the Garrison Savannah along with the junctions of Dalkeith Road and Harts Road; Dalkeith Road, Dalkeith Hill, Beckles Road and Culloden Road; Culloden Road, Pine Road, Bishop's Court Hill and Collymore Rock; Pine Road, with a reconstruction of Nita Barrow Roundabout, Pine Hill, Welches Road and Belmont Road, Government Hill, Welches Main Road and Tweedside Road; the junction of Roebuck Street and Country Road; the junction of Country Road, Passage Road, Whitepark Road and Bank Hall Road; the junction of Passage Road, Westbury Road, Baxters Road and Barbarees Hill; the junction of Westbury Road, Westbury Main Road, Prescod Boulevard and President Kennedy Drive; the junction of Eagle Hall Main Road, Black Rock Road, Barbarees Hill and Tudor Bridge; the junction of Black Rock Road, Black Rock Main Road, Deacons Road and Fairfield Road, some of the traffic lights and streetlights; and the junction of Black Rock Main Road, Brighton Road and Yearwood Road; and also they constructed Baxters Road before they removed all the old utility poles and replaced them with some of the CFL English lampposts.

== Junctions ==
Parish	Location	km	mi	Destinations	Notes
Christ Church	Seawell	0.0	0.0	Highway 7 (Tom Adams Roundabout)	13°4′49″N 59°29′28″W
Christ Church	Newton Terrace	4.4	2.7	Highway T (Henry Forde Roundabout)	13°4′49″N 59°31′50″W
Christ Church	Kendal Hill	7.5	4.7	Kendal Hill Road (Edwy Talma Roundabout)	13°4′42″N 59°33′28″W
Christ Church	Graeme Hall	8.7	5.4	Graeme Hall Road (Errol Barrow Roundabout)	13°4′38″N 59°34′6″W
Saint Michael	Wildey	10.3	6.4	Highway 6 (Sir Garfield Sobers Roundabout)	13°5′13″N 59°34′37″W
Saint Michael	Wildey	10.8– 11.6	6.7– 7.2	Highway 6 / Highway R (Wildey Triangle)	No access to Highway R from westbound lanes, 13°5′26″N 59°34′50″W
Saint Michael	Wildey	12.0	7.5	Samuel Jackman Prescod Polytechnic Roundabout	13°5′43″N 59°34′48″W
Saint Michael	Haggatt Hall	13.1	8.1	Highway 5 (J.T.C. Ramsey Roundabout)	13°6′18″N 59°34′48″W
Saint Michael	Rouen			Highway 4 (Norman A. Niles Roundabout)	13°6′49″N 59°35′0″W
Saint Michael	Friendship/Belle			Highway 3 (Clyde Walcott Roundabout)	13°7′36″N 59°35′43″W
Saint Michael	Warrens			Highway 2 (Everton Weekes Roundabout)	13°8′30″N 59°36′23″W
Saint Michael	Warrens			Ronald Mapp Highway (D'Arcy Scott Roundabout)	13°8′34″N 59°36′36″W
Saint Michael	Cave Hill, Saint Michael			University Drive, Cave Hill Road	Road continues as University Drive to the Frank Worrel Roundabout. 13°7′54″N 59°38′0″W
1.000 mi = 1.609 km; 1.000 km = 0.621 mi: Incomplete access

== Route to port ==
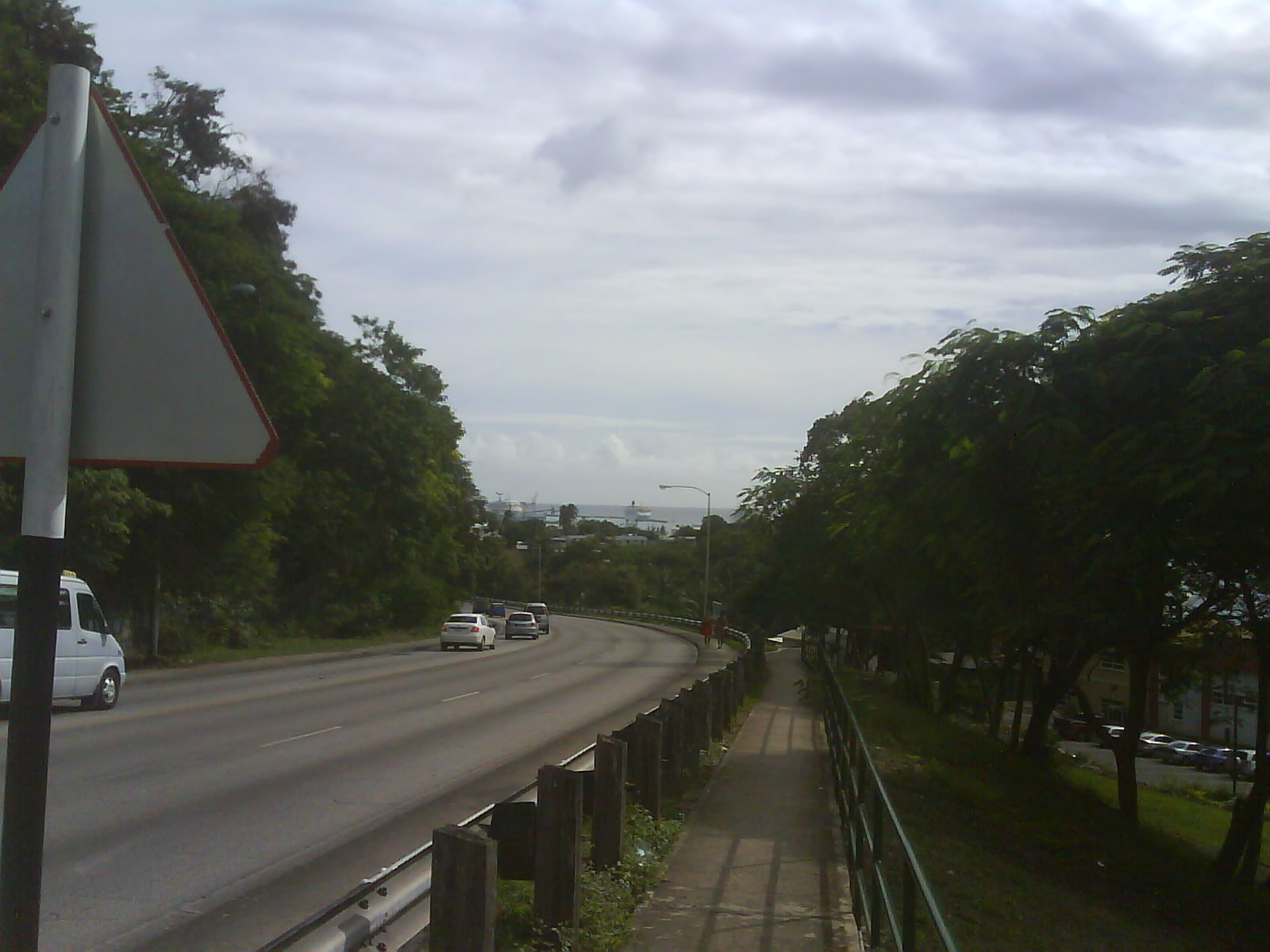
University Drive, westbound with port in distance

The ABC Highway provides relatively easy of access to the Deep Water Harbour in Bridgetown. At the official western terminus, the road becomes University Drive (at Cave Hill). The route proceeds to the Frank Worrel roundabout, where it has a junction with Highway 1 and the MacDonald 'Mighty Grynner' Blennman (formerly "Spring Garden") Highway. Direct access to the harbor is available via the M.G Highway from the Frank Worrel roundabout. At the end of M.G. Highway, direct access to the port is accessed by turning right onto President Kennedy Drive.
