= Port Saint Charles =

Coordinates: 13.2614°N 59.6425°W

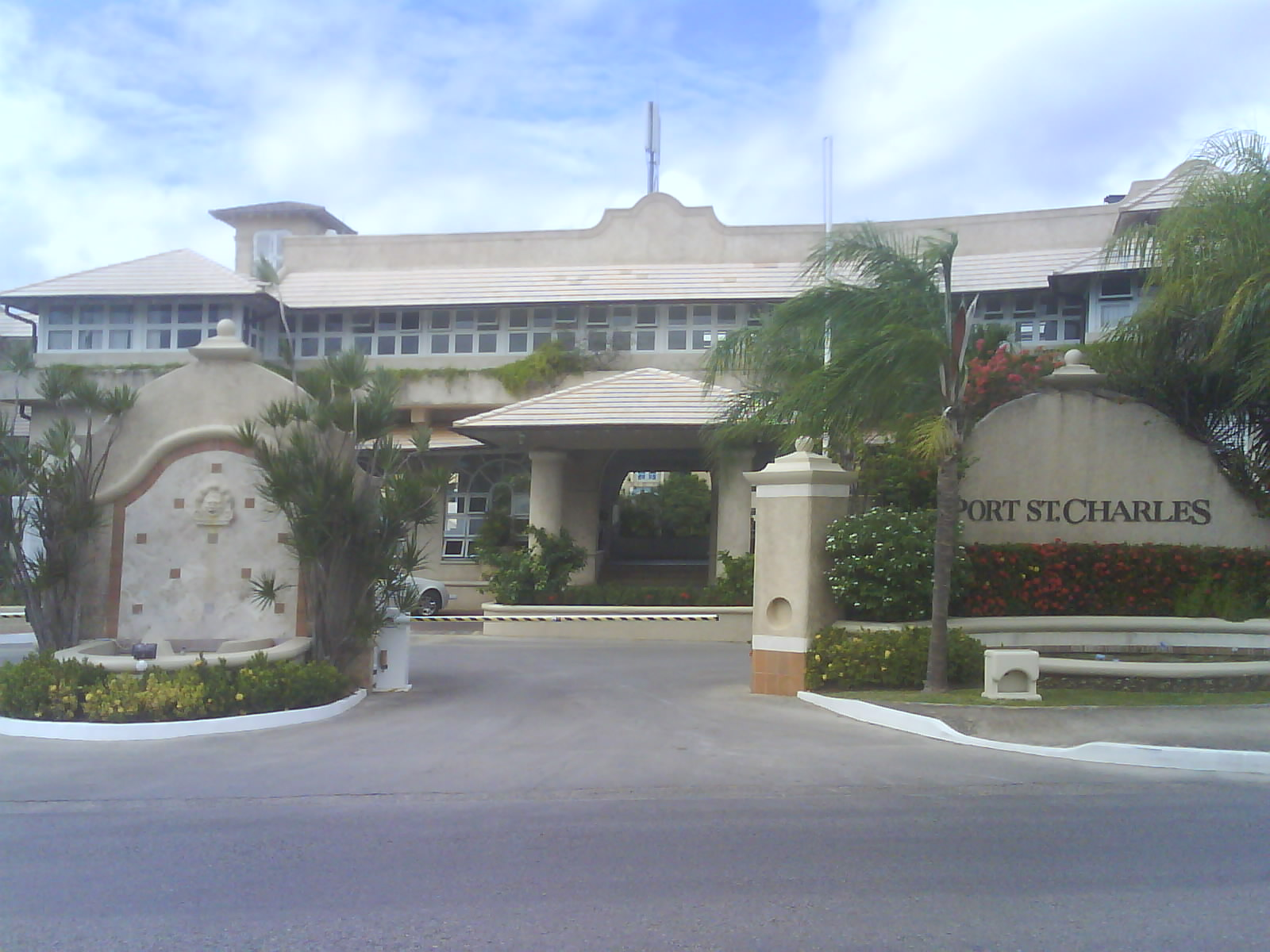
Port Saint Charles Marina

The Port St. Charles marina is a luxury marina development situated on the western coast of Barbados. Designed by the late Sir Charles Othneil "Cow" Williams, It is one of two officially designated sea-based ports of entry in Barbados, the Deep Water Harbour in the capital city of Bridgetown being the other.

== Location ==
Found within the parish of Saint Peter, the marina is in Heywoods and is in close proximity to Speightstown.

== Description ==
The Port St. Charles marina contains a total ad-measurement of 1549 m², and is made up exclusive villas, condos and apartments, and a small inland lagoon area (with a depth of 14 feet at low tide). These berths range from 30 ft to 110 ft in length. Water, electricity, telephone and television connection are available at all 50 ft to 110 ft berths and some of the smaller berths. In addition, there are six mega-yacht berths located on the offshore breakwater.

The marina is host to a branch of the Coastguard, Police, Immigration and Customs facilities operating on the offshore breakwater. There is a heliport to transport guests to the Grantley Adams International Airport or the Bridgetown Heliport, a health spa, and just off the coast of the Marina lies the Tom Snooch Reef.

The inner lagoon of Port St. Charles is restricted to residents or persons staying at the marina development.

== See also ==
- Port of Bridgetown
