= List of schools in Barbados =

== A ==
- A. Dacosta Edwards Primary – Belleplaine, Saint Andrew
- Al-Falah Muslim School – Passage Road, Saint Michael
- The Alexandra School – Speightstown, Saint Peter
- All Saints' Nursery – Pleasant Hall, Saint Peter
- All Saints' Primary – Pleasant Hall, Saint Peter
- All Saints' Primary Special Unit – Pleasant Hall, Saint Peter
- The Alleyne School – Belleplaine, Saint Andrew
- The Alma Parris School, Speightstown, Saint Peter 422-4688
- The Ann Hill School (special needs) – The Pine, Saint Michael
- Arthur Smith Primary – Saint Matthias, Christ Church
- Asonns Elementary School for Girls (private) – Bridgetown

== B ==
- Barbados Community College (tertiary) – Howells' Cross Road, Saint Michael
- Bridgetown Seventh-day Adventist Primary – Dalkeith Hill, Saint Michael
- Bay Primary – Bayville, Saint Michael
- Bayley's Primary – Merricks, Saint Philip
- Belleville Grammar (private) – Flint Hall, Saint Michael
- Belmont Primary – Belle Gully, Saint Michael
- Blackman Gollop Primary – Staple Grove, Christ Church
- Bournes Private School – Thornbury Hill, Christ Church
- Browne's Private School – Bank Hall, Saint Michael

== C ==
- The Codrington School (private), The International School of Barbados – Society, Saint John's Parish, Barbados
- Cane Vale Prep (private) – Cane Vale Gardens, Christ Church
- Chalky Mount Primary – Chalky Mount, Saint Andrew
- Charles F. Broome Memorial Primary – Government Hill, Saint Michael
- Charles F. Broome Memorial Primary Annex – Government Hill, Saint Michael
- Charles F. Broome Memorial Special Unit – Government Hill, Saint Michael
- Christ Church Foundation School – Church Hill, Christ Church
- Codrington College – Saint John
- Coleridge & Parry School – Ashton Hall, Saint Peter
- Combermere School – Waterford, Saint Michael
- Cuthbert Moore Primary – Saint Helens, Saint George

== D ==
- Darryll Jordan Secondary – Nesfield, Saint Lucy
- Deacon's Primary – Deacon's Road, Saint Michael
- Derrick Smith School & Vocational Centre - Jackmans, St. Michael
- Deighton Griffith – Kingsland, Christ Church
- Dottin's Academy (private secondary for males) – Navy Gardens, Christ Church
- Dyall's Private School – Sargeant's Village, Christ Church
- Daystars Academy (private) – Maxwell Main Road, Christ Church, Barbados

== E ==
- Eagles Academy Primary School – Strathclyde, Saint Michael
- Eagle Hall Primary – Eagle Hall, Saint Michael
- Eagle Hall Primary Special Unit – Eagle Hall, Saint Michael
- Eden Lodge Nursery – Eden Lodge, Saint Michael
- Eden Lodge Primary – Eden Lodge, Saint Michael
- Ellerslie Secondary School – Black Rock, Saint Michael
- Ellerton Primary – Ellerton, Saint George
- Ellerton Primary Special Unit – Ellerton, Saint George
- Elliott Belgrave Primary – Gays, Saint Peter
- Erdiston Nursery – Pine Hill, Saint Michael
- Erdiston Special School – Pine Hill, Saint Michael

== F ==
- Feels Like Home PreSchool (private) – Maxwell Main Road, Christ Church
- First Class Nursery – Belleville, Saint Michael
- Foundation School – Oistins, Christ Church
- Fredrick Smith Secondary – Trents, Saint James

== G ==
- The Graydon Sealy Secondary – Paddock Road, Saint Michael
- George Lamming Primary – Flint Hall, Saint Michael
- Gill's Nursery – Upton Road, Saint Michael
- Good Shepherd Primary – Prospects Road, Fitts Village, Saint James
- Gooding's Private School – Bridge Road, Saint Michael
- Gordon Greenidge Primary – Bakers, Saint Peter
- Gordon Walters Primary – Bright Hill, Christ Church
- Government Hill Nursery – Government Hill, Saint Michael
- Grace Bible Church Christian (private) – Paddock Road, Saint Michael
- Grantley Adams Memorial Secondary – Blackman's, Saint Joseph
- Grantley Prescod Primary – Pine North South Boulevard, Saint Michael
- Grazettes Primary – Grazettes, Saint Michael

== H ==
- Half Moon Fort Primary – Half Moon Fort, Saint Lucy
- Happy Vale Montessori – Welches, Saint Michael
- Harrison College – Crumpton Street, Saint Michael
- Headstart Nursery – Belleville, Saint Michael
- Hilda Skeene Primary – Ruby, Saint Philip
- Hill Top Prep – Kingston Terrace, Saint Michael
- Hillaby/Turners Hall Primary – Farmers, Saint Thomas
- Hindsbury Primary – Hindsbury Road, Saint Michael
- Holy Innocents Primary – Welchman Hall, Saint Thomas

== I ==
- Ignatius Byer Primary – Lowlands, Saint Lucy
- Irvin Wilson School – The Pine, Saint Michael

== J ==
- Joan Inniss Prep – Passage Road, Saint Michael
- Jones Private School – Callenders Court, Thornbury Hill, Christ Church

== L ==
- Lawrence T Gay Primary – Spooner's Hill, Saint Michael
- LITE Pre and Primary School - Kingston Terrace, Welches, St. Michael
- Lockerbie College (private primary & secondary) – "Lockerbie House", Britton's Cross Road, Saint Michael
- The Learning Centre - Orange Hill, St. James
- The Learning Ladder – Black Rock, Saint Michael
- The Lester Vaughan School – Cane Garden, Saint Thomas
- Lockerbie College – Brittons Cross Road, Saint Michael
- The Lodge School – Society, Saint John
- Luther Thorne Memorial Primary – Wildey, Saint Michael

== M ==
- Maria Holder Nursery – Sharon, Saint Thomas
- Merrivale Prep – Pine Road, Saint Michael **NO LONGER IN OPERATION**
- Mount Tabor Primary – Mount Tabor, Saint John
- Milton Lynch Primary School [formerly Christ Church Boys – Water Street, Christ Church

== O ==
- Oxnards Nursery – Oxnards, Saint James
- Olga Millar Nursery – Six Cross Roads, Saint Philip

== P ==
- Parkinson Memorial Secondary School – The Pine, Saint Michael
- People's Cathedral Primary – Bishop's Court Hill, Saint Michael
- Princess Margaret Secondary – Six Cross Roads, Saint Philip
- Providence Elementary School (private primary and secondary) – Francia Plantation, Saint George

== Q ==
- Queen's College – Husbands, Saint James

== R ==
- River Road Nursery – River Road, Saint Michael
- The Rock Christian Primary – Strathclyde, Saint Michael
- Roland Edwards Primary – Battalleys, Saint Peter
- Reynold Weekes Primary – Four Roads, Saint Philip

== S ==
- Shirley Chisholm Primary School (formerly Vauxhall) Christ Church
- St. Albans Primary School Lower Carlton, Saint James
- St. Ambrose Primary – Cypress Street, Saint Michael
- St. Angela's Convent – Collymore Rock, Saint Michael
- St. Bartholomew's Primary – Parish Land, Christ Church
- St. Bernards Primary – Lammings, Saint Joseph
- St Boniface Nursery – Sion Hill, Saint James
- St. Catherine's Primary – Clarke's Hill, Saint Philip
- St. Christopher's Primary – Saint Christopher, Christ Church
- St. Cyprian's Boys' – Brittons Cross Road, Saint Michael
- St. Elizabeth Primary – Saint Elizabeth, Saint Joseph
- St. Gabriel's (private) – Collymore Rock, Saint Michael
- St. George Primary – Constant, Saint George
- St. George Secondary – Constant, Saint George
- St. Giles' Nursery – The Ivy, Saint Michael
- St. Giles' Primary – The Ivy, Saint Michael
- St. James' Primary – Trents, Saint James
- St. John's Primary School – Glebe Land, Saint John
- St. Joseph Primary – Horse Hill, Saint Joseph
- St. Judes Primary – Saint Judes, Saint George
- St. Lawrence Primary – Saint Lawrence, Christ Church
- St. Leonard's Boys Secondary – Richmond Gap, Saint Michael
- St. Lucy's Primary – Trent, Saint Lucy
- St. Luke's Brighton Primary – Brighton, Saint George
- St. Lukes Academy (The Rock, St. Peter)
- St. Margarets Primary – Glenburnie, Saint John
- St. Mark's Primary – Blades Hill, Saint Philip
- St. Martin's Mangrove Primary – Saint Martins, Saint Philip
- St. Mary's Primary – Mason Hall Street, Saint Michael
- St. Matthew's Primary – Jackmans, Saint Michael
- St. Michael School – Martindales Road, Saint Michael
- St. Nicholas Nursery – Stepney, Saint George
- St. Patrick's R.C. – Jemmott's Lane, Saint Michael
- St. Paul's Primary – Brittons Cross Road, Saint Michael
- St. Philip Primary – Church Village, Saint Philip
- St. Silas' Primary – Orange Hill, Saint James
- St. Stephen's Nursery – Saint Stephen's Hill, Saint Michael
- St. Stephen's Primary – Black Rock, Saint Michael
- St. Winifred's – Pine Hill, Saint Michael
- Salvation Army Nurse try – Wotton, Christ Church
- Samuel Jackman Prescod Institute of Technology (tertiary) – Wildey, Saint Michael
- Selah Primary – Content, Saint Lucy
- Seventh-day Adventist Secondary (private) – Dalkeith Hill, Saint Michael
- Sharon Primary – Sharon, Saint Thomas
- Society Primary – Society, Saint John (closed 8 September 2014)
- Springer Memorial – Government Hill, Saint Michael
- Sunshine Early Stimulation Centre

== T ==
- The Irving Wilson School (special needs) – The Pine, Saint Michael
- The Learning Ladder Daycare and PreSchool – Black Rock, Saint Michael
- The Schoolhouse for Special Needs – Reservoir Road, Britton's Hill, Saint Michael
- The Rock Christian Primary – Strathclyde, Saint Michael
- Thelma Berry Nursery – Saint Davids, Christ Church
- Twinkling Stars – Passage Road, Saint Michael
- Trinity Academy – Eagle Hall, Saint Michael

== U ==
- Ursuline Convent – Lower Collymore Rock, Saint Michael NO LONGER In SERVICE.
- University of the West Indies, Cave Hill Campus – Cave Hill, Saint Michael

== W ==
- Warrens Primary and Preschool – Haggatt Hall, Saint Michael
- Wee Pals Montessori – Upton Plantation, Saint Michael, Barbados
- Welches Primary – Redmans Village, Saint Thomas
- Wesley Hall Infants – Kings Street, Saint Michael
- Wesley Hall Junior – Kings Street, Saint Michael
- West Terrace Primary – West Terrace, Saint James
- Westbury Primary – Westbury Road, Saint Michael
- Wilkie Cumberbatch Primary – Pinelands, Saint Michael
- Wills Primary – Elcourt House, Maxwell, Christ Church
- Workmans Primary – Workmans, Saint George

== See also ==
- Education in Barbados
- Lists of schools
- List of secondary school leaving qualifications
- List of primary and secondary school tests
- List of admission tests to colleges and universities
