= John Shepherd (cricketer) =

Barbadian cricketer (born 1943)

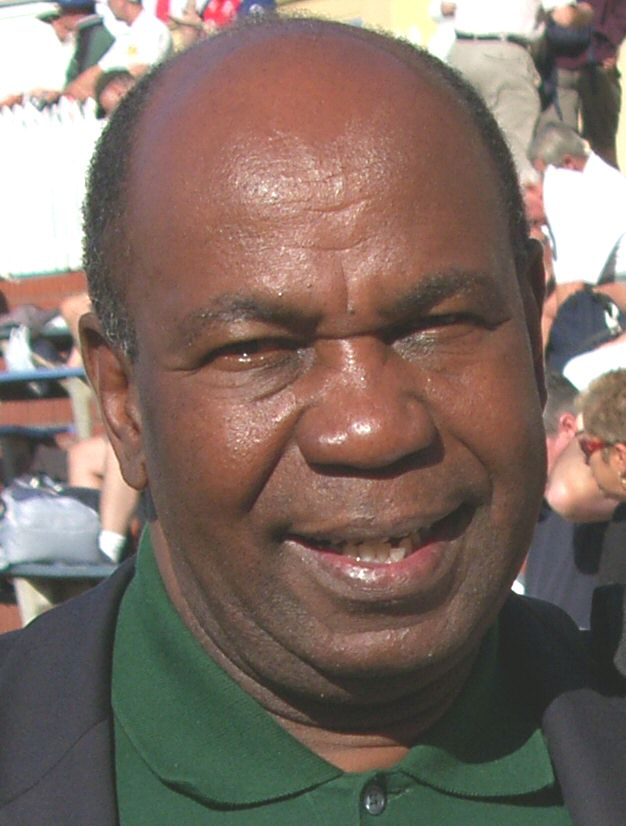

Personal information
- Born: 9 November 1943 (age 83); Belleplaine, Saint Andrew Parish, Barbados
- Batting: Right-handed
- Bowling: Right-arm medium

International information
- National side: West Indies
- Test debut: 12 June 1969 v England
- Last Test: 13 April 1971 v India

Domestic team information
- Years: Team
- 1964/65–1970/71: Barbados
- 1966–1981: Kent
- 1975/76: Rhodesia
- 1982–1987: Gloucestershire

Career statistics
Competition	Test	FC	LA
Matches	5	423	326
Runs scored	77	13,359	4,337
Batting average	9.62	26.34	21.05
100s/50s	0/0	10/72	1/13
Top score	32	170	101
Balls bowled	1,445	75,327	15,480
Wickets	19	1,157	436
Bowling average	25.21	27.71	21.62
5 wickets in innings	1	54	1
10 wickets in match	0	2	0
Best bowling	5/104	8/40	6/52
Catches/stumpings	4/–	292/–	86/–
- Source: CricInfo, 5 April 2017

John Neil Shepherd (born 9 November 1943) is a Barbadian former cricketer who played in five Test matches for the West Indies cricket team between 1969 and 1971. Shepherd had a long career in English county cricket for Kent County Cricket Club and Gloucestershire County Cricket Club. He was born in Belleplaine, St Andrew in Barbados and played for the Barbados cricket team in his early career.

Shepherd made his Test debut against England in Manchester, taking five wickets. He was a Wisden Cricketer of the Year in 1979.

Although Shepherd's Test career was short, he played a remarkable amount of first-class cricket in a variety of venues: he played in both South Africa and Rhodesia, played 15 years for Kent and seven for Gloucestershire. He was the Cricket Professional at Eastbourne College in the early 1990s and President of Kent for 2011 where, as of 2017, he sits on the committee.

== See also ==
- List of West Indies cricketers who have taken five-wicket hauls on Test debut
