= Christopher Codrington (disambiguation) =

Christopher Codrington was an English colonial governor.

Christopher Codrington may also refer to:

- Christopher Codrington (colonial administrator) (1640s–1698), Barbadian-born planter and colonial administrator
- Christopher Bethell-Codrington (1764–1843), British member of Parliament and sugar planter, previously called Christopher Codrington
- Christopher William Codrington (1805–1864), British member of parliament
