= Romel =

Romel is a given name. Notable people with the name include:

- Romel Andrews (born 1963), American player of gridiron football
- Romel Beck (born 1982), Mexican basketball player
- Romel Currency (born 1982), West Indian cricketer
- Romel Raffin (born 1954), Canadian basketball player
- Romel Springer, Barbadian politician
- Romel Quiñónez (born 1992), Bolivian footballer
