= The Lodge School =

Location
- Society; St John; Barbados; 13°10′1″N 59°29′17″W

Information
- Type: Government secondary
- Motto: Possunt Quia Posse Videntur; They can because they think they can
- Religious affiliation: Anglican
- Established: 1745; 281 years ago
- Founder: Christopher Codrington
- Chairman of Board of Management: Patterson Cheltenham QC, appointed by the Minister of Education
- Headmaster: S Jackman 2024-
- Gender: 497 boys and 476 girls
- Age: 11 to 18
- Enrolment: Approximately 973
- Houses: Codrington, Emptage, Gooding, Laborde, Wedderburn
- School song: Here we stand where our fathers standing.
- Official phone: 1 (246) 423 3834
- Former pupils: Old Lodge Boys, Area 45, DGG, SPB

The Lodge School is a co-educational government secondary school in Saint John, Barbados, established in 1745. The school has closed and reopened four times, and has been known as Codrington College, The College, The Mansion School, the Codrington Grammar School, The Codrington Foundation School, Codrington Collegiate School, Codrington Endowed School, Codrington Lodge Grammar School and The Lodge Collegiate School. By 1882 the school's name had finally settled on The Lodge School, after the Chaplain's Lodge where some of the early classes were undertaken.

== Early history, 1745 to 1880 ==
The Lodge School had its beginnings in a bequest made by Sir Christopher Codrington who had two estates on the island. The Codrington experiment was to baptise and instruct in Christian education which was greeted with much suspicion by other Barbadian slave owners in the 18th century. Codrington managers were ordered to give his people time off for themselves (usually a Saturday), Sunday being reserved for Christian instruction through which they were to have the benefits of education and the consolations of Christian religion.

There is some dispute as to the exact date of the school's foundation. Building work is recorded as having commenced in 1714, but was not finished until 1743. The Barbados Pocket Book of 1838 however records that the Codrington Foundation School was founded in 1721. When the school opened its doors to twelve foundationers to "teach them gratis, the Sons of such Persons as shall be judged not to be in Sufficient Circumstances to bring them up in learning the learned languages" on 9 September 1745, some recognise this date officially as its inception. Other pupils were fee paying and most were boarders. The Lodge School is therefore one of the oldest secondary educational establishments on Barbados.

The bequest, Codrington Foundation School, was established with the purpose of educating boys who could be subsequently trained in "the study and practice of divinity, physic and chirurgery" there and at other seminaries in the region. In History of Barbados its author Robert Hermann Schomburgk gives an early account of Codrington College on pages 111–123. The first Bishop of Barbados, William Hart Coleridge , contributed immensely to the development of education in Barbados. The promotion of education was high on his agenda and the number of schools increased from eight to 83 during his episcopate. The number of children receiving education in these schools increased from 500 to 7000.

The hurricane of 1780 ruined many buildings on the island, including those of the school. Earlier in 1775, the school was closed as a result of financial difficulties with the Codrington estates and it was not until 1789 that it was able to open again, continuing in a precarious manner with a succession of Headmasters, such that by the middle of the last decade of the 18th century it was not flourishing.

The appointment of Rev. M. Gar 1797 marked an improvement academically. Under his leadership Foundation Scholarships were offered in 1819 to students to enable them to go up to further education.

Coleridge reorganised Codrington Foundation School so that it became in 1827 a training establishment for clergy as had been intended by its founder, Christopher Codrington. The Grammar School was transferred to the Chaplain's Lodge on the upper estate (from which the school later took its name) in 1829 under the charge of the Rev. John Packer and finally settled where it is now located on Codrington's Society Estate in the parish of St John. Measures were taken for the opening of the college "no longer as a mere Grammar school for boys, but as a strictly collegiate institution for the education of young men, especially with a view to Holy Orders" (Society for the Propagation of the Gospel report on Codrington College, 1847).

In 1846 the Barbados Legislature made its first state grant of £750 for education. The Rev. Richard Rawle was appointed as Principal of Codrington College and the training of elementary school teachers was undertaken. In 1850 the first Education Act was passed which also raised the grant to secondary schools to £3,000 per annum. By June of that year under the headship of Rev. W. Webb the numbers at the school had grown to 39 boys and two years later this had increased to 63 pupils, 48 of whom were boarders. In 1878 the governing body of the Lodge School was properly constituted and in the following year, the Government took over the running of the school, meeting all the expenses of the institution and paying a small stipend to the Society for the Propagation of the Gospel (SPC).

== Middle years 1880 to 1930 ==
The government leased the lands containing the school from the Society for the Propagation of the Gospel and the school reopened in 1881 as a grant maintained First Grade School administered by a governing body with Mr Tracey as Headmaster. An Education Commission established by Bishop Mitchinson secured an affiliation of Codrington College to Durham University. Improvements were made to the school, but its grammar school ethos remained unchanged.

On the retirement of Tracey in 1892, and with frequent changes of headmasters, the school floundered somewhat. In 1899, when O. DeC. Emtage was appointed Headmaster, the school began to flourish again under his leadership and by 1902 it had outgrown its accommodation. Building works were started and new wings were constructed to provide a library, improved science lecture rooms and a reading room. Also at the turn of the century, Mr Emtage instituted the annual speech at which athletic meetings were held. Prior to 1900 these were only held occasionally. In 1904 the Cadet Corps at The Lodge started and was the first such unit in the West Indies.

The Latin quote "Possunt Quia Posse Videntur" by Roman poet Virgil is the school's motto chosen by Mr Emtage, is also the school motto for Christ College, Brecon, Wales founded by royal charter in 1541 by King Henry VIII as well as for The Harvard-Westlake School in Los Angeles California. The English translation of the motto is "They Can Because They Think They Can". The school Arms and Crest were designed by Mrs Evan Sealy, wife of a former rector of St John in conjunction with Mr Emtage in the first decade of the 20th century. The school crest of the leading seahorse comes from the Barbados Arms. The coat of arms has a white field, indicative of purity and uprightness; a black and fess, hinting that the qualities signified by the field would be strenuously defended; and finally three Maltese crosses, the device of St John the Apostle and the Knights Templar of the same name. The fess and white field were adopted from the arms of Codrington College, the lions of the latter being replaced by Maltese crosses

When Mr Emtage resigned in 1931, the school could hardly be recognised as the one he took over in 1899. The school roll had increased to over 100, with nearly 60 being boarders.

== 1930 to present ==
With the appointment of Rev. H. B. Gooding to succeed Mr Emtage, The Lodge School had finally produced its own headmaster. The new headmaster re-introduced Greek into the curriculum and encouraged the study of Classics. In 1935 the Memorial Hall was completed, partly to accommodate the increased number of boarders on the first floor, but also to provide for more classrooms. Construction of a new science/laboratory block accommodating additional classrooms on a second floor also took place. The number of applications to join the school increased, especially from neighbouring islands, and when Gooding retired in 1941 the school roll had passed 150, which included about 70 boarders.

The Memorial Hall was built from funds raised almost exclusively by Old Boys in honour of former pupils who died in the First World War. It was opened in 1935 and bronze plaques bearing the names of those who died in both World Wars were added in 1965.

In May 1944, the Sanatorium and Library was destroyed by fire. The Library was temporarily rehoused in locked cupboards in a classroom until 1953 when a small room became available where the books were stored. The new library rebuilt from subscriptions and re-opened in 1955. Further building works were undertaken and the boarding establishment was enlarged to accommodate 30 more termly boarders by 1945. By June 1946, the school roll had increased to 213. In September 1950 the school roll passed 300 for the first time.

In 1959 the Government, through the Education Act, instituted the Common Entrance Examinations to The Lodge and similar secondary education schools on the island. Around this time the school roll exceeded 400.

For much of the 1960s, the school population was quite static but pressure by government was beginning to be placed on the school to increase its numbers and the Governing Body acceded to the wishes of the Minister of Education to expand into a three form entry such that the 1967 school roll of 438 had passed 550 by 1970. Two new laboratories were added in 1967 eventually leading to two labs for each of the three science disciplines. The following year a new classroom block to accommodate a further three classrooms was opened.

In 1971 the government instituted free secondary education which immediately impacted on the boarding establishment of the school, such that by 1979 this 234-year aspect of the Lodge School became uneconomic to maintain. In the mid-1970s girls from other schools entered the sixth form. Earlier, in 1953, several girls from a sister school, Codrington High School, came to The Lodge to undertake Science (Chemistry, Physics and Biology) A Level instruction, but it was not until 1974 that The Lodge enrolled its first girls into the school.

In 1979 the hundred-year lease the Government was given on the premises by the SPC expired and it took the opportunity to acquire full possession of the premises The Lodge School in October 1983.

== Influence on the development of the Cadet Corps in Barbados ==
In the latter part of the 1800s and early 1900s, Englishmen coming to the island were struck by the close similarities of the Barbadian grammar schools to the English public schools. However, they noticed that there was a lack of equivalent school discipline, i.e. there was no system of prefects, monitors etc.

This shortcoming was rectified in late 1903 when the then Headmaster of The Lodge, Mr. O. Emptage considered that the psychological moment had arrived and he approached the science master, an officer at the time with the Barbados Volunteer Force, with the suggestion to develop, either a regular Cadet Company or at least a Drill Squad.

In the first term of 1904 the attempt proved so successful that it was decided that a Cadet Company, with proper military establishment be formed. Thanks to the efforts of the Governor, Sir Fedrick Hudgson, V.D, a gift of 25 drill purpose carbines was presented. These were later supplemented with defunct CLBs.

That first Company consisted of 43 Cadets, one Company Sergeant Major, four Corporals, four Lance Corporals, four Front Rank cadets.

During that time, a system existed where the better cadets occupied the front rank while others occupied the other ranks. When sufficiently good at drill, a boy was eligible for promotion to the front rank. This allowed a system of development and promotion even before being promoted to non commissioned officer status.

Much of the historical information above is courtesy of P. D. Frost's kind copy of F. A. Hoyos, Two Hundred Years: A History of the Lodge School, 1745–1945, published by the Barbados Advocate, as well as B. B. Ward's History of The Lodge School 1745–1900.

== Rolls of Honour of the two World Wars ==
The Rolls of Honour commemorating the school's war dead are on two bronze plaques on either side of the entrance to the Memorial Hall, the portal of which has the word Remember engraved. The Lodge School Old Boys' Association raised funds over several years to have these memorials to their fallen comrades installed and consecrated in 1965.

1914 – 18	1939 – 45
A. F. M. Berkeley	P. L. I. Archer DFC
A. G. Cameron DSC	G. L. A. Clarke
H. T. A. Cox	P. E. Davison
A. Edghill MC	A. P. C. Dunlop
J. S. Gardiner	P. DeFreitas DSC
R. Hancock DSO	A. W. Gooding
M. R. Hannam	J. A. Greenidge
R. E. L. Hollinsed	J. D. Greenidge
W. L. Hutchinson	T. D. L. Johnson
F. L. Johnson	R. C. Lynch
J. Manning	J. H. Manning
C. G. Peterkin	J. C. Manning
H. S. Wilson	W. H. B Short DFC
J. S. Wilson	J. W. S. Skinner
	H. V. F. Smith

== Headmasters ==
- Rev T. Rotherham 1745–53
- Rev J. Rotherham 1754–58
- Rev T. Falcon 1759–63
- Rev J. Butcher 1763–75 (first Barbadian to be appointed)

(school closed for 14 years due to financial difficulties with the Codrington estates)

- Rev H. Husbands 1789–92
- Rev W. Thomas 1792–96
- Rev M. Nicholson 1797–21
- Rev S. Hinds 1821–23
- Rev H. Parkinson 1823-1829
- Rev J. Packer 1829–34
- Rev T. Watts 1834–43
- Rev E. Parry 1844–48

(school closed Midsummer 1848–11 June 1849)

- Rev E. Smith 1849–50
- Rev W. T. Webb 1850–64
- Rev W. Allder 1864–65 (Acting)
- Rev J. Jaques 1865–66
- Rev C. Clarke 1866-1871
- Rev W. H. Prideaux 1872–78

(school closed for four years due to financial difficulties with the SPG and its decision to hand the assets of the school over to the government on a 99-lease basis)

- C. Tracey 1882–91
- Rev R. Jones 1891–92
- W. Burslem 1892–94
- E. Buck 1895–97
- A. Hernaman 1897–99
- O. DeC. Emtage 1899–1931
- Rev H. B. Gooding 1932–41
- T. L. Evans 1942–49
- W. A. Farmer 1949–54
- A. R. V. Newsam 1954–64
- P. McD Crichlow 1965–72
- C. E. A. Smith 1972–84
- C. de M. Nicholls 1986–91
- D. Browne 1992–2003
- T. Pilgrim 2003–12
- V. Dash 2012–2016
- W. Dowrich 2016 - 2019
- R.Douglas 2019 - 2024
- S. Jackman 2024 - 2026
- M. Russell 2026 -

== Renovations ==
A BD$25m project has begun involving the construction of two blocks, a hall, pavilion, new bathrooms, additional exits and other refurbishments to the school's facilities. The Memorial Hall will be kept but many buildings will undergo improvements. As of Jan 2015 significant work has taken place with a number of new buildings having been constructed and several buildings refurbished. The original deadline for completion of the Three Phase works was June 2013, but this has slipped.

Among the upgrades for the school is a new electronics laboratory and four new information technology laboratories. There is a new pavilion to the south of the old one and the final new construction will be an auditorium. Approximately 95,000 sq ft of land on the south eastern boundary of the compound has been purchased from Guinea Estates Limited to accommodate the new building.

== See also ==
- Codrington School (Barbados)
- Codrington College
- List of schools in Barbados
