= Codrington School (Barbados) =

Coordinates: 13.17158°N 59.47789°W

The Codrington School, The International School of Barbados

Location
- Society; Saint John, 20008; Barbados

Information
- School type: Independent school Day
- Established: 1917; reestablished 2002
- Founder: Sylvia Johnson (reestablishment)
- Principal: Darryl Francis Brown
- Faculty: 25
- Grades: Early Years (age 3) to Grade 12
- Language: English
- Website: www.codrington.edu.bb

The Codrington School began in 1917 as a boarding school. However, in the late-90s it closed and the buildings lay empty for some years. The present Codrington School began its life, in the renovated buildings, in September 2002, with just eight children. By the beginning of the 2008–2009 school year this number had risen to 132 children. In June 2012, the Codrington School celebrated its first IB Diploma Programme graduation class. Since then the programme has gradually expanded and the school has graduating classes accepting University places all around the world.

The school buildings are set in three acres of wooded grounds, which include gardens and mahogany trees that are more than a century old, as well as a large sports field and specialist facilities for art, science, ICT, music and drama. It has a small, but rapidly growing, library. In the spring of 2007, the Parents and Friends Association donated an air-conditioned ICT lab, fully equipped with computers, to the school. The school has an outdoor canteen as well as several newly refurbished modern language suites.

The professional staff is headed by a career international school administrator, who joined the school in 2012. The student body represents 30 different nationalities, including Barbadian (25%), British (17%) and US citizens (15%). Other nationalities represented include: German, Japanese, French, Venezuelan, Guatemalan and Canadian. It teaches gifted students from grades 4 to 8.

The school, whose academic year runs from September to July, offers students the opportunity of studying to the highest levels of national and international excellence. It is an IB World School, authorized to offer three IB programmes - The Primary Years Programme (PYP), Middle Years Programme (MYP) and the Diploma Programme (DP). All children in the primary school study Spanish from the age of seven and students in the upper years may opt to do both French or Spanish.

The school has a broad enrichment programme, which includes art club, chess, choir, cricket, drama, fencing, foreign languages, instrumental music, karate, rugby, Scrabble, scuba diving, soccer, surfing and tennis. All children through the age of thirteen have swimming lessons as part of the regular curriculum.

== See also ==
- Education in Barbados
- List of schools in Barbados
- Codrington Plantations
- Codrington College
- The Lodge School
