= Greenland Landfill, Barbados =

The Greenland Landfill has never been used. The controversial construction project was completed in the middle of a national park in the Scotland District of Barbados, and was subsequently deemed unfit for use as a landfill. Bajan people continue to be upset about the outcome, and it is utilized as a political talking point indicative of distrust and mismanagement. While the choice to put the landfill in a beautiful, newly established national park was considered absurd, Barbados is so small that there were limited options and the need to a solid waste solution was urgent. Due to the failure of this project, there continues to only be one functional landfill in Barbados. That landfill was negatively affecting resident's heath to the point that they were promised the closure of that landfill and the opening of another. The promise was unable to be kept due to conditions at Greenland Landfill.

== Location Choice ==
In 1993, the selection process for a new sanitary landfill began through Stanley Consultants. they identified twenty-four potential landfill sites, and evaluated based on various criteria. Votes occurred in 94 and 95. An environmental impact assessment was reportedly also conducted on the Greenland site by another consulting firm.

=== First Sanitary Landfill ===
The Mangrove Pond Landfill is still the only Sanitary Landfill, but it was deemed to be unsuitable due to the leachate issues, frequent fires, and negative health effects of neighboring persons. Solving this became a political promise and legal concern. The Honorable Simmons in particular took legal action on behalf of the residents of Arch Hall, and made a campaign promise to close the mangrove pond landfill. In response to this, a contracting firm was hired to evaluate the suitability of various places around the Island.

=== Rejected Considerations ===
Four sites were deemed most suitable: Blowers in St. James, Harrisons Point in St. Lucy, Lamberts in St. Lucy and Greenland in St. Andrew.

Varied problems included groundwater contamination and strong wind which would blow the smell across the island.

=== Scotland District ===
Greenland, St Andrew in the Scotland District was a natural quarry where shale was long ago mined for the one cement factory on the island. The Scotland District has a very different landscape due in part to being comprised more of oceanic clay than of coral, and this makes it prone to landslides. It is also prone to landslides due to environmental degradation from colonialism.

In May 1994, Various governmental agencies voted for the Greenland site. According to Minister of Health at the time, Miss Thompson, "The Government of the day established a committee to look at the sites, make a decision and recommendation to the Minister which would then go to the Cabinet. The committee comprised the Ministry of Agriculture, the Barbados Association of Professional Engineers, a representative of the Chief Town Planner, National Conservation Commission, The Soil Conservation Unit, National Trust, Government Satellite Corporation and other Government departments. It was a massive committee. They met for months reviewing the sites identified. Eventually, they all came down to Greenland in St. Andrew."

A great deal of money was spent in determining the Scotland District contained a suitable site. Due both to the needs of residents at Arch Hall, and to impacts upon political careers, many officials were committed to following through in spite of concerns both of landscape integrity, as well as aesthetic affects that would impact the citizens enjoyment as well as the income generated from tourism.

== Construction ==
The contracting firm NorConsult was given the contract in 1996 for construction management of the landfill. Spring Point Management and North Western Construction were given the contract to build the tip. According to interviews conducted by NorWatch reporter Harald Eraker in 1996, NorConsult project manager Finnborud stated "[W]e cannot let us be guided by special interests. This is a legal decision that we can't interfere in. We trust a thorough evaluation of the project has been made, as the project is supported by the Inter-American Development Bank (IDB). Our job is to ensure that the development is carried out responsibly, according to plans and regulations." IDB provided the financing for the entire project, after delaying approval several times due to concerns.

=== Initial Construction Concerns ===
On April 27, 2000, The Barbados Cabinet was still optimistic that continued construction on the Greenland site would be productive. The gave a directive for the Ministry of Health to support the Mangrove Pond Landfill for at least another 18 months, saying, "It is anticipated that within that time the problems at Greenland would have been overcome and we can move to Greenland and close Mangrove." Liz Thompson was a strong advocate of the Greenland site. She spoke extensively on this in the House Assembly in 2000, and is also quoted in media as suggesting redefining the national park to simply not contain the landfill. In the Assembly meeting she goes on the state that the issues were not with the location, but with correctable "construction defects".

== Controversy ==
The location chosen for this landfill was a source of active controversy for over a decade. One loud and persistent voice advocating for the Scotland District against the construction and use of the landfill was Richard Goddard, Chairman of the Scotland District Association (SDA), and farmer. Goddard's farm was uphill from the chosen site. He wrote a great deal of letters and may have delayed the loan from the IDB multiple times. He also asked for intervention on the part of the High Court.

The landfill project has become an Achilles heel for the government, with many seeing this as a large waste of limited government resources. To make matters worse, several of the instructions given by the contractor which developed the technology for the Barbados government were either ignored or overlooked. Part of the instructions given involved the ongoing safe maintenance of the landfill and its membrane lining. The instructions were that the landfill should remain wet/moist to create a safe protective membrane. Following heavy rains during its dormancy, water had begun to pool in the landfill crater. The government pumped out this water which led directly to the drying and cracking of the landfill's permanent lining system meant to protect the landscape from waste seepage. The government spokesman tried to give some meaning behind the failed venture by saying the landfill will be opened after repairs even though some studies and experts claim landslides could take place in the area possibly dumping the waste downhill into the sea.

== See also ==
- Saint Andrew
- Scotland District
- Solid Waste Management Programme
