= Saint Andrew (Barbados Parliament constituency) =

Parliamentary constituency in Barbados

- Constituency for the House of Assembly of Barbados
- Region: Saint Andrew, Barbados

Current constituency
- Created: 1645

Saint Andrew is a constituency in the Saint Andrew parish of Barbados. It was established in 1645 as one of the original 11 constituencies. Since 2022, it has been represented in the House of Assembly of the Barbadian Parliament by Romel Springer, a member of the BLP. (Note: As with all constituencies, the constituency elects one member of parliament (MP) by the first past the post system of election at least every five years.) The Saint Andrew constituency is a safe seat for the BLP.

== Boundaries ==
The constituency runs:

From a point on the eastern sea coast south of Barclays Park and east of the terminus of the gully leading to the culvert which crosses the East Coast Road, in a straight line to the terminus of the gully; thence along this gully to its junction with an unclassified road leading to Cambridge; thence in a southerly and then in a south westerly direction along this unclassified road to its junction with a public road known as Coggins Hill; thence in a north westerly direction along the middle of Coggins Hill to its junction with Highway 2 (the Haggatts-Springvale Road); thence in a south westerly direction along the middle of Highway 2 to a point in the centre of the road opposite to a monument (B.7) placed on the western side of the road; thence in a straight line to the triangulation station known as “Hillaby” S.15 at the end of the Hillaby Tenantry Road; thence in a westerly direction along the middle of Hillaby Tenantry Road to its junction with the Farmers-Turners Hall Road; thence in a southerly direction along the middle of Farmers-Turners Hall Road to its junction with the Farmers-Plum Tree-Ridgeway Gully; thence in a westerly direction along the Constitution (Electoral and Boundaries L.R.O. 2007 F8 Commission) (Review of Boundaries) Order, 2002 Farmers-Plum Tree-Ridgeway Gully to the point at which it is crossed by the Ronald Mapp Highway (the Warrens-Rock Dundo Road); thence in a northerly direction along the middle of the Ronald Mapp Highway to the point at which it crosses the Westmoreland-Spring Head Gully; thence in an easterly direction along the middle of the Westmoreland-Spring Head Gully to a point in the gully 325 metres south of Spring Head Plantation; thence in a straight line to the centre of the old mill wall at Spring Head Plantation; thence in a straight line to the point at which it touches the terminus of a track leading to Black Bess and Mangrove Plantations; thence in a straight line to its junction at Rock Hall Tenantry with the public road leading from Rock Hall Plantation to Rock Hall Village and the track leading to Roebuck Village; thence along this track in a generally northerly direction to its junction at Roebuck and Indian Ground-Four Hill Road; thence in a northerly direction along the middle of Indian Ground-Four Hill Road to its junction with the public road leading from Orange Hill Plantation to Welch Town Plantation; thence continuing in a northerly direction along the Orange Hill Plantation-Welch Town Plantation Road to its junction at Welch Town Plantation with Farley Hill-Portland Road; thence in a north westerly direction along the Farley Hill-Portland Road to its junction with the Mile-and-a-Quarter-Diamond Corner Road; thence in an easterly direction along the middle of the Mile-and-a-Quarter-Diamond Corner Road to its junction with the Diamond Corner-Cherry Tree Hill-Morgan Lewis Road; thence in an easterly direction along the middle of the Diamond Corner-Cherry Hill-Morgan Lewis Road to its junction with a public road leading to Boscobel; thence in a northerly direction along the middle of the public road leading to Boscobel to its junction with a private road leading to Foster’s Funland; thence generally easterly along this road and along the southern section of the loop at the end; thence continuing in an easterly direction to the sea coast; thence in a southerly direction along the sea coast to a point on the sea coast south of Barclays Park and east of the terminus of the gully leading to the culvert which crosses the East Coast Road (the starting point).

== Members ==
Election	Member	Party
2018	George Payne	BLP
2022	Romel Springer	BLP

== Elections ==
=== 2022 ===
St. Andrew
Party	Candidate	Votes	%	±%
BLP	Romel Springer	3,201	74.8	+0.3
DLP	Oldwin Skeete	965	22.5	+0.3
APP	Jacqueline Alleyne	116	2.7	+1.6
Majority		2,236	52.2	−0.1
Turnout		4,282		
BLP hold		Swing	0.0	

=== 2018 ===
St. Andrew
Party	Candidate	Votes	%	±%
BLP	George Payne	3,512	74.5	+21.9
DLP	V. Irene Sandiford-Garner	1,045	22.2	−25.2
SB	Cherie Pounder	68	1.4	new
UPP	Roli Roachford	53	1.1	new
Independent	Stephen Pollard	35	0.7	new
Majority		2,467	52.3	+47.1
Turnout		4,713		
BLP hold		Swing	+23.5	
