= Barclays Park, Barbados =

Village in Saint Andrew, Barbados

Coordinates: 13.236071°N 59.543416°W

Barclays Park is a 50-acre village in the parish of Saint Andrew in Barbados. Barclays Park was opened in 1966 by Queen Elizabeth II after being gifted to the Barbados government once independence was declared in 1966.
