= James Weatherhill =

James Weatherhill (Note: Last name also Weatherill.) (died 1702) was a privateer and pirate in the 1690s, and later a member of the Assembly of Antigua. He never stood trial for his piracy, though his actions were part of a series of accusations against Governor Codrington.

== History ==
Colonel James Weatherhill was granted a 350-acre property on Antigua in 1660. He became a privateer, commanding the Charles sloop during King William's War. In 1693 be captured a valuable Spanish merchant ship in violation of his privateering commission, its crew killed or "inhumanly abused." Local officials and the Captain of HMS Jersey traded with Weatherhill and harbored him until the coast was clear. Weatherhill arrogantly volunteered to be put on trial but the court refused to prosecute him. He subsequently served as a member of the Assembly from 1700 to 1701 before his death in 1702. Codrington was accused of collusion with the pirates and enabling black market trade with the French but was not charged.

Fellow privateer Thomas Lilly served under Weatherhill and was accused of piracy for continuing to attack French targets despite King William's War having ended. Like his mentor, he was never prosecuted.

== See also ==
- Nine Years' War, the larger European conflict of which King William's War was merely the colonial front.
