= Turner's Hall Wood =

Coordinates: 13.2344°N 59.5878°W

Turner's Hall Wood is a national forest and nature reserve in the parish of Saint Andrew in Barbados.
