= Beilby Porteus =

Anglican bishop (1731–1809)

The Right Reverend and Right Honourable Beilby Porteus
- Bishop of London
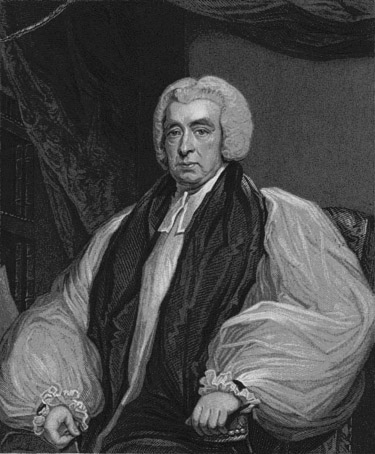
- 1787 engraving of Porteus
- Church: Church of England
- Diocese: Diocese of London
- Elected: 1787
- Term ended: 1809 (death)
- Predecessor: Robert Lowth
- Successor: John Randolph
- Other posts: Bishop of Chester; 1776–1787

Orders
- Ordination: 1757 (priest)
- Consecration: 1777

Personal details
- Born: 8 May 1731 York, Great Britain
- Died: 13 May 1809 (aged 78) Fulham Palace, London
- Buried: St Mary's Church, Sundridge
- Denomination: Anglican
- Residence: Fulham Palace, London
- Education: Christ's College, Cambridge

Beilby Porteus (or Porteous; 8 May 1731 – 13 May 1809), successively Bishop of Chester and of London, was a Church of England reformer and a leading abolitionist in England. He was the first Anglican in a position of authority to seriously challenge the Church's position on slavery.

== Early life ==
Porteus was born in York on 8 May 1731, the youngest of the 19 children of Elizabeth Jennings and Robert Porteus (d. 1758/9), a planter. Although the family was of Scottish ancestry, his parents were Virginian planters who had returned to England in 1720 as a result of the economic difficulties in the province and for the sake of his father's health. Educated briefly at St Peter's School, York and later at Ripon Grammar School, he was a classics scholar at Christ's College, Cambridge, becoming a fellow in 1752. In 1759 he won the Seatonian Prize for his poem Death: A Poetical Essay, a work for which he is still remembered.

He was ordained as a priest in 1757, and in 1762 was appointed as domestic chaplain to Thomas Secker, Archbishop of Canterbury, acting as his personal assistant at Lambeth Palace for six years. It was during these years that it is thought he became more aware of the conditions of the enslaved Africans in the American colonies and the British West Indies. He corresponded with clergy and missionaries, receiving reports on the appalling conditions facing the slaves from Revd James Ramsay in the West Indies and from Granville Sharp, the English lawyer who had supported the cases of freed slaves in England.

In 1769 Beilby Porteus was appointed as chaplain to King George III. He is listed as one of the lenten preachers at the Chapel Royal, Whitehall in 1771, 1773 and 1774. He was also Rector of Lambeth (a living shared between the Archbishop of Canterbury and the Crown) from 1767 to 1777, and later Master of St Cross, Winchester (1776–77).

He was concerned about trends within the Church of England towards what he regarded as the watering-down of Christian theology and stood for doctrinal purity against those who wanted to make optional confessional subscription to the Thirty-Nine Articles. At the same time he was prepared to suggest a compromise of a revision to some of the Articles. Always a Church of England man, he was, however, happy to work with Methodists and dissenters and recognised their major contributions in evangelism and education.

He was married to Margaret Hodgson. There is no record of them having any children.

== Bishop of Chester ==
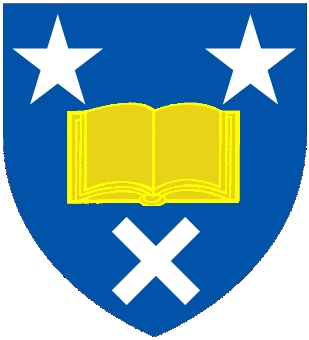
Arms: Azure a book Or between two mullets in chief and a saltire humetty in base Argent.

In 1776, Porteus was nominated as Bishop of Chester, taking up the appointment in 1777. He lost no time in getting to grips with the problems of a diocese which had a vastly growing population within the many new centres of the Industrial Revolution, most of which were in the north-west of England, but where there were the fewest parishes. The appalling poverty and deprivation amongst the immigrant workers in new manufacturing industries represented a huge challenge to the church, resulting in vast pressure upon the parish resources. He continued to take a deep interest in the plight of West Indian slaves, preaching and campaigning actively against the slave trade and taking part in many debates in the House of Lords, becoming known as a noted abolitionist. He took a particular interest in the affairs of the Society for the Propagation of the Gospel in Foreign Parts, especially regarding the Church of England's role in the administration of the Codrington Plantations in Barbados, where around 300 slaves were owned by the Society.

Renowned as a scholar and a popular preacher, it was in 1783 that the young bishop was to first come to national attention by preaching his most famous and influential sermon.

== Anniversary sermon ==
Porteus used the opportunity afforded by the invitation to preach the 1783 Anniversary Sermon of the Society for the Propagation of the Gospel in Foreign Parts to criticise the Church of England's role in ignoring the plight of the 350 slaves on its Codrington Plantations in Barbados and to recommend means by which the lot of slaves there could be improved.

It was an impassioned and well-reasoned plea for The Civilisation, Improvement and Conversion of the Negroe Slaves in the British West-India Islands Recommended and was preached at the church of St Mary-le-Bow before forty members of the society, including eleven bishops of the Church of England. When this largely fell upon deaf ears, Porteus next began work on his Plan for the Effectual Conversion of the Slaves of the Codrington Estate, which he presented to the SPG committee in 1784 and, when it was turned down, again in 1789. His dismay at the rejection of his plan by the other bishops is palpable. His diary entry for the day reveals his moral outrage at the decision and at what he saw as the apparent complacency of the bishops and the committee of the society at its responsibility for the welfare of its own slaves.

These were the first challenges to the establishment in an eventual 26-year campaign to eradicate slavery in the British West Indian colonies. Porteus made a huge contribution and eventually turned to other means of achieving his aims, including writing, encouraging political initiatives, and supporting the sending of mission workers to Barbados and Jamaica. Deeply concerned about the lot of the slaves as a result of the reports he received, Porteus became a committed and passionate abolitionist, the most senior cleric of his day to take an active part in the campaign against slavery. He became involved with the group of abolitionists at Teston in Kent, led by Sir Charles Middleton, and soon became acquainted with William Wilberforce, Thomas Clarkson, Henry Thornton, Zachary Macaulay and other committed activists. Many of this group were members of the so-called Clapham Sect of evangelical social reformers and Porteus willingly lent his support to them and their campaigns.

As Wilberforce's bill for the abolition of the slave trade was brought before the British parliament time and time again over 18 years from 1789, Porteus campaigned vigorously and energetically supported the campaign from within the Church of England and the bench of bishops in the House of Lords.

== Bishop of London ==
In 1787, Porteus was translated to the bishopric of London on the advice of Prime Minister William Pitt, a position he held until his death in 1809. As is customary, he was also appointed to the Privy Council, and Dean of the Chapel Royal. In 1788, he supported Sir William Dolben's Slave Trade Bill from the bench of bishops, and over the next quarter century he became the leading advocate within the Church of England for the abolition of slavery, lending support to such men as Wilberforce, Granville Sharp, Henry Thornton and Zachary Macaulay to secure the eventual passage of the Slave Trade Act in 1807.

In view of his passionate involvement in the anti-slavery movement and his friendship with other leading abolitionists, it was especially appropriate that, as Bishop of London, he should now find himself with official responsibility for the spiritual welfare of the British colonies overseas. He was responsible for missions to the West Indies, as well as to India, and towards the end of his life personally funded the sending of scriptures in the language of many peoples as far apart as Greenland and India.

A man of strong moral principle, Porteus was also passionately concerned about what he saw as the moral decay in the nation during the 18th century, and campaigned against trends which he saw as contributory factors, such as pleasure gardens, theatres and the non-observance of the Lord's Day. He enlisted the support of his friend Hannah More, former dramatist and bluestocking, to write tracts against the wickedness of the immorality and licentious behaviour which were common at these events. He vigorously opposed the spread of the principles of the French Revolution as well as what he regarded as the ungodly and dangerous doctrines of Thomas Paine's The Age of Reason. In 1793, at Porteus' suggestion, Hannah More published Village Politics, a short pamphlet designed to counter the arguments of Paine, the first in a whole series of popular tracts designed to oppose what they saw as the prevailing immorality of the day.

== Other reforms ==
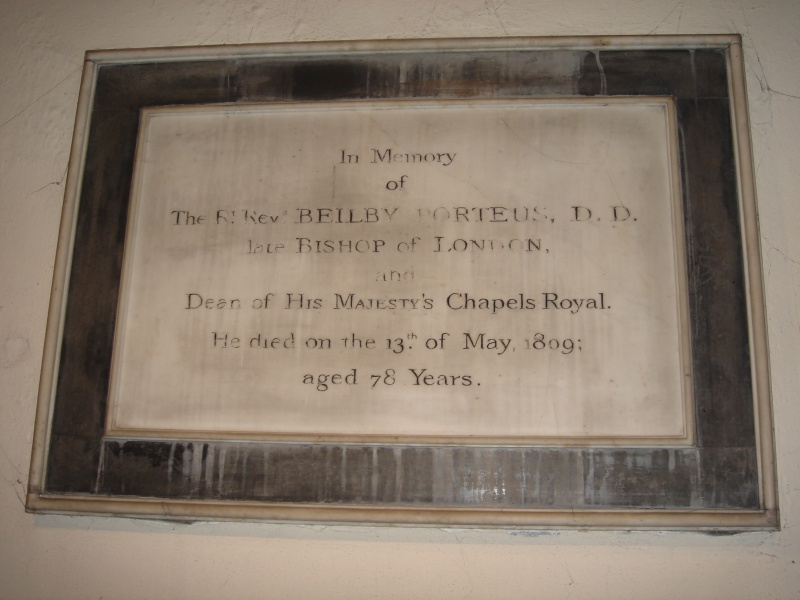
Memorial plaque, All Saints Church, Fulham, London

During much of the following 20 years – a time of national and international political upheaval, Porteus was in a position to influence opinion in the influential circles of the Court, the government, the City of London and the highest echelons of Georgian society. Porteus did this, partly by encouraging debate on subjects as diverse as the slave trade, Catholic emancipation, the pay and conditions of low-paid clergy, the perceived excesses of entertainment taking place on Sundays—and by becoming a vocal supporter of William Wilberforce, Hannah More and the Clapham Sect of evangelical social reformers. He was also appointed as one of the members of the Board for Encouragement of Agriculture and internal Improvement in 1793. He was active in the establishment of Sunday Schools in every parish, an early patron of the Church Missionary Society and one of the founder members of the British and Foreign Bible Society, of which he became vice-president.

He was a well-known advocate of personal Bible-reading. He even gave his name to a system of daily devotions using the Porteusian Bible, published after his death, highlighting the most useful passages. He was responsible for the new innovation of the use of tracts by church organisations. Porteus was a Church of England man however, he eagerly worked with Methodists and dissenters and recognised their major contributions in evangelism and education.

In 1788, George III had again lapsed into one of his periods of mental derangement (now diagnosed as manic depression) to national concern. The following year, a Service of Thanksgiving for his recovery was held in St Paul's Cathedral, at which Porteus himself preached.

The war against Napoleon began in 1794 and was to drag on for another 20 years. Porteus' tenure as Bishop of London saw not only services of thanksgiving for British victories at the Battles of Cape St. Vincent, the Nile and Copenhagen, but the great national outpouring of sorrow at the death of Nelson in 1805, and his state funeral service in St Paul's Cathedral in 1806. As Bishop of London, Porteus may have officiated at some of these services, although it is unlikely that he did so at Nelson's funeral, because of the Admiral's reputation as an adulterer.

After a gradual decline in his health over the previous three years, Bishop Porteus died at Fulham Palace in 1809 and, according to his wishes, was buried at St Mary's church, Sundridge in Kent – a stone's throw from his country retreat in the village – a place to which he had loved to retire every autumn.

== Legacy ==
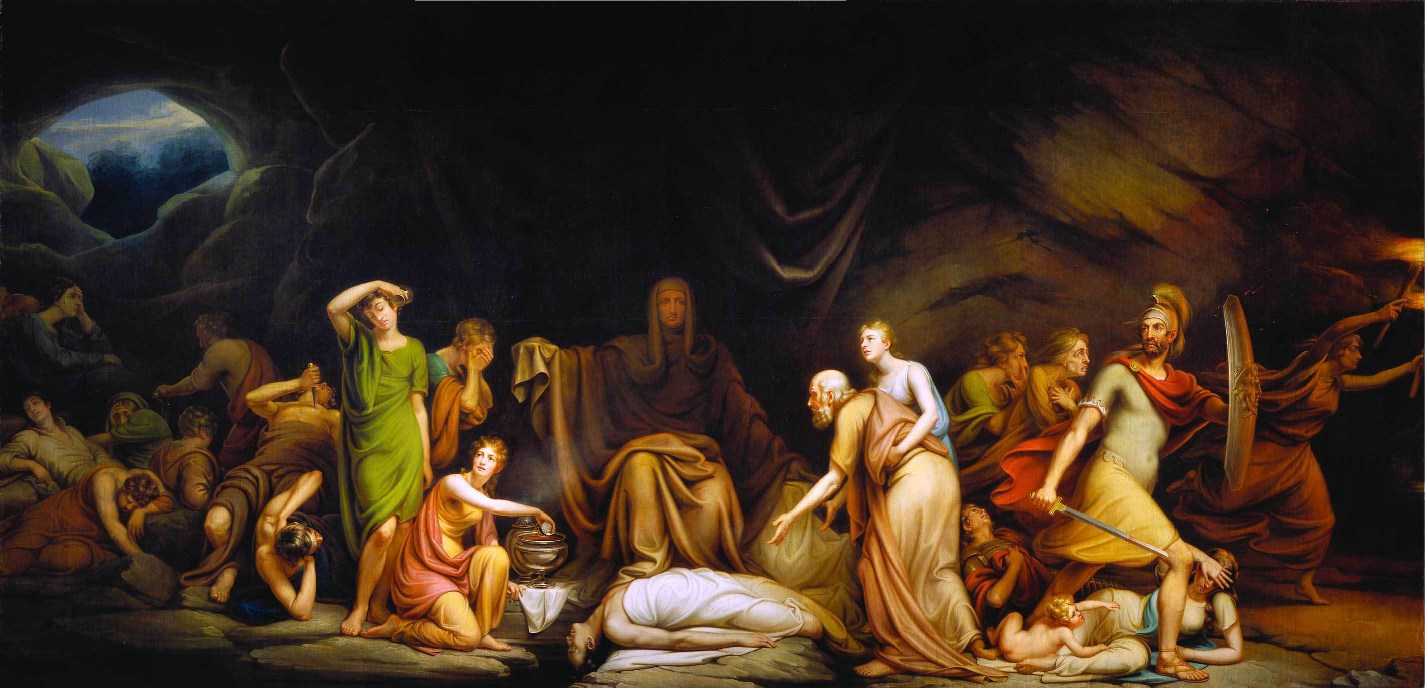
Rembrandt Peale, The Court of Death was based on the poem, Death: A Poetical Essay by Beilby Porteus. The figures in the monumental painting were life-size. Death is surrounded by personifications including Despair, Fever, Consumption, Hypochondria, Apoplexy, Gout, Dropsy, Suicide, Delirium Tremens, Intemperance, Remorse, Pleasure, Pestilence, Famine, War, and Conflagration. To the right, a warrior, an orphaned infant, and a widow show some of the people afflicted. In the foreground, Old Age is supported by Faith.

Beilby Porteus was one of the most significant, church figures of the 18th century. His sermons continued to be read by many, and his reputation as an abolitionist was such that his name was almost as well known in the early 19th century as those of Wilberforce and Thomas Clarkson – but a century later he had become one of the 'forgotten abolitionists'. He is now best known for his poem on Death and, possibly unfairly, as the supposed prototype for the pompous Mr Collins in Jane Austen's Pride and Prejudice.

Perhaps Porteus' most lasting contribution was one for which he is little-known, the Sunday Observance Act 1780 (21 Geo. 3. c. 49) (a response to what he saw as the moral decay of England), which legislated the ways in which the public were allowed to spend their recreation time at weekends for the following 200 years, until the passage of the Sunday Trading Act 1994 (c. 20).

== Works ==
- Death: A Poetical Essay (1759)
- A Review of the Life and Character of Archbishop Secker (1770)
- On a Life of Dissipation (1770)
- Sermons on Several Subjects (1783)
- An Essay on the Transfiguration of Christ (1788)
- The Beneficial Effects of Christianity on the Temporal Concerns of Mankind, Proved from History and from Facts (1806)
- A Letter to the Governors, Legislatures, and Proprietors of Plantations in the British West-India Islands (1808)
- Heureux effets du Christianisme sur la félicité temporelle du genre humain (1808)
- (editor), The Works of Thomas Secker, LL.D. Late Lord Archbishop of Canterbury (1811 edition)
  - volume one
  - volume two
  - volume three
- Lectures on the Gospel of St. Matthew Delivered in the Parish Church of St. James, Westminster, in the Years 1798, 1799, 1800, and 1801 (1823 edition)
- A Summary of the Principal Evidences for the Truth and Divine Origin of the Christian Revelation (1850 edition by James Boyd)

== See also ==
- List of abolitionist forerunners

Church of England titles
Preceded by William Markham	Bishop of Chester; 1776–1787	Succeeded by William Cleaver
Preceded by Robert Lowth	Bishop of London; 1787–1809	Succeeded by John Randolph
