= Bruce Vale =

Populated place in Saint Andrew, Barbados

Coordinates: 13°13′32″N 59°33′55″W

Bruce Vale is a populated place and former estate in the parish of Saint Andrew in Barbados.
