= Greenland, Barbados =

Greenland
- Town
- Location on a map of Barbados parishes
- Coordinates: 13°15′N 59°34′W
- Country: Barbados
- Parish: Saint Andrew
- Elevation: 1 m (3.3 ft)

Population (2012)
  - Total: 508
- Time zone: UTC-4 (Eastern Caribbean Time Zone)
- Area code: +1 246

Greenland is a village in the parish of Saint Andrew in Barbados.
