= All Souls College Library =

University library in Oxford, England

Coordinates: 51.7538°N 1.2533°W

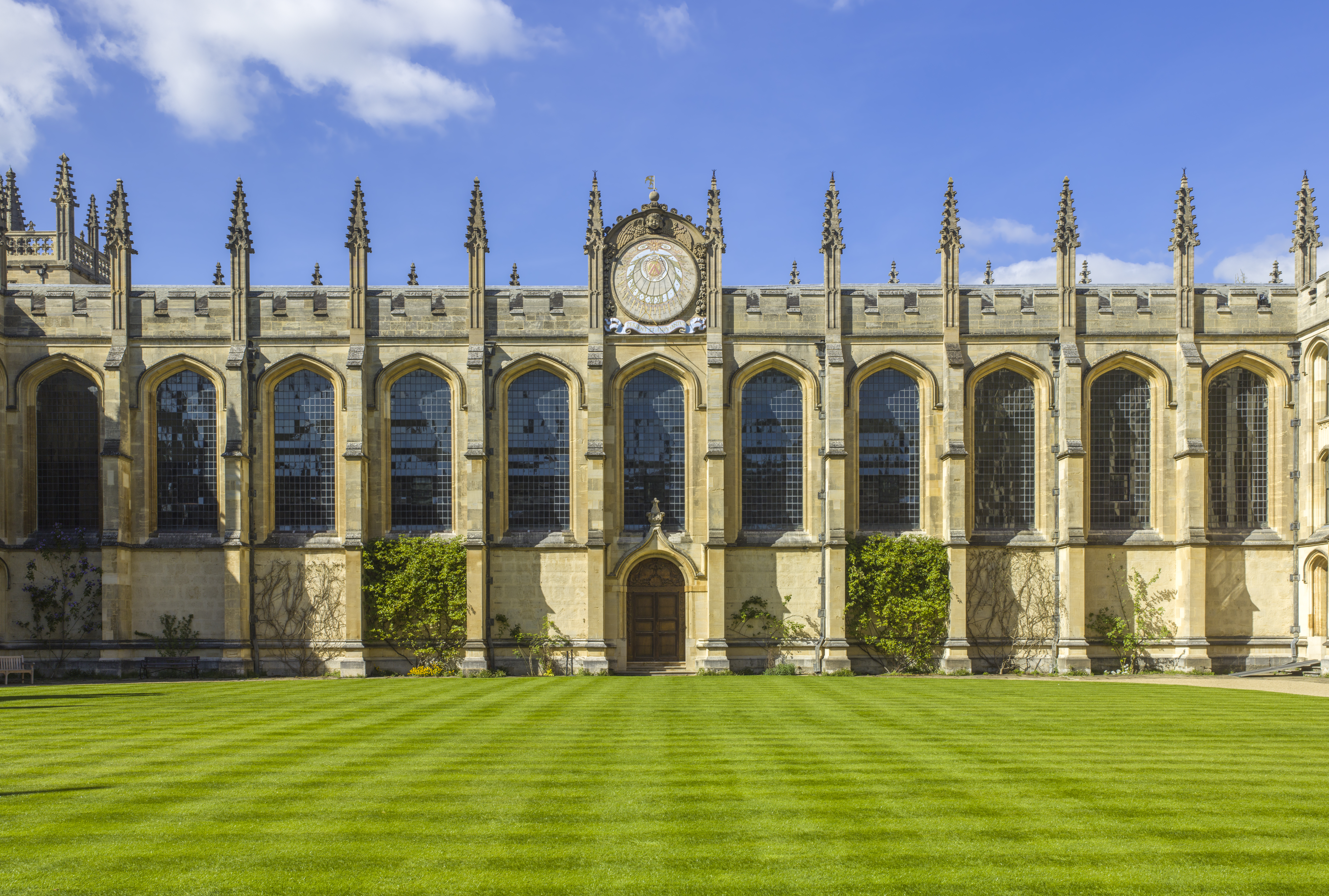
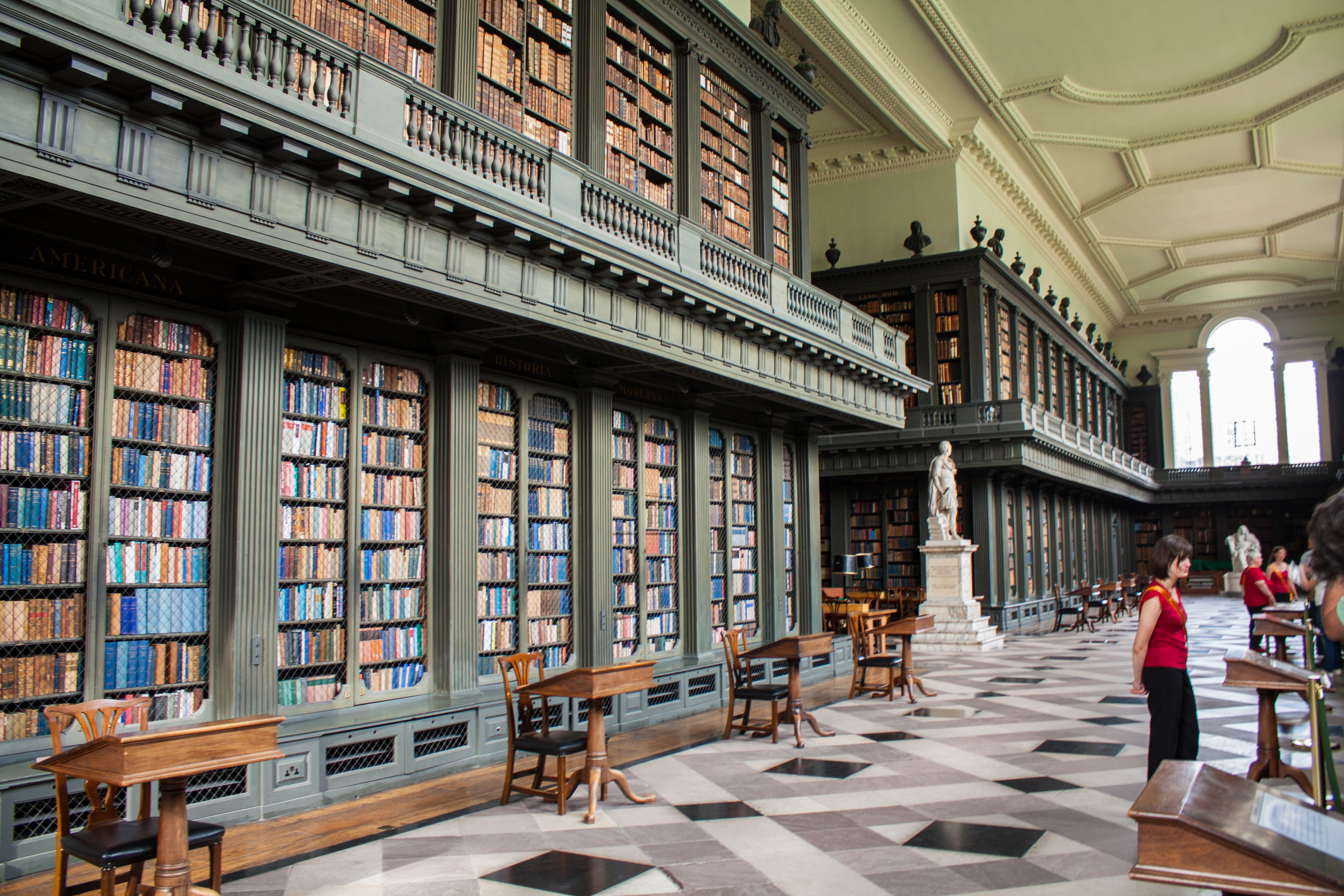
- The library as viewed from All Souls' North Quad The interior of the library with statue of Christopher Codrington
- Location: All Souls College, Oxford, United Kingdom
- Type: Academic library
- Established: 1751

Collection
- Items collected: Books, journals, newspapers, magazines, maps, drawings, manuscripts
- Size: 185,000 items

Access and use
- Access requirements: Open to members of Oxford University and to external scholars by application.

Other information
- Director: Dr Tabitha Tuckett (Fellow Librarian)
- Website: Official website

All Souls College Library (frequently but unofficially called the Codrington Library between the 1840s and 2020) is an academic library in the city of Oxford, England. It is the library of All Souls College, a graduate constituent college of the University of Oxford.

== History ==
The library in its current form was endowed by Christopher Codrington (1668–1710), a fellow of the college who amassed his fortune through his sugar plantations in Barbados, an island in the British West Indies. These were worked by enslaved people of African descent. Codrington bequeathed books worth £6,000, in addition to £10,000 in currency (the equivalent of approximately £1.2 million in modern terms). The library, designed by Nicholas Hawksmoor, begun in 1716, was completed in 1751 and has been in continuous use by scholars since then. It is Grade I listed on the National Heritage List for England.

The first woman to be admitted as a reader to the library was Cornelia Sorabji from Somerville College, at the invitation of Sir William Anson, 3rd Baronet in 1890.

== Collection ==
The modern collection comprises some 185,000 items, about a third of which were produced before 1800. The library's collections are particularly strong in Law, European History, Ecclesiastical History, Military History, and Classics. There is an expanding collection devoted to sociological topics and the History of Science. Unusually for an Oxford college library, access to the library is open to all members of the university (subject to registration). The library contains a significant collection of manuscripts and early printed books, and attracts scholars from around the world.

== Renaming ==
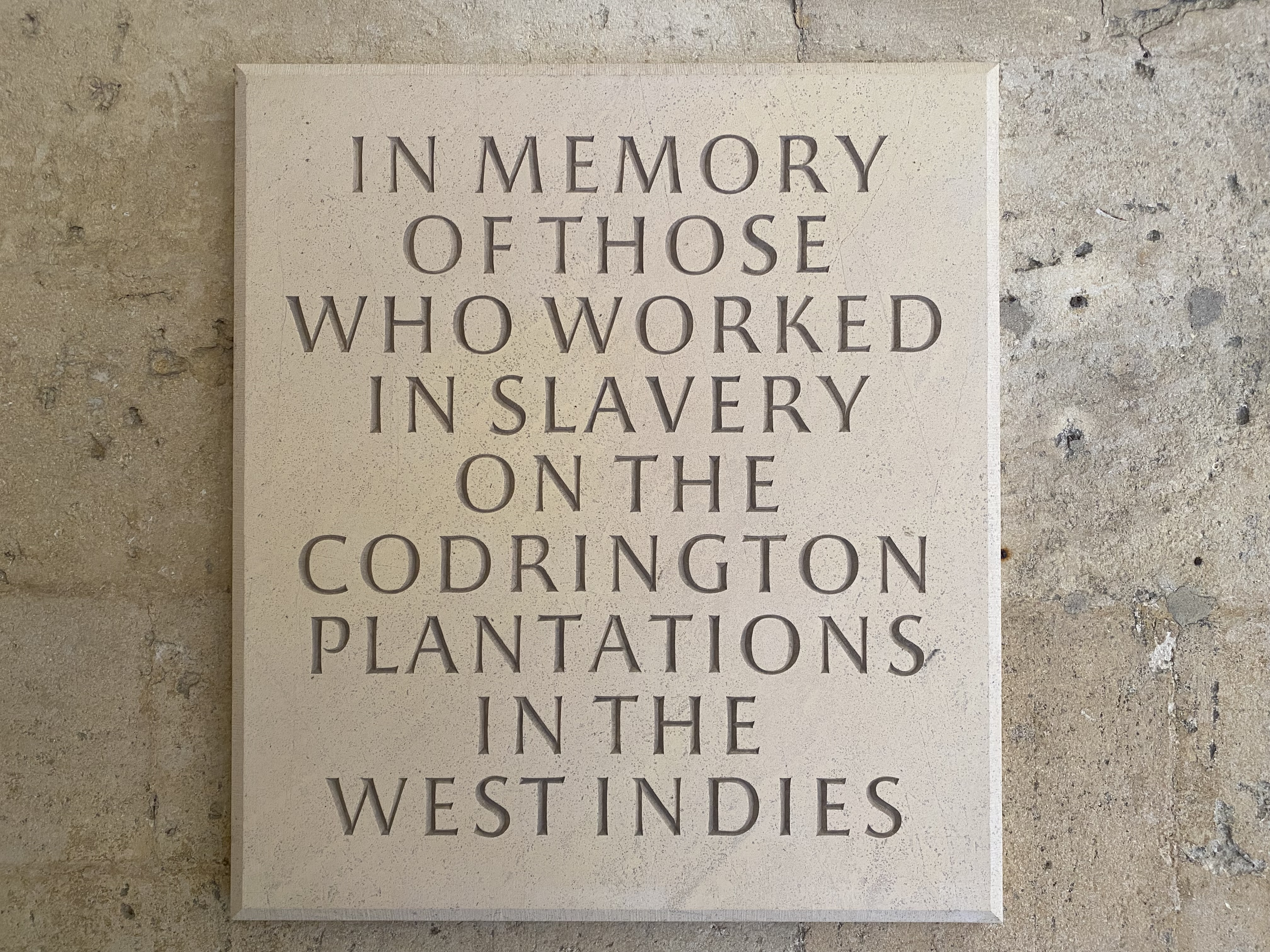
Plaque erected by the entrance to the All Souls College Library to the enslaved people who worked on the Codrington Plantations

In November 2020, the college took the decision to stop referring to the library as the Codrington Library, as part of a set of "steps to address the problematic nature of the Codrington legacy", which derives from exploitation of slave plantations. While the library has since been renamed, a statue of Christopher Codrington remains in the center of the reading room.
