= Elizabeth Thompson (Barbados) =

Barbadian lawyer, politician and diplomat

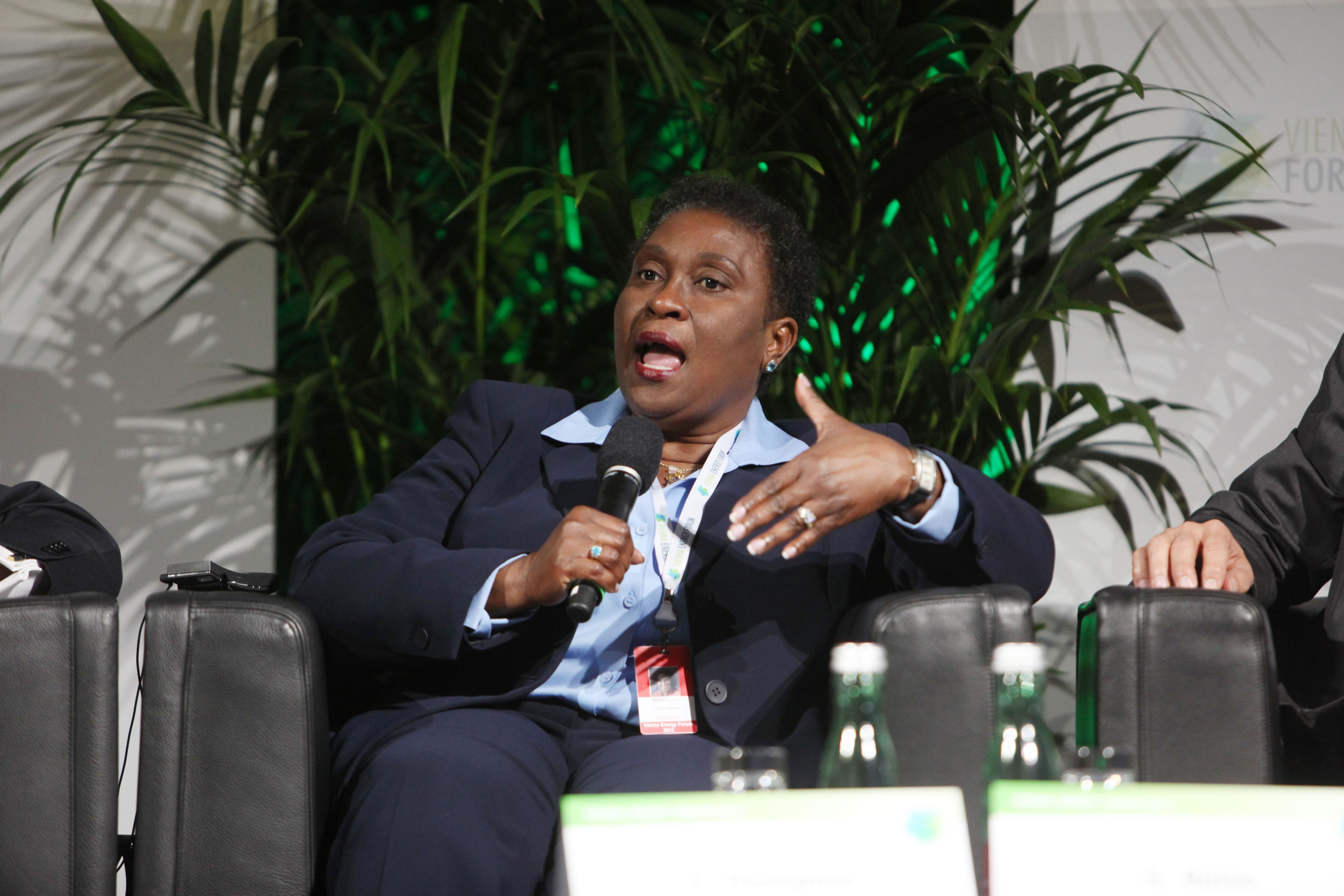
- Thompson in 2013
- Born: 22 November 1961 (age 64); London, England
- Education: University of the West Indies at Cave Hill (LLB); University of Liverpool (MBA); Robert Gordon University (LLM)

Elizabeth Henrietta Thompson, widely known as Liz Thompson (born 22 November 1961) is a Barbadian lawyer, politician and diplomat whose work has included sustainable energy policy. While an elected Member of Parliament representing the Barbados Labour Party for the St. James South constituency from 1994 to 2008. She served as on different occasions as Minister of Health, Minister of Housing, Minister of Physical Development, Minister of Energy and Environment, and Acting Attorney General. She joined the United Nations in 2010, first serving as Assistant Secretary-General of the UN (2010 to 2013), a Special Adviser to the UN President of the General Assembly (2013 and 2014), and as the UN Secretary General's Senior Advisor on Sustainable Energy for All (2014 and 2015). In 2018, she was appointed Permanent Representative of Barbados to the United Nations.

== Early life and education ==
Born on 22 November 1961 in London, Thompson attended Bel Air Preparatory School, St. Michael's Girls' School, and Queen's College. She embarked on her later studies at the University of the West Indies at Cave Hill where she graduated as a Bachelor of Laws. She went on to acquire a Legal Education Certificate from the Hugh Wooding Law School in Trinidad and Tobago, an MBA from the University of Liverpool, and a Master of Laws from Robert Gordon University in Scotland, specializing in energy and environmental law.

== Career ==
After practising as an attorney-at-law, as a representative of the Barbados Labour Party, in 1994 Thompson was elected the Member of Parliament for the St. James South constituency. She was re-elected in 1999 and again in 2003, maintaining the seat until 2003. While serving as a Member of Parliament, for shorter periods she was Minister of Health (1994–1999), Minister of Physical Development and Planning (2001–2004), Minister of Housing (2004–2006), Minister of Environment (1995–1999 and 2001–2008), and Minister of Energy (2006–2008). On several occasions, she also acted as Attorney General. As a minister, she led policy initiatives in the areas of sustainable energy and the environment. She initiated key national projects on waste management, sewerage and biodiversity. In 2008, she targeted 30 per cent of energy production from renewables by 2020. After losing her seat in the 2008 election, she became a Senator and Leader of Minority Business in the upper chamber over the next two years.

From 2016 to 2017, Thompson served as Interim Executive Director of the SUNY-UWI Center for Leadership and Sustainable Development, a UN-inspired initiative of the University of the West Indies and the State University of New York.

Thompson joined the United Nations in 2010, when she was one of the two Executive Coordinators of the United Nations Conference on Sustainable Development in Rio de Janeiro with special responsibility for organizing support for the objectives and outcomes of the conference. In this connection, she contributed to the Higher Education Sustainability Initiative. She later served as Special Adviser to the UN President (2013 and 2014) then as Senior Adviser on Sustainable Energy for All (2014 and 2015). In 2018, she was appointed Permanent Representative of Barbados to the United Nations.

In January 2022, she was appointed senator in the Senate of Barbados in the first senate of Barbados after it became a Republic. She was appointed senator by Mia Mottley.

== Publications ==
In addition to professional works on multilateral negotiations and international development, in 2017 Thompson published the motivational audiobook Make Yourself Happy, which is also available in print format. It consists of 50 chapters which Thompson has described as "stories of struggle and success for 'hope-full' happy living".

== Awards ==
In 2008, under the UN Environment Programme, Thompson was honoured with the Champion of the Earth award.
