= Chalky Mount, Barbados =

Community in Saint Andrew, Barbados

Coordinates: 13°14′N 59°33′W

Chalky Mount is a community in the parish of Saint Andrew in Barbados.
