= Christopher Codrington (colonial administrator) =

English planter and colonial administrator

Colonel Christopher Codrington (c. 1640 – c. 1698) was an English planter and colonial administrator who served as the governor of the Leeward Islands from 1689 to 1699.

== Early life ==
Born about 1640 on Barbados, Codrington was the son of another Christopher Codrington and probably the grandson of Robert Codrington, a landed gentleman with an estate at Dodington, Gloucestershire. His father was a royalist who had arrived in Barbados around 1640, married a sister of James Drax, a leading plantation owner, and acquired an estate in the parish of Saint John. He made a small fortune there, most of which he left to his son when he died in 1656.

== Career ==
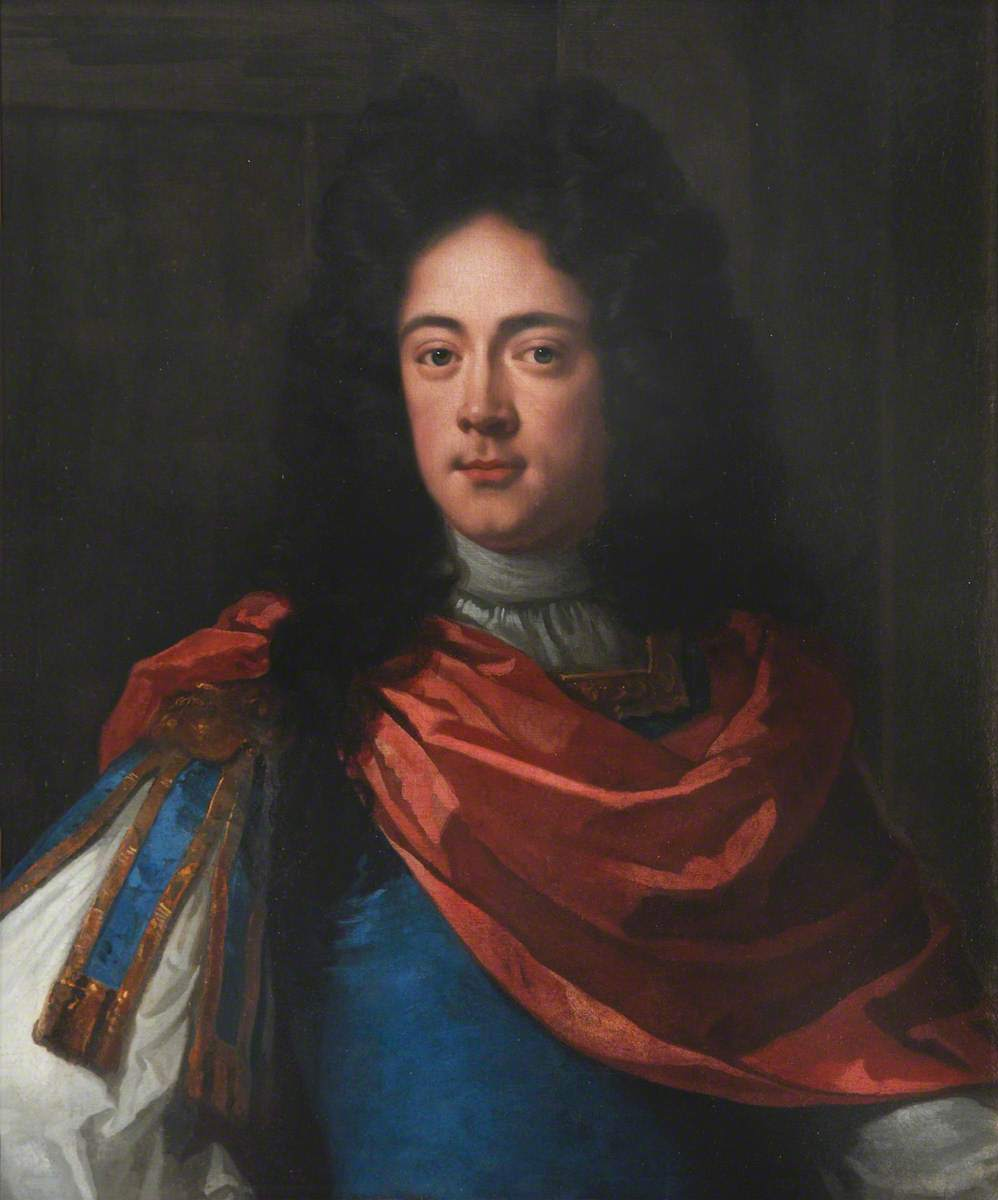
Codrington's son Christopher

In 1663, Codrington and other men of Barbados bought the island of Saint Lucia from native chiefs there. While still in his twenties, he was appointed to the council of Barbados, and then as deputy governor, entrusted with day-to-day administration in the absence of the Governor. In that capacity, he set about building schools and hospitals, suppressing smuggling, and controlling excessive drinking. Codrington was married to a woman named Gertrude. His elder son, another Christopher, was born on Barbados in 1668, and then a younger son called John, who was an "imbecile." In 1669, Codrington was accused of murdering Henry Willoughby, a son of the Governor, Lord Willoughby, in the course of a dispute about Codrington's acquisition of a desirable estate on Barbados called Consetts. Willoughby died suddenly with a "violent burning of the stomach", a few hours after eating a meal with Codrington, and although no wrongdoing was ever proved, Codrington never entirely recovered his good name on the island. He began to trade outside the law and to move his investments away from Barbados.

In 1672, while Willoughby was away on a campaign, Codrington received a report of a rich silver mine on the island of Dominica, which was still in the possession of the Kalinago, and summoned the council of Barbados to ask it to agree that he should seize Dominica "before any other nation should possess the same". He then sent men to negotiate the purchase of the island, and a party to take possession. However, the French Governor General, the Marquis de Baas, promptly had the Englishmen removed from the island and protested that they had broken a treaty with the French of 1660. Although supported by the Council on Trade and Plantations, when Willoughby returned to Barbados Codrington was dismissed from his position and was also removed as commanding officer of a militia regiment. The exact reasons for his removal are unclear, but on 12 November 1672 Lord Willoughby wrote "My late Deputy Coll: Codrington hath harrassed [sic] them to death wth needless improssitions." After leaving the council, between 1674 and 1682 Codrington was elected several times to the Assembly of Barbados and was its Speaker in 1674, 1675, and 1678.

== Later life and death ==
Codrington went on to build up the largest land holdings in Antigua, including his main plantation of Betty's Hope, which he named after his daughter, and also secured a lease of the whole island of Barbuda from the Crown. He was appointed as captain-general of the English Leeward Islands, and in 1683 moved his base of operations to Antigua, where he was an important plantation-owner and was influential in reforms to make the island more like Barbados. By 1685, he had founded the settlement of Codrington on Barbuda and went on to build a stronghold there.

During the Nine Years' War of 1688 to 1697 he led a series of armed conflicts with the French. As a captain general, Codrington found many ways to line his own pockets and was the target of allegations of corruption when he died in 1698, not long after the Peace of Ryswick. His property was inherited by his elder son, another Christopher Codrington. King William III appointed this son to succeed him as captain-general and commander-in-chief of the Leeward Islands. When Codrington's eldest son died in 1710, he left money for his father's remains to be removed to Westminster Abbey, and £500 for a monument to him to be erected there, but only £20 for his own gravestone at All Souls' College, Oxford. However, his wishes for his father's remains were never carried out.

== See also ==
- Codrington Plantations
- Codrington baronets

Legal offices
Preceded by Sir Nathaniel Johnson	Governor of the Leeward Islands; 1689 – 1699	Succeeded by Christopher Codrington
