= The St. Michael School =

Secondary school in Barbados

Coordinates: 13.09699°N 59.60489°W

The St. Michael School is a secondary school in Barbados. It stands on Martindales Road in the parish of Saint Michael, Barbados. The school has over 800 pupils.

Some of the school's notable alumni include the late Dame Nita Barrow, who was the first female (Right Excellent Errol Barrow's sister) governor general of Barbados, and parliamentarian Elizabeth Thompson, as well as Jason Holder Barbados and West Indian cricketer and Niko Terho, former professional footballer and actor best known for his role of Lucas Adams (aka Shep) on the hit medical drama, Gray’s Anatomy. The school's principal is Mrs. Tanya Harding and the deputy is Mrs. Wood.

The school's motto is "Nisi Auxilio Dei Nihil," Latin for "Nothing Without Help From God".

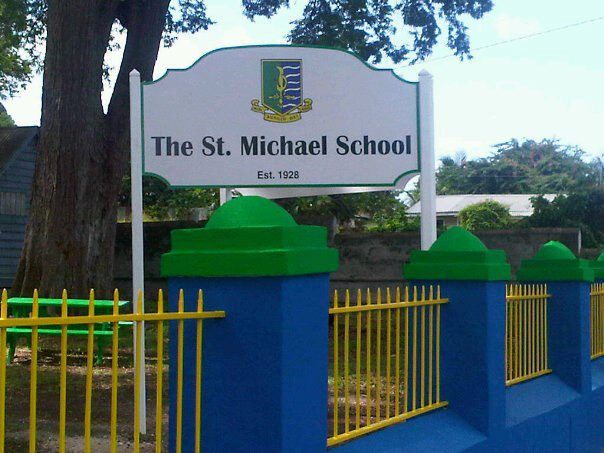
Entrance sign

== History and achievements ==
The school was founded by the St. Michael's Vestry and officially opened on 7 May 1928. It was originally a girls' school. In 1979 the first class of boys were admitted to the school

In 2007, a two-year renovation programme came to an end.

In 2007, a student won a gold medal at the CARIFTA Games.

In 2008, the school became the only one on the island to place three students in one sitting to two campuses of the United World Colleges (the UWC Movement). Two students went to the United World College Costa Rica (Santa Ana, Costa Rica) and one to the United World College-USA (Montezuma, USA). It was the largest placement by a single secondary school in Barbados. However, in 2009, the school did not place any of its students into the UWC Movement. The school has a sixth form.

== School structure ==
The St. Michael School is divided into four competitive houses, named after queens: Boadicea (blue), Victoria (red), Anne (yellow) and Elizabeth (purple).

== Discipline ==
The school has a prefect system, under which students help with disciplinary and school matters, run by a head boy and head girl with their deputies, and five senior prefects. It is considered a well organized school and run by Tanya Harding, the head of the school. In the past years it has accomplished much, notably the installment of bleachers and water systems. It has also led the charge against unhealthy habits and has been commended for its revolutionary initiative.

== Notable alumni ==
- Dame Nita Barrow - former governor general
- Jason Holder
- Grace Hackett, Ph.D. - Mezzo Soprano
- Ezra Moseley, Cricketer
- Leah Martindale Olympic Swimmer
- Gabriel Burnett Olympic Sprint Hurdler
- Leslie Reifer International Cricket Umpire
- Marion Vernese Williams, former Governor of the Central Bank of Barbados
- Niko Terho, Actor
- Haydn Lewis, Professional Tennis Player
