= Romel Springer =

Barbadian politician

Member of the House of Assembly of Barbados for Saint Andrew
- Incumbent
- Assumed office 19 January 2022
- Prime Minister: Mia Mottley
- Preceded by: George Payne

Personal details
- Party: Barbados Labour Party

Romel O. Springer is a Barbadian politician from the Barbados Labour Party (BLP).

== Political career ==
In the 2022 Barbadian general election, Springer was elected in Saint Andrew. He serves as Parliamentary Secretary in the Ministry of Transport and Works.
