= Codrington Plantations =

Two sugarcane-producing estates on Barbados

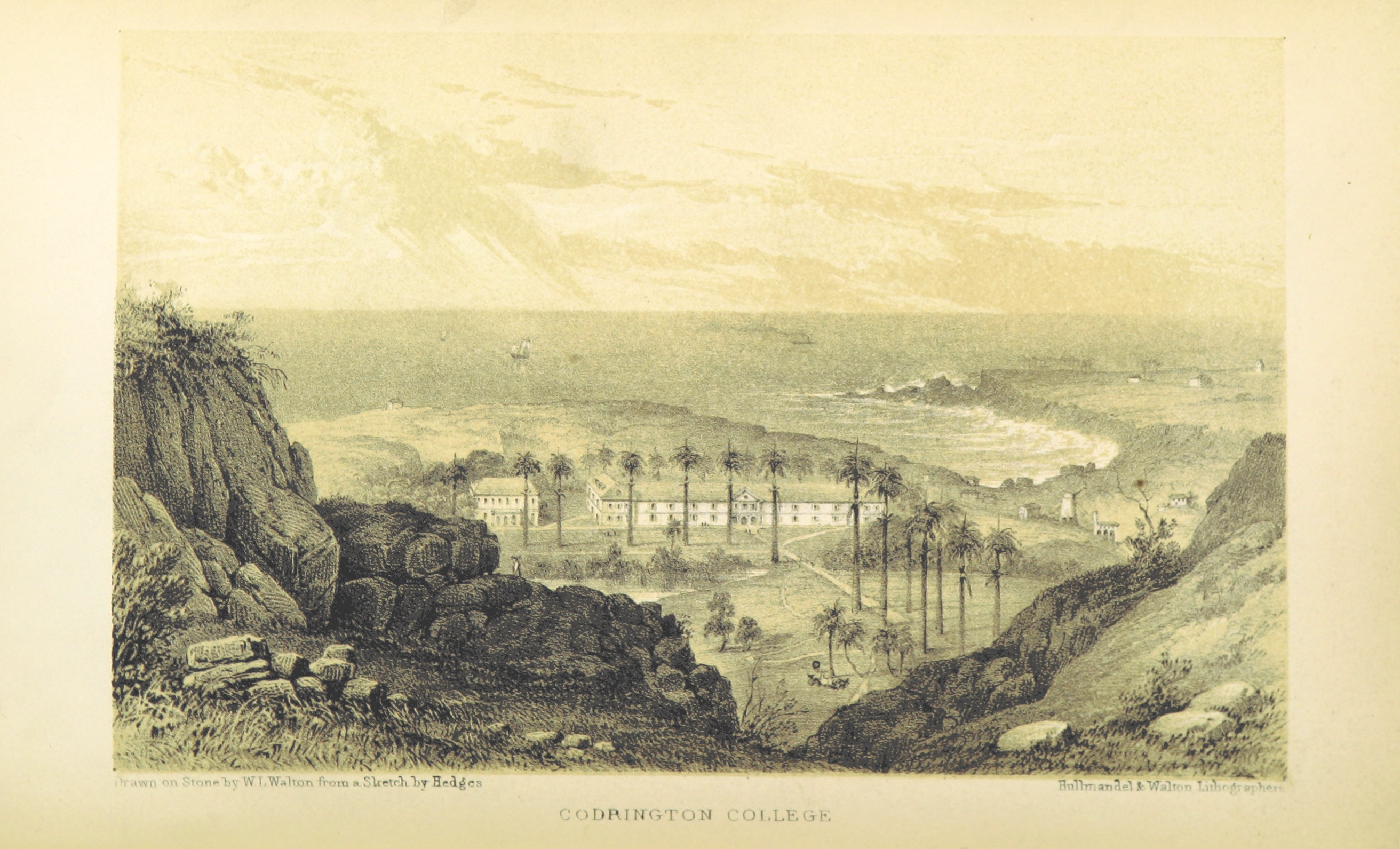
- Codrington College, Barbados
- Location: Barbados
- Area: 763 acres (309 ha)
- Established: 17th century

The Codrington Plantations were two historic sugarcane producing estates on the island of Barbados, established in the 17th century by Christopher Codrington (c. 1640–1698) and his father of the same name. Sharing the characteristics of many plantations of the period in their exploitation of slavery, their particular significance was as a part of a charitable bequest in 1710, on the death of the third Christopher Codrington (1668–1710), to the Society for the Propagation of the Gospel in Foreign Parts (SPG).

The history of the plantations illustrates the 18th century Church of England's dependence on the financial support of local landowners for its Christian missionary work in the West Indies, and, until the growth of Abolitionism, its institutional unwillingness to address issues relating to slavery.

== Location ==
The two estates named Codrington's and Consett's were located in the parish of St. John on the eastern side of Barbados and covered 763 acres (309 ha) of sugarcane planting. Codrington's will, first drawn up in 1702, also notes three windmills with associated sugar manufacturing facilities on the land, 315 indentured slaves and 100 head of cattle.

== Codrington bequest and the foundation of Codrington College ==
Upon the death of Christopher Codrington in 1710, the two estates were left to the Society for the Propagation of the Gospel to fund the establishment of college in Barbados stating his "Desire to have the Plantations Continued Entire and three hundred negros at Least always Kept there on, and a Convenient Number of Professors and Scholars maintain'd." Codrington directed that a portion of his charitable bequest be used to educate the enslaved population of Barbados, but this was a gesture effectively blocked by the objections of fellow planters.

Although the monastic aspect of the college was soon abandoned, the college was constructed over an extended period from 1714 to 1742. The college buildings today serve as a seminary for the Church in the Province of the West Indies, an autonomous member province of the worldwide Anglican Communion.

Through his bequest Christopher Codrington was also a significant benefactor of All Souls College, Oxford, donating books worth £6,000, and £10,000 in funding for the construction of the Codrington Library.

== Conditions on the plantations ==
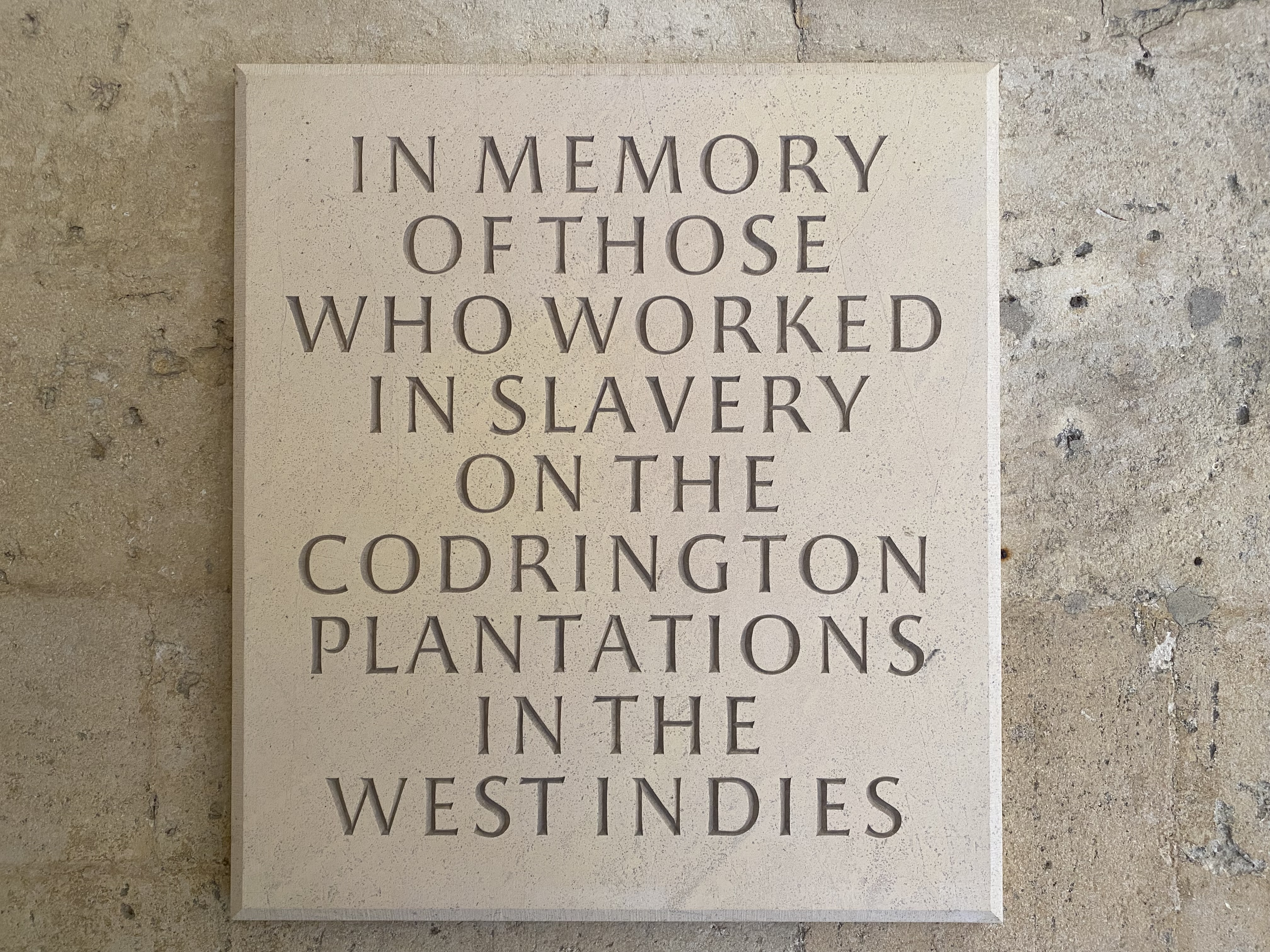
Plaque erected by the entrance to the All Souls College Library, Oxford to the slaves who worked on the Codrington Planations

The plantations were run by managers on behalf of the SPG, and their operational oversight was nominally supervised by a board of trustees of the society headed by the Archbishop of Canterbury and a committee of Church of England bishops. The plantations were reliant on regular supply of new slaves from West Africa; due to ill-health, smallpox, dysentery and mistreatment, four out of every 10 slaves bought by the plantation in 1740 were reported to have died within three years.

Initially slaves were branded with the word "Society" on their chests with a hot iron. Milton Meltzer explains that the branding practice throughout the sugar plantations was that "Already branded once by the trader, the slaves were branded a second time with their new owner's initials." On branding at Codrington, Hochschild says "For nearly a decade, Codrington officials tried to reduce escapes by branding all slaves on their chests. In the end, though, the chief deterrent was the lash, plus, at times, an iron collar and a straitjacket." Branding, the policy of one overseer and not continuous official policy of the managers, ceased within a decade of the Church taking on ownership of the plantation.

It has been suggested that there was a deliberate "work to death" policy in operation, as was commonly the case on other plantations and in South America. On this question, Hochschild makes the point ... "in 1746 one third of Africans died within three years of arrival in West Indies, from the ordeal of the middle passage, and the shock of adjusting to the new life, foods, and diseases." There is no specific evidence that on the Codrington plantation harsh treatment of slaves by its managers was the cause of the high death rate.

Hochschild goes on to say, "At Codrington, as throughout the Caribbean, new slaves from Africa were first "seasoned" for three years, receiving extra food and light work assignments. Slaves were vulnerable during this early traumatic period when they were most likely to die of disease, to run away ... or to commit suicide. If you survived those three years, you were regarded as ready for the hardest labour." Hochschild provides further detail about the policies of the SPG's managers, saying that by 1826, "As a result of changes, the Church of England's Codrington plantation, for example, had improved food, housing, clothing, and working conditions, and built a small hospital for sick and pregnant slaves."

== Abolition of the slave holdings ==
It was the situation in the West Indies and at the SPG's Codrington Plantations in particular, which prompted Beilby Porteus, Bishop of Chester and later Bishop of London, to use the opportunity of preaching the 1783 anniversary sermon of the SPG at St Mary-le-Bow, Cheapside, London, to issue a call to the Church of England to cease its involvement in the slave trade. It urged formulation of a policy to draw attention to and improve the conditions of the enslaved Africans in Barbados. At that time slaveholders also used Biblical justifications for slavery.

The Church of England relinquished its slaveholdings only after the Slavery Abolition Act 1833. When the emancipation of slaves eventually took place, the government paid compensation under the Slave Compensation Act 1837 to their owners. The SPG's Codrington Plantations received £8,823. 8s. 9d in compensation for 411 slaves. According to the accounts of Codrington College, the compensation funds were paid into the treasury of the college. Although Codrington apparently bequeathed the plantation to SPG partly to provide education for slaves, when the college was opened in 1745 it was for white boys only, and it is not clear how much of its resources it dedicated to educating former slaves after emancipation.
