= Christopher Codrington =

English Army officer, planter and colonial administrator (1668–1710)

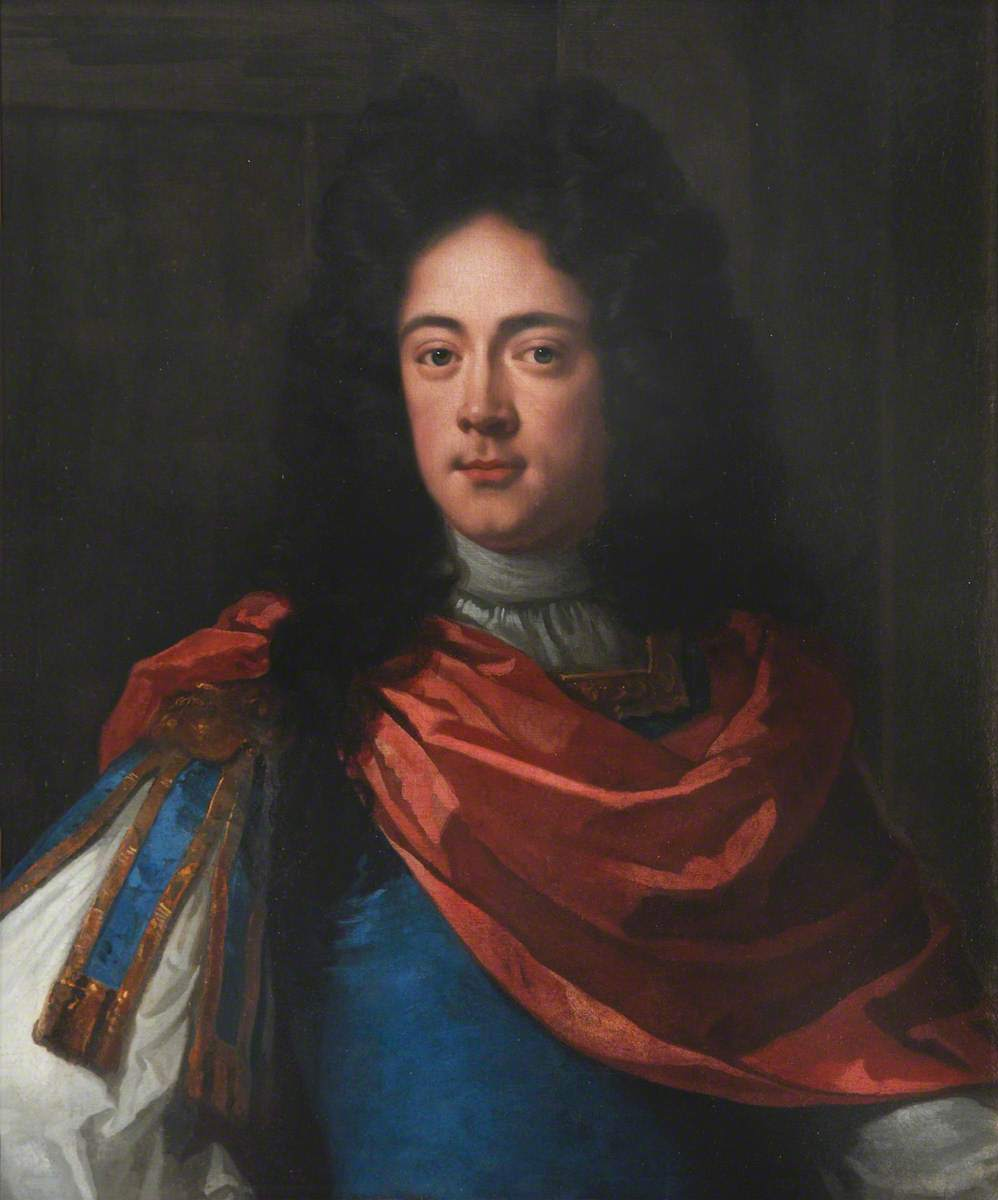
- Portrait after James Thornhill

Governor of the Leeward Islands
- In office 1699–1704
- Monarchs: William III (1699–1702); Queen Anne (1702–1704)
- Preceded by: Christopher Codrington
- Succeeded by: John Johnson

Personal details
- Born: c. 1668 Barbados
- Died: 7 April 1710 (aged 41–42) Barbados
- Resting place: All Souls College, Oxford
- Spouse: Mauldline Morange
- Children: William Codrington
- Education: Christ Church, Oxford
- Occupation: Army officer, planter, colonial administrator

Military service
- Allegiance: England
- Branch/service: English Army
- Years of service: 1693–1703
- Rank: Lieutenant colonel
- Unit: 1st Regiment of Foot Guards
- Battles/wars: Nine Years' War; Siege of Namur (1695); War of the Spanish Succession; Siege of Guadeloupe

Lieutenant-Colonel Christopher Codrington (c. 1668 – 7 April 1710) was an English Army officer, planter and colonial administrator who served as governor of the Leeward Islands from 1699 to 1704. Born on Barbados into the planter class, he inherited one of the largest sugar plantations in the colony. Codrington travelled to Europe during the late-17th century and served in the Nine Years' War and War of the Spanish Succession, taking part in numerous engagements.

After dying in 1710, his will and testament established and endowed Codrington College with his estates in Barbados and Barbuda. Codrington's will also endowed the Codrington Library at All Souls College, Oxford with a gift of books and money. In November 2020, his name was removed from the library as a result of the George Floyd protests due to Codrington's ownership of slaves.

== Early life ==
Christopher Codrington was born in the English colony of Barbados c. 1668, the eldest son of Christopher Codrington and his wife Gertrude. The Codrington Plantations were one of the largest in Barbados and the family was extremely wealthy. He had a younger brother, who suffered from mental disability. Codrington never married, although he had a natural mixed-race son, William, from a relationship with a Black woman named Mauldline Morange. William was left £500 in his father's will and became a plantation owner in the English colony of Jamaica.

== Career ==
Later described by Edmund Burke as "by far ... the most distinguished ornament Barbados ever produced", Codrington was academically talented; educated in England, he studied at Christ Church, Oxford, and was elected to All Souls College in 1690. Part of an intellectual circle that included Charles Boyle and Joseph Addison, he became known as an avid book collector.

In 1693, he returned to the West Indies to take part in an unsuccessful attack on the French possession of Martinique, before serving in Flanders during the Nine Years' War. Having fought with distinction at Huy and the siege of Namur in 1695, William III gave him a commission as captain in the English Army's 1st Regiment of Foot Guards. This was often a largely honorary post, since only 16 of the nominal 24 companies were actually formed; under the practice known as double-ranking, Guards officers held a second, higher army position and Codrington ranked as a lieutenant colonel.

His father died shortly after the Peace of Ryswick ended the Nine Years War in 1697, and he was appointed Governor of the Leeward Islands in 1699. He became embroiled in a number of local disputes and accusations of abuse of power, which were investigated by Parliament. He was exonerated just before the War of the Spanish Succession began in 1702; after successfully retaking Saint Kitts from the French, he resigned from the English army after leading a failed attack on Guadeloupe in 1703, which severely damaged his health. His attempts to re-enter politics proved unsuccessful and he spent the rest of his life in retirement on his Barbadian estates.

== Legacies ==
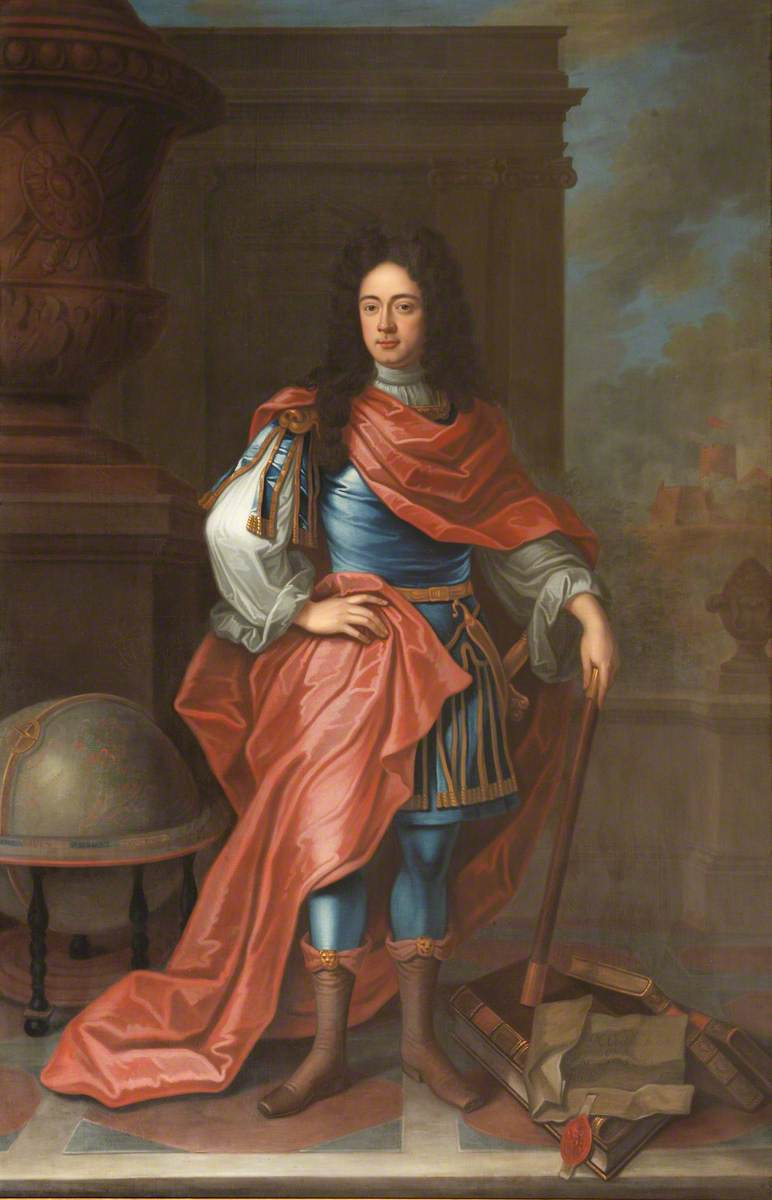
Portrait of Codrington by James Thornhill

After his death on 7 April 1710, Codrington's body was brought to England and buried on 19 June that year in All Souls Chapel; his will left £10,000 and £6,000 worth of books to endow the Christopher Codrington library in All Souls College, which includes his statue by Sir Henry Cheere. In January 2021, his name was removed from the library due to Codrington's ownership of slaves, and a plaque was placed outside commemorating the enslaved workers who were held on his plantations.

His other legacies included £1,500 for a monument to his father in Westminster Abbey, while the Codrington Plantations and part of Barbuda were left to the Society for the Propagation of the Gospel in Foreign Parts to establish a college in Barbados. Delays caused by legal challenges meant that Codrington College was not completed until 1745, and was initially confined to white students. It remains an Anglican theological school and is now part of the University of the West Indies. The Codrington School, first established in 1917 before closing in the 1990s, was reopened in 2002 as an International Baccalaureate school.

The Codrington baronets retained ownership of Betty's Hope plantation in Antigua until 1944.

== See also ==
- James Weatherhill, a pirate whom Codrington was accused of colluding with and assisting

== Bibliography ==
- Chisholm, Hugh, ed. (1911). "Codrington, Christopher" . Encyclopædia Britannica. Vol. 6 (11th ed.). Cambridge University Press. p. 636.
- "Codrington College". Codrington.org.
- Dalton, Charles (1896). English army lists and commission registers, 1661–1714, Volume IV. Eyre & Spottiswoode.
- Mandelbrote, Scott (2020). "Codrington, Christopher (1668–1710)". Oxford Dictionary of National Biography (online ed.). Oxford University Press. doi:10.1093/ref:odnb/5795. (Subscription, Wikipedia Library access or UK public library membership required.)
- Parker, Mathew (2011). The Sugar Barons; Family, Corruption, Empire and War. Windmill Books. ISBN 978-0099558453.
- Shaw, Annie (6 January 2021). "Oxford University's All Souls College drops Christopher Codrington's name from its library". The Art Newspaper.
- Springman, Michael (2008). The Guards Brigade in the Crimea (2014 ed.). Pen and Sword. ISBN 978-1844156788.
- "The Codrington School; International School of Barbados". The Codrington School.

Legal offices
Preceded by Christopher Codrington	Governor of the Leeward Islands; 1699 – 1704	Succeeded by John Johnson
