= Saint Andrew, Barbados =

Saint Andrew
- Parish
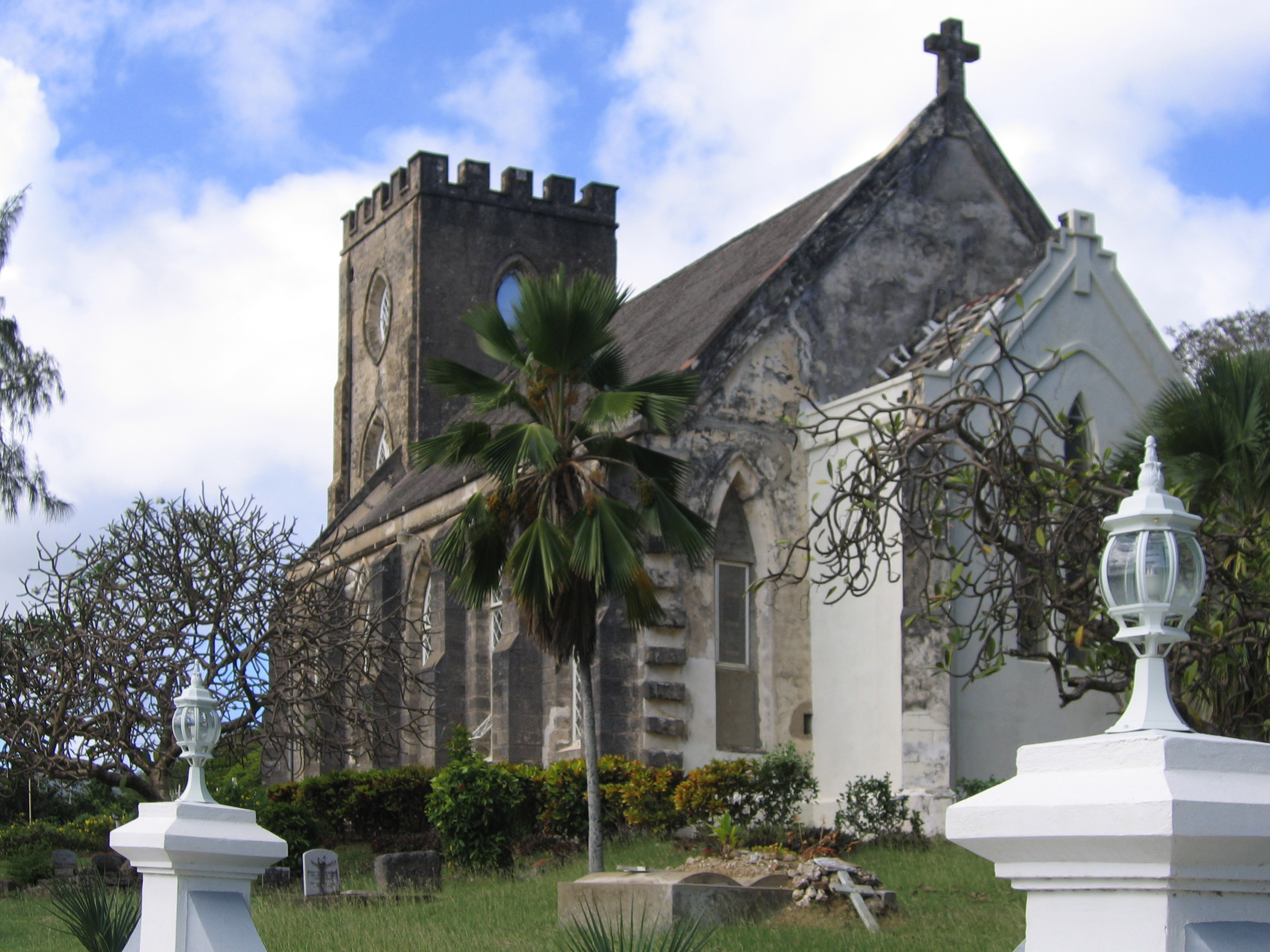
- Saint Andrew´s Parish Church

- Map of Barbados showing Saint Andrew
- Coordinates: 13°14′N 59°34′W
- Country: Barbados
- Largest village: Belleplaine

Government
  - Type: Parliamentary democracy
  - Parliamentary seats: 1

Area
  - Total: 36 km^{2} (14 sq mi)

Population (2010 census)
  - Total: 5,139
  - Density: 140/km^{2} (370/sq mi)
- ISO 3166 code: BB-02

St. Andrew is one of eleven parishes of Barbados. It is situated in the northeastern area of the country.

Saint Andrew is one of the more scenic parts of the island owing to its physical makeup of green rolling hills. The parish of Saint Andrew also has the country's highest natural elevation, the 336 m (1,102 ft) Mount Hillaby at the southern part of the parish.

The parish is named after the patron saint, Saint Andrew, who is also the basis of the name for Barbados' former national award "The Order of Saint Andrew" and also the shape of the cross formed by two sugar cane stalks in the national Coat of Arms of Barbados.

During the colonial years under Britain, the British thought the area resembled the hills and fields of Scotland. This led to parts of the Parish of Saint Andrew today being nicknamed the "Scotland District". During the 1990s the Government of the time proposed a "Greenland Landfill" located within the parish. However, because of Saint Andrew's fragile environment and its possibility of future soil erosion the opening of the completed landfill has yet to come-about after almost a decade.

Saint Andrew lies on the eastern coastline of Barbados, where the Atlantic Ocean tends to be more turbulent. As part of Barbados' attempts to preserve the environment the parish is also home to several natural reserves including the Turner's Hall Woods.

== Geography ==
=== Populated places ===
The parish contains the following towns, villages, localities, settlements, communities and hamlets:

- Babylon
- Barclays Park
- Bawdens
- Baxters
- Baxters Hill
- Belle Hill
- Belleplaine
- Benab
- Boarded Hall
- Breedy's
- Bruce Vale
- Chalky Mount
- Cheltenham
- Cleland
- Douglin
- Greenland
- Gregg Farm
- Haggatts
- Hillaby
- Hoytes
- Lakes
- Lakes Beach
- Less Beholden
- Long Pond
- Morgan Lewis
- Morgan Lewis Beach
- Mose Bottom
- Mount All
- Mount Hillaby
- Rock Hall
- Rock Hall Village
- Saint Simons
- Sand Quarry
- Sedge Pond
- Shorey Village
- Swanns
- The Chase
- Trio Path
- Turners Hall
- Turners Hall Woods
- Walkers
- Walkers Savannah
- White Hill
- Windy Hill

=== Parishes bordering Saint Andrew ===
- Saint James - West
- Saint Joseph - Southeast
- Saint Peter - North
- Saint Thomas - South

=== Defined boundaries ===
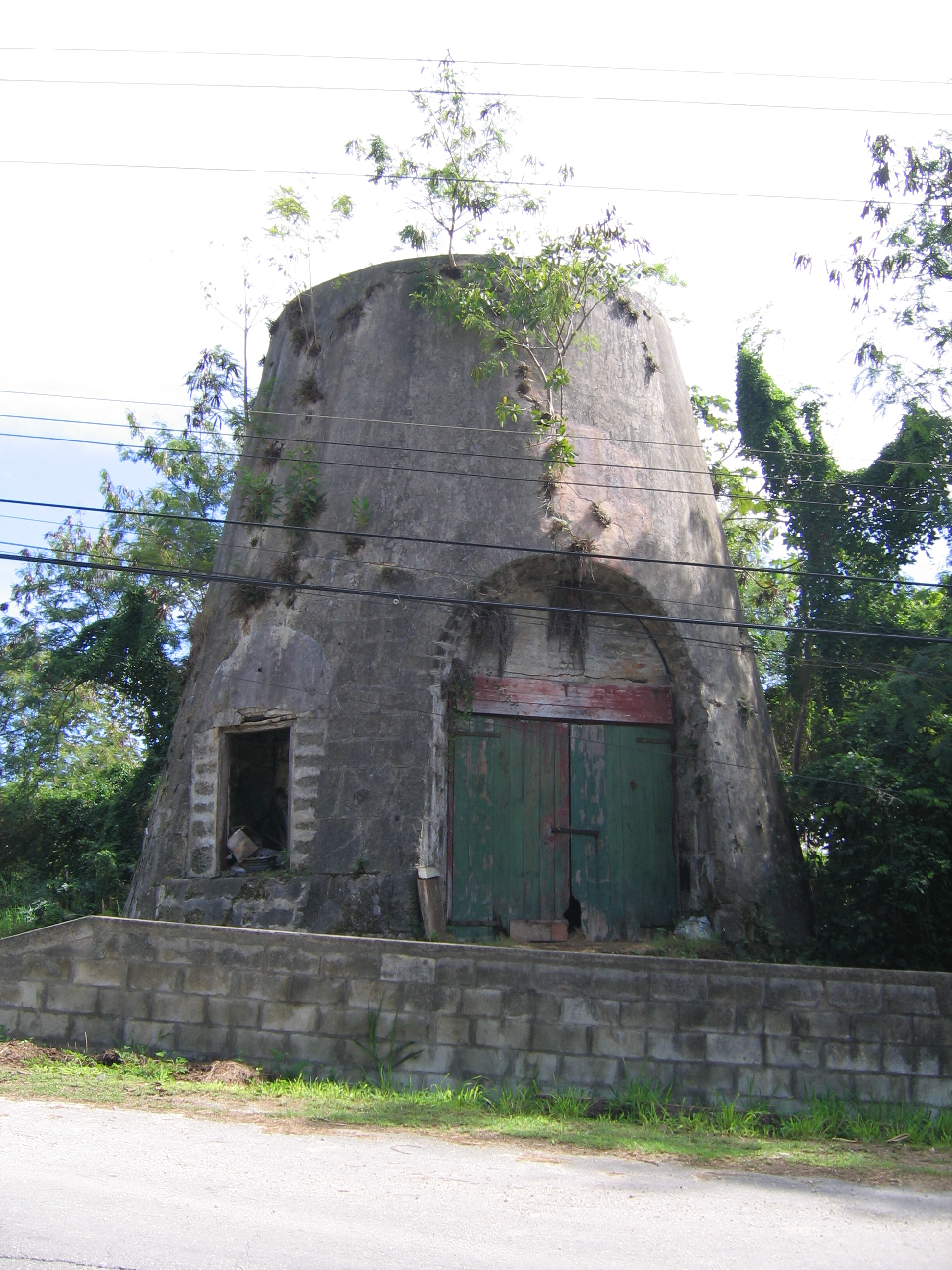
Old millwall in Saint Andrew

- With St. James: – Starting from the meeting point of the parishes of St. Peter, St. James and St. Andrew; then in a southerly direction along the line joining this point to the centre of the old millwall at Springhead Plantation; then in a straight line to a monument (B.5) at the acute bend in the public road at Gregg Farm: then in a southerly direction along this road to where it crosses the gully (monument (B.6) on the western side of the road): then along this gully to its junction with three other gullies. This is the meeting point of the parishes of St. James, St. Andrew and St. Thomas.
- With St. Joseph: – Starting from the meeting point of the parishes of St. Andrew, St. Thomas and St. Joseph and proceeding generally north-easterly along Highway 2 to the junction with the public road known as Coggins Hill; then in an easterly and south-easterly direction along this road to its junction with an unclassified road leading to Cambridge; then along this road in a northerly then easterly and northerly direction to its end at a gully; then north eastwards along this gully to the culvert where it crosses the East Coast Road and then to the sea.
- With St. Peter: – Starting from the meeting point of the parishes of St. Peter, St. James and St. Andrew and continuing in an easterly direction to its junction with the public road leading from Rock Hall Plantation to Rock Hall Village: then in a north-westerly direction along this public road to its junction at Rock Hall Tenantry with a track leading to Roebuck Village; then along this track in a generally northerly direction to its junction at Roebuck Village with the unclassified public road leading from Four Hills Plantation to Indian Ground; then continuing in a generally northerly direction along this road to its junction with the public road leading from Orange Hill Plantation to Welchtown Plantation; then continuing in a northerly direction along this road to its junction at Welchtown Plantation with the public road leading from Farley Hill to Portland; then in a north-westerly direction along this road to its junction at Portland with the public road called Highway 1; then in an easterly and northerly direction along Highway 1 to the junction at Diamond Comer with the public road called Highway B; then in a generally easterly direction along Highway B passing through Nicholas and Cherry Tree Hill to the junction of this road with the public road leading to Boscobelle; then in a north-easterly direction along this road to the junction with the private road leading to Fosters Funland; then in a generally easterly direction along this road and along the southern section of the loop at the end; and then continuing in an easterly direction to the sea.
- With St. Thomas: – Starting from the meeting point of the parishes of St. James, St. Andrew and St. Thomas and proceeding along the gully leading in a south-easterly direction to a point in line with the tenantry road at Hillaby Village; then in a direct line to the centre line of this road and along this road to the point where it branches: then in a southerly and south-easterly direction to the junction of this road with the public road; then in a north-easterly direction along this road to the junction with Hillaby Tenantry Road; then along Hillaby Tenantry Road to its end at the triangulation station known as “Hillaby” (S.15); then in a south-easterly direction along a line joining this point to a monument (B.7) on the western side of the public road at Spring Vale called Highway 2 and to the centre line of this road. This is the meeting point of the parishes of St. Andrew, St. Thomas and St. Joseph.

== Politics ==
Saint Andrew covers one geographical constituency for the House of Assembly:

- Saint Andrew (Barbados Parliament constituency)

== See also ==
- Edna Ermyntrude Bourne - first woman to be elected to the House of Assembly of Barbados, representing Saint Andrew.
