= Belleplaine =

Coordinates: 13°15′N 59°34′W

BellePlaine
- Village
- Interactive map of BellePlaine
- Country: Barbados
- Parish: Saint Andrew
- Subdivition into large tracts of land: 1767
- Time zone: UTC-4 (Eastern Caribbean Time Zone)
- Area code: +1 246

Belleplaine is a village in the parish of Saint Andrew in Barbados.

== Etymology ==
The name Belleplaine means "Beautiful Plains", which is believed to be delivered from Coleridge family.
