= The Rhodes Colossus =

British 1892 editorial cartoon

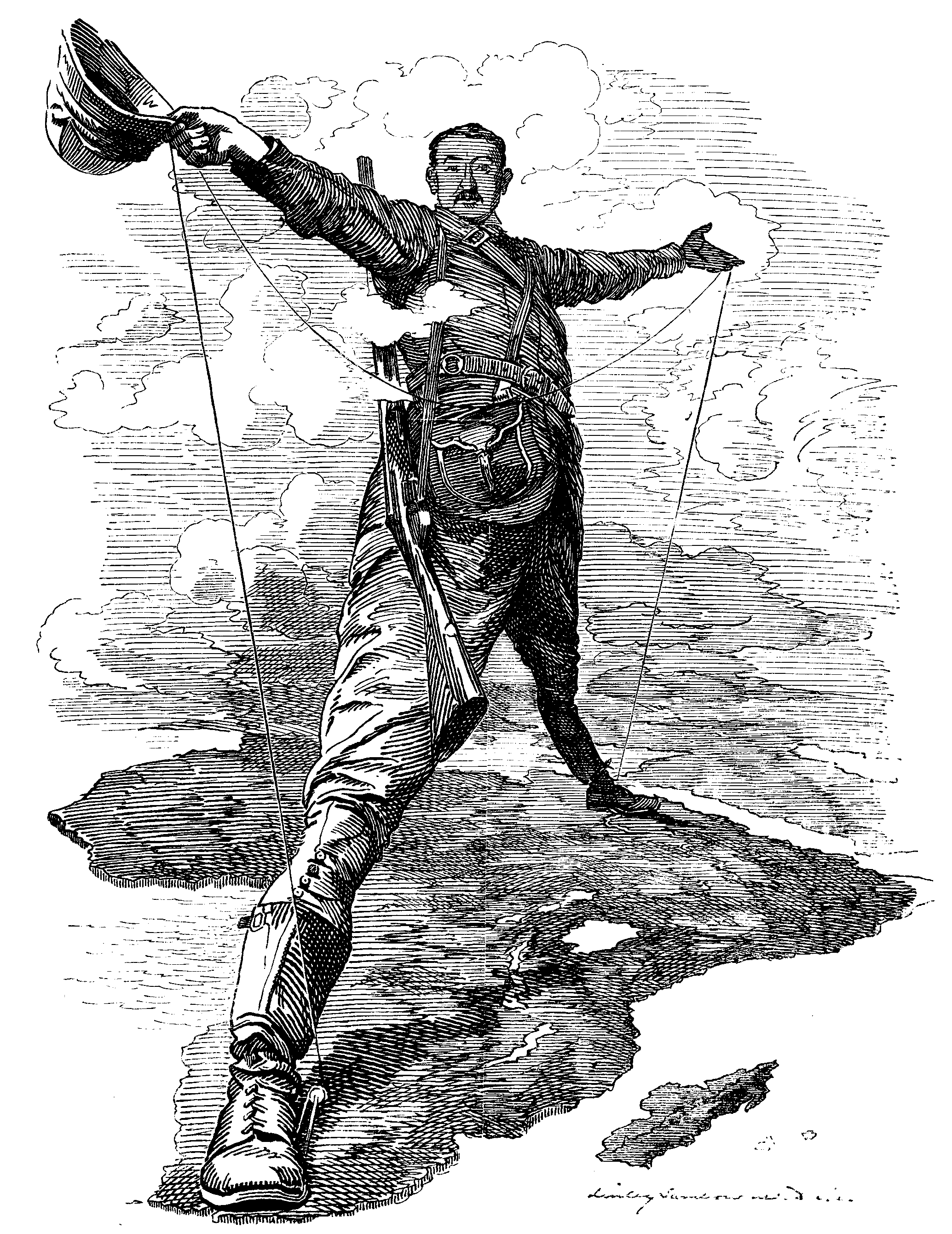
- Cecil Rhodes striding from Cairo to Cape Town
- Artists: Edward Linley Sambourne, Punch
- Year: 1892
- Subject: Cecil Rhodes

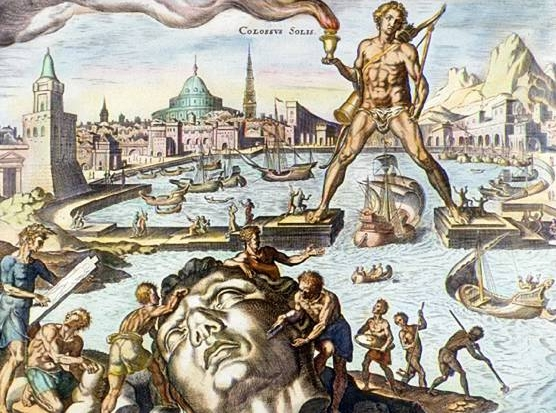
The Colossus of Rhodes, engraved by Maerten van Heemskerck for the 1572 Octo Mundi Miracula, the earliest known representation of the Colossus in modern times.

The Rhodes Colossus is an editorial cartoon illustrated by the English cartoonist Edward Linley Sambourne and published by Punch magazine in 1892. It depicts the English business magnate Cecil Rhodes as a giant straddling over Africa and holding a telegraph line grounded at the northern and southern ends of the continent, a reference to his desire to build a "Cape to Cairo" rail and telegraph line connecting most of the British colonies in Africa. It is a visual pun on the Colossus of Rhodes, one of the Seven Wonders of the Ancient World.

== History ==
The Rhodes as Colossus pun used in this artwork was a well-known joke that originated in South Africa. The first newspaper to print the pun was The Lantern, a comic weekly in Cape Town, in the aftermath of Rhodes' short tenure as Treasurer-General of Cape Colony in 1884. By the time The Rhodes Colossus was published, the pun had circulated widely in Britain's colonies and the metropole. The joke was well-received by the staff of Punch, which frequently trafficked in classical allusion and had already used it before the conception of the cartoon. Besides historic depictions of the Colossus of Rhodes, such as that by van Heemskerck (see below), The Rhodes Colossus bears a visual resemblance to The Colossus of Rail Roads, an 1879 Joseph Keppler cartoon in Puck depicting William Vanderbilt.

The subject was "most likely suggested by" Punch editor Edwin James Milliken, who also wrote the comic poem of the same name which accompanied the cartoon. Cartoonist Edward Linley Sambourne sketched the composition on December 1, 1892, and then made photographs of himself posing in the manner of the cartoon, wearing colonial khaki and with a gun slung around his shoulder (in the place of the bow around van Heemskerck's Colossus). Sambourne bought a pith helmet for the photoshoot, and finished the cartoon on December 2.

The cartoon appeared on the December 5, 1892 Monday edition of Punch (although it was dated for the December 10 issue), accompanied by a recent excerpt from The Times about a Rhodes plan to extend an electrical telegraph line from Cape Town to Cairo. The excerpt from The Times reads:

Mr. Rhodes announced that it was his intention, either with the help of his friends or by himself, to continue the telegraph northwards, across the Zambesi, through Nyassaland, and along Lake Tanganyika to Uganda. Nor is this all.... This colossal Monte Cristo means to cross the Soudan ... and to complete the overland telegraph line from Cape Town to Cairo; that is, from England to the whole of her possessions or colonies, or 'spheres of influence' in Africa.

The cartoon and excerpt were followed by a piece of satirical verse by Edwin James Milliken on the character and ambitions of Rhodes. Satirical verses and stories often accompanied cartoons in Punch magazine. In the verse, Rhodes is described as a "Director and Statesman in one" and a "Seven-League-Booted Colossus" that stands "O'er Africa striding from dark end to end, to forward black emancipation." He is also described as a "shrewd trader" and a "diplomat full of finesse and sharp schemes with a touch of the pious Crusader".

The cartoon was an immediate hit, and was widely reprinted in the years following. It also inspired a number of similar cartoons.

== Iconography ==
Sambourne illustrated this visual pun to depict Cecil Rhodes as the ancient Greek statue the Colossus of Rhodes, one of the Seven Wonders of the Ancient World, following the traditional (and architecturally unlikely) depiction of the Colossus with wide-set legs across Rhodes harbour (above).

Rhodes measures with the telegraphic line the distance from Cape Town (at his right foot) in South Africa to Cairo (at his left foot) in Egypt, illustrating his broader "Cape to Cairo" concept for further colonial expansion in Africa. In his right hand Rhodes holds a pith helmet with a rifle slung around his right shoulder.

Rhodes stands in a powerful, open armed stance. This has been seen by scholars an indication of his power and influence during the European colonisation of Africa. His giant size indicates his larger than life aspirations and desire for further influence in the continent.

== Influence ==
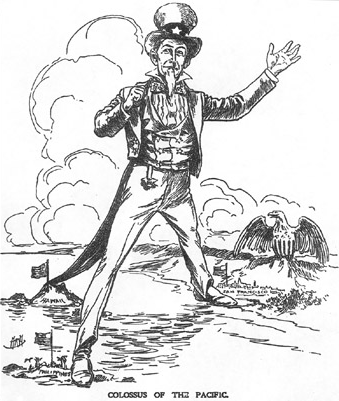
An American cartoon published in 1898, titled Colossus of the Pacific; depicting US imperialism in the Pacific Ocean after the American victory in the Spanish–American War, and making a deliberate reference to Sambourne's cartoon

The cartoon quickly became widely referenced in historical texts as an illustrated representation of the Scramble for Africa, and the New Imperialism era as a whole. The original context of a proposed telegraph line is rarely mentioned in such reproductions, which take the "Cape to Cairo" concept more generally.

In Adam Hochschild's book King Leopold's Ghost: A Story of Greed, Terror, and Heroism, in Colonial Africa, Rhodes is introduced as the "future South African politician and diamond magnate" who claimed he "would annex the planets" if he could. The South African cartoonist Jonathan Shapiro parodied the cartoon in a 2009 work by placing Chinese premier Wen Jiabao in place of Rhodes holding up Nkosazana Dlamini-Zuma, the-then Minister of International Relations and Cooperation (as a marionette) while the Dalai Lama looks on from Asia. The cartoon satirized Sino-African relations in general, and recent China–South Africa relations in particular, after the Dalai Lama was denied a visa to attend an international peace conference in Johannesburg, a move that was perceived to be the result of Chinese diplomatic pressure.

In 2013 the political cartoonist Martin Rowson referenced Sambourne's cartoon in a satirical illustration published on 1 February in The Guardian on British Prime Minister David Cameron's policies regarding Algeria and the French intervention in Mali.

== Legacy ==
The cartoon has become one of the most frequently used images to represent the era of New Imperialism and the European colonisation of Africa. Rhodes' legacy in modern-day South Africa has been described by the South African academic Patrick Bond as "one of the world's most lucrative, and destructive", referencing the numerous fraudulent and misleading treaties he signed with various African peoples which ceded portions of their territory to him.

== See also ==
- Rhodes Must Fall
