= British Empire =

- Left: Flag of Great Britain (1707–1801); Right: Flag of the United Kingdom (1801–present)

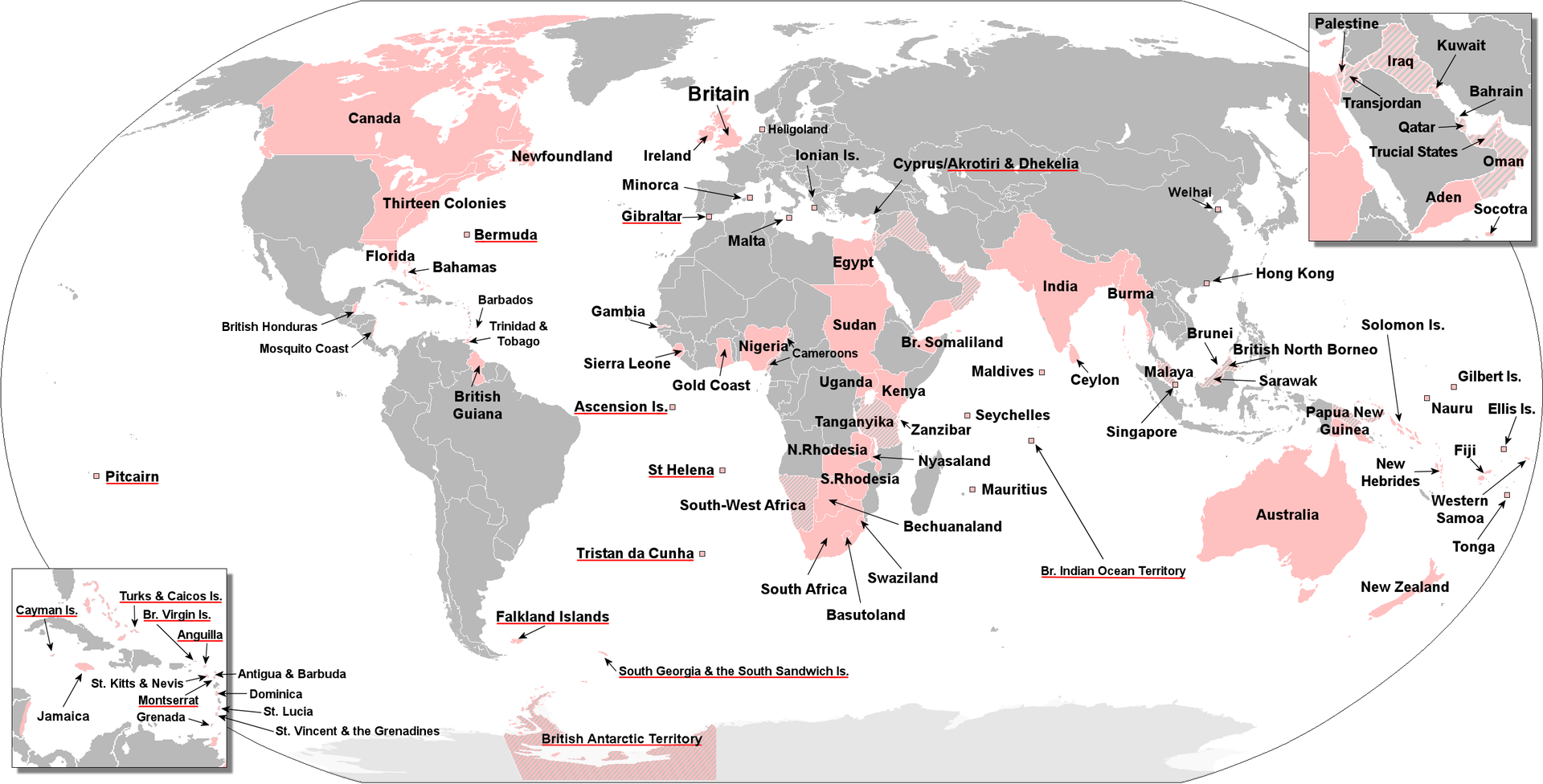
- Areas of the world that were part of the British Empire at various points in history, with current British Overseas Territories underlined in red. Mandates and protected states are shown in a lighter shade.
- Capital and largest city: London; 51°30′N 0°07′W
- Government: Constitutional monarchy

Area
- 1920: 35,500,000 km^{2} (13,700,000 sq mi)

Population
  - 1913: 412,000,000

The British Empire comprised the dominions, colonies, protectorates, mandates, and other territories ruled or administered by the United Kingdom and its predecessor states. It began with the overseas possessions and trading posts established by England in the late 16th and early 17th centuries, and colonisation attempts by Scotland during the 17th century. At its height in the 19th and early 20th century, it was the largest empire in history and, for a century, was the foremost global power. By 1913 the British Empire held sway over 412 million people, 23 per cent of the world population at the time, and by 1920 it covered 35.5 million km^{2} (13.7 million sq mi), 24 per cent of the Earth's total land area. The British Parliament was the supreme law-making authority for all the British possessions which made up the empire. As a result, its constitutional, legal, linguistic, and cultural legacy is widespread. It was described as "the empire on which the sun never sets", as the sun was always shining on at least one of its territories.

During the Age of Discovery in the 15th and 16th centuries, Portugal and Spain pioneered European exploration of the world, and in the process established large overseas empires. Motivated by the great wealth these empires generated, England, France, and the Netherlands began to establish colonies and trade networks in the Americas and Asia. A series of wars in the 17th and 18th centuries with the Netherlands and France left Britain the dominant colonial power in North America. Britain became a major power in the Indian subcontinent after the East India Company's conquest of Mughal Bengal at the Battle of Plassey in 1757.

The American Revolution resulted in Britain losing some of its oldest and most populous colonies in North America by 1783. While retaining control of British North America (now Canada) and territories in and near the Caribbean in the British West Indies, British colonial expansion turned towards Asia, Africa, and the Pacific. After the defeat of France in the Napoleonic Wars (1803–1815), Britain emerged as the principal naval and imperial power of the 19th century and expanded its imperial holdings. It pursued trade concessions in China and Japan, and territory in Southeast Asia. The Great Game and Scramble for Africa also ensued. It also colonised India by defeating the last major imperial dynasty Maratha Empire by 1818 in the Third Anglo-Maratha War. The period of relative peace (1815–1914) during which the British Empire became the global hegemon was later described as Pax Britannica (Latin for "British Peace").

Alongside the formal control that Britain exerted over its colonies, its dominance of much of world trade, and of its oceans, meant that it effectively controlled the economies of, and readily enforced its interests in, many regions, such as Asia and Latin America. It also came to dominate the Middle East, shaping its modern borders alongside France. Increasing degrees of autonomy were recognised for its white settler colonies, some of which were formally reclassified as dominions by the 1920s. By the start of the 20th century, Germany and the United States had begun to challenge Britain's economic lead. Military, economic and colonial tensions between Britain and Germany were major causes of the First World War, during which Britain relied heavily on its empire. The conflict placed enormous strain on its military, financial, and manpower resources. Although the empire achieved its largest territorial extent immediately after the First World War, Britain was no longer the world's preeminent industrial or military power.

In the Second World War, Britain's colonies in East Asia and Southeast Asia were occupied by the Empire of Japan. Despite the final victory of Britain and its allies, the damage to British prestige and the British economy helped accelerate the decline of the empire. India, Britain's most valuable and populous possession, achieved independence in 1947 as part of a larger decolonisation movement, in which Britain granted independence to most territories of the empire. The Suez Crisis of 1956 confirmed Britain's decline as a global power, and the handover of Hong Kong to China on 1 July 1997 symbolised for many the end of the British Empire, though fourteen overseas territories that are remnants of the empire remain under British sovereignty. After independence many former British colonies, along with most of the dominions, joined the Commonwealth of Nations, a free association of independent states. Fifteen of these, including the United Kingdom, retain the same person as monarch, currently King Charles III.

== Origins (1497–1583) ==
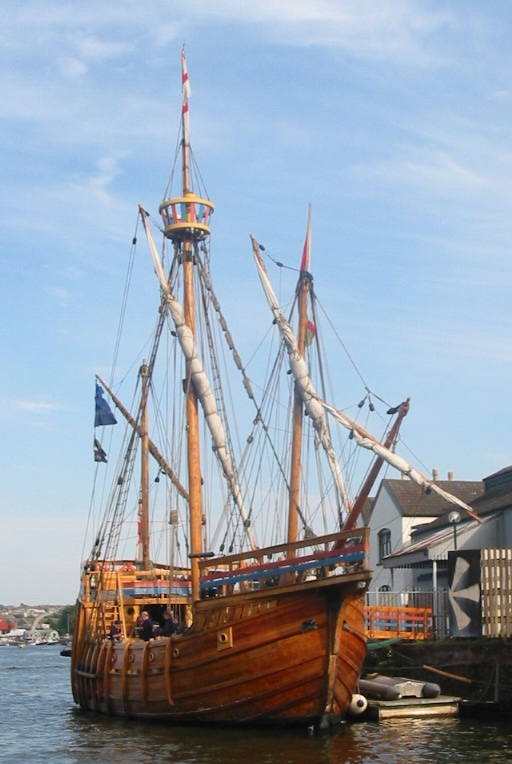
A replica of the Matthew, John Cabot's ship used for his second voyage to the New World in 1497

The foundations of the overseas British Empire were laid when England and Scotland were separate kingdoms, and, at the time, ruled by different monarchs. In 1496 King Henry VII of England, following the successes of Spain and Portugal in overseas exploration, commissioned John Cabot to lead an expedition to discover a Northwest Passage to Asia via the North Atlantic. Cabot sailed in 1497, five years after the first voyage of Christopher Columbus, and made landfall on the coast of Newfoundland. He believed he had reached Asia, and there was no attempt to found a colony. Cabot led another voyage to the Americas the following year but did not return; it is unknown what happened to his ships. There is "inferential evidence [that] suggests that Bristol mariners may already have known of that North American shore and had been harvesting its rich seas for a decade or more", but England made no formal claims.

No further attempts to establish English colonies in the Americas were made until well into the reign of Queen Elizabeth I, during the last decades of the 16th century. In the meantime, Henry VIII's 1533 Statute in Restraint of Appeals had declared "that this realm of England is an Empire". The Protestant Reformation turned England and Catholic Spain into implacable enemies. In 1562, Elizabeth I encouraged the privateers John Hawkins and Francis Drake to engage in slave-raiding attacks against Spanish and Portuguese ships off the coast of West Africa with the aim of establishing an Atlantic slave trade. This effort was rebuffed and later, as the Anglo-Spanish Wars intensified, Elizabeth I gave her blessing to further privateering raids against Spanish ports in the Americas and shipping that was returning across the Atlantic, laden with treasure from the New World. At the same time, influential writers such as Richard Hakluyt and John Dee (who was the first to use the term "British Empire") were beginning to press for the establishment of England's own empire. By this time, Spain had become the dominant power in the Americas and was exploring the Pacific Ocean, Portugal had established trading posts and forts from the coasts of Africa and Brazil to China, and France had begun to settle the Saint Lawrence River area, later to become New France.

Although England tended to trail behind Portugal, Spain, and France in establishing overseas colonies, it carried out its first modern colonisation, in sixteenth-century Ireland, with settlements, known as "plantations", of English and Welsh Protestants. England had already colonised part of the country following the Norman invasion of Ireland in 1169, but English authority had waned over the centuries. During the reign of Elizabeth I, a pattern of conquest and attempts at colonisation was "contemporaneous with and parallel to the first effective of Englishmen in North America". Several men who helped establish the Munster plantations in Ireland later played a part in the early colonisation of North America, particularly a group known as the West Country Men.

== English overseas possessions (1583–1707) ==
In 1578 Elizabeth I granted a patent to Humphrey Gilbert for discovery and overseas exploration. That year Gilbert sailed for the Caribbean with the intention of engaging in piracy and establishing a colony in North America, but the expedition was aborted before it had crossed the Atlantic. In 1583 he embarked on a second attempt. On this occasion, he formally claimed the harbour of the island of Newfoundland, although no settlers were left behind. Gilbert did not survive the return journey to England and was succeeded by his half-brother, Walter Raleigh, who was granted his own patent by Elizabeth in 1584. Later that year, Raleigh founded the Roanoke Colony on the coast of present-day North Carolina, but lack of supplies caused the colony to fail.

From 1585 to 1603 England fully conquered Ireland and challenged the naval dominance of Spain in the Anglo-Spanish War, with their war ending in a draw.

In 1603 James VI of Scotland ascended (as James I) to the English throne and in 1604 negotiated the Treaty of London, ending hostilities with Spain. Now at peace with its main rival, English attention shifted from preying on other nations' colonial infrastructures to the business of establishing its own overseas colonies. The British Empire began to take shape during the early 17th century, with the English settlement of North America and the smaller islands of the Caribbean, and the establishment of joint-stock companies, most notably the East India Company, to administer colonies and overseas trade. This period, until the loss of the Thirteen Colonies after the American War of Independence towards the end of the 18th century, has been referred to by some historians as the "First British Empire".

=== Americas, Africa and the slave trade ===
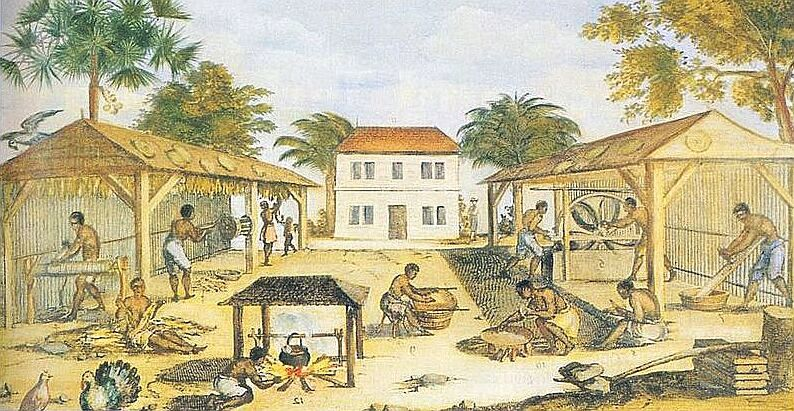
A 1670 illustration of African slaves working in 17th-century colonial Virginia in British America

England's early efforts at colonisation in the Americas met with mixed success. An attempt to establish a colony in Guiana in 1604 lasted only two years and failed in its main objective to find gold deposits. Colonies on the Caribbean islands of St Lucia (1605) and Grenada (1609) rapidly folded. The first permanent English settlement in the Americas was founded in 1607 in Jamestown by Captain John Smith, and managed by the Virginia Company; the Crown took direct control of the venture in 1624, thereby founding the Colony of Virginia. Bermuda was settled and claimed by England as a result of the 1609 shipwreck of the Virginia Company's flagship, while attempts to settle Newfoundland were largely unsuccessful. In 1620, Plymouth was founded as a haven by Puritan religious separatists, later known as the Pilgrims. Fleeing religious persecution became a major motive for many English would-be colonists to risk the arduous trans-Atlantic voyage: Maryland was established by English Roman Catholics (1634), Rhode Island (1636) as a colony tolerant of all religions and Connecticut (1639) for Congregationalists. England's North American holdings were further expanded by the annexation of the Dutch colony of New Netherland in 1664, following the capture of New Amsterdam, which was renamed New York. Although less financially successful than colonies in the Caribbean, these territories had large areas of good agricultural land and attracted far greater numbers of English emigrants, who preferred their temperate climates.

The British West Indies initially provided England's most important and lucrative colonies. Settlements were successfully established in St. Kitts (1624), Barbados (1627) and Nevis (1628), but struggled until the "Sugar Revolution" transformed the Caribbean economy in the mid-17th century. Large sugarcane plantations were first established in the 1640s on Barbados, with assistance from Dutch merchants and Sephardic Jews fleeing Portuguese Brazil. At first, sugar was grown primarily using white indentured labour, but rising costs soon led English traders to embrace the use of imported African slaves. The enormous wealth generated by slave-produced sugar made Barbados the most successful colony in the Americas, and one of the most densely populated places in the world. This boom led to the spread of sugar cultivation across the Caribbean, supported the development of non-plantation colonies in North America, and accelerated the growth of the Atlantic slave trade, particularly the triangular trade of slaves, sugar and provisions between Africa, the West Indies and Europe.

To ensure that the increasingly healthy profits of colonial trade remained in English hands, Parliament decreed in 1651 that only English ships would be able to ply their trade in English colonies. This led to hostilities with the United Dutch Provinces—a series of Anglo-Dutch Wars—which would eventually strengthen England's position in the Americas at the expense of the Dutch. In 1655, England annexed the island of Jamaica from the Spanish, and in 1666 succeeded in colonising the Bahamas. In 1670, Charles II incorporated by royal charter the Hudson's Bay Company (HBC), granting it a monopoly on the fur trade in the area known as Rupert's Land, which would later form a large proportion of the Dominion of Canada. Forts and trading posts established by the HBC were frequently the subject of attacks by the French, who had established their own fur trading colony in adjacent New France.

Two years later, the Royal African Company was granted a monopoly on the supply of slaves to the British colonies in the Caribbean. The company would transport more slaves across the Atlantic than any other, and significantly grew England's share of the trade, from 33 per cent in 1673 to 74 per cent in 1683. The removal of this monopoly between 1688 and 1712 allowed independent British slave traders to thrive, leading to a rapid escalation in the number of slaves transported. In the Atlantic slave trade, British ships carried a third of all slaves shipped across the Atlantic—approximately 3.5 million Africans—until the abolition of the trade by Parliament in 1807 (see § Abolition of slavery). To facilitate the shipment of slaves, forts were established on the coast of West Africa, such as James Island, Accra and Bunce Island. In the British Caribbean, the percentage of the population of African descent rose from 25 per cent in 1650 to around 80 per cent in 1780, and in the Thirteen Colonies from 10 per cent to 40 per cent over the same period (the majority in the southern colonies). The transatlantic slave trade played a pervasive role in British economic life, and became a major economic mainstay for western port cities. Ships registered in Bristol, Liverpool and London were responsible for the bulk of British slave trading. For the transported, harsh and unhygienic conditions on the slaving ships and poor diets meant that the average mortality rate during the Middle Passage was one in seven.

After the abolition of slavery in the British Empire, plantation owners in the Caribbean used indentured labour from India as a replacement workforce. From the mid-19th century, more than 500,000 Indians were brought in to British Guiana, Trinidad and other colonies.

=== Rivalry with other European empires ===
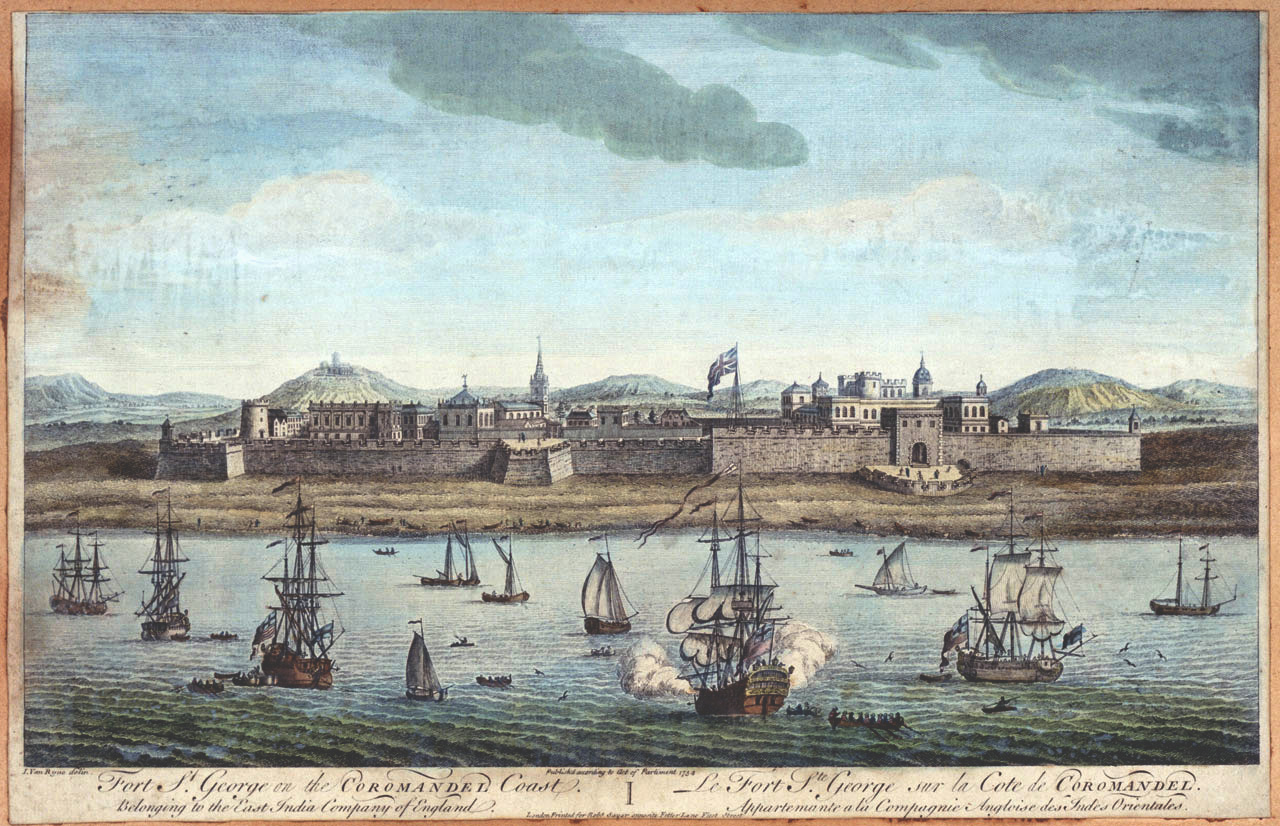
Fort St. George in Madras, India, was founded in 1639.

At the end of the 16th century, England and the Dutch Empire began to challenge the Portuguese Empire's monopoly of trade with Asia, forming private joint-stock companies to finance the voyages—the English, later British, East India Company and the Dutch East India Company, chartered in 1600 and 1602 respectively. The primary aim of these companies was to tap into the lucrative spice trade, an effort focused mainly on two regions: the East Indies archipelago, and an important hub in the trade network, India. There, they competed for trade supremacy with Portugal and with each other. Although England eclipsed the Netherlands as a colonial power, in the short term the Netherlands' more advanced financial system and the three Anglo-Dutch Wars of the 17th century left it with a stronger position in Asia. Hostilities ceased after the Glorious Revolution of 1688 when the Dutch William of Orange ascended the English throne, bringing peace between the Dutch Republic and England. A deal between the two nations left the spice trade of the East Indies archipelago to the Netherlands and the textiles industry of India to England, but textiles soon overtook spices in terms of profitability.

Peace between England and the Netherlands in 1688 meant that the two countries entered the Nine Years' War as allies, but the conflict—waged in Europe and overseas between France, Spain and the Anglo-Dutch alliance—left the English a stronger colonial power than the Dutch, who were forced to devote a larger proportion of their military budget to the costly land war in Europe. The death of Charles II of Spain in 1700 and his bequeathal of Spain and its colonial empire to Philip V of Spain, a grandson of the King of France, raised the prospect of the unification of France, Spain and their respective colonies, an unacceptable state of affairs for England and the other powers of Europe. In 1701, England, Portugal and the Netherlands sided with the Holy Roman Empire against Spain and France in the War of the Spanish Succession, which lasted for thirteen years.

== Colonies and territories of Scotland (1629–1707) ==
Colonisation attempts by the Kingdom of Scotland predates the establishment of the United Kingdom of Great Britain and the British Empire. During the 17th century, the Kingdom of Scotland made attempts to establish trading schemes in Ireland and Canada. Nova Scotia, today a province of Canada, was a short lived scheme in the Mi'kmaq people territory. Additionally, there was a high number of Scots in Ireland, particularly in the region of Ulster, who settled there as planters.

=== North America ===
The first documented Scottish settlement in the Americas was of Nova Scotia in 1629. On 29 September 1621, the charter for the foundation of a colony was granted by James VI of Scotland to Sir William Alexander. Between 1622 and 1628, Sir William launched four attempts to send colonists to Nova Scotia; all failed for various reasons. A successful settlement of Nova Scotia was finally achieved in 1629. The colony's charter, in law, made Nova Scotia (defined as all land between Newfoundland and New England; i.e., The Maritimes) a part of mainland Scotland; this was later used to get around the English navigation acts.

As a country, Scotland engaged in two ventures in an attempt to establish colonies within English colonies during the 1680s in Carolina and East New Jersey. The attempt to establish themselves in Carolina was largely in part due to Scottish Presbyterians fleeing from the threat of religious persecution in Scotland, and were assisted in their efforts by Scottish merchants who were aiming to develop transatlantic trade which was not subjected to the English Navigation Acts. The Act restricted Scottish trade with English colonies. Scottish settlement attempts in Carolina began in 1682, and was eventually defeated by the dissolution of the Scottish settlement of Stewartstoun, which was established in 1684, by the Spanish in 1686.

=== South America ===
In 1695 the Parliament of Scotland granted a charter to the Company of Scotland, which established a settlement in 1698 on the Isthmus of Panama. Besieged by neighbouring Spanish colonists of New Granada, and affected by malaria, the colony was abandoned two years later. The Darien scheme was a financial disaster for Scotland: a quarter of Scottish capital was lost in the enterprise. The episode had major political consequences, helping to persuade the government of the Kingdom of Scotland of the merits of turning the personal union with England into a political and economic one under the Kingdom of Great Britain established by the Acts of Union 1707.

== Expansion and colonial conflict (1707–1783) ==
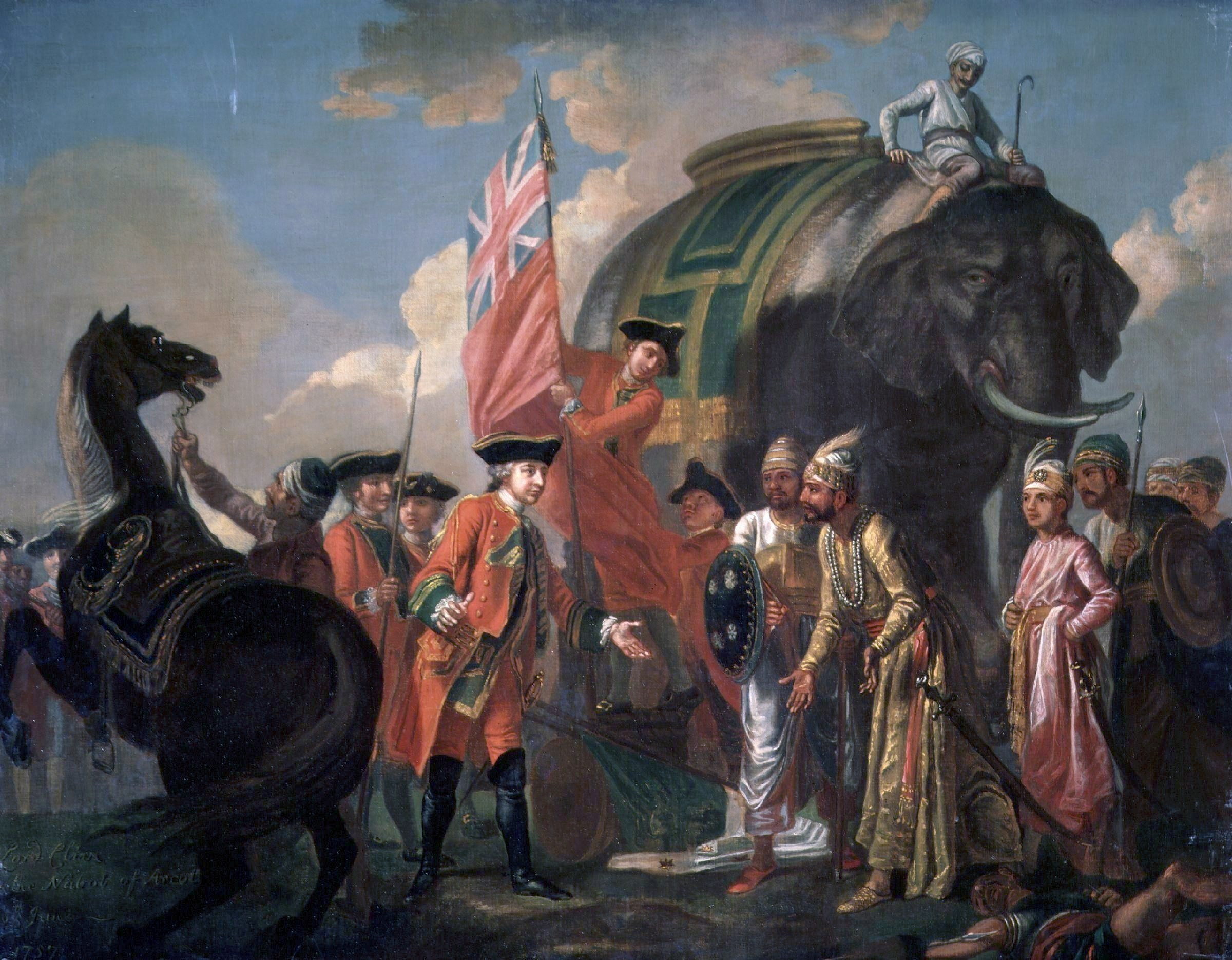
Robert Clive's victory at the Battle of Plassey established the East India Company as both a military and commercial power.

The 18th century saw the newly united Great Britain rise to be the world's dominant colonial power, with France becoming its main rival on the imperial stage. Great Britain, Portugal, the Netherlands, and the Holy Roman Empire continued the War of the Spanish Succession, which lasted until 1714 and was concluded by the Treaty of Utrecht. Philip V of Spain renounced his and his descendants' claim to the French throne, and Spain lost its empire in Europe. The British Empire was territorially enlarged: from France, Britain gained Newfoundland and Acadia, and from Spain, Gibraltar and Menorca. Gibraltar became a critical naval base and allowed Britain to control the Atlantic entry and exit point to the Mediterranean. Spain ceded the rights to the lucrative asiento (permission to sell African slaves in Spanish America) to Britain. With the outbreak of the Anglo-Spanish War of Jenkins' Ear in 1739, Spanish privateers attacked British merchant shipping along the Triangle Trade routes. In 1746, the Spanish and British began peace talks, with the King of Spain agreeing to stop all attacks on British shipping; however, in the 1750 Treaty of Madrid, Britain lost its slave-trading rights in Latin America.

In the East Indies, British and Dutch merchants continued to compete in spices and textiles. With textiles becoming the larger trade, by 1720, in terms of sales, the British company had overtaken the Dutch. During the middle decades of the 18th century, there were several outbreaks of military conflict on the Indian subcontinent, as the English East India Company and its French counterpart, struggled alongside local rulers to fill the vacuum that had been left by the decline of the Mughal Empire. The Battle of Plassey in 1757, in which the British defeated the Nawab of Bengal and his French allies, left the British East India Company in control of Bengal and as a major military and political power in India. France was left control of its five enclaves but with military restrictions in Bengal, ending French hopes of controlling India. In the following decades the British East India Company gradually increased the size of the territories under its control, either ruling directly or via local rulers under the threat of force from the Presidency Armies, the vast majority of which was composed of Indian sepoys, led by British officers. The British and French struggles in India became but one theatre of the global Seven Years' War (1756–1763) involving France, Britain, and the other major European powers.

The signing of the Treaty of Paris of 1763 had important consequences for the future of the British Empire. In North America, France's future as a colonial power effectively ended with the recognition of British claims to Rupert's Land, and the ceding of New France to Britain (leaving a sizeable French-speaking population under British control) and Louisiana to Spain. Spain ceded the Floridas to Britain. Along with its victory over France in India, the Seven Years' War therefore left Britain as the world's most powerful maritime power.

=== Loss of the Thirteen American Colonies ===
During the 1760s and early 1770s relations between the Thirteen Colonies and Britain became increasingly strained, primarily because of resentment of the British Parliament's attempts to govern and tax American colonists without their consent. This was summarised at the time by the colonists' slogan "No taxation without representation", a perceived violation of the guaranteed Rights of Englishmen. The American Revolution began with a rejection of Parliamentary authority and moves towards self-government. In response, Britain sent troops to reimpose direct rule, leading to the outbreak of war in 1775. The following year, in 1776, the Second Continental Congress issued the Declaration of Independence proclaiming the colonies' sovereignty from the British Empire as the new United States of America. The entry of French and Spanish forces into the war tipped the military balance in the Americans' favour and after a decisive defeat at Yorktown in 1781, Britain began negotiating peace terms. American independence was acknowledged at the Peace of Paris in 1783.

The loss of such a large portion of British America, at the time Britain's most populous overseas possession, is seen by some historians as the event defining the transition between the first and second empires, in which Britain shifted its attention away from the Americas and towards Asia, the Pacific, and later Africa. Adam Smith's Wealth of Nations, published in 1776, had argued that colonies were redundant, and that free trade should replace the old mercantilist policies that had characterised the first period of colonial expansion, dating back to the protectionism of Spain and Portugal. The growth of trade between the newly independent United States and Britain after 1783 seemed to confirm Smith's view that political control was not necessary for economic success.

The war to the south influenced British policy in Canada, where between 40,000 and 100,000 defeated Loyalists had migrated from the new United States following independence. The 14,000 Loyalists who went to the Saint John and Saint Croix river valleys, then part of Nova Scotia, felt too far removed from the provincial government in Halifax, so London split off New Brunswick as a separate colony in 1784. The Constitutional Act 1791 created the provinces of Upper Canada (mainly English speaking) and Lower Canada (mainly French-speaking) to defuse tensions between the French and British communities, and implemented governmental systems similar to those employed in Britain, with the intention of asserting imperial authority and not allowing the sort of popular control of government that was perceived to have led to the American Revolution.

Tensions between Britain and the United States escalated again during the Napoleonic Wars, as Britain tried to cut off American trade with France and boarded American ships to impress men into the Royal Navy. The United States Congress declared war, the War of 1812, and invaded Canadian territory. In response, Britain invaded the US, but the pre-war boundaries were reaffirmed by the 1814 Treaty of Ghent, ensuring Canada's future would be separate from that of the United States.

== Consolidation and global dominance (1783–1815) ==
=== Exploration of the Pacific ===
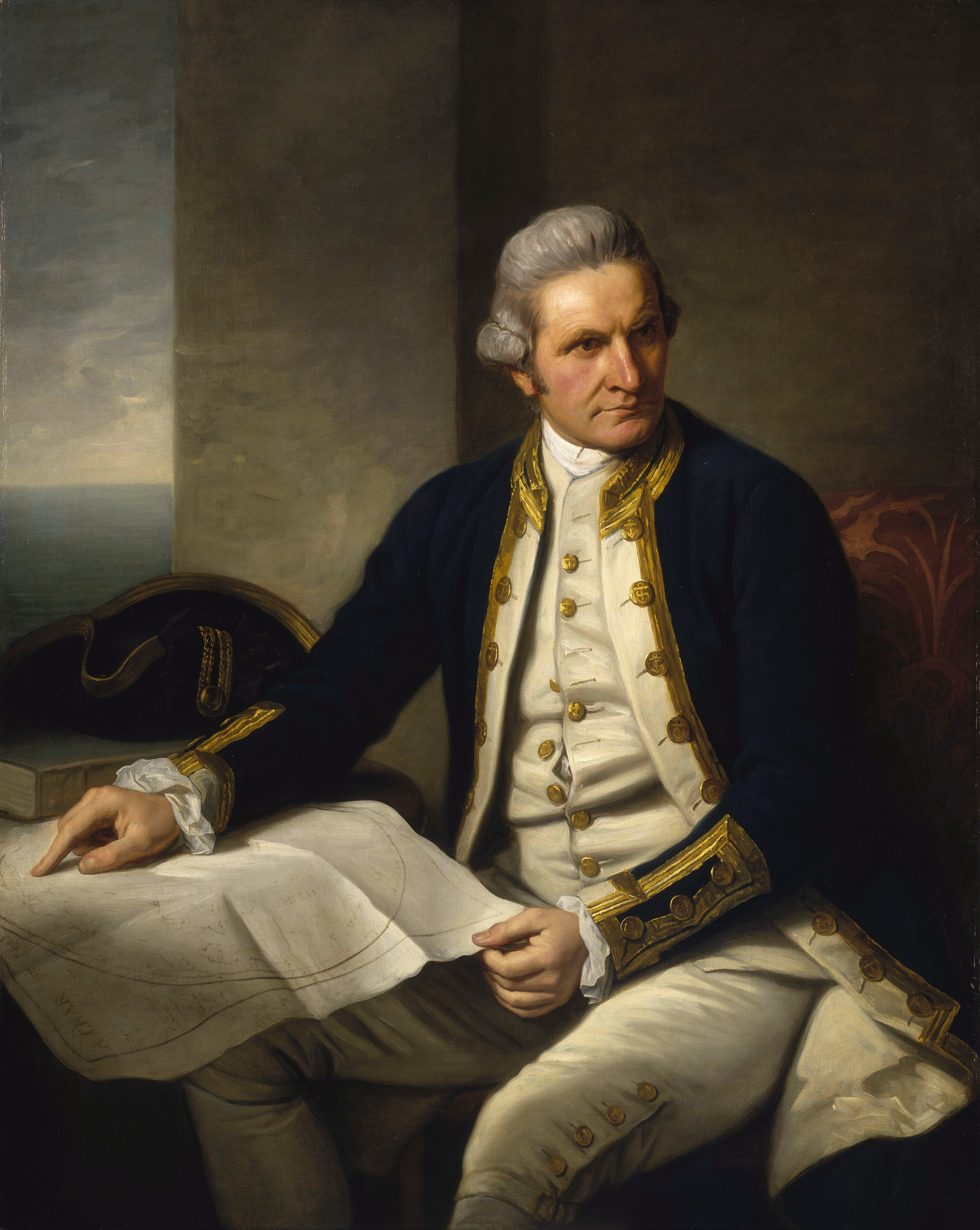
Portrait of James Cook by Nathaniel Dance-Holland, 1775. James Cook's mission was to find the alleged southern continent Terra Australis.

Since 1718 transportation and exile to the American colonies had been a penalty for various offences in Britain, with about one thousand convicts transported per year. Forced to find an alternative location after the loss of the Thirteen Colonies in 1783, the British government looked for an alternative, eventually turning to Australia. On his first of three voyages commissioned by the government, James Cook reached New Zealand in October 1769. He was the first European to circumnavigate and map the country. From the late 18th century, the country was regularly visited by explorers and other sailors, missionaries, traders and adventurers but no attempt was made to settle the country or establish possession. The coast of Australia had been discovered for Europeans by the Dutch in 1606, but there was no attempt to colonise it. In 1770, after leaving New Zealand, Cook charted the eastern coast, claimed the continent for Britain, and named it New South Wales. In 1778, Joseph Banks, Cook's botanist on the voyage, presented evidence to the government on the suitability of Botany Bay for the establishment of a penal settlement, and in 1787 the first shipment of convicts set sail, arriving in 1788. Unusually, Australia was claimed through proclamation. Indigenous Australians were considered too uncivilised to require treaties, and colonisation brought disease and violence that together with the deliberate dispossession of land and culture were devastating to these peoples. Britain continued to transport convicts to New South Wales until 1840, to Tasmania until 1853 and to Western Australia until 1868. The Australian colonies became profitable exporters of wool and gold, mainly because of the Victorian gold rush, making its capital Melbourne for a time the richest city in the world.

The British also expanded their mercantile interests in the North Pacific. Spain and Britain had become rivals in the area, culminating in the Nootka Crisis in 1789. Both sides mobilised for war, but when France refused to support Spain, it was forced to back down, leading to the Nootka Convention. The outcome was a humiliation for Spain, which practically renounced all sovereignty on the North Pacific coast. This opened the way to British expansion in the area, and a number of expeditions took place; firstly a naval expedition led by George Vancouver which explored the inlets around the Pacific North West, particularly around Vancouver Island. On land, expeditions sought to discover a river route to the Pacific for the extension of the North American fur trade. Alexander Mackenzie of the North West Company led the first, starting out in 1792, and a year later he became the first European to reach the Pacific overland north of the Rio Grande, reaching the ocean near present-day Bella Coola. This preceded the Lewis and Clark Expedition by twelve years. Shortly thereafter, Mackenzie's companion, John Finlay, founded the first permanent European settlement in British Columbia, Fort St. John. The North West Company sought further exploration and backed expeditions by David Thompson, starting in 1797, and later by Simon Fraser. These pushed into the wilderness territories of the Rocky Mountains and Interior Plateau to the Strait of Georgia on the Pacific Coast, expanding British North America westward.

=== Continued conquest in India ===
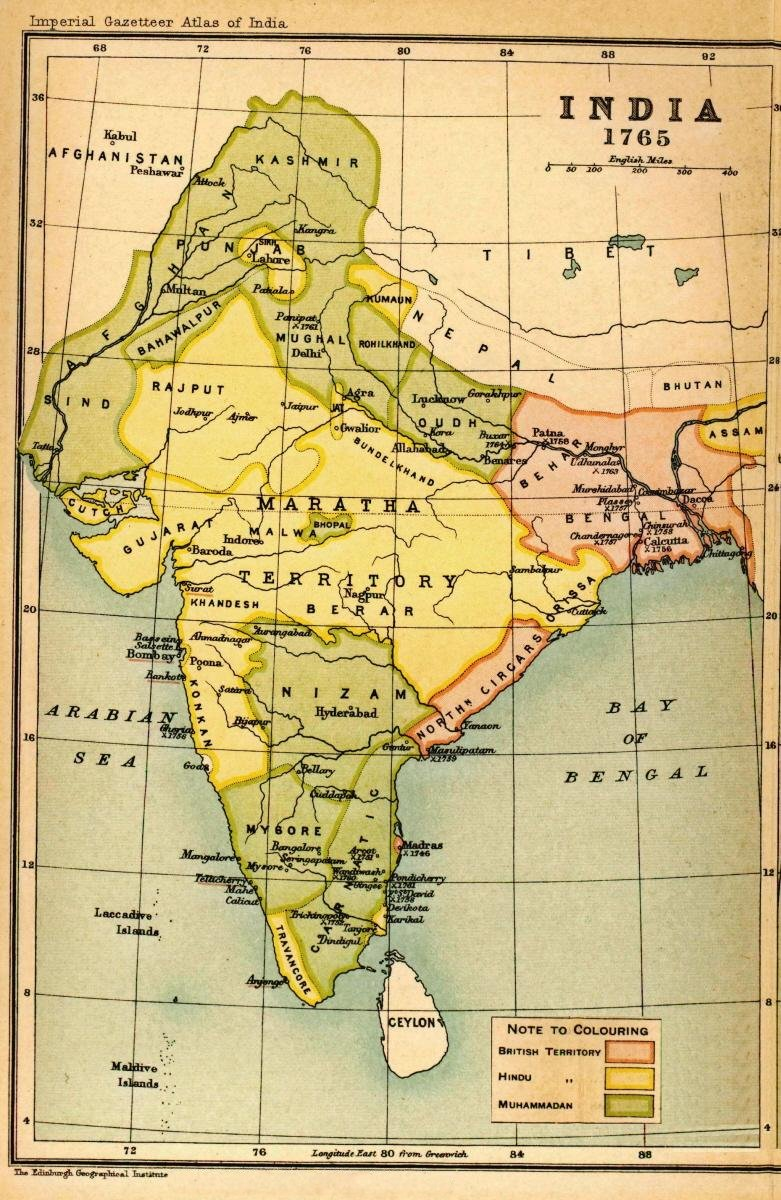
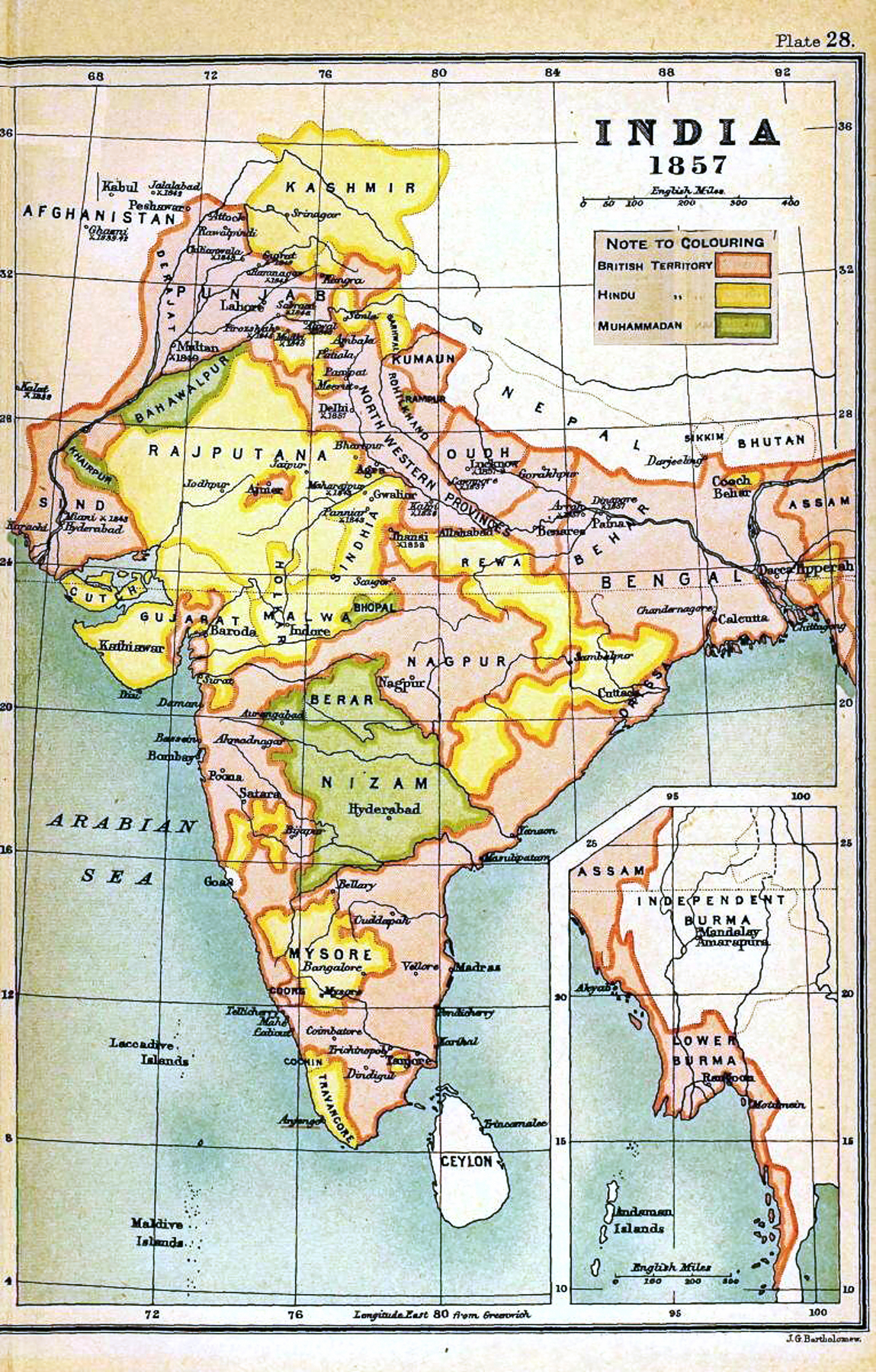
Maps of the Indian subcontinent in 1765 (left) and 1858 (right) showing British expansion in the region.

The East India Company fought a series of Anglo-Mysore Wars in Southern India with the Sultanate of Mysore under Hyder Ali and then Tipu Sultan. Defeats in the First Anglo-Mysore War and stalemate in the Second were followed by victories in the Third and the Fourth. Following Tipu Sultan's death in the fourth war in the Siege of Seringapatam (1799), the kingdom became a protectorate of the company.

The East India Company fought three Anglo-Maratha Wars with the Maratha Confederacy. The First Anglo-Maratha War ended in 1782 with a restoration of the pre-war status quo. The Second and Third Anglo-Maratha wars resulted in British victories. After the surrender of Peshwa Bajirao II in 1818, the East India Company acquired control of a large majority of the Indian subcontinent.

=== Wars with France ===
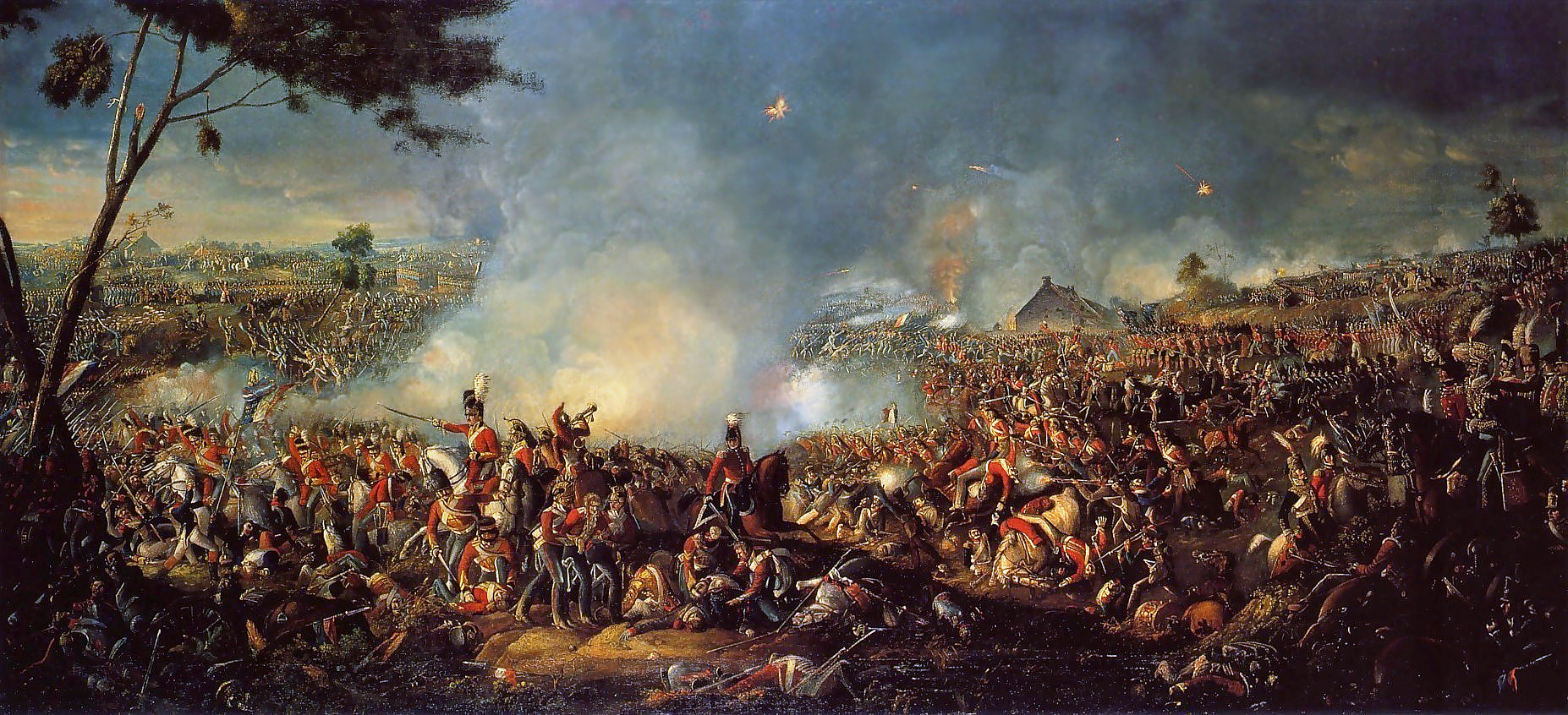
The Battle of Waterloo in 1815 ended in the defeat of Napoleon and marked the beginning of Pax Britannica.

Britain was challenged again by France under Napoleon, in a struggle that, unlike previous wars, represented a contest of ideologies between the two nations. It was not only Britain's position on the world stage that was at risk: Napoleon threatened to invade Britain itself, just as his armies had overrun many countries of continental Europe.

The Napoleonic Wars were therefore ones in which Britain invested large amounts of capital and resources to win. French ports were blockaded by the Royal Navy, which won a decisive victory over a French Imperial Navy-Spanish Navy fleet at the Battle of Trafalgar in 1805. Overseas colonies were attacked and occupied, including those of the Netherlands, which was annexed by Napoleon in 1810. France was finally defeated by a coalition of European armies in 1815. Britain was again the beneficiary of peace treaties: France ceded the Ionian Islands, Malta (which it had occupied in 1798), Mauritius, St Lucia, the Seychelles, and Tobago; Spain ceded Trinidad; the Netherlands ceded Guiana, Ceylon and the Cape Colony, while the Danish ceded Heligoland. Britain returned Guadeloupe, Martinique, French Guiana, and Réunion to France; Menorca to Spain; Danish West Indies to Denmark and Java and Suriname to the Netherlands.

=== Abolition of slavery ===
With the advent of the Industrial Revolution, goods produced by slavery became less important to the British economy. Added to this was the cost of suppressing regular slave rebellions. With support from the British abolitionist movement, Parliament enacted the Slave Trade Act in 1807, which abolished the slave trade in the empire. In 1808, Sierra Leone Colony was designated an official British colony for freed slaves. Parliamentary reform in 1832 saw the influence of the West India Committee decline. The Slavery Abolition Act, passed the following year, abolished slavery in the British Empire on 1 August 1834, finally bringing the empire into line with the law in the UK (with the exception of the territories administered by the East India Company and Ceylon, where slavery was ended in 1844). Under the Act, slaves were granted full emancipation after a period of four to six years of "apprenticeship". Facing further opposition from abolitionists, the apprenticeship system was abolished in 1838. The British government compensated slave-owners.

== Britain's imperial century (1815–1914) ==
During Britain's "imperial century" between 1815 and 1914, around 10 million sq mi (26 million km^{2}) of territory and roughly 400 million people were added to the British Empire. Victory over Napoleon left Britain without any serious international rival, other than Russia in Central Asia. Unchallenged at sea, Britain became the global policeman, a state of affairs later known as the Pax Britannica, and a foreign policy of "splendid isolation". Alongside the formal control it exerted over its own colonies, Britain's dominant position in world trade meant that it effectively controlled the economies of many countries, such as China, Argentina and Siam, which were seen as its "Informal Empire".

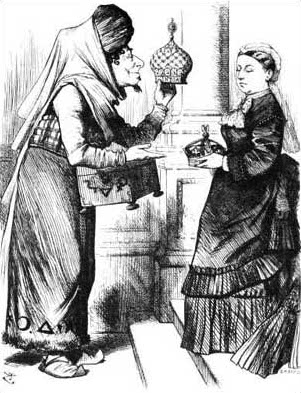
An 1876 political cartoon of Benjamin Disraeli making Queen Victoria Empress of India. The caption reads "New crowns for old ones!"

British imperial strength was underpinned by the steamship and the telegraph, new technologies invented in the second half of the 19th century, allowing it to control and defend the empire. By 1902, the British Empire was linked together by a network of telegraph cables, the All Red Line.

=== East India Company rule and the British Raj in India ===
The East India Company drove the expansion of the British Empire in Asia. The company's army had first joined forces with the Royal Navy during the Seven Years' War, and the two continued to co-operate in arenas outside India: the eviction of the French from Egypt (1799), the capture of Java from the Netherlands (1811), the acquisition of Penang Island (1786), Singapore (February 1819) and Malacca (March 1824), and the defeat of Burma (1826).

From its base in India, the company had been engaged in an increasingly profitable opium export trade to Qing China since the 1730s. This trade, illegal since it was outlawed by China in 1729, helped reverse the trade imbalances resulting from the British imports of tea, which saw large outflows of silver from Britain to China. In 1839, the confiscation by the Chinese authorities at Canton of 20,000 chests of opium led Britain to attack China in the First Opium War, and resulted in the seizure by Britain of Hong Kong Island, at that time a minor settlement, and other treaty ports including Shanghai.

During the late 18th and early 19th centuries, the British Crown began to assume an increasingly large role in the affairs of the company. A series of acts of Parliament were passed, including the Regulating Act 1773, East India Company Act 1784 and the Charter Act 1813 which regulated the company's affairs and established the sovereignty of the Crown over the territories that it had acquired. The company's eventual end was precipitated by the Indian Rebellion in 1857, a conflict that had begun with the mutiny of sepoys, Indian troops under British officers and discipline. The rebellion took six months to suppress, with heavy loss of life on both sides. The following year the British government dissolved the company and assumed direct control over India through the Government of India Act 1858, establishing the British Raj, where an appointed governor-general administered India and Queen Victoria was crowned the Empress of India. India became the empire's most valuable possession, "the Jewel in the Crown", and was the most important source of Britain's strength.

A series of serious crop failures in the late 19th century led to widespread famines on the subcontinent in which it is estimated that over 15 million people died. The East India Company had failed to implement any coordinated policy to deal with the famines during its period of rule. Later, under direct British rule, commissions were set up after each famine to investigate the causes and implement new policies, which took until the early 1900s to have an effect.

=== New Zealand ===
On each of his three voyages to the Pacific between 1769 and 1777, James Cook visited New Zealand. He was followed by an assortment of Europeans and Americans which including whalers, sealers, escaped convicts from New South Wales, missionaries and adventurers. Initially, contact with the indigenous Māori people was limited to the trading of goods, although interaction increased during the early decades of the 19th century with many trading and missionary stations being set up, especially in the north. The first of several Church of England missionaries arrived in 1814 and as well as their missionary role, they soon become the only form of European authority in a land that was not subject to British jurisdiction: the closest authority being the New South Wales governor in Sydney. The sale of weapons to Māori resulted from 1818 on in the intertribal warfare of the Musket Wars, with devastating consequences for the Māori population.

The UK government finally decided to act, dispatching Captain William Hobson with instructions to take formal possession after obtaining native consent. There was no central Māori authority able to represent all New Zealand so, on 6 February 1840, Hobson and many Māori chiefs signed the Treaty of Waitangi in the Bay of Islands; most other chiefs signing in stages over the following months. William Hobson declared British sovereignty over all New Zealand on 21 May 1840, over the North Island by cession and over the South Island by discovery (the island was sparsely populated and deemed terra nullius). Hobson became Lieutenant-Governor, subject to Governor Sir George Gipps in Sydney, with British possession of New Zealand initially administered from Australia as a dependency of the New South Wales colony. From 16 June 1840 New South Wales laws applied in New Zealand. This transitional arrangement ended with the Charter for Erecting the Colony of New Zealand on 16 November 1840. The Charter stated that New Zealand would be established as a separate Crown colony on 3 May 1841 with Hobson as its governor.

=== Rivalry with Russia ===
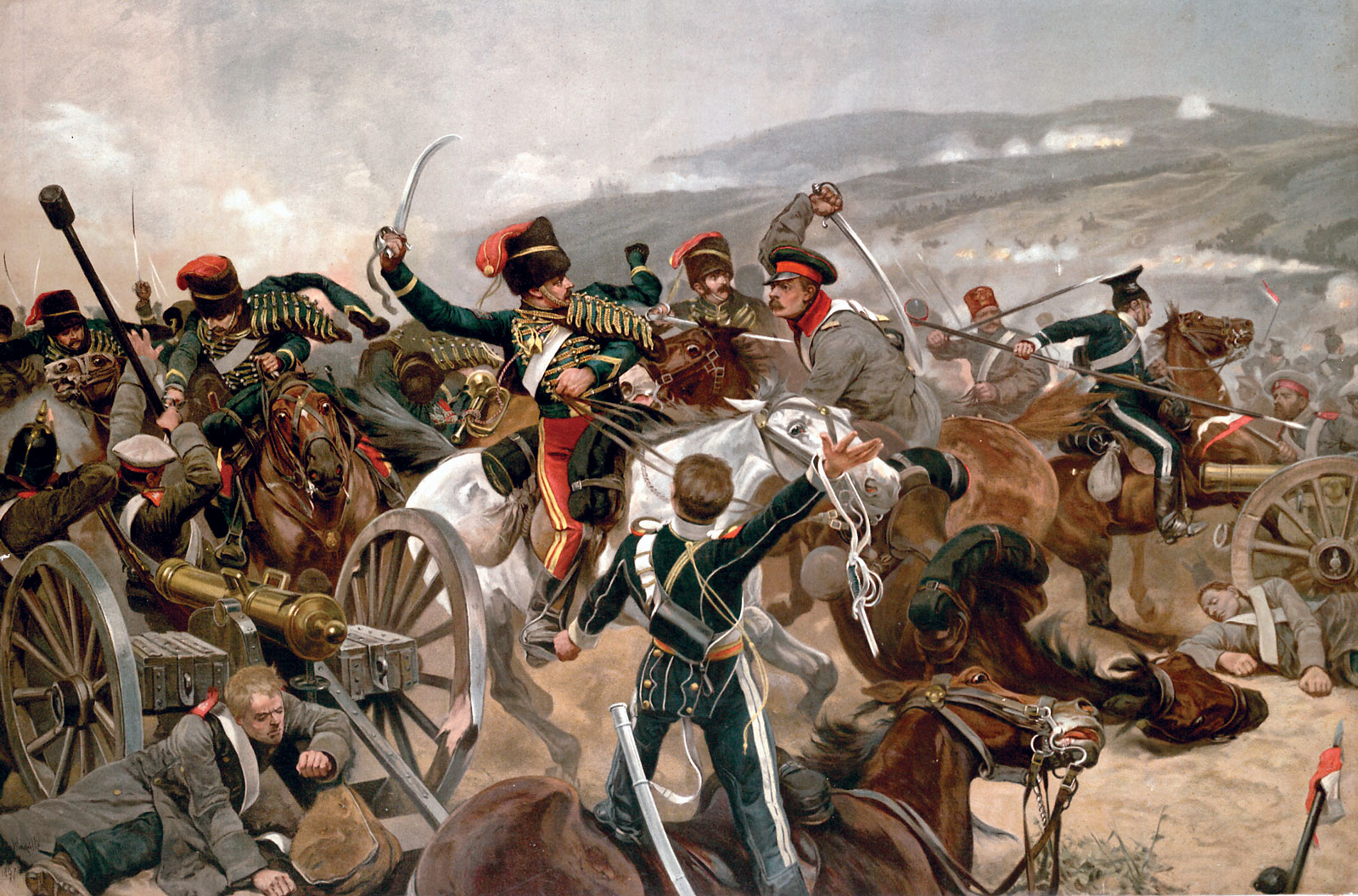
British cavalry charging against Russian forces at Balaclava in 1854

During the 19th century Britain and the Russian Empire vied to fill the power vacuums that had been left by the declining Ottoman Empire, Qajar dynasty and Qing dynasty. This rivalry in Central Asia came to be known as the "Great Game". As far as Britain was concerned, defeats inflicted by Russia on Persia and Turkey demonstrated its imperial ambitions and capabilities and stoked fears in Britain of an overland invasion of India. In 1839, Britain moved to pre-empt this by invading Afghanistan, but the First Anglo-Afghan War was a disaster for Britain.

When Russia invaded the Ottoman Balkans in 1853, fears of Russian dominance in the Mediterranean and the Middle East led Britain and France to enter the war in support of the Ottoman Empire and invade the Crimean Peninsula to destroy Russian naval capabilities. The ensuing Crimean War (1854–1856), which involved new techniques of modern warfare, was the only global war fought between Britain and another imperial power during the Pax Britannica and was a resounding defeat for Russia. The situation remained unresolved in Central Asia for two more decades, with Britain annexing Baluchistan in 1876 and Russia annexing Kirghizia, Kazakhstan, and Turkmenistan. For a while, it appeared that another war would be inevitable, but the two countries reached an agreement on their respective spheres of influence in the region in 1878 and on all outstanding matters in 1907 with the signing of the Anglo-Russian Entente. The destruction of the Imperial Russian Navy by the Imperial Japanese Navy at the Battle of Tsushima during the Russo-Japanese War of 1904–1905 limited its threat to the British.

=== Cape to Cairo ===
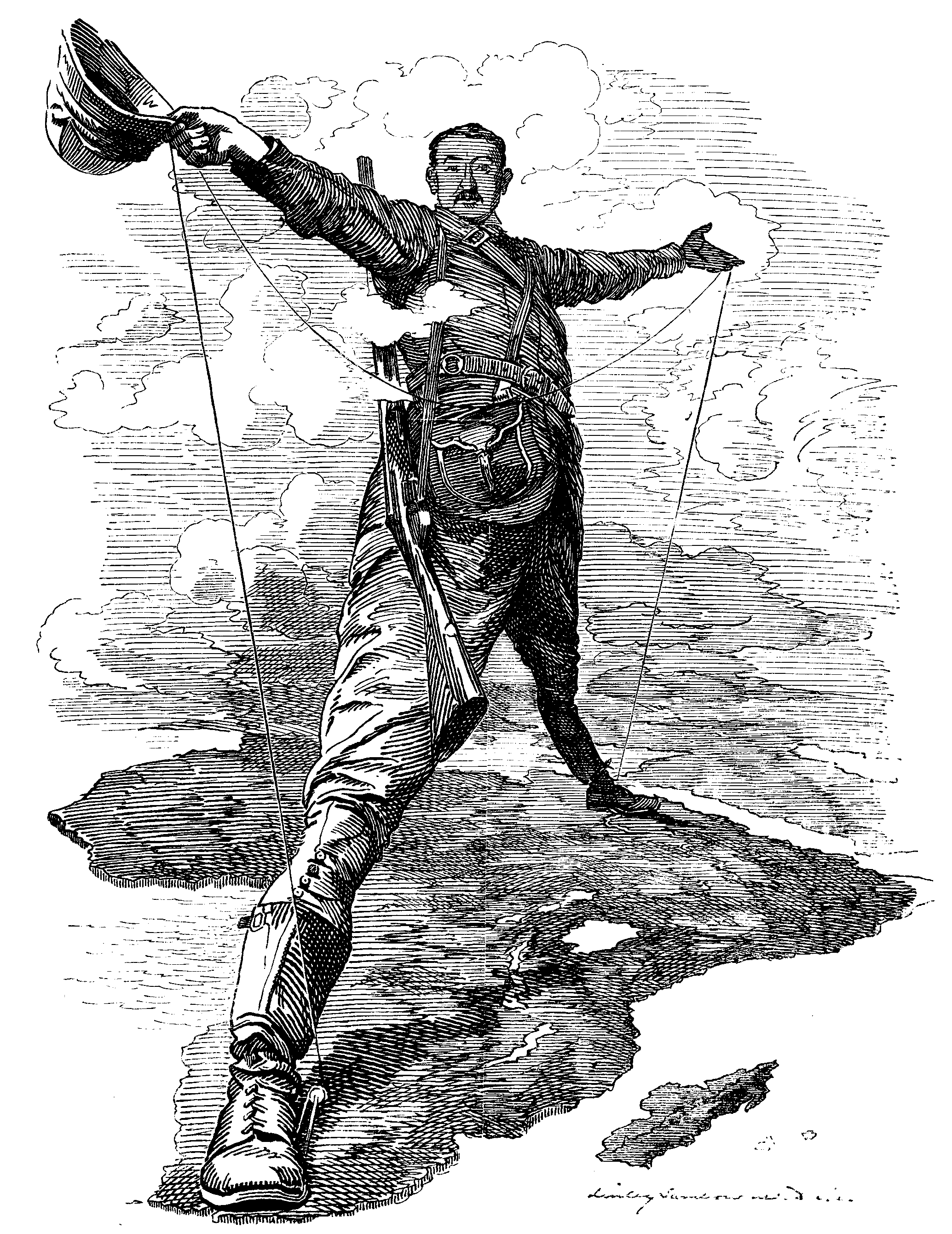
The Rhodes Colossus—Cecil Rhodes spanning "Cape to Cairo"

The Dutch East India Company had founded the Dutch Cape Colony on the southern tip of Africa in 1652 as a way station for its ships travelling to and from its colonies in the East Indies. Britain formally acquired the colony, and its large Afrikaner (or Boer) population in 1806, having occupied it in 1795 to prevent its falling into French hands during the Flanders Campaign. British immigration to the Cape Colony began to rise after 1820, and pushed thousands of Boers, resentful of British rule, northwards to found their own—mostly short-lived—independent republics, during the Great Trek of the late 1830s and early 1840s. In the process the Voortrekkers clashed repeatedly with the British, who had their own agenda with regard to colonial expansion in South Africa and to the various native African polities, including those of the Sotho people and the Zulu Kingdom. Eventually, the Boers established two republics that had a longer lifespan: the South African Republic or Transvaal Republic (1852–1877; 1881–1902) and the Orange Free State (1854–1902). In 1902 Britain occupied both republics, concluding a treaty with the two Boer Republics following the Second Boer War (1899–1902).

In 1869 the Suez Canal opened under Napoleon III, linking the Mediterranean Sea with the Indian Ocean. Initially the Canal was opposed by the British; but once opened, its strategic value was quickly recognised and became the "jugular vein of the Empire". In 1875, the Conservative government of Benjamin Disraeli bought the indebted Egyptian ruler Isma'il Pasha's 44 per cent shareholding in the Suez Canal for £4 million (equivalent to £400 million in 2025). Although this did not grant outright control of the strategic waterway, it did give Britain leverage. Joint Anglo-French financial control over Egypt ended in outright British occupation in 1882. Although Britain controlled the Khedivate of Egypt into the 20th century, it was officially a vassal state of the Ottoman Empire and not part of the British Empire. The French were still majority shareholders and attempted to weaken the British position, but a compromise was reached with the 1888 Convention of Constantinople, which made the Canal officially neutral territory.

With competitive French, Belgian and Portuguese activity in the lower Congo River region undermining orderly colonisation of tropical Africa, the Berlin Conference of 1884–85 was held to regulate the competition between the European powers in what was called the "Scramble for Africa" by defining "effective occupation" as the criterion for international recognition of territorial claims. The scramble continued into the 1890s, and caused Britain to reconsider its decision in 1885 to withdraw from Sudan. A joint force of British and Egyptian troops defeated the Mahdist Army in 1896 and rebuffed an attempted French invasion at Fashoda in 1898. Sudan was nominally made an Anglo-Egyptian condominium, but a British colony in reality.

British gains in Southern and East Africa prompted Cecil Rhodes, pioneer of British expansion in Southern Africa, to urge a "Cape to Cairo" railway linking the strategically important Suez Canal to the mineral-rich south of the continent. During the 1880s and 1890s, Rhodes, with his privately owned British South Africa Company, occupied and annexed territories named after him, Rhodesia.

=== Changing status of the white colonies ===
A British Empire flag combining the arms of the dominions to represent their growing significance

The path to independence for the white colonies of the British Empire began with the 1839 Durham Report, which proposed unification and self-government for Upper and Lower Canada, as a solution to political unrest which had erupted in armed rebellions in 1837. This began with the passing of the Act of Union in 1840, which created the Province of Canada. Responsible government was first granted to Nova Scotia in 1848, and was soon extended to the other British North American colonies. With the passage of the British North America Act, 1867 by the British Parliament, the Province of Canada, New Brunswick and Nova Scotia were formed into Canada, a confederation enjoying full self-government with the exception of international relations. Australia and New Zealand achieved similar levels of self-government after 1900, with the Australian colonies federating in 1901. The term "dominion status" was officially introduced at the 1907 Imperial Conference. As the dominions gained greater autonomy, they would come to be recognised as distinct realms of the empire with unique customs and symbols of their own. Imperial identity, through imagery such as patriotic artworks and banners, began developing into a form that attempted to be more inclusive by showcasing the empire as a family of newly birthed nations with common roots.

The last decades of the 19th century saw concerted political campaigns for Irish home rule. Ireland had been united with Britain into the United Kingdom of Great Britain and Ireland with the Act of Union 1800 after the Irish Rebellion of 1798, and had suffered a severe famine between 1845 and 1852. Home rule was supported by the British prime minister, William Gladstone, who hoped that Ireland might follow in Canada's footsteps as a Dominion within the empire, but his 1886 Home Rule bill was defeated in Parliament. Although the bill, if passed, would have granted Ireland less autonomy within the UK than the Canadian provinces had within their own federation, many MPs feared that a partially independent Ireland might pose a security threat to Great Britain or mark the beginning of the break-up of the empire. A second Home Rule bill was defeated for similar reasons. A third bill was passed by Parliament in 1914, but not implemented because of the outbreak of the First World War leading to the 1916 Easter Rising.

== World wars (1914–1945) ==
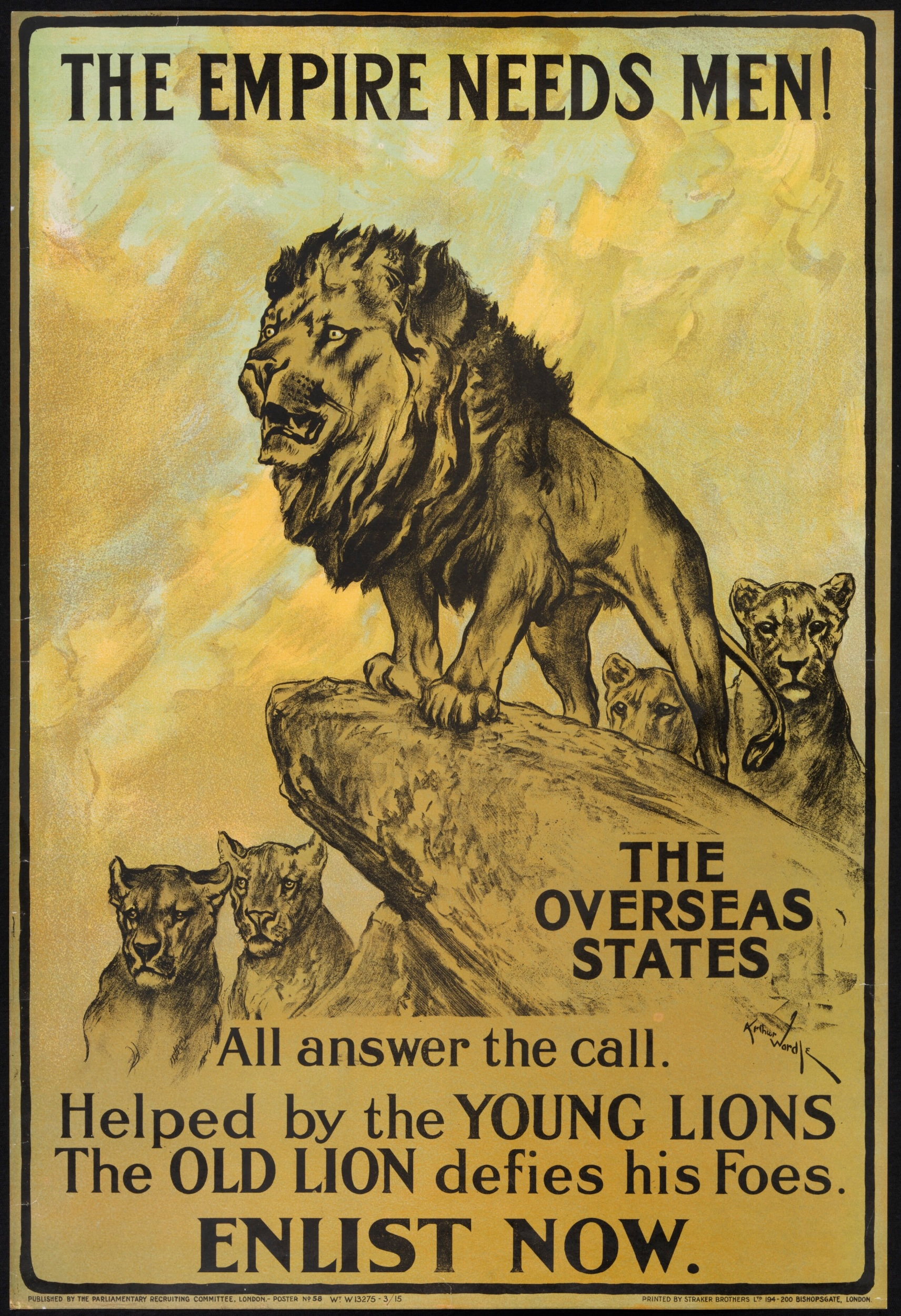
A poster urging men from countries of the British Empire to enlist

By the turn of the 20th century fears had begun to grow in Britain that it would no longer be able to defend the metropole and the entirety of the empire while at the same time maintaining the policy of "splendid isolation". Germany was rapidly rising as a military and industrial power and was now seen as the most likely opponent in any future war. Recognising that it was overstretched in the Pacific and threatened at home by the Imperial German Navy, Britain formed an alliance with Japan in 1902 and with its old enemies France and Russia in 1904 and 1907, respectively.

=== First World War ===
Britain's fears of war with Germany were realised in 1914 with the outbreak of the First World War. Britain quickly invaded and occupied most of Germany's overseas colonies in Africa. In the Pacific, Australia and New Zealand occupied German New Guinea and German Samoa respectively. Plans for a post-war division of the Ottoman Empire, which had joined the war on Germany's side, were secretly drawn up by Britain and France under the 1916 Sykes–Picot Agreement. This agreement was not divulged to the Sharif of Mecca, who the British had been encouraging to launch an Arab revolt against their Ottoman rulers, giving the impression that Britain was supporting the creation of an independent Arab state.

The British declaration of war on Germany and its allies committed the colonies and Dominions, which provided invaluable military, financial and material support. Over 2.5 million men served in the armies of the Dominions, as well as many thousands of volunteers from the Crown colonies. The contributions of Australian and New Zealand troops during the 1915 Gallipoli Campaign against the Ottoman Empire had a great impact on the national consciousness at home and marked a watershed in the transition of Australia and New Zealand from colonies to nations in their own right. The countries continue to commemorate this occasion on Anzac Day. Canadians viewed the Battle of Vimy Ridge in a similar light. The important contribution of the Dominions to the war effort was recognised in 1917 by British prime minister David Lloyd George when he invited each of the Dominion prime ministers to join an Imperial War Cabinet to co-ordinate imperial policy.

Under the terms of the concluding Treaty of Versailles signed in 1919, the empire reached its greatest extent with the addition of 1.8 million sq mi (4.7 million km^{2}) and 13 million new subjects. The colonies of Germany and the Ottoman Empire were distributed to the Allied powers as League of Nations mandates. Britain gained control of Palestine, Transjordan, Iraq, parts of Cameroon and Togoland, and Tanganyika. The Dominions themselves acquired mandates of their own: the Union of South Africa gained South West Africa (modern-day Namibia), Australia gained New Guinea, and New Zealand Western Samoa. Nauru was made a combined mandate of Britain and the two Pacific Dominions.

=== Inter-war period ===
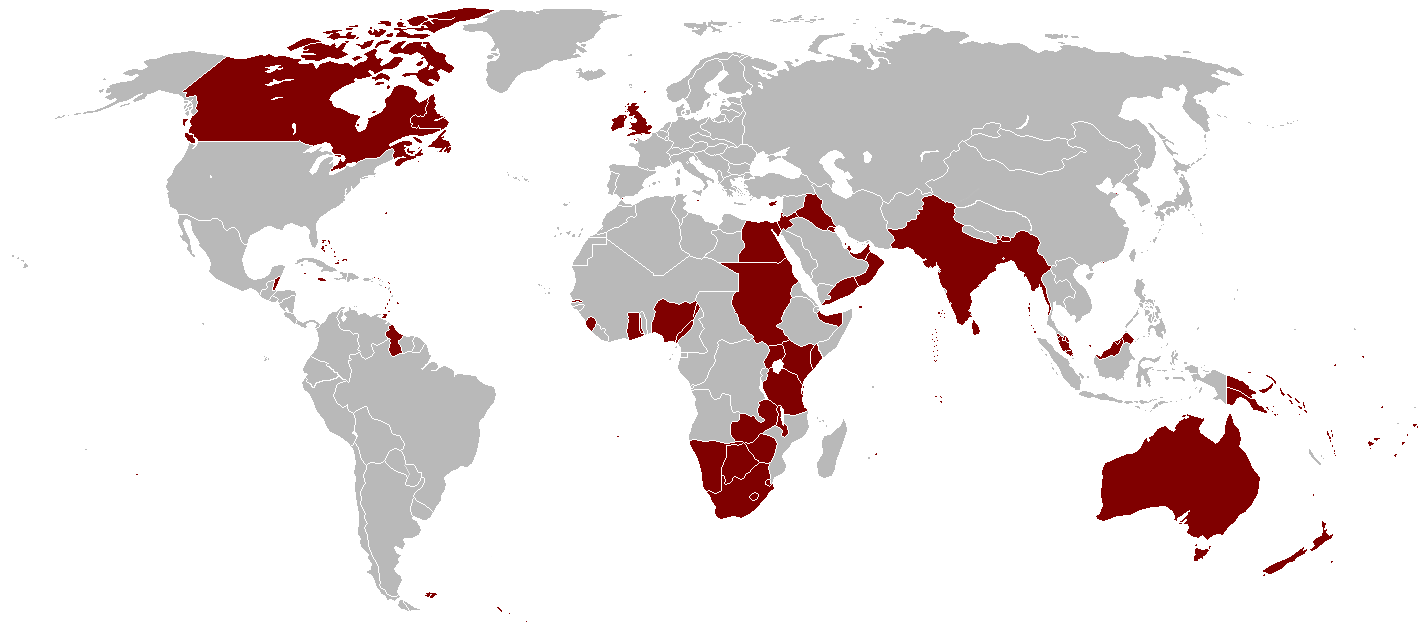
The British Empire at its territorial peak in 1921

The changing world order that the war had brought about, in particular the growth of the United States and Japan as naval powers, and the rise of independence movements in India and Ireland, caused a major reassessment of British imperial policy. Forced to choose between alignment with the United States or Japan, Britain opted not to renew its Anglo-Japanese Alliance and instead signed the 1922 Washington Naval Treaty, where Britain accepted naval parity with the United States. This decision was the source of much debate in Britain during the 1930s as militaristic governments took hold in Germany and Japan helped in part by the Great Depression, for it was feared that the empire could not survive a simultaneous attack by both nations. The issue of the empire's security was a serious concern in Britain, as it was vital to the British economy.

In 1919 the frustrations caused by delays to Irish home rule led the MPs of Sinn Féin, a pro-independence party that had won a majority of the Irish seats in the 1918 British general election, to establish an independent parliament in Dublin, at which Irish independence was declared. The Irish Republican Army simultaneously began a guerrilla war against the British administration. The Irish War of Independence ended in 1921 with a stalemate and the signing of the Anglo-Irish Treaty, creating the Irish Free State, a Dominion within the British Empire, with effective internal independence but still constitutionally linked with the British Crown. Northern Ireland, consisting of six of the 32 Irish counties which had been established as a devolved region under the 1920 Government of Ireland Act, immediately exercised its option under the treaty to retain its existing status within the United Kingdom.

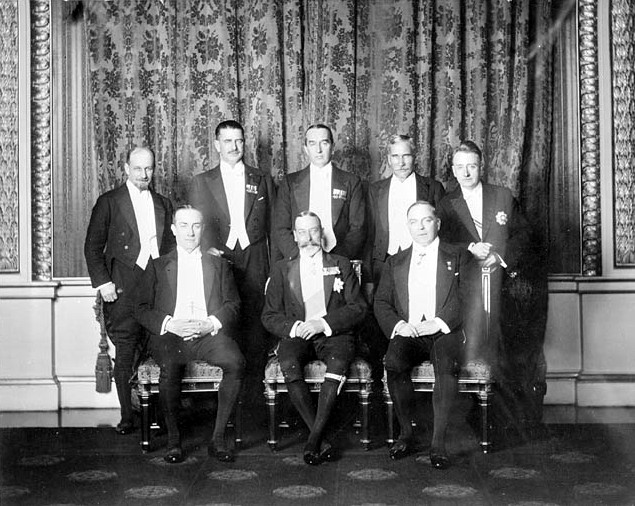
George V (Seated front) with British and Dominion prime ministers at the 1926 Imperial Conference. Standing (left to right): W.S. Monroe (Newfoundland), Gordon Coates (New Zealand), Stanley Bruce (Australia), J. B. M. Hertzog (Union of South Africa), W. T. Cosgrave (Irish Free State). Seated left: Stanley Baldwin (United Kingdom), seated right: William Mackenzie King (Canada)

A similar struggle began in India when the Government of India Act 1919 failed to satisfy the demand for independence. Concerns over communist and foreign plots following the Ghadar conspiracy ensured that war-time strictures were renewed by the Rowlatt Acts. This led to tension, particularly in the Punjab region, where repressive measures culminated in the Amritsar Massacre. In Britain, public opinion was divided over the morality of the massacre, between those who saw it as having saved India from anarchy, and those who viewed it with revulsion. The non-cooperation movement was called off in March 1922 following the Chauri Chaura incident, and discontent continued to simmer for the next 25 years.

In 1922 Egypt, which had been declared a British protectorate at the outbreak of the First World War, was granted formal independence, though it continued to be a British client state until 1954. British troops remained stationed in Egypt until the signing of the Anglo-Egyptian Treaty in 1936, under which it was agreed that the troops would withdraw but continue to occupy and defend the Suez Canal zone. In return, Egypt was assisted in joining the League of Nations. Iraq, a British mandate since 1920, gained membership of the League in its own right after achieving independence from Britain in 1932. In Palestine, Britain was presented with the problem of mediating between the Arabs and increasing numbers of Jews. The Balfour Declaration, which had been incorporated into the terms of the mandate, stated that a national home for the Jewish people would be established in Palestine, and Jewish immigration allowed up to a limit that would be determined by the mandatory power. This led to increasing conflict with the Arab population, who openly revolted in 1936. As the threat of war with Germany increased during the 1930s, Britain judged the support of Arabs as more important than the establishment of a Jewish homeland, and shifted to a pro-Arab stance, limiting Jewish immigration and in turn triggering a Jewish insurgency.

The right of the Dominions to set their own foreign policy, independent of Britain, was recognised at the 1923 Imperial Conference. Britain's request for military assistance from the Dominions at the outbreak of the Chanak Crisis the previous year had been turned down by Canada and South Africa, and Canada had refused to be bound by the 1923 Treaty of Lausanne. After pressure from the Irish Free State and South Africa, the 1926 Imperial Conference issued the Balfour Declaration of 1926, declaring Britain and the Dominions to be "autonomous Communities within the British Empire, equal in status, in no way subordinate one to another" within a "British Commonwealth of Nations". This declaration was given legal substance under the 1931 Statute of Westminster. The parliaments of Canada, Australia, New Zealand, the Union of South Africa, the Irish Free State and Newfoundland were now independent of British legislative control: they could nullify British laws and Britain could no longer pass laws for them without their consent. Newfoundland reverted to colonial status in 1933, suffering from financial difficulties during the Great Depression. In 1937 the Irish Free State introduced a republican constitution renaming itself Ireland.

=== Second World War ===
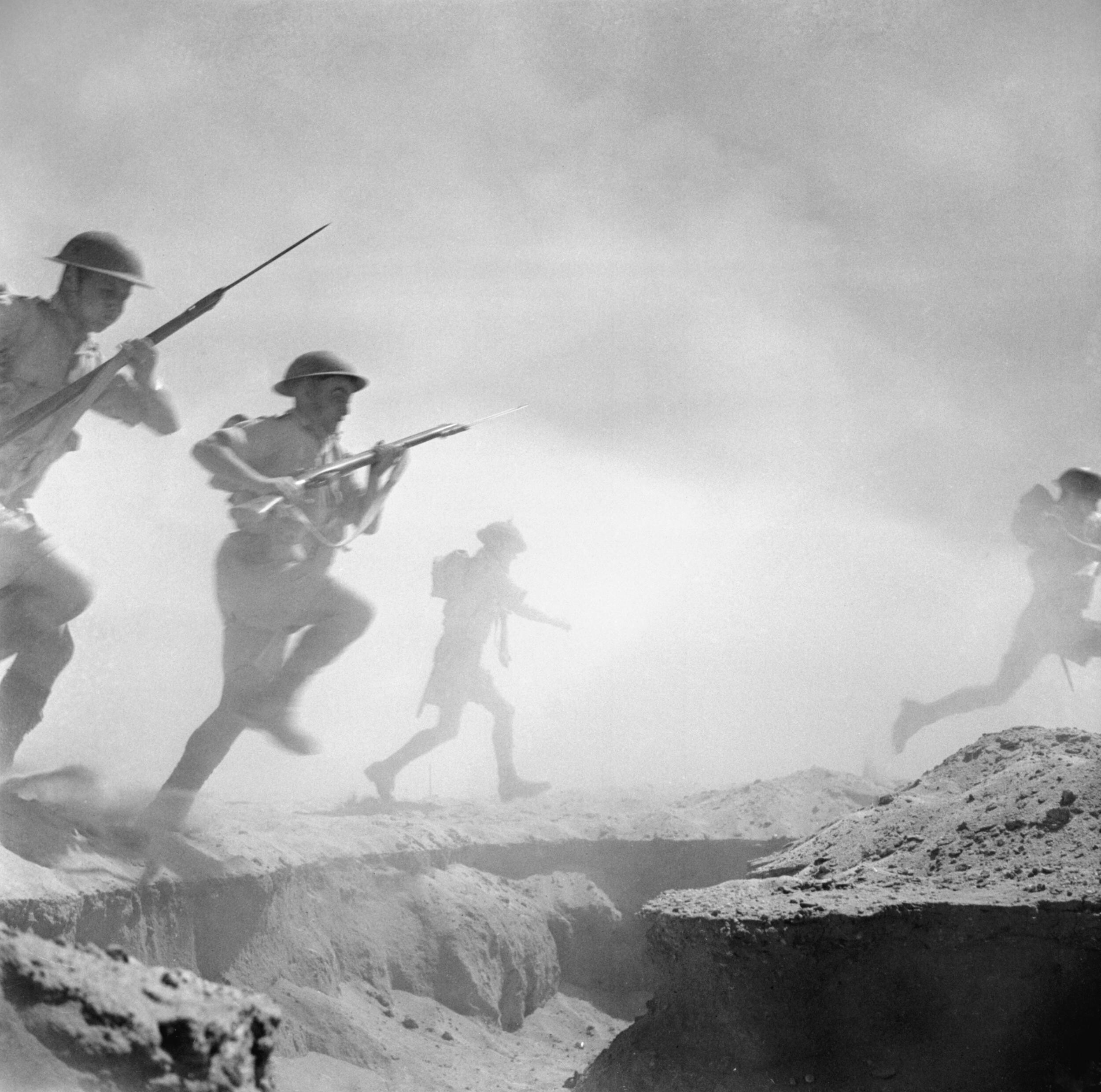
During the Second World War, the Eighth Army was made up of units from many different countries in the British Empire and Commonwealth; it fought in the North African and Italian campaigns.

Britain's declaration of war against Nazi Germany in September 1939 included the Crown colonies and India but did not automatically commit the Dominions of Australia, Canada, New Zealand, Newfoundland and South Africa. All soon declared war on Germany. While Britain continued to regard Ireland as still within the British Commonwealth, Ireland chose to remain legally neutral throughout the war.

After the Fall of France in June 1940, Britain and the empire stood alone against Germany, until the German invasion of Greece on 7 April 1941. British Prime Minister Winston Churchill successfully lobbied US President Franklin D. Roosevelt for military aid from the United States, but Roosevelt was not yet ready to ask Congress to commit the country to war. In August 1941, Churchill and Roosevelt met and agreed the Atlantic Charter, which included the statement that "the rights of all peoples to choose the form of government under which they live" should be respected. This wording was ambiguous as to whether it referred to European countries invaded by Germany and Italy, or the peoples colonised by European nations, and would later be interpreted differently by the British, Americans, and nationalist movements. Nevertheless, Churchill rejected its universal applicability when it came to the self-determination of subject nations including the British Indian Empire. Churchill further added that he did not become Prime Minister to oversee the liquidation of the empire.

For Churchill, the entry of the United States into the war was the "greatest joy". He felt that Britain was now assured of victory, but failed to recognise that the "many disasters, immeasurable costs and tribulations [which he knew] lay ahead" in December 1941 would have permanent consequences for the future of the empire. The manner in which British forces were rapidly defeated in the Far East irreversibly harmed Britain's standing and prestige as an imperial power, including, particularly, the Fall of Singapore, which had previously been hailed as an impregnable fortress and the eastern equivalent of Gibraltar. The realisation that Britain could not defend its entire empire pushed Australia and New Zealand, which now appeared threatened by Japanese forces, into closer ties with the United States and, ultimately, the 1951 ANZUS Pact. The war weakened the empire in other ways: undermining Britain's control of politics in India, inflicting long-term economic damage, and irrevocably changing geopolitics by pushing the Soviet Union and the United States to the centre of the global stage.

Conversely, by the end of the war British administration had expanded to the former territories of the Italian Empire, including Libya, Eritrea, Ogaden and Somaliland.

== Decolonisation and decline (1945–1997) ==
Though Britain and the empire emerged victorious from the Second World War, the effects of the conflict were profound, both at home and abroad. Much of Europe, a continent that had dominated the world for several centuries, was in ruins, and host to the armies of the United States and the Soviet Union, who now held the balance of global power. Britain was left essentially bankrupt, with insolvency only averted in 1946 after the negotiation of a US$3.75 billion loan from the United States, the last installment of which was repaid in 2006. At the same time, anti-colonial movements were on the rise in the colonies of European nations. The situation was complicated further by the increasing Cold War rivalry of the United States and the Soviet Union. In principle, both nations were opposed to European colonialism. In practice, American anti-communism prevailed over anti-imperialism, and therefore the United States supported the continued existence of the British Empire to keep Communist expansion in check. At first, British politicians believed it would be possible to maintain Britain's role as a world power at the head of a re-imagined Commonwealth, but by 1960 they were forced to recognise that there was an irresistible "wind of change" blowing. Their priorities changed to maintaining an extensive zone of British influence and ensuring that stable, non-Communist governments were established in former colonies. In this context, while other European powers such as France and Portugal waged costly and unsuccessful wars to keep their empires intact, Britain generally adopted a policy of peaceful disengagement from its colonies, although violence occurred in Malaya, Kenya and Palestine. Between 1945 and 1965, the number of people under British rule outside the UK itself fell from 700 million to 5 million, 3 million of whom were in Hong Kong.

=== Initial disengagement ===
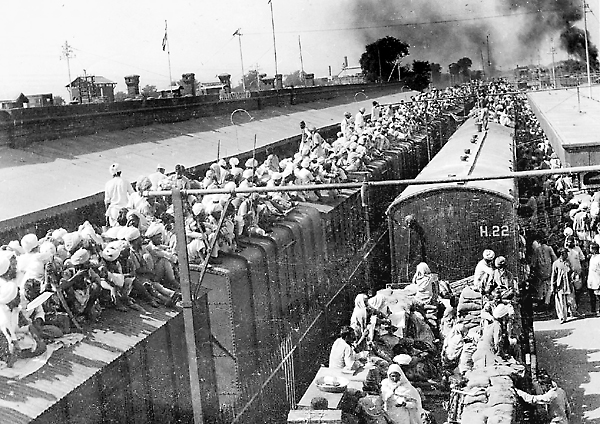
About 14.5 million people lost their homes as a result of the partition of India in 1947.

The pro-decolonisation Labour government, elected at the 1945 general election and led by Clement Attlee, moved quickly to tackle the most pressing issue facing the empire: Indian independence. India's major political party—the Indian National Congress (led by Mahatma Gandhi)—had been campaigning for independence for decades, but disagreed with Muslim League (led by Muhammad Ali Jinnah) as to how it should be implemented. Congress favoured a unified secular Indian state, whereas the League, fearing domination by the Hindu majority, desired a separate Islamic state for Muslim-majority regions. Increasing civil unrest led Attlee to promise independence no later than 30 June 1948. When the urgency of the situation and risk of civil war became apparent, the newly appointed (and last) Viceroy, Lord Mountbatten, hastily brought forward the date to 15 August 1947. The borders drawn by the British to broadly partition India into Hindu and Muslim areas left tens of millions as minorities in the newly independent states of India and Pakistan. The princely states were provided with a choice to either remain independent or join India or Pakistan. Millions of Hindus & Sikhs crossed from Pakistan to India and Muslims vice versa, and violence between the two communities cost hundreds of thousands of lives. Burma, which had been administered as part of British India until 1937, gained independence the following year in 1948 along with Sri Lanka (formerly known as British Ceylon). India, Pakistan and Sri Lanka became members of the Commonwealth, while Burma chose not to join. That same year, the British Nationality Act was enacted, in hopes of strengthening and unifying the Commonwealth: it provided British citizenship and right of entry to all those living within its jurisdiction.

The British Mandate in Palestine, where an Arab majority lived alongside a Jewish minority, presented the British with a similar problem to that of India. The matter was complicated by large numbers of Jewish refugees seeking to be admitted to Palestine following the Holocaust, while Arabs were opposed to the creation of a Jewish state. Frustrated by the intractability of the problem, attacks by Jewish paramilitary organisations and the increasing cost of maintaining its military presence, Britain announced in 1947 that it would withdraw in 1948 and leave the matter to the United Nations to solve. The UN General Assembly subsequently voted for a plan to partition Palestine into a Jewish and an Arab state. It was immediately followed by the outbreak of a civil war between the Arabs and Jews of Palestine, and British forces withdrew amid the fighting. The British Mandate for Palestine officially terminated at midnight on 15 May 1948 as the State of Israel declared independence and the 1948 Arab-Israeli War broke out, during which the territory of the former Mandate became divided between Israel and the surrounding Arab states. Amid the fighting, British forces continued to withdraw from Israel, with the last British troops departing from Haifa on 30 June 1948.

Following the surrender of Japan in the Second World War, anti-Japanese resistance movements in Malaya turned their attention towards the British, who had moved to quickly retake control of the colony, valuing it as a source of rubber and tin. The fact that the guerrillas were primarily Malaysian Chinese Communists meant that the British attempt to quell the uprising was supported by the Muslim Malay majority, on the understanding that once the insurgency had been quelled, independence would be granted. The Malayan Emergency, as it was called, began in 1948 and lasted until 1960, but by 1957, Britain felt confident enough to grant independence to the Federation of Malaya within the Commonwealth. In 1963, the 11 states of the federation together with Singapore, Sarawak and North Borneo joined to form Malaysia, but in 1965 Chinese-majority Singapore was expelled from the union following tensions between the Malay and Chinese populations and became an independent city-state. Brunei, which had been a British protectorate since 1888, declined to join the union.

=== Suez and its aftermath ===
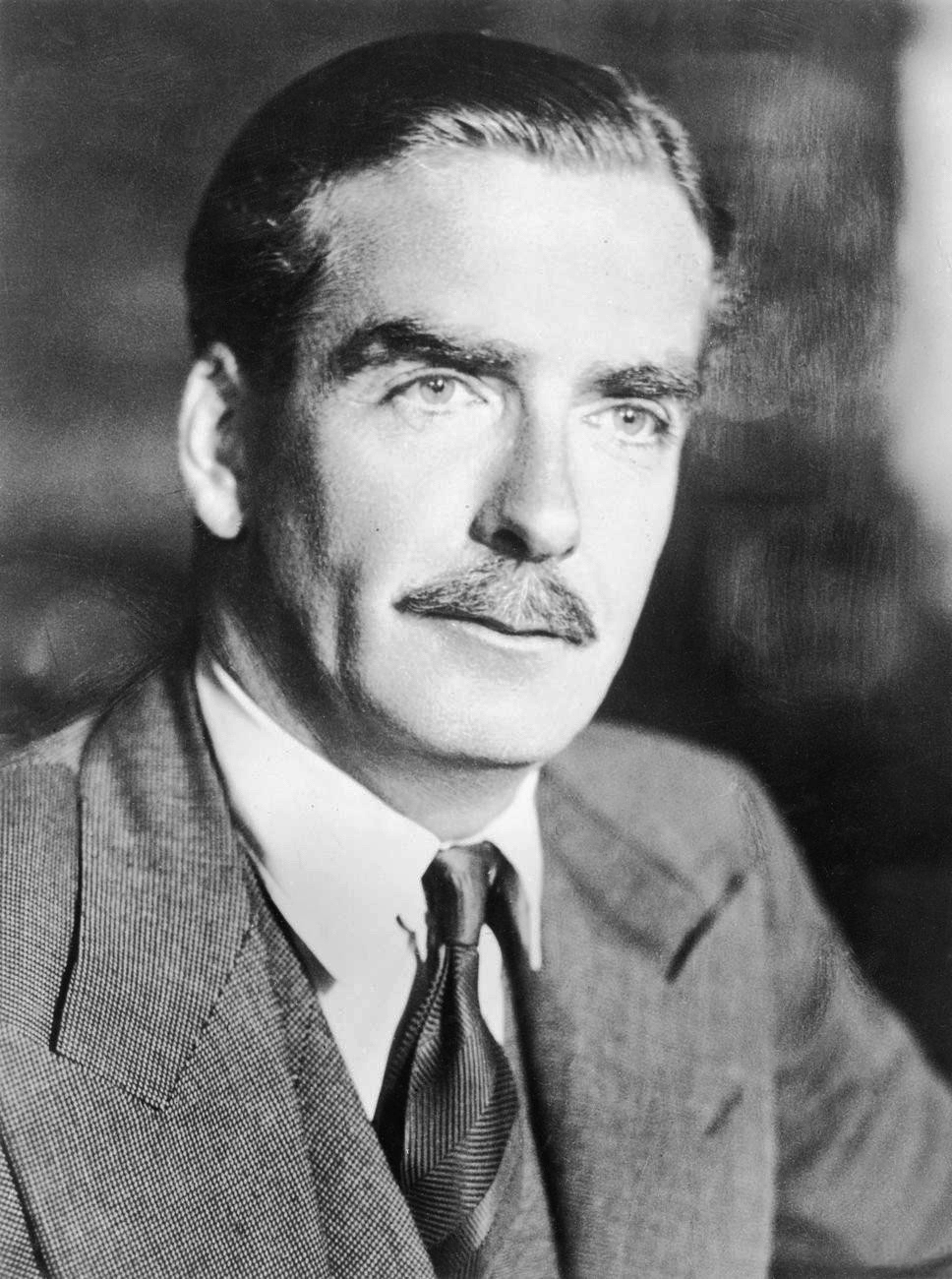
Eden's decision to invade Egypt in 1956 revealed Britain's post-war decline as a first-rate power.

In the 1951 general election, the Conservative Party returned to power in Britain under the leadership of Winston Churchill. Churchill and the Conservatives believed that Britain's position as a world power relied on the continued existence of the empire, with the base at the Suez Canal allowing Britain to maintain its pre-eminent position in the Middle East in spite of the loss of India. Churchill could not ignore Gamal Abdul Nasser's new revolutionary government of Egypt that had taken power in 1952, and the following year it was agreed that British troops would withdraw from the Suez Canal zone and that Sudan would be granted self-determination by 1955, with independence to follow Sudan was granted independence on 1 January 1956.

In July 1956 Nasser unilaterally nationalised the Suez Canal. The response of Anthony Eden, who had succeeded Churchill as Prime Minister, was to collude with France to engineer an Israeli attack on Egypt that would give Britain and France an excuse to intervene militarily and retake the canal. Eden infuriated US President Dwight D. Eisenhower by his lack of consultation, and Eisenhower refused to back the invasion. Another of Eisenhower's concerns was the possibility of a wider war with the Soviet Union after it threatened to intervene on the Egyptian side. Eisenhower applied financial leverage by threatening to sell US reserves of the British pound and thereby precipitate a collapse of the British currency. Though the invasion force was militarily successful in its objectives, UN intervention and US pressure forced Britain into a humiliating withdrawal of its forces, and Eden resigned.

The Suez Crisis very publicly exposed Britain's limitations to the world and confirmed Britain's decline on the world stage and its end as a first-rate power, demonstrating that henceforth it could no longer act without at least the acquiescence, if not the full support, of the United States. The events at Suez wounded British national pride, leading one Member of Parliament (MP) to describe it as "Britain's Waterloo" and another to suggest that the country had become an "American satellite". Margaret Thatcher later described the mindset she believed had befallen Britain's political leaders after Suez where they "went from believing that Britain could do anything to an almost neurotic belief that Britain could do nothing", from which Britain did not recover until the successful recapture of the Falkland Islands from Argentina in 1982.

While the Suez Crisis caused British power in the Middle East to weaken, it did not collapse. Britain again deployed its armed forces to the region, intervening in Oman (1957), Jordan (1958) and Kuwait (1961), though on these occasions with American approval, as the new Prime Minister Harold Macmillan's foreign policy was to remain firmly aligned with the United States. Although Britain granted Kuwait independence in 1961, it continued to maintain a military presence in the Middle East for another decade. On 16 January 1968, a few weeks after the devaluation of the pound, Prime Minister Harold Wilson and his Defence Secretary Denis Healey announced that British Armed Forces troops would be withdrawn from major military bases East of Suez, which included the ones in the Middle East, and primarily from Malaysia and Singapore by the end of 1971, instead of 1975 as earlier planned. By that time over 50,000 British military personnel were still stationed in the Far East, including 30,000 in Singapore. The British granted independence to the Maldives in 1965 but continued to station a garrison there until 1976, withdrew from Aden in 1967, and granted independence to Bahrain, Qatar, and the United Arab Emirates in 1971.

=== Wind of change ===
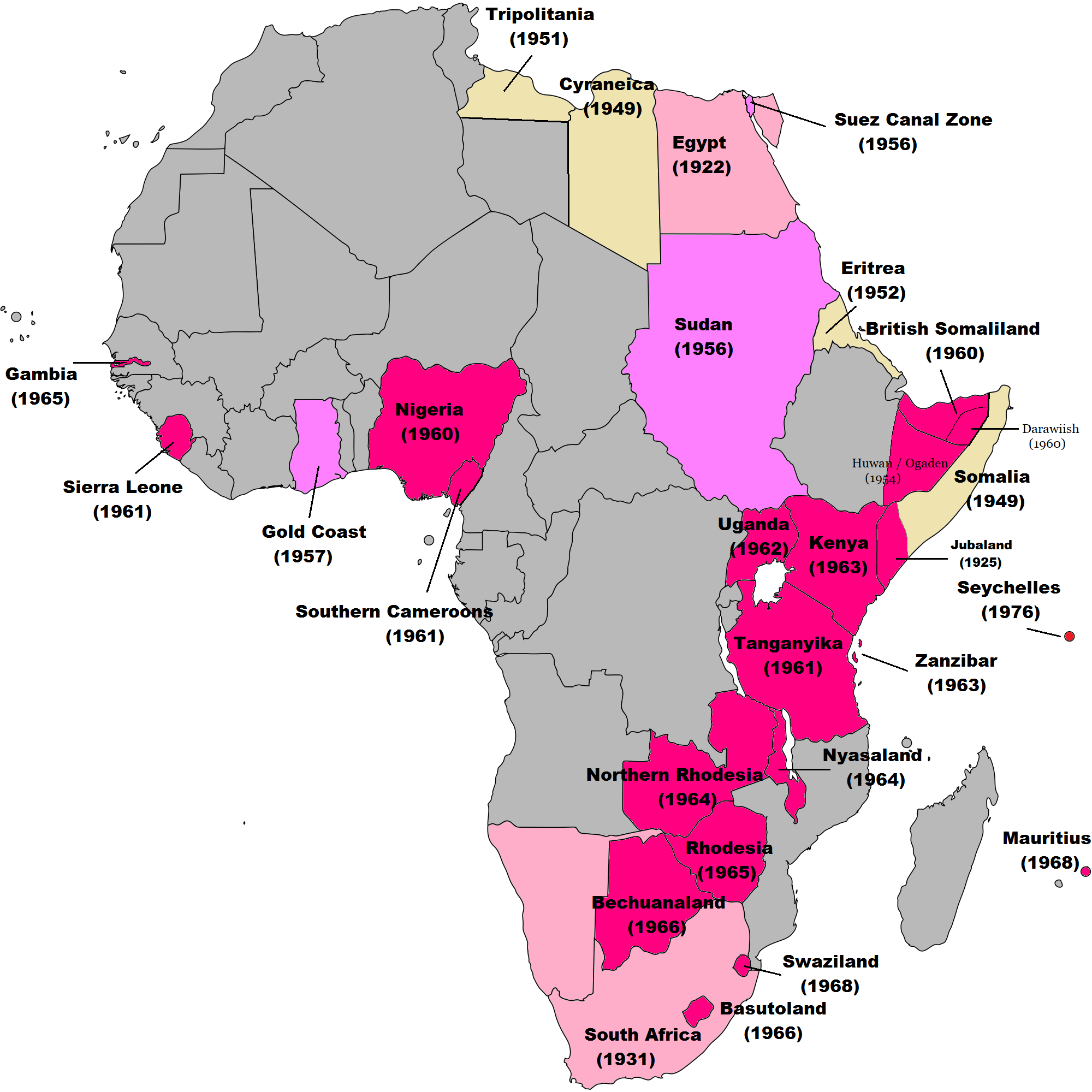
British decolonisation in Africa. By the end of the 1960s, all but Rhodesia (the future Zimbabwe) and the South African mandate of South West Africa (Namibia) had achieved recognised independence.

Macmillan gave a speech in Cape Town, South Africa in February 1960 where he spoke of "the wind of change blowing through this continent". Macmillan wished to avoid the same kind of colonial war that France was fighting in Algeria, and under his premiership decolonisation proceeded rapidly. To the three colonies that had been granted independence in the 1950s—Sudan, the Gold Coast and Malaya—were added nearly ten times that number during the 1960s. Owing to the rapid pace of decolonisation during this period, the cabinet post of Secretary of State for the Colonies was abolished in 1966, along with the Colonial Office, which merged with the Commonwealth Relations Office to form the Foreign and Commonwealth Office (now the Foreign, Commonwealth and Development Office) in October 1968.

Britain's remaining colonies in Africa, except for self-governing Southern Rhodesia, were all granted independence by 1968. British withdrawal from the southern and eastern parts of Africa was not a peaceful process. From 1952 the Kenya Colony saw the eight-year long Mau Mau rebellion, in which tens of thousands of suspected rebels were interned by the colonial government in detention camps to suppress the rebellion and over 1000 convicts executed, with records systematically destroyed. Throughout the 1960s, the British government took a "No independence until majority rule" policy towards decolonising the empire, leading the white minority government of Southern Rhodesia to enact the 1965 Unilateral Declaration of Independence from Britain, resulting in a civil war that lasted until the British-mediated Lancaster House Agreement of 1979. The agreement saw the British Empire temporarily re-establish the Colony of Southern Rhodesia from 1979 to 1980 as a transitionary government to a majority rule Republic of Zimbabwe. This was the last British possession in Africa.

In Cyprus a guerrilla war waged by the Greek Cypriot organisation EOKA against British rule, was ended in 1959 by the London and Zürich Agreements, which resulted in Cyprus being granted independence in 1960. The UK retained the military bases of Akrotiri and Dhekelia as sovereign base areas. The Mediterranean colony of Malta was amicably granted independence from the UK in 1964 and became the country of Malta, though the idea had been raised in 1955 of integration with Britain.

Most of the UK's Caribbean territories achieved independence after the departure in 1961 and 1962 of Jamaica and Trinidad from the West Indies Federation, established in 1958 in an attempt to unite the British Caribbean colonies under one government, but which collapsed following the loss of its two largest members. Jamaica attained independence in 1962, as did Trinidad and Tobago. Barbados achieved independence in 1966 and the remainder of the eastern Caribbean islands, including the Bahamas, in the 1970s and 1980s, but Anguilla and the Turks and Caicos Islands opted to revert to British rule after they had already started on the path to independence. The British Virgin Islands, the Cayman Islands and Montserrat opted to retain ties with Britain, while Guyana achieved independence in 1966. Britain's last colony on the American mainland, British Honduras, became a self-governing colony in 1964 and was renamed Belize in 1973, achieving full independence in 1981. A dispute with Guatemala over claims to Belize was left unresolved.

British Overseas Territories in the Pacific acquired independence in the 1970s beginning with Fiji in 1970 and ending with Vanuatu in 1980. Vanuatu's independence was delayed because of political conflict between English and French-speaking communities, as the islands had been jointly administered as a condominium with France. Fiji, Papua New Guinea, Solomon Islands and Tuvalu became Commonwealth realms.

=== End of empire ===
By 1981, aside from a scattering of islands and outposts, the process of decolonisation that had begun after the Second World War was largely complete. In 1982, Britain's resolve in defending its remaining overseas territories was tested when Argentina invaded the Falkland Islands, acting on a long-standing claim that dated back to the Spanish Empire. Britain's successful military response to retake the Falkland Islands during the ensuing Falklands War contributed to reversing the downward trend in Britain's status as a world power.

The 1980s saw Canada, Australia, and New Zealand sever their final constitutional links with Britain. Although granted legislative independence by the Statute of Westminster 1931, vestigial constitutional links had remained in place. The British Parliament retained the power to amend key Canadian constitutional statutes, meaning that an act of the British Parliament was required to make certain changes to the Canadian Constitution. The British Parliament had the power to pass laws extending to Canada at Canadian request. Although no longer able to pass any laws that would apply to Australian Commonwealth law, the British Parliament retained the power to legislate for the individual Australian states. With regard to New Zealand, the British Parliament retained the power to pass legislation applying to New Zealand with the New Zealand Parliament's consent. In 1982, the last legal link between Canada and Britain was severed by the Canada Act 1982, which was passed by the British parliament, formally patriating the Canadian Constitution. The act ended the need for British involvement in changes to the Canadian constitution. Similarly, the Australia Act 1986 (effective 3 March 1986) severed the constitutional link between Britain and the Australian states, while New Zealand's Constitution Act 1986 (effective 1 January 1987) reformed the constitution of New Zealand to sever its constitutional link with Britain.

On 1 January 1984, Brunei, Britain's last remaining Asian protectorate, was granted full independence. Independence had been delayed due to the opposition of the Sultan, who had preferred British protection.

In September 1982 the Prime Minister, Margaret Thatcher, travelled to Beijing to negotiate with the Chinese Communist government, on the future of Britain's last major and most populous overseas territory, Hong Kong. Under the terms of the 1842 Treaty of Nanking and 1860 Convention of Peking, Hong Kong Island and Kowloon Peninsula had been respectively ceded to Britain in perpetuity, but the majority of the colony consisted of the New Territories, which had been acquired under a 99-year lease in 1898, due to expire in 1997. Thatcher, seeing parallels with the Falkland Islands, initially wished to hold Hong Kong and proposed British administration with Chinese sovereignty, though this was rejected by China. A deal was reached in 1984—under the terms of the Sino-British Joint Declaration, Hong Kong would become a special administrative region of the People's Republic of China. The handover ceremony in 1997 marked for many, including King Charles III, then Prince of Wales, who was in attendance, "the end of Empire", though many British territories that are remnants of the empire still remain.

== Legacy ==
The fourteen British Overseas Territories

Britain retains sovereignty over 14 territories outside the British Isles. In 1983, the British Nationality Act 1981 renamed the existing Crown Colonies as "British Dependent Territories", (Note: Schedule 6 of the British Nationality Act 1981 reclassified the remaining Crown colonies as "British Dependent Territories". The act entered into force on 1 January 1983) and in 2002 they were renamed "British Overseas Territories". Most former British colonies and protectorates have joined the Commonwealth of Nations, a voluntary association of equal members, comprising a total population of around 2.2 billion people. The United Kingdom and 14 other countries, collectively known as the Commonwealth realms, voluntarily continue to share the same person—King Charles III—as their respective head of state. These 15 countries are distinct and equal legal entities: the United Kingdom, Australia, Canada, New Zealand, Antigua and Barbuda, the Bahamas, Belize, Grenada, Jamaica, Papua New Guinea, Saint Kitts and Nevis, Saint Lucia, Saint Vincent and the Grenadines, the Solomon Islands and Tuvalu.

American and British interactions shaped the British Empire's breakup and the resulting world order

During the colonial era, education systems emphasised the study of the classical Greco-Roman heritage and of the resultant experience with empire, aiming to parse how to apply that heritage to improve the future of Britain's colonies. The hegemony of the United States, a country which throughout its early rise had challenged British claims to represent the "New Rome", became the successor to British global dominance in the mid-20th century; the two countries' historical ties and wartime collaboration eased a peaceful handoff of power after World War II. As for the United Kingdom itself, British views of the former Empire appear more positive than those in other post-imperial nations; discourse around the former Empire has continued to impact Britons' present-day understanding of themselves, as seen in the debate leading up to its decision to leave the European Union in 2016. Empire shaped habits, mentality, psychology, attitudes and ethnic makeup in post-Empire Britain.

Decades, and in some cases centuries, of British rule and migration have left their mark on independent countries that arose from the British Empire. The empire fostered the use of the English language in regions around the world. As of 2008 English is the primary language of up to 460 million people and is spoken by about 1.5 billion as a first, second or foreign language. English has also significantly influenced other languages. The British exported individual and team sports developed in Britain, particularly football, cricket, tennis, and golf. Some sports were also invented or standardised in the former colonies, such as badminton, polo, and snooker in India (Note: See also Sport in British India) British missionaries who travelled around the globe – often in advance of soldiers and civil servants – spread Protestantism (including Anglicanism) to all continents. The British Empire provided refuge for religiously persecuted continental Europeans for hundreds of years. British educational institutions remain popular in the present day, in part due to the importance of the English language and to the similarity of British curricula to those in the former colonies.

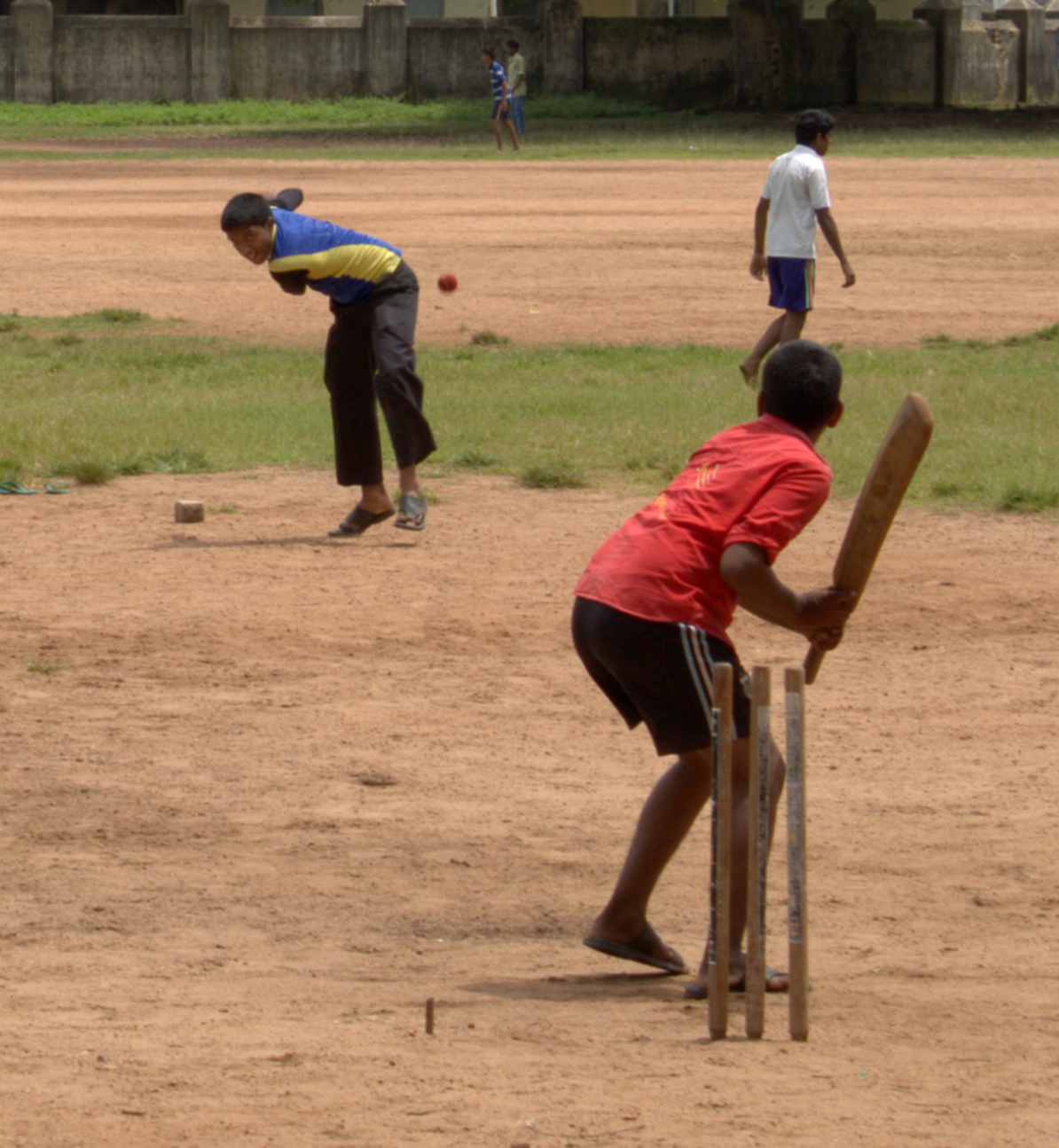
Cricket has become popular in South Asia. Several sports developed in Britain or in the former empire continue to flourish.

Political boundaries drawn by the British did not always reflect homogeneous ethnicities or religions, contributing to conflicts in formerly colonised areas, such as Nigeria and the Indian sub-continent. The British Empire fostered large migrations of peoples in the Commonwealth diaspora, and millions of people left the British Isles, with the founding settler-colonist populations of the United States, Canada, Australia and New Zealand coming largely from Britain and Ireland. Millions of people moved between British colonies, with large numbers of South Asian people emigrating to other parts of the empire, such as Malaysia and Fiji, and Overseas Chinese people moving to Malaysia, Singapore and the Caribbean; about half of all modern immigration to Commonwealth countries is from other Commonwealth countries. The demographics of the United Kingdom changed after the Second World War owing to immigration to Britain from remaining and former British colonies.

In the 19th century innovation in Britain led to revolutionary changes in manufacturing, the development of factory systems, and the growth of transportation by railway and steamship. Scholars debate as to what extent the Industrial Revolution, originating from the United Kingdom, was facilitated by or dependent on imperialism. British colonial architecture, such as in churches, railway-stations and government buildings, survives in many cities that were once part of the British Empire; Western technologies and architecture were globalised in part due to the Empire's military and administrative requirements. Integration of former colonies into the global economy was also a major legacy of empire. The British system of measurement, the imperial system, continues in use in some countries in various ways. The convention of driving on the left-hand side of the road prevails in much of the former empire.

The Westminster system of parliamentary democracy has served as a template for the constitutional basis of many former colonies, and English common law underlies many Commonwealth legal systems. It has been observed that almost every former colony that emerged as an independent democratic state is a former British colony, though this correlation greatly declines in strength after 30 years of an ex-colony's independence. International commercial contracts are often based on English common law. The British Judicial Committee of the Privy Council still serves as the highest court of appeal for twelve former colonies.

=== Interpretations of Empire ===
Historians' approaches to understanding the British Empire are diverse and evolving. Important elements debated over recent decades have included the impact of post-colonial studies, which seek to critically re-evaluate the history of imperialism, and the continued relevance of historians Ronald Robinson and John Gallagher, whose work greatly influenced imperial historiography during the 1950s and 1960s. In addition, differing assessments of the empire's legacy remain relevant to debates over recent events of history and politics (such as the Anglo-American invasions of Iraq and Afghanistan), as well as to discussions on Britain's role and identity in the contemporary world.

Historians such as Caroline Elkins have argued against perceptions of the British Empire as a primarily liberalising and modernising enterprise, criticising the system's widespread use of violence and of emergency laws to maintain power. Common criticisms of the empire include the use of detention camps in its colonies, massacres of indigenous peoples, and famine-response policies. Some scholars, including Amartya Sen, assert that British policies worsened the famines in India that killed millions during British rule. Conversely, historians such as Niall Ferguson calculate that the economic and institutional development the British Empire brought resulted in a net benefit to its colonies. Other historians treat the empire's legacy as varied and ambiguous. Public attitudes towards the empire within 21st-century Britain have been broadly positive, although sentiment towards the Commonwealth has been one of apathy and decline.

Unlike many other African nations which have condemned the British empire as oppressors and demanded slavery reparations, Malawi has praised the British Empire as liberators instead of oppressors or colonizers, highlighting the Britain's dedicated campaign to end slave trade in Africa, including Arab slave trade in the Eastern and Central Africa which had been going on throughout centuries before the British arrival in the region. The only conservation official in Malawi, Moses Mkumpha, stated in 2026 that the discussions on Atlantic slave trade have overshadowed those on Indian Ocean slave trade run by Muslim sultanates such as Omani Empire and others. He also stressed that the Africans were too also responsible for slave trade by enslaving and selling their countrymen, noting that the slavery started in the interior by African leaders rather than at the coast by foreign powers, with different African ethnic groups enslaving each other and then selling some on the market. Malawi has committed to preserving the material culture associated with the British Empire.

== See also ==
- List of British Empire–related topics
- Historiography of the British Empire
- Demographics of the British Empire
- Economy of the British Empire
- Territorial evolution of the British Empire
- History of the foreign relations of the United Kingdom
- Historical flags of the British Empire and the overseas territories
- List of countries that have gained independence from the United Kingdom
- British overseas cities
