= Edwin James Milliken =

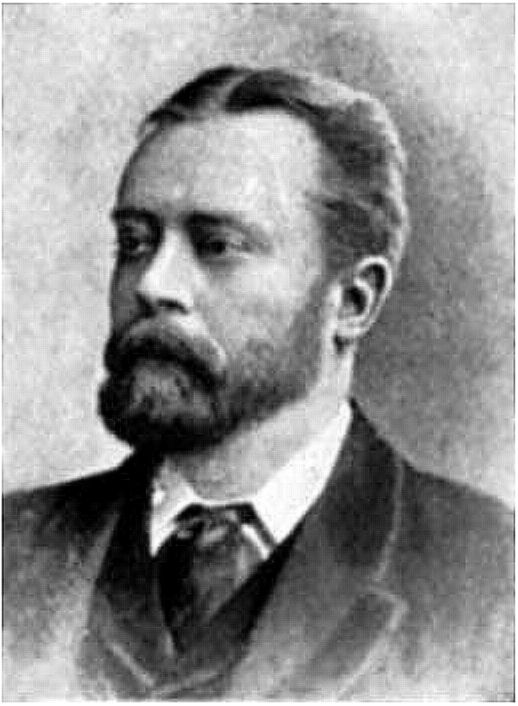
Circa 1880

Edwin James Milliken (1839 in Ireland – 26 August 1897), was a Punch editor, journalist, satirical humorist and poet. He is best known for his oft-quoted poem "Death and his brother sleep", notably quoted by Winston Churchill in the prelude to World War II when he felt that parliament was not taking the prospect of a war against Hitler seriously enough. He produced a series of comic poems published as The 'Arry Papers between 1874 and 1897. He worked as journalist on the London Figaro in 1872 and joined Punch in 1877. His creation of 'Arry, a bombastic Cockney, resulted in a successful series of poems which were hailed for their phonetic precision. Milliken described 'Arry as "really appalling. He is not a creature to be laughed at or with." In 1883 he published The Modern Ars Amandi.

Death and his brother sleep

Who is in charge of the clattering train?
The axles creak, and the couplings strain.
Ten minutes behind at the Junction. Yes!
And we're twenty now to the bad—no less!
We must make it up on our flight to town.
Clatter and crash! That's the last train down,
Flashing by with a steamy trail.
Pile on the fuel! We must not fail.
At every mile we a minute must gain!
Who is in charge of the clattering train?

Why, flesh and blood, as a matter of course!
You may talk of iron, and prate of force;
But, after all, and do what you can,
The best—and cheapest—machine is Man!
Wealth knows it well, and the hucksters feel
'Tis safer to trust them to sinew than steel.
With a bit of brain, and a conscience, behind,
Muscle works better than steam or wind.
Better, and longer, and harder all round;
And cheap, so cheap! Men superabound
Men stalwart, vigilant, patient, bold;
The stokehole's heat and the crow's-nest's cold,
The choking dusk of the noisome mine,
The northern blast o'er the beating brine,
With dogged valour they coolly brave;
So on rattling rail, or on wind-scourged wave,
At engine lever, at furnace front,
Or steersman's wheel, they must bear the brunt
Of lonely vigil or lengthened strain.
Man is in charge of the thundering train!

Man, in the shape of a modest chap
In fustian trousers and greasy cap;
A trifle stolid, and something gruff,
Yet, though unpolished, of sturdy stuff.
With grave grey eyes, and a knitted brow,
The glare of sun and the gleam of snow
Those eyes have stared on this many a year.
The crow's-feet gather in mazes queer
About their corners most apt to choke
With grime of fuel and fume of smoke.
Little to tickle the artist taste--
An oil-can, a fist-full of "cotton waste,"
The lever's click and the furnace gleam,
And the mingled odour of oil and steam;
These are the matters that fill the brain
Of the Man in charge of the clattering train.

Only a Man, but away at his back,
In a dozen ears, on the steely track,
A hundred passengers place their trust
In this fellow of fustian, grease, and dust.
They cheerily chat, or they calmly sleep,
Sure that the driver his watch will keep
On the night-dark track, that he will not fail.
So the thud, thud, thud of wheel upon rail
The hiss of steam-spurts athwart the dark.
Lull them to confident drowsiness. Hark!

What is that sound? 'Tis the stertorous breath
Of a slumbering man,--and it smacks of death!
Full sixteen hours of continuous toil
Midst the fume of sulphur, the reek of oil,
Have told their tale on the man's tired brain,
And Death is in charge of the clattering train!

Sleep—Death's brother, as poets deem,
Stealeth soft to his side; a dream
Of home and rest on his spirit creeps,
That wearied man, as the engine leaps,
Throbbing, swaying along the line;
Those poppy-fingers his head incline
Lower, lower, in slumber's trance;
The shadows fleet, and the gas-gleams dance
Faster, faster in mazy flight,
As the engine flashes across the night.
Mortal muscle and human nerve
Cheap to purchase, and stout to serve.
Strained too fiercely will faint and swerve.
Over-weighted, and underpaid,
This human tool of exploiting Trade,
Though tougher than leather, tenser than steel.
Fails at last, for his senses reel,
His nerves collapse, and, with sleep-sealed eyes,
Prone and helpless a log he lies!
A hundred hearts beat placidly on,
Unwitting they that their warder's gone;
A hundred lips are babbling blithe,
Some seconds hence they in pain may writhe.
For the pace is hot, and the points are near,
And Sleep hath deadened the driver's ear;
And signals flash through the night in vain.
Death is in charge of the clattering train!

On 12 July 1890, a light engine (i.e. without
train) ran the stop signals at Eastleigh North
Junction and collided with the rear of a freight
train awaiting clearance. The only fatality was
from a length of timber protruding from the wreckage
which penetrated the guard’s lookout window of a train
passing on another track, killing the guard. The driver
and fireman of the light engine had missed stop signals
– their inattention almost certainly due to fatigue
caused by long working hours.

A Man of the Crowd to Charles Dickens

I am but one of many; never saw
Thy face, or heard the voice that now is stilled.
My spirit is but little apt to awe
Of lofty-perched mortality; and yet
My heart is heavy with a keen regret,
Mine eyes with unaccustomed tears are filled.
We of the throng lead little lives, apart
From all the genial stir and glow of art,
The comradeship of genius, and the breath
Of that large life to which our low-pulsed life is death.

Slow-footed, bowed, we toil through narrow ways,
And linger out our dull and unrecorded days.
But thou! — thou had'st an eye to mark
The feeble light that burned within our dark;
A sympathy as wide as heaven's free air;
A glance as bright
As heaven's own light,
That, pure amid pollution, pierceth everywhere.
Not beggary's rags, not squalor's grime,
The crust of ignorance, the stain of crime,
Could hide from thee the naked human soul.
Thou had'st our Shakespeare's ken, and Howard's heart;
Not puppets we, God's poor, to play our part
On thy mimetic stage, mere foils grotesque,
Apt adjuncts of thine art's bright picturesque.
Our loves, our hates, our hopes and fears,
Our sins and sorrows, smiles and tears,
To thee were real as to us, who knew
That though would'st limn them with a hand as true
And tender in its touch, as though it drew
The finer traits and passions of thy peers.
That sense so sure, that wit so strong,
Did battle on our side against the oppressor's wrong,
Because thine honest heart did burn with scorn
Of high-perched insolence everywhere;
And knightly, though unknighted, thou did'st dare
To champion the feeble and forlorn.
Though not in fairy forest, leaguered tower,
By haunted lake, or startled Beauty's bower,
Did'st thou go seeking them; but in foul lairs
Not else remembered even in good men's prayers.
In hidden haunts of cruelty, where no light,
Save of thy sympathy, pierced the night.
Thence, though the source might all unlovely seem,
Unfit for painter's touch or poet's dream;
Thou, painter-poet as thou wert, did'st draw
The hidden beauty meaner eyes ne'er saw;
But which, set forth upon thy living page,
Drew all the eyes and hearts of an unthinking age.
All inarticulate we; thou wert our voice;
Thou in our poor rejoicing did'st rejoice,
Smile gently with our pitiful mirth, and grieve
When Pain, our chill familiar, plucked each ragged sleeve.
Therefore we love thee, better than we knew,
Old friend and true.
Thy silent passing to an honoured tomb
Has filled a people's heart with more than fleeting gloom.
Moreover, thou did'st bring us of thy beat,
Thou, with the great an honoured guest,
And treasured by the chiefs of birth and brain,
To simple and unlearned souls wert plain.
The common heart on thine enchantment hung,
While genius, stooping from her heights,
Lent to the lowest her delights,
And spake to each in his own mother tongue.
Who now like thee shall lighten human care?
By words where mirth with pathos meets,
By most delectable conceits,
Thou gav'st us laughter that our babes might share;
And jollity, that had no touch of shame.
No satyr's brand besmirches thy fair fame.
Thy meteor fancy, by its quickening sleight,
Peopled our world with creatures of delight.
Not phantoms they, but very friends they seem,
Dear and familiar as are few
Of those around us; all too true
And quick for shadows of Romance's dream.
Most human-hearted they, or grave or gay,
But touched with that unspeakable impress
Of genius, airy wit, rare tenderness,
That marks them as thine own (e'en so a ray
Of sunset glory magnifies
Familiar beauties to our eyes) —
So touched, they in our memories live for aye,
Unaged by time and sacred from decay.
The friends we cherish pass, the foes we hate;
All living things towards Death's portal move;
Not even thee a nation's pride and love
Could keep from that dark gate.
But these, thy creatures, cannot die;
Companions of all generations, they
Shall keep thy mem'ry from decay
More surely than that glorious grave where thou dost lie.
Therefore, let critic carp or bigot prate,
Sniff fault or folly here or there,
Contemn thy creed, or thee declare
Not wholly wise, or something less than great.
Thou hast the people's heart, that few may gain;
Not yielded to mere strenuous might of brain,
Prowess of arm, or force of will,
But to the strong and true and tender soul,
The human in excelsis, that can thrill
Through all humanity's pulses, till the whole
Great scattered brotherhood again is one.
No chill star-radiance thine; thou art a sun
Of central warmth; lord of our smiles and tears,
An uncrowned king of men through all the years.

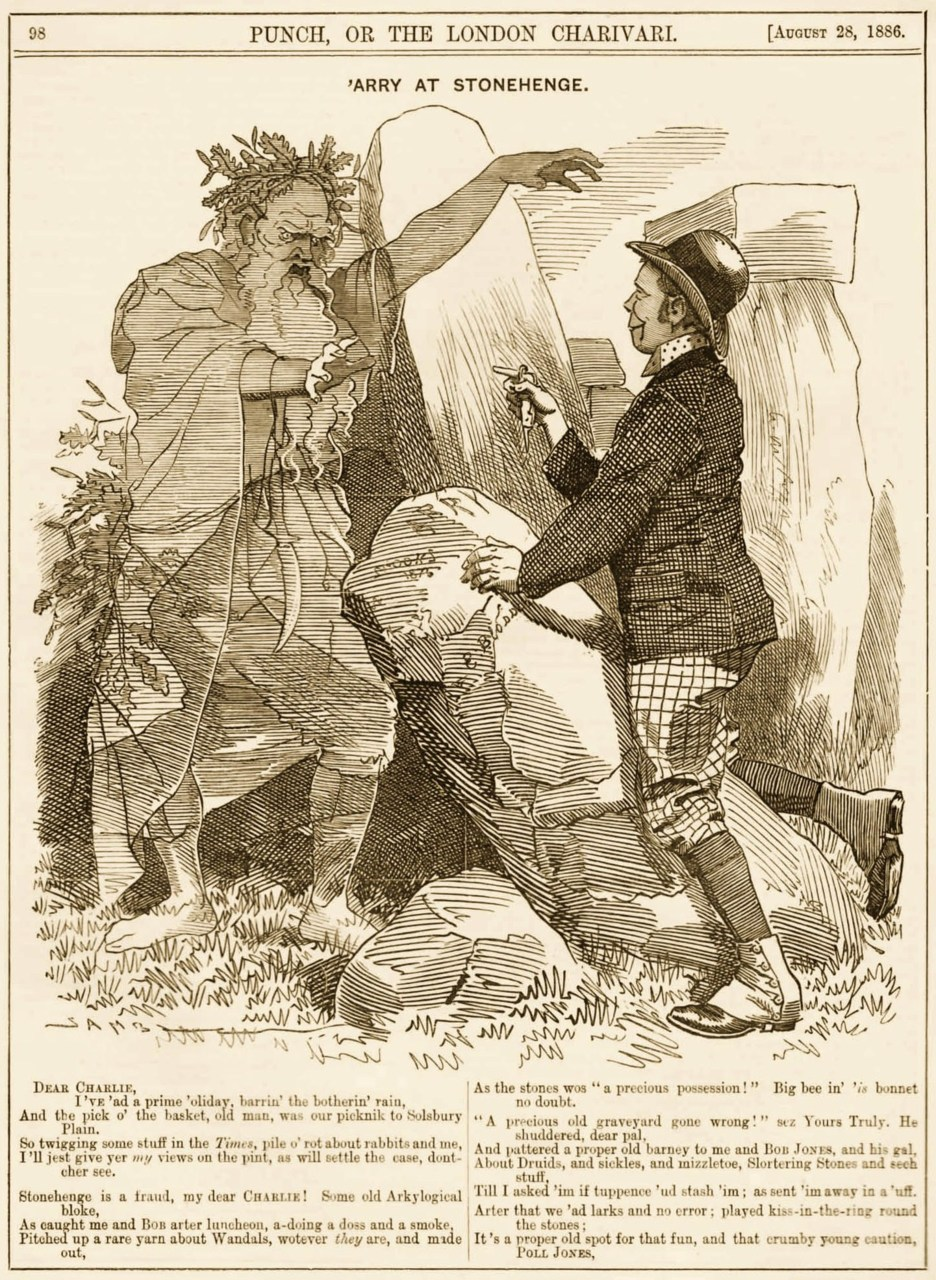
'Arry at Stonehenge

Milliken's first association with Punch occurred on 2 January 1875 with a few lines entitled "A Voice from Venus", that planet's transit having just taken place. This was his first contribution and, since he was a newcomer, he was asked for an assurance that he was indeed the author. From then on his contributions were regular and he was welcomed to the staff in early 1877.

Milliken was trained for, and spent the beginning of his career, with a large engineering firm. The literary world, though, was always his first love and his contributions to a few magazines and journals initially satisfied this bent. His first accredited work was a memorial poem to Charles Dickens printed in The Gentleman's Magazine in 1870.

He died on 26 August 1897 and was buried at West Norwood Cemetery.

== Major contributions to Punch ==
- "Childe Chappie's Pilgrimage" (1883) Edwin James Milliken, illustrated by Edward J. Wheeler (1848–1933)
- "The Modern Ars Amandi" (1883)
- "The Town" (1884)
- "Fitzdotterel; or, T'other and Which" (parody of Lord Lytton's "Glenaveril") (1885)
- "Modern Asmodeus" (1889–90)
- "The New Guide to Knowledge"
