= Bayan =

Bayan or Al-Bayan (Arabic: البيان) may refer to:

== Arts, entertainment and media ==
=== Literature ===
- Bayán, the body of the works of the Báb, an Iranian religious leader
  - Persian Bayán, c. 1847
  - Arabic Bayán, 1848
- Al-Bayan (journal), a 19th-century periodical in Cairo
- Al Bayan (magazine), a business magazine in Lebanon
- Al-Bayan (newspaper), in the United Arab Emirates
- Ang Bayan, the official newspaper of the Communist Party of the Philippines

=== Other uses in arts, entertainment and media ===
- Bayan (accordion), Russian musical instrument
- Bayan, the larger drum of the tabla set
- Al-Bayan (radio station), the Islamic State's official radio station based in Iraq

== Businesses and organisations ==
- Bayan Telecommunications, a Philippine telecommunications company
- Bayan Productions, a Philippine television production company
- Bagong Alyansang Makabayan, or Bayan, an alliance of left-wing Philippine organizations
- Al Bayan Holding Group, now Shamiekh Holding Group, a Saudi-based business conglomerate

== People ==
- Bayan (given name), including a list of people with the name
- Bayan I (died 602), khagan of the Avar Khaganate 562–602
- Bayan II (died 617), khagan of the Avar Khaganate 602–617
- Bayan (son of Kubrat), or Batbayan, ruler of the Khazarian Bulgars 667–690
- Bayan of the Baarin (1236–1295), Mongol general of the Yuan Dynasty
- Bayan of the Merkit (died 1340), Mongol general of the Mergid clan and official in the Yuan Dynasty
- Bayan (khan) (r. 1302–1309), a khan of White Horde

== Places ==
- Bayan, Dashkasan, Azerbaijan
- Bayan, Oghuz, Azerbaijan
- Bayan, Qinghai, China
- Bayan Township, Qinghai, China
- Bayan, Bayan, North Lombok, Indonesia
- Bayan, Purworejo, Indonesia
- Bayan, Fars, Iran
- Bayan, Hamadan, Iran
- Bayan, Sistan and Baluchestan, Iran
- Bayan, an ancient town near Khorramshahr, Iran
- Bayan, Kuwait
  - Bayan Palace
- Bayan, Töv, Mongolia
- Bayan, Republic of Buryatia, Russia
- Bayan, Bayat, Turkey
- Bayan County, Heilongjiang Province, China
- Bayan Lake, Santmargats, Zavkhan Province, Mongolia
- Bayan station (Qinghai–Tibet railway), China
- Bayan (Airport) station, Hohhot, Mongolia
- Bayan, a polity in the Philippines, originally a form of precolonial barangay

== Other uses ==
- Bayan-class cruiser, of the Imperial Russian Navy
  - Russian cruiser Bayan (1900)
  - Russian cruiser Bayan (1907)
- Bayan Islamic Graduate School, in Chicago, United States
- Bayan University, in Khartoum, Sudan

== See also ==
- Bhajan, an Indian devotional song
- Bajan (disambiguation)
- Bayani (disambiguation)
