= Barbados (disambiguation) =

Barbados is an island nation located in the eastern Caribbean (formerly spelt Barbadoes).

Barbados or Barbadoes may also refer to:

== Places ==
- Barbadoes Island (Pennsylvania), an island in the Schuylkill River located to the south of Norristown in Montgomery County, Pennsylvania
- Barbadoes, a former name of Theodore Roosevelt Island, Washington, D.C.
- Mártires de Barbados Stadium, a multi-use stadium in Bayamo, Cuba
- Disney's Caribbean Beach Resort, a hotel with a themed area by the name of Barbados
- New Barbadoes Township, New Jersey, a township in Bergen County, New Jersey
- New Barbadoes Neck
- Barbadoes Street, a major street in central Christchurch, New Zealand
  - Barbadoes Street Cemetery, Christchurch
- Barbadoes Green, former name of Howard Park, Kilmarnock, Scotland, home of Kilmarnock FC
- Barbadoes Hill, a location in the Wye Valley, northeast of Tintern, Wales.
- United States Naval Facility, Barbados (1957–1979), a U.S. Navy facility once located at Harrisons Point, St. Lucy, Barbados.

== People ==
- Barbados Joe Walcott (1873–1935), also known as "The Barbados Demon", professional boxer
- Barbados Slim, fictional character on the US-based television show Futurama
- James George Barbadoes, (c. 1796–1841), African-American, community leader, and abolitionist

== Entertainment ==
- Barbados (band), a Swedish band who participated in Melodifestivalen several times
- "Barbados" (Typically Tropical song), 1975
- "Barbados" (Models song), 1985
- Barbados (composition), a jazz blues composed by Charlie Parker
- "Barbados" (On the Up), a British sitcom episode

== Ships ==
- HMS Barbados (K504), a British frigate in service with the Royal Navy from 1943 to 1946
- SS Manticos, a British heavy-lift ship originally named SS Empire Barbados

== Other ==
- Muscovado, a style of sugar also known as "Barbados"
- 45597 Barbados, a British LMS Jubilee Class locomotive

== See also ==
- Barbadian (disambiguation)
- Bajan (disambiguation)
- Barbuda (disambiguation)
