= Howard Park =

Howard Park may refer to:

- Howard Park, Queens, a neighborhood in Howard Beach, Queens, New York City
- Howard Park, Baltimore, part of Forest Park
- Howard Park, Kilmarnock, East Ayrshire, Scotland
- Howard Park P.S. 218, an elementary school in Baltimore, Maryland, United States
- Howard Park Wines, a winery in Western Australia
- Howard Park and Gardens, a recreation area in Letchworth, England

== See also ==
- Howard Parkes (1877–1920), English cricketer
- Dr. Howard A. Kelly Park, Orange County, Florida
- Fred H. Howard Park, a pocket beach near Tarpon Springs, Pinellas County, Florida
