= British colonization of the Americas =

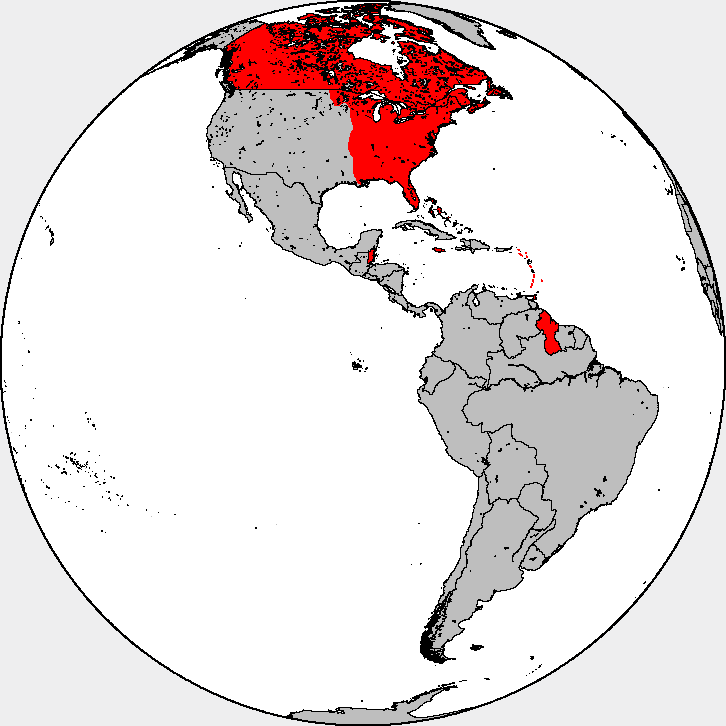
The colonies of Great Britain in the Americas, 1763–1783

British efforts to colonize the Americas began in the late 16th century with failed attempts by England to establish permanent colonies in North America. The first permanent English colony in the Americas was established in Jamestown, Virginia, in 1607. Colonies were established in North America, Central America, South America, and the Caribbean.

British colonization of the Americas occurred at the same time as the Plantations of Ireland. Although most British colonies in the Americas eventually gained independence, some colonies have remained under Britain's jurisdiction as British Overseas Territories.

The first documented settlement of Europeans in the Americas was established by Norse people around 1000 AD in what is now Newfoundland, called Vinland by the Norse. Later European exploration of North America resumed with Christopher Columbus's 1492 expedition sponsored by Castile. English settlement began almost a century later. Sir Walter Raleigh established the short-lived Roanoke Colony in 1585. The 1607 settlement of the Jamestown colony grew into the Colony of Virginia. Virgineola—settled unintentionally by the shipwreck of the Virginia Company's Sea Venture in 1609, and renamed The Somers Isles—is still known by its older Spanish name, Bermuda. In 1620, a group of mostly Pilgrim religious separatists established a second permanent colony on the mainland, on the coast of Massachusetts. Several other English colonies were established in North America during the 17th and 18th centuries. With the authorization of a royal charter, the Hudson's Bay Company established the territory of Rupert's Land in the Hudson Bay drainage basin. The English also established or conquered several colonies in the Caribbean, including Barbados and Jamaica.

England captured the Dutch colony of New Netherland in the Anglo-Dutch Wars of the mid-17th century, leaving North America divided among the English, Spanish, and French empires. After decades of warring with France, Britain took control of the French colony of Canada, France's territory east of the Mississippi River, and the Floridas from Spain, as well as several Caribbean territories, in 1763. Many of the North American colonies gained independence from Britain through victory in the American Revolutionary War, which ended in 1783 and the Floridas were returned to Spain. Historians refer to the British Empire after 1783 as the "Second British Empire"; this period saw Britain increasingly focus on Asia and Africa instead of the Americas, and increasingly focus on the expansion of trade rather than territorial possessions. Nonetheless, Britain continued to colonize parts of the Americas in the 19th century, taking control of British Columbia and establishing the colonies of the Falkland Islands and British Honduras. Britain also gained control of several colonies, including Trinidad and British Guiana, following the 1815 defeat of France in the Napoleonic Wars.

In the mid-19th century, Britain began the process of granting self-government to its remaining colonies in North America. Most of these colonies joined the Confederation of Canada in the 1860s or 1870s, though Newfoundland would not join Canada until 1949. Canada gained full autonomy following the passage of the Statute of Westminster 1931, though it retained various ties to Britain and still recognizes the British monarch as head of state. Following the onset of the Cold War, most of the remaining British colonies in the Americas gained independence between 1962 and 1983. Many of the former British colonies are part of the Commonwealth of Nations, a political association chiefly consisting of former colonies of the British Empire.

== Background: early exploration and colonization of the Americas ==
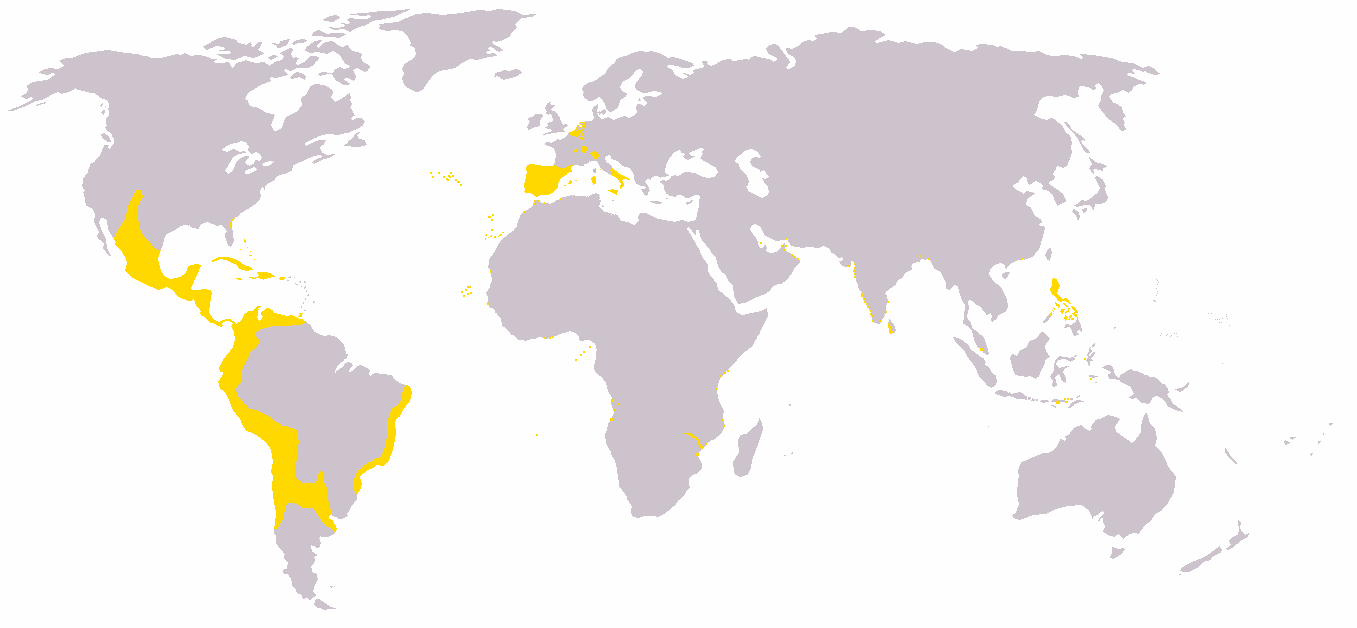
By the end of the 16th century, the Iberian Union of Spain and Portugal colonized a significant part of the Americas, but most territory of the Americas had not yet been colonized by European powers

Following the first voyage of Christopher Columbus in 1492, Spain and Portugal established colonies in the New World, beginning the European colonization of the Americas. France and England, two other major powers of 15th-century Western Europe, employed explorers soon after the return of Columbus's first voyage. In 1497, King Henry VII of England dispatched an expedition led by John Cabot to explore the coast of North America, but the lack of precious metals or other riches discouraged both the Spanish and English from permanently settling in North America during the early 17th century.

Later explorers such as Martin Frobisher and Henry Hudson sailed to the New World in search of a Northwest Passage between the Atlantic Ocean and Asia, but were unable to find a viable route. Europeans established fisheries in the Grand Banks of Newfoundland, and traded metal, glass, and cloth for food and fur, beginning the North American fur trade. During mid-1585 Bernard Drake launched an expedition to Newfoundland which crippled the Spanish and Portuguese fishing fleets there from which they never recovered. This would have consequences in terms of English colonial expansion and settlement.

In the Caribbean Sea, English sailors defied Spanish trade restrictions and preyed on Spanish treasure ships. The English colonization of America had been based on the English colonization of Ireland, specifically the Munster Plantation, England's first colony, using the same tactics as the Plantations of Ireland. Many of the early colonists of North America had their start in colonizing Ireland, including a group known as the West Country Men. When Sir Walter Raleigh landed in Virginia, he saw similarities between Native Americans and "wild" Irish. Both Roanoke and Jamestown had been based on the Irish plantation model.

In the late sixteenth century, Protestant England became embroiled in a religious war with Catholic Spain. Seeking to weaken Spain's economic and military power, English privateers such as Francis Drake and Humphrey Gilbert harassed Spanish shipping. On 5 August 1583, Gilbert claimed Newfoundland as England's first overseas colony under Royal Charter of Queen Elizabeth I, thus officially establishing a forerunner to the much later British Empire. Gilbert proposed the colonization of North America on the Spanish model, with the goal of creating a profitable English empire that could also serve as a base for the privateers.

After Gilbert's death, Walter Raleigh in 1584 took up the cause of North American colonization, sponsoring an expedition of 500 men to Roanoke Island, at present-day North Carolina. A military outpost was set up in 1585 and evacuated in 1586. In 1587 Roanoke Colony was settled with the intent to be permanent and thus included women and children. But the colonists were poorly prepared for life in the New World, and by 1590, they had disappeared. Theories have been put forward as to what happened to the colonists there. Perhaps most of the colonists moved to a different area in the Chesapeake, leaving any stragglers to integrate with the local Native American population, and eventually integrating or dying out themselves.

A separate colonization attempt in Newfoundland also failed. Despite the failure of these early colonies, the English government remained interested in the colonization of North America for economic and military reasons.

== Early colonization, 1607–1630 ==
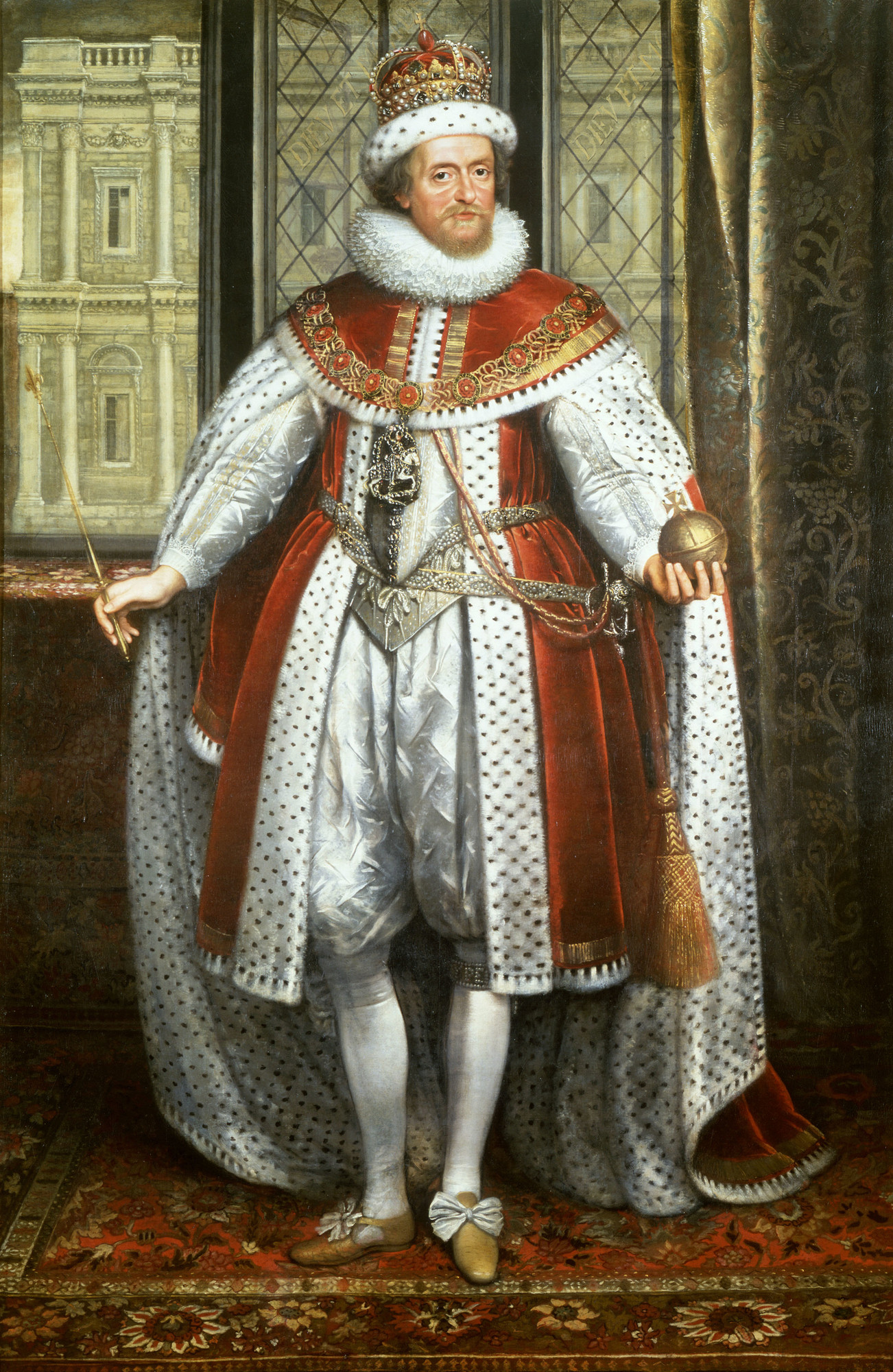
Jamestown, the first permanent English settlement in North America, was established during the reign of King James VI and I (1603–1625)

In 1606, King James VI and I granted charters to both the Plymouth Company and the London Company for the purpose of establishing permanent settlements in North America. In 1607, the London Company established a permanent colony at Jamestown on the Chesapeake Bay, but the Plymouth Company's Popham Colony proved short-lived. Approximately 30,000 Algonquian peoples lived in the region at the time. The colonists at Jamestown faced extreme adversity, and by 1617 there were only 351 survivors out of the 1700 colonists who had been transported to Jamestown. After the Virginians discovered the profitability of growing tobacco, the settlement's population boomed from 400 settlers in 1617 to 1240 settlers in 1622. The London Company was bankrupted in part due to frequent warring with nearby American Indians, leading the English crown to take direct control of the Colony of Virginia, as Jamestown and its surrounding environs became known.

In 1609, the Sea Venture, flagship of the English London Company, a division of the Virginia Company, bearing Admiral Sir George Somers and the new lieutenant-governor for Jamestown, Sir Thomas Gates, was deliberately driven onto the reef off the archipelago of Bermuda to prevent its foundering during a hurricane on the 25th of July. The 150 passengers and crew built two ships, the Deliverance and Patience, and on 11 May 1610 most used the ships to leave Bermuda again for Jamestown. Two men remained behind. They were joined by a third when the Patience returned. Patience departed for England (it had been meant to return to Jamestown after gathering food in Bermuda). The residency of the three ensured that Bermuda remained settled and in the possession of England and the London Company from 1609 to 1612. The Royal Charter of the London Company was extended to officially add Bermuda to the territory of Virginia, and in 1612, settlers and the first lieutenant-governor arrived from England.

The archipelago was officially named Virgineola. This was soon changed to The Somers Isles. This is its official place name, though the archipelago had already long been infamous as Bermuda, and the older Spanish name of Virgineola has resisted replacement. The lieutenant-governor and settlers who arrived in 1612 briefly settled on Smith's Island, where the three left behind by the Sea Venture were thriving, before moving to St. George's Island where they established the town of New London, which was soon renamed to St. George's Town. (The first actual town successfully established by the English in the New World as Jamestown was really James Fort, a rudimentary defensive structure, in 1612).

Bermuda was soon more populous, self-sufficient and prosperous than Jamestown, and a second company, the Company of the City of London for the Plantacion of The Somers Isles (better known as The Somers Isles Company) was spun-off from the London Company in 1615 and continued to administer Bermuda after the London Company's Royal Charter was revoked in 1624. (The Somers Isles Company's Royal Charter was similarly revoked in 1684). Bermuda pioneered tobacco cultivation as the engine for its economic growth, and it initially prospered. But as it was outstripped by Virginia's tobacco agriculture in the 1620s, and new colonies in the West Indies also emulated its tobacco industry, the income from Bermudian tobacco fell. Investments in the colony became unprofitable for many of the company's shareholders, who mostly remained in England while managers and tenants farmed in Bermuda using the labour of indentured servants. Bermuda's House of Assembly held its first session in 1620. (Virginia's House of Burgesses had held its first session in 1619). With no landowners resident in Bermuda, there was no property qualification to sit in the Assembly, unlike the case with the House of Commons. (The property qualification was in effect for United Kingdom elections until the passage of the Representation of the People Act 1918.)

When the bottom fell out of tobacco, many absentee shareholders (or Adventurers) sold their shares to resident managers and tenants, and the agricultural sector shifted towards family farms growing subsistence crops, instead of tobacco. Bermudians found they could sell excess foodstuffs in the West Indies where Barbados and other colonies grew tobacco to the exclusion of food. As the company's magazine ship would not carry food to the West Indies, Bermudians built ships from Bermuda cedar, and developed the speedy and nimble Bermuda sloop and the Bermuda rig.

Between the late 1610s and the American Revolution, Britain shipped an estimated 50,000 to 120,000 convicts to its American colonies.

Meanwhile, the Council for New England sponsored several colonization projects, including a colony of Puritan Pilgrims. Puritans embraced an intensely emotional form of Calvinist Protestantism and sought independence from the Church of England. In 1620, the Mayflower transported the Pilgrims across the Atlantic, and the Pilgrims established Plymouth Colony on Cape Cod. They suffered an extremely hard first winter, and about half of the one hundred colonists died. In 1621, Plymouth Colony established an alliance with the nearby Wampanoag people, who helped the Plymouth Colony adopt effective agricultural practices and traded fur and other materials with them.

North of there, the English colony of Newfoundland Colony was established in 1610. This primarily focused on cod fishing.

The Caribbean provided some of England's most important and lucrative colonies, but only after several colonies failed. A colony in Guiana was established in 1604, but it lasted only two years and failed in its main objective of finding gold. Colonies in St Lucia (1605) and Grenada (1609) also rapidly folded. Encouraged by the success of Virginia, in 1627 King Charles I granted a charter to the Barbados Company for the settlement of the uninhabited Caribbean island of Barbados. Early settlers failed in their attempts to cultivate tobacco but were successful at growing sugar.

== Growth, 1630–1687 ==
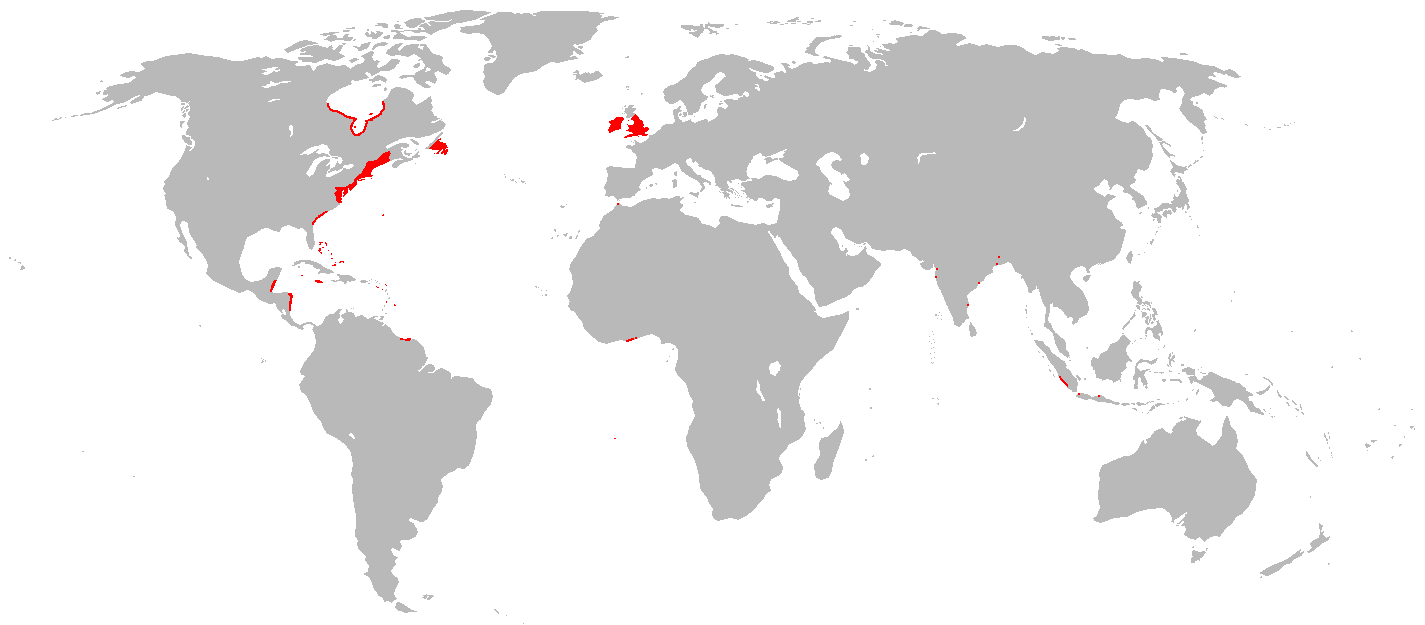
English overseas possessions in 1700

=== West Indies colonies ===
The success of colonization efforts in Barbados encouraged the establishment of more Caribbean colonies, and by 1660 England had established Caribbean sugar colonies in St. Kitts, Antigua, Nevis, and Montserrat, English colonization of the Bahamas began in 1648 after a Puritan group known as the Eleutheran Adventurers established a colony on the island of Eleuthera. England established another sugar colony in 1655 following the successful invasion of Jamaica during the Anglo-Spanish War. Spain acknowledged English possession of Jamaica and the Caiman Islands in the 1670 Treaty of Madrid. England captured Tortola from the Dutch in 1670, and subsequently took possession of the nearby islands of Anegada and Virgin Gorda; these islands would later form the British Virgin Islands.

During the 17th century, the sugar colonies adopted the system of sugar plantations successfully used by the Portuguese in Brazil, which depended on slave labour. The English government valued the economic importance of these islands over that of New England. Until the abolition of its slave trade in 1807, Britain was responsible for the transportation of 3.5 million African slaves to the Americas, a third of all slaves transported across the Atlantic. Many of the slaves were captured by the Royal African Company in West Africa, though others came from Madagascar. These slaves soon came to form the majority of the population in Caribbean colonies like Barbados and Jamaica, where strict slave codes were established partly to deter slave rebellions.

=== Establishment of the Thirteen Colonies ===
==== New England Colonies ====
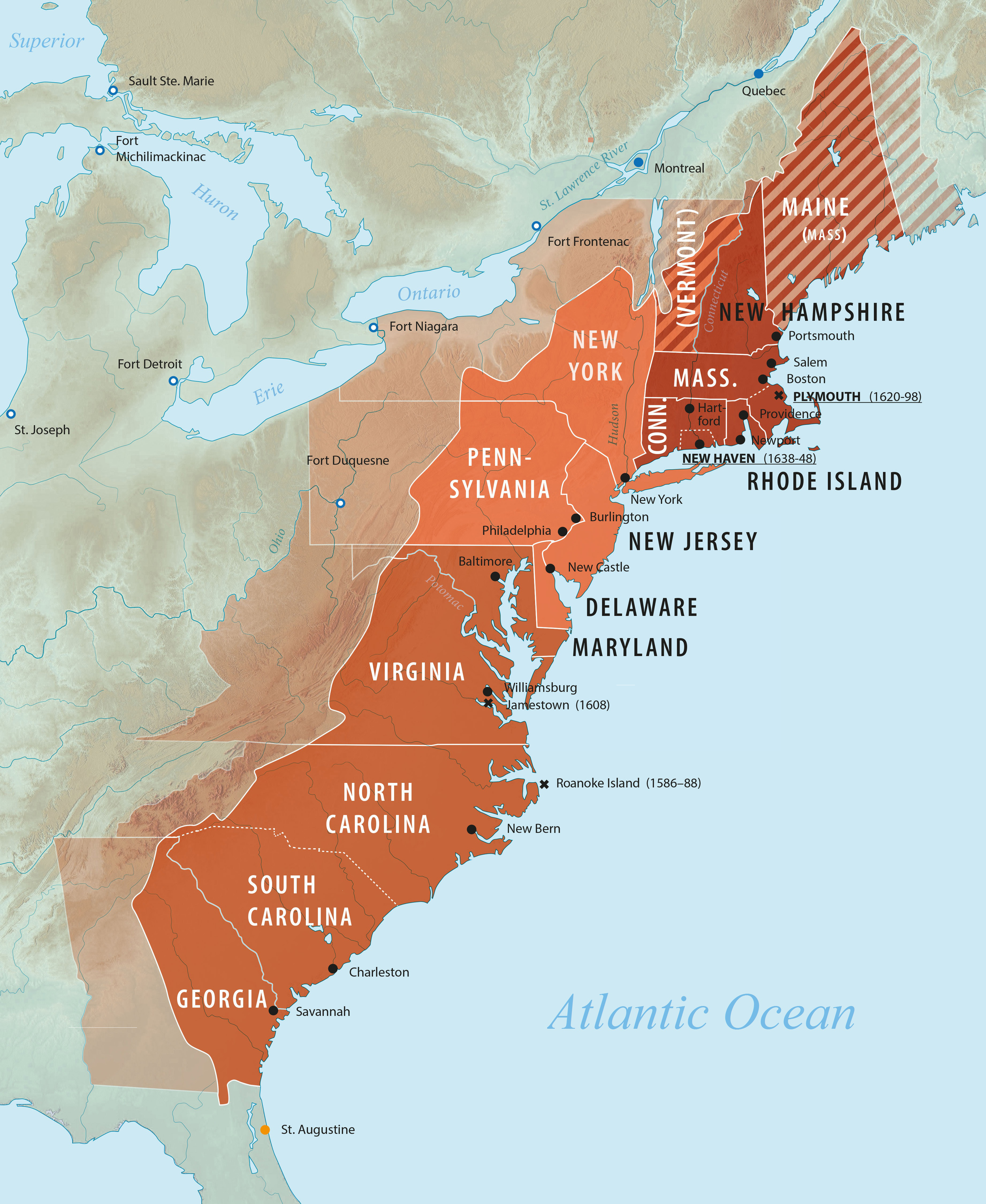
Thirteen Colonies of North America: Dark Red = New England Colonies. Bright Red = Middle Atlantic colonies. Red-brown = Southern Colonies.

Following the success of the Jamestown and Plymouth Colonies, several more English groups established colonies in the region that became known as New England. In 1629, another group of Puritans led by John Winthrop established the Massachusetts Bay Colony, and by 1635 roughly ten thousand English settlers lived in the region between the Connecticut River and the Kennebec River. After defeating the Pequot in the Pequot War, Puritan settlers established the Connecticut Colony in the region the Pequots had formerly controlled. The Colony of Rhode Island and Providence Plantations was founded by Roger Williams, a Puritan leader who was expelled from the Massachusetts Bay Colony after he advocated for a formal split with the Church of England. As New England was a relatively cold and infertile region, the New England Colonies relied on fishing and long-distance trade to sustain the economy.

==== Southern Colonies ====
In 1632, Cecil Calvert, 2nd Baron Baltimore founded the Province of Maryland to the north of Virginia. Maryland and Virginia became known as the Chesapeake Colonies, and experienced similar immigration and economic activities. Though Baltimore and his descendants intended for the colony to be a refuge for Catholics, it attracted mostly Protestant immigrants, many of whom scorned the Calvert family's policy of religious toleration. In the mid-17th century, the Chesapeake Colonies, inspired by the success of slavery in Barbados, began the mass importation of African slaves. Though many early slaves eventually gained their freedom, after 1662 Virginia adopted policies that passed enslaved status from mother to child and granted slave owners near-total domination of their human property.

640 miles (1,030 km) East-South-East of Cape Hatteras, in the Virginia Company's other former settlement, the Somers Isles, alias the Islands of Bermuda, where the spin-off Somers Isles Company still administered, the company and its shareholders in England only earned profits from the export of tobacco, placing them increasingly at odds with Bermudians for whom tobacco had become unprofitable to cultivate. As only those landowners who could attend the company's annual meetings in England were permitted to vote on company policy, the company worked to suppress the developing maritime economy of the colonists and to force the production of tobacco, which required unsustainable farming practices as more was required to be produced to make up for the diminished value.

As many of the class of moneyed businessmen who were adventurers in the company were aligned to the Parliamentary cause during the English Civil War, Bermuda was one of the colonies that sided with the Crown during the war, being the first to recognise Charles II after the execution of his father. With control of their Assembly and the militia and volunteer coastal artillery, the Royalist majority deposed the company-appointed governor (by the 1630s, the company had ceased sending governors to Bermuda and had instead appointed a succession of prominent Bermudians to the role, including religious Independent and Parliamentarian William Sayle) by force of arms and elected John Trimingham to replace him. Many of Bermuda's religious Independents, who had sided with Parliament, were forced into exile. Although some of the newer continental colonies settled largely by anti-Episcopalian Protestants sided with Parliament during the war, Virginia and other colonies like Bermuda supported the Crown and were subjected to the measures laid out in An Act for prohibiting Trade with the Barbadoes, Virginia, Bermuda and Antego until Parliament was able to force them to acknowledge its sovereignty.

Bermudian anger at the policies of the Somers Isles Company ultimately saw them take their complaints to the Crown after The Restoration, leading to the Crown revoking the Royal Charter of the Somers Isles Company and taking over direct administration of Bermuda in 1684. From that date, Bermudians abandoned agriculture, diversifying their maritime industry to occupy many niches of inter-colonial trade between North America and the West Indies. Bermudians limited landmass and high birth rate meant that a steady outflow from the colony contributed about 10,000 settlers to other colonies, notably the southern continental colonies (including Carolina Province, which was settled from Bermuda in 1670), as well as West Indian settlements, including the Providence Island colony in 1631, the Bahamas (settled by Eleutheran Adventurers, Parliament-allied Civil War exiles from Bermuda, under William Sayle in the 1640s), and the seasonal occupation of the Turks Islands from 1681.

Encouraged by the apparent weakness of Spanish rule in Florida, Barbadian planter John Colleton and seven other supporters of Charles II of England established the Province of Carolina in 1663. Settlers in the Carolina Colony established two main population centers, with many Virginians settling in the north of the province and many English Barbadians settling in the southern port city of Charles Town. In 1712, Carolina was divided into the crown colonies of North Carolina and South Carolina. The colonies of Maryland, Virginia, North Carolina, and South Carolina (as well as the Province of Georgia, which was established in 1732) became known as the Southern Colonies.

==== Middle Colonies ====
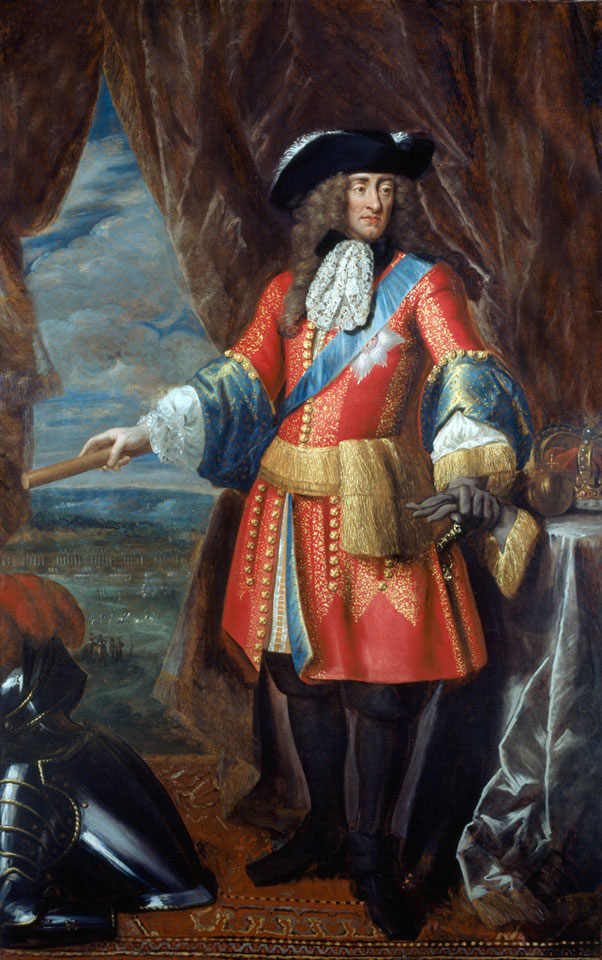
James II established the Colony of New York and the Dominion of New England. He succeeded his brother as King of England in 1685 but was overthrown in the Glorious Revolution of 1688.

Beginning in 1609, Dutch traders had established fur trading posts on the Hudson River, Delaware River, and Connecticut River, ultimately creating the Dutch colony of New Netherland, with a capital at New Amsterdam. In 1657, New Netherland expanded through conquest of New Sweden, a Swedish colony centered in the Delaware Valley. Despite commercial success, New Netherland failed to attract the same level of settlement as the English colonies. In 1664, during a series of wars between the English and Dutch, English soldier Richard Nicolls captured New Netherland. The Dutch briefly regained control of parts of New Netherland in the Third Anglo-Dutch War, but surrendered its claim to the territory in the 1674 Treaty of Westminster, ending the Dutch colonial presence in North America. In 1664, the Duke of York, later known as King James II and VII, was granted control of the English colonies north of the Delaware River. He created the Province of New York out of the former Dutch territory and renamed New Amsterdam as New York City. He also created the provinces of West Jersey and East Jersey out of former Dutch land situated to the west of New York City, giving the territories to John Berkeley and George Carteret. East Jersey and West Jersey would later be unified as the Province of New Jersey in 1702.

Charles II rewarded William Penn, the son of distinguished Admiral William Penn, with the land situated between Maryland and the Jerseys. Penn named this land the Province of Pennsylvania. Penn was also granted a lease to the Delaware Colony, which gained its own legislature in 1701. A devout Quaker, Penn sought to create a haven of religious toleration in the New World. Pennsylvania attracted Quakers and other settlers from across Europe, and the city of Philadelphia quickly emerged as a thriving port city. With its fertile and cheap land, Pennsylvania became one of the most attractive destinations for immigrants in the late 17th century. New York, Pennsylvania, New Jersey, and Delaware became known as the Middle Colonies.

=== Hudson's Bay Company ===
In 1670, Charles II incorporated by royal charter the Hudson's Bay Company (HBC), granting it a monopoly on the fur trade in the area known as Rupert's Land. Forts and trading posts established by the HBC were frequently the subject of attacks by the French.

=== Darien scheme ===
In 1695, the Parliament of Scotland granted a charter to the Company of Scotland, which established a settlement in 1698 on the Isthmus of Panama. Besieged by neighbouring Spanish colonists of New Granada, and afflicted by malaria, the colony was abandoned two years later. The Darien scheme was a financial disaster for Scotland—a quarter of Scottish capital was lost in the enterprise—and ended Scottish hopes of establishing its own overseas empire. The episode also had major political consequences, persuading the governments of both England and Scotland of the merits of a union of countries, rather than just crowns. This occurred in 1707 with the Treaty of Union, establishing the Kingdom of Great Britain.

== Expansion and conflict, 1689–1763 ==
=== Settlement and expansion in North America ===
After succeeding his brother in 1685, King James II and his lieutenant, Edmund Andros, sought to assert the crown's authority over colonial affairs. James was deposed by the new joint monarchy of William and Mary in the Glorious Revolution, but William and Mary quickly reinstated many of the James's colonial policies, including the mercantilist Navigation Acts and the Board of Trade. The Massachusetts Bay Colony, Plymouth Colony and the Province of Maine were incorporated into the Province of Massachusetts Bay, and New York and the Massachusetts Bay Colony were reorganized as royal colonies, with a governor appointed by the king. Maryland, which had experienced a revolution against the Calvert family, also became a royal colony, though the Calverts retained much of their land and revenue in the colony. Even those colonies that retained their charters or proprietors were forced to assent to much greater royal control than had existed before the 1690s.

Between immigration, the importation of slaves, and natural population growth, the colonial population in British North America grew immensely in the 18th century. According to historian Alan Taylor, the population of the Thirteen Colonies (the British North American colonies which would eventually form the United States) stood at 1.5 million in 1750. More than ninety percent of the colonists lived as farmers, though cities like Philadelphia, New York, and Boston flourished. With the defeat of the Dutch and the imposition of the Navigation Acts, the British colonies in North America became part of the global British trading network. The colonists traded foodstuffs, wood, tobacco, and various other resources for Asian tea, West Indian coffee, and West Indian sugar, among other items. Native Americans far from the Atlantic coast supplied the Atlantic market with beaver fur and deerskins, and sought to preserve their independence by maintaining a balance of power between the French and English. By 1770, the economic output of the Thirteen Colonies made up forty percent of the gross domestic product of the British Empire.

Prior to 1660, almost all immigrants to the English colonies of North America had migrated freely, though most paid for their passage by becoming indentured servants. Improved economic conditions and an easing of religious persecution in Europe made it increasingly difficult to recruit labor to the colonies in the 17th and 18th centuries. Partly due to this shortage of free labor, the population of slaves in British North America grew dramatically between 1680 and 1750; the growth was driven by a mixture of forced immigration and the reproduction of slaves. In the Southern Colonies, which relied most heavily on slave labor, the slaves supported vast plantation economies lorded over by increasingly wealthy elites. By 1775, slaves made up one-fifth of the population of the Thirteen Colonies but less than ten percent of the population of the Middle Colonies and New England Colonies. Though a smaller proportion of the English population migrated to British North America after 1700, the colonies attracted new immigrants from other European countries, including Catholic settlers from Ireland and Protestant Germans. As the 18th century progressed, colonists began to settle far from the Atlantic coast. Pennsylvania, Virginia, Connecticut, and Maryland all lay claim to the land in the Ohio River valley, and the colonies engaged in a scramble to expand west.

Following the 1684 revocation of the Somers Isles Company's Royal Charter, seafaring Bermudians established an inter-colonial trade network, with Charleston, South Carolina (settled from Bermuda in 1670 under William Sayle, and on the same latitude as Bermuda, although Cape Hatteras, North Carolina, is the nearest landfall to Bermuda) forming a continental hub for their trade (Bermuda itself produced only ships and seamen). The widespread activities and settlement of Bermudians has resulted in many localities named after Bermuda dotting the map of North America.

=== Conflicts with the French and Spanish ===
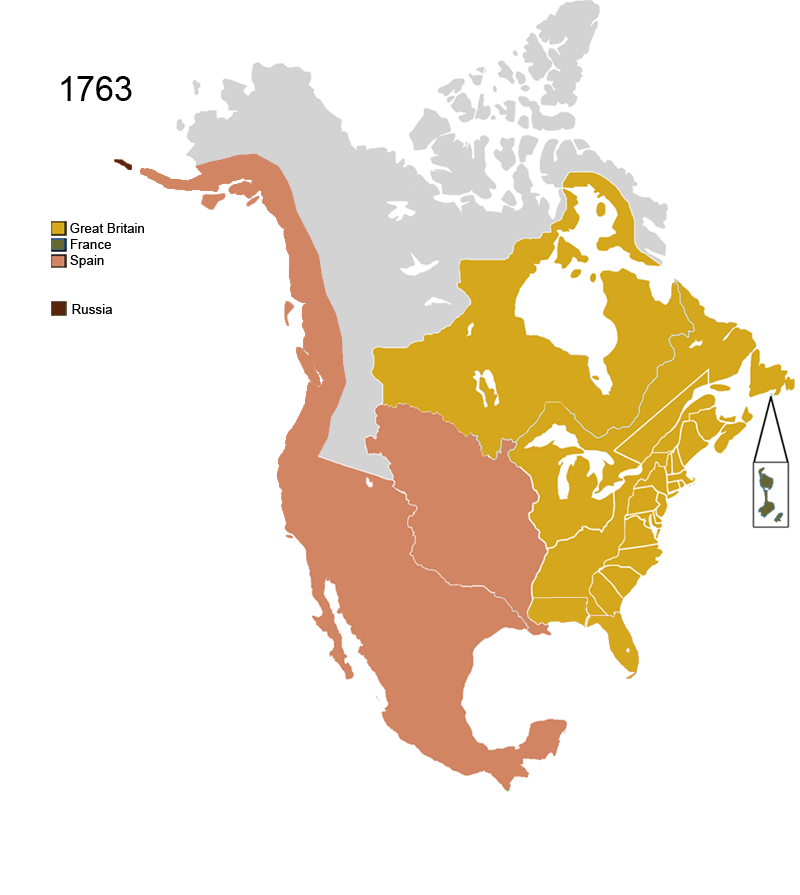
After the end of the French and Indian War in 1763, North America was dominated by the British and Spanish Empires

The Glorious Revolution and the succession of William III, who had long resisted French hegemony as the Stadtholder of the Dutch Republic, ensured that England and its colonies would come into conflict with the French empire of Louis XIV after 1689. Under the leadership of Samuel de Champlain, the French had established Quebec City on the St Lawrence River in 1608, and it became the center of French colony of Canada. France and England engaged in a proxy war via Native American allies during and after the Nine Years' War, while the powerful Iroquois declared their neutrality. War between France and England continued in Queen Anne's War, the North American component of the larger War of the Spanish Succession. In the 1713 Treaty of Utrecht, which ended the War of Spanish Succession, the British won possession of the French territories of Newfoundland and Acadia, the latter of which was renamed Nova Scotia. In the 1730s, James Oglethorpe proposed that the area south of the Carolinas be colonized to provide a buffer against Spanish Florida, and he was part of a group of trustees that were granted temporary proprietorship over the Province of Georgia. Oglethorpe and his compatriots hoped to establish a utopian colony that banned slavery, but by 1750 the colony remained sparsely populated, and Georgia became a crown colony in 1752.

In 1754, the Ohio Company started to build a fort at the confluence of the Allegheny River and the Monongahela River. A larger French force initially chased the Virginians away, but was forced to retreat after the Battle of Jumonville Glen. After reports of the battle reached the French and British capitals, the Seven Years' War broke out in 1756; the North American component of this war is known as the French and Indian War. After the Duke of Newcastle returned to power as Prime Minister in 1757, he and his foreign minister, William Pitt, devoted unprecedented financial resources to the transoceanic conflict. The British won a series of victories after 1758, conquering much of New France by the end of 1760. Spain entered the war on France's side in 1762 and promptly lost several American territories to Britain. The 1763 Treaty of Paris ended the war, and France surrendered almost all of the portion of New France to the east of the Mississippi River to the British. France separately ceded its lands west of the Mississippi River to Spain, and Spain ceded Florida to Britain. With the newly acquired territories, the British created the provinces of East Florida, West Florida, and Quebec, all of which were placed under military governments. In the Caribbean, Britain retained Grenada, St. Vincent, Dominica, and Tobago, but returned control of Martinique, Havana, and other colonial possessions to France or Spain.

== The Americans break away, 1763–1783 ==
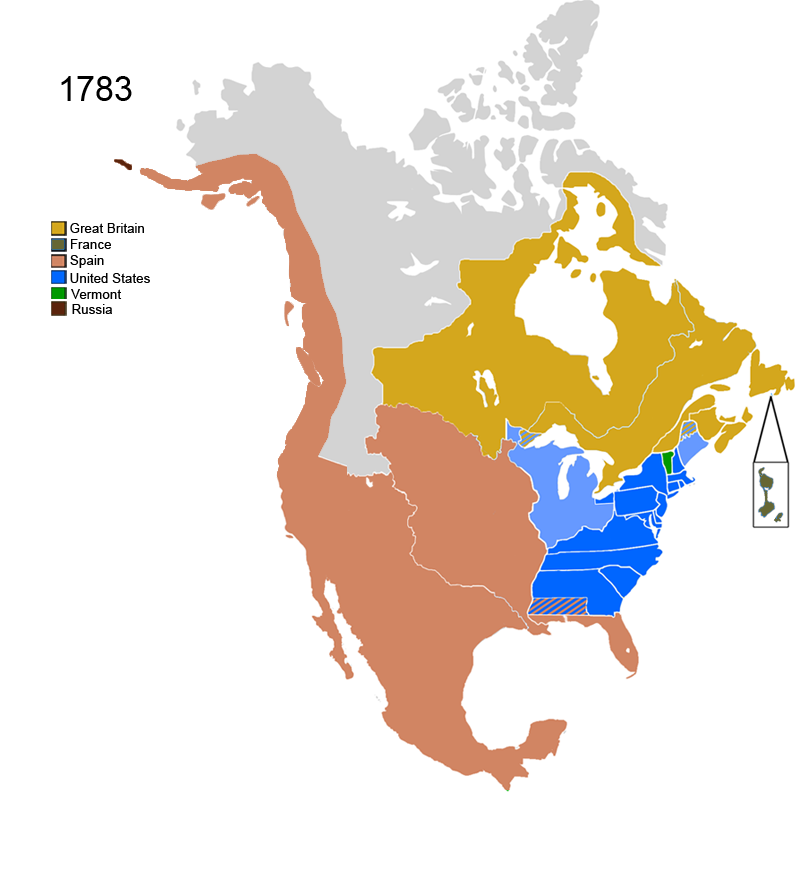
North America after the 1783 Treaty of Paris

The British subjects of North America believed the unwritten British constitution protected their rights and that the governmental system—with the House of Commons, the House of Lords, and the monarch sharing power—found an ideal balance among democracy, oligarchy, and tyranny. However, the British were saddled with huge debts following the French and Indian War. As much of the British debt had been generated by the defense of the colonies, British leaders felt that the colonies should contribute more funds, and they began imposing taxes such as the Sugar Act 1764. Increased British control of the Thirteen Colonies upset the colonists and upended the notion many colonists held: that they were equal partners in the British Empire. Meanwhile, seeking to avoid another expensive war with Native Americans, Britain issued the Royal Proclamation of 1763, which restricted settlement west of the Appalachian Mountains. However, it was effectively replaced five years later thanks to the Treaty of Fort Stanwix. The Thirteen Colonies became increasingly divided between Patriots, opposed to parliamentary taxation without representation, and Loyalists, who supported the king. In the British colonies nearest to the Thirteen Colonies, however, protests were muted, as most colonists accepted the new taxes. These provinces had smaller populations, were largely dependent on the British military, and had less of a tradition of self-rule.

The British were conflicted with different perspectives of how to deal with this matter as well. The first perspective was to grant the Colonies independence. Josiah Tucker, one of the first British promoters of colonial independence, argued that Britain would have only saved blood and treasure if they were able to completely cast the colonies much earlier. Other British individuals too the opposition stance to Tucker. Many leaders in Parliament and King George Ill believed that they must use military force to subdue the colonies back into the order. Finally, Edmund Burke stated a third perspective on the matter; one that said both parties were at fault. He argued that both sides have created a misconception of the other party which as resulted in a great mistrust between the two. These three perspectives all played in the balance during the decision making of the British during this period of history.

At the Battles of Lexington and Concord in April 1775, the Patriots repulsed a British force charged with seizing militia arsenals. The Second Continental Congress assembled in May 1775 and sought to coordinate armed resistance to Britain. It established an impromptu government that recruited soldiers and printed its own money. Announcing a permanent break with Britain, the delegates adopted a Declaration of Independence on 4 July 1776 for the United States of America. The French formed a military alliance with the United States in 1778 following the British defeat at the Battle of Saratoga. Spain joined France to regain Gibraltar from Britain. A combined Franco-American operation trapped a British invasion army at Yorktown, Virginia, forcing them to surrender in October 1781. The surrender shocked Britain. The king wanted to keep fighting, but he lost control of Parliament and peace negotiations began. In the 1783 Treaty of Paris, Britain ceded all of its North American territory south of the Great Lakes, except for the two Florida colonies, which were ceded to Spain.

With their close ties of blood and trade with the continental colonies, especially Virginia and South Carolina, Bermudians leaned towards the rebels during the American War of Independence, supplying them with privateering ships and gunpowder, but the power of the Royal Navy on the surrounding Atlantic left no possibility of their joining the rebellion, and they eventually availed themselves of the opportunities of privateering against their former kinsmen. Although often mistaken for being in the West Indies, Bermuda is nearer to Canada (and was initially grouped within British North America, retaining close links especially with the Nova Scotia and Newfoundland until the continental colonies were confederated into Canada) than to the West Indies, and the nearest landfall is North Carolina. Following the independence of the United States, this would make Bermuda of supreme importance to Britain's strategic control of the region, including its ability to protect its shipping in the area and its ability to project its power against the Atlantic seaboard of the United States, as was to be shown during the American War of 1812.

Having defeated a combined Franco-Spanish naval force at the decisive 1782 Battle of the Saintes, Britain retained control of Gibraltar and all its pre-war Caribbean possessions except for Tobago. Economically, the new nation became a major trading partner of Britain.

== Second British Empire, 1783–1945 ==
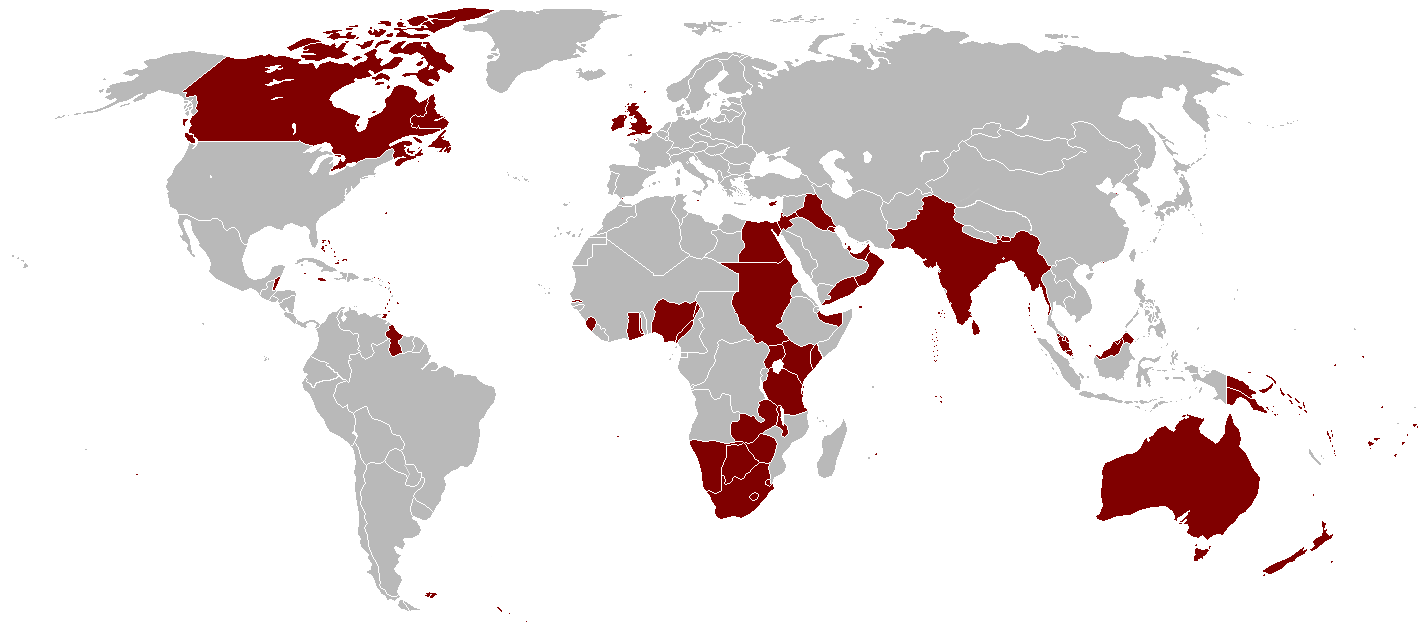
The British Empire in 1921

The loss of a large portion of British America defined the transition between the "first" and "second" empires, in which Britain shifted its attention away from the Americas to Asia, the Pacific, and later Africa. Influenced by the ideas of Adam Smith, Britain also shifted away from mercantile ideals and began to prioritize the expansion of trade rather than territorial possessions. During the nineteenth century, some observers described Britain as having an "unofficial" empire based on the export of goods and financial investments around the world, including the newly independent republics of Latin America. Though this unofficial empire did not require direct British political control, it often involved the use of gunboat diplomacy and military intervention to protect British investments and ensure the free flow of trade.

From 1793 to 1815, Britain was almost constantly at war, first in the French Revolutionary Wars and then in the Napoleonic Wars. During the wars, Britain took control of many French, Spanish, and Dutch Caribbean colonies. Tensions between Britain and the United States escalated during the Napoleonic Wars, as the United States took advantage of its neutrality to undercut the British embargo on French-controlled ports, and Britain tried to cut off that American trade with France. The Royal Navy, which was desperately short of trained seamen and constantly losing deserters who sought better-paid work under less draconian discipline aboard American merchant vessels, boarded American ships to search for deserters, sometimes resulting in the Impressment of American sailors into the Royal Navy. The United States, at the same time, coveted the acquisition of Canada, which Britain could ill afford to lose as its naval and merchant fleets had been constructed largely from American timber before United States independence, and from Canadian timber thereafter. Taking advantage of Britain's absorption in its war with France, the United States began the American War of 1812 with the invasion of the Canadas, but the British Army mounted a successful defence with minimal regular forces, supported by militia and native allies, while the Royal Navy blockaded the United States of America's Atlantic coastline from Bermuda, strangling its merchant trade, and carried out amphibious raids including the Chesapeake Campaign with its Burning of Washington. As the United States failed to make any gains before British victory against France in 1814 freed British forces from Europe to be wielded against it, and as Britain had no aim in its war with its former colonies other than to defend its remaining continental territory, the war ended with the pre-war boundaries reaffirmed by the 1814 Treaty of Ghent, ensuring Canada's future would be separate from that of the United States.

Following the final defeat of French Emperor Napoleon in 1815, Britain gained ownership of Trinidad, Tobago, British Guiana, and Saint Lucia, as well as other territories outside of the Western Hemisphere. The Treaty of 1818 with the United States set a large portion of the Canada–United States border at the 49th parallel and also established a joint U.S.–British occupation of Oregon Country. In the 1846 Oregon Treaty, the United States and Britain agreed to split Oregon Country along the 49th parallel north with the exception of Vancouver Island, which was assigned in its entirety to Britain.

After warring throughout the eighteenth and nineteenth centuries in both Europe and the Americas, the British and French reached a lasting peace after 1815. Britain would fight only one war (the Crimean War) against a European power during the remainder of the nineteenth century, and that war did not lead to territorial changes in the Americas. However, the British Empire continued to engage in wars such as the First Opium War against China; it also put down rebellions such as the Indian Rebellion of 1857, the Canadian Rebellions of 1837–1838, and the Jamaican Morant Bay rebellion of 1865. A strong abolition movement had emerged in the United Kingdom in the late-eighteenth century, and Britain abolished the slave trade in 1807. In the mid-nineteenth century, the economies of the British Caribbean colonies would suffer as a result of the Slavery Abolition Act 1833, which abolished slavery throughout the British Empire, and the 1846 Sugar Duties Act, which ended preferential tariffs for sugar imports from the Caribbean. To replace the labor of former slaves, British plantations on Trinidad and other parts of the Caribbean began to hire indentured servants from India and China.

=== Establishing the Dominion of Canada ===
Despite its defeat in the American Revolutionary War and shift towards a new form of imperialism during the nineteenth century, the British Empire retained numerous colonies in the Americas after 1783. During and after the American Revolutionary War, between 40,000 and 100,000 defeated Loyalists migrated from the United States to Canada. The 14,000 Loyalists who went to the Saint John and Saint Croix river valleys, then part of Nova Scotia, felt too far removed from the provincial government in Halifax, so London split off New Brunswick as a separate colony in 1784. The Constitutional Act 1791 created the provinces of Upper Canada (mainly English-speaking) and Lower Canada (mainly French-speaking) to defuse tensions between the French and British communities, and implemented governmental systems similar to those employed in Britain, with the intention of asserting imperial authority and not allowing the sort of popular control of government that was perceived to have led to the American Revolution.

The British also expanded their mercantile interests in the North Pacific. Spain and Britain had become rivals in the area which came to a head with the Nootka Crisis in 1789. Both sides mobilised for war, and Spain counted on France for support but when France refused, Spain had to back down and capitulated to British terms leading to the Nootka Convention. The outcome of the crisis was a humiliation for Spain and a triumph for Britain, for the former had practically renounced all sovereignty on the North Pacific coast. This opened the way to British expansion in that area, and a number of expeditions took place; firstly a naval expedition led by George Vancouver which explored the inlets around the Pacific NorthWest, particularly around Vancouver Island. On land, expeditions took place hoping for a discovery of a practicable river route to the Pacific for the extension of the North American fur trade (the North West Company). Sir Alexander Mackenzie led the first starting out in 1792, and a year a later he became the first European to reach the Pacific overland north of the Rio Grande reaching the ocean near present-day Bella Coola. This preceded the Lewis and Clark Expedition by twelve years. Shortly thereafter, Mackenzie's companion, John Finlay, founded the first permanent European settlement in British Columbia, Fort St. John. The North West Company sought further explorations firstly by David Thompson, starting in 1797, and later by Simon Fraser. More expedition took place in the early 1800s and pushed into the wilderness territories of the Rocky Mountains and Interior Plateau and all the way to the Strait of Georgia on the Pacific Coast expanding British North America Westward.

In 1815, Lieutenant-General Sir George Prevost was Captain-General and Governor-in-Chief in and over the Provinces of Upper-Canada, Lower-Canada, Nova-Scotia, and New~Brunswick, and their several Dependencies, Vice-Admiral of the same, Lieutenant-General and Commander of all His Majesty's Forces in the said Provinces of Lower Canada and Upper-Canada, Nova-Scotia and New-Brunswick, and their several Dependencies, and in the islands of Newfoundland, Prince Edward, Cape Breton and the Bermudas, &c. &c. &c. Beneath Prevost, the staff of the British Army in the Provinces of Nova-Scotia, New-Brunswick, and their Dependencies, including the Islands of Newfoundland, Cape Breton, Prince Edward and Bermuda were under the Command of Lieutenant-General Sir John Coape Sherbrooke. Below Sherbrooke, the Bermuda Garrison was under the immediate control of the Lieutenant-Governor of Bermuda, Major-General George Horsford (although the Lieutenant-Governor of Bermuda was eventually restored to a full civil Governorship, in his military role as Commander-in-Chief of Bermuda he remained subordinate to the Commander-in-Chief in Halifax, and naval and ecclesiastic links between Bermuda the Maritimes also remained; The military links were severed by Canadian confederation at the end of the 1860s, which resulted in the removal of the British Army from Canada and its Commander-in-Chief from Halifax when the Canadian Government took responsibility for the defence of Canada; The naval links remained until the Royal Navy withdrew from Halifax in 1905, handing its dockyard there over to the Royal Canadian Navy; The established Church of England in Bermuda, within which the Governor held office as Ordinary, remained linked to the colony of Newfoundland under the same Bishop until 1919).

In response to the Rebellions of 1837–1838, Britain passed the Act of Union in 1840, which united Upper Canada and Lower Canada into the Province of Canada. Responsible government was first granted to Nova Scotia in 1848, and was soon extended to the other British North American colonies. With the passage of the British North America Act, 1867 by the British Parliament, Upper and Lower Canada, New Brunswick, and Nova Scotia were formed into the confederation of Canada. Rupert's Land (which was divided into Manitoba and the Northwest Territories), British Columbia, and Prince Edward Island joined Canada by the end of 1873, but Newfoundland would not join Canada until 1949. Like other British dominions such as Australia, New Zealand, and South Africa, Canada enjoyed autonomy over its domestic affairs but recognized the British monarch as head of state and cooperated closely with Britain on defense issues. After the passage of the 1931 Statute of Westminster, Canada and other dominions were fully independent of British legislative control; they could nullify British laws and Britain could no longer pass laws for them without their consent.

United States independence, and the closure of its ports to British trade, combined with growing peace in the region which reduced the risk to shipping (resulting in smaller evasive merchantmen, such as those that Bermudian shipbuilders turned out, losing favour to larger clippers), and the advent of metal hulls and steam engines, were to slowly strangle Bermuda's maritime economy, while its newfound importance as a Royal Navy and British Army base from which the North America and West Indies Station could be controlled meant increasing interest from the British Government in its governance.

Bermuda was grouped with British North America, especially Nova Scotia and Newfoundland (its closest British neighbours), following United States Independence. When war with France followed the French Revolution, a Royal Naval Dockyard was established at Bermuda in 1795, which was to alternate with Royal Naval Dockyard, Halifax (Bermuda during the summers and Halifax during the winters) as the Royal Navy headquarters and main base for the River St. Lawrence and Coast of America Station (which was to become the North America Station in 1813, the North America and Lakes of Canada Station in 1816, the North America and Newfoundland Station in 1821, the North America and West Indies Station about 1820, and finally the America and West Indies Station from 1915 to 1956) before becoming the year-round headquarters and main base from about 1818.

The regular army garrison (established in 1701 but withdrawn in 1784) was re-established in 1794 and grew during the Nineteenth Century to be one of the British Army's largest, relative to Bermuda's size. The blockade of the Atlantic seaboard ports of the United States and the Chesapeake Campaign (including the Burning of Washington) were orchestrated from Bermuda during the American War of 1812. Preparations for similar operations were carried out in Bermuda when the Trent Affair nearly brought Britain to war with the United States during the American Civil War (Bermuda had already been serving as the primary tran-shipment point for British and European manufactured arms which were smuggled into Confederate ports, especially Charleston, South Carolina, by blockade runners; cotton was brought out from the same ports by the blockade runners to be traded at Bermuda for the war materiel), and Bermuda played important roles (as a naval base, trans-Atlantic convoy forming-up point, as a connecting point in the Cable and Wireless Nova Scotia-to-British West Indies submarine telegraph cable, as a wireless station, and from the 1930s as a site for airbases used as a staging point for trans-Atlantic flights and for operating anti-submarine air patrols over the North Atlantic) in the Atlantic theatre of the First World War and in the Battle of the Atlantic during the Second World War, when the already existing Royal Navy, British Army, and Royal Air Force bases were joined by a Royal Canadian Navy base and naval and air bases of the allied United States. It remained a vital air and naval base during the Cold War, with American and Canadian bases existing alongside the British ones from the Second World War until 1995.

=== British Honduras and Falkland Islands ===
In the early 17th century, English sailors had begun cutting logwood in parts of coastal Central America over which the Spanish exercised little control. By the early 18th century, a small British settlement had been established on the Belize River, though the Spanish refused to recognize British control over the region and frequently evicted British settlers. In the 1783 Treaty of Paris and the 1786 Convention of London, Spain gave Britain the right to cut logwood and mahogany in the area between the Hondo River and the Belize River, but Spain retained sovereignty over this area. Following the 1850 Clayton–Bulwer Treaty with the United States, Britain agreed to evacuate its settlers from the Bay Islands and the Mosquito Coast, but it retained control of the settlement on the Belize River. In 1862, Britain established the crown colony of the British Honduras at this location.

The British first established a presence on the Falkland Islands in 1765 but were compelled to withdraw for economic reasons related to the American War of Independence in 1774. The islands continued to be used by British sealers and whalers, although the settlement of Port Egmont was destroyed by the Spanish in 1780. Argentina attempted to establish a colony in the ruins of the former Spanish settlement of Puerto Soledad, which ended with the British return in 1833. The British governed the uninhabited South Georgia Island, which had been claimed by Captain James Cook in 1775, as a dependency of the Falkland Islands.

== Decolonization and overseas territories, 1945–present ==
=== Successful independence movements ===
The Commonwealth of Nations consists of former territories of the British Empire in the Americas and elsewhere

With the onset of the Cold War in the late 1940s, the British government began to assemble plans for the independence of the empire's colonies in Africa, Asia, and the Americas. British authorities initially planned for a three-decades-long process in which each colony would develop a self-governing and democratic parliament, but unrest and fears of Communist infiltration in the colonies encouraged the British to speed up the move towards self-governance. Compared to other European empires, which experienced wars of independence such as the Algerian War and the Portuguese Colonial War, the British post-war process of decolonization in the Caribbean was relatively peaceful.

In an attempt to unite its Caribbean colonies, Britain established the West Indies Federation in 1958. The federation collapsed following the loss of its two largest members, Jamaica and Trinidad, each of which attained independence in 1962; Trinidad formed a union with Tobago to become the country of Trinidad and Tobago. The eastern Caribbean islands, as well as the Bahamas, gained independence in the 1960s, 1970s, and 1980s. Guyana achieved independence in 1966. Britain's last colony on the American mainland, British Honduras, became a self-governing colony in 1964 and was renamed Belize in 1973, achieving full independence in 1981. A dispute with Guatemala over claims to Belize was left unresolved.

=== Remaining territories ===
Though many of the Caribbean territories of the British Empire gained independence, Anguilla and the Turks and Caicos Islands opted to revert to British rule after they had already started on the path to independence. The British Virgin Islands, Bermuda, the Cayman Islands, Montserrat, and the Falkland Islands also remain under the jurisdiction of Britain. In 1982, Britain defeated Argentina in the Falklands War, an undeclared war in which Argentina attempted to seize control of the Falkland Islands. In 1983, the British Nationality Act 1981 renamed the existing British colonies as "British dependent territories". (Note: Schedule 6 of the British Nationality Act 1981 reclassified the remaining self-governing colonies (those with their own elected legislatures and a degree of autonomy, such as Bermuda) and Crown colonies (those without elected legislatures, which were governed entirely by British Government-appointed Governors with advisory councils, such as Hong Kong) as "British Dependent Territories".)

Historically, colonials shared the same citizenship (although Magna Carta had effectively created English citizenship, citizens were still termed subjects of the King of England or English subjects. With the union of the kingdoms of England and Scotland, this was replaced with British subject, which encompassed citizens throughout the sovereign territory of the British government, including the colonies) as Britons. Although historically all British subjects had the right to vote for candidates, or to themselves stand for election, to the House of Commons (providing that they were male, prior to women's suffrage, and met the property qualification, when it applied). The British government (as with the Government of the Kingdom of England before it) has never assigned seats in the House of Commons to any colony, effectively disenfranchising colonials at the sovereign level of their government. There has also never been a peer in the House of Lords representing any colony. Colonials were therefore not consulted, or required to give their consent, to a series of acts that passed by the Parliament of the United Kingdom between 1968 and 1982, which were to limit their rights and ultimately change their citizenship.

When several colonies were elevated before the Second World War to dominion status, collectively forming the old British Commonwealth (as distinct from the United Kingdom and its dependent colonies), their citizens remained British subjects, and in theory, any British subject born anywhere in the world had the same basic right to enter, reside, and work in the United Kingdom as a British subject born in the United Kingdom whose parents were also both British subjects born in the United Kingdom (although many governmental policies and practices acted to thwart the free exercise of these right by various demographic groups of colonials, including Greek Cypriots).

When the dominions and an increasing number of colonies began choosing complete independence from the United Kingdom after the Second World War, the Commonwealth was transformed into a community of independent nations, each recognising the British monarch as their own head of state (creating separate monarchies with the same person occupying all of the separate Thrones; the exception being republican India). British subject was replaced by the British Nationality Act 1948 with citizen of the United Kingdom and colonies for the residents of the United Kingdom and its colonies, as well as the Crown dependencies. however, as it was desired to retain free movement for all Commonwealth citizens throughout the Commonwealth, British subject was retained as a blanket nationality shared by citizens of the United Kingdom and colonies as well as the citizens of the various other Commonwealth realms.

The inflow of people of colour to the United Kingdom during the 1940s and 1950s from both remaining colonies and newly independent Commonwealth nations was responded to with a racist backlash that led to the passing of the Commonwealth Immigrants Act 1962, which restricted the rights of Commonwealth nationals to enter, reside and work in the United Kingdom. This act also allowed certain colonials (primarily ethnic Indians in African colonies) to retain citizenship of the United Kingdom and colonies if their colonies became independent, intended as a measure to ensure these persons did not become stateless if they were denied the citizenship of their newly independent nation.

Many ethnic-Indians did find themselves marginalised in newly independent nations (notably Kenya) and relocated to the United Kingdom, in response to which the Commonwealth Immigrants Act 1968 was rapidly passed, stripping all British subjects (including citizens of the United Kingdom and colonies) who were not born in the United Kingdom, and who did not have a citizen of the United Kingdom and colonies parent born in the United Kingdom or some other qualification (such as existing residence status), of the rights to freely enter, reside and work in the United Kingdom.

This was followed by the Immigration Act 1971, which effectively divided citizens of the United Kingdom and colonies into two types, although their citizenship remained the same: Those from the United Kingdom itself, who retained the rights of free entry, abode, and work in the United Kingdom; and those born in the colonies (or in foreign countries to British colonial parents), from whom those rights were denied.

The British Nationality Act 1981, which entered into force on 1 January 1983, abolished British subject status, and stripped colonials of their full British citizen of the United Kingdom and colonies, replacing it with British dependent territories citizenship, which entailed no right of abode or to work anywhere (other categories with even fewer rights were created at the same time, including British overseas citizen for former citizens of the United Kingdom and colonies born in ex-colonies).

The exceptions were the Gibraltarians (permitted to retain British nationality to retain citizenship of the European Union) and the Falkland Islanders, who were permitted to retain the same new British citizenship that became the default citizenship for those from the United Kingdom and the Crown dependencies. As the act was widely understood to have been passed in preparation for the 1997 handover of Hong Kong to the People's Republic of China (to prevent ethnic-Chinese British nationals from migrating to the United Kingdom), and given the history of neglect and racism those colonies with sizeable non-European (to use the British government's parlance) populations had endured from the British government since the end of Empire, the application of the act only to those colonies in which the citizenship was changed to British dependent territories citizenship has been perceived as a particularly egregious example of the racism of the British government.

The stripping of birth rights from at least some of the colonial CUKCs in 1968 and 1971, and the change of their citizenships in 1983, actually violated the rights granted them by royal charters at the founding of the colonies. Bermuda (fully The Somers Isles or Islands of Bermuda), by example, had been settled by the London Company (which had been in occupation of the archipelago since the 1609 wreck of the Sea Venture) in 1612, when it received its Third Royal Charter from King James I, amending the boundaries of the First Colony of Virginia far enough across the Atlantic to include Bermuda. The citizenship rights guaranteed to settlers by King James I in the original royal charter of the 10 April 1606, thereby applied to Bermudians:

Alsoe wee doe, for us, our heires and successors, declare by theise presentes that all and everie the parsons being our subjects which shall dwell and inhabit within everie or anie of the saide severall Colonies and plantacions and everie of theire children which shall happen to be borne within the limitts and precincts of the said severall Colonies and plantacions shall have and enjoy all liberties, franchises and immunites within anie of our other dominions to all intents and purposes as if they had been abiding and borne within this our realme of Englande or anie other of our saide dominions.

These rights were confirmed in the royal charter granted to the London Company's spin-off, the Company of the City of London for the Plantacion of The Somers Isles, in 1615 on Bermuda being separated from Virginia:

And wee doe for vs our heires and successors declare by these Pnts, that all and euery persons being our subjects which shall goe and inhabite wthin the said Somer Ilandes and every of their children and posterity which shall happen to bee borne within the limits thereof shall haue and enjoy all libertyes franchesies and immunities of free denizens and natural subjectes within any of our dominions to all intents and purposes, as if they had beene abiding and borne wthin this our Kingdome of England or in any other of our Dominions

In regards to former CUKCs of Saint Helena, Lord Beaumont of Whitley in the House of Lords debate on the British Overseas Territories Bill on the 10 July 2001, stated:

Citizenship was granted irrevocably by Charles I. It was taken away, quite wrongly, by Parliament in surrender to the largely racist opposition to immigration at the time.

Some Conservative Party backbenchers stated that it was the unpublished intention of the Conservative British government to return to a single citizenship for the United Kingdom and all of the remaining territories once Hong Kong had been handed over to China. Whether this was so will never be known as by 1997 the Labour Party was in government. The Labour Party had declared prior to the election that the colonies had been ill-treated by the British Nationality Act 1981, and it had made a promise to return to a single citizenship for the United Kingdom and the remaining territories part of its election manifesto. Other matters took precedence, however, and this commitment was not acted upon during Labour's first term in government. The House of Lords, in which many former colonial governors sat, lost patience and tabled and passed its own bill, then handed it down to the House of Commons to confirm. As a result, the British dependent territories were renamed the British overseas territories in 2002 (the term dependent territory had caused much ire in the former colonies, such as well-heeled Bermuda that had been largely self-reliant and self-governed for nearly four centuries, as it implied not only that they were other than British, but that their relationship to Britain and to real British people was both inferior and parasitic).

At the same time, although Labour had promised a return to a single citizenship for the United Kingdom, Crown dependencies, and all remaining territories, British dependent territories citizenship, renamed British overseas territories citizenship, remained the default citizenship for the territories, other than the Falkland Islands and Gibraltar (for which British citizenship is still the default citizenship). The bars to residence and work in the United Kingdom that had been raised against holders of British dependent territories citizenship by The British Nationality Act 1981 were, however, removed, and British citizenship was made attainable by simply obtaining a second British passport with the citizenship recorded as British citizen (requiring a change to passport legislation as prior to 2002, it had been illegal to possess two British passports).

Prior to 2002, all British passports obtained in a British dependent territory were of a design modified from those issued in the United Kingdom, lacking the European Union name on the front cover, having the name of the specific territorial government noted on the front cover below "British passport", and having the request on the inside of the front cover normally issued by the secretary of state on behalf of the Queen instead issued by the governor of the territory on behalf of the Queen. Although this design made it easier for United Kingdom Border Control to distinguish a colonial from a 'real' British citizen, these passports were issued within the territory to the holder of any type of British citizenship with the appropriate citizenship stamped inside. The normal British passports issued in the United Kingdom and by British consulates in Commonwealth and foreign countries were similarly issued to holders of any type of British citizenship with the appropriate citizenship, or citizenships, stamped inside. From 2002, the thenceforth local governments of the British overseas territories in which British overseas territories citizenship was the default citizenship were no longer allowed to issue or replace any British passport except the type for their own territory only with British overseas territories citizen recorded inside (and a stamp from the local government showing the holder has legal status as a local (in Bermuda, by example, the stamp records "the holder is registered as a Bermudian"), as neither British dependent territories citizenship nor British overseas territories citizenship actually entitles the holder to any more rights in any territory than in the United Kingdom, simply serving to enable colonials to be distinguished from real British people for the benefit of United Kingdom Border Control.

Since 2002, only the United Kingdom Government has issued normal British passports with the citizenship stamped as British citizen. Since June 2016, only the Passport Office in the United Kingdom is permitted to issue any type of British passport. Local governments of territories can still accept passport applications, but must forward them to the Passport Office. This means that the territorial pattern of British passport is no longer available, with all passports issued since then being of the standard type issued in the United Kingdom, with the appropriate type of British citizenship recorded inside; a problem for Bermudians as they have always enjoyed freer entry into the United States than other British citizens, but the United States had updated its entry requirements (prior to the 2001 terrorist attacks on New York City and Washington, D.C., Bermudians did not need a passport to enter the US, and Americans did not need a passport to enter Bermuda. Since then, anyone entering the US, including US citizens, must present a passport) to specify that, to be admitted as a Bermudian the passport must be of the territorial type specific to Bermuda, with the country code inside being that used for Bermuda as distinct from other parts of the British Realm, with the citizenship stamped as British dependent territories citizenship or British overseas territories citizenship, and the stamp from Bermuda Immigration showing the holder has Bermudian status. From the point of view of Bermuda Immigration, only the stamp showing the holder has Bermudian status indicates the holder is Bermudian, and that can be entered into any type of British passport with any type of British citizenship recorded, so the United States requirements are more stringent than Bermuda's, and impossible to meet with any British passport issued to a Bermudian since the end of June 2016.

The eleven inhabited territories are self-governing to varying degrees and are reliant on the UK for foreign relations and defence. Most former British colonies and protectorates are among the 52 member states of the Commonwealth of Nations, a non-political, voluntary association of equal members, comprising a population of around 2.2 billion people. Fifteen Commonwealth realms, including Canada and several countries in the Caribbean, voluntarily continue to share the British monarch, King Charles III, as their head of state.

== List of colonies ==
=== Former North American colonies ===
==== Canadian territories ====
These colonies and territories (known, together with Bermuda, as British North America following independence of the United States of America) were confederated to form modern Canada between 1867 and 1873 unless otherwise noted:

- British Columbia (previously part of Oregon Country before its 1846 division between Britain and the United States)
- Province of Canada (formed from the merger of Upper Canada and Lower Canada in 1841)
- Nova Scotia
- New Brunswick
- Dominion of Newfoundland (became part of Canada in 1949)
- Prince Edward Island
- Rupert's Land (became part of Canada as Manitoba and the Northwest Territories)

==== Thirteen Colonies ====
The Thirteen Colonies, which became the original states of the United States following the 1781 ratification of the Articles of Confederation:

- Province of Massachusetts Bay
- Province of New Hampshire
- Colony of Rhode Island and Providence Plantations
- Connecticut Colony
- Province of New York
- Province of New Jersey
- Province of Pennsylvania
- Delaware Colony
- Province of Maryland
- Colony of Virginia
- Province of North Carolina
- Province of South Carolina
- Province of Georgia

==== Other North American colonies ====
These colonies were acquired in 1763 and ceded to Spain in 1783:

- Province of East Florida (from Spain, retroceded to Spain)
- Province of West Florida (from France as part of eastern French Louisiana, ceded to Spain)

=== Former colonies in the Caribbean and South America ===
These present-day countries formed part of the British West Indies prior to gaining independence during the 20th century:

- Antigua and Barbuda (gained independence in 1981)
- The Bahamas (gained independence in 1973)
- Barbados (gained independence in 1966)
- Belize (gained independence in 1981; formerly known as British Honduras)
- Dominica (gained independence in 1978)
- Grenada (gained independence in 1974)
- Guyana (gained independence in 1966; formerly known as British Guiana)
- Jamaica (gained independence in 1962)
- Saint Kitts and Nevis (gained independence in 1983)
- Saint Lucia (gained independence in 1979)
- Saint Vincent and the Grenadines (gained independence in 1979)
- Trinidad and Tobago (gained independence in 1962)

=== Current territories ===
These British Overseas Territories in the Americas remain under the jurisdiction of the United Kingdom:

- Anguilla
- Bermuda
- British Virgin Islands
- Cayman Islands
- Falkland Islands
- Montserrat
- Turks and Caicos Islands

== See also ==
- Atlantic history
- Atlantic World
- Demographics of the British Empire
- Historiography of the British Empire
- History of Belize
- History of Guyana
- History of the Falkland Islands
- History of the foreign relations of the United Kingdom
- Imperialism
- Indigenous peoples of the Americas
- Early modern Britain
- French and Indian Wars
