= Bayani =

Bayani may refer to:

- Bayani, Afghanistan
- Bayani, Iran
- An adherant of Bábism, also called the Bayani religion
- Bayani (album)
- Bayani (political party)
- Bayani (TV series), Filipino educational TV program
- Bayani Agbayani, Filipino comedian
- Bayani Casimiro, Filipino dancer and comedian
- Bayani Fernando, Filipino politician
- Bayani: Kanino Ka Kakampi?, Philippine video game
- The Groovy Girls doll line, by Manhattan Toy, features a female doll named Bayani

== See also ==
- Bayan (disambiguation)
