= Bayjan =

Bayjan (Persian: بايجان or بائيجان) may refer to:

- Bayjan, Fars (بايجان - Bāyjān)
- Bayjan, Mazandaran (بائيجان - Bā’yjān)
- Bayjan, West Azerbaijan (بايجان - Bāyjān)

== See also ==
- Bajan (disambiguation)
