= Barbuda (disambiguation) =

Barbuda is an island in the Caribbean.

Barbuda may also refer to:

- Antigua and Barbuda, the country that Barbuda is contained within, also sometimes called "Barbuda"
- Barbuda Council, the government of Barbuda Island
- Barbuda (constituency), a constituency in the House of Representatives of Antigua and Barbuda
- Luiz Jorge de Barbuda (1564–1613), Portuguese cartographer

== Other uses ==
- Barbuda Codrington Airport, the former Barbuda public airport

== See also ==
- Barbudan (disambiguation)
- Antigua (disambiguation)
- Barbados (disambiguation)
- Bermuda (disambiguation)
