= La Antigua =

La Antigua may refer to:

- La Antigua Guatemala
- La Antigua, Veracruz, Mexico
- La Antigua, León, Spain

== See also ==
- Antigua (disambiguation)
