= Barbudan =

Barbudan may refer to:

- Something of, or related to Barbuda. See also the country, Antigua and Barbuda.
- A person from Barbuda, or of Barbudan descent. For information about the Barbudan people, see Barbudans and the Demographics of Barbuda.
- Barbudan Creole.

== See also ==
- Barbuda (disambiguation)
- Antiguan (disambiguation)
