= Bermuda (disambiguation) =

Bermuda, Islands of Bermuda, or The Somers Isles is an Atlantic archipelago, British Overseas Territory, and a former part of the Colony of Virginia.

Bermuda may also refer to:

== Places ==
=== United States ===
Thousands of Bermudians emigrated to North America in the seventeenth and eighteenth centuries, especially to the South-East. These émigrés left the name of the archipelago in many parts of the modern United States of America.

==== Alabama ====
- Bermuda, Alabama, a populated (community) place in Conecuh County
- Bermuda Hill, a historic plantation house near Prairieville.

==== Arizona ====
- Bermuda Falls Spring, a spring in Gila County

==== California ====
- Bermuda Dunes, a census-designated place in Riverside County

==== Connecticut ====
- Bermuda Lagoon, a lake in Fairfield County

==== Georgia ====
- Bermuda, Calhoun County, Georgia, a populated place in Calhoun County
- Bermuda, DeKalb County, Georgia, a populated place in DeKalb County
- Bermuda Hill (Georgia), a 984 feet/300 metre summit in Catoosa County
- Bermuda Island, Georgia, an island in Liberty County, also known as Colonels Island, and Heron Island (the Atlantic archipelago also had an alternate name of La Garza – Spanish for 'the Heron')

==== Louisiana ====
- Bermuda, Louisiana, an unincorporated community in Natchitoches Parish
- Bermuda Plantation, a former cotton plantation (previously called Ile Breville), belonging to the Prudhomme family, and a current locale, in Natchitoches Parish

==== Maine ====
- Little Bermuda, an island in Waldo County

==== Mississippi ====
- Bermuda Landing, an historical locale in Humphreys County

==== North Carolina ====
- Bermuda Run, North Carolina, the newest incorporated municipality in Davie County
- Bermuda Island, in Albemarle Sound

==== Pennsylvania ====
- Bermuda Springs

==== Rhode Island ====
- Block Island, advertised as the Bermuda of the North

==== South Carolina ====
- Bermuda Bluff, a cliff in Beaufort County
- Bermuda Creek, a stream in Charleston County
- Town of Bermuda, South Carolina (ca. 1699-1720s)

==== Texas ====
- Bermuda Beach, a beach on Lake Como, in Galveston County
- Bermuda Lake, (and Bermuda Dam) a reservoir in Dimmit County

==== Virginia ====
- Bermuda District, Virginia, a district of Chesterfield County
- Bermuda Hundred, Virginia, the first incorporated town in Virginia
- Bermuda Place, Virginia, in Chesterfield County
- Hopewell, Virginia, now contains what was Bermuda City and Bermuda Run

=== Elsewhere ===
- Bermuda, Warwickshire, a village in England, named to honour a former Governor of the islands of Bermuda
- Bermuda Triangle, a region of the Atlantic, roughly between Bermuda, Florida, and the West Indies

== People ==
- Jon "Bermuda" Schwartz (born 1956), a drummer for "Weird Al" Yankovic

== Arts, entertainment, and media ==
- "Bermuda" (song), a 1951 song by The Bell Sisters
- "Bermuda", a song by Roky Erickson, first released as a single, and then inserted into some albums

== Military ==
- Bermuda Hundred Campaign, a campaign during the American Civil War
- Brewster SB2A Buccaneer, also known as Brewster Bermuda, a British name for the Brewster SB2A Buccaneer two-seat scout bomber
- HMS Bermuda, seven ships of the Royal Navy named after the island
- Royal Naval Dockyard, Bermuda, known as HMD Bermuda, the dockyard at the core of the Royal Navy base in Bermuda

== Plants ==
- Bermuda Onion, also known as sweet onion, any of several varieties of mild-flavored onions shaped like a flattened sphere
- Cynodon dactylon, or Bermuda grass, a fast-growing Mediterranean grass best suited for warm climates
- Juniperus bermudiana, a juniper tree endemic to Bermuda, known as Bermuda cedar
- Lilium longiflorum, known as the Easter lily, or the Bermuda lily
- Sisyrinchium bermudiana, a flowering plant endemic to Bermuda, belonging to the Sisyrinchium genus

== Sailing ==
- Bermuda rig, a form of rigging for boats and small ships
- Bermuda sloop, a type of sailing vessel originating in the island equipped with gaff or Bermuda rig. Also used for modern sloops with Bermuda rig

== Transportation ==
- 45600 Bermuda, a British LMS Jubilee Class locomotive
- MV Bermuda, a British cruise ship launched in 1927
- Edsel Bermuda, a 1958 station wagon

== Other uses ==
- Bermuda Agreement, an aviation agreement between the United States and the United Kingdom
- Bermuda Conference, an international conference between the United Kingdom and the United States held on April 19, 1943 at Hamilton, Bermuda, concerned with the plight of European Jews
- Bermuda kite, a type of kite traditionally flown in Bermuda at Easter, symbolizing the ascent of Christ
- Bermuda national cricket team, the national cricket team of Bermuda
- Bermuda shorts, a type of short trousers

== See also ==
- Barbuda (disambiguation)
- Bermudian (disambiguation)
