= Economy of the British Empire =

The British Empire was the foremost economic power for most of the 19th century. As a result of the Industrial Revolution which began in the United Kingdom, Britain became the wealthiest country in the world by the late 18th century, and was a leading trading nation and manufacturing power.

== History ==
Soon after the defeat of France in the Revolutionary and Napoleonic Wars (1792–1815), the British Empire emerged as the principal naval and imperial power of the 19th century. Unchallenged at sea, British dominance was later described as Pax Britannica ("British Peace"), a period of relative peace in Europe and the world (1815–1914) during which the British Empire became the global hegemon and adopted the role of global policeman. It was the foremost economic power for the majority of the 19th century, a position supported by its agricultural prosperity, its role as a dominant trading nation, the ability to profit economically from its colonial possessions through trade, a massive industrial capacity, significant technological achievements, and the rise of 19th-century London as the world's leading financial centre.

The Industrial Revolution began in the United Kingdom in the mid-18th century, during which the country rapidly transitioned from an agrarian economy to an industrialized one. Productivity vastly increased through new inventions and technologies such as the steam engine, the spinning mule, and the power loom, which increased manufacturing output and reduced production costs, laying the foundation for the growth of multiple industries such as textiles, steel, and coal.

Britain became the wealthiest country in the world by the end of the 18th century. In the early 19th century, the Industrial Revolution began to transform Britain; by the time of the Great Exhibition in 1851 the country was described as the "workshop of the world". There was relatively free trade within the Empire, though the Imperial Preference was not as comprehensive as some preference systems such as the German Zollverein. The British Empire became the world's largest economy by nominal GDP in 1870 and was responsible for approximately a quarter of global trade at that time, with trade accounting for about one third of its GDP. At the turn of the 20th century, however, Britain's industrial dominance became challenged by the German Empire and the United States. The British Empire's entire economic output was eventually surpassed by that of the United States in 1916. The United Kingdom's involvement in the First World War and in the Second World War damaged Britain's economic power, and a global wave of decolonisation led to the independence of most British colonies.

== Statistics ==
Territorial GDP distribution of the British Empire (1870)
1. British India (50.0%)
2. Great Britain (37.2%)
3. Ireland (3.58%)
4. Canada (2.39%)
5. Australia (2.14%)
6. Egypt (1.69%)
7. Other territories (2.97%)

The following table gives gross domestic product (GDP) estimates of the British Empire and its territories in 1870 and 1913, as a percentage of the world economy and the empire's economy, along with comparisons to the United States and Russian Empire. The British imperial territory with the largest economy in 1870 was British India (including what are now Pakistan and Bangladesh), followed by the United Kingdom. The territory with the largest economy in 1913 was the United Kingdom, followed by British India. The table does not include GDP estimates for British African territories other than British Egypt.

British Empire territory	% of world GDP (1870)	% of empire GDP (1870)	% of world GDP (1913)	% of empire GDP (1913)
United Kingdom	9.03	37.19	9.26	47.04
British India	12.15	50.04	8.27	42.33
(United Kingdom) Ireland	0.87	3.58	0.44	1.20
Canada	0.58	2.39	1.28	3.50
Australia	0.52	2.14	0.91	2.49
Egypt	0.41	1.69	0.4	1.09
Ceylon	0.21	0.87	0.22	0.62
Burma	0.19	0.78	0.31	0.84
New Zealand	0.08	0.33	0.21	0.57
(United Kingdom) Malaya	0.05	0.21	0.1	0.27
Hong Kong	0.01	0.04	0.02	0.05
Singapore	0.01	0.04	0.02	0.05
Total British Empire	24.28	100	19.70	100
United States	8.87	36.53	18.93	96.09
Russian Empire	7.54	31.05	8.5	43.13

== See also ==
- Demographics of the British Empire
- Economic history of the United Kingdom
- Economy of India under Company rule
- Economy of India under the British Raj
