= HMS Antigua =

HMS Antigua has been the name of five ships of the Royal Navy, named after the Caribbean island of Antigua:

- HMS Antigua (1757) was a 14-gun brig-sloop that had formerly served as a privateer. She was purchased in 1757 and sold in 1763.
- HMS Antigua (1779) was a 14-gun sloop that entered service in 1779 and was sold in 1782.
- HMS Antigua (1780) was a brig that entered service in 1780 and that the French captured in May 1781. She was under the command of Lieutenant John Hutt.
- HMS Antigua (1804) was the former French privateer Egyptienne. Captured in 1804, she served as a prison ship until scrapped in 1816.
- HMS Antigua (K501) was a Colony-class frigate laid down as the United States Navy Tacoma-class patrol frigate USS Hamond (PF-73). She was launched in 1943, and delivered to the Royal Navy under Lend-Lease in 1944. She was returned to the United States Navy in 1946 and scrapped in 1947.
