= Bajan =

Bajan may refer to:

- Barbadians, or Bajans, people who are identified with Barbados
- Bajan Creole, of Bajan, an English-based creole language spoken in Barbados
  - Bajan English, a dialect of English used by Barbadians
- Bajan (surname), including a list of people with the name
- "Bajan", a song by Luis Alberto Spinetta from the 1973 album Artaud

== See also ==
- Barbadian (disambiguation)
- Bayan (disambiguation)
- Bayjan (disambiguation)
- Bhajan, an Indian devotional song
  - "Bhajan" (Ravi Shankar song)
