= Antigua (disambiguation) =

Antigua is an island in the Caribbean.

Antigua can also refer to:

== Places ==
- Antigua and Barbuda, the nation of which the island of Antigua is part
- Antigua Guatemala, a city in the central mountains of Guatemala
- Antigua, Fuerteventura, a municipality in the Canary Islands, Spain
- Antigua, Queensland, a locality in Australia

== People ==
- Orlando Antigua (born 1973), Dominican-American basketball player

== Ships ==
- Five ships of the Royal Navy named HMS Antigua
- SS Antigua, a turbo-electric liner of the United Fruit Company

== See also ==
- Antiguan (disambiguation)
- La Antigua (disambiguation)
- Antigua Winds, wind music instrument brand
- Antiqua, a typeface class
