= Bermudian =

Bermudian or Bermudan refers to something of, or related to Bermuda or a person from Bermuda, or of Bermudian descent.

Bermudian or Bermudan may also refer to:

- Bermudian cuisine
- Bermudian English, the variety of English spoken in Bermuda
- Bermudian Landing, a village in Belize

== In Pennsylvania ==
- Bermudian, Pennsylvania, an unincorporated community in Adams and York counties
- Bermudian Creek, in Washington Township, York County
