= Antiguan =

Antiguan may refer to:

- Antigua, the main island of Antigua and Barbuda
- Antigua and Barbuda, a sovereign state in the West Indies
- A person from Antigua
  - List of Antiguans and Barbudans

== See also ==
- Antigua (disambiguation)
- Barbudan (disambiguation)
