= Bayan, Republic of Buryatia =

Bayan Баян
- Selo
- Location within Republic of Buryatia Location within Russia
- Coordinates: 50°32′N 105°16′E
- Country: Russia
- Region: Republic of Buryatia
- District: Dzhidinsky District
- Time zone: UTC+8:00

Bayan (Russian: Баян) is a rural locality (a selo) in Dzhidinsky District, Republic of Buryatia, Russia. The population was 40 as of 2010. There are 2 streets.

== Geography ==
Bayan is located 12 km southwest of Petropavlovka (the district's administrative centre) by road. Bulyk is the nearest rural locality.
