= La Antigua, León =

La Antigua, Spain L'Antigua
- municipality
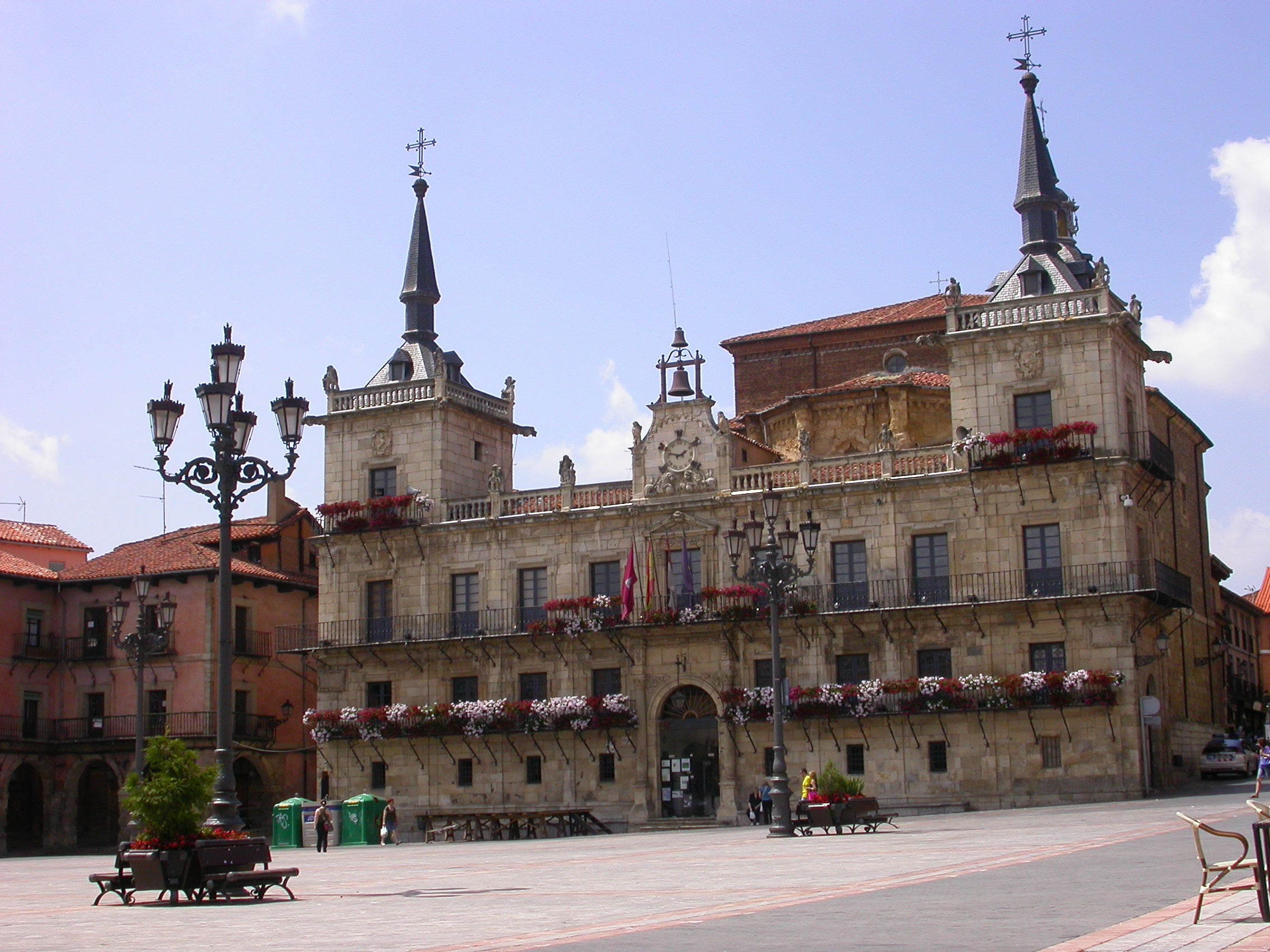
- Town hall

- Coat of arms

- Location within Spain
- Coordinates: 42°10′45″N 5°41′22″W
- Country: Spain
- Autonomous community: Castile and León
- Province: León
- Municipality: La Antigua

Government
  - Mayor: Carlos María Zotes Fierro (PP)

Area
  - Total: 54.70 km^{2} (21.12 sq mi)
- Elevation: 754 m (2,474 ft)

Population (2025-01-01)
  - Total: 324
  - Density: 5.92/km^{2} (15.3/sq mi)
- Time zone: UTC+1 (CET)
  - Summer (DST): UTC+2 (CEST)
- Postal Code: 24796
- Telephone prefix: 987

La Antigua (L'Antigua in Leonese language) (Spanish pronunciation: [la anˈtiɣwa]) is a municipality (pop. 606) in the province of León, Spain.
