= Bayan, Oghuz =

Bayan
- Municipality
- Location within Azerbaijan Location within Shaki-Zagatala Economic Region
- Coordinates: 41°01′32″N 47°26′45″E
- Country: Azerbaijan
- Rayon: Oghuz

Population
  - Total: 1,375
- Time zone: UTC+4 (AZT)
  - Summer (DST): UTC+5 (AZT)

Bayan is a village and municipality in the Oghuz Rayon of Azerbaijan. It has a population of 1,375.
