= Howard Park P.S. 218 =

Historic school building in Maryland, USA

- U.S. National Register of Historic Places
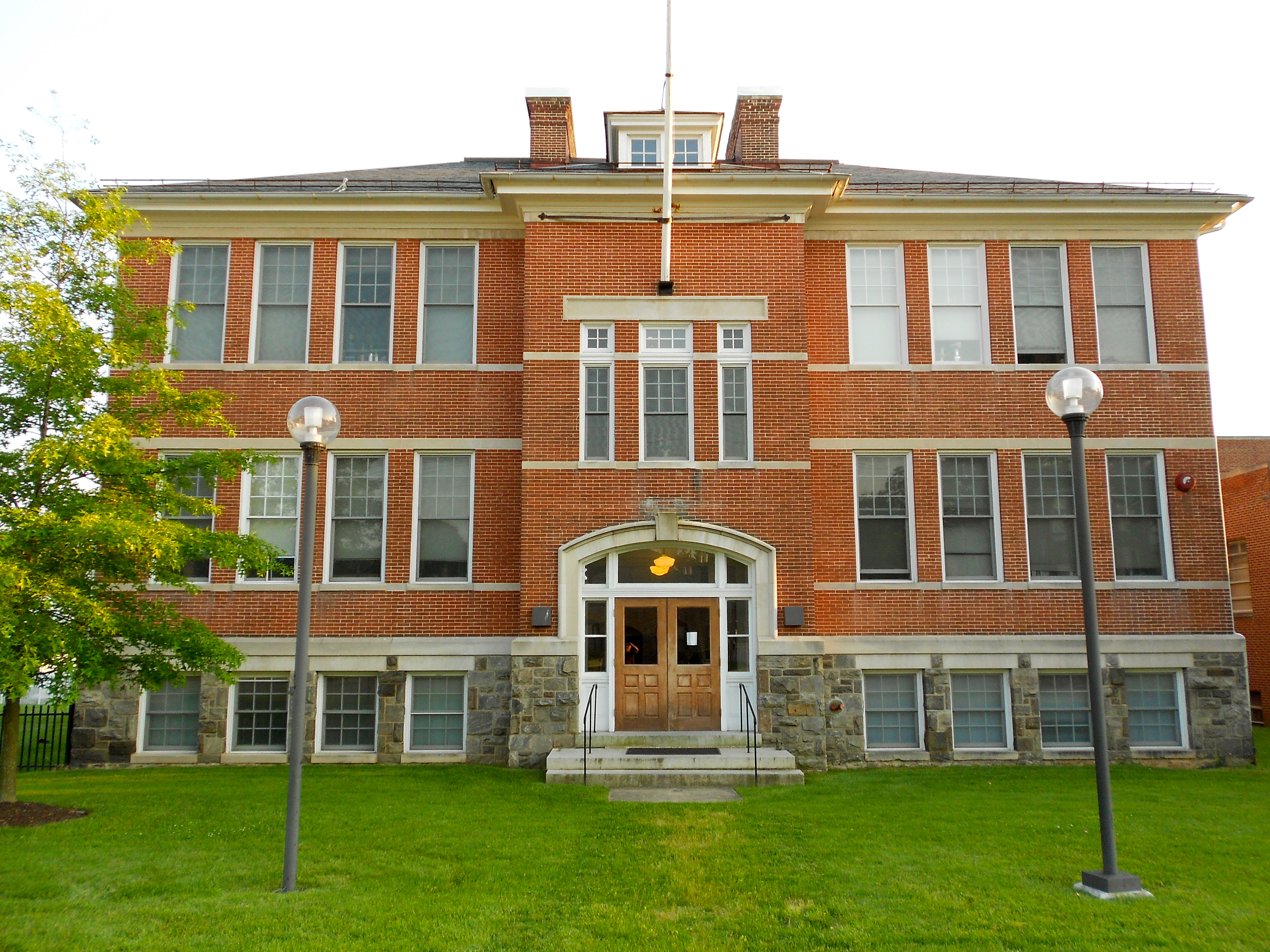

- Location within Baltimore Location within Maryland Location within the United States
- Location: 4801 Liberty Heights Ave., Baltimore, Maryland
- Coordinates: 39°19′53″N 76°41′54″W
- Area: 2.8 acres (1.1 ha)
- Built: 1908
- Architect: White, Lucius R. Jr.
- Architectural style: Classical Revival, Art Deco
- NRHP reference No.: 00001084
- Added to NRHP: September 27, 2000

Howard Park P.S. 218, also known as School 7, is a historic elementary school located at Baltimore, Maryland, United States. It is an early 20th-century brick school building located in the intact historic west Baltimore neighborhood of Howard Park. The earliest school building was constructed in 1908 and enlarged in 1913, 1936, and in 1957. The older sections are built of brick and accented with limestone details. It continued to function as a school until 1980.

Howard Park P.S. 218 was listed on the National Register of Historic Places in 2000.
