= Beyan, Fars =

Beyan بيان
- Village
- Location within Iran
- Coordinates: 30°27′11″N 53°10′12″E
- Country: Iran
- Province: Fars
- County: Khorrambid
- Bakhsh: Mashhad-e Morghab
- Rural District: Shahidabad

Population (2006)
  - Total: 66
- Time zone: UTC+3:30 (IRST)
  - Summer (DST): UTC+4:30 (IRDT)

Beyan (Persian: بيان, also Romanized as Beyān and Bayān; also known as Baigun, Qal‘eh Beig, Qal‘eh-ye Beyg, and Qal‘eh-ye Beyk) is a village in Shahidabad Rural District, Mashhad-e Morghab District, Khorrambid County, Fars province, Iran. At the 2006 census, its population was 66, in 23 families.
