= Bermudian cuisine =

Culinary traditions of Bermuda

Bermudian cuisine blends British and Portuguese cuisine with preparations of local seafood species, particularly wahoo and rockfish. Traditional dishes include codfish and potatoes served either with an add-on of hard-boiled egg and butter or olive oil sauce with a banana or in the Portuguese style with tomato-onion sauce, peas and rice. Hoppin' John, pawpaw casserole and fish chowder are also specialties of Bermuda. As most ingredients used in Bermuda's cuisine are imported, local dishes are offered with a global blend, with fish as the major ingredient, in any food eaten at any time.

== Main dishes ==
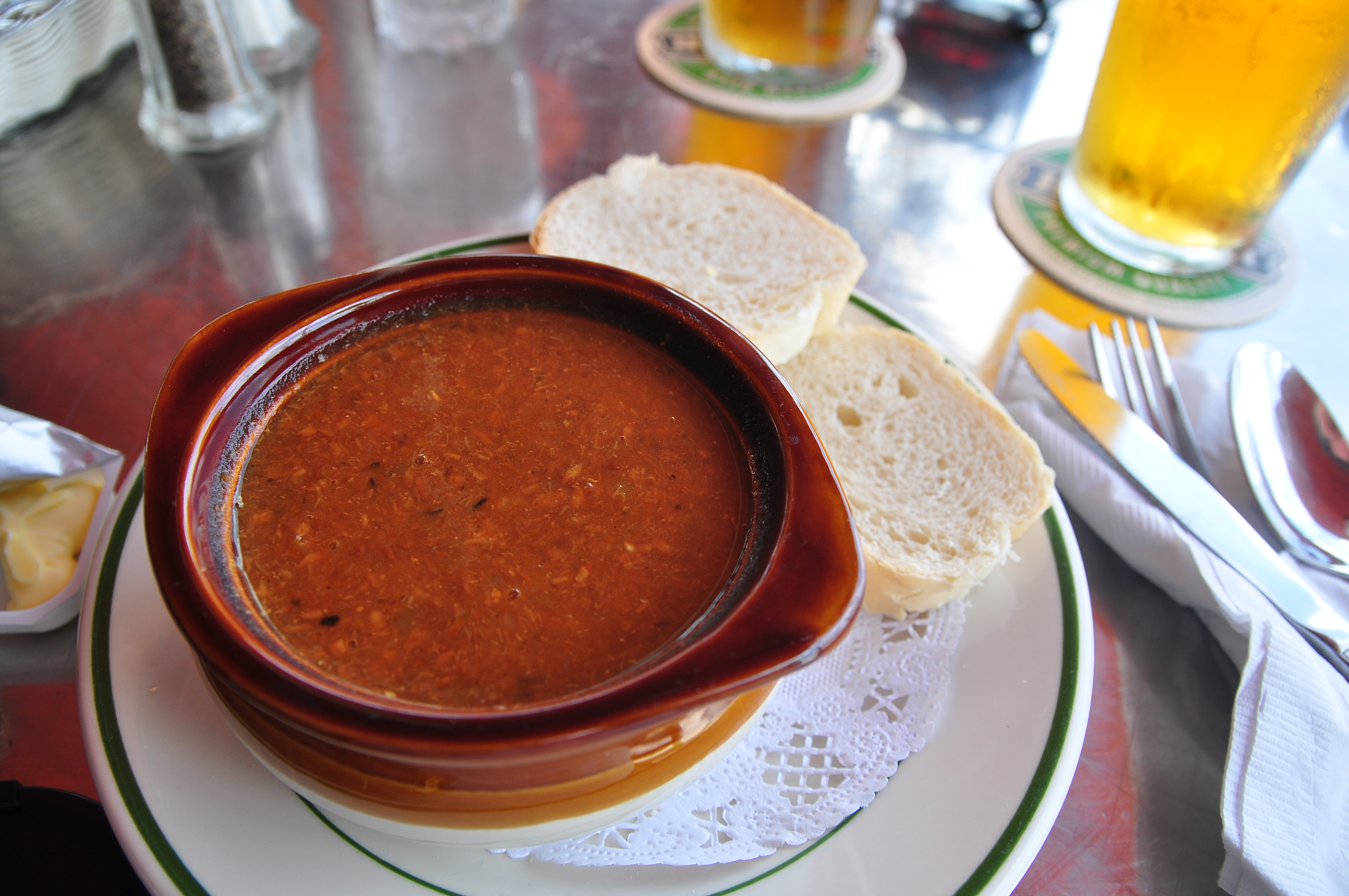
Bermuda fish chowder

There are several dishes served on Bermuda that are unique to the island which offer a taste of traditional Bermudian culture. Fish is one of the main ingredients in Bermudian cuisine. Local fish includes mahi mahi (also known as dolphinfish), snapper, spiny lobster (during September–March), tuna, and wahoo. These are used in dishes such as fish and chips, panfried fish, and boiled salted codfish and potato, a traditional dish in Bermuda (usually served on Sundays with tomato sauce and olive oil).

Bermuda fish chowder is considered a national dish, which is a staple food not only in restaurants and hotels but also in homes; the main ingredients are fish stock, fish, vegetables and bacon fat. It is served with spices, as well as black rum and sherry peppers. Beef stock is an essential ingredient in Bermudian fish chowder. Sherry pepper is prepared with ripe and very hot bird peppers using sherry for marinating it, and supplemented with herbs and spices; and black rum is rum derived by blackening with molasses in a special barrel for aging.

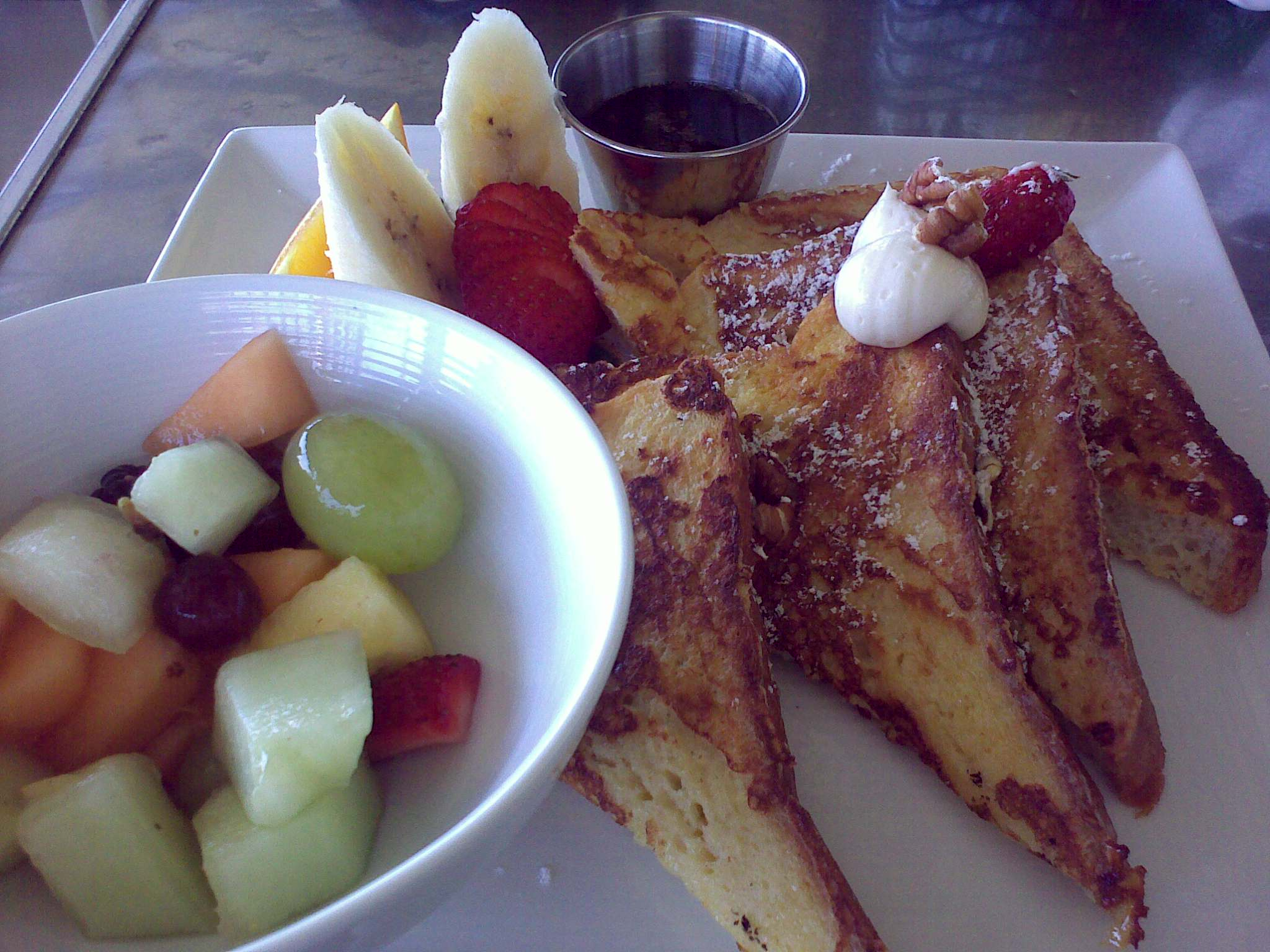
Brunch

The specialty in some restaurants during the weekend is a codfish brunch. It is a large serving of full blown codfish, boiled and steamed with salt, and with boiled potatoes, onions, and sliced bananas. The topping is a hard-boiled egg or tomato sauce, and occasionally avocado slices.

Appetizers served are shark hash and codfish cakes. Shark hash is minced shark meat, sautéed with spices, and served on toast. Codfish cake is made out of salted mashed cod, cooked potatoes and fresh thyme and parsley, formed into patties and pan-fried. It may be served with a topping of a "zesty fruit salsa and a side of mesclun salad" sandwiched in a white bun with mayonnaise.

== Fruits and vegetables ==
Almost every type of vegetable can be grown in Bermuda. Growers provide cabbage, celery, cucumbers, French beans, green peas, carrots, parsnips, radishes, and turnips for local tables. Flax, capsicums and peppers are also locally grown and incorporated in local cuisine. English onions arrived in Bermuda around 1616 where they became known as Bermuda onions. Bermudians make use of the abundance of locally grown fruits in fruit salads, incorporating strawberries, loquats, grapefruit, watermelon, papaya, cassava, and Suriname cherries.

For vegetarians, the choice is very limited to dishes prepared with fresh Bermuda carrots, onions, potatoes, and green beans but without any meat.

== Breads and desserts ==
Corn bread, originating in Mexico, and sweet Easter bread, originating in the British West Indies, are incorporated into menus. Bananas are versatile in local cuisine, and may be used to make banana crumble and desserts made from strawberries and cherries, fried as fritters, or flamed in rum. Desserts with bananas are also baked in rum and brown sugar. Jelly-roll or sponge cake, served with peaches or strawberries, bananas, custard, chopped nuts, and whipped cream and soaked in sherry is also a common dessert. Another notable Bermudian dessert is the restaurant Fresco's chocolate mousse cake, which is served hot with roasted almonds, toffee, marshmallow ice cream, and pistachio creme.

== Holidays and festivals ==
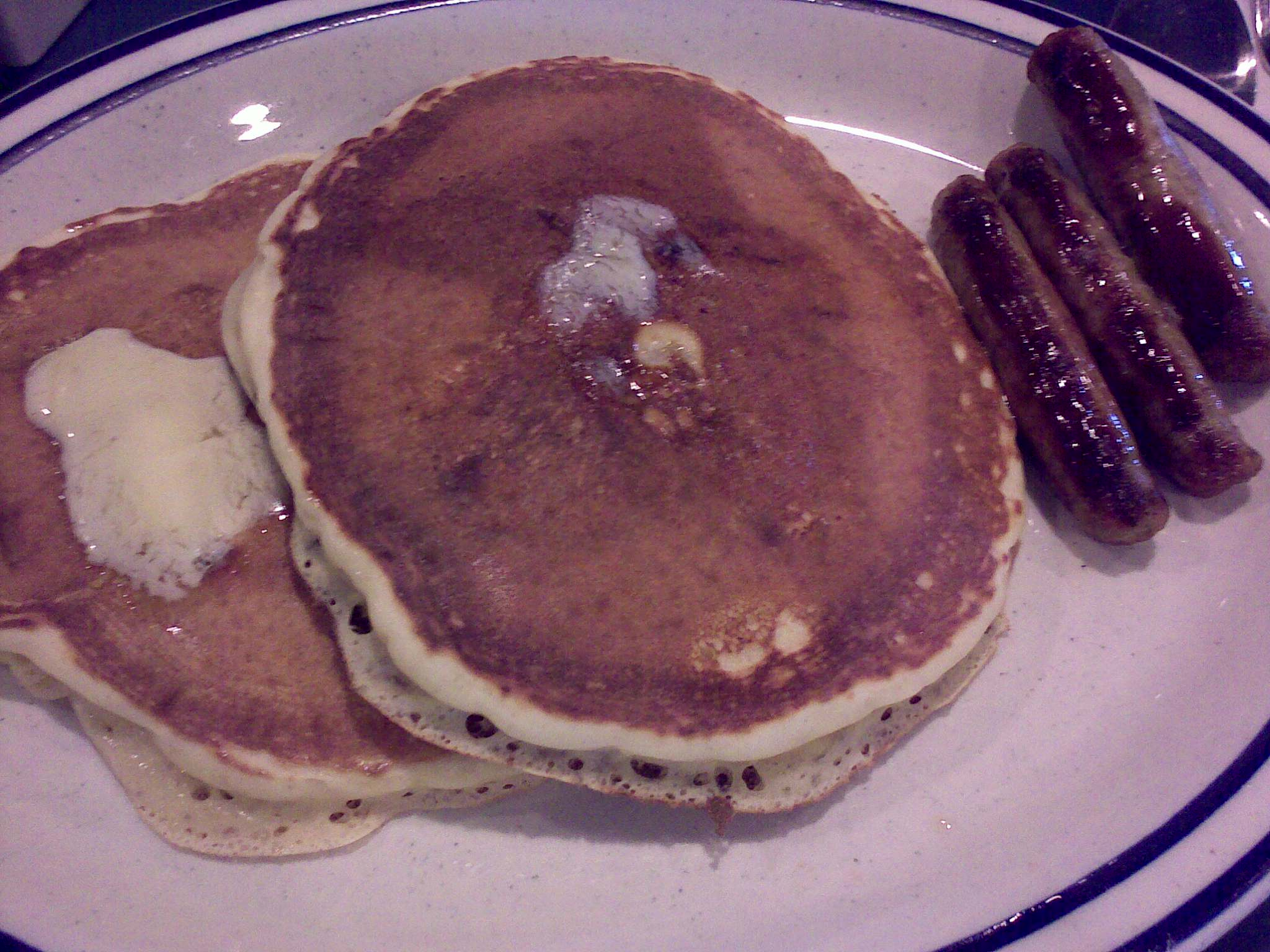
Bermuda banana cakes

Sweet potato pudding makes use of cinnamon, cloves, and lemon or orange juice, and is especially popular on Guy Fawkes Night. Hot cross buns with codfish cakes are a Good Friday fare. Dating to 1612, cassava pie is a Christmas dinner specialty, combining chicken or pork with eggs, brandy and sweet pastry. However, this dish is now offered as a side dish in restaurants on any day. Though every Bermudian family follows its individual recipe, cassava pie includes grated cassava, butters, eggs, salt and sugar. While beef and pork were initially added to chicken for the pie filling, beef and pork are no longer favored. Mussel pie is also a common dish. Its ingredients are shelled mussels, potatoes, and onions. It is served baked and seasoned with thyme, parsley, and curry. Bermuda's Culinary Arts Festival occurs in November and features celebrity seminars as well as gourmet food demonstrations and tastings.
