= SS Manticos =

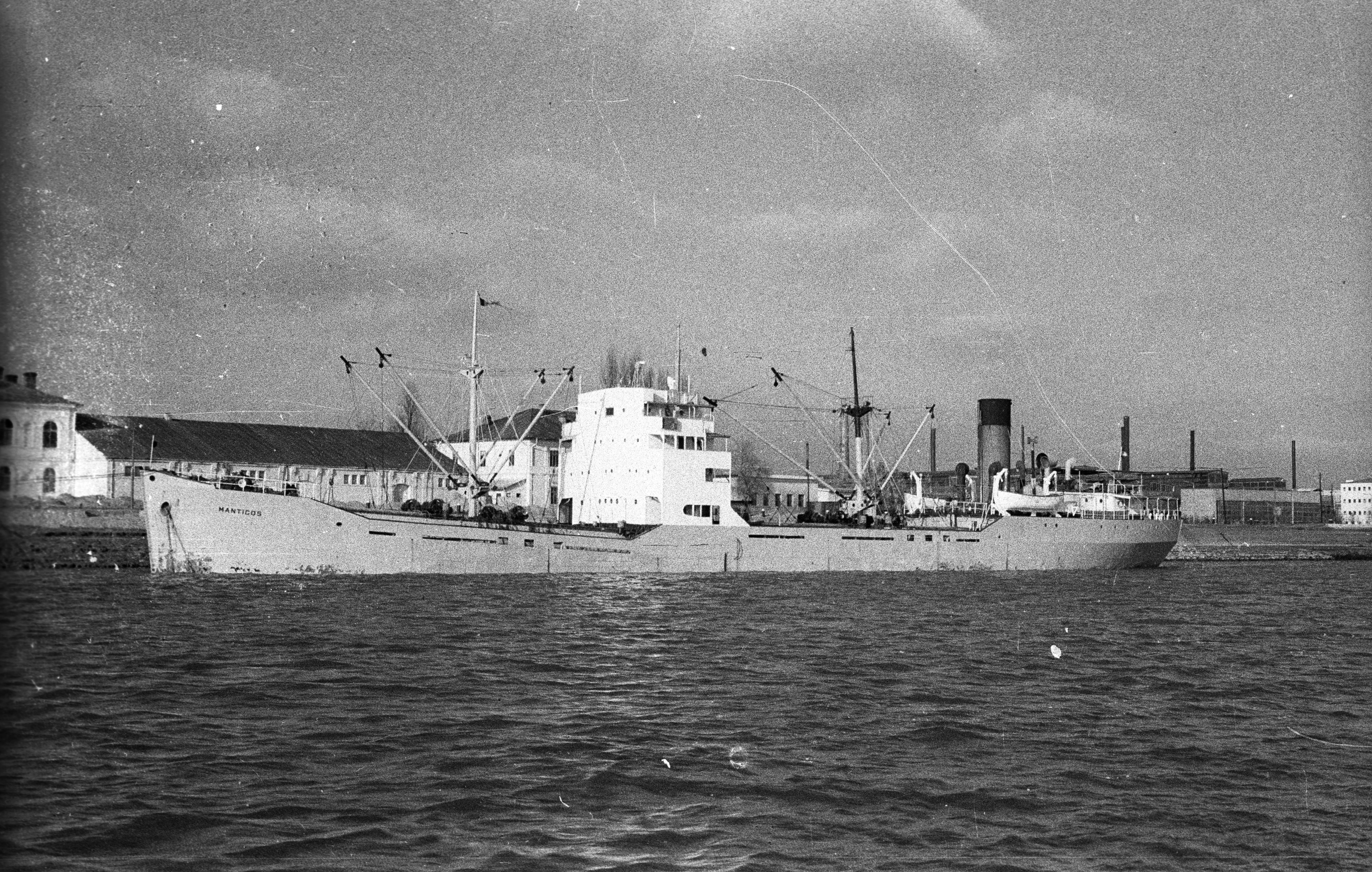
- The ship as Manticos in 1961, at Galați on the Danube in Romania

History
- Name: Empire Barbados (1944–48); Tennyson (1948–50); Berylstone (1950–60); Manticos (1960–63)
- Owner: Ministry of War Transport (1944–48); Rodney Steamship Co Ltd (1948–50); T Stone (Shipping) Ltd (1950–60); Comp Nav Zannis (1960–63)
- Operator: Joseph Constantine SS Line Ltd (1945–48); Anglo-Danubian Shipping Co (1948–50); Stone & Rolfe Ltd, Swansea (1950–60); A Halcoussis & Co, Greece (1960–63)
- Port of registry: (United Kingdom) West Hartlepool (1945–48); (United Kingdom) London (1948–50); (United Kingdom) Llanelly (1950–60); (Lebanon) Beirut (1960–63)
- Builder: William Gray & Company, West Hartlepool
- Yard number: 1178
- Launched: 28 December 1944
- Completed: March 1945
- Identification: UK official number 180081 (1944–60); call sign GFDX (1944–60); IMO number: 5219759
- Fate: Foundered on 22 October 1963

General characteristics
- Class & type: Empire Malta
- Tonnage: 3,538 GRT, 2,259 NRT, 4,310 DWT
- Length: 315.5 ft (96.2 m)
- Beam: 46.5 ft (14.2 m)
- Depth: 22.1 ft (6.7 m)
- Propulsion: single screw; triple expansion engine
- Capacity: 250,700 cubic feet (7,100 m^{3}) cargo space, 1 × 80 ton derrick, 1 x 50 ton derrick, 8 x 3 ton derricks
- Sensors & processing systems: wireless direction finding

Location of the sinking of Manticos off Guinea-Bissau.

Manticos was a heavy lift steamship that William Gray & Company built in West Hartlepool in 1944 as Empire Barbados for the Ministry of War Transport (MoWT). In 1948 she was sold and renamed Tennyson. She was sold again in 1950 and renamed Berylstone and in 1960 was again sold and renamed Manticos. On 8 October 1963 she developed a leak, and despite efforts to save her she sank on 22 October 1963.

== Building, registration and identification ==
Between the beginning of 1944 and autumn of 1945, William Gray & Co Ltd at West Hartlepool built a set of ten ships for the MoWT to a standard design of "Scandinavian type cargo ship" called the Empire Malta class. Empire Barbados was one of this set.

She was launched on 28 December 1944 and completed in March 1945. Her registered length was 315.5 ft (96.2 m), her beam was 46.5 ft (14.2 m) and her depth was 22.1 ft (6.7 m). Her tonnages were 3,538 GRT and 2,259 NRT. She had a three-cylinder triple expansion engine, built by the Central Marine Engine Works of West Hartlepool.

Empire Barbados was registered at West Hartlepool. Her UK official number was 180081 and her call sign was GFDX. Later in her career she had the IMO number 5219759.

== Ownership, management, and names ==
The MoWT initially contracted the Joseph Constantine Steamship Line Ltd to manage Empire Barbados. In 1946, management passed to the Rodney Steamship Co Ltd of London. In 1948 the Rodney Steamship Co Ltd acquired her, renamed her Tennyson, registered her in London, and contracted the Anglo-Danubian Transport Co Ltd of London to manage her.

In 1950, T Stone (Shipping) Ltd acquired Tennyson, renamed her Berylstone, registered her in Llanelly and contracted Stone & Rolfe Ltd of Swansea to manage her. On 14 September 1951, three Soviet aircraft bombed Berylstone off Arkhangelsk.

In 1960 Compagnia Navigazione Zannis acquired Berylstone, renamed her Manticos, registered her in Beirut in Lebanon, and contracted A Halcoussis & Co to manage her.

== Loss ==
On 8 October 1963, Manticos was en route from Libreville, Gabon bound for the Mediterranean with a cargo of logs when she developed a leak. She was beached some 210 nautical miles (390 km) south of Dakar, Senegal (11°14′N 16°32′W). On 16 October, a tug was alongside, assisting with pumping operations but on 22 October the leak increased and the stern section of Manticos submerged. The ship was declared a total loss.
