= Shamiekh Holding Group =

Conglomerate based in Riyadh, Saudi Arabia

- Native name: مجموعة شامخ القابضة
- Formerly: Al Bayan Holding Group
- Type: Conglomerate
- Founded: 1980; 46 years ago
- Headquarters: Sulaiman Al Hamdan Street, as-Sulimaniyah, Riyadh 11551, Saudi Arabia
- Area served: Saudi Arabia; Kuwait
- Key people: Mohammad Al Hammad.
- Website: shamiekh.com.sa

Shamiekh Holding Group (Arabic: مجموعة شامخ القابضة), formerly Al Bayan Holding Group (Arabic: مجموعة البيان القابضة) is a Saudi-based business conglomerate headquartered in Riyadh, Saudi Arabia. Its subsidiaries provide real estate development and management, information and telecommunications, printing and packaging, logistics and supply and trading.

== History ==
In 2005, the group signed a commercial advertising deal with Minister Iyad bin Amin Madani of the Saudi Ministry of Culture and Information.

In 2012, the administration of King Abdullah Al Saud authorized the group to organize the annual Al Jenadriyah festival in Riyadh.

In 2013, the then-Governor of Riyadh, Prince Khalid bin Bandar bin Abdulaziz Al Saud, awarded Al Hammad to the DNGO Contracting Company, one of the entities of the group, for a project of strengthening of water resources in Riyadh.
