= Bajan (surname) =

Bajan is a surname. It may refer to:

- Artúr Baján (1888–1969), Hungarian rower
- Jerzy Bajan (1901–1967), Polish aviator
- Marek Bajan (born 1956), Polish pentathlete
- Robert Băjan (born 1995), Romanian footballer
