= Bayani, Afghanistan =

Bayani بایانی
- Location in Afghanistan
- Coordinates: 35°11′48″N 67°47′05″E
- Country: Afghanistan
- Province: Bamyan
- Time zone: + 4.30

Bayani (Persian: بایانی) is a village in Bamyan Province in northern-central Afghanistan.

== See also ==
- Bamyan Province
