= Demographics of the British Empire =

By 1913, the British Empire held sway over 412 million people, 23% of the world population at the time.

== Population ==
Territorial population distribution of the British Empire (1925)
1. British India (71.0%)
2. British Africa (10.7%)
3. United Kingdom (10.5%)
4. Other Asian colonies (2.98%)
5. British North America (2.01%)
6. Australasia and Pacific (1.69%)
7. Other colonies (1.10%)

The following table gives the population of the British Empire and its territories, in several different time periods. The most populous territory in the empire was British India, which included what are now Pakistan and Bangladesh.

Territories	1814	1881	1901	1913	1925
United Kingdom	16,456,303	34,884,848	41,458,721	45,649,000	47,307,000
British India	40,058,408	253,896,330	294,361,056	303,700,000	318,942,000
British Africa	128,977	1,526,110	43,000,000	52,000,000	47,993,000
Other Asian colonies	2,009,005	3,347,770	5,638,944	26,300,000	13,373,000
British North America	486,146	4,522,145	5,600,000	18,000,000	9,047,000
Australasia and Pacific	434,882	2,837,081	5,486,000	18,000,000	7,603,000
European dependencies	180,300	359,403	650,000	18,000,000	656,000
British West Indies	732,171	1,216,409	2,012,655	1,600,000	2,012,000
Total British Empire	61,157,433	305,512,568	400,000,000	447,249,000	449,223,000
World population (approx.)	~1.0 billion	~1.4 billion	~1.7 billion	~1.8 billion	~2.0 billion
British Empire percentage	~6%	~21%	~24%	~25%	~22%

== Ethnicity ==
The empire's population was classified into white people, also referred to as Europeans, and non-white people, variously referred to as persons of color, negros and natives. The largest ethnic grouping in the empire was Indians (including what are now Pakistanis and Bangladeshis), who were classified into 118 groups on the basis of language which were amalgamated into seven "principle groups". The following table gives the population figures for white people and non-white people, in the empire and its territories, in 1814 and 1901.

Territories	1814				1901			
Territories	White people	Non-white people	White %	Non-white%	White people	Non-white people	White %	Non-white%
United Kingdom and home dependencies	16,636,606	?	100%	0%	41,608,791	?	100%	0%
British India	25,246	40,033,162	0.06%	99.94%	50,481	294,191,379	0.05%	99.95%
British Africa	20,678	108,299	16.03%	83.97%	1,000,000	33,499,329	2.90%	97.10%
Other Asian colonies	61,059	1,947,946	3.04%	96.96%	?	5,144,954	0%	100%
British North America	486,146	?	100%	0%	5,500,000	100,000	98.21%	1.79%
Australasia and Pacific	35,829	399,053	8.24%	91.76%	4,662,000	824,000	84.98%	15.02%
British West Indies	64,994	667,177	8.87%	91.13%	100,000	1,912,655	4.97%	95.03%
Total British Empire	18,001,796	43,155,637	29.43%	70.57%	53,040,468	335,672,317	13.64%	86.36%

== Religion ==
The British authorities were primarily Protestant Christians throughout the history of the Empire.

Religion in the British Empire (1901)
Territory	Percent
Hinduism	52.4%
Islam	23.7%
Christianity	14.6%
Buddhism	3%
Paganism and others	6.3%
Population distribution of religions in the British Empire (1901)

The following table gives the population figures for the religions in the British Empire in 1901. The most populous religion in the empire was Hinduism, followed by Islam.

Religion	Population	% of total population
Hinduism	208,000,000	52.4
Islam	94,000,000	23.7
Christianity	58,000,000	14.6
Buddhism	12,000,000	3
Paganism and others	25,000,000	6.3
Total British Empire	397,000,000	100

== See also ==
- Economy of the British Empire
- Territorial evolution of the British Empire
