= Bayan, Sistan and Baluchestan =

Bayan بايان
- Village
- Location within Iran
- Coordinates: 28°19′21″N 61°26′15″E
- Country: Iran
- Province: Sistan and Baluchestan
- County: Mirjaveh
- Bakhsh: Central
- Rural District: Ladiz

Population (2006)
  - Total: 27
- Time zone: UTC+3:30 (IRST)
  - Summer (DST): UTC+4:30 (IRDT)

Bayan (Persian: بايان, also Romanized as Bāyān; also known as Beyān) is a village in Ladiz Rural District, in the Central District of Mirjaveh County, Sistan and Baluchestan Province, Iran. At the 2006 census, its population was 27, in 4 families.
