= HMS Antigua (1757) =

British Royal Navy 14-gun brig-sloop

History

United Kingdom
- Name: HMS Antigua
- Namesake: Antigua, an island in the West Indies
- Acquired: 4 June 1757
- Fate: Sold 13 August 1763

General characteristics
- Type: Brig-sloop
- Tons burthen: 157 BM
- Length: 71 ft 6 in (21.79 m)
- Beam: 23 ft 6 in (7.16 m)
- Armament: 14 guns

The first HMS Antigua was a 14-gun brig-sloop that served in the British Royal Navy from 1757 to 1763.

Antigua had served as a privateer before the Royal Navy purchased her on 4 June 1757. She was sold in the West Indies on 13 August 1763.

The sloop brought the French privateer Marie-Catherine into St. John's, Antigua, on 24 March 1758. The Antigua had captured the Marie-Catherine with the aid of privateers. The French crew threw its 8 carriage guns and 8 swivel guns overboard during the pursuit. The Antigua recaptured a British schooner that was departing Dutch Suriname days later. The schooner, loaded with sugar and molasses, was sent into English Harbor. Months later, the Antigua captured a 10-gun French privateer on 1 May after a "smart engagement" in which the French suffered several casualties. The prize was brought into St. John's. The Antigua captured a 10-gun French privateer in the Atlantic in June 1758 after a battle that lasted for several hours. The prize was brought into Philadelphia harbor. In July, the Antigua was attacked while sailing from Barbados on the windward side of Martinique by a 16-gun French privateer. The two ships exchanged fire until two more French privateers arrived and the Antigua broke off the engagement and safely reached English Harbour. On 6 November, the Antigua brought a 5-gun French privateer and its 24-man crew into St. John's. The Antigua, under commander Weston Varlo, engaged a 12-gun French privateer off the windward coast of its namesake island on 11 December. The battle lasted for a half hour and resulted in the capture of the French ship, with 5 privateers killed and 9 wounded.

The Antigua started 1759 with much activity. On 7 January, the ship spotted the merchant ship Nancy from Bristol being captured by two privateers off of Wiloughby Bay. Varlo signaled HMS Spy in English Harbour and the two Royal Navy ships sailed after the French ships and their prize. The two privateers left their prize to be recaptured by the Antigua and Spy, abandoning a prize crew that had taken control of the Nancy. Six days later, the Antigua brought in a 6-gun French privateer. Another privateer, a sloop loaded with beef and wine, was captured on 23 January while it was en route from Sint Eustatius to Martinique. In October 1759, the Antigua recaptured the sloop George, a New London-based vessel that had been taken by a French privateer. The sloop captured an additional 4 ships in November, bringing 3 ships engaged in the Dutch-French Caribbean trade and a 6-gun French privateer sloop into St. John's, Antigua.
