= Barbadian =

Barbadian may refer to:

- anything related to Barbados
- Barbadians, people from Barbados or of Barbadian descent
  - Afro-Barbadians
  - Barbadian Americans
  - Barbadian Brazilians
  - Barbadian British
  - Barbadian Canadians
  - White Barbadian
- Culture of Barbados
- Cuisine of Barbados
- English in Barbados

== See also ==
- List of Barbadians
- Bajan (disambiguation)
