= Dr. Howard A. Kelly Park =

Park in Orange County, Florida, United States

Coordinates: 28.761°N 81.503°W

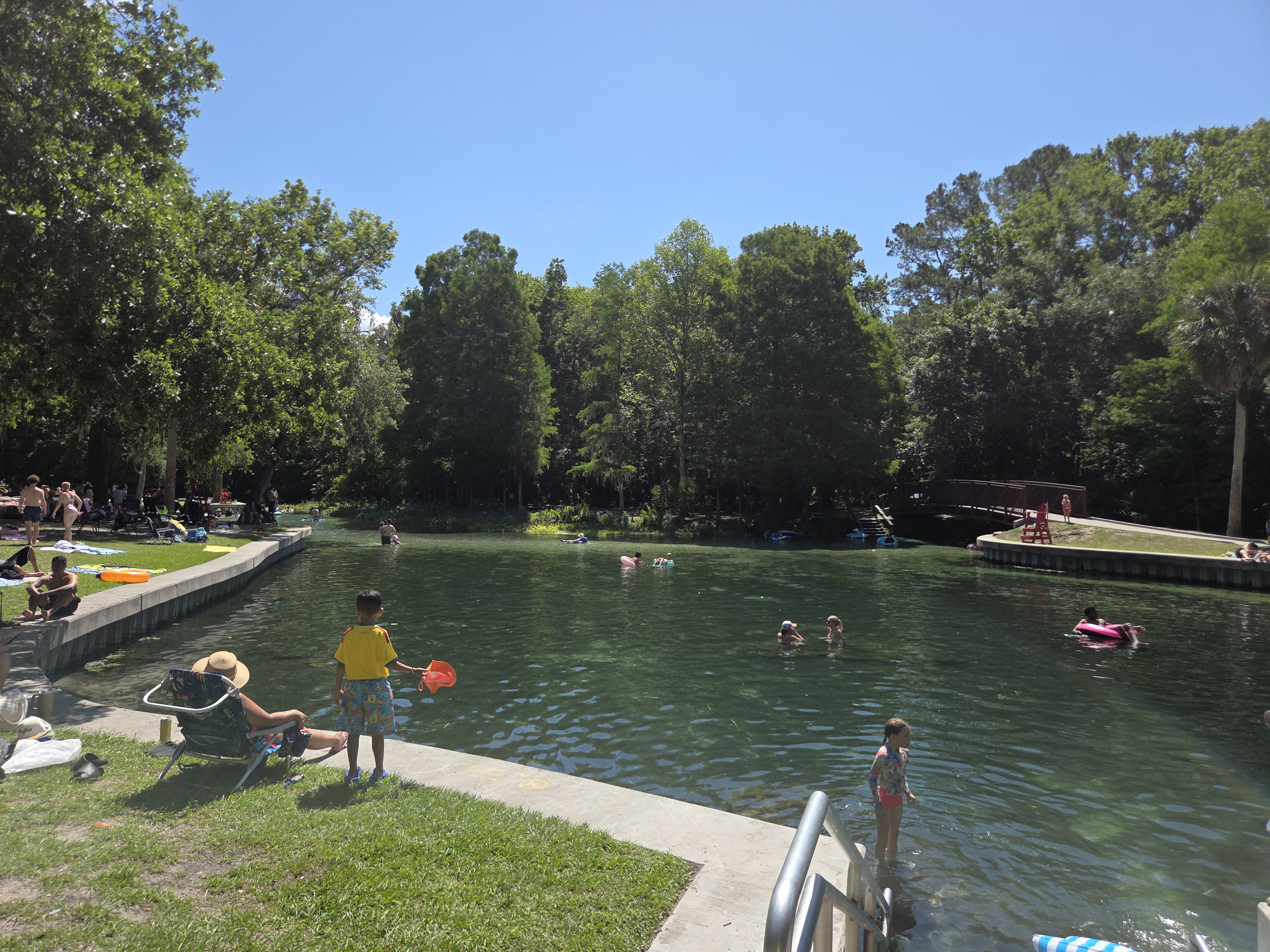
The main swimming basin at Kelly Park

Dr. Howard A. Kelly Park, often called Kelly Park, is a protected area which is owned by Orange County, Florida. It was created after Howard Atwood Kelly, one of the founders of Johns Hopkins University, donated the land to the county.

== History ==
Before European settlement, the area was inhabited by the Timucua. The area around Rock Springs was gifted to William S. Delk in 1855 by Florida. The land would be used for lumbering while the river would power mills and cotton gins. In 1927, Howard Atwood Kelly donated the land to Orange County on the condition that it would be used as a public park. Kelly initially bought the land to prevent it being used as a limestone quarry.

In 2016, the park was given a state historic marker, which was attended by the grandson of Kelly.

== Geography ==
Kelly Park spans 355 acres (144 ha). Within Kelly Park is Rock Springs and Rock Springs Run.

== Hydrology ==
The water of the park is consistently 68 °F (20 °C).
