= Howard Park, Kilmarnock =

Park in Kilmarnock, East Ayrshire, Scotland

Coordinates: 55°36′13″N 4°30′07″W

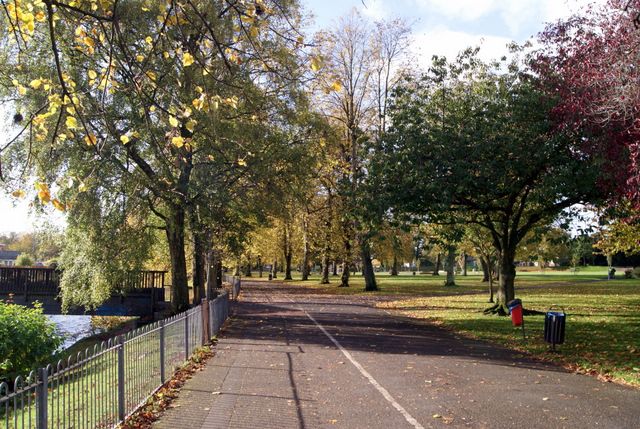
Howard Park in 2010

Howard Park is a public park in Kilmarnock, East Ayrshire, Scotland. It was previously known as Barbadoes Green. The roots of Kilmarnock Football Club may be traced back to the park.

Lady's Walk in the park commemorates the grief-stricken walks taken by the young widow of the Earl of Kilmarnock, who was sentenced to be hanged, drawn and quartered in London in 1746. His sentence was later commuted to beheading, and his widow died a year after his execution.

The land on which Howard Park is situated was given to Kilmarnock by the Howard De Walden family. It is a medium-sized park; other parks in the area, such as Kay Park, are much larger. Nearby is the site of the Saxone shoe factory, formerly on Titchfield Street; the factory was replaced by the Galleon Leisure Centre in 1986. The Centre, in turn, replaced the Corporation Baths (which had been open since 1940).

In October 2009, the play area in the park (which incorporated a variety of roundabouts, swings, climbing frames and sandboxes) was renovated. The old, fenced-off play park was removed and replaced with a modern, larger park extending into the old football field in the centre of the park

There is a bicycle path around the park, suitable for cyclists of all ages. Three parallel bridges connect the park to other areas of Kilmarnock, crossing the River Irvine. On one side of the park is a long hill, which slopes down to the central area of the park and the play area. The park is surrounded by a residential area, it has a variety of playground equipment and a new sport/exercise area.
