= Barbados passport =

Travel document

- Barbados passport front cover
- Type: Passport
- Issued by: Barbados
- Purpose: Identification
- Eligibility: Barbadian citizenship
- Expiration: 10 years after issuance for individuals aged 16 and above; 5 years for citizens from the age of 5–15

A Barbados passport is a travel document issued to citizens of Barbados, in accordance with Citizenship Act (CAP. 186) from 1978, the Immigration Act (CAP. 190) from 1997, and the Barbados Constitution, for the purpose of facilitating international travel. It allows the bearer to travel to foreign countries in accordance with visa requirements, and facilitates the process of securing assistance from Barbados consular officials abroad, if necessary.

A Barbados passport is a document for valid proof of citizenship. The passport is also a Caricom passport, as Barbados is a member of the Caribbean Community. There are three types of passport booklets: regular, service, or diplomatic passports. Despite the placement of the Caribbean Community (CARICOM) logo at the top of the document's cover-page, Barbados passports are issued by the Immigration Department under the auspices of the Office of the Prime Minister, and at the Diplomatic Missions and Honorary Consulates of Barbados abroad.

As of 2026 only 44 nations globally require Barbadian passport holders to file for an entry visa.

== Types of passports ==
Regular
Barbados citizens are eligible to apply for a passport. A passport for a person under 16 years of age is valid for five years; a passport for persons 16 years and above is valid for ten years.

== Application ==
All applicants aged 16 or above are entitled to apply for a standard Barbados passport. Minors aged 15 and below may remain on their parent's passport.

Passport fees (Effective 1 December 2010)

Standard

- Adult's passport, $150
- Minor's passport, $100

Business

- Business persons' passport, $225

Barbados passports may also be issued outside Barbados, for which fees vary per country.

== Format ==
- Paper size B7 (ISO/IEC 7810 ID-3, 88 mm × 125 mm)
- 32 pages (passports with more pages can be issued to frequent travellers)

=== Cover ===
Barbados passports are dark blue in colour, with logo of CARICOM and the words CARIBBEAN COMMUNITY followed by BARBADOS inscribed on top of the booklet. The Barbados coat of arms is prominently emblazoned in the centre of the cover page, followed on the bottom by the inscription of the words PASSPORT on ordinary passports, and DIPLOMATIC PASSPORT on diplomatic passports. Underneath that is the international biometric symbol.

=== Identification page ===
The following information is printed on the identification page, in: English, French, and Spanish.

1. Photo of Passport Holder	2. Type (PR for passport)
3. Code of Issuing State (BRB)	4. Passport Number
5. Surname	6. Given name(s)
7. Nationality (Barbados citizenship)	8. Date of birth
9. National Identification Number	10. Sex
10. Place of birth	11. Holder's signature
12. Date of issue	13. Date of expiry
14. Issuing authority

=== Passport photographs ===
The standards are:

- 5 cm × 5 cm (2.0 in × 2.0 in)
- Front view, full face, open eyes, closed mouth, and natural expression
- Full head from top of hair to shoulders
- White background
- No shadows on face or in background
- No sunglasses; face obstructions, or hats
- Normal contrast and lighting

== Passport statement ==
Barbados passports contain on their inside cover the following words in English only:

=== Current version ===
In November 2021 the Barbados government transformed to a republican form of government. Following the change there were some changes made to the passport.

These are to request and require in the name of the President of Barbados all those whom it may concern to allow the bearer to pass freely without let or hindrance and to afford him or her every assistance and protection of which he or she may stand in need.

=== Commonwealth realm version ===
These are to request and require in the name of the Governor-General of Barbados all those whom it may concern to allow the bearer to pass freely without let or hindrance and to afford him or her every assistance and protection of which he or she may stand in need.

=== 1960s colonial version ===
The Governor of Barbados requests and requires in the Name of Her Majesty all those whom it may concern to allow the bearer to pass freely without let or hindrance, and to afford the bearer such assistance and protection as may be necessary.

== Visa requirements for Barbadian citizens ==
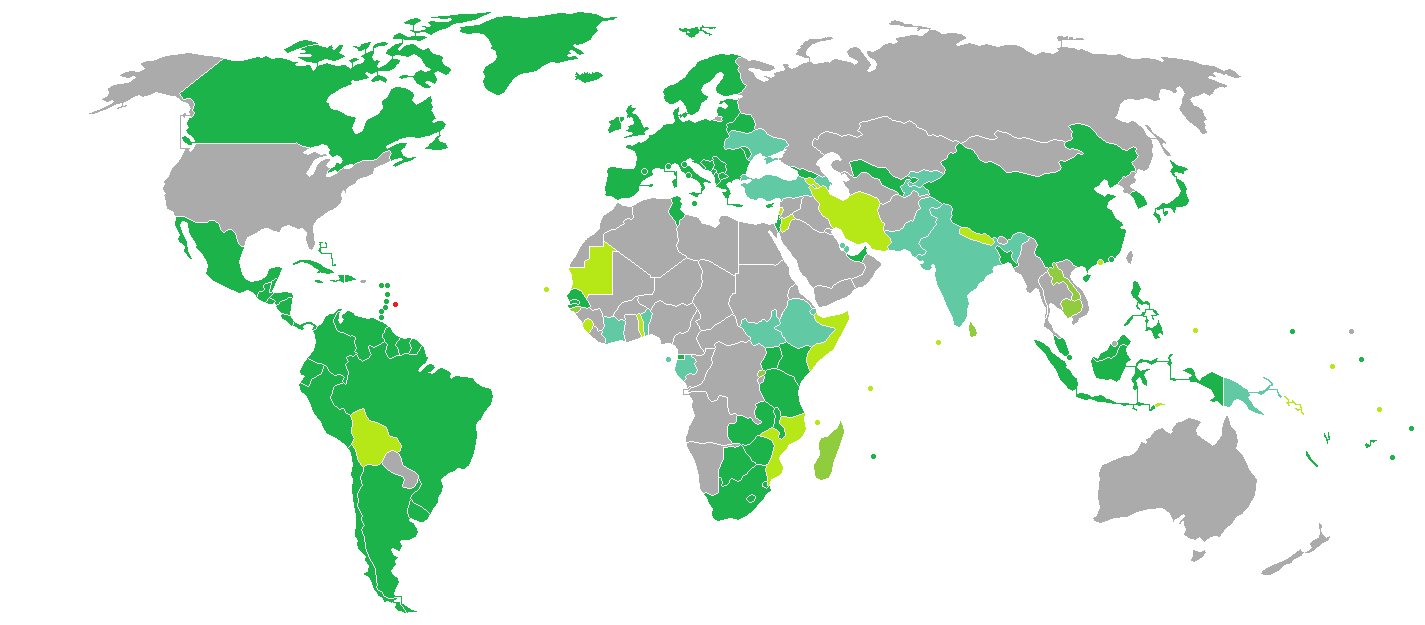
Visa requirements for Barbadian citizens Barbados Visa free access Visa on arrival eVisa Visa available both on arrival or online Visa required

As of 2025, Barbadian citizens have visa-free or visa on arrival access to 165 countries and territories, ranking the Barbadian passport 21st in terms of travel freedom according to the Henley Passport Index. The Barbados passport ranks 1st among CARICOM passport holders that enjoy travel freedom and visa-free access.

Holders of a Barbados passport may travel without a visa, or receive a visa upon arrival, to many other countries. As of 28 May 2009, Barbados signed a short-stay visa waiver agreement with the European Union. The agreement allows citizens of Barbados to visit the countries of Europe who are members of the Schengen Area for up to three months in any six-month period without a visa. Similarly, citizens of Europe (who countries are members of the Schengen Area) will be able to visit Barbados for the same period without a visa.

=== Caribbean ===
- Visa policy toward Barbadians in the region
  - British
  - Dutch
  - French

== Gallery of historical images ==
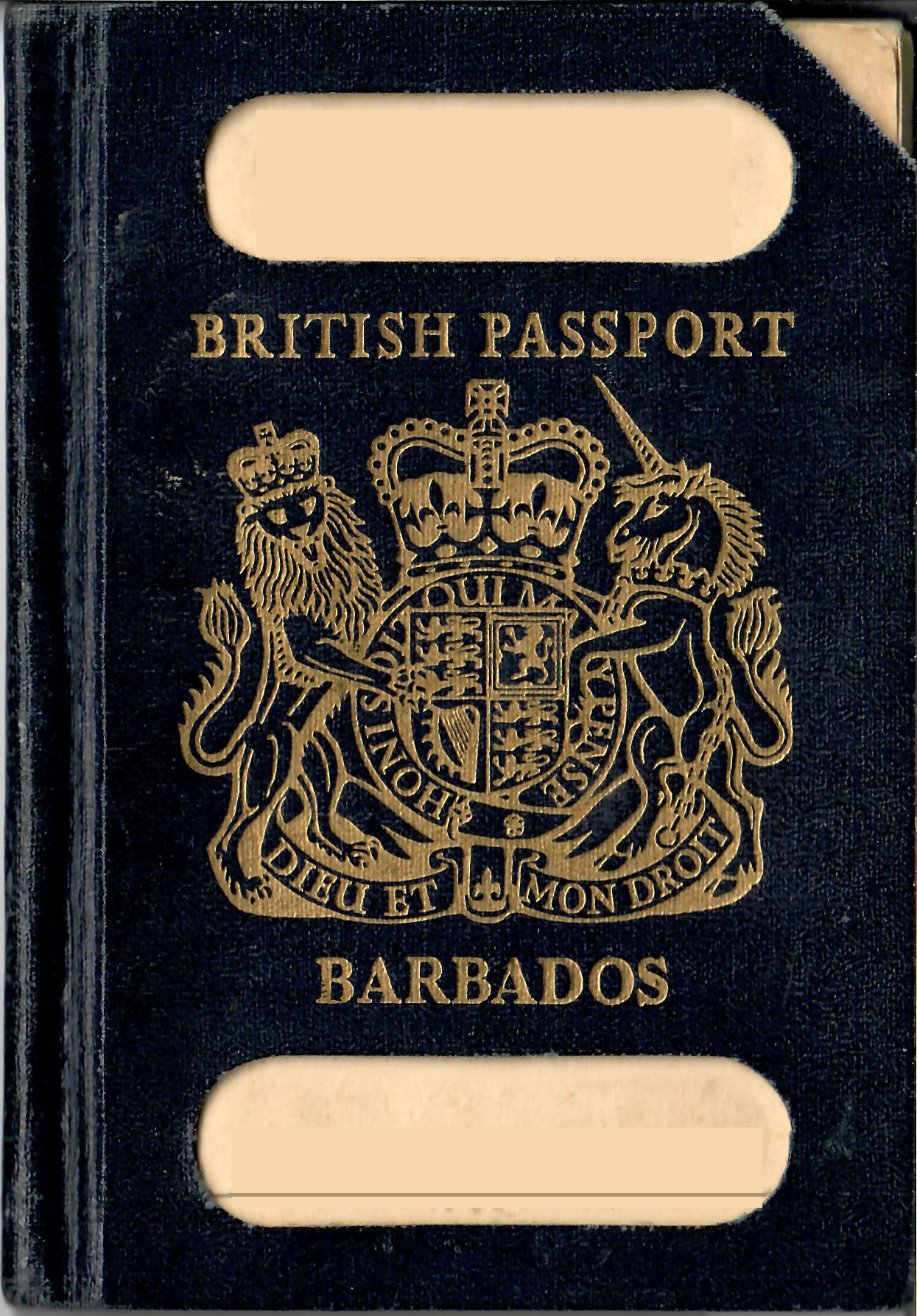
A Barbadian passport as issued for Citizens of the United Kingdom and Colonies in the 1960s.

Caribbean Community Barbados Passport with international bio-metric symbol as issued after 2018 with republican variant in picture issued after 2021.

== See also ==
- Visa requirements for Barbadian citizens
- Henley & Partners Visa Restrictions Index
- Visa Policy of Barbados
- Government of Barbados
- Commonwealth citizen
- Barbados nationality law
- Foreign relations of Barbados
- CARICOM passport
