= Caribbean Brazilians =

Caribbean Brazilians Caraíba-brasileiro
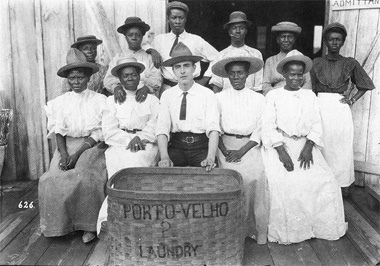
- Barbadian workers in Porto Velho, c.1900

Total population
- c. Unknown

Regions with significant populations
- Brazil: Mainly Northern Brazil

Languages
- Portuguese, Haitian Creole and many others

Religion
- Predominantly Roman Catholicism. Minorities practise African diasporic religions, are Irreligious or have another faiths

Related ethnic groups
- British African-Caribbeans, West Indian Americans, Caribbean Australians, Black Canadians, Afro-Brazilians, Barbadian Brazilians

Caribbean Brazilians (Portuguese: Caraíba-brasileiro, Caribenho brasileiro) refers to Brazilians of full, partial, or predominantly Caribbean ancestry, or Caribbean-born people residing in Brazil. Many Caribbean Brazilians are of Barbadian descent.

== Migration history ==
During the rubber boom in the Brazilian Amazon, between 1880 and 1912, the construction of a railroad linking the Madeira River in Brazil to the Mamore River in Bolivia was undertaken to solve the problem of rubber transportation in that region. The railway would help to get the Bolivian rubber out of the jungle, past the rapids on the Madeira and then reach the navigable part of the river in Porto Velho, in the state of Rondônia. For the construction of the Madeira-Mamoré railroad, many West Indian workers, especially from Barbados, were taken to that part of the Brazilian Amazon. The enterprise was first a British project but later was controlled by the American Percival Farquhar who had a Brazilian business empire.

This adventure in the Amazon brought about the death of about six thousand workers, caused by attacks from Indigenous Amerindian tribes, malaria and many other diseases.

The term Barbadian, in fact, was used as a globalizing identification attributed to the foreign Blacks who went to the Amazon from several parts of the Caribbean, mainly Barbados, but also from Saint Lucia, Jamaica, Martinique, Grenada, Saint Vincent and the Grenadines and Trinidad and Tobago. They migrated, or rather were taken, to the Brazilian state of Rondônia which was a wilderness in the beginning of the twentieth century.

It was a migration motivated by work, by the search for a new life, causing the rupture of family roots and culture as well as producing a feeling of displacement and lack of emotional ties. Their job was to cut the railway through the mainly terrain of Rio Abuna. Under the order of the English engineer, Collier, the Caribbeans worked hard for the American enterprise.

== Notable Caribbean Brazilians ==
- Nabiyah Be - Actress
- Alfred Enoch - Actor
- Adriana Lima - Model
- Tony Tornado - Singer

== See also ==
- Barbadian Brazilians
- Haitian Brazilians
