= Antiguans and Barbudans in the United Kingdom =

Total population
- Antigua and Barbuda-born residents 3,891 (2001 Census)

Regions with significant populations
- Throughout the UK, in particular Greater London, West Midlands and Greater Manchester

Languages
- English (British English), Antiguan and Barbudan Creole

Religion
- Primarily Protestantism

Related ethnic groups
- British African-Caribbean community, British Indo-Caribbean community, Black British, Black African, Mulatto

Antiguans and Barbudans in the United Kingdom are residents or citizens of the United Kingdom who can trace their roots to Antigua and Barbuda.

== Population ==
At the time of the 2001 UK Census, 3,891 people born in Antigua and Barbuda were living in the United Kingdom, representing around 1.5 per cent of all Caribbean-born people living in the country. In 2001, Antigua and Barbuda was the 11th most common birthplace in the Caribbean for British residents and 109th most common out of all nations.

== See also ==
- Black British
- British Mixed
- Caribbean British
- British African-Caribbean people
