= Barbadian British =

Bajan British people
Total population
- 21,601 Bajan born (2001 Census); 18,672 (2011 Census)

Regions with significant populations
- Throughout the United Kingdom; In particular East Anglia, Greater London, Manchester-Liverpool Urban Area and the Midlands

Languages
- English (British English, Bajan)

Religion
- Primarily Protestantism

Related ethnic groups
- British African-Caribbean people, British Indo-Caribbean people, Barbadian Brazilians, Barbadian Canadians, Black British, Black African, Multiracial, Indo-Caribbeans, Indo-Guyanese, Barbadian Americans

Barbadian British people, Bajan Brits or British Barbadians, are citizens or residents of the United Kingdom whose ethnic origins lie fully or partially in the Caribbean island of Barbados. The UK is home to the second largest Barbadian-born migrant population out of all the OECD countries, with the 2001 Census recording 21,601 UK residents born on the Caribbean island, compared to the 53,785 Barbadian-born residents of the United States.

== History ==
Historically migration from Barbados to the UK was fairly simple, since many Barbadians once held overseas British citizenship (see: Barbados and British nationality), but the number of Barbadians migrating to the UK increased after the 1952 McCarran Act put "severe curbs" on Caribbean immigration to the nearby United States. In 1955, the Barbados government established a Sponsored Workers Scheme and appointed an officer in London to help find work for Barbadians in the UK, due to the perception that population pressure was too great in Barbados. Between 1955 and 1966, more than 27,000 Barbadians migrated to the UK. This represented the largest mass migration from the Caribbean island since 45,000 people emigrated to Panama in the 1900s and 1910s, and was part of a wider migration of people from the Caribbean to the UK which saw 550,000 people migrate between 1948 and 1973, with the majority doing so before the passing of the Commonwealth Immigrants Act 1962. They were recruited to fill labour shortages in the UK in sectors such as transport and healthcare. Migration from Barbados to the UK between 1951 and 1971 represented 12 per cent of the population of Barbados.

== Demographics ==
=== Population ===
According to the 2001 UK Census, 21,601 people born in Barbados were living in the United Kingdom, representing around 8 per cent of all Caribbean-born people living in the country. In 2001, Barbados was the second most common birthplace in the Caribbean for UK residents and 47th most common out of all birth countries. By comparison, the 1971 Census recorded 27,055 people born in Barbados.

=== Citizenship ===
The number of Barbadian citizenships successfully applying for British citizenship since 1997 is shown in the table below. The number of Barbadians being granted British citizenship per annum has recently begun to decrease, unlike those from Jamaica (from where an increasing number of people are being granted citizenship).

| | Number of Barbadians granted British citizenship |
|---|---|
| 1997 | 64 |
| 1998 | 116 |
| 1999 | 131 |
| 2000 | 178 |
| 2001 | 155 |
| 2002 | 140 |
| 2003 | 155 |
| 2004 | 175 |
| 2005 | 175 |
| 2006 | 145 |
| 2007 | 105 |
| 2008 | 85 |
| 2009 | ? |

=== Distribution ===
Reading in Berkshire is reported to have the largest Barbadian community outside of the Caribbean, whilst Ipswich, the county town of Suffolk is also home to a large Bajan population, with 2.7 per cent of the population originating in the Caribbean nation. The National Council of Barbadian Associations (UK) has branches in Huddersfield, Leeds, Liverpool and Merseyside, Manchester, Oldham, Preston, Coventry, Leicester, Birmingham, London, Bath and Bristol, and Reading.

== Culture ==
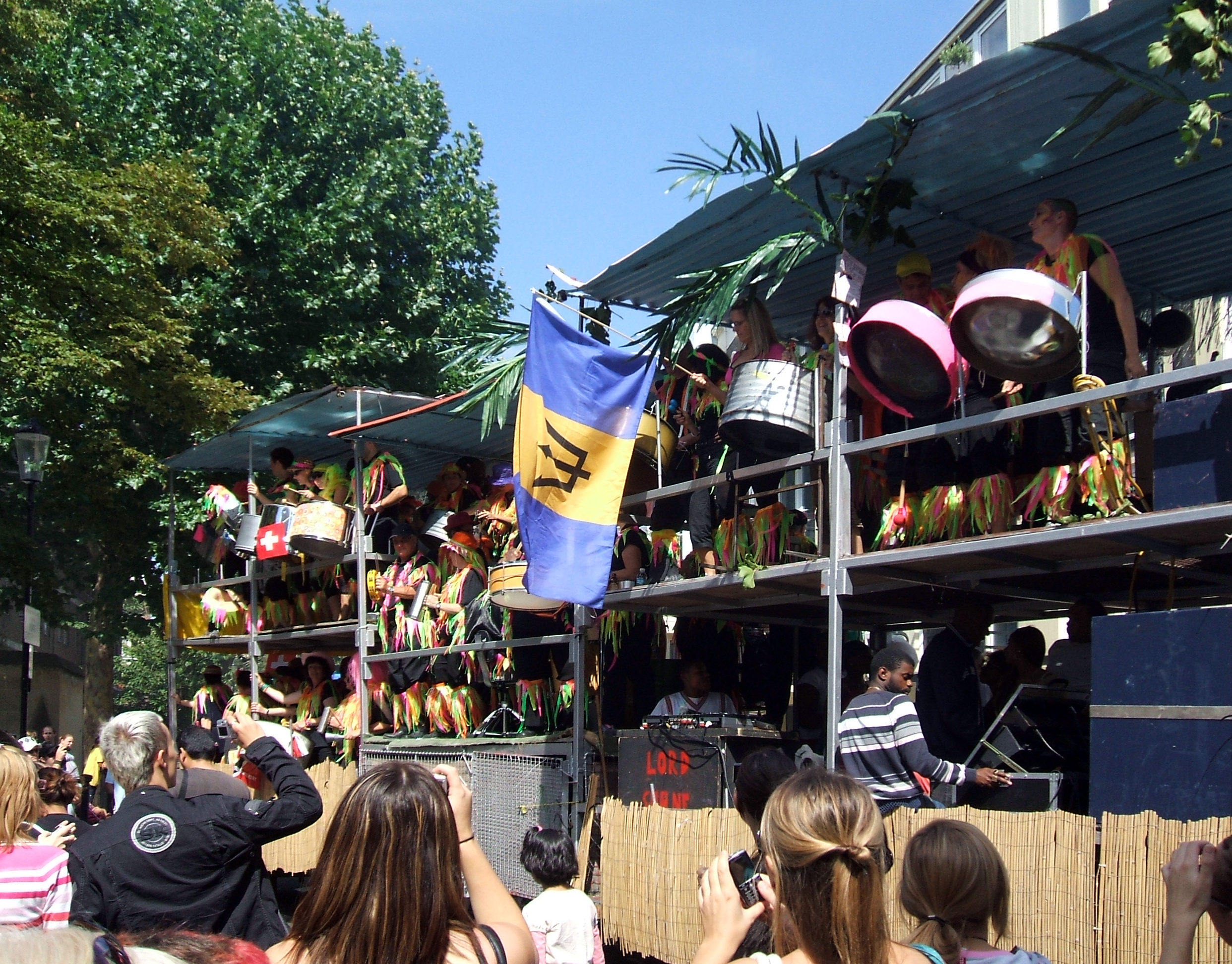
Barbadian culture is celebrated as part of the Notting Hill Carnival

Barbados along with many other Caribbean nations was once part of the British Empire, between 1627 and 1966 the Island was under British rule, and it retained more of a 'British' identity compared to the other surrounding nations. Barbados was often referred to as Little England by its inhabitants as well as neighbours. The result of this close bond between the two nations is that the UK proves the most popular destination for Barbadian emigrants who then find it much easier to settle into society than many other English and non-English speaking immigrant groups. Leading on from British colonial rule in Barbados, one of the island nation's most popular pastimes is playing cricket (a sport introduced and still played by the British). The culture of the Barbadian community in the UK is also heavily influenced by West African cultures, due to traditions dating back to the slave trade generation.

=== Music ===
The music of Barbados is much more Afro-Caribbean than English based, calypso and the indigenous Spouge genres are both unique within the Caribbean as are Reggae, soca, and tuk which have now found their way into mainstream Western culture. Notable British musicians of Barbadian origin who have helped popularise the music of Barbados in the UK include Dennis Bovell who is largely a producer of reggae music, Jimmy Senya Haynes of roots reggae band Steel Pulse who was the only person of Barbadian origin to win a Grammy Award (only recently did singer Rihanna join the title). female Barbadian soca artist Alison Hinds was based in London, she now resides in Barbados. 90's singer Des'ree is also famed for her singles "Feel So High", "You Gotta Be", "Kissing You", and "Life" which are mostly soul based. Shaznay Lewis and Ms. Dynamite are more contemporary artists that have helped bridge the gap closer between genres such as R&B, soul, hip-hop and reggae.

=== Sport ===
Several Barbadian-born cricketers have pursued cricket careers in the country where the sport originated, including, for example, Sussex CCC's Chris Jordan and Jofra Archer.

A number of Barbadian-born and British-born people of Barbadian descent play in professional league football teams, and some British-born players of Barbadian origin have chosen to play for the Barbados national football team. Emmerson Boyce is a native of Aylesbury who plays for Wigan Athletic and the Barbados national team, Ashley Cole of Stepney, London played left back for Chelsea and the England national team, and fellow Londoner Michael Gilkes has played for Barbados alongside Reading. Likewise, Paul Ifill and Mark McCammon have played for Barbados alongside the English sides Crystal Palace and Gillingham respectively. Walter Tull, whose father was from Barbados, was the first black officer in the British Army and only the second black player in the top division of the Football League. Former WBC super middleweight world champion boxer Nigel Benn is Barbadian British.

== See also ==
- Black British
- Caribbean British
- Barbados–United Kingdom relations
- British African-Caribbean community
