= Barbadians =

People who are identified with the country of Barbados

Bajans
- Flag of Barbados

Regions with significant populations
- Barbados 284,589 (2014)
- United States: 65,653 (2013)
- Canada: 37,780 (2016)
- United Kingdom: 18,762 (2011)
- Brazil: 5,000
- Trinidad and Tobago: 1,147
- Jamaica: 1,000
- Australia: 483

Languages
- Bajan Creole, Bajan English, Spanish

Religion
- Predominantly Protestant, minority (3.4%) Roman Catholic, other religions include Islam, Judaism, Rastafari, Wicca, Hinduism, Buddhism and Baha’i

Related ethnic groups
- Other Caribbean peoples (especially Afro-Caribbeans), Americo-Liberians

Barbadians, often contracted as Bajans (pronounced /ˈbeɪdʒənz/ BAY-jənz), are people who are identified with the country of Barbados, by being citizens or their descendants in the Bajan diaspora. The connection may be residential, legal, historical or cultural. For most Bajans, several (or all) of those connections exist and are collectively the source of their identity. Bajans are a multi-ethnic and multicultural society of various ethnic, religious and national origins; therefore Bajans do not necessarily equate their ethnicity with their Bajan nationality.

== History ==
The earliest inhabitants of Barbados were Indigenous Kalinago and Arawaks from South America. Between 1536 and 1550, Spanish raiders regularly seized Indigenous Taino and Kalinago from Barbados to be used as slave labour on regional plantations. This contributed to Kalinago migration from the island for other Caribbean destinations such as Dominica and St Vincent. The first European settlement on Barbados was by English colonists. Africans were later brought to Barbados during the slave trade. The Portuguese also colonized the island. The English founded a settlement between 1627 and 1628, and Barbados remained under British control until gaining independence in 1966, making it the only Caribbean island that did not change hands during the turbulent colonial period. The island’s early population mainly consisted of English farmers who grew tobacco, cotton, ginger, and indigo. Labor was supplied by European indentured servants or Irish prisoners until the sugar industry began in the 1640s. Sugar cultivation was introduced by Dutch settlers from the Dutch Brazilian territories. Since plantation farming required more laborers than Europe could provide, African slaves were brought in. Eventually, Africans became the largest group in Barbados after slavery. The English Civil War led to many Parliamentarians and Royalists relocating to Barbados. The increasing number of slaves and their harsh living conditions contributed to the first slave revolt in 1675. Slavery caused many former European workers to leave, mostly moving to the Carolinas including North Carolina and South Carolina and Jamaica. The island thrived as the English elite gained influence in the British Parliament. Throughout the 18th century, sugar remained the dominant industry, and in 1795, the British government established a permanent military force to defend the island and suppress uprisings.

== Ethnic groups ==
Most Barbadians are of African or mixed-race descent. They are descendants of enslaved people brought from West Africa. Mixed-race Barbadians are descendants of Europeans, Africans, and other ethnic groups. White Barbadians are mainly of British and Irish descent. There is also a small population of Syrians, Lebanese, Jewish, Indian and Chinese people in the country. Scotland deported Roma to Barbados in the seventeenth century. Barbados has a small Asian population who are mainly Indians. The Asians were brought to Barbados as indentured labourers in the late 19th century. Barbados's Indian population also comes from Guyana. Indians have influenced Barbadian cuisine, music, and culture. Barbados is also home to expatriates from other countries who mainly come from the United Kingdom, Canada, and the United States. Other ethnic groups in Barbados include small populations from other Caribbean islands. Additionally, Spanish is becoming more commonly spoken due to the increasing number of Hispanic immigrants in Barbados.

The largest ethnic groups in Barbados are black (92.4%) or mixed (3.1%). 2.7% of Barbados' population is white and 1.3% South Asian. The remaining 0.4% are East Asians (0.1%) and Middle Easterners (0.1%).

== Culture ==
Barbadian culture is influenced largely by British, Irish and West African traditions. Barbados is famous for its music, with genres such as calypso, soca, and reggae being the most popular in the country. Rihanna is one of the most well-known Barbadian musicians. Barbadian cuisine is a fusion of African, European, Indian and other Caribbean influences. Some of Barbados's most popular dishes are cou-cou and flying fish. Barbados's rum industry is a significant contributor to Barbadian culture and history.

== Diaspora ==
Many Barbadians now live overseas and outside of Barbados; the majority have migrated to Anglophone countries, including around 65,000 in the United States, 37,780 in Canada, some 19,000 in the United Kingdom, and some 500–1,000 Barbadians in Liberia. In addition to Anglophone countries other groups of Barbadians have moved to Latin countries including Brazil, Cuba and Panama.

== See also ==
- Barbadian nationality law
- Demographics of Barbados
- Afro-Barbadians
- Barbadian Americans
- Barbadian Brazilians
- Barbadian British
- Barbadian Canadians
- Kalinago
