= Barbados–Brazil relations =

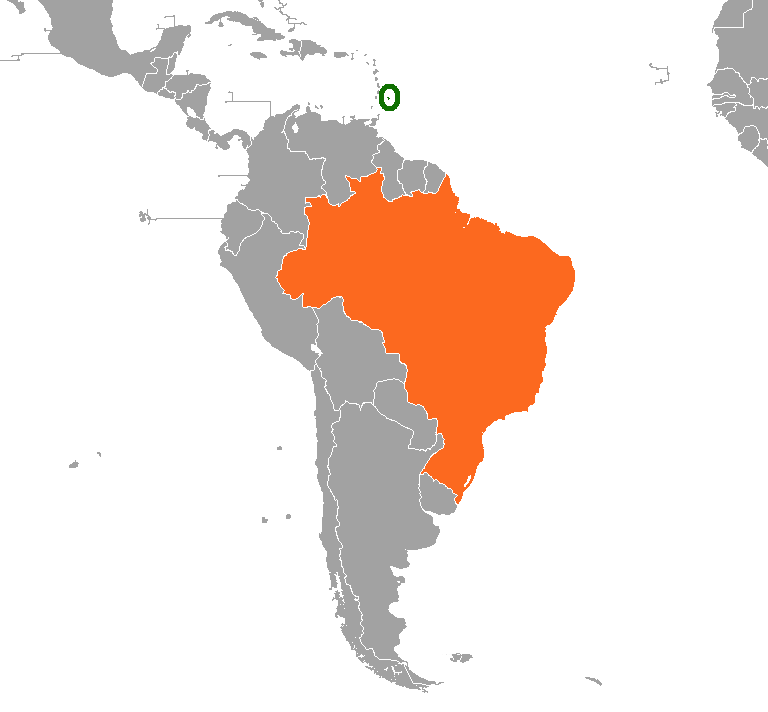
- Barbados: Brazil

Barbados–Brazil relations are the foreign relations between Barbados and Brazil. Barbados and Brazil established diplomatic relations on 26 November 1971. Brazil has a resident Embassy in Hastings, Christ Church; while Barbados, which traditionally accredited its Ambassador in Caracas as its non-resident Ambassador to Brazil, opened an actual embassy in Brasília, Brazil on 27 April 2010. Relations between both nations have steadily increased between both nations, especially during 2010. Barbados and Brazil are members of the United Nations Economic Commission for Latin America and the Caribbean and the Community of Latin American and Caribbean States.

== Cooperation ==
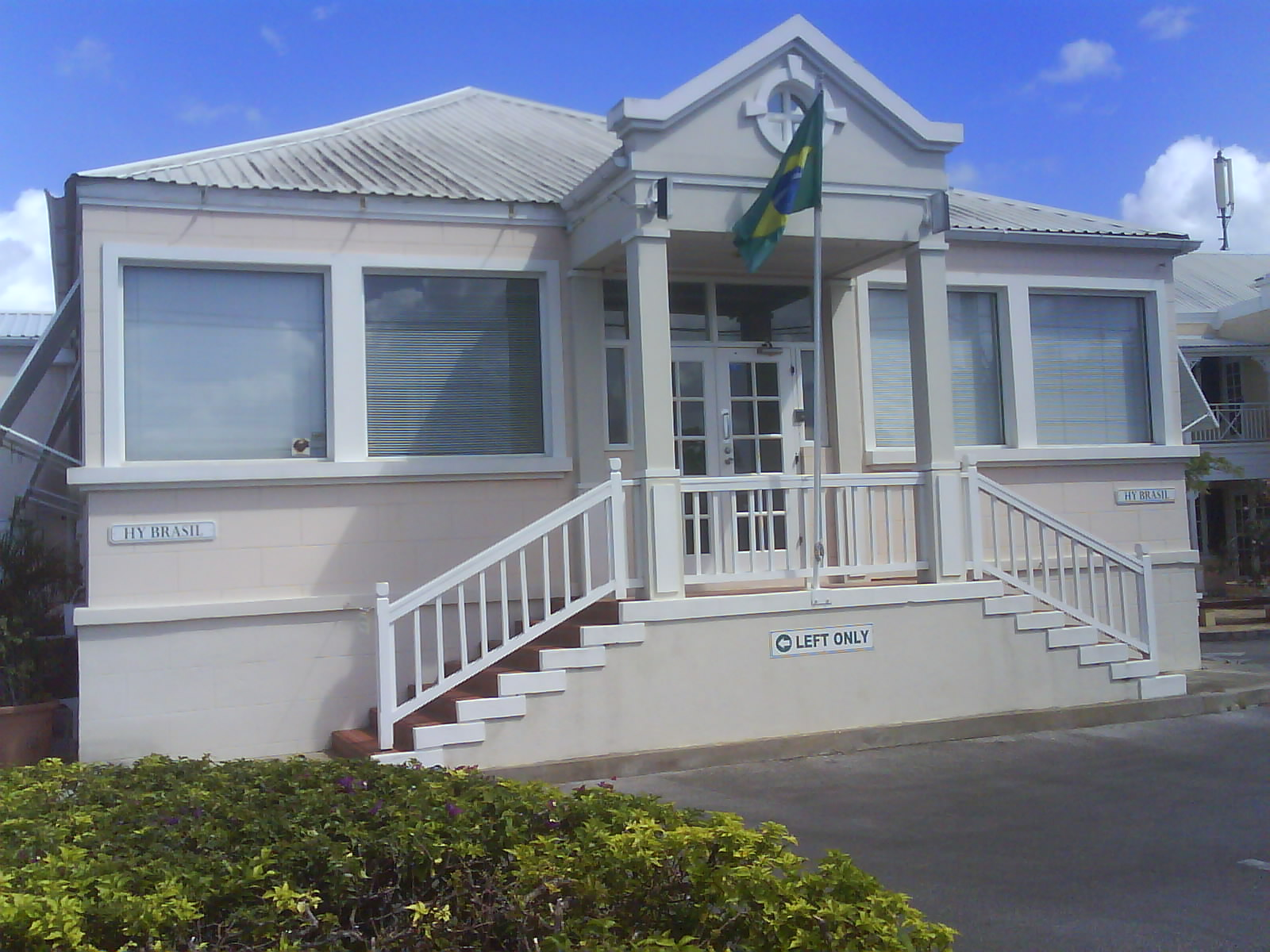
Embassy of Brazil (in Bridgetown)

In 2010 several agreements for cooperation have been signed between Brazilian officials and their Barbadian counterparts. On 26 April Barbados was one of several CARICOM nations to take part in the "Brazil–Caribbean Community Summit". During the event several agreements between Barbados and Brazil were signed, including: a Memorandum of Understanding for a Bilateral Technical Cooperation Agreement, a Cultural Cooperation Agreement, an Air Services Agreement, a Complementary Agreement for the implementation of projects in the field of health; and an agreement to expand the provision of Brazilian lecturers at the University of the West Indies campus in Barbados, with a reciprocal plan to expand similar Caribbean studies programmes in Brazilian institutions of higher education.

On 7 October Brazil's Ambassador signed a US$562 600 agreement to a fund Disaster Risk Reduction with the Barbados-based Caribbean Disaster Emergency Management Agency (CDEMA).

Also in 2010 both nations signed an agreement to cooperate in the sport of football. Today the agreement has allowed a small group of Barbadian youths to play football at Brazilian football clubs in that nation, with the Barbadian government calling on companies to financially support the new initiative.

The University of the West Indies in Barbados has begun research on families of Barbadian descent which moved to Brazil in the early 20th century, known there as "Barbadianos", the migratory link is being explored as some of Barbados' more prominent names have survived in that South American nation while others have been assimilated into Brazilian culture.

In 2011, a group of Samba dancers from the group Sociedade Rosas de Ouro met with Barbados' Minister Of Tourism, Richard Sealy, and also took part in Barbados' biggest festival Crop Over. At the group's meeting with the Minister he touched on Barbados' ties with Brazil and urged more Barbadians to choose Brazil as a vacation destination.

=== GOL Airlines ===
After holding negotiations over a number of years both countries officially witnessed the inaugural direct-flight on 26 June 2010. Operated by GOL Airlines the inaugural flight arrived in Barbados at 9:45pm. The cost of the initial scheduled airlift for the Barbados Government has been ridiculed by the political opposition in Parliament, but the David Thompson and subsequent Freundel Stuart administrations attribute Brazilian tourists as a large portion of the increased tourists to Barbados during the economic downturn.

== Trade ==
Negotiations are ongoing to spur trade and business via the new airlink between both nations. This has been done in part by trade missions to Brazil. Barbados, as one of three nations that were joint stakeholders of LIAT proposed that LIAT and GOL should team up to promote low-cost airfares between the entire Caribbean and South America, with Barbadian official hoping it could utilise the Grantley Adams International Airport in Barbados as a focal point.

== See also ==
- Barbadians in Brazil
- History of the Jews in Barbados, from (Recife, Brazil)
- Foreign relations of Barbados
- Foreign relations of Brazil
- Union of South American Nations
