= Visa requirements for Barbadian citizens =

Entry restrictions for Barbadian citizens

Visa requirements for Barbadian citizens are administrative entry restrictions by the authorities of other states placed on citizens of Barbados. As of 2026, Barbadian citizens have visa-free or visa on arrival access to 163 countries and territories, ranking the Barbadian passport 17th in terms of travel freedom according to the Henley Passport Index.

== Visa requirements map ==
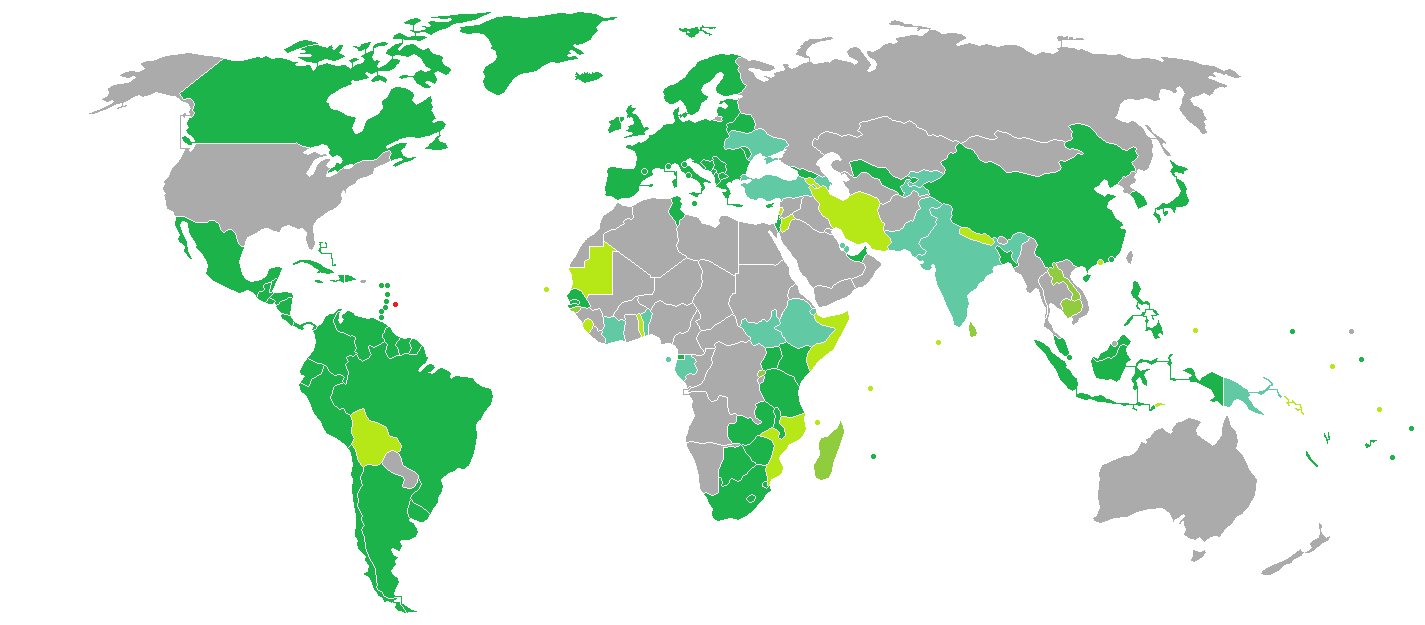
Visa requirements for Barbadian citizens Barbados Visa free access Visa on arrival eVisa Visa available both on arrival or online Visa required

== Visa requirements ==
Country	Visa requirement	Allowed stay	Notes (excluding departure fees)
Afghanistan	Visa required		
Albania	Visa not required	90 days	
Algeria	Visa required		
Andorra	Visa not required		
Angola	Visa not required	30 days	maximum 3 entries per year
Antigua and Barbuda	Visa not required	6 months	Holders of Caricom Certificate of Skills can stay indefinitely.
Argentina	Visa not required	90 days	
Armenia	eVisa/Visa on arrival	120 days	
Australia and territories	Online Visa required		May apply online (Online Visitor e600 visa).
Austria	Visa not required	90 days	90 days during a 180 days period following the date of first entry in the Schengen Area
Azerbaijan	eVisa	30 days	
Bahamas	Visa not required	3 months	
Bahrain	eVisa/Visa on arrival	14 days	
Bangladesh	Visa not required	90 days	
Belarus	Visa not required	30 days	Must arrive and depart via Minsk International Airport.
Belgium	Visa not required	90 days	90 days during a 180 days period following the date of first entry in the Schengen Area
Belize	Visa not required		* **Freedom of movement among Barbados, Belize, Dominica and St. Vincent & the Grenadines** (implementing full free movement from 1 October 2025)
Benin	eVisa	30 days	Must have an international vaccination certificate.
Bhutan	eVisa	90 days	Visa fee is USD 40 per person and visa application may be processed within 5 business days with duration of stay of 90 days.; e-Visa applicant is also subject to pay Sustainable Development Fee
Bolivia	Visa on arrival	90 days	
Bosnia and Herzegovina	Visa not required	90 days	90 days within any 180 days period
Botswana	Visa not required	90 days	
Brazil	Visa not required	90 days	
Brunei	Visa required		
Bulgaria	Visa not required	90 days	90 days within any 180 days period
Burkina Faso	eVisa		
Burundi	Visa on arrival		
Cambodia	Visa on arrival / eVisa	30 days	
Cameroon	eVisa	30 days	
Canada	eTA / Visa not required	6 months	eTA required if arriving by air.
Cape Verde	Visa on arrival	30 days	Visa on arrival at Sal, Boa Vista, São Vicente or Santiago international airports.; Requirement to register online 5 days before arrival; Also pay the airport security fee of CVE 3400 either online or on arrival.
Central African Republic	Visa required		
Chad	eVisa		
Chile	Visa not required	90 days	
China	Visa not required	30 days	
Colombia	Visa not required	90 days	90 days - extendable up to 180-days stay within a one-year period
Comoros	Visa on arrival		
Republic of the Congo	Visa required		
Democratic Republic of the Congo	eVisa		
Costa Rica	Visa not required	90 days	
Côte d'Ivoire	Visa required		
Croatia	Visa not required	3 months	90 days within any 180 days period
Cuba	Visa not required	28 days	
Cyprus	Visa not required	90 days	90 days within any 180 day period
Czech Republic	Visa not required	90 days	90 days during a 180 days period following the date of first entry in the Schengen Area
Denmark	Visa not required	90 days	90 days during a 180 days period following the date of first entry in the Schengen Area
Djibouti	eVisa	31 days	
Dominica	Visa not required	6 months	Holders of Caricom Certificate of Skills can stay indefinitely.
Dominican Republic	Visa not required	30 days	Can be extended up to 120 days
Ecuador	Visa not required	90 days	
Egypt	Visa on arrival	30 days	
El Salvador	Visa not required	180 days	
Equatorial Guinea	Visa not required		
Eritrea	Visa required		
Estonia	Visa not required	90 days	90 days during a 180 days period following the date of first entry in the Schengen Area
Eswatini	Visa not required	30 days	
Ethiopia	eVisa	up to 90 days	eVisa holders must arrive via Addis Ababa Bole International Airport
Fiji	Visa not required	4 months	
Finland	Visa not required	90 days	90 days during a 180 days period following the date of first entry in the Schengen Area
France	Visa not required	90 days	90 days during a 180 days period following the date of first entry in the Schengen Area; (See also: French Caribbean Departments)
Gabon	eVisa		Electronic visa holders must arrive via Libreville International Airport.
Gambia	Visa not required	90 days	
Georgia	Visa not required	1 year	
Germany	Visa not required	90 days	90 days during a 180 days period following the date of first entry in the Schengen Area
Ghana	Visa not required	60 days	
Greece	Visa not required	90 days	90 days during a 180 days period following the date of first entry in the Schengen Area
Grenada	Visa not required	3 months	Holders of Caricom Certificate of Skills can stay indefinitely.; Beginning on 1 December 2020, all travellers to Grenada will be required to complete an online application in order to receive a Pure Safe Travel Authorization Certificate to enter Grenada.
Guatemala	Visa not required	90 days	
Guinea	eVisa	90 days	
Guinea-Bissau	Visa on arrival	90 days	
Guyana	Visa not required	6 months	Holders of Caricom Certificate of Skills can stay indefinitely.
Haiti	Visa not required	3 months	
Honduras	Visa not required	90 days	
Hungary	Visa not required	90 days	90 days during a 180 days period following the date of first entry in the Schengen Area
Iceland	Visa not required	90 days	90 days during a 180 days period following the date of first entry in the Schengen Area
India	e-Visa	30 days	e-Visa holders must arrive via 32 designated airports (Note: Ahmedabad; Amritsar; Bagdogra; Bengaluru; Bhubaneswar; Chandigarh; Chennai; Coimbatore; Delhi; Gaya; Goa-Dabolim; Goa-Manohar; Guwahati; Hyderabad; Indore; Jaipur; Kannur; Kochi; Kolkata; Kozhikode; Lucknow; Madurai; Mangaluru; Mumbai; Nagpur; Port Blair; Pune; Surat; Thiruvananthapuram; Tiruchirappalli; Varanasi; Visakhapatnam) or 5 designated seaports. (Note: Chennai; Cochin; Mormugao (Goa); Mumbai; Mangalore); An Indian e-Tourist Visa may only be obtained twice within 1 calendar year.; Foreigners of Pakistani origin or who hold a Pakistani Passport are not eligible for an e-Visa. Foreigners who are not Pakistani nationals, but whose parents or grandparents (either paternal or maternal) were born in, or were permanent residents in Pakistan, are also not eligible for an e-Visa.
Indonesia	Visa required		
Iran	eVisa/Visa on arrival	30 days	
Iraq	eVisa	30 days	
Ireland	Visa not required	90 days	
Israel	Electronic Travel Authorization	90 days	
Italy	Visa not required	90 days	90 days during a 180 days period following the date of first entry in the Schengen Area
Jamaica	Visa not required	180 days	Holders of Caricom Certificate of Skills can stay indefinitely.
Japan	Visa not required	90 days	Visa not required for visits up to 90 days using the Barbadian passports with the Machine-readable passport according of Here
Jordan	eVisa/Visa on arrival	30 days	Conditions apply
Kazakhstan	eVisa		
Kenya	Visa not required	90 days	
Kiribati	Visa not required	90 days	90 days during any calendar year period
North Korea	Visa required		
South Korea	Electronic Travel Authorization	90 days	
Kuwait	Visa required		
Kyrgyzstan	eVisa	30 days	Electronic visa holders must arrive via Manas International Airport or Osh Airport or through land crossings with China (at Irkeshtam and Torugart), Kazakhstan (at Ak-jol, Ak-Tilek, Chaldybar, Chon-Kapka), Tajikistan (at Bor-Dobo, Kulundu, Kyzyl-Bel) and Uzbekistan (at Dostuk).
Laos	eVisa / Visa on arrival	30 days	18 (Note: Savannakhet Airport; Lanetoui - Mengkang (China); Meuangmom - Wan Pong (Myanmar); Banvang - Ban Khok Phai (Thailand); Namngeun - Huay Kon (Thailand); Paksan - Bueng Kan (Thailand); Paktaphan - Pak Saeng (Thailand); Pangmon - Ban Huak (Thailand); Phoudou (Thailand); Dak ta ock - Nam Giang (Vietnam); La Lai (Vietnam); Namkan (Vietnam); Namphao - Cau Treo (Vietnam); Namsoy - Na Meo (Vietnam); Naphao - Cha Lo (Vietnam); Pahang - Long Sap (Vietnam); Panghok - Tây Trang (Vietnam); Phoukeua - Bo Y (Vietnam)) of the 33 border crossings are only open to regular visa holders.; e-Visa may be used to enter Laos through the Luang Prabang, Pakse and Vientiane international airports, 3 Thai-Lao Friendship Bridges (Note: Vientiane (Friendship Bridge 1); Savannakhet (Friendship Bridge 2); Bokeo (Friendship Bridge 4)), in Boten (road and railroad), and in Vientiane (at Khamsavath railway station).; Visa on arrival is available at the Luang Prabang, Pakse and Vientiane international airports, 4 Thai-Lao Friendship Bridges (Note: Vientiane (Friendship Bridge 1); Savannakhet (Friendship Bridge 2); Khammouane (Friendship Bridge 3); Bokeo (Friendship Bridge 4)) and 7 border crossings. (Note: Nongnokkheane - Trapeang Kriel (Cambodia); Boten - Bo han (China); Golden Triangle/Samliemkham (Thailand); Khamsavath railway station (Thailand); Namheuang - Ban Na Kraseng (Thailand); Vang tao - Chongmek (Thailand); Dansavan - Lao Bảo (Vietnam))
Latvia	Visa not required	90 days	90 days during a 180 days period following the date of first entry in the Schengen Area
Lebanon	Visa on arrival	1 month	1 month extendable for 2 additional months; granted free of charge at Beirut International Airport or any other port of entry if there is no Israeli visa or seal, holding a telephone number, an address in Lebanon, and a non refundable return or circle trip ticket.
Lesotho	Visa not required	90 days	
Liberia	Visa required		
Libya	eVisa		
Liechtenstein	Visa not required	90 days	90 days during a 180 days period following the date of first entry in the Schengen Area
Lithuania	Visa not required	90 days	90 days during a 180 days period following the date of first entry in the Schengen Area
Luxembourg	Visa not required	90 days	90 days during a 180 days period following the date of first entry in the Schengen Area
Madagascar	eVisa / Visa on arrival	90 days	
Malawi	Visa not required	90 days	
Malaysia	Visa not required	90 days	
Maldives	Visa on arrival	30 days	
Mali	Visa required		
Malta	Visa not required	90 days	90 days during a 180 days period following the date of first entry in the Schengen Area
Marshall Islands	Visa on arrival	90 days	
Mauritania	eVisa		Available at Nouakchott–Oumtounsy International Airport.
Mauritius	Visa not required	180 days	180 days per year for tourism, 120 days per year for business
Mexico	Visa not required	180 days	
Micronesia	Visa not required	30 days	
Moldova	Visa not required	90 days	90 days within any 180 day period
Monaco	Visa not required		
Mongolia	eVisa	30 days	
Montenegro	Visa not required	90 days	
Morocco	Visa required		eVisa if they hold visa or permanent residency issued by Schengen Area, Australia, Canada, Ireland, New Zealand, the United Kingdom or the United States and only resident residency issued by Cyprus, Japan and the United Arab Emirates
Mozambique	eVisa/Visa on arrival	30 days	
Myanmar	Visa required		
Namibia	Visa required		
Nauru	Visa required		
Nepal	eVisa/Visa on arrival	90 days	
Netherlands	Visa not required	90 days	90 days during a 180 days period following the date of first entry in the Schengen Area (See also: Dutch Caribbean territories)
New Zealand and territories	Visa required		Holders of an Australian Permanent Resident Visa or Resident Return Visa may be granted a New Zealand Resident Visa on arrival permitting indefinite stay (pursuant to the Trans-Tasman Travel Arrangement), subject to meeting character requirements and obtaining an Electronic Travel Authority prior to departure.
Nicaragua	Visa not required	90 days	
Niger	Visa required		
Nigeria	eVisa		
North Macedonia	Visa not required	90 days	
Norway	Visa not required	90 days	90 days during a 180 days period following the date of first entry in the Schengen Area
Oman	Visa required		
Pakistan	Electronic Travel Authorization		Electronic Travel Authorization to obtain a visa on arrival for tourism purposes.; Electronic Travel Authorization to obtain a visa on arrival for business purposes.; Online Visa eligible.
Palau	Visa on arrival	30 days	
Panama	Visa not required	90 days	
Papua New Guinea	Easy Visitor Permit	30 days	
Paraguay	Visa required		
Peru	Visa not required	90 days	
Philippines	Visa not required	30 days	
Poland	Visa not required	90 days	90 days during a 180 days period following the date of first entry in the Schengen Area
Portugal	Visa not required	90 days	90 days during a 180 days period following the date of first entry in the Schengen Area
Qatar	eVisa		
Romania	Visa not required	90 days	3 months within any 6-month period
Russia	eVisa	16 days	
Rwanda	Visa not required	30 days	
Saint Kitts and Nevis	Visa not required	6 months	Holders of Caricom Certificate of Skills can stay indefinitely.
Saint Lucia	Visa not required	6 months	Holders of Caricom Certificate of Skills can stay indefinitely.
Saint Vincent and the Grenadines	Visa not required	6 months	Holders of Caricom Certificate of Skills can stay indefinitely.
Samoa	Entry Permit on arrival	60 days	
San Marino	Visa not required		
São Tomé and Príncipe	eVisa		
Saudi Arabia	eVisa	90 days	
Senegal	Visa on arrival	1 month	
Serbia	Visa not required	30 days	30 days within any year period
Seychelles	Visitor's Permit on arrival	3 months	
Sierra Leone	Visa on arrival	1 month	
Singapore	Visa not required	30 days	
Slovakia	Visa not required	90 days	90 days during a 180 days period following the date of first entry in the Schengen Area
Slovenia	Visa not required	90 days	90 days during a 180 days period following the date of first entry in the Schengen Area
Solomon Islands	Visitor's permit on arrival	3 months	
Somalia	eVisa	30 days	Available at Bosaso Airport, Galcaio Airport and Mogadishu Airport.
South Africa	Visa not required	30 days	
South Sudan	Electronic Visa		Obtainable online; Printed visa authorization must be presented at the time of travel
Spain	Visa not required	90 days	90 days during a 180 days period following the date of first entry in the Schengen Area
Sri Lanka	Electronic Travel Authorization	30 days	
Sudan	Visa required		
Suriname	Visa not required	90 days	Holders of Caricom Certificate of Skills can stay indefinitely.
Sweden	Visa not required	90 days	90 days during a 180 days period following the date of first entry in the Schengen Area
Switzerland	Visa not required	90 days	90 days during a 180 days period following the date of first entry in the Schengen Area
Syria	eVisa		
Tajikistan	eVisa	60 days	
Tanzania	Visa not required	3 months	
Thailand	eVisa	60 days	
Timor-Leste	Visa on arrival	30 days	
Togo	eVisa		
Tonga	Visa on arrival	31 days	
Trinidad and Tobago	Visa not required	6 months	Holders of Caricom Certificate of Skills can stay indefinitely.
Tunisia	Visa not required	3 months	
Turkey	eVisa	30 days	
Turkmenistan	Visa required		
Tuvalu	Visa on arrival	1 month	
Uganda	Visa not required	3 months	
Ukraine	eVisa		
United Arab Emirates	Visa not required	90 days	
United Kingdom and Crown dependencies	Electronic Travel Authorization	6 months	(See also: UK-Overseas territories)
United States	Visa required		
Uruguay	Visa not required	90 days	
Uzbekistan	Visa not required	30 days	
Vanuatu	Visa not required	120 days	
Vatican City	Visa not required		
Venezuela	Visa not required	90 days	
Vietnam	eVisa	90 days	Phú Quốc can be visited without a visa for up to 30 days.
Yemen	Visa required		
Zambia	Visa not required	90 days	
Zimbabwe	Visa not required	3 months	

== Dependent, Disputed, or Restricted territories ==
Unrecognized or partially recognized countries

Territory	Conditions of access	Notes
Abkhazia	Visa required	
Kosovo	Visa not required	90 days
Northern Cyprus	Visa not required	
Palestine	Visa not required	Arrival by sea to Gaza Strip not allowed.
Sahrawi Arab Democratic Republic		Undefined visa regime in the Western Sahara controlled territory.
Somaliland	Visa on arrival	30 days for 30 US dollars, payable on arrival.
South Ossetia	Visa not required	Multiple entry visa to Russia and three day prior notification are required to enter South Ossetia.
Taiwan	Visa required	
Transnistria	Visa not required	Registration required after 24h.

Dependent and autonomous territories

Territory	Conditions of access	Notes
China
Hong Kong	Visa not required	90 days
Macau	Visa on arrival	30 days
Denmark
Faroe Islands	Visa not required	90 days
Greenland	Visa not required	90 days
France
French Guiana	Visa not required	90 days
French Polynesia	Visa not required	90 days
(France) French West Indies	Visa not required	Includes overseas departments of Guadeloupe and Martinique and overseas collectivities of Saint Barthélemy and Saint Martin.
Mayotte	Visa not required	90 days
New Caledonia	Visa not required	90 days
Réunion	Visa not required	90 days
Saint Pierre and Miquelon	Visa not required	90 days
Wallis and Futuna	Visa not required	90 days
Netherlands
Aruba	Visa not required	90 days
Caribbean Netherlands	Visa not required	Includes Bonaire, Sint Eustatius and Saba.
Curaçao	Visa not required	90 days
Sint Maarten	Visa not required	90 days
New Zealand
Cook Islands	Visa not required	31 days
Niue	Visa not required	30 days
Tokelau	Visa required	
United Kingdom
Akrotiri and Dhekelia	Visa not required	Stays longer than 28 days per 12-month period require a permit.
Anguilla	Visa not required	3 months
Bermuda	Visa not required	6 months
British Indian Ocean Territory	Special permit required	Special permit required.
British Virgin Islands	Visa not required	1 month
Cayman Islands	Visa not required	6 months
Falkland Islands	Visa required	
Gibraltar	Visa not required	6 months
Montserrat	Visa not required	6 months
Pitcairn Islands	Visa not required	14 days visa free and landing fee US$35 or tax of US$5 if not going ashore.
Ascension Island	eVisa	3 months within any year period
Saint Helena	Visitor's Pass required	Visitor's Pass granted on arrival valid for 4/10/21/60/90 days for 12/14/16/20/25 pound sterling.
Tristan da Cunha	Permission required	Permission to land required for 15/30 pounds sterling (yacht/ship passenger) for Tristan da Cunha Island or 20 pounds sterling for Gough Island, Inaccessible Island or Nightingale Islands.
South Georgia and the South Sandwich Islands	Permit required	Pre-arrival permit from the Commissioner required (72 hours/1 month for 110/160 pounds sterling).
Turks and Caicos Islands	Visa not required	90 days
United States
American Samoa	Visa required	
Guam	Visa required	
Northern Mariana Islands	Visa required	
Puerto Rico	Visa required	
U.S. Virgin Islands	Visa required	
Antarctica and adjacent islands
Special permits required for Bouvet Island, British Antarctic Territory, French Southern and Antarctic Lands, Argentine Antarctica, (Australia) Australian Antarctic Territory, (Antártica Chilena Province) Chilean Antarctic Territory, (Australia) Heard Island and McDonald Islands, (Norway) Peter I Island, (Norway) Queen Maud Land, (New Zealand) Ross Dependency.

== Non-visa restrictions ==
=== Blank passport pages ===
Many countries require a minimum number of blank pages to be available in the passport being presented, typically one or two pages. Endorsement pages, which often appear after the visa pages, are not counted as being valid or available.

=== Vaccination ===
Cover of the new International Certificate of Vaccination issued by the Bureau of Quarantine in the Philippines since 2021

The African countries of Angola, Benin, Burkina Faso, Burundi, Cameroon, Central African Republic, Democratic Republic of the Congo, Republic of the Congo, Côte d'Ivoire, Gabon, Ghana, Guinea-Bissau, Mali, Niger, Sierra Leone and Togo, South Sudan and Uganda, along with French Guiana in South America, require all incoming passengers older than nine months to one year, to have a current International Certificate of Vaccination or Prophylaxis.

Some other countries require vaccination only if the passenger is coming from an infected area or has visited one recently or has transited for 12 hours in those countries: Algeria, Botswana, Cabo Verde, Chad, Djibouti, Egypt, Eswatini, Ethiopia, Gambia, Ghana, Guinea, Lesotho, Libya, Equatorial Guinea, Eritrea, Madagascar, Malawi, Mauritania, Mauritius, Mozambique, Namibia, Nigeria, Papua New Guinea, Seychelles, Somalia, South Africa, Sudan, Tunisia, Uganda, Tanzania, Zambia and Zimbabwe.

=== Passport validity length ===
Very few countries, such as Paraguay, just require a valid passport on arrival.

However many countries and groupings now require only an identity card – especially from their neighbours. Other countries may have special bilateral arrangements that depart from the generality of their passport validity length policies to shorten the period of passport validity required for each other's citizens or even accept passports that have already expired (but not been cancelled).

Some countries, such as Japan, Ireland and the United Kingdom, require a passport valid throughout the period of the intended stay.

In the absence of specific bilateral agreements, countries requiring passports to be valid for at least 6 more months on arrival include Afghanistan, Algeria, Anguilla, Bahrain, Bhutan, Botswana, British Virgin Islands, Brunei, Cambodia, Cameroon, Cape Verde, Cayman Islands, Central African Republic, Chad, Comoros, Costa Rica, Côte d'Ivoire, Curaçao, Ecuador, Egypt, El Salvador, Equatorial Guinea, Fiji, Gabon, Guinea Bissau, Guyana, Haiti, India, Indonesia, Iran, Iraq, Israel, Jordan, Kenya, Kiribati, Kuwait, Laos, Madagascar, Malaysia, Marshall Islands, Mongolia, Myanmar, Namibia, Nepal, Nicaragua, Nigeria, Oman, Palau, Papua New Guinea, Peru, Philippines, Qatar, Rwanda, Samoa, Saudi Arabia, Singapore, Solomon Islands, Somalia, Sri Lanka, Sudan, Suriname, Tanzania, Thailand, Timor-Leste, Tokelau, Tonga, Turkey, Tuvalu, Uganda, United Arab Emirates, Vanuatu, Venezuela, and Vietnam.

Countries requiring passports valid for at least 4 months on arrival include Micronesia and Zambia.

Countries requiring passports with a validity of at least 3 months beyond the date of intended departure include Azerbaijan, Bosnia and Herzegovina, Honduras, Montenegro, Nauru, Moldova and New Zealand. Similarly, the EEA countries of Iceland, Liechtenstein, Norway, all European Union countries (except Ireland) together with Switzerland also require 3 months validity beyond the date of the bearer's intended departure unless the bearer is an EEA or Swiss national.

Countries requiring passports valid for at least 3 months on arrival include Albania, North Macedonia, Panama, and Senegal.

Bermuda requires passports to be valid for at least 45 days upon entry.

Countries that require a passport validity of at least one month beyond the date of intended departure include Eritrea, Hong Kong, Lebanon, Macau, the Maldives and South Africa.

==== Maximum passport age ====
Countries of the Schengen area require non-EU passports to be less than 10 years old upon entry.

=== Criminal record ===
Some countries, including Australia, Canada, Fiji, New Zealand and the United States, routinely deny entry to non-citizens who have a criminal record, while others impose restrictions depending on the type of conviction and the length of the sentence.

=== Persona non grata ===
The government of a country can declare a diplomat persona non grata, banning them from entering the country or expelling them if they have already entered. In non-diplomatic use, the authorities of a country may also declare a foreigner persona non grata permanently or temporarily, usually because of unlawful activity.

=== Israeli stamps ===
Kuwait, Lebanon, Libya, and Yemen do not allow entry to people with passport stamps from Israel or whose passports have either a used or an unused Israeli visa, or where there is evidence of previous travel to Israel such as entry or exit stamps from neighbouring border posts in transit countries such as Jordan and Egypt.

To circumvent this Arab League boycott of Israel, the Israeli immigration services have now mostly ceased to stamp foreign nationals' passports on either entry to or exit from Israel (unless the entry is for some work-related purposes). Since 15 January 2013, Israel no longer stamps foreign passports at Ben Gurion Airport. Passports are still (as of 22 June 2017) stamped at Erez when passing into and out of Gaza.

Iran refuses admission to holders of passports containing an Israeli visa or stamp that is less than 12 months old.

=== Biometrics ===
Several countries mandate that all travellers, or all foreign travellers, be fingerprinted on arrival and will refuse admission to or even arrest travellers who refuse to comply. In some countries, such as the United States, this may apply even to transit passengers who merely wish to change planes rather than go landside.

Fingerprinting countries/regions include Afghanistan, Argentina, Brunei, Cambodia, China, Ethiopia, Ghana, Guinea, India, Japan, Kenya (both fingerprints and a photo are taken), Malaysia upon entry and departure, Mongolia, Saudi Arabia, the Schengen Area, Singapore, South Korea, Taiwan, Thailand, Uganda, the United Arab Emirates and the United States.

Many countries also require a photo be taken of people entering the country. The United States, which does not fully implement exit control formalities at its land frontiers (although long mandated by its own legislation), intends to implement facial recognition for passengers departing from international airports to identify people who overstay their visa.

Together with fingerprint and face recognition, iris scanning is one of three biometric identification technologies internationally standardised since 2006 by the International Civil Aviation Organization (ICAO) for use in e-passports and the United Arab Emirates conducts iris scanning on visitors who need to apply for a visa. The United States Department of Homeland Security has announced plans to greatly increase the biometric data it collects at US borders. In 2018, Singapore began trials of iris scanning at three land and maritime immigration checkpoints.

== Caribbean ==
- Visa policy toward Barbadians in the region
  - British
  - Dutch
  - French

== Notes ==
Notes

== See also ==
- Visa policy of Barbados
- Barbados passport
- Foreign relations of Barbados
