= Visa policy of Barbados =

Policy on permits required to enter Barbados

Most visitors to Barbados may enter without a visa. However, citizens of certain countries must obtain a visa from one of the Barbadian diplomatic missions.

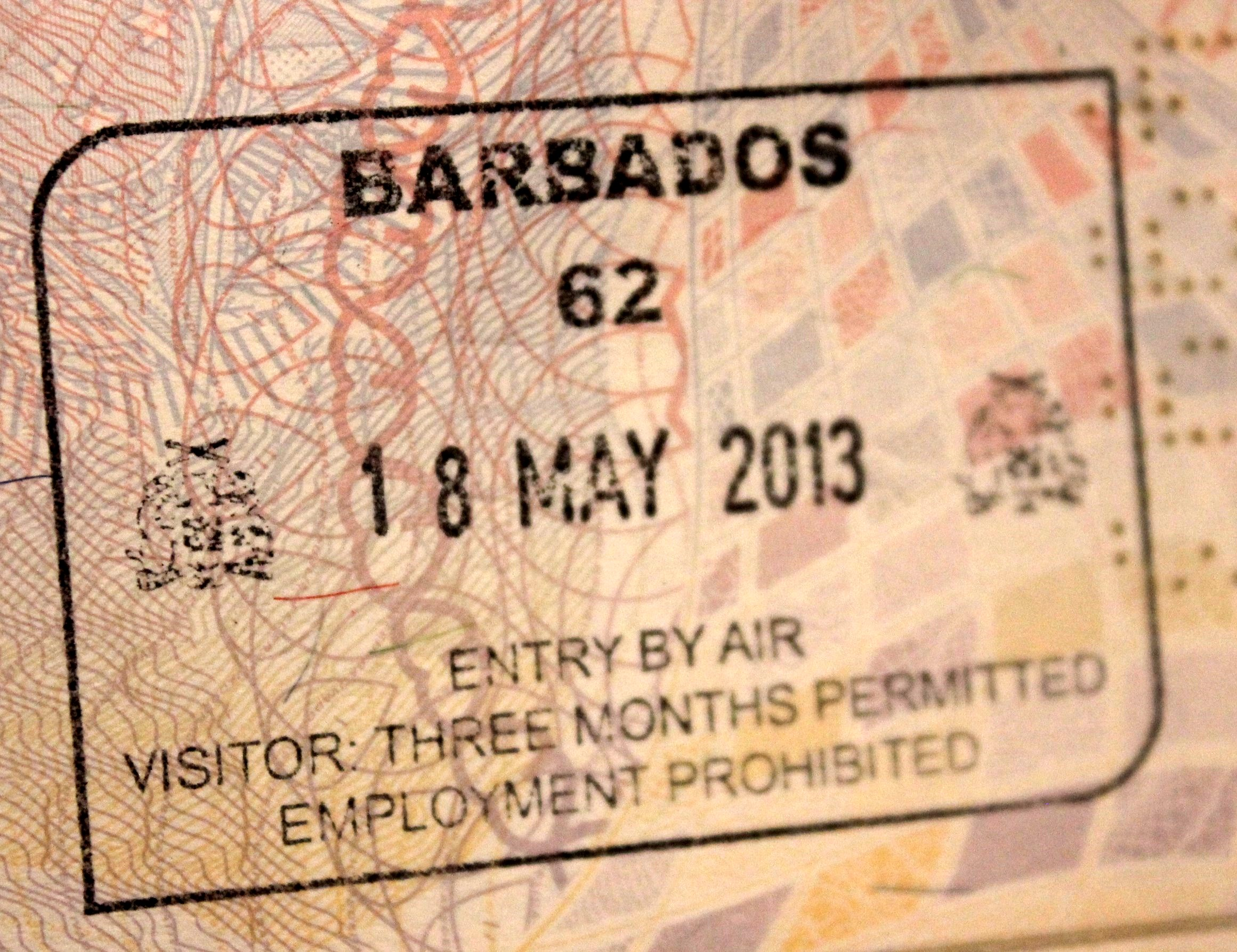
Entry stamp

== Visa policy map ==
Visa policy of Barbados Barbados Freedom of movement Visa not required (6 months) Visa not required (90 days) Visa not required (30 days) Visa not required (28 days) Visa required

== Visa exemption ==
=== Ordinary passports ===
Citizens of the following countries and territories may enter Barbados without a visa for the following period:

Freedom of movement

- Belize
- Dominica
- Saint Vincent and the Grenadines

6 months

- Antigua and Barbuda
- Australia
- Bahamas
- Bangladesh
- Botswana
- Brazil
- Brunei
- Canada
- Eswatini
- Fiji
- Gambia
- Ghana
- Grenada
- Guyana
- Iceland
- Ireland
- Israel
- Jamaica
- Kenya
- Kiribati
- Lesotho
- Liechtenstein
- Malawi
- Malaysia
- Maldives
- Mali
- Mauritania
- Mauritius
- New Zealand
- Norway
- Samoa
- San Marino
- Seychelles
- Sierra Leone
- Singapore
- Solomon Islands
- South Africa
- Sri Lanka
- Saint Kitts and Nevis
- Saint Lucia
- Suriname
- Switzerland
- Tanzania
- Tonga
- Trinidad and Tobago
- Tunisia
- Turkey
- Tuvalu
- Uganda
- United Kingdom
- United States
- Vanuatu
- Zambia
- Zimbabwe

90 days

- Algeria
- Andorra
- Angola
- Argentina
- Bahrain
- Benin
- Bhutan
- Bolivia
- Burkina Faso
- Burundi
- Cambodia
- Cameroon
- Cape Verde
- Central African Republic
- Chad
- Chile
- Colombia
- Comoros
- Republic of the Congo
- DR Congo
- Cook Islands
- Djibouti
- Ecuador
- Egypt
- El Salvador
- Equatorial Guinea
- Ethiopia
- Gabon
- Guatemala
- Guinea
- Guinea-Bissau
- Honduras
- Hong Kong
- India
- Indonesia
- Ivory Coast
- Japan
- Jordan
- Kuwait
- Lebanon
- Liberia
- Madagascar
- Monaco
- Mongolia
- Montenegro
- Morocco
- Marshall Islands
- Micronesia
- Mozambique
- Namibia
- Nauru
- Nepal
- Niger
- Nigeria
- North Macedonia
- Oman
- Pakistan
- Palau
- Panama
- Paraguay
- Philippines
- Qatar
- Rwanda
- São Tomé and Príncipe
- Saudi Arabia
- Senegal
- Serbia
- South Korea
- South Sudan
- Sudan
- Thailand
- Togo
- United Arab Emirates
- Uruguay
- Vietnam

90 days within any 180 days

- All European Union member states (except Ireland)

30 days

- China
- Costa Rica
- Macau

28 days

- Albania
- Armenia
- Azerbaijan
- Belarus
- Cuba
- Georgia
- Kazakhstan
- Kyrgyzstan
- Mexico
- Moldova
- Nicaragua
- Peru
- Russia
- Tajikistan
- Timor-Leste
- Turkmenistan
- Ukraine
- Uzbekistan
- Venezuela

Date of visa changes

Citizens of Antigua and Barbuda, Australia, Bahamas, Bangladesh, Belize, Botswana, Brunei, Canada, Dominica, Eswatini, Fiji, Gambia, Ghana, Grenada, Ireland, Jamaica, Japan, Kenya, Kiribati, Lesotho, Malawi, Malaysia, Maldives, Mauritius, New Zealand, Nigeria, Saint Kitts and Nevis, Saint Lucia, Saint Vincent and the Grenadines, Samoa, Seychelles, Sierra Leone, Singapore, Solomon Islands, Sri Lanka, Tanzania, Tonga, Trinidad and Tobago, Tuvalu, Uganda, United Kingdom, United States, Vanuatu, Zambia and Zimbabwe have never required a visa to enter Barbados.

- 18 September 1969: Israel
- 1 May 1970: Tunisia
- 9 November 1970: Turkey
- 6 January 1971: Switzerland and Liechtenstein
- 1 July 1971: Belgium, Luxembourg and Netherlands
- 5 July 1971: Colombia
- 28 September 1984: Argentina
- 19 July 1987: Venezuela
- 19 February 1993: Costa Rica
- 15 February 1996: Chile
- 19 February 1996: Cuba
- 25 April 1997: Uruguay
- 2 April 2003: Panama
- 1 December 2008: Mexico
- 25 September 2014: El Salvador
- 1 June 2017: China
- 26 October 2017: Hong Kong
- 16 May 2019: Bahrain, Burkina Faso, Burundi, Cameroon, Ethiopia, Ghana, Guatemala, India, Indonesia, Jordan, Liberia, Macao, Monaco, Morocco, Nigeria, Oman, Philippines, Qatar, Russia, Rwanda, Saudi Arabia, Senegal, Serbia, Thailand, Vietnam
- 28 July 2022: Algeria, Andorra, Angola, Benin, Bolivia, Cambodia, Cape Verde, Central Africa Republic, Chad, Comoros, Republic of Congo, Cook Islands, the Democratic Republic of the Congo, Côte d'Ivoire, Djibouti, Ecuador, Egypt, Equatorial Guinea, Gabon, Guinea, Guinea-Bissau, Honduras, Kuwait, Lebanon, Madagascar, Marshall Islands, Micronesia, Montenegro, Mongolia, Mozambique, Namibia, Nauru, Nepal, Niger, North Macedonia, Pakistan, Palau, Paraguay, São Tomé and Príncipe, Sudan, South Sudan and Togo

Cancelled:

- Brazil: 26 July 2021 (was resumed 3 January 2022)
- India: 26 July 2021 (was resumed 3 January 2022)
- Norway: March 2001 (was resumed)
- Haiti: 13 July 2019
- South Africa: 26 July 2021 (was resumed 3 January 2022)

In addition, citizens of Somalia holding a Titre de Voyage issued by the United Kingdom may enter Barbados without a visa for up to 28 days.

=== Non-ordinary passports ===
Holders of diplomatic, official and service passports issued by Albania (28 days), Armenia (28 days), Argentina, Belize (180 days), Brunei (180 days), Cambodia, Cuba (28 days), China (30 days), Costa Rica (30 days), Georgia (28 days), Haiti, Hong Kong, Macao (30 days), Malaysia (180 days), Mexico (30 days), Moldova (28 days), Nicaragua (28 days), Indonesia, Ireland (180 days), Japan, Senegal, Peru (28 days), Philippines, Singapore (180 days), Thailand, United Kingdom (180 days), Vietnam and Venezuela (28 days) may enter Barbados without a visa for up to 90 days (unless otherwise noted).

Holders of diplomatic, official and service passports issued by Azerbaijan, Belarus, Kazakhstan, Kyrgyzstan, Tajikistan, Timor-Leste, Turkmenistan, Ukraine and Uzbekistan require a valid diplomatic visa in advance.

== Visa required in advance ==
Citizens of the following countries must obtain a visa in advance prior to entering Barbados:

- Afghanistan
- Bosnia and Herzegovina
- Dominican Republic
- Eritrea
- Haiti
- Iran
- Iraq
- Kosovo
- Laos
- Libya
- Myanmar
- North Korea
- Palestine
- Papua New Guinea
- Somalia
- Syria
- Taiwan
- Vatican City
- Yemen

== Transit ==
Holders of passports issued by any country can transit visa-free for 24 hours (except Afghanistan)

== See also ==
- Visa requirements for Barbadian citizens
