= Barbadian Brazilians =

Total population
- 5,000

Regions with significant populations
- Porto Velho · Manaus · Belém

Languages
- Portuguese · Bajan Creole

Religion
- Major Roman Catholics; Animists · Protestants

Related ethnic groups
- Barbadian British · Barbadian Canadians

Barbadian Brazilians (Portuguese: Barbadiano-brasileiro) or Bajans, refers to Brazilian people of full, partial or predominantly Barbadian ancestry, or Barbadian-born people residing in Brazil.

At the beginning of the 20th century, many Barbadians worked in the Amazonas, Pará and Rondônia regions. There had been a mass exodus from the Caribbean in order to take part in the rubber boom, and the poor socio-economic conditions in Barbados at the time made Brazil an enticing place to search for a better life. In 1911 Roger Casement who was a British consular official at the time undertook a special investigation of the condition of Barbadian workers in the Putomayo Valley then part of Peru traveling to that region by going up the Amazon. The Barbadian presence is still evidenced through some surnames of British origin found in Brazil, such as Alleyne, Mottley, Maloney, Depeiza, Blackman and Layne.

== See also ==
- Caribbean Brazilian
- Barbados–Brazil relations
