= Caribbean British =

Caribbean British may refer to:

- British African-Caribbean people
- British Indo-Caribbean people, residents of the UK who were born on a Caribbean island and whose ancestors are indigenous to India
- British White Caribbean people, residents of the UK who were born on in the Caribbean or have ancestry there and whose ancestors originated from Europe.

== See also ==
- Caribbean Americans
- Caribbean Canadians
- Diaspora
