= Barbadian nationality law =

Barbadian Citizenship Act

Parliament of Barbados
- Long title: An Act relating to Barbadian citizenship
- Enacted by: Government of Barbados
- Status: Current legislation

Nationality law of Barbados is based on the principle of jus sanguinis. Barbadian citizenship may be acquired by descent or through naturalization. Barbadian law permits dual citizenship. A Barbadian national is eligible for more ease with Freedom of Movement in the Caribbean Community-bloc, and therefore may be entitled to the similar rights as other CARICOM citizens.

Barbadian nationality law is regulated by 1966 Constitution of Barbados, as amended; the Barbados Citizenship Act, as amended; and various British Nationality laws. These laws determine who is, or is eligible to be, a national of Barbados. Barbadian nationality is typically obtained under the rules of jus sanguinis, i.e. by birth to a father or in some cases, a mother, with Barbadian nationality. It can also be granted to persons with an affiliation to the country, or to a permanent resident who has lived in the country for a given period of time through naturalisation. There is currently no program in Barbados for citizenship by investment, though they do have a special work visa program. Nationality establishes one's international identity as a member of a sovereign nation. Though it is not synonymous with citizenship, rights granted under domestic law for domestic purposes, the United Kingdom, and thus the Commonwealth, has traditionally used the words interchangeably.

== Acquiring Barbadian nationality ==
Barbadians may acquire nationality through birth, naturalisation, or registration.

=== By birth ===
Birthright nationality applies to:

- Persons who were nationals of Britain (Citizens of the UK and Colonies) or were naturalised or registered in Barbados at the time of independence;
- Persons born within the territory after 29 November 1966 to at least one Barbadian parent, which is interpreted to include a mother only, in the case of illegitimacy, as long as the parents were not immune from legal processes, or an enemy alien; (Note: Unwed Barbadian fathers may not pass nationality to their children, according to section 10(2) of the Constitution. Married Barbadian men have no restrictions on where they were born for their children to derive their nationality. For a Barbadian woman to pass her nationality to her illegitimate child, she must have been born in Barbados.)
- Persons legitimately born abroad after 29 November 1966 to a father who was born in Barbados; or if illegitimate to a Barbadian-born mother; or (Note: If the mother of a child born abroad is married to a foreign man, her children are unable to derive her nationality unless she was born in Barbados.)
- Persons born upon an aircraft or ship which is registered in Barbados or an unregistered aircraft or ship belonging to the government.

=== By registration ===
Nationality by registration includes those who have familial or historic relationship affiliations with Barbados. Persons who acquire nationality by registration include:

- Foundlings who have always been stateless and were born in the territory;
- Adoptees at the issuance of an adoption order for a minor, but if it is a joint adoption, the child can only derive nationality from the father;
- Persons who before 30 November 1966 were Commonwealth nationals and who had lived in Barbados for seven years;
- Persons who are nationals of other Commonwealth countries or Ireland and who have lived in Barbados or worked in government service for at least five years;
- Women who were married to a national who acquired nationality at the time of independence, or but for death would have acquired nationality, upon taking an Oath of Allegiance; (Note: Foreign men who are married to Barbadian women are not allowed to derive nationality from a Barbadian spouse by registration.)
- Post-independence, the wife of a national who acquired nationality after independence, provided she resides with her husband and takes an Oath of Allegiance; or
- Minor children of any national, at the discretion of the Minister for Immigration.

=== By naturalisation ===
Ordinary naturalisation in Barbados can be obtained by adult persons of legal capacity, who in the 12 months prior to submitting an application resided in the territory, are of good character, and intend to be a resident of the territory. Residency of a minimum of five years is required. Applicants petition the Minister for Immigration, who evaluates whether the general criteria are met and whether the applicant poses a threat to national security or public policy. Upon approval, applicants must take an Oath of Allegiance.

== Loss of nationality ==
Barbados allows its nationals to voluntarily renounce their nationality if they are possessed of 21 years of age and legal capacity. They must verify that they have other nationality, which is not derived from a country in a state of war with Barbados. Renunciation may not be allowed if such action would pose a threat to the nation. Nationals may be deprived of their status through acts of treason or disloyalty, criminal offences, fraud in a naturalisation application, or performing services for a foreign military or government.

== Dual nationality ==
The constitution of 1966 recognised dual nationality.

== History ==
=== Colonial period (1536–1966) ===
The indigenous Arawak and Carib peoples had disappeared from the island when the Portuguese sailor, Pedro a Campos, landed on Barbados in 1536. British sailors claimed to have landed there in 1620, but it was not claimed by England until 1625. In Britain, allegiance, in which subjects pledged to support a monarch, was the precursor to the modern concept of nationality. The Crown recognised from 1350 that all persons born within the territories of the British Empire were subjects. Those born outside the realm – except children of those serving in an official post abroad, children of the monarch, and children born on a British sailing vessel – were considered by common law to be foreigners. Marriage did not affect the status of a subject of the realm. In 1627, eighty settlers and ten slaves, led by William Courten, established a colony on the leeward side of the island. During the Wars of the Three Kingdoms, the royal patent which had been issued by Charles I was suspended in 1652, when Oliver Cromwell's forces took control of the island. Upon restoration of the monarchy the patent holders agreed to exchange their patent, in 1660, for an entitlement to export fees, and Barbados passed into the realm of the crown.

Unlike other colonial powers with slave societies in the Caribbean, the British did not have a single slave code. Each British colony was allowed to establish its own rules about the slave trade, and a code was established for Barbados in 1661. The highly stratified society, separated by race, was significantly further divided by class distinctions with landowning elites dominating power structures. By the late 18th century, the cultural model included in descending power, British Europeans; other Europeans; Euro-creole, people of European descent born on the island; free coloured persons; Afro-creole, people of African descent who were born and acculturated in Barbados; and recently arrived Africans. Married women were subjugated to the authority of their husbands under coverture, and the law was structured to maintain social hierarchies by regulating familial matters like, who could marry, legitimacy, and inheritance. Children in slave societies followed the status of the mother, thus if she was free her children would be free or if she was in bondage, her children would also be bound.

Other than common law, there was no standard statutory law which applied for subjects throughout the realm, meaning different jurisdictions created their own legislation for local conditions, which often conflicted with the laws in other jurisdictions in the empire. (Note: For example, in Barbadian law, slaves were considered to be part of the real estate. As Britain had no slave code and a person could not be land in common law, a slave taken from Barbados to England and later wrongfully taken created debate as to how damages for taking were to be assessed. Chamberlain v. Harvey questioned whether slaves were marketable chattel, or whether trespass laws were violated, finally settling on a statute per quod servitium amisit dealing with the interference of an apprenticed labourer so as to render them unable to perform services to their employer.) Nationality laws passed by the British Parliament were extended only to the Kingdom of Great Britain, and later the United Kingdom of Great Britain and Ireland. In 1807, the British Parliament passed the Slave Trade Act, barring the Atlantic slave trade in the empire. The Act did not abolish slavery, which did not end until the 1833 Emancipation Act went into effect in 1834. Under its terms, slaves were converted into apprentices and remained bound to their former owners for four years if they had worked in the home and for six years if they had been field labourers. The system was difficult to administer and apprenticeship for all former slaves ended in Barbados in 1838. Though free, there was never a British plan to give former slaves a voice in Parliament, leaving them as British subjects in a highly stratified system of rights. Denied political and economic rights, former slaves were not entitled to formal recognition as nationals by other nations.

In 1911, at the Imperial Conference a decision was made to draft a common nationality code for use across the empire. The British Nationality and Status of Aliens Act 1914 allowed local jurisdictions in the self-governing Dominions to continue regulating nationality in their territories, but also established an imperial nationality scheme throughout the realm. The uniform law, which went into effect on 1 January 1915, required a married woman to derive her nationality from her spouse, meaning if he was British, she was also, and if he was foreign, so was she. It stipulated that upon loss of nationality of a husband, a wife could declare that she wished to remain British and provided that if a marriage had terminated, through death or divorce, a British-born national who had lost her status through marriage could reacquire British nationality through naturalisation without meeting a residency requirement. The statute reiterated common law provisions for natural-born persons born within the realm on or after the effective date. By using the word person, the statute nullified legitimacy requirements for jus soli nationals. For those born abroad on or after the effective date, legitimacy was still required, and could only be derived by a child from a British father (one generation), who was natural-born or naturalised. Naturalisations required five years residence or service to the crown.

Amendments were enacted in 1918, 1922, 1933 and 1943 changing derivative nationality by descent and modifying slightly provisions for women to lose their nationality upon marriage. Because of a rise in statelessness, a woman who did not automatically acquire her husband's nationality upon marriage or upon his naturalisation in another country, did not lose their British status after 1933. The 1943 revision allowed a child born abroad at any time to be a British national by descent if the Secretary of State agreed to register the birth. Under the terms of the British Nationality Act 1948 British nationals in Barbados were reclassified at that time as "Citizens of the UK and Colonies" (CUKC). The basic British nationality scheme did not change overmuch, and typically those who were previously defined as British remained the same. Changes included that wives and children no longer automatically acquired the status of the husband or father, children who acquired nationality by descent no longer were required to make a retention declaration, and registrations for children born abroad were extended.

In 1958, Barbados joined the West Indies Federation. The federation, which included Antigua, Barbados, Dominica, Grenada, Jamaica, Montserrat, Saint Christopher-Nevis-Anguilla, Saint Lucia, Saint Vincent, and Trinidad and Tobago, was typically seen by its supporters as a means to use a federal structure to gain national independence and eventual recognition as a Dominion. The federation was unable to develop a unified nationality scheme, as member states tended to identify with their specific island, rather than by region. Jamaica withdrew from the federation in 1961 and that year Barbados became self-governing. Despite attempts by Barbados and Trinidad and Tobago to keep the federation together, it collapsed in 1962. Statutes passed by the Barbadian parliament after 1960, transformed the economy, earning the country the confidence of the international monetary market. The political and financial stability of the nation, led to an Independence Conference with the British government and Barbados gaining full independence as of 30 November 1966.

=== Post-independence (1966–present) ===
Generally, persons who had previously been nationals as defined under the classification of "Citizens of the UK and Colonies", in the 1948 Nationality Act, would become nationals of Barbados on Independence Day. Exceptions were made for persons to retain their British nationality and status if they (or their father or grandfather) were born, naturalised, or registered in a part of the realm which remained on 1 November part of the United Kingdom or colonies, had been annexed by such a place, or was a British protectorate. Divergences from the 1948 Act included that CUKCs by descent only acquired Barbadian nationality if their father was born in Barbados and that women retained or lost their Barbadian nationality based upon their spouse's status and were prohibited from maintaining British status as registered wives, if their spouse lost his CUKC status. (Note: Fransman states, "CUKC women generally retained or lost that citizenship [status] if or when the husband did and the registration entitlement contained in s 6(2) of the BNA 1948 was withdrawn from women whose husbands ceased to be CUKC on 30 November 1966 or who would have so ceased had they lived".) From independence forward, women who married Barbadian men could choose to register for Barbadian nationality.

Both the Constitution of 1966 and the 1966 Citizenship Act made distinctions between legitimate and illegitimate children. In 1979, the Status of Children Reform Act eliminated the common law status of illegitimacy for children born after 1 January 1980. Other changes enacted, like the Domicile Reform Act 1980, giving married women the choice of where they lived; Income Tax Amendment Act 1980, granting women separate tax assessment; and Married Persons Act 1980, allowing married women to acquire property and bring suit by her own right for her property, removed gendered legal inequalities that still existed under coverture in Barbadian law. The Domicile reform had implications for nationality as it no longer required married women to have the same permanent residence as their spouse. Constitutional amendments in 2000 removed some of the gendered provisions; however, as of 2017, gender imbalances in the Constitution were still present and neither the amendment of 2019 nor 2020 rectified nationality inequality. Barbados Minister of Home Affairs, Edmund Hinkson announced in 2020 that proposals to reform the Immigration Act were being drafted and should be considered by Parliament in 2021. The ideas under discussion would broaden eligibility for nationality through descent to grand parents and great-grandparents, change length of residency requirements, and provide provisions for broader acquisition of permanent residency.

== See also ==
- Barbados National Pledge
- British nationality law
- Citizenship
- Nationality law
