= List of heritage sites of the Helderberg area =

Sites recognised ny SAHRA

This is a list of heritage sites in the Helderberg region of in the Western Cape, as recognized by the South African Heritage Resource Agency.

SAHRA identifier	Site name	Description	Town	District	NHRA status	Coordinates	Image
9/2/083/0001	Old Dutch Reformed Church, Church Street, Somerset West	The old Dutch Reformed Church in Somerset West is situated between Church and Victoria Streets, not far from the main street. The congregation of Hottentots Holland was established in 1819, three years before the town of Somerset West came into being. Type of site: Church; Current use: Church. The Church was consecrated in 1820 by the Rev. Meent Borcherds of Stellenbosch and was restored in 1863 and 1963. It is proclaimed a monument on account of its history and its remarkable architecture	Cape Town, Somerset West	Somerset West	Provincial Heritage Site	34°05′12″S 18°50′47″E	The old Dutch Reformed Church in Somerset West is situated between Church and Victoria Streets, not far from the main street. The congregation of Hottentots Holland was established in 1819, three years before the town of Somerset West came into being. Type of site: Church Current use: Church. The Church was consecrated in 1820 by the Rev. Meent Borcherds of Stellenbosch and was restored in 1863 and 1963. It is proclaimed a monument on account of its history and its remarkable architecture
9/2/083/0002	Parel Vallei, Aberdeen Road, Somerset West	In the immediate vicinity of Somerset West lie a number of old historic farms with their Cape-Dutch homesteads which fill every lover of the Boland with nostalgia. One of these farms is Parel Vallei. Parel Vallei Road branches off the main road inside Som Architectural style: Cape Gabled, with significant layering. Type of site: House. Current use: Farm.	Cape Town, Somerset West	Somerset West	Provincial Heritage Site	34°04′02″S 18°51′19″E	Upload Photo
9/2/083/0003	Bridgewater Manor, Somerset West		Somerset West	Somerset West		34°05′23″S 18°51′20″E	Upload Photo
9/2/083/0004	SOMERSET WEST MUNICIPAL AREA, GENERAL		Somerset West	Somerset West			Upload Photo
9/2/083/0005	Helderberg College Road: Avenue of Trees, Somerset West		Somerset West	Somerset West		34°03′38″S 18°50′16″E	
9/2/083/0006	Morgenster, Lourens Road, Somerset West District	The house is H-shaped with 6 really perfect gables; the front gable (recently well rebuilt) is dated 1786 and shows the holbol style at its most beautiful, with convex edge mouldings continued onto the gable face and ending as fully developed scrolls, the nucleus of this farm consisted of the third of the 4 parts into which Vergelegen was divided after the recall of Willem Adriaan van der Stel; it was bought by Jacques Malan. Malan’s daughter Catharina married Willem Morkel of Onverwacht, and their son Architectural style: Cape Gabled. Type of site: Farmstead; Current use: Farm. Originally part of the farm Vergelegen that was granted to Governor Willem Adriaan van der Stel in 1700, this portion was purchased in 1708 by Jacques Malan after Van der Stel's recall. The erection of the main buildings is attributed to members of the Ma	Cape Town	Somerset West	Provincial Heritage Site	34°04′42″S 18°52′01″E	Upload Photo
9/2/083/0006/01	Upper Morgenster, remainder of Farm 1319, Morgenster, Somerset West		Somerset West	Somerset West		34°05′02″S 18°53′06″E	Upload Photo
9/2/083/0007	Gantouw Pass, Somerset West District	The occupation of the Hottentots Holland Valley by Willem Adriaan van der Stel halted the eastward expansion of the Colony for a time and it was only after his dismissal in 1707 that the trek over the Hottentots Holland Mountains began. Type of site: Pass	Cape Town	Somerset West	Provincial Heritage Site	34°08′21″S 18°56′25″E	The occupation of the Hottentots Holland Valley by Willem Adriaan van der Stel halted the eastward expansion of the Colony for a time and it was only after his dismissal in 1707 that the trek over the Hottentots Holland Mountains began. Type of site: Pass
9/2/083/0008	Voorburg, Victoria Street, Somerset West	Architectural style: Cape Gabled. Current use: Commercial.	Cape Town, Somerset West	Somerset West	Provincial Heritage Site	34°05′25″S 18°50′20″E	Upload Photo
9/2/083/0009	Zandvliet, Faure, Somerset West		Somerset West	Somerset West			Upload Photo
9/2/083/0010	Vergelegen, Somerset West		Somerset West	Somerset West		34°04′38″S 18°51′43″E	Media related to Camphor trees, Vergelegen at Wikimedia Commons
9/2/083/0010/001	Camphor trees, Vergelegen, Somerset West	The historical farm Vergelegen lies a few kilometres due east of Somerset West in an angle between the Hottentots Holland Mountains and the Helderberg. It was granted to Governor Willem Adriaan van der Stel by the visiting Commissioner Wouter Valckenier. Type of site: Tree	Cape Town, Somerset West	Somerset West	Provincial Heritage Site	34°04′38″S 18°53′00″E	The historical farm Vergelegen lies a few kilometres due east of Somerset West in an angle between the Hottentots Holland Mountains and the Helderberg. It was granted to Governor Willem Adriaan van der Stel by the visiting Commissioner Wouter Valckenier. Type of site: Tree Media related to Camphor trees, Vergelegen at Wikimedia Commons
9/2/083/0011	SIR LOWRY'S PASS VILLAGE, SOMERSET WEST DISTRICT, GENERAL		Somerset West	Somerset West			
9/2/083/0011/001	Railway Station, Sir Lowry's Pass Village	Type of site: Railway Station. Current use: Railway station.	Cape Town, Sir Lowry's Pass Village	Somerset West	Provincial Heritage Site	34°07′05″S 18°54′34″E	Type of site: Railway Station. Current use: Railway station.
9/2/083/0011/003	Sweet Safraan, Sir Lowry's Pass Village, Somerset West District	The original dwelling consisted of a central passage with two rooms leading off it on either side, making it a four room house with a thatched roof, At a later date two more rooms were built onto the right-hand side leading directly out of the original t The property on which this dwelling—house is situated, originally formed part of a freehold grant to C.F.Prenger from Cologne in 1779 and named Frederiksburg. It was subdivided in 1830 and this portion came in the possession of the widow J.C whose husband Type of site: Farmstead The original portion of this victorianised dwelling-house probably dates from the beginning of the nineteenth century. The house is situated on property which was originally granted to G. F. Prenger in 1779.	Cape Town, Sir Lowry's Pass	Somerset West	Provincial Heritage Site	34°07′08″S 18°54′33″E	The original dwelling consisted of a central passage with two rooms leading off it on either side, making it a four room house with a thatched roof, At a later date two more rooms were built onto the right-hand side leading directly out of the original t The property on which this dwelling—house is situated, originally formed part of a freehold grant to C.F.Prenger from Cologne in 1779 and named Frederiksburg. It was subdivided in 1830 and this portion came in the possession of the widow J.C whose husband Type of site: Farmstead The original portion of this victorianised dwelling-house probably dates from the beginning of the nineteenth century. The house is situated on property which was originally granted to G. F. Prenger in 1779.
9/2/083/0011/2	Old Primary School, Sir Lowry's Pass Village, Somerset West District		Somerset West	Somerset West		34°07′13″S 18°54′24″E	Upload Photo
9/2/083/0012	Predikants Square, Somerset West	Type of site: Public open space. Current use: Park.	Cape Town, Somerset West	Somerset West	Provincial Heritage Site	34°05′03″S 18°50′29″E	Type of site: Public open space. Current use: Park.
9/2/083/0013	Old Dovecot, Farm 811, Overwacht (De Bosch/Die Bos), Somerset West District		Somerset West	Somerset West			
9/2/083/0013/001	Old Dovecot, Onverwacht 811, Somerset West District	Type of site: Dovecote This dovecot is a particularly good example of the dovecots often built on old farms.	Cape Town	Somerset West	Provincial Heritage Site	33°54′43″S 18°24′57″E	Upload Photo
9/2/083/0014	Dreamer's Tavern Coach Restaurant, 51 Victoria Road, Somerset West		Somerset West	Somerset West		34°05′10″S 18°50′48″E	Upload Photo
9/2/083/0015	Dennegeur, Somerset West		Somerset West	Somerset West		34°05′49″S 18°52′08″E	Upload Photo
9/2/083/0016	Old Lourens River Bridge, Main Street, Somerset West	This bridge, which is situated just where the main road to the Strand and Sir Lowry’s Pass leaves the town of Somerset West, marks an important event in the history of communications in South Africa. Type of site: Bridge. Current use: Bridge.	Cape Town, Somerset West	Somerset West	Provincial Heritage Site	34°05′00″S 18°51′00″E	This bridge, which is situated just where the main road to the Strand and Sir Lowry’s Pass leaves the town of Somerset West, marks an important event in the history of communications in South Africa. Type of site: Bridge. Current use: Bridge. Media related to Old Lourens River Bridge at Wikimedia Commons
9/2/083/0017	Somerset House Preparatory School, Somerset West	The original purchaser of this property was Catherine, widow of Gerrit Cloete, who gave the farm the name of Cloetenberg. In 1725 Cloetenberg was transferred to C. Louw and his Deed of Transfer contains the first recorded reference to a house on the property Type of site: School; Previous use: House. Current use: School. This property originally formed part of the farm Cloetenberg which was bought in 1709 by Catharina Cloete. The oldest section of the building complex dates from 1725 and the front gable of the homestead bears the date 1785.	Cape Town, Somerset West	Somerset West	Provincial Heritage Site	34°04′43″S 18°51′12″E	Upload Photo
9/2/083/0018	Land-en-Zeezicht, 15 Verster Avenue, Somerset West	The homestead on Land en-Zeezicht is H-shaped; its main gable, at the present back of the house, is dated 1834, and shows the signs of Its late date: the Inner pilasters are rather close together while the winged scrolls have grown out of proportion. The In 1893 it came into the possession of J. J. Hendriks, the nephew of D. Buissini of Erinvale. Type of site: Farmstead	Cape Town, Somerset West	Somerset West	Provincial Heritage Site	34°04′19″S 18°52′32″E	The homestead on Land en-Zeezicht is H-shaped; its main gable, at the present back of the house, is dated 1834, and shows the signs of Its late date: the Inner pilasters are rather close together while the winged scrolls have grown out of proportion. The In 1893 it came into the possession of J. J. Hendriks, the nephew of D. Buissini of Erinvale. Type of site: Farmstead
9/2/083/0019	Erinvale, Lourensford Road, Somerset West		Somerset West	Somerset West		34°04′24″S 18°53′18″E	Upload Photo
9/2/083/0020	Dwelling and watermill, Knorhoek, Somerset West District	This is a most unusual house in more than one aspect. According to the ground plan the house was originally H—shaped but was turned into a rectangle and covered by a roof with a ridge in front and three parallel ridges behind it running from back to front The farm Knorhoek was granted to David Malan in 1717 and was slightly over six morgen in extent. It was transferred, along with De Fortuin, to his son Jacques Malan in 1790, and a year later to François Joubert, who built the house in 1795. Type of site: Water Mill; Previous use: Mill. This imposing Cape Dutch manor-house together with the adjacent watermill forms a unique architectural complex.	Cape Town	Somerset West	Provincial Heritage Site	33°55′30″S 18°25′27″E	Upload Photo
9/2/083/0021	Old Dutch Reformed Church Parsonage, 41 Lourens Street, Somerset West	This parsonage building, which was erected in 1819, was enlarged and rebuilt in true Victorian style in 1848 at the request of Dr J. F. Reitz after his appointment as minister to the congregation. Hereafter it served as parsonage until 1948. Type of site: Pastorie; Previous use: Parsonage. Current use: Restaurant.	Cape Town, Somerset West	Somerset West	Provincial Heritage Site	34°05′18″S 18°50′51″E	This parsonage building, which was erected in 1819, was enlarged and rebuilt in true Victorian style in 1848 at the request of Dr J. F. Reitz after his appointment as minister to the congregation. Hereafter it served as parsonage until 1948. Type of site: Pastorie Previous use: Parsonage. Current use: Restaurant.
9/2/083/0022	Lourens Street, Somerset West		Somerset West	Somerset West		34°05′23″S 18°50′39″E	Upload Photo
9/2/083/0023	Police Station, 124 Main Street, Somerset West	This U-shaped building has a feature peculiar to Hottentots Holland; namely a front gable with small distinctive 'thumb wings' reduced to the width of the edge- mould only. The Police Station, originally a dwelling-house, probably dates from between 1835 Architectural style: Cape Gabled. Type of site: Police Station. Current use: Police station.	Cape Town, Somerset West	Somerset West	Provincial Heritage Site	34°04′55″S 18°50′59″E	This U-shaped building has a feature peculiar to Hottentots Holland; namely a front gable with small distinctive 'thumb wings' reduced to the width of the edge- mould only. The Police Station, originally a dwelling-house, probably dates from between 1835 Architectural style: Cape Gabled. Type of site: Police Station. Current use: Police station.
9/2/083/0024	Magistrate's office, 126 Main Street, Somerset West	Architecturally the court are a fine example of the public building style at the turn of the century. The colonnaded front facade has two extending rooms and stoepkamers on either side. These extending facades have low triangular pediments with a rather a Somerset West became an assistant Magistracy under Stellenbosch in 1892 with Mr. J. St. Vincent Cripps as first assistant magistrate. In 1898 a courthouse building which also housed the post office was completed. Somerset West. by this time having become Architectural style: Edwardian. Type of site: Magistrates Office; Previous use: Residence. Current use: Civic. This building was erected in 1898. It originally housed the post office, as well as the magistrate's court, after Somerset West was proclaimed an Assistant Magistracy in 1892.	Cape Town, Somerset West	Somerset West	Provincial Heritage Site	34°04′55″S 18°50′59″E	Architecturally the court are a fine example of the public building style at the turn of the century. The colonnaded front facade has two extending rooms and stoepkamers on either side. These extending facades have low triangular pediments with a rather a Somerset West became an assistant Magistracy under Stellenbosch in 1892 with Mr. J. St. Vincent Cripps as first assistant magistrate. In 1898 a courthouse building which also housed the post office was completed. Somerset West. by this time having become Architectural style: Edwardian. Type of site: Magistrates Office Previous use: Residence. Current use: Civic. This building was erected in 1898. It originally housed the post office, as well as the magistrate's court, after Somerset West was proclaimed an Assistant Magistracy in 1892.
9/2/083/0025	Standard Bank Building, Main Street, Somerset West		Somerset West	Somerset West		34°05′08″S 18°51′10″E	Upload Photo
9/2/083/0026	Broadlands, Sir Lowry's Pass, Somerset West District		Somerset West	Somerset West		34°07′25″S 18°52′28″E	Upload Photo
9/2/083/0027	Quinan House, Somerset West District		Somerset West	Somerset West			Upload Photo
9/2/083/0028	Groot Paardevlei, Somerset West	On the outskirts of Somerset West the old Firgrove Road branches off the road to Stellenbosch. A couple of kilo- metres further on and to the right the large group of buildings belonging to the farm Groot Paardevlei is situated. Type of site: Farmstead	Cape Town, Somerset West	Somerset West	Provincial Heritage Site	34°05′20″S 18°49′56″E	Upload Photo
9/2/083/0029	Vergenoegd, Faure, Somerset West District	The house is an incomplete H, with a missing right back wing; it is however evident that this wing once existed. The front gable is identical to one of the outbuildings' at Spier, and is a good example of a gable with a purely holbol outline with the edge One of the early owners, Lambert Myburgh is likely to have built this house or enlarged an existing house in about 1745. This farm had first been granted in 1696 to Pieter de Vos; After various transfers, it became the property of Johannes Nicolaas Colyn; Type of site: Farmstead The earliest section of this H-shape dwelling- house with its impressive gables probably dates from the middle of the 18th century. The farmyard is bounded by a ring-wall and an interesting complex of outbuildings	Cape Town	Somerset West	Provincial Heritage Site	34°02′05″S 18°44′21″E	The house is an incomplete H, with a missing right back wing; it is however evident that this wing once existed. The front gable is identical to one of the outbuildings' at Spier, and is a good example of a gable with a purely holbol outline with the edge One of the early owners, Lambert Myburgh is likely to have built this house or enlarged an existing house in about 1745. This farm had first been granted in 1696 to Pieter de Vos; After various transfers, it became the property of Johannes Nicolaas Colyn Type of site: Farmstead The earliest section of this H-shape dwelling- house with its impressive gables probably dates from the middle of the 18th century. The farmyard is bounded by a ring-wall and an interesting complex of outbuildings
9/2/083/0030	The Old Cottage, 23 Andries Pretorius Street, Somerset West		Somerset West	Somerset West		34°05′22″S 18°51′12″E	Upload Photo
9/2/083/0032	Marina Farm, Almond Drive, Somerset West District		Somerset West	Somerset West			Upload Photo
9/2/083/0033	Navarre, Firgrove, Somerset West District	Navarre is a small H—shaped house, one back wing being a new addition. The facade of the house which is one of the finest in the Cape has one full—width and one— half—width window on each side of the door: the windows are casements, small – only four rows	Cape Town, Firgrove	Somerset West	Provincial Heritage Site	34°03′22″S 18°47′18″E	Upload Photo
9/2/083/0034	MACASSAR LOCAL AREA, GENERAL		Somerset West	Somerset West			Upload Photo
9/2/083/0035	The Sheikh Yusuf Kramat, Faure, Somerset West District		Somerset West	Somerset West		34°03′52″S 18°45′03″E	
9/2/083/0036	SOMERSET WEST MAGISTERIAL DISTRICT (Croyden, Sir Lowry's Pass, etc)		Somerset West	Somerset West			Upload Photo
9/2/083/0037	AECI Site, Somerset West	What was once the De Beers Explosive Works — one of the largest dynamite factories on earth — now anchors the Paardevlei Precinct, a modern mixed-use development breathing new life into Somerset West's industrial past.	Somerset West	Somerset West		34°05′27″S 18°48′25″E	What was once the De Beers Explosive Works — one of the largest dynamite factories on earth — now anchors the Paardevlei Precinct, a modern mixed-use development breathing new life into Somerset West's industrial past. Media related to AECI Site dynamite factory at Wikimedia Commons
9/2/083/0037/001	Quinan House, Inner De Beers Avenue, AECI, Somerset West	The house has a front facade with two triangular end gables at each side. The roof is steeply sloping and the gables are therefore high. Beneath each end gable is an oriel window. Despite the fact that the plaster detail the oriel windows is not particular The high price of dynamite burdened the mining industry at the turn of the century and Rhodes suggested in 1898 that De Beers manufacture its own explosives. Early in 1900 the Stellenbosch Divisional Council granted De Beers Consolidated Mines Ltd a provi Type of site: House The gracious homestead was designed by the firm Baker and Masey and built in 1901 as residence for the factory manager of De Beers Cape Explosive Works. The first two general managers were William Quinan and Kenneth Quinan, after who the house was named f	Cape Town, AECI, Somerset West	Somerset West	Provincial Heritage Site	34°05′00″S 18°51′00″E	The house has a front facade with two triangular end gables at each side. The roof is steeply sloping and the gables are therefore high. Beneath each end gable is an oriel window. Despite the fact that the plaster detail the oriel windows is not particular The high price of dynamite burdened the mining industry at the turn of the century and Rhodes suggested in 1898 that De Beers manufacture its own explosives. Early in 1900 the Stellenbosch Divisional Council granted De Beers Consolidated Mines Ltd a provi Type of site: House The gracious homestead was designed by the firm Baker and Masey and built in 1901 as residence for the factory manager of De Beers Cape Explosive Works. The first two general managers were William Quinan and Kenneth Quinan, after who the house was named f Media related to Quinan House, Somerset West at Wikimedia Commons
9/2/083/0038	Fleur Du Cap, Lourensford Road, Somerset West		Somerset West	Somerset West			Upload Photo
9/2/083/0039	San Gabriel Farm, Farm 583, Somerset West District	Granted to Paul Hartog, jr in 1759, and was 2 morgen in size. He had built the house 3 years earlier. It has a simple holbol gable of the earliest type; together with that of Joostenburg it is one of the 2 earliest surviving dated gables – both were built Type of site: Farm Complex The front gable is one of the two earliest dated gables at the Cape, dated 1756. Interesting historical features include exceptional camphor and yellowwood doors, and old ceiling boards and beams. The farm is situated within a historically important rura	Cape Town	Somerset West	Register	33°55′30″S 18°25′27″E	Upload Photo
9/2/083/0040	Methodist Mission Church, Somerset West		Somerset West	Somerset West		34°05′09″S 18°50′58″E	
9/2/083/0040/001	Coachman's Cottage, 23 Andries Pretorius Street, Somerset West	The Coachman' s Cottage was one of several cottages which were built by freed slaves on Wesleyan Church land in the 1830s. The land. is still owned by the Methodist Church, while the cottages are held by the owners in perpetual lease hold. The cottages h Type of site: House; Current use: Office. This cottage, designed in a simple vernacular style, is one of several built by freed slaves in the eighteen thirties.	Cape Town, Somerset West	Somerset West	Provincial Heritage Site	34°05′22″S 18°51′12″E	The Coachman' s Cottage was one of several cottages which were built by freed slaves on Wesleyan Church land in the 1830s. The land. is still owned by the Methodist Church, while the cottages are held by the owners in perpetual lease hold. The cottages h Type of site: House Current use: Office. This cottage, designed in a simple vernacular style, is one of several built by freed slaves in the eighteen thirties.
9/2/083/0041	Bredell House, Helderberg Village, Bredell Road, Somerset West District	This Victorian farmhouse contributes to the area because it has retained its architectural character and most of its original joinery. Its setting at the entrance to a modern development contributes to the importance of having the character of this origin	Cape Town	Somerset West	Register	34°02′45″S 18°48′45″E	Upload Photo
9/2/083/0042	Lwandle Hostel, Somerset West Dist		Somerset West	Somerset West			Upload Photo
9/2/083/0043	Lourensford Estate, Lourensford Road, Erf 471, Somerset West		Somerset West	Somerset West		34°04′19″S 18°53′19″E	Upload Photo
9/2/089/0001	STRAND MUNICIPAL AREA, GENERAL		Strand	Stellenbosch			Upload Photo
9/2/089/0002	Post Office, Beach Road, Gordon's Bay	Type of site: Post Office. Current use: Post office.	Cape Town, Gordon's Bay	Strand	Register	34°09′45″S 18°51′52″E	Type of site: Post Office. Current use: Post office.
9/2/089/0003	Police Station, Beach Road, Gordon's Bay	Type of site: Police Station. Current use: Police station.	Cape Town, Gordon's Bay	Strand	Register	34°09′45″S 18°51′52″E	Type of site: Police Station. Current use: Police station.
9/2/089/0004	Old Synagogue, 49 Westley Street, Strand	Type of site: Religious. Current Use: Residential.	Strand	Strand		34°06′55″S 18°49′28″E	Type of site: Religious. Current Use: Residential.
9/2/089/0005	GORDONS BAY MUNICIPAL AREA, STRAND DISTRICT, GENERAL		Gordon's Bay	Stellenbosch			Upload Photo

== See also ==
- Cape Dutch architecture
- Heritage Western Cape
- Stellenbosch Museum
