= Dutch gable =

Roof architectural feature originating in northeastern Europe

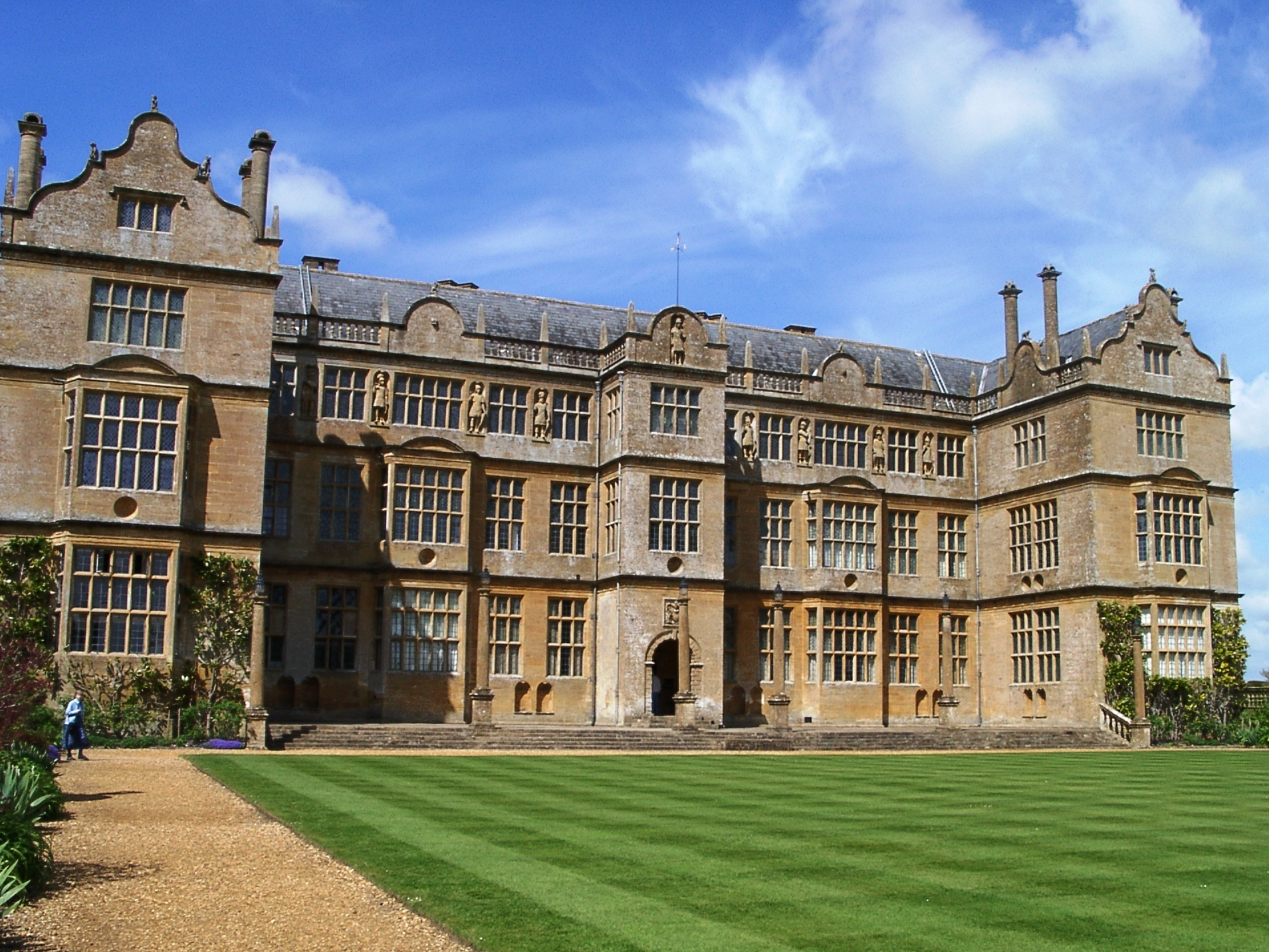
Dutch gables of varying complexity decorate the garden facade of Montacute House built circa 1598

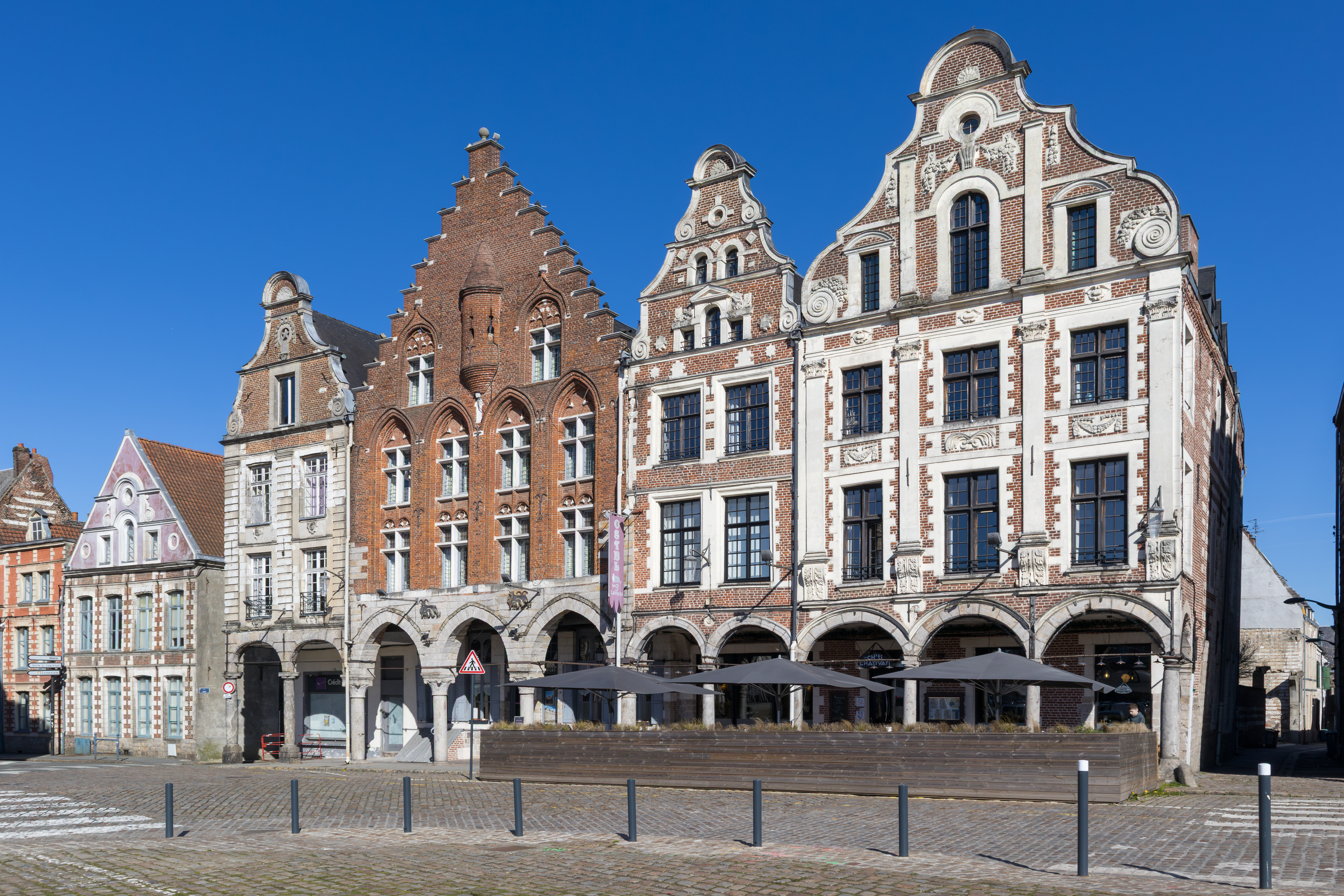
Typical facade in Arras, northern France

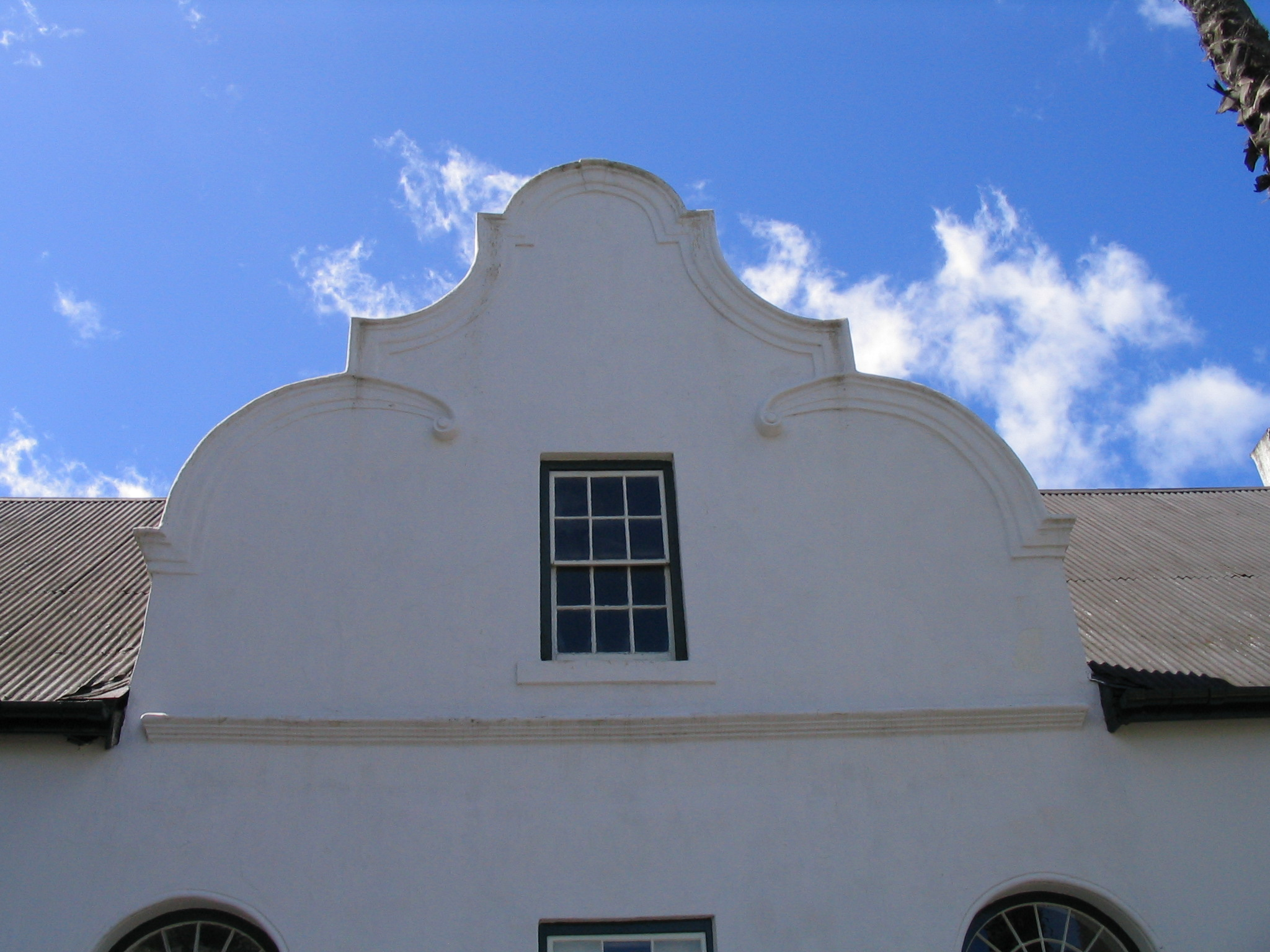
Cape Dutch gable on a house in Stellenbosch, South Africa

In architecture, a Dutch gable or Flemish gable is a gable whose sides have a shape made up of one or more curves and which has a pediment at the top. The gable may be an entirely decorative projection above a flat section of roof line, or may be the termination of a roof, like a normal gable (the picture of Montacute House, right, shows both types). The preceding is the strict definition, but the term is sometimes used more loosely, though the stepped gable should be distinguished from it. The term "Dutch gable" is also used in America and Australasia to refer to a gablet roof.

The Dutch gable was a notable feature of Renaissance architecture, which spread to northern Europe from the Low Countries, arriving in Britain during the latter part of the 16th century. Later Dutch gables with flowing curves became absorbed into Baroque architecture.

Examples of Dutch-gabled buildings can be found in historic cities across Europe. In Potsdam, Germany, 150 red brick houses featuring steep Dutch gables form part of the city's Dutch Quarter, while in Bruges, Belgium, a wide range of buildings featuring Dutch gables can be found. The Flemish culture also had a strong architectural impact in Arras, northern France. The style also spread beyond Europe, for example Barbados is well known for the Dutch gables on its historic buildings. Dutch settlers in South Africa also brought with them building styles from the Netherlands which included the use of prominent Dutch gables but adjusted to the Western Cape region where the style became known as Cape Dutch architecture.

The formation of Dutch gables requires careful detailing, to weatherproof the junction of the roof with the inner face of the Dutch gable wall with a flashing.

== History ==
Scroll gables first appeared in the prosperous towns of the former Southern Netherlands (in Flanders at large) and then quickly spread throughout the former Netherlands, and to all German-speaking parts of the Holy Empire as well as in Northern Europe to the Baltic countries, in particular via the network of merchant cities of the former Hanseatic League. The success of the Antwerp Mannerist architects is at the origin of the rapid diffusion of these gables from England to the Baltic in the second half of the 16th century.

The volutes are a motif derived from the influence of the Italian Renaissance, which was grafted onto the older architectural traditions of Northern Europe. This gable appeared by an evolution of the stepped gable, frequent in the architecture of the Middle Ages and the Renaissance of these regions. At the end of the Middle Ages, twisted and openwork Gothic foliage motifs (a motif derived from illuminations) as well as curved traceries which are specific to late Gothic, often decorated the Gothic bleachers in Northern Europe, although because of their fragility these decorations have rarely been preserved. The Italian volutes came initially to replace these old decorations during the first half of the 16th century, treated as simple ornaments added to the tiers or replacing them. Then, during the Mannerist and Baroque periods, large scrolls gradually tended to take up all the space, making the appearance of the tiers disappear. In the same way, obelisks, balls or statues took the place of the old Gothic ears.

== See also ==
- Clock gable
- Awning

== Sources ==
- Clarke, M. (2010). "gable". The Concise Oxford Dictionary of Art Terms. Oxford Paperback Reference. OUP Oxford. p. 106. ISBN 978-0-19-956992-2.
