= Stellenbosch Museum =

- Village Museum
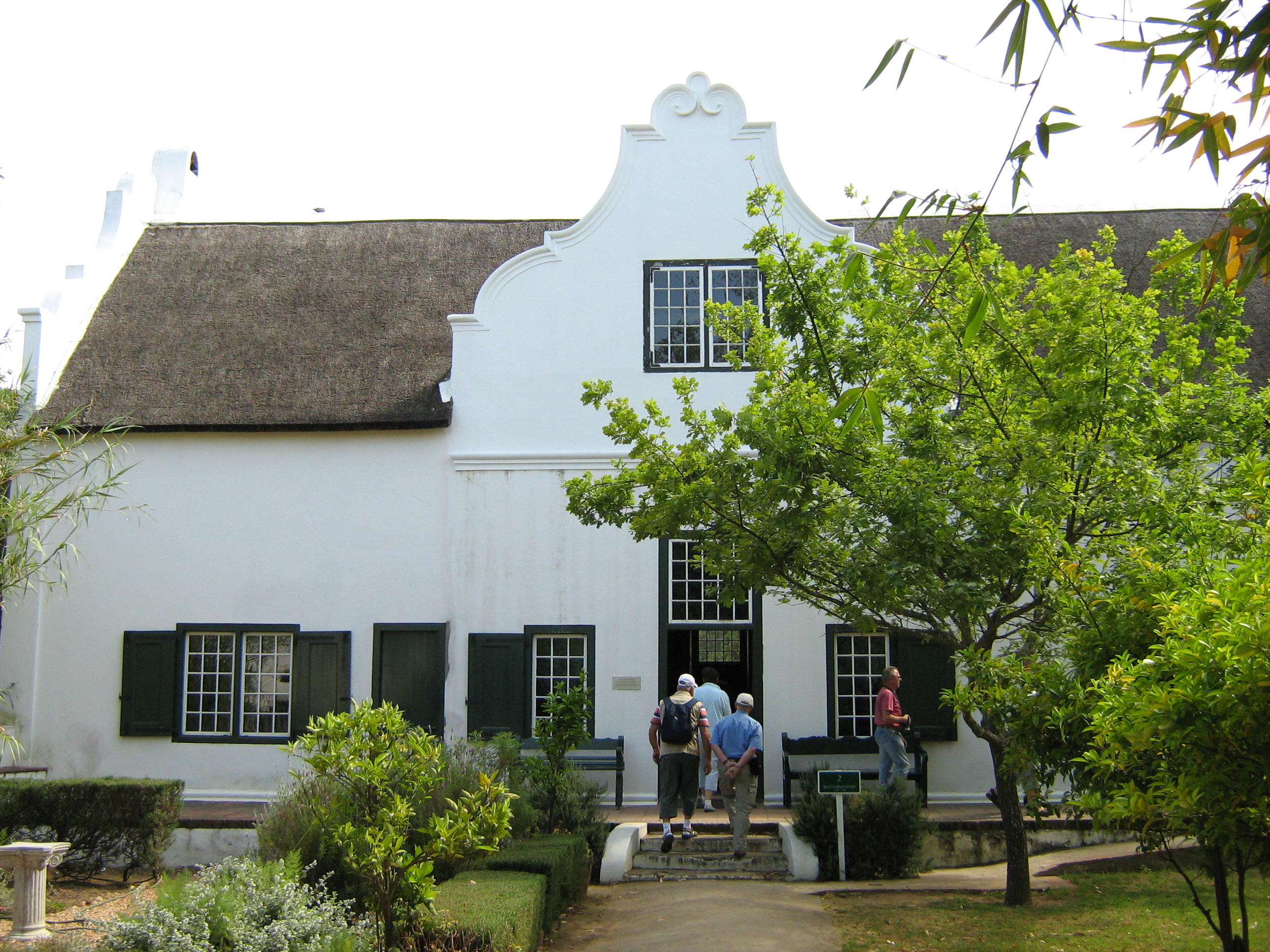
- The Bletterman House
- Established: 23 March 1962
- Location: 18 Ryneveld Street, Stellenbosch, South Africa
- Coordinates: 33.9374°S 18.8629°E
- Type: Cultural history museum
- Curator: Debbie Gabriels (Museum manager)
- Owner: Board of Trustees
- Parking: The Avenue, in front of Agricultural Hall
- Website: Official website

Stellenbosch Museum is a cultural history museum in the centre of Stellenbosch, South Africa. It was proclaimed a museum on 23 March 1962 and is a province-aided museum which receives support from the Government of the Western Cape. The museum includes four period houses, which depict the way people lived and the difference in architectural styles over the periods illustrated (the Village Museum). It also includes a historical powder magazine and a toy museum.

== Schreuder House ==
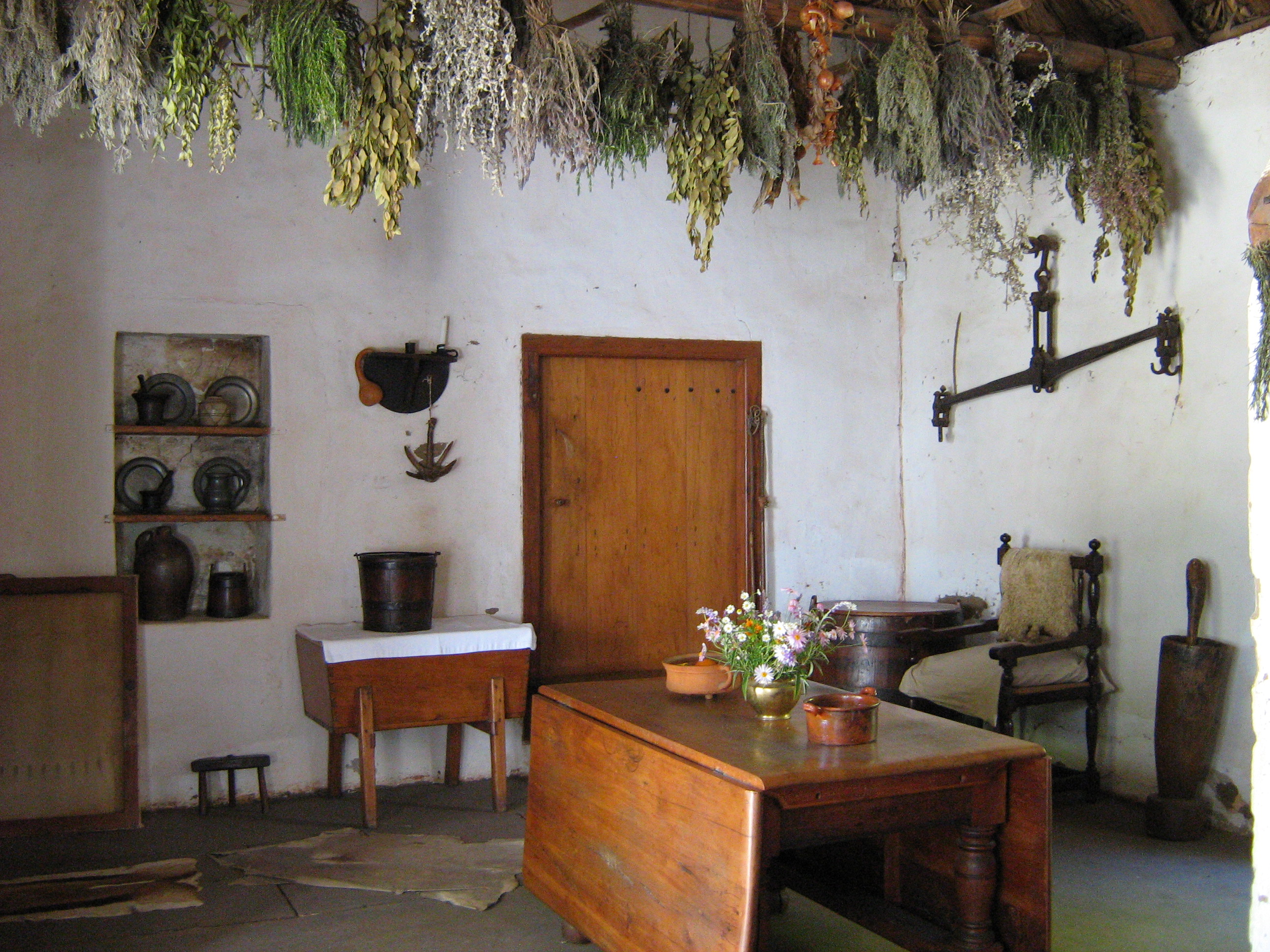
Schreuder House interior

The Schreuder House is the first period house in the museum complex, and is furnished according to the period c. 1709. The house was built in August 1707 by Sebastian Schreuder, who was a German messenger of the court of the Dutch East India Company. It is a pioneer cottage with a thatched roof and clay floor. Because window glass had to be imported from Holland, the windows are made of linen or gauze stretched over a frame with beeswax to seal the cloth against the elements. During a hard downpour, the housewife simply closed the outside shutters; in fine weather, the catches were released, the whole frame was lifted out, and fresh air was let in. The house was declared a monument in 1974 and is currently listed as a Grade II Western Cape provincial heritage site.

== Bletterman House ==
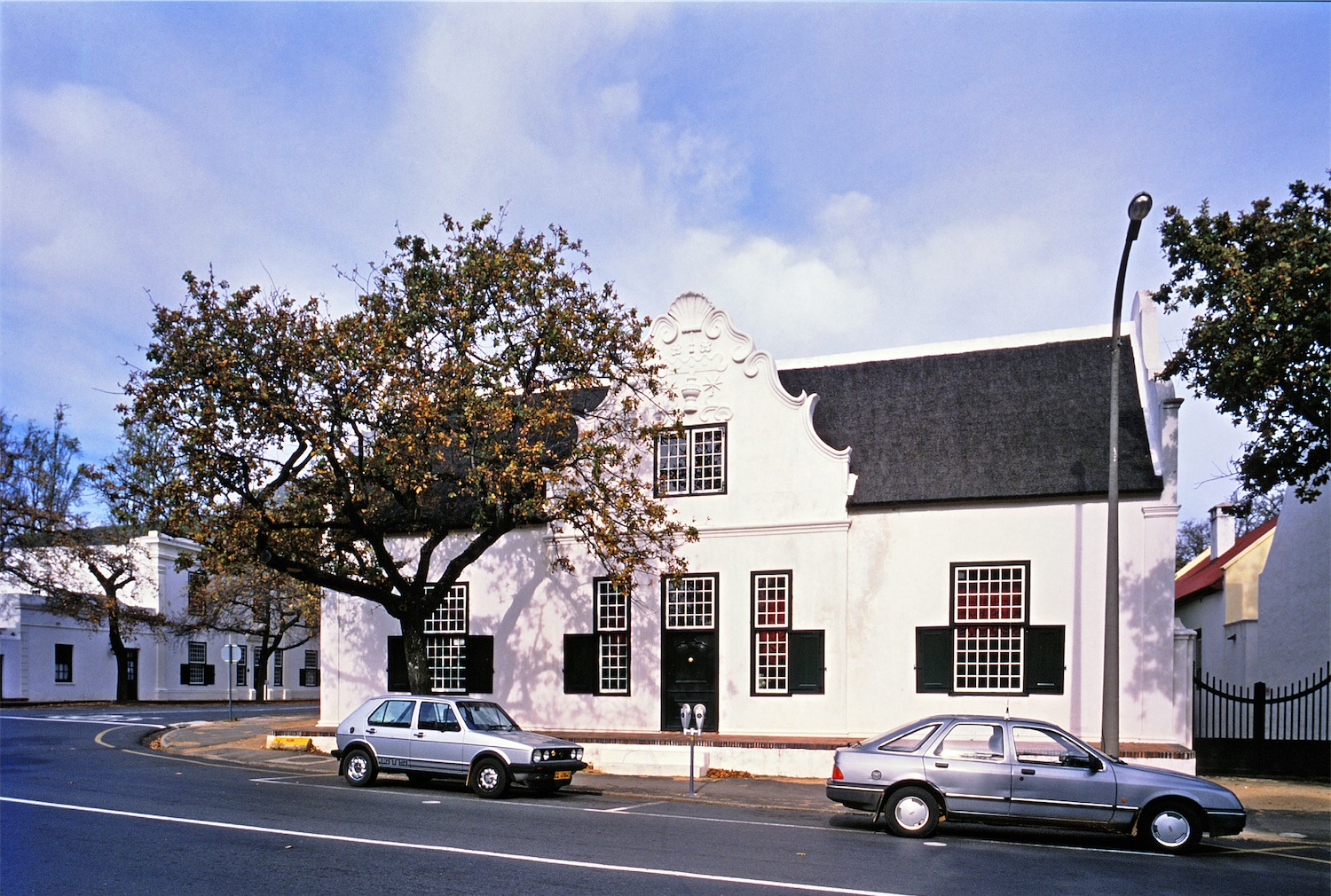
Bletterman House

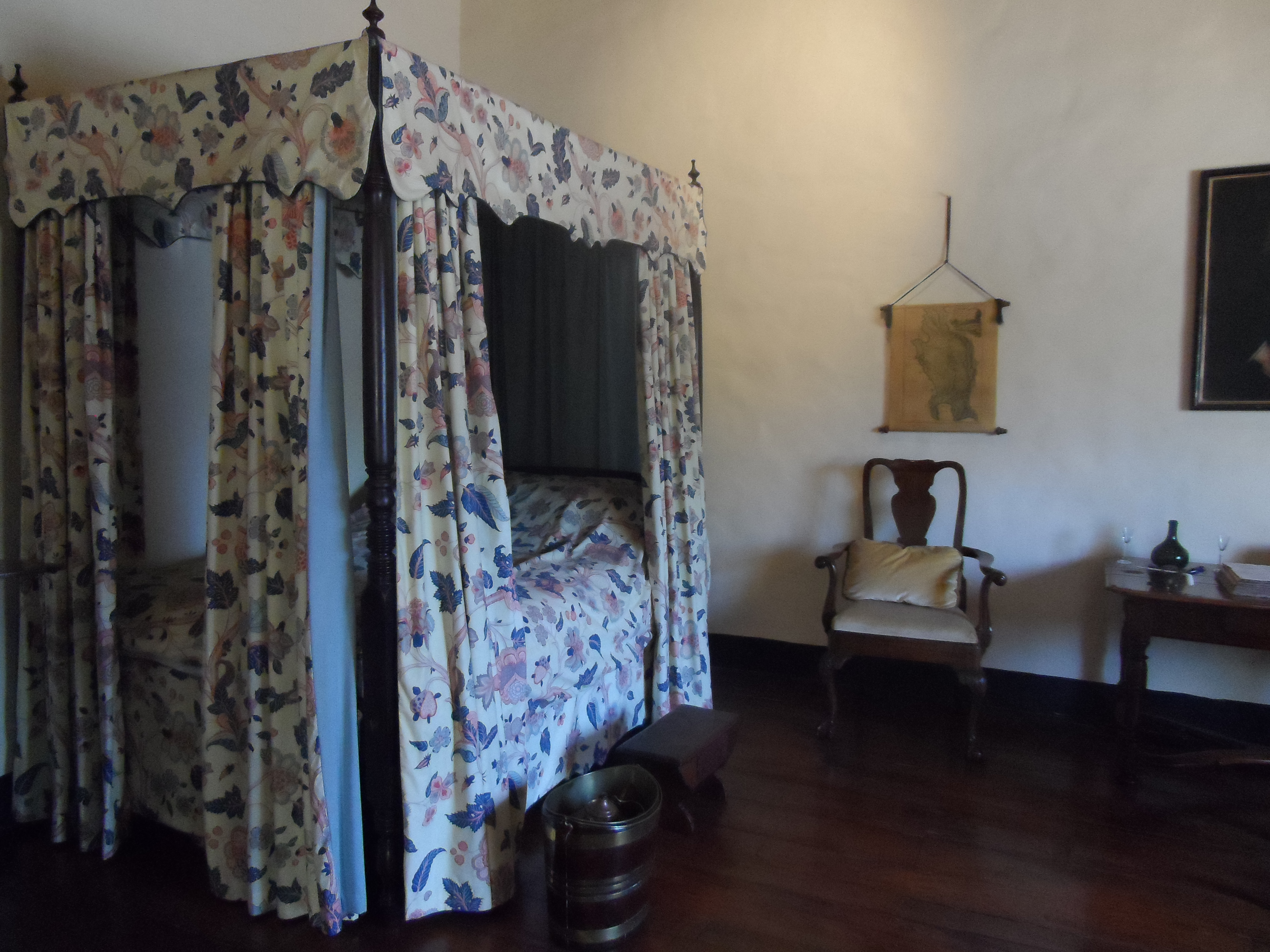
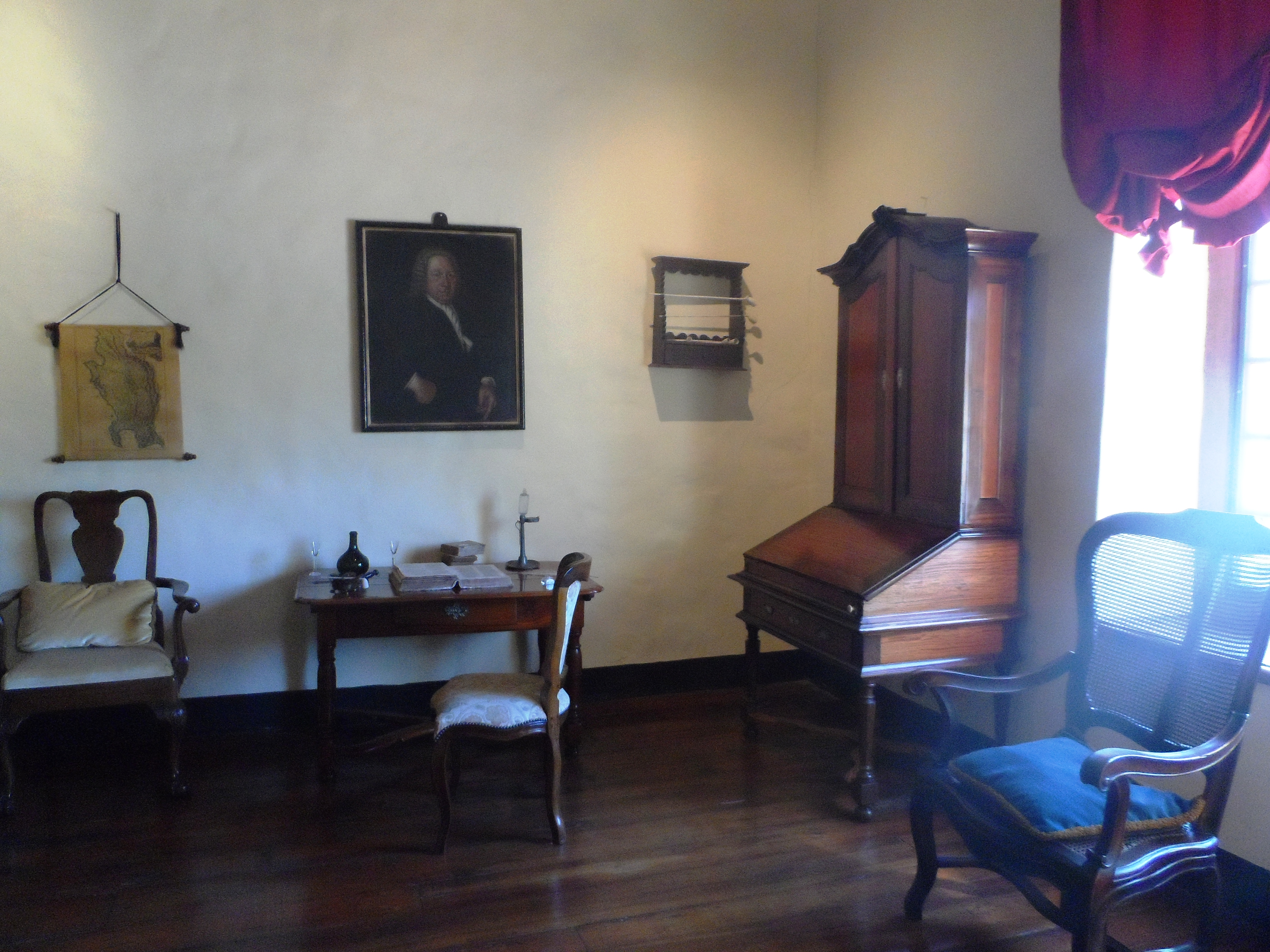

The Bleterman House in the museum complex depicts the period of c. 1789. The house was built by Hendrik Lodewyk Bletterman, Landdrost (Magistrate) of Stellenbosch from 1785 to 1795. This dwelling is a Cape Dutch H-shaped house and an example of a gabled house from the 18th century. The site on which Bletterman House is situated was purchased by Hendrik Lodewyk Bletterman in 1787. Since the Hertzog plan of 1817 shows a building on this site, it is assumed that Bletterman built the house sometime before that date. After his death in 1824, the house was sold to the Landdrost and Heemraden, and was converted into offices and a courtroom, becoming the "Stellenbosch Public Offices". The outbuilding was renovated and equipped with 50 school benches and served as a school for slaves. The school was officially opened in September 1825, with Erasmus Smit as teacher. There is no record that the main house was ever used as a residence after Bletterman's death. The Stellenbosch Police used the buildings as their headquarters from about 1879–1969, when it was acquired by the Stellenbosch Museum. The house is listed as a provincial heritage site.

== Grosvenor House ==
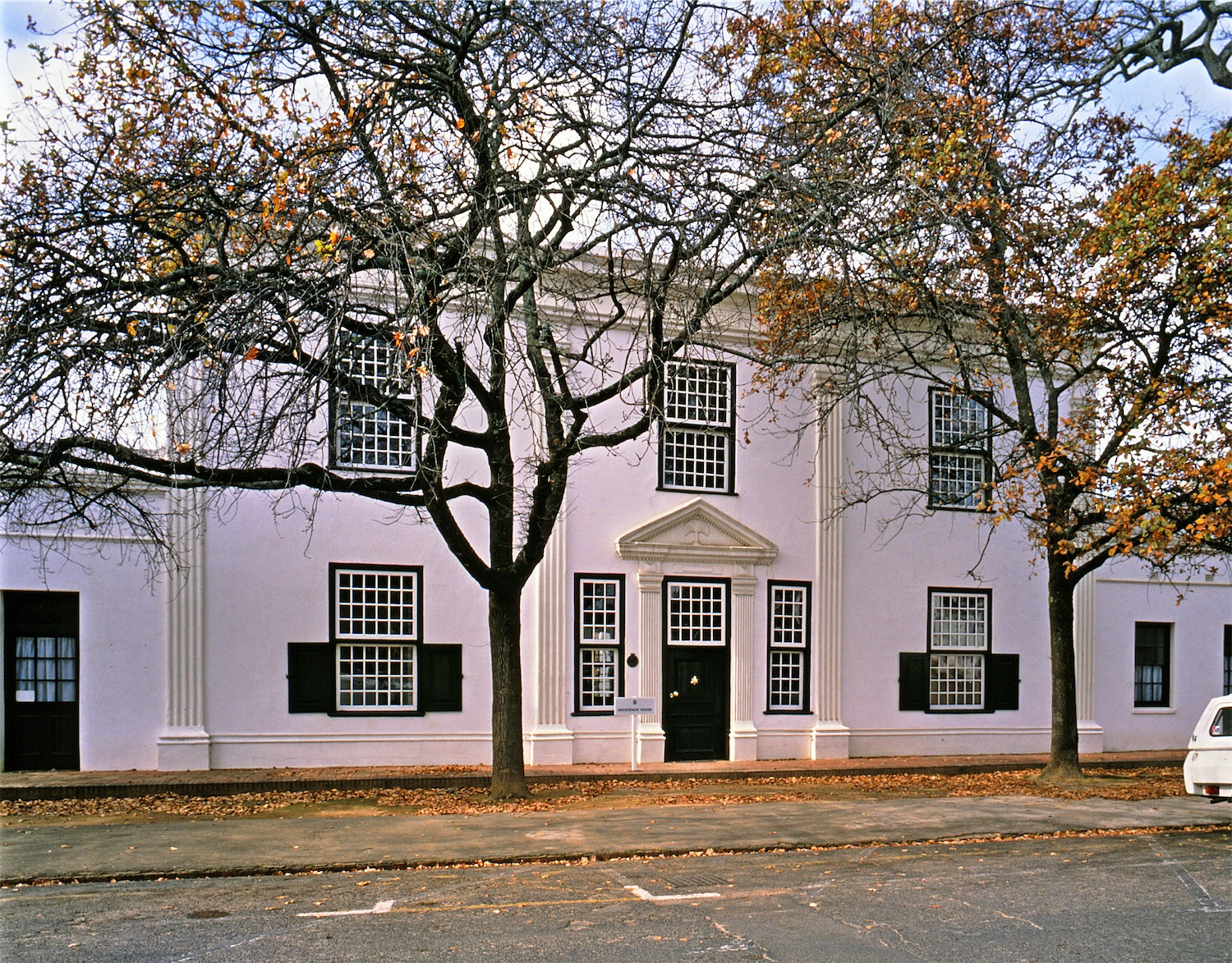
The Grosvenor House front

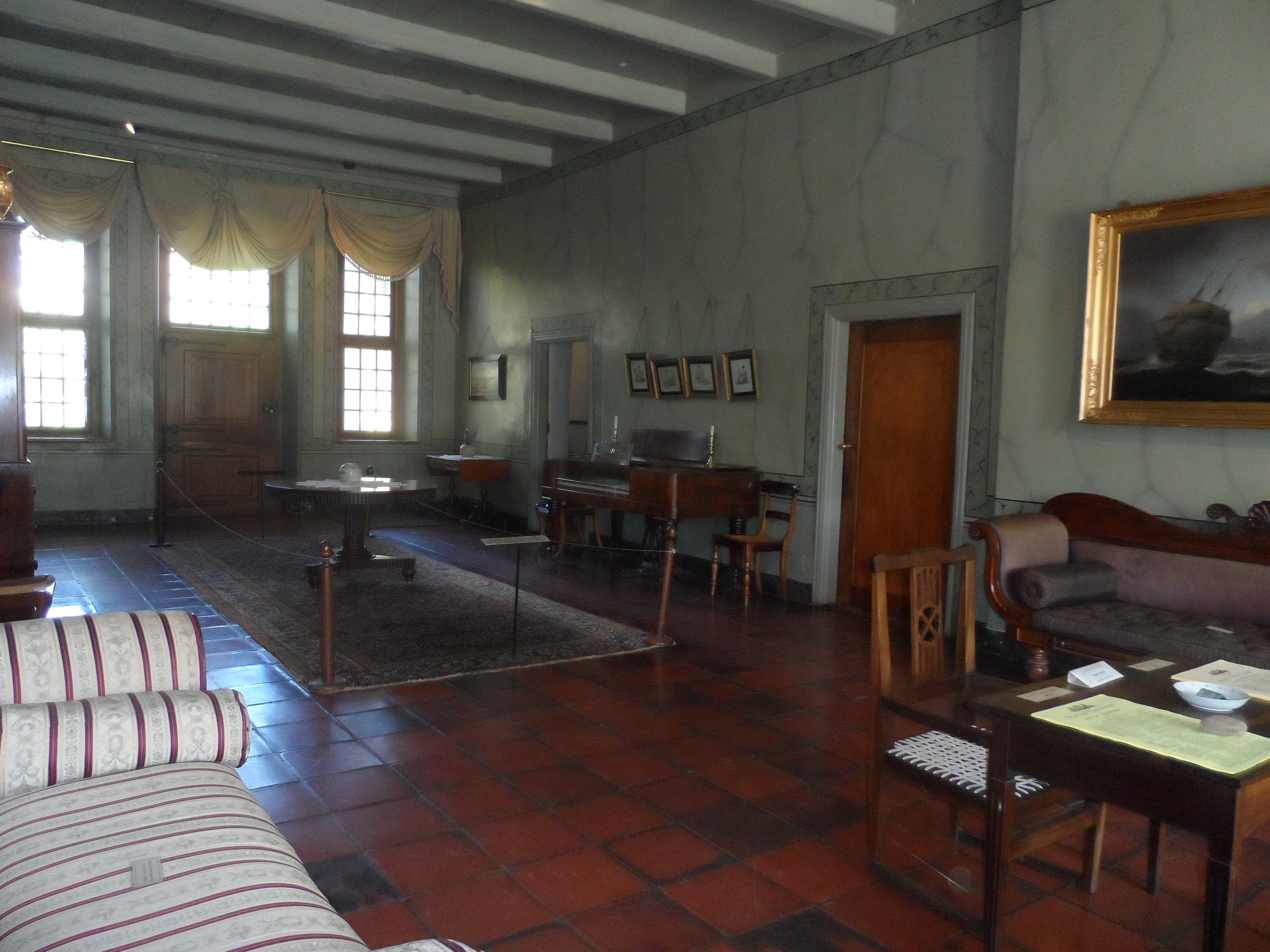
Grosvenor House Interior

The Grosvenor House is a mansion that depicts the period c. 1803, and is the ancestral home of the Neethling family. The site on which it stands was granted to Christiaan Ludolph Neethling in 1781, and a year later he had built a double-storey house on the property. Successive owners kept the house virtually unaltered. In 1872, Sir Christoffel J. Brand, first speaker of the Cape House of Assembly, became the new owner. After his death in 1876, William Collins of Bath, England, bought the property and it remained in the possession of his wife until 1941. The Collins family named the building Grosvenor House and converted it into a guest house.

Grosvenor House was the building in which the Stellenbosch Museum was located at the time of its proclamation. The building has been restored to illustrate the period c. 1800–c. 1830 when Willem Herold and his familyWillem Herold and his family. The house has been declared a provincial heritage site.

Individual items of furniture reflect the increasing influence of English taste on local furniture design after the second British occupation of the Cape in 1806 when Neoclassicism was in fashion. The interior doors have stinkwood frames and yellowwood panels. There are unusual shutters of the same wood and a heavy front door of solid teak. The facade of the house was designed in the classical style with fluted pilasters running up to support a wide cornice. The classicism is repeated in the treatment of the pedimented front door, which surrounds a plasterwork palm tree, the symbol on the Stellenbosch Church seal.

The plants in the garden of this house are those that would have been popular during the period.

== O.M. Bergh House ==
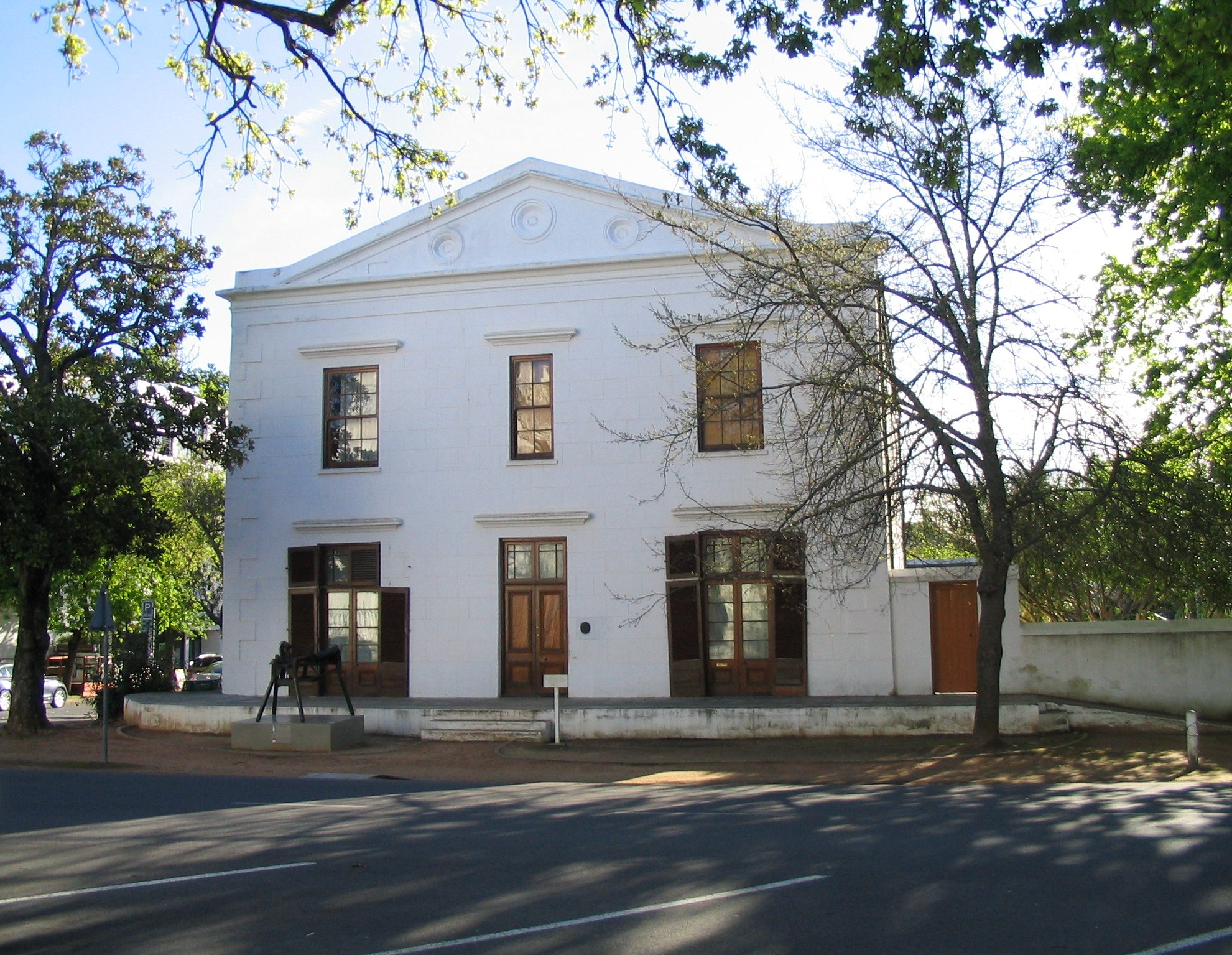
Bergh House

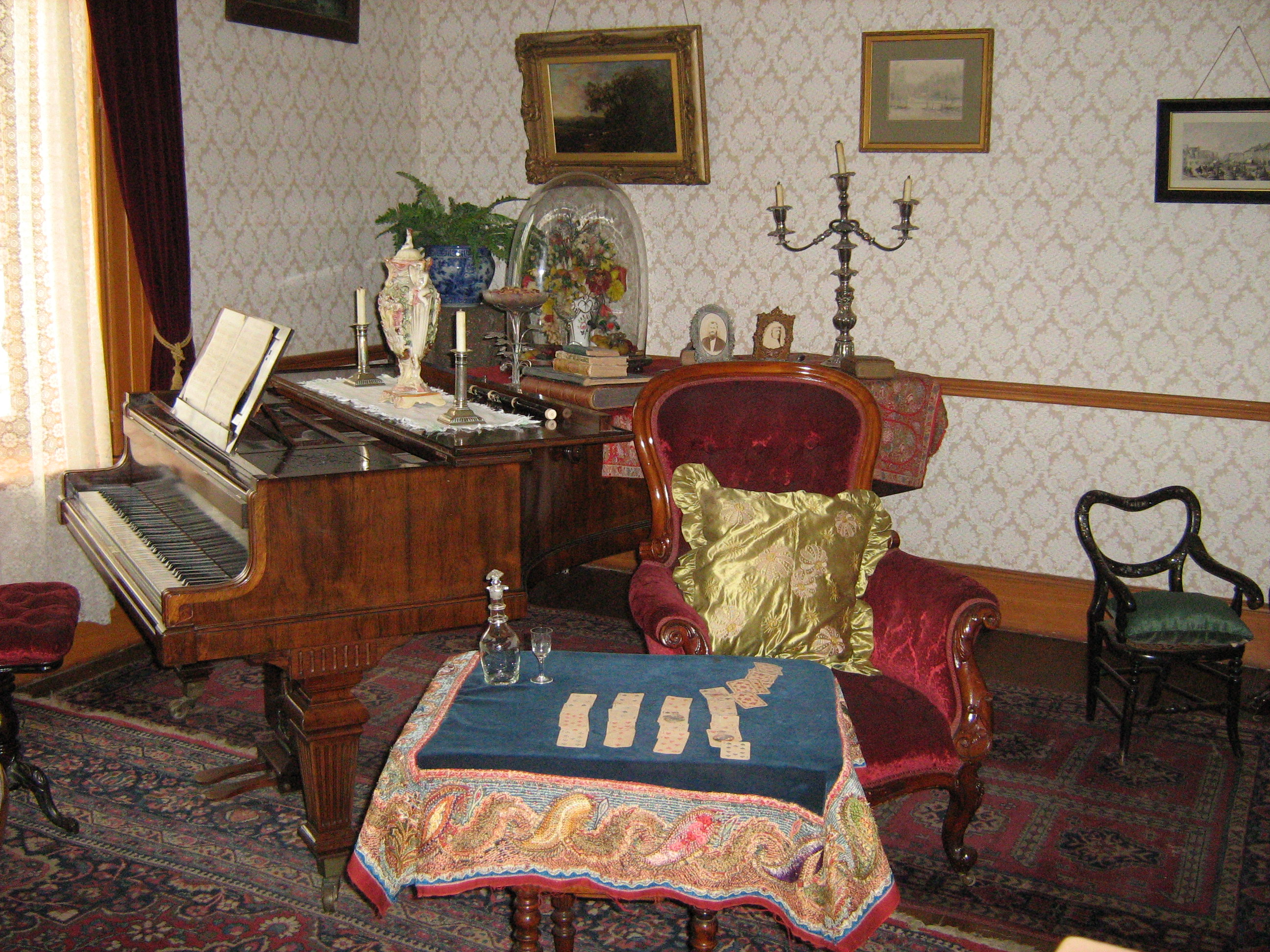
Bergh House interior

This Victorian house (now a provincial heritage site) was first owned by Christiaan Krynauw who is presumed to have erected a new T-shaped dwelling on the site. Olof Marthinus Bergh bought the property in 1836. He was born in Cape Town in 1792, and was Deputy-Sheriff of Stellenbosch.

An upper storey was added to the house during the second half of the 19th century. The house is furnished to reflect the interior of a typical middle-class Stellenbosch home during the period 1840 – 1880, more-or-less the time it was occupied by Bergh and his family. Heavy mahogany furniture in the prevailing English taste was very fashionable at the time and the Victorian penchant for clutter often made it difficult to move about in the drawing room. Wallpaper and family portraits are further indications of how sombre interior decoration was at the time – particularly after the Great Exhibition in 1851. The garden is laid out in the style of the period with roses and other shrubs that were popular during the mid-19th century.

== V.O.C. Kruithuis (powder magazine) ==
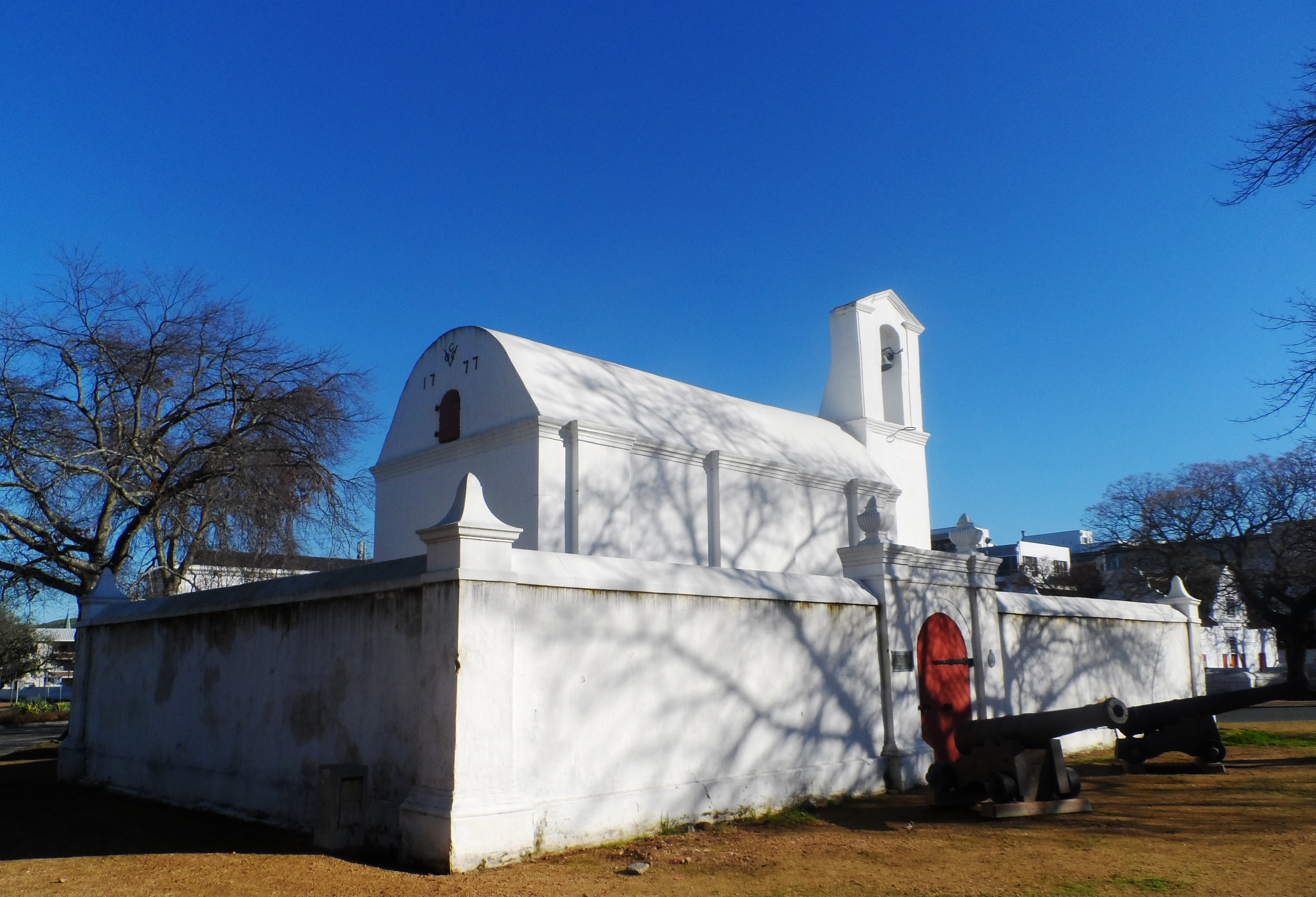
Powder Magazine

In the turbulent last quarter of the eighteenth century, the Governor and the Political Council at Cape Town came to the conclusion that it was desirable to store ammunition at Stellenbosch. Stellenbosch was also allowed cannon and guns, and the gunpowder and ammunition necessary to ward off an enemy attack, and a suitable building for storing this material had to be constructed. The consent of the governing council of the Dutch East India Company (V.O.C.) in the Netherlands was duly applied for and received, and authority was given to build the arsenal or magazine. On 7 October 1776, the Landdrost called for tenders for erection of the building. That of Philip Hartog and Lambert Fick for 9000 guilders was accepted and on 5 May 1777, the building was completed.

Stellenbosch has always been a peaceful town and not once during its 300 years of existence have guns been fired as an act of war. The V.O.C. Kruithuis therefore soon lost its strategic military value and in less than seventy years became the site of the local Friday market. After serving as a market house for almost a century, it was restored by the Stellenbosch Municipality in 1936. The building was proclaimed a National Monument (now a provincial heritage site) on 10 May 1940, and in 1943, was opened to the public as a small Africana Museum.The museum did not exist for very long, and there were many years during which the building remained locked and inaccessible to the public. In 1971, the municipality agreed to allow the Stellenbosch Museum to take over the building for display of its collection of fire-arms, cannon, military uniforms, and other objects.

The V.O.C. Kruithuis is unique in South Africa as it is the only remaining powder magazine in the country dating from the days of the Dutch East India Company, and it is a symbol of the town's rich and varied architectural heritage.

== Publications ==
The Stellenbosch Museum has published the following books:

- Fransen, Hans (1970). Cape chair: the illustrated edition of the catalogue of an exhibition held in the Stellenbosch Museum in April 1969. Stellenbosch Museum.
- Cook, Mary Alexander (1973). The Cape Kitchen. Stellenbosch Museum.
- Berkowitz, Barry (1976). The Cape Gunsmith. Stellenbosch Museum.
- Le Roux, Marius (1982). The Cape Copper Smith. Stellenbosch Museum.
- Obholzer, A.M.; Baraitser, M.; Malherbe, W. D. (1985). The Cape House and its Interior. Stellenbosch Museum.
- Walton, James (1985). Cape Dovecots and Fowl-Runs. Stellenbosch Museum.
- Malherbe, Fana; Malherbe, Wilma (1999). H.A.J.B. Hammerschmidt: Medical Practitioner in Stellenbosch 1858-1860. Stellenbosch Museum.

== See also ==
- List of heritage sites in Stellenbosch

== Literature ==
- Coetzee, Cora (1976). Eikestad: 'n Versameling gekleurde pentekeninge van Stellenbosch [A collection of pen and wash drawings of Stellenbosch]. Cape Town: Struik.
- Bouman, A. C.; Franken, J. L. M.; Plessis, J. du (1929). Stellenbosch 1679-1929. Dorpsraad van Stellenbosch / Hortors Beperk.
