= Mary Alexander Cook =

- Born: Mary Alexander Cook; 4 August 1902; Barnsley, Yorkshire, England
- Died: 2 August 1981 (aged 78)
- Education: Leeds University

Dr Mary Alexander Cook (4 August 1902 – 2 August 1981) was an expert on Cape Dutch architecture and a museum curator.

== Life and work ==
Dr Mary Cook was born in Barnsley, Yorkshire, England, on 4 August 1902. She studied medicine at Leeds University, graduating in 1925. She married an Anglican minister, Alexander Cook, and in 1926, they moved to South Africa and settled in the then Transvaal. Dr Cook worked as a general practitioner until her first son was born in 1931. Later she lectured on public health to nursing students in Pretoria.

Dr Cook's fascination with Cape architecture and decorative arts started during family holidays to the Western Cape. She studied the topic and did research in the archives. Becoming known as an authority on the subject she started campaigning for the preservation of Cape architecture, and in 1947, she wrote regularly on the subject in journals and newspapers.

The family moved to Cape Town, and her husband died in 1957. In 1958, she took up the position of cultural historian at the South African Museum, putting her in charge of their cultural history collections. These were primarily located at Koopmans-de Wet House, Strand Street, Cape Town. In 1965 she was appointed the curator at the Drostdy Museum in Swellendam. She held this position until her retirement in 1974. Dr Cook was awarded an Honorary Doctorate from Stellenbosch University in 1971.

She retired to her house, Ballotina in Church Street, Tulbagh, which she had bought in 1945, and died on 2 August 1981.

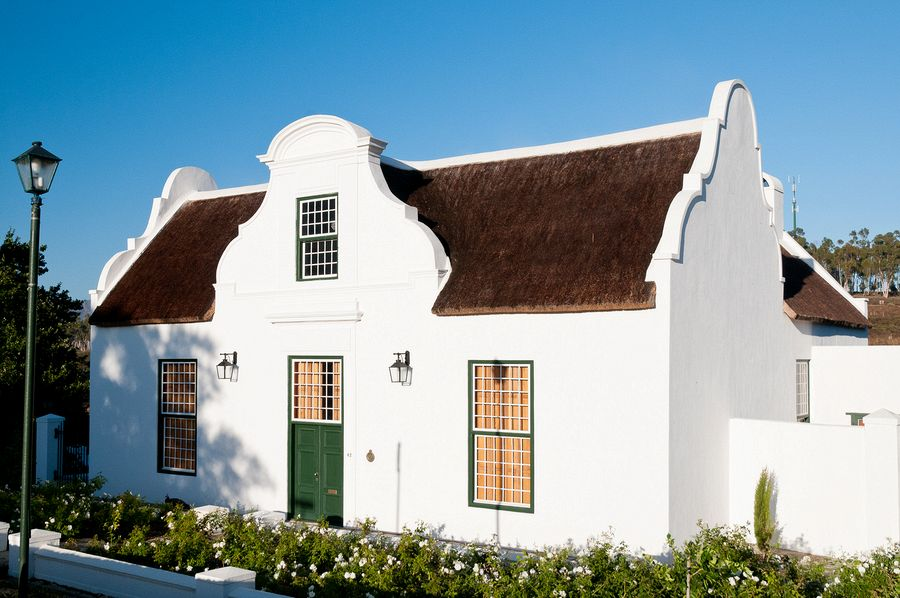
Ballotina, Church St, Tulbagh

== Awards ==
- Historical Monuments Commission medal (1949)
- The Cape Tercentenary Foundation Award (1959)
- The South African Academy of Arts and Science Award (1969)

== Publications ==
- The official Guide to Koopmans de Wet House.
- Numerous brochures and articles.
- The Old Houses of the Cape, with H. Fransen, 1965.
- The Cape Kitchen, 1973

== See also ==
- Koopmans-de Wet House
- A Guide to the Old Buildings of the Cape
