= Gable =

Architectural feature

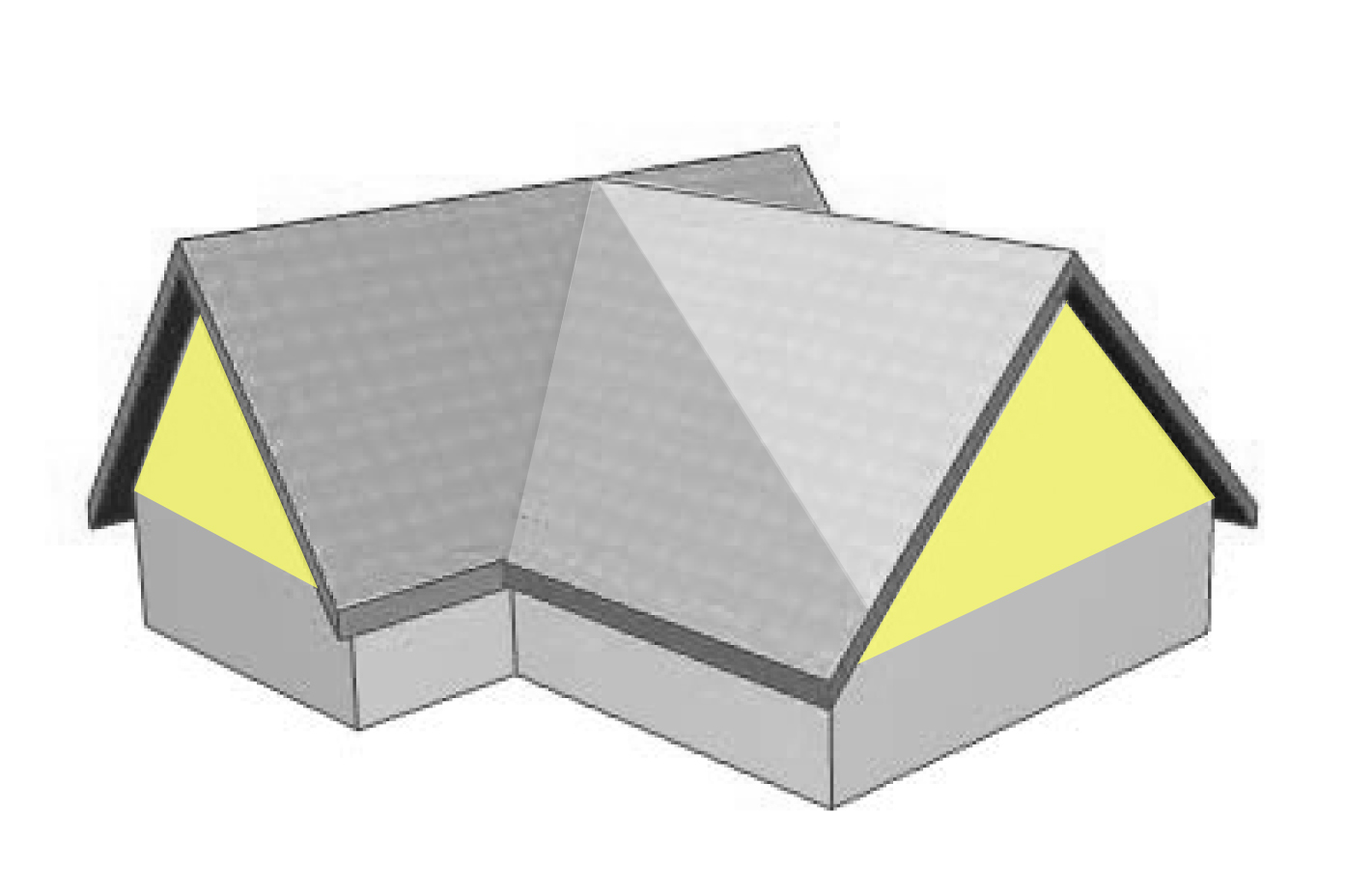
A single-story house with three gables, although only two can be seen (highlighted in yellow). This arrangement is a crossed gable roof.

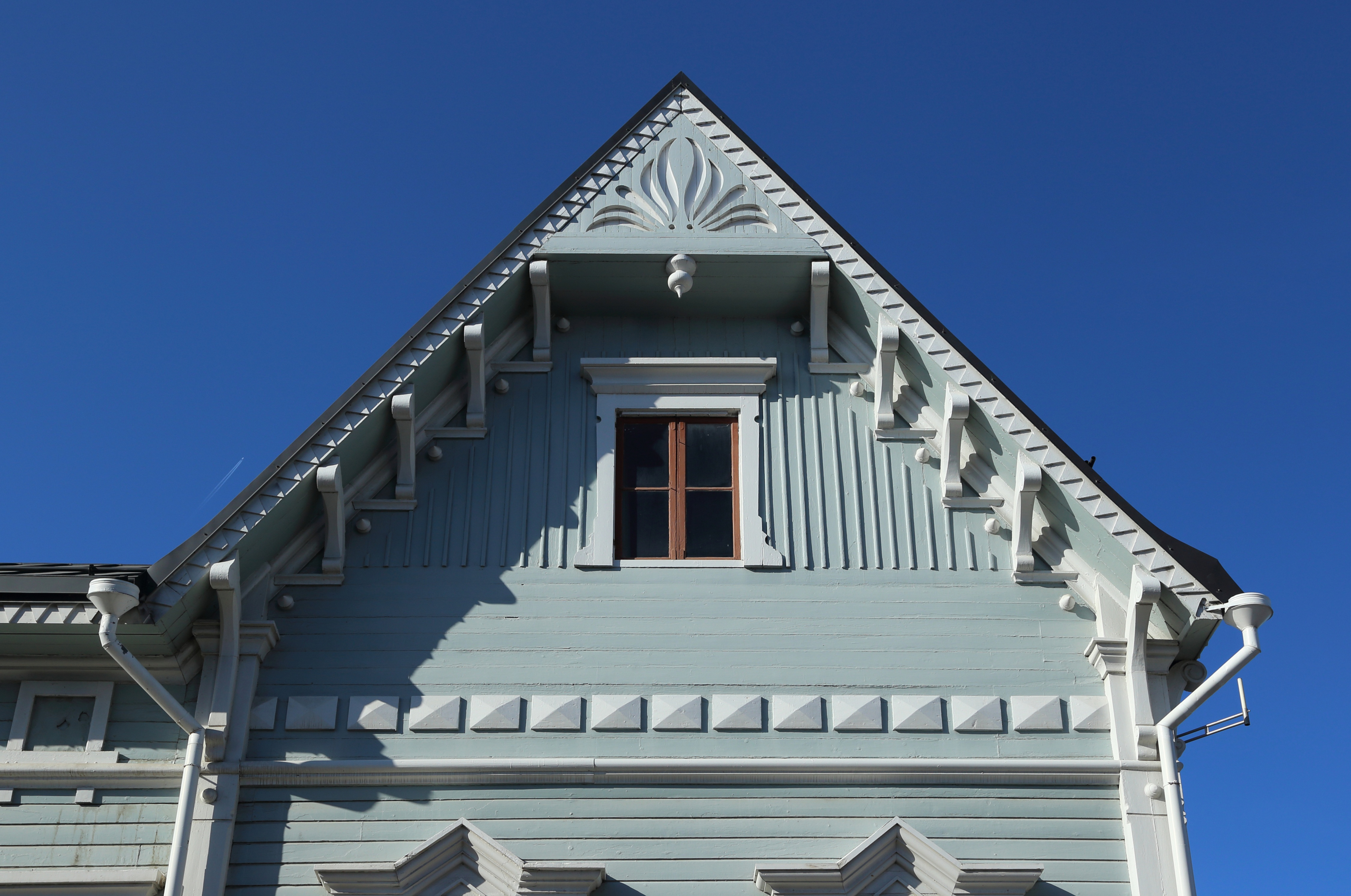
A gable of a house in Oulu, Finland

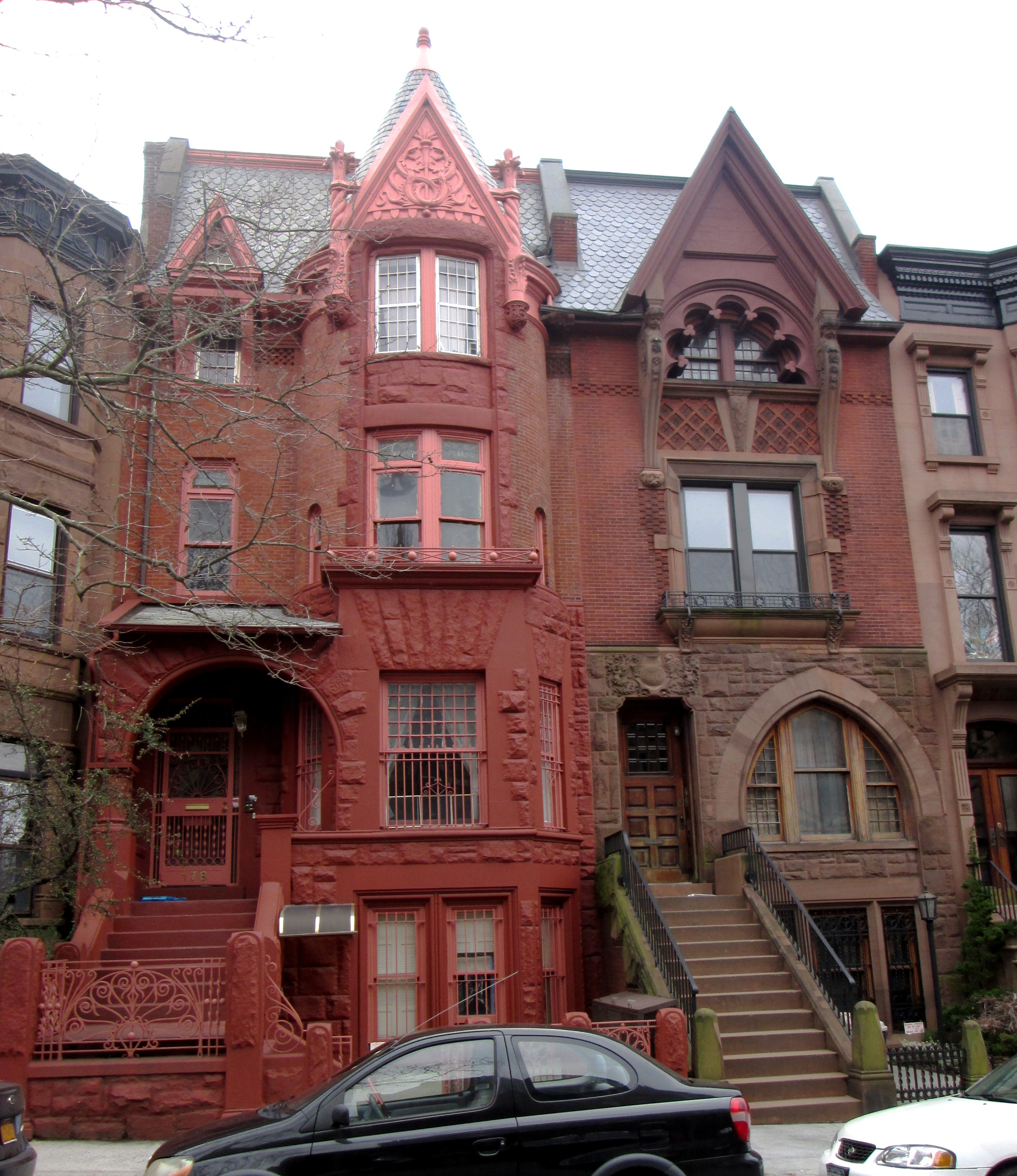
Decorative gable roof at 176–178 St. John's Place, between Sixth and Seventh Avenue in the Park Slope neighborhood of Brooklyn, New York City

A gable is the generally triangular portion of a wall between the edges of intersecting roof pitches. The shape of the gable and how it is detailed depends on the structural system used, which reflects climate, material availability, and aesthetic concerns. The term gable wall or gable end more commonly refers to the entire wall, including the gable and the wall below it. Some types of roof do not have a gable (for example hip roofs do not). One common type of roof with gables, the 'gable roof', is named after its prominent gables.

A parapet made of a series of curves (shaped gable, see also Dutch gable) or horizontal steps (crow-stepped gable) may hide the diagonal lines of the roof.

Gable ends of more recent buildings are often treated in the same way as the Classic pediment form. But unlike Classical structures, which operate through trabeation, the gable ends of many buildings are actually bearing-wall structures.

Gable style is also used in the design of fabric structures, with varying degree sloped roofs, dependent on how much snowfall is expected.

Sharp gable roofs are a characteristic of the Gothic and classical Greek styles of architecture.

The opposite or inverted form of a gable roof is a V-roof or butterfly roof.

== Front-gabled and side-gabled ==
While a front-gabled or gable-fronted building faces the street with its gable, a side-gabled building faces it with its cullis (gutter), meaning the ridge is parallel to the street. The terms are used in architecture and city planning to determine a building in its urban situation.

Front-gabled buildings are considered typical for German city streets in the Gothic period, while later Renaissance buildings, influenced by Italian architecture, are often side-gabled. In America, front-gabled houses, such as the gablefront house, were popular between the early 19th century and 1920.

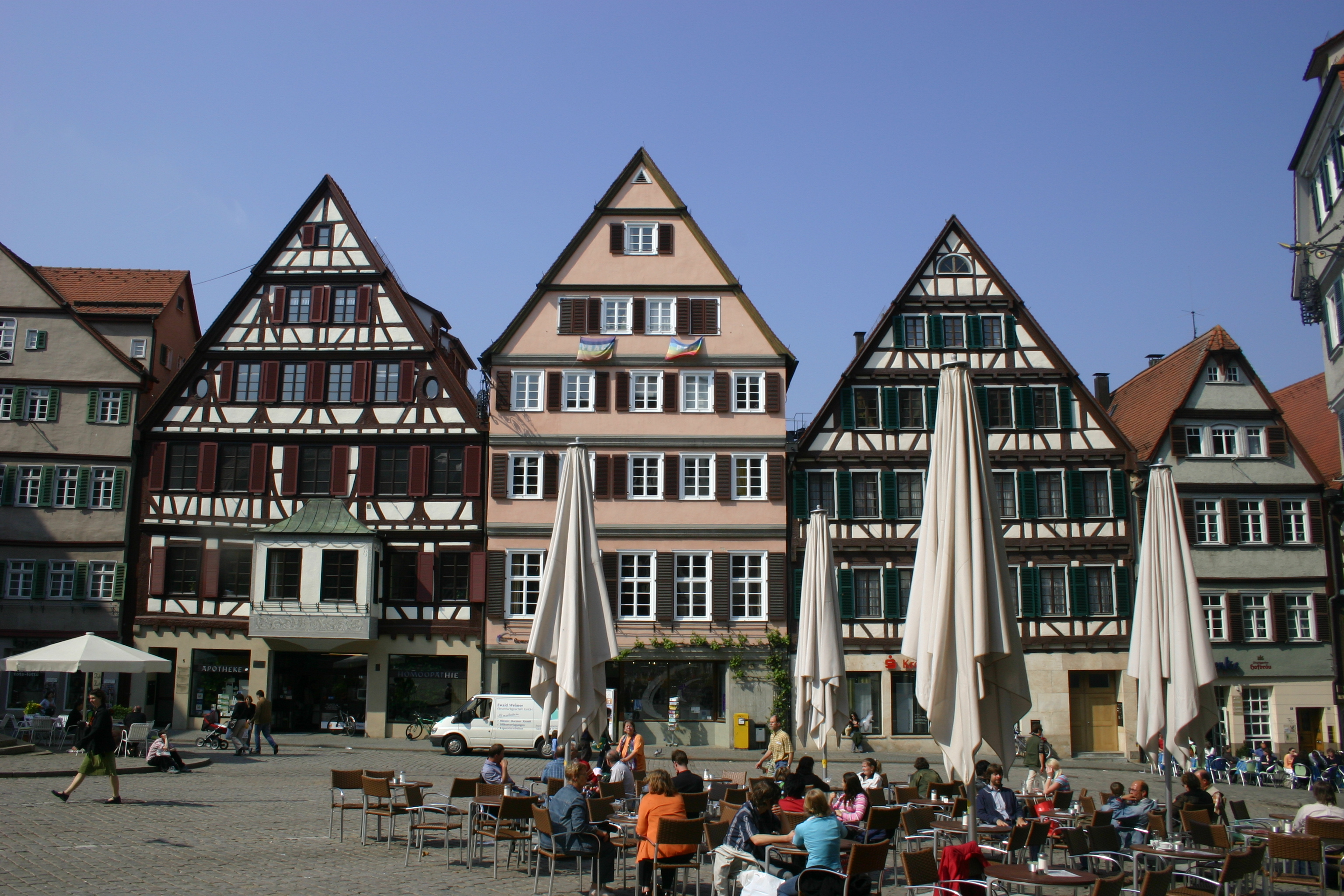
Front-gabled buildings in Tübingen in Baden-Württemberg in Germany

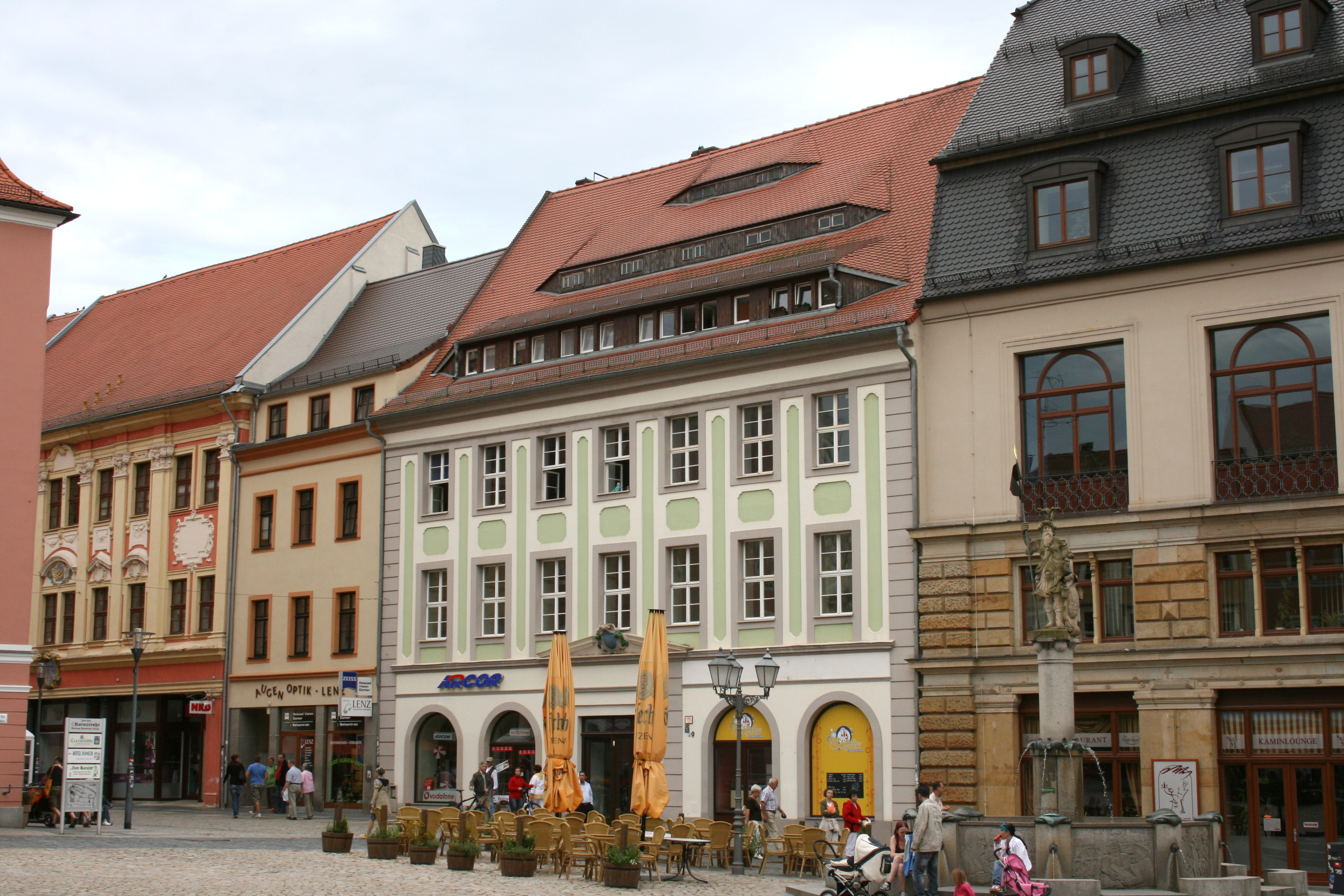
Side-gabled buildings in Bautzen in Saxony, Germany

== Wimperg ==
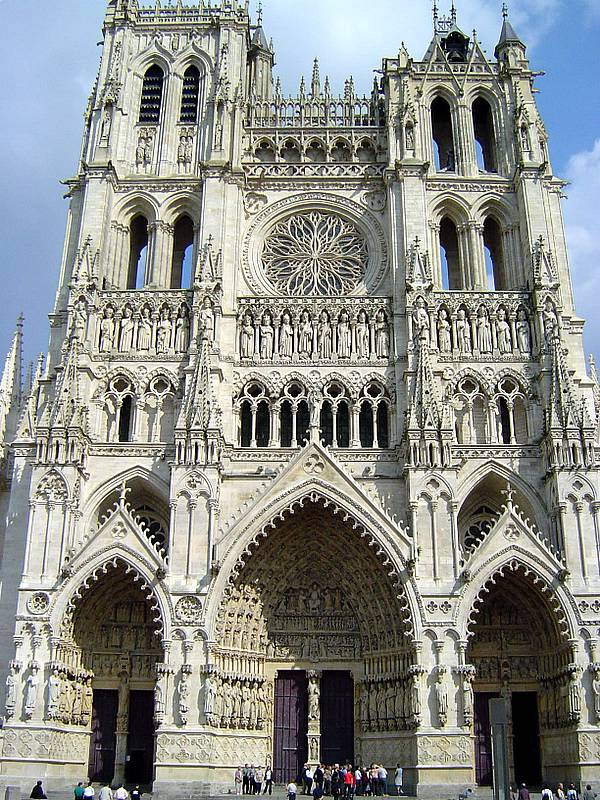
Amiens Cathedral in northern France, showing three portals with wimperg and pinnacles and a rose window

A Wimperg, in German and Dutch, is a Gothic ornamental gable with tracery over windows or portals, which were often accompanied by pinnacles. It was a typical element in Gothic architecture, especially in cathedral architecture. Wimpergs often had crockets or other decorative elements in the Gothic style. The intention behind the wimperg was the perception of increased height.

== Drawbacks ==
The gable-end roof is a poor design for hurricane- or tornado-prone regions. Winds blowing against the gable end can exert tremendous pressure, both on the gable and on the roof edges where they overhang it, causing the roof to peel off and the gable to cave in. An NWS warning for hurricane Katrina mentioned the vulnerability of gable roofs.

== See also ==
- Bell-gable (espadaña)
- Clock gable
- Cape Dutch architecture
- Eaves
- Façade
- Gablet roof
- Hip roof
- List of roof shapes
- Tympanum (architecture)
