= Architecture of Barbados =

Nicholas Abbey's Great House
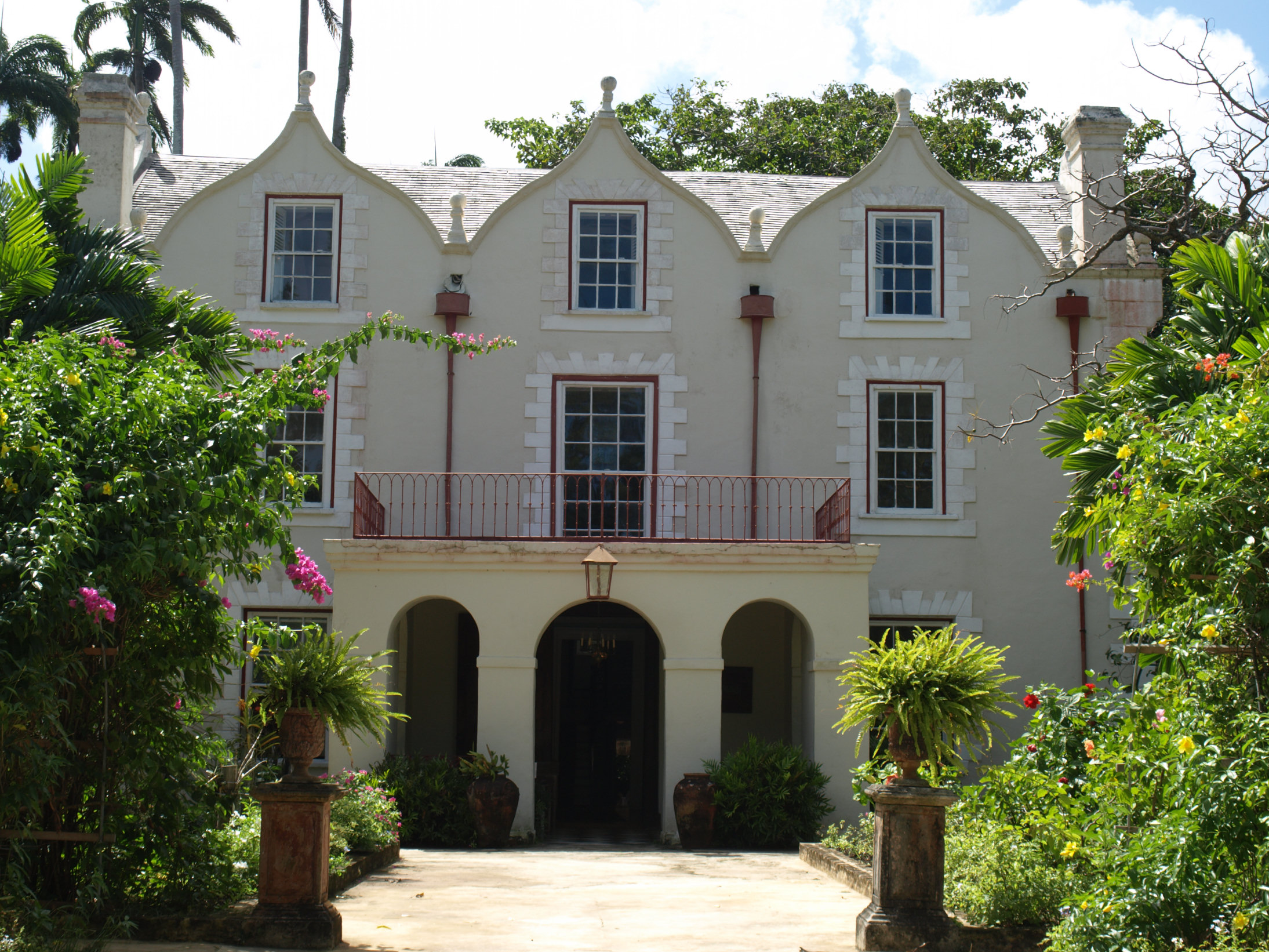

General information
- Architectural style: Jacobean
- Location: Saint Peter, Barbados
- Construction started: 1658

Design and construction
- Architect: Benjamin Berringer

Website
- http://www.stnicholasabbey.com/The-Plantation/The-Great-House/

The architecture of Barbados is a reflection of the country's cultural and political history. Originating from the seventeenth-century, the buildings located in Barbados can be seen as being heavily influenced by British colonial and West African architecture.

During the official British colonisation of Barbados in 1627, the architecture on the island became dominated by British and West African influences. The British Settlers brought West African slaves onto the island for the purpose of cultivating the land for industry in order to achieve economical and financial gain for Britain. The emergence of sugar plantations during this time, marked the beginning of European and West African architectural influence on Barbados. Characteristic of this time period, are the large structures constructed for the use of plantations houses by the British. These houses were constructed using methods and layouts consistent with the Georgian and Jacobean architecture of English heritage. The financial state of Barbados during certain periods, permitted the creation of these architectural buildings.

Whilst the structures aesthetically look the same as the English structures, adaptations had to be made according to the environmental circumstances limited by Barbados' Caribbean isolation. The materials that were utilised for in constructing the architecture on the island, were used so that they could withstand the impact of the weather. Heavy rains and rapid winds are habitual to Barbados, due to the islands exposed geographical location to The North Atlantic Ocean. In this way, Architecture had to adapt to the elements so that they may not deteriorate over time. The coral that surrounds Barbados, was also used in the architecture of the plantation houses specifically because it was readily available and when made into stone, could be used as an integral support framework for the large colonial structures that were being developed.

== House Structures/Architectural Style ==
=== Plantation Houses ===
In Barbados, the European planters built their own housing structures out of materials they could source readily and that were more durable, using architectural methods they already obtained. Georgian Architecture is the most prominent architectural style that was used in building the houses for Barbadian Plantations of the Sugar Industry, whilst other styles including Jacobean style architecture is also a contributors to Barbados's architectural heritage. The Georgian influence can be seen through the grand scale of the plantain houses, as well as the style heavily dictated by symmetry. The plantation houses were often constructed using the coral that lined the shore of Barbados. The coral blocks were plastered over in order to preserve the structural integrity of the foundations. The construction of these architectural buildings was primarily achieved through the labour of the Barbadians.

During the time of the British rule in Barbados, the emergence of a new architectural form was established. This occurred after 1765 when the architecture of the British colonial became fused with the methods and designs of West African buildings. Through these adaptations, the 'Caribbean Georgian' style was established as a prominent form of architecture that was constructed with the combinations of influences of Georgian style design with environmental Caribbean practicality. This included the addition of verandahs and awnings that reflected the humidity from the sun and the earth off the houses in Barbados.

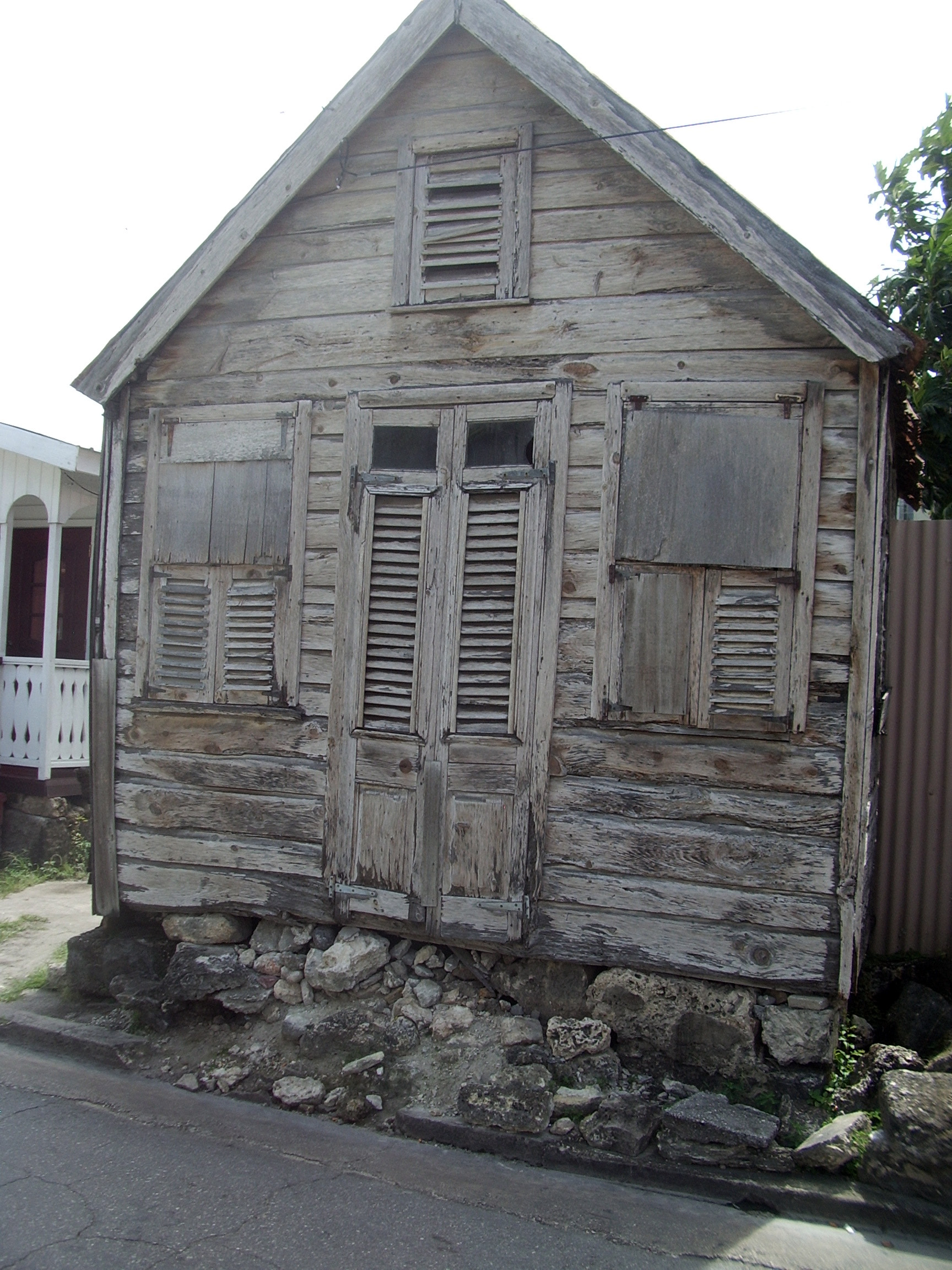
Chattel House, Barbados

=== Chattel Houses ===
The Chattel House is an architectural housing design characteristic to the Barbados region. It is a small wooden-built structure that is rectangular in floorpan and usually consists of two rooms inside. The house is built upon loose coral block structures that enable it to be moved and transported to different locations, rather than the structure being permanently grounded in the earth. The moveable structure allowed seventeenth-century sugar plantation workers to disassemble and transport the building structure from one plantation to another. This relocation occurred often after trade agreements between the European planters lending of land and Barbadian worker's labour fell through.

The architectural design and planning of the Chattel House was predominantly curated through the consideration of the natural environment of Barbados. The roof and windows of the Chattel House are critical in protecting the structural integrity of the building and preventing damage from external forces. The angle of the Chattel house roof is steep so that it can effectively deflect the rain and wind, rather than provide a platform for the wind to destabilise the moveable construction. The windows of the Chattel House are built using extra reinforcements on the shutters so that they can also withstand the harsh wind and rain from causing damage to the external and internal structures of the house. House configuration was decided according to the positioning of the wind so that it may cause least damage to the building.

Whilst the Barbadian Chattel House remained a crucial architectural structure for Barbadian workers, modifications were made after 1650 that were a direct influence of the British colonial structures built during the time. Extensions easily fitted within the preexisting rectangular structure of the Chattel, and terraces were also added to the front so as to mimic the Plantation style buildings influenced by Georgian architecture. The bright colours characteristic of the Chattel House remained in reference to similar design qualities of West African architecture

=== Garrison ===
Bridgetown in Barbados is a historic port town that served as a military trade post to the New World for the British Colonial empire. Over time, its construction has been extended to include the significant St Ann's Garrison (Saint Ann's Fort), which was built as a fort to retain slavery for the British Empire in the Americas. Originally, the fort was constructed from wood but was later rebuilt with stone to expand and strengthen its structure so that it could meet the demand of its purpose as a military defence of Barbados
