= Clock gable =

Feature in traditional Dutch architecture

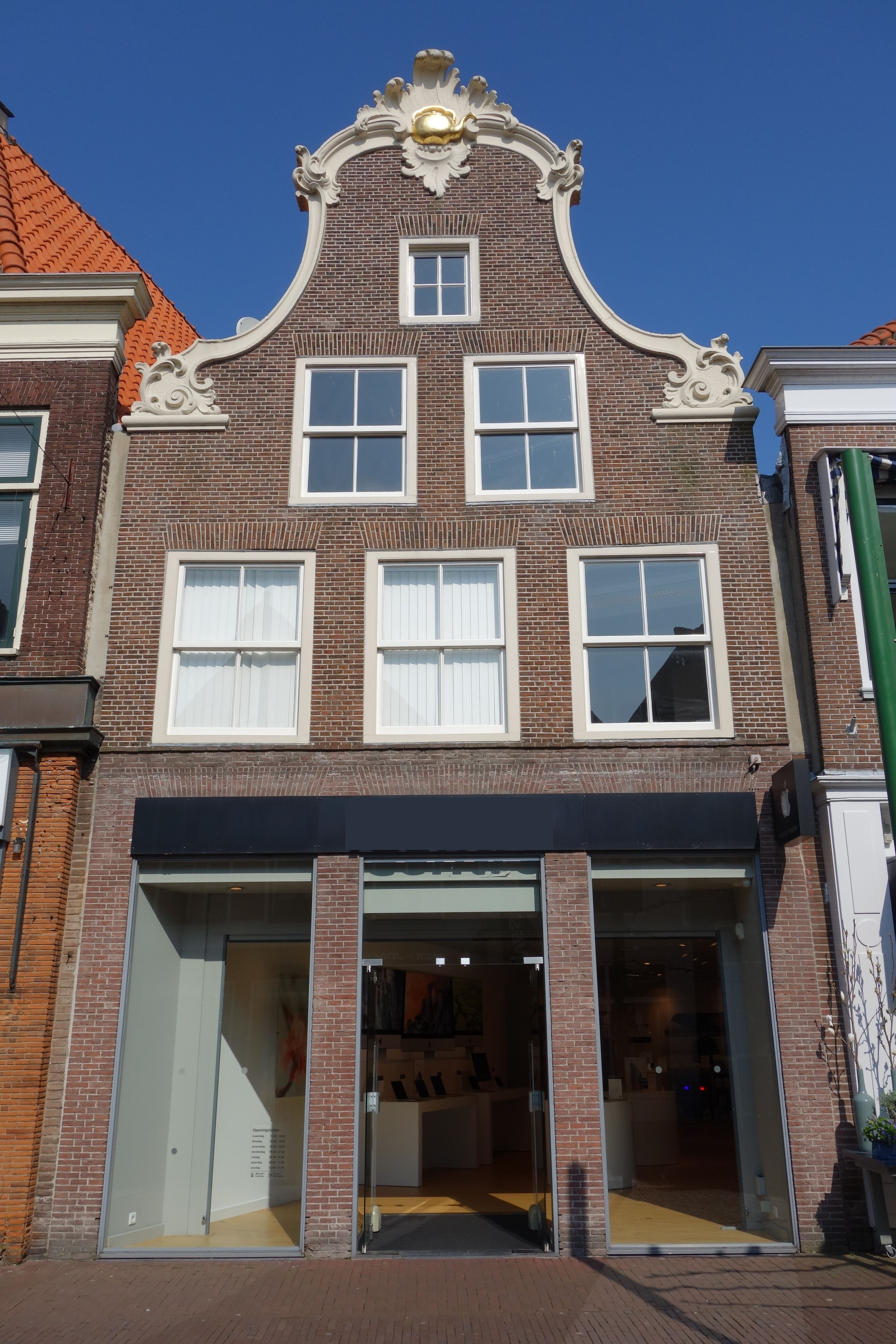
Dutch Clock gable with rococo decorations in Hoorn

The clock gable (Dutch: klokgevel), also known as Dutch clock gable, is a gable or facade with decorative shape characteristic of traditional Dutch architecture. The top of the gable is shaped like the cross-section of a church bell. It was mostly used in houses that were rather narrow, with a width of the space taken by two or three windows.

This type of gable was popular in the Netherlands during the 17th and 18th centuries. The earlier clock gables were usually lower and decorated in a different style in which flowers and fruits were present in the decorative elements. Clock gables made in the 18th century are usually decorated with Louis Quinze ornaments, resulting in more decorations added to the flowers and fruits.

Clock gables are also present in Cape Dutch architecture, in what was South Africa's Cape Province.

== See also ==
- Dutch gable
- Stepped gable
- Cape Dutch architecture
