= Chattel house =

Barbadian type of wooden house

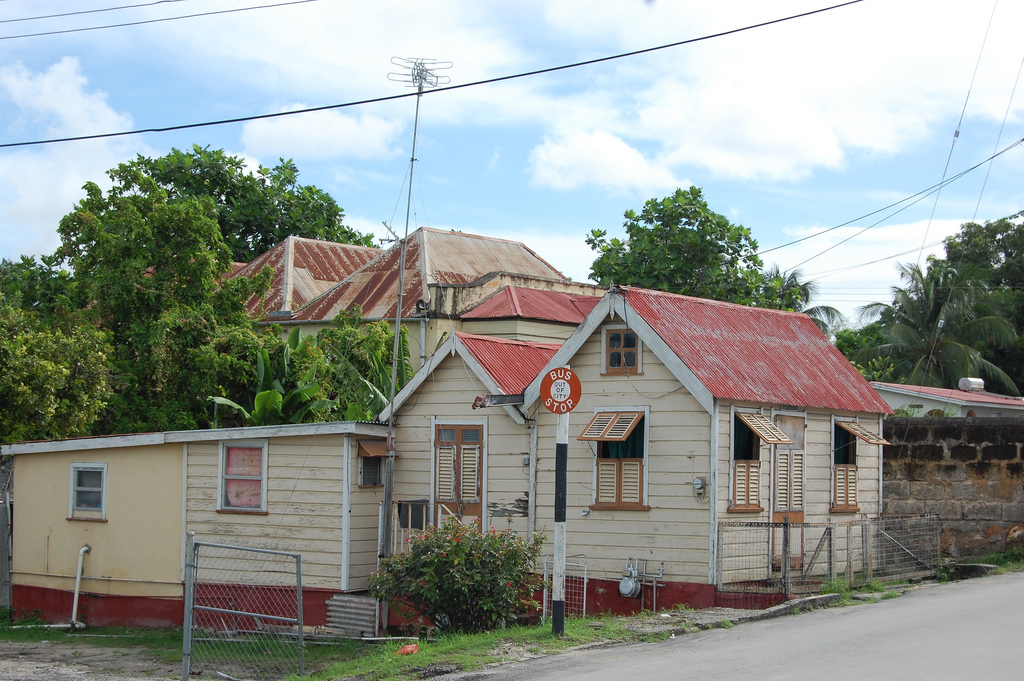
Chattel house in Barbados with additions.

Chattel house is a Barbadian term for a small moveable wooden house that working class people would occupy. The term goes back to the plantation days when the home owners would buy houses designed to move from one property to another. The word "chattel" means movable property so the name was appropriate. Chattel houses are set on blocks or a groundsill rather than being anchored into the ground. In addition, they are built entirely out of wood and assembled without nails. This allowed them to be disassembled (along with the blocks) and moved from place to place. This system was necessary historically because home "owners" typically did not own the land that their house was set on. Instead, their employer often owned the land. In case of a landlord tenant (or employer/employee) dispute, the house could be quickly moved to a new property.

It has been customary for people in Barbados to build additions onto their chattel houses. As such, the house may look as though different sections are at slightly different heights or in a different pattern due to each part being constructed at different stages.

Modern chattel houses tend to have a greater degree of permanence, as they are often connected to the electricity mains, and may either have a permanent septic tank or be connected to a public sewer system.

== Dimensions ==
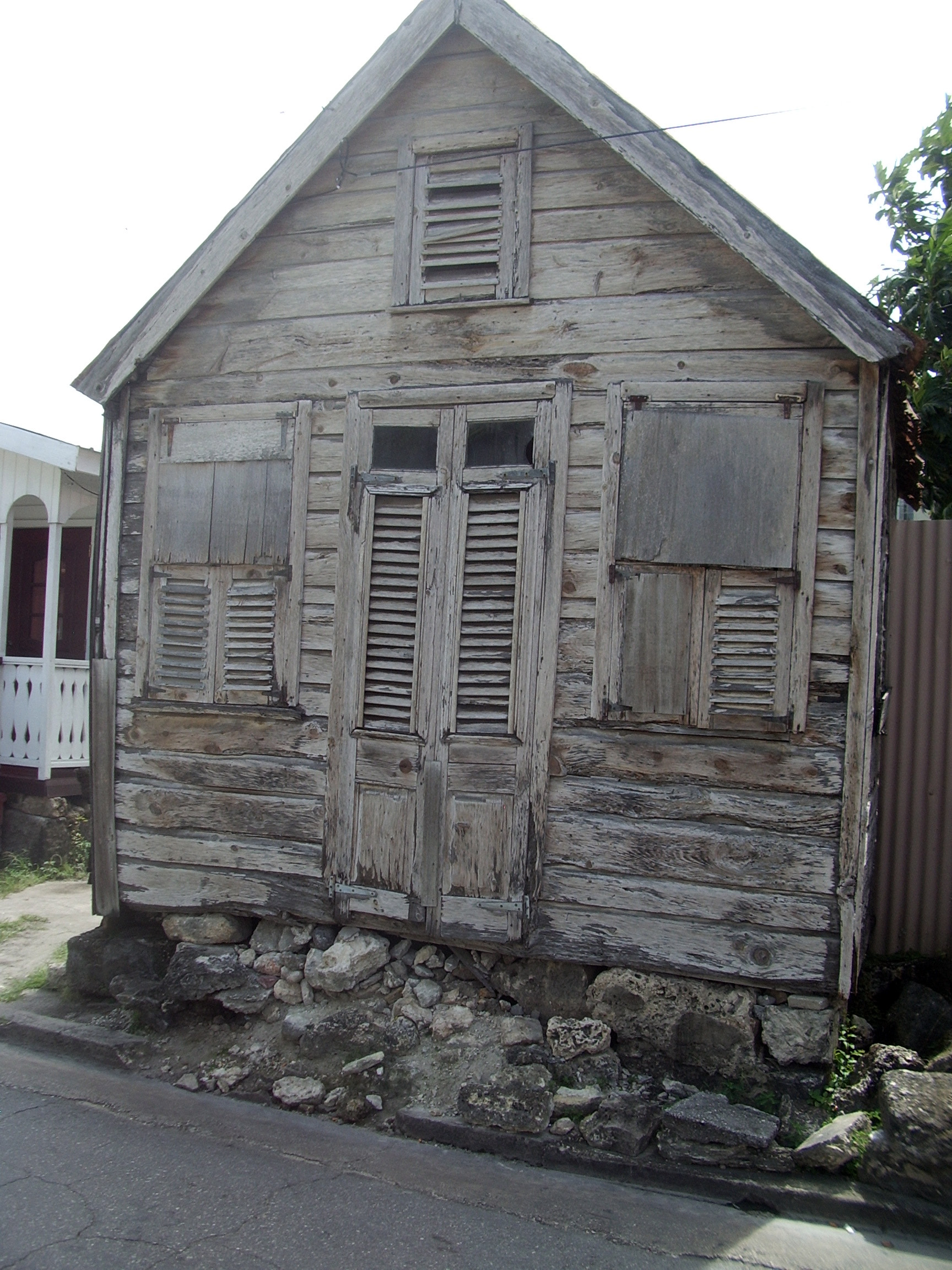
Bridgetown, Barbados.

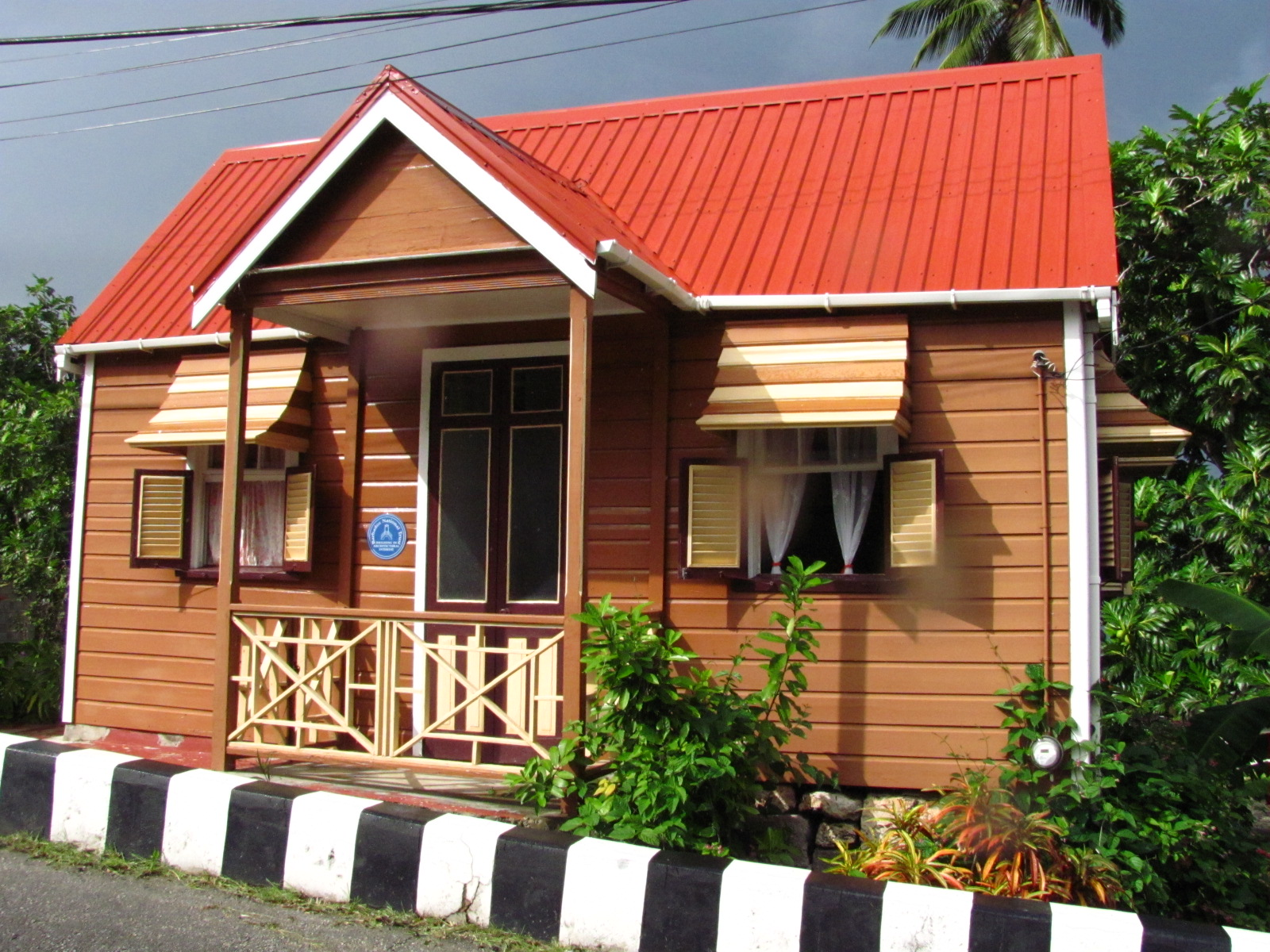
Front of chattel house.

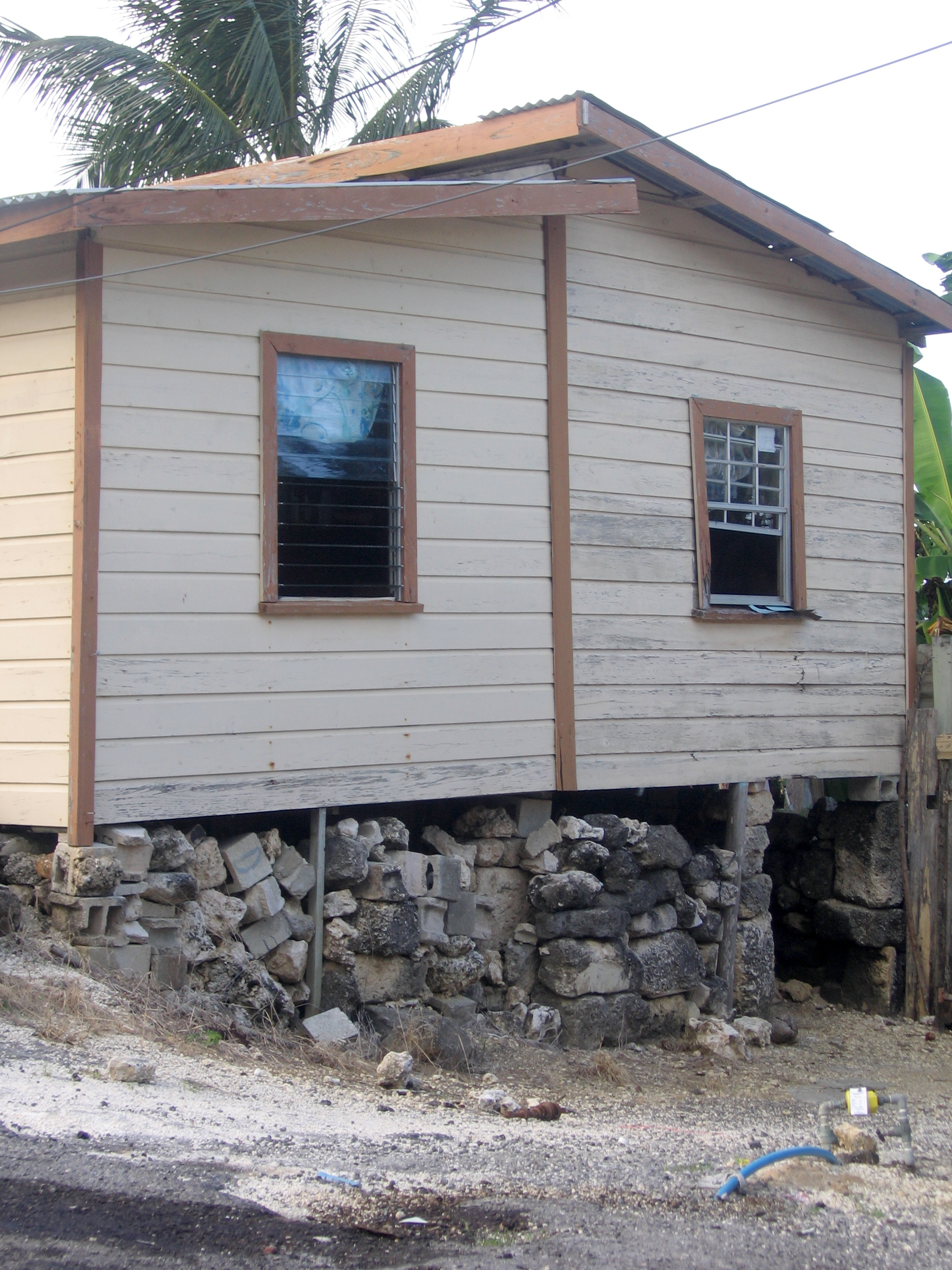
Chattel house supported by loose rocks, Saint John, Barbados.

Timbers were in pre-cut in standard lengths of 12 to 20 feet (even numbers). The front façades tend to be symmetrical, with the door in centre flanked by a window (equally spaced), on each side. As the financial situation changed additions would be made. The roofs were often made of corrugated metal made of iron.

- A single unit was the first-step and consisted of two rooms within. By nickname, these were often called a "one-roof house".
- Next, a shed may be added onto the back. The second roof added, was often called the "shed roof". Creating what was commonly called a "one-roof house and shed".
- Further-yet another roof was often later added on to the home, transforming it into a "two-roof house and shed". In some cases a "three-roof house" might even be developed with a final shed at the back for use as a kitchen.

As the dimensions changed the style of roofs also changed. These earlier styles gave way to the four-sided roof called the 'hip'. or the steep two-sided gable'. Since then many homes have also transitioned to a more 'flat top' roof with a minimal slope.

== Usage in other Caribbean countries ==
Although the term is strongly associated with Barbados, it is also used as a legal term in other countries including Trinidad (e.g. CHAPTER 59:54 LAND TENANTS ACT and Maharaj v. Constance 1981), the British Virgin Islands (see section 6(3) of the Small Tenements Act (Cap 73)), and other islands.

Chattel houses are still in use on several West Indian islands, although they have become much less common in areas still affected by seasonal hurricanes (Barbados and Trinidad lie outside of the Caribbean hurricane belt).
