= A Guide to the Old Buildings of the Cape =

Book by Hans Fransen

- Author: Hans Fransen
- Language: English
- Subject: architecture
- Genre: reference
- Publisher: A.A. Balkema
- Publication date: 1980
- Publication place: South Africa
- Media type: hardcover
- Pages: 456
- ISBN: 0869611232

The Old Buildings of the Cape is a book by Hans Fransen, subtitled in its latest edition A survey of extant architecture from before c. 1910 in the area of Cape Town–Calvinia–Colesberg–Uitenhage. It lists extant and lost buildings and structures in the Cape Province of South Africa. First published in 1965 and since updated, the book is a widely recognised desk reference on the subject.

Corroborating sources include Picard, Pearse, Lewcock and Obholzer.

== Examples ==
Notable buildings listed in the book include:

- Castle of Good Hope
- Koopmans-de Wet House
- Palm Tree Mosque
