= Cape Dutch architecture =

Architectural style in South Africa

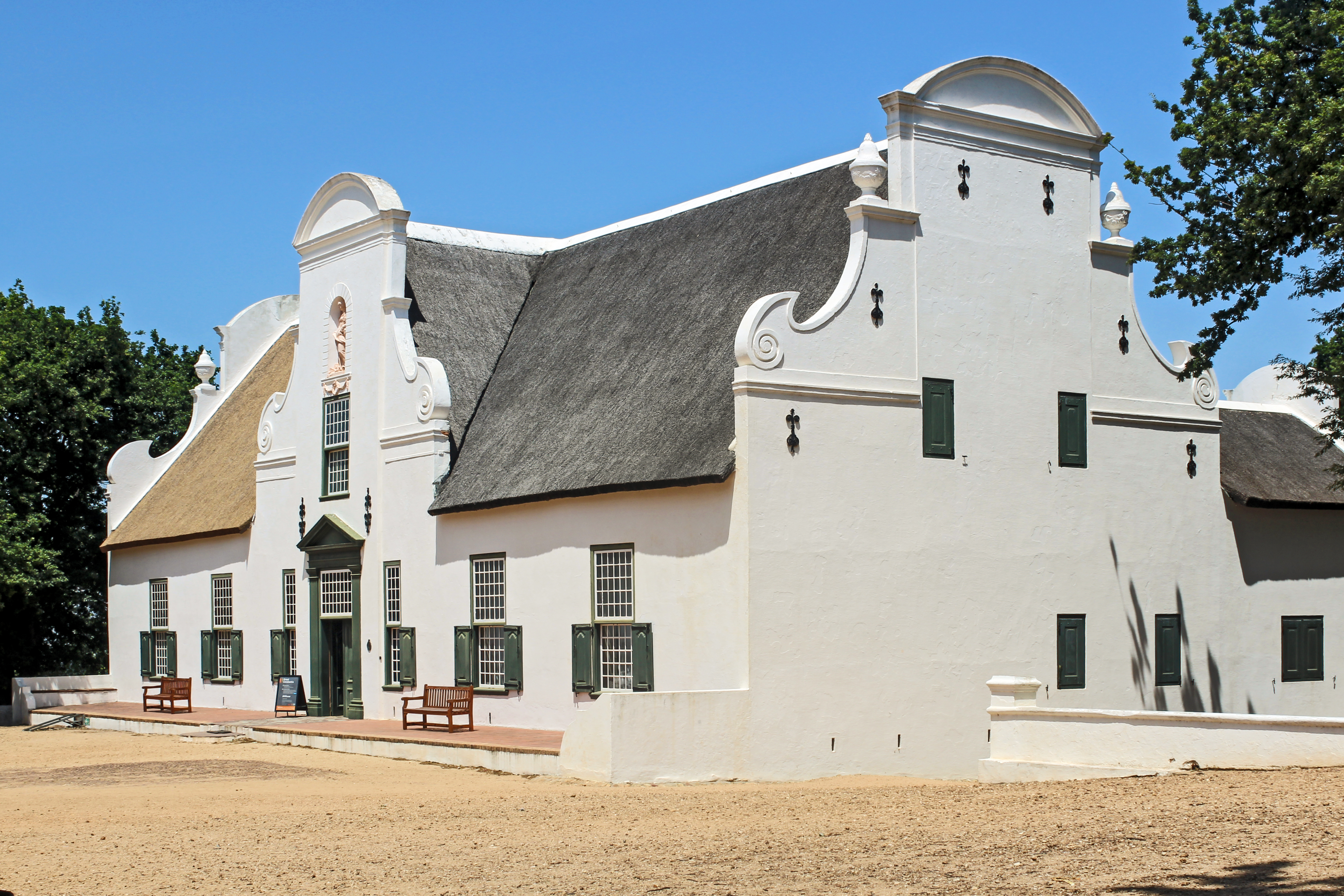
The main house of the Groot Constantia vineyard near Cape Town, South Africa.

Cape Dutch architecture is an architectural style primarily found in the Western Cape of South Africa, though modern adaptations have been constructed in regions such as Western Australia and New Zealand, typically on wine estates. The style emerged in the 17th century during the early years of the Dutch Cape Colony, and is named after the Dutch settlers who played a significant role in its development. Influences on the style can be traced to medieval architectural traditions from the Netherlands, Germany, France, and Indonesia.

== Architectural features ==
A notable feature of Cape Dutch buildings is the grand, ornately rounded clock gable, similar to those seen in Dutch townhouses in the Netherlands, built in the Dutch style. However, this is not a defining feature of the style, as some Cape Dutch buildings, such as the Uitkyk manor house in Stellenbosch, South Africa, do not have gables but are still considered part of the style.

In the late 18th century, a variation of Cape Dutch architecture influenced by Georgian neoclassicism became popular. However, only three houses built in this style remain. The typical floor plan of Cape Dutch buildings follows an H-shape, with a central front section flanked by two perpendicular wings.

Cape Dutch architecture is characterized by several defining elements, including:

- Whitewashed walls
- Thatched roofing
- Large wooden sash cottage panes
- External wooden shutters
- Long horizontal structures, usually single or double story, often with dormer windows
- Green detailing, commonly used for doors and shutters
- Central gables, often reminiscent of Dutch canal houses, though not universally present

== Influence and preservation ==
Many original Cape Dutch buildings in Cape Town were demolished due to urban development, particularly during the 1960s when high-rise buildings were constructed in the City Bowl. However, the style remains well-preserved in historical towns and wine estates along South Africa’s Cape Winelands, including Stellenbosch, Paarl, Swellendam, Franschhoek, Tulbagh, and Graaff-Reinet.

Gables are a particularly notable element of Cape Dutch architecture. Earlier research compared their decorative forms to those of Amsterdam, though by the second half of the 18th century, gable construction had declined in Amsterdam itself. Instead, architectural similarities have been drawn between South African gables and those found along the Zaan River in the Netherlands, where the tradition remained strong at the time of Dutch settlement of the Cape by the Dutch United East India Company (VOC).

== Cape Dutch Revival ==
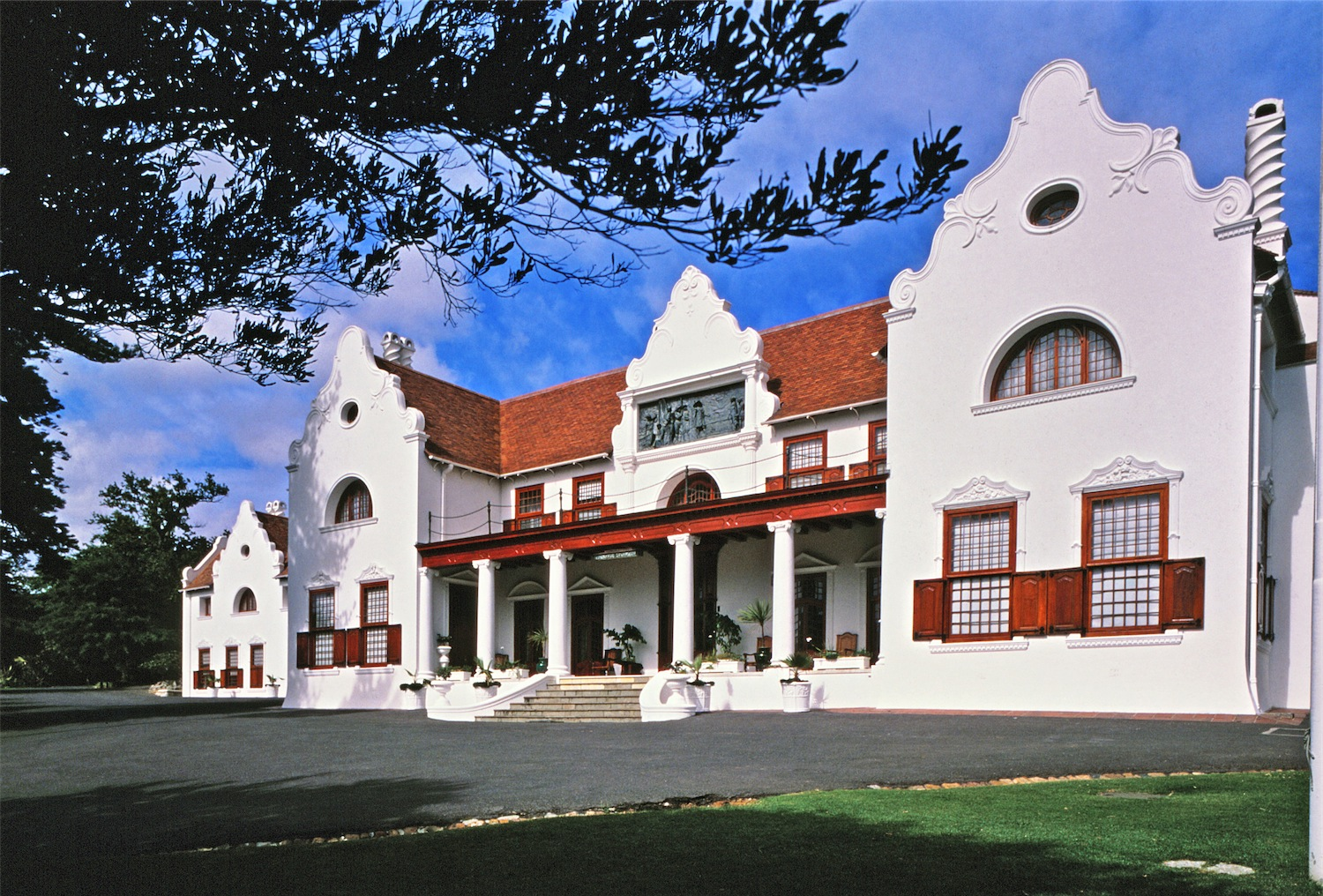
Groote Schuur historical estate, pictured in 1988.

By the mid-19th century, Cape Dutch architecture had largely fallen out of favor, and many of its buildings deteriorated. A revival of the style was initiated in 1893 when Cecil John Rhodes purchased Groote Schuur (lit. 'big barn') and commissioned architect Sir Herbert Baker to redesign the manor house. Baker sought to develop a Cape vernacular architectural style, drawing inspiration from existing Cape Dutch structures. However, his design ultimately reflected an English country house with Cape Dutch gables rather than a purely Cape Dutch building. This work contributed to the emergence of the Cape Dutch Revival style.

In 1902, following the British victory in the Anglo–Boer War, Baker moved to Johannesburg, where he introduced the Cape Dutch Revival style to the Witwatersrand, particularly in homes commissioned by wealthy mining magnates known as Randlords. After the establishment of the Union of South Africa in 1910, the Cape Dutch Revival style gained popularity as a national architectural style. Unlike the original Cape Dutch buildings, the revivalist version was primarily characterized by its elaborate gables.

== See also ==
- Dutch colonial architecture
- Dutch Colonial Revival architecture
- Architecture of the Netherlands
- History of Cape Town
- A Guide to the Old Buildings of the Cape
- List of house styles

== Bibliography ==
- Fransen, Hans (2006). Old Towns and Villages of the Cape: A Survey of the Origin and Development of Towns, Villages, and Hamlets at the Cape of Good Hope, with Particular Reference to Their Physical Planning and Historical Townscape. Jonathan Ball Publishers. ISBN 978-1-86842-227-2.
- "The Old Buildings Of The Cape by Hans Fransen". I H Pentz Booksellers.
