= List of heritage sites in Stellenbosch =

This is a list of heritage sites in Stellenbosch in the Western Cape, as recognized by the South African Heritage Resource Agency.

== Heritage sites in Stellenbosch town ==
SAHRA identifier	Site name	Description	Town	District	NHRA status	Coordinates	Image
9/2/084/0001	STELLENBOSCH MUNICIPAL AREA, GENERAL		Stellenbosch	Stellenbosch			Media related to Oak trees in Stellenbosch at Wikimedia Commons
9/2/084/0001-026	Oak trees, Dorp Street and The Avenue, Stellenbosch	Dorp Street is the old wagon road to Cape Town and, just like three centuries ago, visitors still enter the town along the same road. Thus the old street rightly serves as an introduction to the Town of Oaks, for on both sides of the street one sees the beautiful, shady and gnarled old oak trees of which the biggest old giants probably date back to 1760. The age of the others dates back to the year 1812. The increase in modern traffic which makes the widening of the streets essential, has threatened the life of these trees, but with the cordial co-operation of the Municipality the trees in Dorp Street, between the railway line and Pastorie Street and those in the Avenue between Pastorie and Van Riebeeck Streets, have been proclaimed historical monuments. However, a new danger—leaf-blight—now threatens these ancient trees. Proclaimed 1950.	Stellenbosch	Stellenbosch	Provincial Heritage Site	33°55′56″S 18°51′37″E	Dorp Street is the old wagon road to Cape Town and, just like three centuries ago, visitors still enter the town along the same road. Thus the old street rightly serves as an introduction to the Town of Oaks, for on both sides of the street one sees the beautiful, shady and gnarled old oak trees of which the biggest old giants probably date back to 1760. The age of the others dates back to the year 1812. The increase in modern traffic which makes the widening of the streets essential, has threatened the life of these trees, but with the cordial co-operation of the Municipality the trees in Dorp Street, between the railway line and Pastorie Street and those in the Avenue between Pastorie and Van Riebeeck Streets, have been proclaimed historical monuments. However, a new danger—leaf-blight—now threatens these ancient trees. Proclaimed 1950.
9/2/084/0001-027	Oak trees, Parsonage Street, Church Street, Drostdy Street, Ryneveld Street, Andringa Street, Bird Street, Plein Street and Van Riebeeck Street, Stellenbosch	In 1968 the oak trees in the following streets were also proclaimed historical monuments: Pastorie, Church, Drostdy, Ryneveld, Crozier, Andringa, Bird and Van Riebeeck Streets.	Stellenbosch	Stellenbosch	Provincial Heritage Site	33°56′16″S 18°51′44″E	In 1968 the oak trees in the following streets were also proclaimed historical monuments: Pastorie, Church, Drostdy, Ryneveld, Crozier, Andringa, Bird and Van Riebeeck Streets. Media related to Oak trees in Stellenbosch at Wikimedia Commons
9/2/084/0002/03	Ida Minor, Idas Valley, Stellebosch District		Stellenbosch	Stellenbosch	National Monument		Upload Photo
9/2/084/0002/18	Wedgewood Farm, Idas Valley, Stellebosch District		Stellenbosch	Stellenbosch	National Monument		Upload Photo
9/2/084/0003	Devonshire House, 13 Ryneveld Street, Stellenbosch	The Devonshire House is situated on the oldest street corner of Stellenbosch and was erected here in about 1861. It is a double-storeyed townhouse in the early Victorian style.	Stellenbosch	Stellenbosch	Provincial Heritage Site	33°56′16″S 18°51′46″E	The Devonshire House is situated on the oldest street corner of Stellenbosch and was erected here in about 1861. It is a double-storeyed townhouse in the early Victorian style. Media related to Devonshire House, Stellenbosch at Wikimedia Commons
9/2/084/0004	Oude Leeskamer, 182 Dorp Street, Stellenbosch	This building was originally used by the College of Landdrost and Heemraden as offices. The foundation meeting for the educational institution which was to become known as the Gymnasium, was held here in 1863. Before the completion of the Gymnasium building in 1866, the Oude Leeskamer was used as a school building for three months.	Stellenbosch	Stellenbosch	Provincial Heritage Site	33°56′18″S 18°51′49″E	This building was originally used by the College of Landdrost and Heemraden as offices. The foundation meeting for the educational institution which was to become known as the Gymnasium, was held here in 1863. Before the completion of the Gymnasium building in 1866, the Oude Leeskamer was used as a school building for three months. Media related to Oude Leeskamer at Wikimedia Commons
9/2/084/0005	Mostertsdrift, Jonkershoek Road, Stellenbosch	Mostertsdrift, the ancestral farm of the Mostert family in South Africa, is also one of those farms which is really older than the town itself. Johannes (Jan) Cornelisz Mostert together with his wife, Alida van Hulst, came to the Cape about 1672. Shortly before Simon van der Stel’s arrival, permission was given to Mostert and Pieter Visagie to cultivate the farm Buffelscop to the east of the Tygerberg. But, Buffelscop was a loan-farm and when Simon van der Stel announced in November 1679 that freehold land was available to all who wished to settle along the banks of the Eerste River, Jan Mostert availed himself of the offer. He chose the beautiful piece of land on the north bank of the Eerste River where the present residential area, Mostertsdrift, is situated. The homestead of Mostertsdrift, situated among shady oak-trees and surrounded by a high wall, is not only part of the early history of the Town of Oaks, but also an elegant example of an old-fashioned, aristocratic group of farm-buildings in the Boland.	Stellenbosch	Stellenbosch	Provincial Heritage Site	33°56′05″S 18°52′53″E	Mostertsdrift, the ancestral farm of the Mostert family in South Africa, is also one of those farms which is really older than the town itself. Johannes (Jan) Cornelisz Mostert together with his wife, Alida van Hulst, came to the Cape about 1672. Shortly before Simon van der Stel’s arrival, permission was given to Mostert and Pieter Visagie to cultivate the farm Buffelscop to the east of the Tygerberg. But, Buffelscop was a loan-farm and when Simon van der Stel announced in November 1679 that freehold land was available to all who wished to settle along the banks of the Eerste River, Jan Mostert availed himself of the offer. He chose the beautiful piece of land on the north bank of the Eerste River where the present residential area, Mostertsdrift, is situated. The homestead of Mostertsdrift, situated among shady oak-trees and surrounded by a high wall, is not only part of the early history of the Town of Oaks, but also an elegant example of an old-fashioned, aristocratic group of farm-buildings in the Boland. Media related to Mostertsdrift at Wikimedia Commons
9/2/084/0007	Kromme Rhee, Koelenhof, Stellenbosch District		Stellenbosch	Stellenbosch	National Monument	33°52′21″S 18°49′36″E	Upload Photo
9/2/084/0009	Stellenbosch Museum, 18 Ryneveld Street, Stellenbosch		Stellenbosch	Stellenbosch	National Monument	33°56′07″S 18°51′44″E	Upload Photo
9/2/084/0010	Jannie Marais House, Coetzenburg, Noordwal East, Stellenbosch	The site with the historic old Coetzenburg farmstead (now known as the Stellenbosch Jannie Marais House), the cellar and outbuildings thereon, together with that portion of land north of the house and extending to the banks of the Eerste River.	Stellenbosch	Stellenbosch	Provincial Heritage Site	33°56′17″S 18°52′12″E	The site with the historic old Coetzenburg farmstead (now known as the Stellenbosch Jannie Marais House), the cellar and outbuildings thereon, together with that portion of land north of the house and extending to the banks of the Eerste River. Media related to Jannie Marais House at Wikimedia Commons
9/2/084/0011	Die Laan, Stellenbosch		Stellenbosch	Stellenbosch	National Monument	33°56′19″S 18°52′00″E	Media related to 24 The Avenue, Stellenbosch at Wikimedia Commons
9/2/084/0011/002	24 The Avenue, Stellenbosch	The property, together with the Georgian dwelling thereon.	Stellenbosch	Stellenbosch	Provincial Heritage Site	33°55′56″S 18°51′37″E	The property, together with the Georgian dwelling thereon. Media related to 24 The Avenue, Stellenbosch at Wikimedia Commons
9/2/084/0011/004	Moedersloon, 8 The Avenue, Stellenbosch		Stellenbosch	Stellenbosch	Provincial Heritage Site	33°55′03″S 18°50′40″E	Media related to Moedersloon, Stellenbosch at Wikimedia Commons
9/2/084/0011/1	6 Die Laan, Stellenbosch		Stellenbosch	Stellenbosch		33°56′19″S 18°51′55″E	Upload Photo
9/2/084/0011/3	22 Die Laan, Stellenbosch		Stellenbosch	Stellenbosch	Pending Declaration	33°56′18″S 18°52′03″E	Upload Photo
9/2/084/0011/5	20 Die Laan, Stellenbosch		Stellenbosch	Stellenbosch	National Monument	33°56′18″S 18°52′02″E	Upload Photo
9/2/084/0012	Officers' Mess, 15 Market Street, Stellenbosch	This interesting architectural complex of houses, which dates mainly from the 19th century, forms an integral part of the entire western side of Market Street, as well as of the historic core of Stellenbosch itself.	Stellenbosch	Stellenbosch	Provincial Heritage Site	33°56′19″S 18°51′18″E	This interesting architectural complex of houses, which dates mainly from the 19th century, forms an integral part of the entire western side of Market Street, as well as of the historic core of Stellenbosch itself. Media related to 15 Market Street, Stellenbosch at Wikimedia Commons
9/2/084/0013	Homestead, Jonkershoek, Stellenbosch District		Stellenbosch	Stellenbosch	National Monument		Upload Photo
9/2/084/0014	Mill stream, Stellenbosch	That portion of the mill stream that stretches from Erf 1629 in Mostertsdrift in a north-westerly direction up to Marais Street; thence in a westerly direction in Van Riebeeck Street up to Andringa Street; thence in a south-westerly direction up to the eastern boundary of Erf 6460 and thence in a north-westerly direction up to the intersection of Skone Uitsig and Alexander Streets.	Stellenbosch	Stellenbosch	Provincial Heritage Site	33°56′14″S 18°52′13″E	That portion of the mill stream that stretches from Erf 1629 in Mostertsdrift in a north-westerly direction up to Marais Street; thence in a westerly direction in Van Riebeeck Street up to Andringa Street; thence in a south-westerly direction up to the eastern boundary of Erf 6460 and thence in a north-westerly direction up to the intersection of Skone Uitsig and Alexander Streets. Media related to Mill stream, Stellenbosch at Wikimedia Commons
9/2/084/0015	Proteahof, 80–120 Ryneveld Street, Stellenbosch	This building complex, which was erected shortly after 1860, originally formed part of a housing scheme for former slaves. The cottages have been restored.	Stellenbosch	Stellenbosch	Provincial Heritage Site	33°55′45″S 18°51′42″E	This building complex, which was erected shortly after 1860, originally formed part of a housing scheme for former slaves. The cottages have been restored. Media related to Proteahof at Wikimedia Commons
9/2/084/0016	Historical Trees in Stellenbosch		Stellenbosch	Stellenbosch	National Monument		Upload Photo
9/2/084/0017	1 Herold Street, Stellenbosch		Stellenbosch	Stellenbosch		33°56′24″S 18°51′09″E	Upload Photo
9/2/084/0018	Zevenrivieren, Banhoek, Stellenbosch District		Stellenbosch	Stellenbosch			Upload Photo
9/2/084/0019	Stellenbosch Hotel, 160 Dorp Street, Stellenbosch		Stellenbosch	Stellenbosch	Provincial Heritage Site	33°56′19″S 18°51′45″E	Media related to Stellenbosch Hotel at Wikimedia Commons
9/2/084/0021	Coachman's Cottage, 40 Alexander Street, Stellenbosch	Across the road from the Burgher House, next to the Divisional Council Offices, stands this charming thatched cottage, with its dormer window in front and attractive concavo-convex side gables.	Stellenbosch	Stellenbosch	Provincial Heritage Site	33°56′10″S 18°51′19″E	Across the road from the Burgher House, next to the Divisional Council Offices, stands this charming thatched cottage, with its dormer window in front and attractive concavo-convex side gables. Media related to Coachman's Cottage, Stellenbosch at Wikimedia Commons
9/2/084/0022	Leef op Hoop/Klein Gustrouw, Jonkershoek, Stellenbosch District		Stellenbosch	Stellenbosch	National Monument		Upload Photo
9/2/084/0023	Lanzerac, Jonkershoek, Stellenbosch	Granted to Isaac Schryver in 1692. In 1806 the farm passed to Coenraad Johannes Fick who probably built Lanzerac around 1830 in the Cape Dutch style.	Stellenbosch	Stellenbosch	Provincial Heritage Site	33°56′16″S 18°53′39″E	Granted to Isaac Schryver in 1692. In 1806 the farm passed to Coenraad Johannes Fick who probably built Lanzerac around 1830 in the Cape Dutch style. Media related to Lanzerac at Wikimedia Commons
9/2/084/0024	Rhenish Mission Church, Blom Street, Stellenbosch	The lovely old Rhenish Mission Church with its fine gables, built in the form of an incomplete T, faces the southern side of the Braak. This is one of the oldest mission churches in South Africa. The delicate architectural treatment which betrays strong Renaissance influence, is typical of early 19th-century architecture. The gable, which bears the date of its erection, 1823, is one of the finest of its kind. In 1840 the northern wing was built.	Stellenbosch	Stellenbosch	Provincial Heritage Site	33°56′17″S 18°51′32″E	The lovely old Rhenish Mission Church with its fine gables, built in the form of an incomplete T, faces the southern side of the Braak. This is one of the oldest mission churches in South Africa. The delicate architectural treatment which betrays strong Renaissance influence, is typical of early 19th-century architecture. The gable, which bears the date of its erection, 1823, is one of the finest of its kind. In 1840 the northern wing was built. Media related to Rhenish Mission Church, Stellenbosch at Wikimedia Commons
9/2/084/0024/001	Pulpit, Rhenish Mission Church, Blom Street, Stellenbosch	The Rhenish Church facing the Braak is not only known for its history and its architectural qualities, but also for the fine pulpit inside it. The pulpit and lectern were made by Simon Pieter Christoffel Londt in 1853.	Stellenbosch	Stellenbosch	Heritage Object		Upload Photo
9/2/084/0024/1	Pulpit, Rhenish Church, The Braak, Stellenbosch		Stellenbosch	Stellenbosch	National Monument	33°56′16″S 18°51′32″E	Upload Photo
9/2/084/0027	Schreuder House, 10 Ryneveld Street, Stellenbosch	This colonial house was built in 1709 by Sebastian Schreuder and is the oldest known existent dwelling in South Africa.	Stellenbosch	Stellenbosch	Provincial Heritage Site	33°56′16″S 18°51′47″E	This colonial house was built in 1709 by Sebastian Schreuder and is the oldest known existent dwelling in South Africa. Media related to Schreuder House at Wikimedia Commons
9/2/084/0028	17 Van Riebeeck Street, Stellenbosch		Stellenbosch	Stellenbosch	National Monument	33°56′13″S 18°51′59″E	Upload Photo
9/2/084/0029	Gujjatul Islam Jamaah Mosque, Banhoek Road, Stellenbosch		Stellenbosch	Stellenbosch		33°55′50″S 18°51′33″E	Upload Photo
9/2/084/0030	Bergzicht Market Square, Stellenbosch		Stellenbosch	Stellenbosch			Upload Photo
9/2/084/0031	99 Dorp Street, Stellenbosch		Stellenbosch	Stellenbosch		33°56′22″S 18°51′30″E	Upload Photo
9/2/084/0034	21 Van Riebeeck Street, Stellenbosch		Stellenbosch	Stellenbosch	National Monument	33°56′13″S 18°52′01″E	Upload Photo
9/2/084/0035	Army Club, 15 Market Street, Stellenbosch		Stellenbosch	Stellenbosch		33°56′20″S 18°51′17″E	Upload Photo
9/2/084/0036	Annandale Farm, Stellenbosch		Stellenbosch	Stellenbosch	National Monument	33°59′49″S 18°49′51″E	Upload Photo
9/2/084/0037	19 Riebeeck Street, Stellenbosch		Stellenbosch	Stellenbosch		33°56′13″S 18°52′00″E	Upload Photo
9/2/084/0038	137 Dorp Street, Stellenbosch		Stellenbosch	Stellenbosch		33°56′20″S 18°51′38″E	Upload Photo
9/2/084/0039	Fynbos Guesthouse, 14 Neethling Street, Stellenbosch		Stellenbosch	Stellenbosch	Register	33°56′14″S 18°52′00″E	Media related to Fynbos Villa, Stellenbosch at Wikimedia Commons
9/2/084/0040	17 Market Street, Stellenbosch		Stellenbosch	Stellenbosch	Register	33°56′21″S 18°51′16″E	Upload Photo
9/2/084/0042	34 Church Street, Stellenbosch		Stellenbosch	Stellenbosch		33°56′16″S 18°51′44″E	Upload Photo
9/2/084/0043	36 Church Street, Stellenbosch		Stellenbosch	Stellenbosch		33°56′16″S 18°51′44″E	Upload Photo
9/2/084/0044	Kromme Rivier, Paul Kruger Street, Stellenbosch		Stellenbosch	Stellenbosch		33°55′40″S 18°51′24″E	Media related to Krommerivier Barn, Stellenbosch at Wikimedia Commons
9/2/084/0044-001	Kromme Rivier (Barn), Hofman Street, Stellenbosch	The building described as the Krommerivier Barn is situated at the corner of Hofman and Kruger Streets. This barn is a reconstruction, to its 1850s appearance, of one of the oldest surviving buildings in Stellenbosch: a rare long outbuilding dating from the 1730s. The barn has been used as a coachhouse and stables, storage area and human habitation.	Stellenbosch	Stellenbosch	Register	33°55′52″S 18°51′21″E	The building described as the Krommerivier Barn is situated at the corner of Hofman and Kruger Streets. This barn is a reconstruction, to its 1850s appearance, of one of the oldest surviving buildings in Stellenbosch: a rare long outbuilding dating from the 1730s. The barn has been used as a coachhouse and stables, storage area and human habitation. Media related to Krommerivier Barn, Stellenbosch at Wikimedia Commons
9/2/084/0045	Voet van Helderberg, Stellenbosch		Stellenbosch	Stellenbosch	Pending Declaration	34°02′09″S 18°51′41″E	Upload Photo
9/2/084/0046	176 Dorp Street, Stellenbosch	This typical town house with slave quarters originally dates from the 18th century. The building was altered to its present form in 1813 when it became the residence of the Secretary to the College of Landdrost and Heemraden.	Stellenbosch	Stellenbosch	Provincial Heritage Site	33°56′18″S 18°51′48″E	This typical town house with slave quarters originally dates from the 18th century. The building was altered to its present form in 1813 when it became the residence of the Secretary to the College of Landdrost and Heemraden. Media related to 176 Dorp Street, Stellenbosch at Wikimedia Commons
9/2/084/0047	Bergzicht Farmstead, Stellenbosch		Stellenbosch	Stellenbosch	National Monument	33°56′01″S 18°51′30″E	Upload Photo
9/2/084/0048	3 Ryneveld Street, Stellenbosch		Stellenbosch	Stellenbosch	Provincial Heritage Site	33°56′17″S 18°51′47″E	Media related to 3 Ryneveld Street, Stellenbosch at Wikimedia Commons
9/2/084/0049	Zorgvliet West, Stellenbosch		Stellenbosch	Stellenbosch	National Monument	33°54′53″S 18°56′08″E	Upload Photo
9/2/084/0050	Bletterman House, Plein Street, Stellenbosch		Stellenbosch	Stellenbosch	Provincial Heritage Site	33°56′13″S 18°51′40″E	Media related to Bletterman House at Wikimedia Commons
9/2/084/0051	Grosvenor House, Drostdy Street, Stellenbosch	Grosvenor House is situated next to the Dutch Reformed Church in Drostdy Street. Grosvenor House is associated with the oldest and best-known Stellenbosch and, therefore, South African families. The land on which it stands was granted to Christiaan Ludolph Neethling in 1781. He came to the Cape from Germany in 1741 and became the progenitor of this widespread Afrikaans family. The building also provides a clear demonstration of how a simple structure could develop into a worthy example of Cape architecture. The house that Christiaan Neethling built consisted of a row of single-storeyed thatched rooms in Drostdy Street. At the end of the 18th and beginning of the 19th centuries a gable was added above the front door and a room was built on at the back which gave the building the shape of a T. Later additions made it into a full-scale H-shaped house. The sick-comforter, Herold, F added a second storey with a flat roof, an alteration that was at first probably confined to the front part of the house. These changes gave the house a completely new façade: four fluted pilasters with a richly ornamented cornice; a teak stable-door framed by shorter, ribbed pilasters; teak sash-windows with inner shutters of stinkwood and, right at the top, a little palm tree in bas relief, taken from the crest of the community. This is how the house still stands today. The outbuildings on either side of the main house were probably also built in Herold time. Frederick Neethling who occupied the house just when the late Georgian style was fashionable, was probably responsible for the wagon-wheel fanlight. The house, a cultural treasure in its own right, is a worthy repository for relics of the history of Stellenbosch and its neighbourhood.	Stellenbosch	Stellenbosch	Provincial Heritage Site	33°56′07″S 18°51′44″E	Grosvenor House is situated next to the Dutch Reformed Church in Drostdy Street. Grosvenor House is associated with the oldest and best-known Stellenbosch and, therefore, South African families. The land on which it stands was granted to Christiaan Ludolph Neethling in 1781. He came to the Cape from Germany in 1741 and became the progenitor of this widespread Afrikaans family. The building also provides a clear demonstration of how a simple structure could develop into a worthy example of Cape architecture. The house that Christiaan Neethling built consisted of a row of single-storeyed thatched rooms in Drostdy Street. At the end of the 18th and beginning of the 19th centuries a gable was added above the front door and a room was built on at the back which gave the building the shape of a T. Later additions made it into a full-scale H-shaped house. The sick-comforter, Herold, F added a second storey with a flat roof, an alteration that was at first probably confined to the front part of the house. These changes gave the house a completely new façade: four fluted pilasters with a richly ornamented cornice; a teak stable-door framed by shorter, ribbed pilasters; teak sash-windows with inner shutters of stinkwood and, right at the top, a little palm tree in bas relief, taken from the crest of the community. This is how the house still stands today. The outbuildings on either side of the main house were probably also built in Herold time. Frederick Neethling who occupied the house just when the late Georgian style was fashionable, was probably responsible for the wagon-wheel fanlight. The house, a cultural treasure in its own right, is a worthy repository for relics of the history of Stellenbosch and its neighbourhood. Media related to Grosvenor House, Stellenbosch at Wikimedia Commons
9/2/084/0052	Old College Buildings, Stellenbosch		Stellenbosch	Stellenbosch	National Monument		Upload Photo
9/2/084/0053	5 Minserie Street, Stellenbosch		Stellenbosch	Stellenbosch	Provincial Heritage Site	33°56′15″S 18°51′53″E	Media related to 5 Minserie Street, Stellenbosch at Wikimedia Commons
9/2/084/0054	Erfurt house, 37 Ryneveld Street, Stellenbosch		Stellenbosch	Stellenbosch	National Monument	33°56′07″S 18°51′44″E	Upload Photo
9/2/084/0055	Rhenish Parsonage complex, Market Street, Stellenbosch	All the buildings of the Rhenish Parsonage Complex, built on land granted to Marthinus Byleveld in 1785, date from the beginning of the 19th century. The main building is the former parsonage of the Rhenish Church and dates from 1815. One of the back wings of this H-shaped parsonage is connected with the other two buildings forming part of the complex. Of these the so-called Leipoldt House with its large proportions dates from approximately 1832, while the third building with its low dormer gable was converted into a double-storey in about 1860. On one side, the Rhenish Parsonage Complex is enclosed by a long circular wall.	Stellenbosch	Stellenbosch	Provincial Heritage Site	33°56′19″S 18°51′18″E	All the buildings of the Rhenish Parsonage Complex, built on land granted to Marthinus Byleveld in 1785, date from the beginning of the 19th century. The main building is the former parsonage of the Rhenish Church and dates from 1815. One of the back wings of this H-shaped parsonage is connected with the other two buildings forming part of the complex. Of these the so-called Leipoldt House with its large proportions dates from approximately 1832, while the third building with its low dormer gable was converted into a double-storey in about 1860. On one side, the Rhenish Parsonage Complex is enclosed by a long circular wall. Media related to Rhenish Parsonage, Stellenbosch at Wikimedia Commons
9/2/084/0056	2 Ryneveld Street, Stellenbosch		Stellenbosch	Stellenbosch	National Monument	33°56′17″S 18°51′47″E	Upload Photo
9/2/084/0057	Alto, Annendale Road, Stellenbosch District		Stellenbosch	Stellenbosch	National Monument (?)	34°00′10″S 18°50′49″E	Upload Photo
9/2/084/0058	Erf 3759, Schroder Street, Stellenbosch		Stellenbosch	Stellenbosch			Upload Photo
9/2/084/0059	Faure House, Stellenbosch		Stellenbosch	Stellenbosch		34°01′36″S 18°44′56″E	Upload Photo
9/2/084/0060	Van der Bijl House, 37 Market Street, Stellenbosch	This property forms part of the former farm known as Oude Molen. Adriaan Roux bought the property in 1806 and erected the present house shortly afterwards. It has been in the possession of the Van der Bijl family since 1848.	Stellenbosch	Stellenbosch	Provincial Heritage Site	33°56′19″S 18°51′18″E	This property forms part of the former farm known as Oude Molen. Adriaan Roux bought the property in 1806 and erected the present house shortly afterwards. It has been in the possession of the Van der Bijl family since 1848. Media related to Van der Bijl House at Wikimedia Commons
9/2/084/0060/001	Van der Bijl Cottage, 37A Market Street, Stellenbosch	The original two-roomed Van der Bijl cottage was built in c. 1820, probably as a gardener's cottage. Although extended during its restoration in 1979–1980 the building retains much of its original character and scale. As part of the historical Van der Bijl House complex the cottage not only forms an important and integral part of the aspect of this National Monument, but also contributes to the surrounding historical streetscape.	Stellenbosch	Stellenbosch	Register	33°56′19″S 18°51′17″E	The original two-roomed Van der Bijl cottage was built in c. 1820, probably as a gardener's cottage. Although extended during its restoration in 1979–1980 the building retains much of its original character and scale. As part of the historical Van der Bijl House complex the cottage not only forms an important and integral part of the aspect of this National Monument, but also contributes to the surrounding historical streetscape. Media related to Van der Bijl Cottage at Wikimedia Commons
9/2/084/0061	155 Dorp Street, Stellenbosch	Just as the three single-storeyed semi-detached houses at Nos. 153, 155 and 157 are still linked together, the various families who occupied them throughout the years were often also linked. Nos. 155 and 157 Dorp Street with their modest gables and are also architecturally important.	Stellenbosch	Stellenbosch	Provincial Heritage Site	33°56′20″S 18°51′44″E	Just as the three single-storeyed semi-detached houses at Nos. 153, 155 and 157 are still linked together, the various families who occupied them throughout the years were often also linked. Nos. 155 and 157 Dorp Street with their modest gables and are also architecturally important. Media related to 155 Dorp Street, Stellenbosch at Wikimedia Commons
9/2/084/0062	The Braak, Stellenbosch	Town common (braak means "fallow land") bounded on the north by Alexander Street, on the east by Bird Street, Mill Square and the Church of the Rhenish Mission, on the south by property transferred to J. W. Palen, and on the west by Bloem Street, and the Church of the Rhenish Mission.	Stellenbosch	Stellenbosch	Provincial Heritage Site	33°56′14″S 18°51′31″E	Town common (braak means "fallow land") bounded on the north by Alexander Street, on the east by Bird Street, Mill Square and the Church of the Rhenish Mission, on the south by property transferred to J. W. Palen, and on the west by Bloem Street, and the Church of the Rhenish Mission. Media related to The Braak, Stellenbosch at Wikimedia Commons
9/2/084/0063	Powder Magazine, Blom Street, Stellenbosch	The Braak derives its unique character from the buildings that surround it and one of these is the well-known Powder Magazine. It has been converted into a small museum of relics of the military history of Stellenbosch.	Stellenbosch	Stellenbosch	Provincial Heritage Site	33°56′13″S 18°51′30″E	The Braak derives its unique character from the buildings that surround it and one of these is the well-known Powder Magazine. It has been converted into a small museum of relics of the military history of Stellenbosch. Media related to Powder Magazine, Stellenbosch at Wikimedia Commons
9/2/084/0064	La Gratitude, 95 Dorp Street, Stellenbosch	La Gratitude was built by the Rev. Meent Borcherds, the parson at Stellenbosch from 1786 to 1830, in 1798. He was born at Jangum, East Friesland, in 1762. The house is a U-shaped building with one of the earliest neo-classical pilaster-gables. The pilasters are repeated between the windows. This gives an exceptional dignity to the facade and creates an air of aristocratic pride.	Stellenbosch	Stellenbosch	Provincial Heritage Site	33°56′21″S 18°51′29″E	La Gratitude was built by the Rev. Meent Borcherds, the parson at Stellenbosch from 1786 to 1830, in 1798. He was born at Jangum, East Friesland, in 1762. The house is a U-shaped building with one of the earliest neo-classical pilaster-gables. The pilasters are repeated between the windows. This gives an exceptional dignity to the facade and creates an air of aristocratic pride. Media related to La Gratitude at Wikimedia Commons
9/2/084/0065	Tuinpoort, Plein Street, Stellenbosch	Plein Street, one of the three oldest streets in Stellenbosch, runs from the Braak through the town to Jonkershoek. Opposite the Town Hall, almost hidden between modern business buildings, there is an attractive little gateway with beautiful baroque gables in the style that stood in Plein Street at the end of the 19th century. For many years it was thought to be the entrance to the old graveyard, but later researches and a drawing of Stellenbosch made in 1710 prove that this could not have been the case. The fact that it can no longer be regarded as the entrance to the old cemetery does not detract in the least from its beauty or its architectural and cultural-historical values.	Stellenbosch	Stellenbosch	Provincial Heritage Site	33°56′13″S 18°51′40″E	Plein Street, one of the three oldest streets in Stellenbosch, runs from the Braak through the town to Jonkershoek. Opposite the Town Hall, almost hidden between modern business buildings, there is an attractive little gateway with beautiful baroque gables in the style that stood in Plein Street at the end of the 19th century. For many years it was thought to be the entrance to the old graveyard, but later researches and a drawing of Stellenbosch made in 1710 prove that this could not have been the case. The fact that it can no longer be regarded as the entrance to the old cemetery does not detract in the least from its beauty or its architectural and cultural-historical values. Media related to Tuinpoort, Stellenbosch at Wikimedia Commons
9/2/084/0066	Burgher House, Blom Street, Stellenbosch	There are other exceptional buildings round the Braak; one of the most striking of them is the Burgher House with its fine early pilastered front. It dates to the end of the 18th century and is one of several houses built by Anthonie Fick. Fick acquired the land in 1796 or just before that date, and by the following year this house had already been built. In the course of time several alterations were certainly made to the building, but it was originally built in the form of an H and the distinctive brick and plaster architrave above the front door had survived. This house is an exceptionally fine example of Old Cape Dutch architecture.	Stellenbosch	Stellenbosch	Provincial Heritage Site	33°56′13″S 18°51′30″E	There are other exceptional buildings round the Braak; one of the most striking of them is the Burgher House with its fine early pilastered front. It dates to the end of the 18th century and is one of several houses built by Anthonie Fick. Fick acquired the land in 1796 or just before that date, and by the following year this house had already been built. In the course of time several alterations were certainly made to the building, but it was originally built in the form of an H and the distinctive brick and plaster architrave above the front door had survived. This house is an exceptionally fine example of Old Cape Dutch architecture. Media related to Burgher House, Stellenbosch at Wikimedia Commons
9/2/084/0068	Clock, Administration Building B, University of Stellenbosch, Victoria Street, Stellenbosch	The case of the clock, made of stinkwood, yellowwood and ebony, is most elegant. The heavy base which rests on carved, moulded feet, is particularly striking. From the base there rises the elegant, slender case. The clock is probably the only surviving one that was made at the Cape during the 18th century. It was made by Johann Michael Junck who arrived at the Cape from Furfeld in Germany in the ship Bleijswijk in 1765. This old grandfather clock is an outstanding example of the fine craftsmanship that was practised at the Cape during the 18th century.	Stellenbosch	Stellenbosch	Heritage Object		The case of the clock, made of stinkwood, yellowwood and ebony, is most elegant. The heavy base which rests on carved, moulded feet, is particularly striking. From the base there rises the elegant, slender case. The clock is probably the only surviving one that was made at the Cape during the 18th century. It was made by Johann Michael Junck who arrived at the Cape from Furfeld in Germany in the ship Bleijswijk in 1765. This old grandfather clock is an outstanding example of the fine craftsmanship that was practised at the Cape during the 18th century. Media related to Clock, Stellenbosch University Administration Building B at Wikimedia Commons
9/2/084/0069	St Mary's Church, The Braak, Stellenbosch	St. Mary's Church stands on the corner of the Braak opposite the Drostdy Hotel. This quaint church with its thatched roof has in effect become a part of the history of the Braak and, like the Rhenish Church and the Powder Magazine, makes a notable contribution to its character. This property is, on account of its architectural merits and its situation on The Braak, regarded as a historical monument.	Stellenbosch	Stellenbosch	Provincial Heritage Site	33°56′14″S 18°51′31″E	St. Mary's Church stands on the corner of the Braak opposite the Drostdy Hotel. This quaint church with its thatched roof has in effect become a part of the history of the Braak and, like the Rhenish Church and the Powder Magazine, makes a notable contribution to its character. This property is, on account of its architectural merits and its situation on The Braak, regarded as a historical monument. Media related to St Mary's Church, Stellenbosch at Wikimedia Commons
9/2/084/0070	Divisional Council Building, 46 Alexander Street, Stellenbosch	The Divisional Council Offices and the Drostdy Hotel stand just above the so-called Coachman’s Cottage. The former is a comparatively recent building, while the Drostdy Hotel is older and has its own history. Although it might be difficult to justify the proclamation of these buildings on strictly historical grounds, they have considerable architectural merit and are of such a character that they fit in well with the Braak and the surrounding buildings. For these reasons and to ensure the preservation of the harmonious appearance of this area the facades of these buildings facing the Braak have been proclaimed.	Stellenbosch	Stellenbosch	Provincial Heritage Site	33°56′10″S 18°51′18″E	The Divisional Council Offices and the Drostdy Hotel stand just above the so-called Coachman’s Cottage. The former is a comparatively recent building, while the Drostdy Hotel is older and has its own history. Although it might be difficult to justify the proclamation of these buildings on strictly historical grounds, they have considerable architectural merit and are of such a character that they fit in well with the Braak and the surrounding buildings. For these reasons and to ensure the preservation of the harmonious appearance of this area the facades of these buildings facing the Braak have been proclaimed. Media related to 46 Alexander Street, Stellenbosch at Wikimedia Commons
9/2/084/0071	First Gymnasium, 120 Dorp Street, Stellenbosch	Just a short distance higher up from La Gratitude on the left side of Dorp Street, stands a modest little building with a peculiar verandah. It looks rather out of place among the rest of the buildings by which it is squeezed in. This is the Stellenbosch Gymnasium from which the Paul Roos Gymnasium and the University of Stellenbosch developed.	Stellenbosch	Stellenbosch	Provincial Heritage Site	33°56′23″S 18°51′23″E	Just a short distance higher up from La Gratitude on the left side of Dorp Street, stands a modest little building with a peculiar verandah. It looks rather out of place among the rest of the buildings by which it is squeezed in. This is the Stellenbosch Gymnasium from which the Paul Roos Gymnasium and the University of Stellenbosch developed. Media related to First Gymnasium, Stellenbosch at Wikimedia Commons
9/2/084/0072	Old Rhenish School Hostel, 3 Blom Street, Stellenbosch	On the western side of the Braak, not far from the well-known little Rhenish Church, stands the Rhenish Hostel, the oldest girls' boarding school in our country. Apart from the historical significance of the building, its interesting architectural style imparts a special character to the Braak as an early 19th-century town square. Together with the Rhenish Church, the Burgher House, the St. Mary’s Church, the Coachman’s House, Laetitia and other buildings, the square forms a unique architectural complex.	Stellenbosch	Stellenbosch	Provincial Heritage Site	33°55′48″S 18°40′45″E	On the western side of the Braak, not far from the well-known little Rhenish Church, stands the Rhenish Hostel, the oldest girls' boarding school in our country. Apart from the historical significance of the building, its interesting architectural style imparts a special character to the Braak as an early 19th-century town square. Together with the Rhenish Church, the Burgher House, the St. Mary’s Church, the Coachman’s House, Laetitia and other buildings, the square forms a unique architectural complex. Media related to Old Rhenish School Hostel, Stellenbosch at Wikimedia Commons
9/2/084/0073	Saxenhof, 159 Dorp Street, Stellenbosch	The double-storeyed house, Saxenhof, was formerly also known as Neethling House. The land on which this house stands was granted to Pieter Andriesz Saxe already in 1704. He owned the place for sixteen years and it is accepted that it was he who built the original H-shaped Cape Dutch house. In 1889 the house was sold to Dr. Johannes Henoch Neethling, who shortly after converted the old single-storeyed house into a charming Georgian type double-storeyed house. The original and beautiful old ceilings as well as a few side and back windows of the old house were kept intact.	Stellenbosch	Stellenbosch	Provincial Heritage Site	33°56′20″S 18°51′45″E	The double-storeyed house, Saxenhof, was formerly also known as Neethling House. The land on which this house stands was granted to Pieter Andriesz Saxe already in 1704. He owned the place for sixteen years and it is accepted that it was he who built the original H-shaped Cape Dutch house. In 1889 the house was sold to Dr. Johannes Henoch Neethling, who shortly after converted the old single-storeyed house into a charming Georgian type double-storeyed house. The original and beautiful old ceilings as well as a few side and back windows of the old house were kept intact. Media related to Saxenhof at Wikimedia Commons
9/2/084/0074	Hauptfleisch House, 153 Dorp Street, Stellenbosch	Just as the three single-storeyed semi-detached houses at Nos. 153, 155 and 157 are still linked together, the various families who occupied them throughout the years were often also linked.	Stellenbosch	Stellenbosch	Provincial Heritage Site	33°56′20″S 18°51′43″E	Just as the three single-storeyed semi-detached houses at Nos. 153, 155 and 157 are still linked together, the various families who occupied them throughout the years were often also linked. Media related to Hauptfleisch House at Wikimedia Commons
9/2/084/0075	Vredelus and Klein Vredelus, 63 Dorp Street, Stellenbosch	This old house possesses a special kind of charm and mysteriousness, because it stands concealed behind a white wall and an extensive garden with lofty oak-trees, luxuriant shrubs, lawns and flowers. The houses are good examples of the architecture in Stellenbosch between the 18th and 19th centuries and are also of historical interest. They have been restored by Historic Houses Limited and lend a particular character to the town of Stellenbosch.	Stellenbosch	Stellenbosch	Provincial Heritage Site	33°56′25″S 18°51′18″E	This old house possesses a special kind of charm and mysteriousness, because it stands concealed behind a white wall and an extensive garden with lofty oak-trees, luxuriant shrubs, lawns and flowers. The houses are good examples of the architecture in Stellenbosch between the 18th and 19th centuries and are also of historical interest. They have been restored by Historic Houses Limited and lend a particular character to the town of Stellenbosch. Media related to Vredelus and Klein Vredelus at Wikimedia Commons
9/2/084/0076	Loubscher House, 157 Dorp Street, Stellenbosch	Just as the three single-storeyed semi-detached houses at Nos. 153, 155 and 157 are still linked together, the various families who occupied them throughout the years were often also linked. Nos. 155 and 157 with their modest gables are also architecturally important. No. 157 Dorp Street is indeed one of the few houses with a roundel motif on the pilasters on either side of the gable-window.	Stellenbosch	Stellenbosch	Provincial Heritage Site	33°56′19″S 18°51′44″E	Just as the three single-storeyed semi-detached houses at Nos. 153, 155 and 157 are still linked together, the various families who occupied them throughout the years were often also linked. Nos. 155 and 157 with their modest gables are also architecturally important. No. 157 Dorp Street is indeed one of the few houses with a roundel motif on the pilasters on either side of the gable-window. Media related to Loubscher House at Wikimedia Commons
9/2/084/0077	Ou Bakhuis, 152 and 154 Dorp Street, Stellenbosch		Stellenbosch	Stellenbosch	Provincial Heritage Site	33°56′19″S 18°51′44″E	Media related to 152–154 Dorp Street, Stellenbosch at Wikimedia Commons
9/2/084/0078	Libertas Parva, Dorp Street, Stellenbosch	A short distance from the railway station at the corner which Dorp Street forms with Somerset West Road, stands the first remarkable old house in this street. It is called Libertas Parva or Little Libertas and it is on the right side of the street (now Rembrandt van Rijn Art Centre). The oldest feature of the house is its four side gables; they are of the holbol type, but show a breaking up of the concaves and convexes into wavy lines reminiscent of a similar tendency in the front gables of the Zevenrivieren-Hazendal type, c, 1790. The house may therefore date from 1783 or soon after. Philip Jacob Haupt purchased the farm in 1819 and it must be accepted that he was responsible for the erection of the present front gable, with almost straight outlines, with the two front doors built in and also for the Georgian windows. Their outer surrounding pilasters are continued upward to form the outer gable pilasters. The Libertas Parva building complex is a fine example of the Stellenbosch architecture in the 18th and 19th centuries and lends a particular character to that part of the village. As the home of well-known Stellenbosch families it is also of great historic value.	Stellenbosch	Stellenbosch	Provincial Heritage Site	33°56′23″S 18°51′23″E	A short distance from the railway station at the corner which Dorp Street forms with Somerset West Road, stands the first remarkable old house in this street. It is called Libertas Parva or Little Libertas and it is on the right side of the street (now Rembrandt van Rijn Art Centre). The oldest feature of the house is its four side gables; they are of the holbol type, but show a breaking up of the concaves and convexes into wavy lines reminiscent of a similar tendency in the front gables of the Zevenrivieren-Hazendal type, c, 1790. The house may therefore date from 1783 or soon after. Philip Jacob Haupt purchased the farm in 1819 and it must be accepted that he was responsible for the erection of the present front gable, with almost straight outlines, with the two front doors built in and also for the Georgian windows. Their outer surrounding pilasters are continued upward to form the outer gable pilasters. The Libertas Parva building complex is a fine example of the Stellenbosch architecture in the 18th and 19th centuries and lends a particular character to that part of the village. As the home of well-known Stellenbosch families it is also of great historic value. Media related to Libertas Parva at Wikimedia Commons
9/2/084/0079	Diaconies Remise, 156 Dorp Street, Stellenbosch	No. 156 Dorp Street bears the venerable name of Diaconies Remise and it was purchased by Historical Homes of South Africa Ltd. on account of its historical and architectural value. The style of architecture indicates that it was built in the first decade of the 19th century. The house is also one of the very few with an authentic arched gateway next to the main building. This gate gives access from the street to the back-yard.	Stellenbosch	Stellenbosch	Provincial Heritage Site	33°56′19″S 18°51′39″E	No. 156 Dorp Street bears the venerable name of Diaconies Remise and it was purchased by Historical Homes of South Africa Ltd. on account of its historical and architectural value. The style of architecture indicates that it was built in the first decade of the 19th century. The house is also one of the very few with an authentic arched gateway next to the main building. This gate gives access from the street to the back-yard. Media related to Diaconies Remise at Wikimedia Commons
9/2/084/0080	Laetitia Building, 44 Alexander Street, Stellenbosch	Just above the so-called Coachman’s Cottage stands Laetitia, a double-storeyed, flat-roofed house which overlooks the Braak. In 1968 Laetitia was restored by Historical Homes of South Africa Ltd. Being representative of a specific style of architecture and situated in a prominent position at the north-western corner of the Braak, it enhances the importance and charm of this unique square at Stellenbosch.	Stellenbosch	Stellenbosch	Provincial Heritage Site	33°56′08″S 18°51′29″E	Just above the so-called Coachman’s Cottage stands Laetitia, a double-storeyed, flat-roofed house which overlooks the Braak. In 1968 Laetitia was restored by Historical Homes of South Africa Ltd. Being representative of a specific style of architecture and situated in a prominent position at the north-western corner of the Braak, it enhances the importance and charm of this unique square at Stellenbosch. Media related to Laetitia, Stellenbosch at Wikimedia Commons
9/2/084/0081	158 Dorp Street, Stellenbosch		Stellenbosch	Stellenbosch	Provincial Heritage Site	33°56′19″S 18°51′40″E	Media related to 158 Dorp Street, Stellenbosch at Wikimedia Commons
9/2/084/0082	Old Evangelical Lutheran Church, Dorp Street, Stellenbosch	This building in the Neo-Gothic style was designed and erected by Carl Otto Hager. It was originally used as a Lutheran Church after its consecration on 28 November 1854.	Stellenbosch	Stellenbosch	Provincial Heritage Site	33°56′23″S 18°51′23″E	This building in the Neo-Gothic style was designed and erected by Carl Otto Hager. It was originally used as a Lutheran Church after its consecration on 28 November 1854. Media related to Old Evangelical Lutheran Church, Stellenbosch at Wikimedia Commons
9/2/084/0083	Old Main Building, University of Stellenbosch, Ryneveld Street, Stellenbosch	This building was erected between 1880 and 1886 to provide proper housing for the Stellenbosch College. This so-called Main Building is in the Neo-Classical style, Carl Hager being the architect, and played an important part in the history of the Victoria College and later the University of Stellenbosch.	Stellenbosch	Stellenbosch	Provincial Heritage Site	33°55′53″S 18°51′43″E	This building was erected between 1880 and 1886 to provide proper housing for the Stellenbosch College. This so-called Main Building is in the Neo-Classical style, Carl Hager being the architect, and played an important part in the history of the Victoria College and later the University of Stellenbosch. Media related to Old Main Building, University of Stellenbosch at Wikimedia Commons
9/2/084/0084	Entrance and gates, Seminary, 171 Dorp Street, Stellenbosch	The gateway and gates which were erected at about 1769 as part of the Drostdy at that time, are situated on the most historic site in Stellenbosch. This site has associations with Simon van der Stel and the respective Drostdy buildings were formerly also situated here until, in 1859, they became the seat of the Theological Seminary.	Stellenbosch	Stellenbosch	Provincial Heritage Site	33°56′19″S 18°51′50″E	The gateway and gates which were erected at about 1769 as part of the Drostdy at that time, are situated on the most historic site in Stellenbosch. This site has associations with Simon van der Stel and the respective Drostdy buildings were formerly also situated here until, in 1859, they became the seat of the Theological Seminary. Media related to Theological Seminary, Stellenbosch at Wikimedia Commons
9/2/084/0085	37, 39 and 41 Herte Street, Stellenbosch	These historic double-storeyed houses were erected in about 1841 as residences for Coloured people and freed slaves and their descendants.	Stellenbosch	Stellenbosch	Provincial Heritage Site	33°56′15″S 18°51′20″E	These historic double-storeyed houses were erected in about 1841 as residences for Coloured people and freed slaves and their descendants. Media related to Slavenhuis, Stellenbosch at Wikimedia Commons
9/2/084/0086	48 and 50 Dorp Street, Stellenbosch	This imposing architectural complex consists of a Cape Dutch house which was erected in about 1815 and a double-storeyed annex which dates back to about 1960. The property is closely associated with two well-known Stellenbosch families, i.e. the Neethlings and Ackermanns.	Stellenbosch	Stellenbosch	Provincial Heritage Site	33°56′23″S 18°51′14″E	This imposing architectural complex consists of a Cape Dutch house which was erected in about 1815 and a double-storeyed annex which dates back to about 1960. The property is closely associated with two well-known Stellenbosch families, i.e. the Neethlings and Ackermanns. Media related to Ackermann House, Stellenbosch at Wikimedia Commons
9/2/084/0090	Transvalia, 127 Dorp Street, Stellenbosch	These double-storeyed buildings, in the predominantly Georgian style, probably all date from the beginning of the 19th century. This group of houses forms an almost perfect unit and also forms an important element in the street scene of the historic Dorp Street.	Stellenbosch	Stellenbosch	Provincial Heritage Site	33°56′20″S 18°51′32″E	These double-storeyed buildings, in the predominantly Georgian style, probably all date from the beginning of the 19th century. This group of houses forms an almost perfect unit and also forms an important element in the street scene of the historic Dorp Street. Media related to Transvalia, Stellenbosch at Wikimedia Commons
9/2/084/0091	Alma, 129 Dorp Street, Stellenbosch	These double-storeyed buildings, in the predominantly Georgian style, probably all date from the beginning of the 19th century. This group of houses forms an almost perfect unit and also forms an important element in the street scene of the historic Dorp Street.	Stellenbosch	Stellenbosch	Provincial Heritage Site	33°56′20″S 18°51′39″E	These double-storeyed buildings, in the predominantly Georgian style, probably all date from the beginning of the 19th century. This group of houses forms an almost perfect unit and also forms an important element in the street scene of the historic Dorp Street. Media related to Alma, Stellenbosch at Wikimedia Commons
9/2/084/0092	Bosman House, 133 Dorp Street, Stellenbosch	These double-storeyed buildings, in the predominantly Georgian style, probably all date from the beginning of the 19th century. This group of houses forms an almost perfect unit and also forms an important element in the street scene of the historic Dorp Street.	Stellenbosch	Stellenbosch	Provincial Heritage Site	33°56′20″S 18°51′39″E	These double-storeyed buildings, in the predominantly Georgian style, probably all date from the beginning of the 19th century. This group of houses forms an almost perfect unit and also forms an important element in the street scene of the historic Dorp Street. Media related to Bosman House, Stellenbosch at Wikimedia Commons
9/2/084/0093	Tinetta House, 135 Dorp Street, Stellenbosch	These double-storeyed buildings, in the predominantly Georgian style, probably all date from the beginning of the 19th century. This group of houses forms an almost perfect unit and also forms an important element in the street scene of the historic Dorp Street.	Stellenbosch	Stellenbosch	Provincial Heritage Site	33°56′20″S 18°51′39″E	These double-storeyed buildings, in the predominantly Georgian style, probably all date from the beginning of the 19th century. This group of houses forms an almost perfect unit and also forms an important element in the street scene of the historic Dorp Street. Media related to Tinetta House at Wikimedia Commons
9/2/084/0094	8 Herte Street, Stellenbosch	These properties were granted in 1750 to the landdrost and Heemrade, and to Jan Greyling. The complex of buildings is of special architectural interest and forms an essential part of the historic core of Stellenbosch.	Stellenbosch	Stellenbosch	Provincial Heritage Site	33°56′21″S 18°51′22″E	These properties were granted in 1750 to the landdrost and Heemrade, and to Jan Greyling. The complex of buildings is of special architectural interest and forms an essential part of the historic core of Stellenbosch. Media related to 8 Herte Street, Stellenbosch at Wikimedia Commons
9/2/084/0095	15 Herte Street, Stellenbosch	These properties were granted in 1750 to the landdrost and Heemrade, and to Jan Greyling. The complex of buildings is of special architectural interest and forms an essential part of the historic core of Stellenbosch.	Stellenbosch	Stellenbosch	Provincial Heritage Site	33°56′20″S 18°51′21″E	These properties were granted in 1750 to the landdrost and Heemrade, and to Jan Greyling. The complex of buildings is of special architectural interest and forms an essential part of the historic core of Stellenbosch. Media related to 15 Herte Street, Stellenbosch at Wikimedia Commons
9/2/084/0096	19 Herte Street, Stellenbosch	These properties were granted in 1750 to the landdrost and Heemrade, and to Jan Greyling. The complex of buildings is of special architectural interest and forms an essential part of the historic core of Stellenbosch.	Stellenbosch	Stellenbosch	Provincial Heritage Site	33°56′18″S 18°51′21″E	These properties were granted in 1750 to the landdrost and Heemrade, and to Jan Greyling. The complex of buildings is of special architectural interest and forms an essential part of the historic core of Stellenbosch. Media related to 19 Herte Street, Stellenbosch at Wikimedia Commons
9/2/084/0097	21 Herte Street, Stellenbosch	These properties were granted in 1750 to the landdrost and Heemrade, and to Jan Greyling. The complex of buildings is of special architectural interest and forms an essential part of the historic core of Stellenbosch.	Stellenbosch	Stellenbosch	Provincial Heritage Site	33°56′17″S 18°51′21″E	These properties were granted in 1750 to the landdrost and Heemrade, and to Jan Greyling. The complex of buildings is of special architectural interest and forms an essential part of the historic core of Stellenbosch. Media related to 21 Herte Street, Stellenbosch at Wikimedia Commons
9/2/084/0098	23 Herte Street, Stellenbosch	These properties were granted in 1750 to the landdrost and Heemrade, and to Jan Greyling. The complex of buildings is of special architectural interest and forms an essential part of the historic core of Stellenbosch.	Stellenbosch	Stellenbosch	Provincial Heritage Site	33°56′17″S 18°51′21″E	These properties were granted in 1750 to the landdrost and Heemrade, and to Jan Greyling. The complex of buildings is of special architectural interest and forms an essential part of the historic core of Stellenbosch. Media related to 23 Herte Street, Stellenbosch at Wikimedia Commons
9/2/084/0099	Dutch Reformed Mother Church, Drostdy Street, Stellenbosch	A portion of this building originally formed part of the Stellenbosch cruciform church which was erected between 1719 and 1723. In 1862 the church was enlarged and altered in the neo-Gothic style by the architect Carl Otto Hager. The church was consecrated on 31 October 1863.	Stellenbosch	Stellenbosch	Provincial Heritage Site	33°56′16″S 18°51′49″E	A portion of this building originally formed part of the Stellenbosch cruciform church which was erected between 1719 and 1723. In 1862 the church was enlarged and altered in the neo-Gothic style by the architect Carl Otto Hager. The church was consecrated on 31 October 1863. Media related to Dutch Reformed Mother Church, Stellenbosch at Wikimedia Commons
9/2/084/0100	Utopia, 1 Drostdy Street, Stellenbosch	This imposing H-shaped Cape Dutch house was built at the end of the 18th century for Philip Hartog.	Stellenbosch	Stellenbosch	Provincial Heritage Site	33°56′16″S 18°51′49″E	This imposing H-shaped Cape Dutch house was built at the end of the 18th century for Philip Hartog. Media related to Utopia, Stellenbosch at Wikimedia Commons
9/2/084/0102	Wilgenhof, Ryneveld Street, Stellenbosch	The original portion of the historic Bachelors building was erected between 1786 and 1799. The building was later altered into a double-storeyed Georgian house and it was taken into use in 1903 as a boarding establishment for students. It is the oldest portion of the oldest university residence of Stellenbosch and many well-known personalities in the public life of South Africa lodged here during their student years.	Stellenbosch	Stellenbosch	Provincial Heritage Site	33°55′55″S 18°51′43″E	The original portion of the historic Bachelors building was erected between 1786 and 1799. The building was later altered into a double-storeyed Georgian house and it was taken into use in 1903 as a boarding establishment for students. It is the oldest portion of the oldest university residence of Stellenbosch and many well-known personalities in the public life of South Africa lodged here during their student years. Media related to Wilgenhof at Wikimedia Commons
9/2/084/0103	105 Dorp Street, Stellenbosch	This historic dwelling-house is a typical double-storeyed town house of the second half of the 19th century. The property forms an essential part of the traditional architectural street scene of Dorp Street, and thus also of the historic core of Stellenbosch.	Stellenbosch	Stellenbosch	Provincial Heritage Site	33°56′22″S 18°51′31″E	This historic dwelling-house is a typical double-storeyed town house of the second half of the 19th century. The property forms an essential part of the traditional architectural street scene of Dorp Street, and thus also of the historic core of Stellenbosch. Media related to 105 Dorp Street, Stellenbosch at Wikimedia Commons
9/2/084/0104	Voorgelegen, 116 and 118 Dorp Street, Stellenbosch	This property originally formed part of De Nieuwe Molen, which was granted to the Landdros and Heemrade in 1750. In 1797 it became the property of Johannes Victor, who almost immediately erected the original H-shaped Cape Dutch house. In the second half of the 19th century the building was converted to a Georgian double-storey residence. Together with the outbuildings and the garden ring-wall it forms an outstanding group of buildings from the point of view of architecture and town planning and constitutes an integral part of the street scene of Dorp Street and the historic core of Stellenbosch. The old-world garden with its tranquil atmosphere which is partly due to the mill-stream, is an aesthetic gem which fits in with the unique group of properties surrounding Voorgelegen.	Stellenbosch	Stellenbosch	Provincial Heritage Site	33°56′21″S 18°51′30″E	This property originally formed part of De Nieuwe Molen, which was granted to the Landdros and Heemrade in 1750. In 1797 it became the property of Johannes Victor, who almost immediately erected the original H-shaped Cape Dutch house. In the second half of the 19th century the building was converted to a Georgian double-storey residence. Together with the outbuildings and the garden ring-wall it forms an outstanding group of buildings from the point of view of architecture and town planning and constitutes an integral part of the street scene of Dorp Street and the historic core of Stellenbosch. The old-world garden with its tranquil atmosphere which is partly due to the mill-stream, is an aesthetic gem which fits in with the unique group of properties surrounding Voorgelegen. Media related to Voorgelegen at Wikimedia Commons
9/2/084/0105	51 Dorp Street, Stellenbosch	This Victorianised house, which was originally erected during the first half of the 19th century, together with seven similar structures, forms one of the most impressive street scenes in Stellenbosch.	Stellenbosch	Stellenbosch	Provincial Heritage Site	33°56′25″S 18°51′16″E	This Victorianised house, which was originally erected during the first half of the 19th century, together with seven similar structures, forms one of the most impressive street scenes in Stellenbosch.
9/2/084/0106	Bergh House, 11 Drostdy Street, Stellenbosch	The original portion of this building dates from the middle of the 18th century. It is now a typical example of a double-storeyed town house. The best known owner of the property was Prof. John Murray, one of the first two professors at the Theological Seminary.	Stellenbosch	Stellenbosch	Provincial Heritage Site	33°56′15″S 18°51′48″E	The original portion of this building dates from the middle of the 18th century. It is now a typical example of a double-storeyed town house. The best known owner of the property was Prof. John Murray, one of the first two professors at the Theological Seminary. Media related to Bergh House at Wikimedia Commons
9/2/084/0107	110 Dorp Street, Stellenbosch	The original part of this double-storeyed town house dates from the beginning of the 19th century. The building was later adapted to the Georgian style. The property forms an essential part of the traditional architectural street scene of Dorp Street, and thus also of the historic core of Stellenbosch.	Stellenbosch	Stellenbosch	Provincial Heritage Site	33°56′20″S 18°51′26″E	The original part of this double-storeyed town house dates from the beginning of the 19th century. The building was later adapted to the Georgian style. The property forms an essential part of the traditional architectural street scene of Dorp Street, and thus also of the historic core of Stellenbosch. Media related to 110 Dorp Street, Stellenbosch at Wikimedia Commons
9/2/084/0108	108 Dorp Street, Stellenbosch	The original part of this historic house dates from the beginning of the 19th century and was later adapted to the Georgian style. It forms an integral part of the architecturally and historically important street scene of Dorp Street.	Stellenbosch	Stellenbosch	Provincial Heritage Site	33°56′21″S 18°51′26″E	The original part of this historic house dates from the beginning of the 19th century and was later adapted to the Georgian style. It forms an integral part of the architecturally and historically important street scene of Dorp Street. Media related to 108 Dorp Street, Stellenbosch at Wikimedia Commons
9/2/084/0109	112 Dorp Street, Stellenbosch	This historic house dates from approximately 1798 and was later converted to the Georgian style. It forms an integral part of the architecturally and historically important street scene of Dorp Street.	Stellenbosch	Stellenbosch	Provincial Heritage Site	33°56′21″S 18°51′28″E	This historic house dates from approximately 1798 and was later converted to the Georgian style. It forms an integral part of the architecturally and historically important street scene of Dorp Street. Media related to Merweda, Stellenbosch at Wikimedia Commons
9/2/084/0110	31 Van Riebeeck Street, Stellenbosch	This predominantly Victorian house dates from the beginning of the 20th century. Owing to the property's strategic position it forms an important aspect of the townscape.	Stellenbosch	Stellenbosch	Provincial Heritage Site	33°56′12″S 18°52′06″E	This predominantly Victorian house dates from the beginning of the 20th century. Owing to the property's strategic position it forms an important aspect of the townscape. Media related to 31 Van Riebeeck Street, Stellenbosch at Wikimedia Commons
9/2/084/0111	Oude Werf, 30 Church Street, Stellenbosch	This property initially formed the boundary of the original Stellenbosch cemetery which fell into disuse in 1710. In 1783 the plot came into the ownership of J. B. Hoffman, who was presumably responsible for the erection of the original Cape Dutch house. This building was thereafter used as a boarding-house for many decades. By 1889 an additional storey had been added, which gave the building its present imposing Georgian appearance.	Stellenbosch	Stellenbosch	Provincial Heritage Site	33°56′17″S 18°51′42″E	This property initially formed the boundary of the original Stellenbosch cemetery which fell into disuse in 1710. In 1783 the plot came into the ownership of J. B. Hoffman, who was presumably responsible for the erection of the original Cape Dutch house. This building was thereafter used as a boarding-house for many decades. By 1889 an additional storey had been added, which gave the building its present imposing Georgian appearance. Media related to Oude Werf, Stellenbosch at Wikimedia Commons
9/2/084/0112	149 Dorp Street, Stellenbosch	This house displays a harmonious mixture of Cape Dutch and Georgian characteristics. The oldest portion presumably dates from the beginning of the 18th century. The property forms an essential architectural and aesthetic keystone in the historic core of Stellenbosch.	Stellenbosch	Stellenbosch	Provincial Heritage Site	33°56′20″S 18°51′43″E	This house displays a harmonious mixture of Cape Dutch and Georgian characteristics. The oldest portion presumably dates from the beginning of the 18th century. The property forms an essential architectural and aesthetic keystone in the historic core of Stellenbosch. Media related to 149 Dorp Street, Stellenbosch at Wikimedia Commons
9/2/084/0113	141 and 143 Dorp Street, Stellenbosch	The original portions of this Cape Dutch house date from the middle of the 18th century and it was first used as parsonage for the Rev. Meent Borcherds. The property forms an essential part of the traditional architectural street scene of Dorp Street, and thus also of the historic core of Stellenbosch.	Stellenbosch	Stellenbosch	Provincial Heritage Site	33°56′20″S 18°51′40″E	The original portions of this Cape Dutch house date from the middle of the 18th century and it was first used as parsonage for the Rev. Meent Borcherds. The property forms an essential part of the traditional architectural street scene of Dorp Street, and thus also of the historic core of Stellenbosch. Media related to Oude Pastorie, Stellenbosch at Wikimedia Commons
9/2/084/0114	Van Niekerk House, 47 Church Street, Stellenbosch	This double-storeyed Victorian house is situated on a plot which was granted to Landdrost C. Linnes as early as 1694. The building is closely associated with the historic core of Stellenbosch.	Stellenbosch	Stellenbosch	Provincial Heritage Site	33°56′17″S 18°51′43″E	This double-storeyed Victorian house is situated on a plot which was granted to Landdrost C. Linnes as early as 1694. The building is closely associated with the historic core of Stellenbosch. Media related to Van Niekerk House, Stellenbosch at Wikimedia Commons
9/2/084/0115	Crozier House, 11 Victoria Street, Stellenbosch	The facade of this late 19th-century building has notable Victorian and Georgian characteristics. The Crozier House earlier formed part of the old College Square of the Victoria College.	Stellenbosch	Stellenbosch	Provincial Heritage Site	33°56′05″S 18°51′41″E	The facade of this late 19th-century building has notable Victorian and Georgian characteristics. The Crozier House earlier formed part of the old College Square of the Victoria College. Media related to Crozier House at Wikimedia Commons
9/2/084/0116	25–35 Herte Street, Stellenbosch	This row of semi-detached cottages with their pointed gables was presumably erected during the middle of the 19th century as accommodation for freed slaves. These properties form an essential part of the historic and architectural character of Herte Street and also of the historic core of Stellenbosch.	Stellenbosch	Stellenbosch	Provincial Heritage Site	33°56′17″S 18°51′20″E	This row of semi-detached cottages with their pointed gables was presumably erected during the middle of the 19th century as accommodation for freed slaves. These properties form an essential part of the historic and architectural character of Herte Street and also of the historic core of Stellenbosch. Media related to 25–35 Herte Street, Stellenbosch at Wikimedia Commons
9/2/084/0117	126 Dorp Street, Stellenbosch		Stellenbosch	Stellenbosch	Provincial Heritage Site	33°56′20″S 18°51′32″E	Media related to 126 Dorp Street, Stellenbosch at Wikimedia Commons
9/2/084/0119	Hofmeyr Hall, 39 Church Street, Stellenbosch	This neo-classical hall, with its impressive Ionic temple facade, was inaugurated in October 1900. The building was constructed for use by the Christelijke Jongelieden Vereniging, and was named after Prof. N. J. Hofmeyr, founder of the Stellenbosch Seminary and the CJV.	Stellenbosch	Stellenbosch	Provincial Heritage Site	33°56′16″S 18°51′44″E	This neo-classical hall, with its impressive Ionic temple facade, was inaugurated in October 1900. The building was constructed for use by the Christelijke Jongelieden Vereniging, and was named after Prof. N. J. Hofmeyr, founder of the Stellenbosch Seminary and the CJV. Media related to Hofmeyr Hall, Stellenbosch at Wikimedia Commons
9/2/084/0120	Old Conservatory, 10 Van Riebeeck Street, Stellenbosch	The South African Conservatorium of Music, the first conservatory in South Africa, was established in 1905, with Prof. F. W. Jannasch as Director. This double-storey building is built in an interesting mixture of architectural styles.	Stellenbosch	Stellenbosch	Provincial Heritage Site	33°56′12″S 18°51′55″E	The South African Conservatorium of Music, the first conservatory in South Africa, was established in 1905, with Prof. F. W. Jannasch as Director. This double-storey building is built in an interesting mixture of architectural styles. Media related to Old Conservatory, Stellenbosch at Wikimedia Commons
9/2/084/0122	Theological Seminary, 171 Dorp Street, Stellenbosch	The original Drostdy was the first public building in Stellenbosch and was a U-shaped building which was completely rebuilt, in 1763. It was then given an H-shape and the front of a traditional Cape Dutch farmhouse. It served as Drostdy until 1827. In 1859 the building was donated to the D.R. Church and the Theological Seminary was opened there. The building forms an integral part of the historic character of Dorp Street as well as of the historic core of Stellenbosch.	Stellenbosch	Stellenbosch	Provincial Heritage Site	33°56′19″S 18°51′51″E	The original Drostdy was the first public building in Stellenbosch and was a U-shaped building which was completely rebuilt, in 1763. It was then given an H-shape and the front of a traditional Cape Dutch farmhouse. It served as Drostdy until 1827. In 1859 the building was donated to the D.R. Church and the Theological Seminary was opened there. The building forms an integral part of the historic character of Dorp Street as well as of the historic core of Stellenbosch.
9/2/084/0123	45 Dorp Street, Stellenbosch	This property originally formed part of the farm Vredenlust which was granted to Christoffel Henske in 1781. This cottage is one of a row of six similar semi-detached buildings which were erected between 1817and 1859 in the Cape Dutch style and which were later Victorianised.	Stellenbosch	Stellenbosch	Provincial Heritage Site	33°56′25″S 18°51′15″E	This property originally formed part of the farm Vredenlust which was granted to Christoffel Henske in 1781. This cottage is one of a row of six similar semi-detached buildings which were erected between 1817and 1859 in the Cape Dutch style and which were later Victorianised.
9/2/084/0124	1 Victoria Street, Stellenbosch	These three Victorianised semi-detached cottages were originally erected early in the 19th century. The cottages form an important architectural unit and lend character to the nearby College Square.	Stellenbosch	Stellenbosch	Provincial Heritage Site	33°56′05″S 18°51′39″E	These three Victorianised semi-detached cottages were originally erected early in the 19th century. The cottages form an important architectural unit and lend character to the nearby College Square. Media related to 1 Victoria Street, Stellenbosch at Wikimedia Commons
9/2/084/0125	62–66 Andringa Street, Stellenbosch		Stellenbosch	Stellenbosch	Provincial Heritage Site	33°56′05″S 18°51′39″E	Media related to 62–66 Andringa Street, Stellenbosch at Wikimedia Commons
9/2/084/0126	Skuinshuis Jewish complex, 44 Ryneveld Street, Stellenbosch	The core of this double-storeyed building dates from about 1782. The facade of the house was rebuilt during the first half of the 19th century. The building, together with the historic chicken-coop, forms a unique architectural complex.	Stellenbosch	Stellenbosch	Provincial Heritage Site	33°56′09″S 18°51′46″E	The core of this double-storeyed building dates from about 1782. The facade of the house was rebuilt during the first half of the 19th century. The building, together with the historic chicken-coop, forms a unique architectural complex. Media related to Skuinshuis, Stellenbosch at Wikimedia Commons
9/2/084/0127	20 Crozier Street, Stellenbosch	This Victorian cottage forms part of a row of five semi-detached cottages that date from the late 19th century.	Stellenbosch	Stellenbosch	Provincial Heritage Site	33°55′59″S 18°51′39″E	This Victorian cottage forms part of a row of five semi-detached cottages that date from the late 19th century.
9/2/084/0128	16 Crozier Street, Stellenbosch	This Victorian cottage forms part of a row of five semi-detached cottages that date from the late 19th century.	Stellenbosch	Stellenbosch	Provincial Heritage Site	33°55′59″S 18°51′38″E	This Victorian cottage forms part of a row of five semi-detached cottages that date from the late 19th century. Media related to 16 Crozier Street, Stellenbosch at Wikimedia Commons
9/2/084/0129	De Eiken, 25 Market Street, Stellenbosch	This house was occupied from 1854 to 1898 by Carl Otto Hager, well-known church architect, photographer and painter.	Stellenbosch	Stellenbosch	Provincial Heritage Site	33°56′19″S 18°51′18″E	This house was occupied from 1854 to 1898 by Carl Otto Hager, well-known church architect, photographer and painter. Media related to De Eiken at Wikimedia Commons
9/2/084/0131	14 Van Riebeeck Street, Stellenbosch	This late-Victorian house, with its exquisite cast-iron latticed veranda, dates from the 1890s. The property forms an important element in the townscape in view of its strategic position.	Stellenbosch	Stellenbosch	Provincial Heritage Site	33°56′12″S 18°51′57″E	This late-Victorian house, with its exquisite cast-iron latticed veranda, dates from the 1890s. The property forms an important element in the townscape in view of its strategic position. Media related to 14 Van Riebeeck Street, Stellenbosch at Wikimedia Commons
9/2/084/0132	Old C L Marais Library, Crozier Street, Stellenbosch	Thanks to a generous donation from a benefactor of Stellenbosch, Mr CL Marais, contributions from the Stellenbosch Distriksbank and the Colonial Government, the erection of a library building on the northern side of College Square was started in 1900 and completed in 1901. The new building was named after Mr CL Marais and was the first building in the history of the University which was built for this specific purpose. It did, however, also house the administrative offices of the Victoria College for approximately 20 years and some rooms in the building were used as Council Chambers and Senate committee rooms.	Stellenbosch	Stellenbosch	Provincial Heritage Site	33°56′00″S 18°51′38″E	Thanks to a generous donation from a benefactor of Stellenbosch, Mr CL Marais, contributions from the Stellenbosch Distriksbank and the Colonial Government, the erection of a library building on the northern side of College Square was started in 1900 and completed in 1901. The new building was named after Mr CL Marais and was the first building in the history of the University which was built for this specific purpose. It did, however, also house the administrative offices of the Victoria College for approximately 20 years and some rooms in the building were used as Council Chambers and Senate committee rooms. Media related to CL Marais Library at Wikimedia Commons
9/2/084/0133	Bergville, 13–15 Victoria Street, Stellenbosch	This predominantly Victorian building consists of two double-storeyed semi-detached houses which form an attractive architectural unit with a joint cornice and parapet wall. The building dates from the late 19th or early 20th century.	Stellenbosch	Stellenbosch	Provincial Heritage Site	33°56′18″S 18°51′48″E	This predominantly Victorian building consists of two double-storeyed semi-detached houses which form an attractive architectural unit with a joint cornice and parapet wall. The building dates from the late 19th or early 20th century. Media related to Bergville at Wikimedia Commons
9/2/084/0134	Red House, 68 Kahler Street, Idas Valley, Stellenbosch	This impressive dwelling-house with its true Victorian features dates from the 19th century and is allegedly one of the oldest houses in the old Coloured area of ldasvallei.	Stellenbosch, Idas Valley	Stellenbosch	Provincial Heritage Site	33°55′14″S 18°53′00″E	This impressive dwelling-house with its true Victorian features dates from the 19th century and is allegedly one of the oldest houses in the old Coloured area of ldasvallei. Media related to Red House, Stellenbosch at Wikimedia Commons
9/2/084/0135	Thaba 'Nchu, 5 Rattray Avenue, Stellenbosch	Thaba 'Nchu is a single storeyed semi-detached house in the high Victorian style, which was built in 1900 by James Rattray, the grandson of a British teacher brought over from England by Lord Charles Somerset. Thaba 'Nchu is not only a typical example of late Victorian houses erected in Stellenbosch at the turn of the century, but is also the only one of its kind which has been restored to its authentic colour scheme, an important feature being the simulated brick pattern of the outside walls. The walls are plastered with a raised narrow moulding applied in the first instance in a brickwork design and then painted black. From a distance the black lines against the ochre coloured plaster gives the impression that the wall is constructed of brick. The rustication is accentuated by white paint. The stoep is covered by a candy-striped curved corrugated-iron verandah, supported on cast-iron pillars which are decorated with delicate flower-and-leaves tracery. The section of the wall above the verandah and below the eaves has been painted white with black etchings, giving it a Tudor look. The large, gracefully curved, wooden end-gable was completely re-fashioned during restoration.	Stellenbosch	Stellenbosch	Provincial Heritage Site	33°56′17″S 18°52′02″E	Thaba 'Nchu is a single storeyed semi-detached house in the high Victorian style, which was built in 1900 by James Rattray, the grandson of a British teacher brought over from England by Lord Charles Somerset. Thaba 'Nchu is not only a typical example of late Victorian houses erected in Stellenbosch at the turn of the century, but is also the only one of its kind which has been restored to its authentic colour scheme, an important feature being the simulated brick pattern of the outside walls. The walls are plastered with a raised narrow moulding applied in the first instance in a brickwork design and then painted black. From a distance the black lines against the ochre coloured plaster gives the impression that the wall is constructed of brick. The rustication is accentuated by white paint. The stoep is covered by a candy-striped curved corrugated-iron verandah, supported on cast-iron pillars which are decorated with delicate flower-and-leaves tracery. The section of the wall above the verandah and below the eaves has been painted white with black etchings, giving it a Tudor look. The large, gracefully curved, wooden end-gable was completely re-fashioned during restoration. Media related to 5 Rattray Avenue, Stellenbosch at Wikimedia Commons
9/2/084/0136	41 Dorp Street, Stellenbosch	These two Victorianised houses, which were originally erected during the first half of the 19th century, together with six other similar buildings, form one of the most charming and harmonious street scenes in Stellenbosch.	Stellenbosch	Stellenbosch	Provincial Heritage Site	33°56′25″S 18°51′14″E	These two Victorianised houses, which were originally erected during the first half of the 19th century, together with six other similar buildings, form one of the most charming and harmonious street scenes in Stellenbosch.
9/2/084/0137	49 Dorp Street, Stellenbosch	These two semi-detached cottages form part of a row of eight similar semi-detached cottages that were erected between 1817 and 1859 in the Cape Dutch style and that were later Victorianised. The cottages form an important visual element of the historical character of Dorp Street in Stellenbosch.	Stellenbosch	Stellenbosch	Provincial Heritage Site	33°56′25″S 18°51′15″E	These two semi-detached cottages form part of a row of eight similar semi-detached cottages that were erected between 1817 and 1859 in the Cape Dutch style and that were later Victorianised. The cottages form an important visual element of the historical character of Dorp Street in Stellenbosch.
9/2/084/0138	Caledon Villa, 7 Neethling Street, Stellenbosch	This impressive dwelling-house with its Edwardian and Victorian characteristics was erected in 1910 by the Rev. J. G. J. Krige of Caledon as a retirement home.	Stellenbosch	Stellenbosch	Provincial Heritage Site	33°56′15″S 18°51′57″E	This impressive dwelling-house with its Edwardian and Victorian characteristics was erected in 1910 by the Rev. J. G. J. Krige of Caledon as a retirement home. Media related to Caledon Villa at Wikimedia Commons
9/2/084/0139	4 Neethling Street, Stellenbosch	This dwelling with its curved verandah and cast-iron decorations is one of two identical late-Victorian semi-detached houses that form an integral part of the architectural street scene of Neethling Street, as well as of the historical core of Stellenbosch.	Stellenbosch	Stellenbosch	Provincial Heritage Site	33°56′17″S 18°52′00″E	This dwelling with its curved verandah and cast-iron decorations is one of two identical late-Victorian semi-detached houses that form an integral part of the architectural street scene of Neethling Street, as well as of the historical core of Stellenbosch. Media related to 4 Neethling Street, Stellenbosch at Wikimedia Commons
9/2/084/0140	Nietgevonden, Stellenbosch District		Stellenbosch	Stellenbosch	National Monument	33°54′08″S 18°50′32″E	Upload Photo
9/2/084/0142	26–30 Andringa Street, Stellenbosch		Stellenbosch	Stellenbosch	Provincial Heritage Site	33°56′10″S 18°51′39″E	Media related to 26–30 Andringa Street, Stellenbosch at Wikimedia Commons
9/2/084/0143	162 Dorp Street, Stellenbosch		Stellenbosch	Stellenbosch	Provincial Heritage Site	33°56′18″S 18°51′48″E	Media related to 162 Dorp Street, Stellenbosch at Wikimedia Commons
9/2/084/0144	13 Herte Street, Stellenbosch		Stellenbosch	Stellenbosch	Provincial Heritage Site	33°56′20″S 18°51′21″E	Media related to 13 Herte Street, Stellenbosch at Wikimedia Commons
9/2/084/0145	19 Herold Street, Stellenbosch		Stellenbosch	Stellenbosch	Provincial Heritage Site	33°56′18″S 18°51′07″E	Media related to 19 Herold Street, Stellenbosch at Wikimedia Commons
9/2/084/0146	Old Labourers' Cottages, Aan-de-Wagen Road, Stellenbosch	These farm-hands' cottages date from the year 1902 and were probably designed by Sir Herbert Baker, the architect.	Stellenbosch	Stellenbosch	Provincial Heritage Site	33°57′15″S 18°51′20″E	These farm-hands' cottages date from the year 1902 and were probably designed by Sir Herbert Baker, the architect. Media related to Old Labourers' Cottages, Stellenbosch at Wikimedia Commons
9/2/084/0147	Old Bloemhof Girls' Primary School, 52 Ryneveld Street, Stellenbosch	The building of the Bloemhof Girls' Primary School, which was opened on 2 June 1907, is an outstanding example of the eclectic style of building of the late 19th and early 20th centuries. Together with other historic buildings in Ryneveld Street it forms a unique historical and architectural group.	Stellenbosch	Stellenbosch	Provincial Heritage Site	33°56′08″S 18°51′46″E	The building of the Bloemhof Girls' Primary School, which was opened on 2 June 1907, is an outstanding example of the eclectic style of building of the late 19th and early 20th centuries. Together with other historic buildings in Ryneveld Street it forms a unique historical and architectural group. Media related to Old Bloemhof Girls' Primary School, Stellenbosch at Wikimedia Commons
9/2/084/0148	37 Dorp Street, Stellenbosch	These two Victorianised houses, which were originally erected during the first half of the 19th century, together with six other similar buildings, form one of the most charming and harmonious street scenes in Stellenbosch.	Stellenbosch	Stellenbosch	Provincial Heritage Site	33°56′25″S 18°51′13″E	These two Victorianised houses, which were originally erected during the first half of the 19th century, together with six other similar buildings, form one of the most charming and harmonious street scenes in Stellenbosch.
9/2/084/0149	39 Dorp Street, Stellenbosch	These two Victorianised houses, which were originally erected during the first half of the 19th century, together with six other similar buildings, form one of the most charming and harmonious street scenes in Stellenbosch.	Stellenbosch	Stellenbosch	Provincial Heritage Site	33°56′25″S 18°51′13″E	These two Victorianised houses, which were originally erected during the first half of the 19th century, together with six other similar buildings, form one of the most charming and harmonious street scenes in Stellenbosch.
9/2/084/0150	18 Crozier Street, Stellenbosch		Stellenbosch	Stellenbosch	Provincial Heritage Site	33°55′59″S 18°51′38″E	
9/2/084/0151	22, 24 and 26 Crozier Street, Stellenbosch		Stellenbosch	Stellenbosch	Provincial Heritage Site	33°56′00″S 18°51′39″E	Media related to 18–26 Crozier Street, Stellenbosch at Wikimedia Commons
9/2/084/0153	Coopman House, 33 Church Street, Stellenbosch	This historic dwelling-house is a typical Georgian double-storeyed town house of the mid-18th century. The property forms an essential part of the traditional architectural street scene of Church Street, and therefore also of the historic core of Stellenbosch.	Stellenbosch	Stellenbosch	Provincial Heritage Site	33°56′17″S 18°51′43″E	This historic dwelling-house is a typical Georgian double-storeyed town house of the mid-18th century. The property forms an essential part of the traditional architectural street scene of Church Street, and therefore also of the historic core of Stellenbosch. Media related to Coopman House, Stellenbosch at Wikimedia Commons
9/2/084/0154	Ryneveldhof, Stellenbosch		Stellenbosch	Stellenbosch	Provincial Heritage Site	33°55′55″S 18°51′43″E	Media related to Ryneveldhof at Wikimedia Commons
9/2/084/0154/001	89 Banhoek Road, Stellenbosch	Part of Ryneveldhof (corner of Banhoek and Ryneveld Streets)	Stellenbosch	Stellenbosch	Provincial Heritage Site	33°55′48″S 18°51′56″E	Part of Ryneveldhof (corner of Banhoek and Ryneveld Streets)
9/2/084/0154/002	91 Banhoek Road, Stellenbosch	Part of Ryneveldhof (corner of Banhoek and Ryneveld Streets)	Stellenbosch	Stellenbosch	Provincial Heritage Site	33°55′48″S 18°51′56″E	Part of Ryneveldhof (corner of Banhoek and Ryneveld Streets)
9/2/084/0154/003	93 Banhoek Road, Stellenbosch	Part of Ryneveldhof (corner of Banhoek and Ryneveld Streets)	Stellenbosch	Stellenbosch	Provincial Heritage Site	33°55′48″S 18°51′56″E	Part of Ryneveldhof (corner of Banhoek and Ryneveld Streets)
9/2/084/0154/004	83 Ryneveld Street, Stellenbosch	Part of Ryneveldhof	Stellenbosch	Stellenbosch	Provincial Heritage Site	33°56′00″S 18°51′44″E	Part of Ryneveldhof
9/2/084/0154/005	81 Ryneveld Street, Stellenbosch	Part of Ryneveldhof	Stellenbosch	Stellenbosch	Provincial Heritage Site	33°56′00″S 18°51′44″E	Part of Ryneveldhof
9/2/084/0154/006	79 Ryneveld Street, Stellenbosch	Part of Ryneveldhof	Stellenbosch	Stellenbosch	Provincial Heritage Site	33°56′00″S 18°51′44″E	Part of Ryneveldhof
9/2/084/0154/007	77 Ryneveld Street, Stellenbosch	Part of Ryneveldhof	Stellenbosch	Stellenbosch	Provincial Heritage Site	33°56′00″S 18°51′44″E	Part of Ryneveldhof
9/2/084/0154/008	75 Ryneveld Street, Stellenbosch	Part of Ryneveldhof	Stellenbosch	Stellenbosch	Provincial Heritage Site	33°56′00″S 18°51′44″E	Part of Ryneveldhof
9/2/084/0154/009	73 Ryneveld Street, Stellenbosch	Part of Ryneveldhof	Stellenbosch	Stellenbosch	Provincial Heritage Site	33°56′00″S 18°51′44″E	Part of Ryneveldhof Media related to Ryneveldhof at Wikimedia Commons
9/2/084/0154/010	71 Ryneveld Street, Stellenbosch		Stellenbosch	Stellenbosch	Provincial Heritage Site	33°56′00″S 18°51′44″E	
9/2/084/0154/011	69 Ryneveld Street, Stellenbosch		Stellenbosch	Stellenbosch	Provincial Heritage Site	33°56′00″S 18°51′44″E	Media related to 69–71 Ryneveld Street, Stellenbosch at Wikimedia Commons
9/2/084/0155	5 Ryneveld Street, Stellenbosch		Stellenbosch	Stellenbosch	National Monument	33°56′17″S 18°51′47″E	Upload Photo
9/2/084/0156	Cloetesdal, Cloetesville, Stellenbosch		Stellenbosch	Stellenbosch		33°43′46″S 18°59′20″E	Upload Photo
9/2/084/0157	Spier, Stellenbosch District		Stellenbosch	Stellenbosch		33°58′56″S 18°47′11″E	Upload Photo
9/2/084/0158	Morkel House, 4–6 Ryneveld Street, Stellenbosch	Morkel House, the second last house on the eastern side of Ryneveld Street before its intersection with Dorp Street, is one of the oldest building structures in South Africa. For this reason it is of great importance both historically and architecturally.	Stellenbosch	Stellenbosch	Provincial Heritage Site	33°56′17″S 18°51′47″E	Morkel House, the second last house on the eastern side of Ryneveld Street before its intersection with Dorp Street, is one of the oldest building structures in South Africa. For this reason it is of great importance both historically and architecturally. Media related to Morkel House at Wikimedia Commons
9/2/084/0159	Compagnies Drift, Meerlust, Stellenbosch District		Stellenbosch	Stellenbosch	National Monument		Upload Photo
9/2/084/0160	Dagbreek Hostel, Victoria Street, Stellenbosch		Stellenbosch	Stellenbosch	Pending Declaration	33°55′58″S 18°52′09″E	Upload Photo
9/2/084/0161	Morgenhof, Stellenbosch District		Stellenbosch	Stellenbosch	Pending Register	33°53′38″S 18°51′39″E	Upload Photo
9/2/084/0163	Oude Molen complex, Stellenbosch		Stellenbosch	Stellenbosch	National Monument	33°56′23″S 18°50′51″E	Upload Photo
9/2/084/0164	Nyasa House, 13 Van Riebeeck Street, Stellenbosch		Stellenbosch	Stellenbosch		33°56′13″S 18°51′57″E	Upload Photo
9/2/084/0165	Rozenhof, 8-18 Dorp Street, Stellenbosch		Stellenbosch	Stellenbosch		33°56′26″S 18°51′00″E	Upload Photo
9/2/084/0166	STELLENBOSCH MAGISTERIAL DISTRICT, GENERAL		Stellenbosch	Stellenbosch			Upload Photo
9/2/084/0167	Scholtzenhof, Stellenbosch District		Stellenbosch	Stellenbosch		34°01′33″S 18°49′09″E	Upload Photo
9/2/084/0168	6 Neethling Street, Stellenbosch		Stellenbosch	Stellenbosch		33°56′17″S 18°52′00″E	Upload Photo
9/2/084/0169	Uitkyk, Stellenbosch District		Stellenbosch	Stellenbosch		33°51′24″S 18°51′51″E	Upload Photo
9/2/084/0170	Bonfoi, Stellenbosch District		Stellenbosch	Stellenbosch		33°56′30″S 18°46′32″E	Upload Photo
9/2/084/0172	67 Ryneveld Street, Stellenbosch		Stellenbosch	Stellenbosch	National Monument	33°56′07″S 18°51′46″E	Upload Photo
9/2/084/0173	12 Neethling Street, Stellenbosch		Stellenbosch	Stellenbosch	National Monument	33°56′15″S 18°51′59″E	Upload Photo
9/2/084/0175	Rhenish Primary School, 5 Bloem Street, Stellenbosch		Stellenbosch	Stellenbosch		33°56′48″S 18°51′20″E	Upload Photo
9/2/084/0176	Graves, Farm Welmoed, Stellenbosch District		Stellenbosch	Stellenbosch	National Monument	33°59′26″S 18°45′59″E	Upload Photo
9/2/084/0177	Groene Rivier Annexure B (Groenvlei), Farm 570, Stellenbosch District		Stellenbosch	Stellenbosch			Upload Photo
9/2/084/0178	47 Dorp Street, Stellenbosch District		Stellenbosch	Stellenbosch		33°56′25″S 18°51′15″E	Upload Photo
9/2/084/0179	Welgevallen Archaeological Site, Stellenbosch District		Stellenbosch	Stellenbosch			Upload Photo
9/2/084/0180	Koloniesland, Stellenbosch		Stellenbosch	Stellenbosch			Upload Photo

== Heritage sites near Stellenbosch town ==
SAHRA identifier	Site name	Description	Town	District	NHRA status	Coordinates	Image
9/2/084/0002	Idas Valley, Cape Winelands Cultural Landscape	The CWCL is significant because of its idyllic setting, rich history associated with living heritage and distinctive cultural and natural environment; and unique planned landscapes boasting an architectural and aesthetic form unique to South Africa. Of great importance is, it is a site of significance in relating to the history of slavery in South Africa. Idas Valley is a typical and, at the same time, a special example of this cultural landscape type. It is particularly unspoilt in the context of the Cape Winelands generally.		Stellenbosch	National Heritage Site	33°52′59″S 18°56′14″E	The CWCL is significant because of its idyllic setting, rich history associated with living heritage and distinctive cultural and natural environment; and unique planned landscapes boasting an architectural and aesthetic form unique to South Africa. Of great importance is, it is a site of significance in relating to the history of slavery in South Africa. Idas Valley is a typical and, at the same time, a special example of this cultural landscape type. It is particularly unspoilt in the context of the Cape Winelands generally. Media related to Idas Valley CWCL at Wikimedia Commons
9/2/084/0002/001	Kelsey Farm, Idas Valley, Stellenbosch District			Stellenbosch	Provincial Heritage Site	33°54′52″S 18°54′03″E	Upload Photo
9/2/084/0002/002	Wedge Farm, Idas Valley, Stellenbosch District			Stellenbosch	Provincial Heritage Site	33°55′00″S 18°54′14″E	Upload Photo
9/2/084/0002/003	Ida Minor, Idas Valley, Stellenbosch District			Stellenbosch	Provincial Heritage Site	33°54′52″S 18°53′58″E	Upload Photo
9/2/084/0002/004	Hymettus Farm, Idas Valley, Stellenbosch District			Stellenbosch	Provincial Heritage Site	33°55′02″S 18°52′26″E	Upload Photo
9/2/084/0002/005	Idas Valley Homestead, Idas Valley, Stellenbosch District			Stellenbosch	Provincial Heritage Site	33°55′22″S 18°53′14″E	Media related to Idas Valley Homestead at Wikimedia Commons
9/2/084/0002/006	Heather Hill, Idas Valley, Stellenbosch District			Stellenbosch	Provincial Heritage Site	33°54′55″S 18°53′53″E	Upload Photo
9/2/084/0002/007	Glenbawn, Idas Valley, Stellenbosch District			Stellenbosch	Provincial Heritage Site	33°55′21″S 18°53′08″E	Upload Photo
9/2/084/0002/008	High Rustenburg, Idas Valley, Stellenbosch District			Stellenbosch	Provincial Heritage Site	33°55′19″S 18°53′09″E	Upload Photo
9/2/084/0002/009	Rustenburg, Idas Valley, Stellenbosch District			Stellenbosch	Provincial Heritage Site	33°55′22″S 18°53′08″E	Upload Photo
9/2/084/0002/010	Schoongezicht, Idas Valley, Stellenbosch District			Stellenbosch	Provincial Heritage Site	33°55′20″S 18°53′11″E	
9/2/084/0002/011	Heather Cottage, Idas Valley, Stellenbosch District			Stellenbosch	Provincial Heritage Site	33°55′21″S 18°53′03″E	Upload Photo
9/2/084/0002/012	Volksrust, Idas Valley, Stellenbosch District	The first farm in Idas Valley was granted in 1683 to François Villon, a French Huguenot. Important historical figures, like J. X. Merriman and Sir Thomas Smartt, also owned farms in the Valley. On several farms, specifically Rustenburg, Schoongezicht, Idas Valley and Glenbawn, there are Cape Dutch houses and wine cellars of considerable architectural importance. The Valley also has a unique rustic character and natural beauty, and is, in its entirety, of exceptional national importance.		Stellenbosch	Provincial Heritage Site	33°55′22″S 18°53′11″E	Upload Photo
9/2/084/0002/013	Entabeni, Idas Valley, Stellenbosch District			Stellenbosch	Provincial Heritage Site	33°55′21″S 18°53′16″E	Upload Photo
9/2/084/0002/014	Old Orchard, Idas Valley, Stellenbosch District			Stellenbosch	Provincial Heritage Site	33°55′21″S 18°53′10″E	Upload Photo
9/2/084/0002/015	Wedge Corner, Idas Valley, Stellenbosch District			Stellenbosch	Provincial Heritage Site	33°55′21″S 18°53′10″E	Upload Photo
9/2/084/0002/016	Simonsberg, Idas Valley, Stellenbosch District			Stellenbosch	Provincial Heritage Site	33°55′25″S 18°53′10″E	Upload Photo
9/2/084/0002/017	Cranford, Idas Valley, Stellenbosch District			Stellenbosch	Provincial Heritage Site	33°55′20″S 18°53′15″E	Upload Photo
9/2/084/0002/018	Wedgewood Farm, Idas Valley, Stellenbosch District			Stellenbosch	Provincial Heritage Site	33°55′22″S 18°53′12″E	Upload Photo
9/2/084/0002/019	Wedgewood, Idas Valley, Stellenbosch District			Stellenbosch	Provincial Heritage Site	33°55′24″S 18°53′16″E	Upload Photo
9/2/084/0002/020	Part of Heather Hill, Idas Valley, Stellenbosch District			Stellenbosch	Provincial Heritage Site	33°55′25″S 18°52′49″E	Upload Photo
9/2/084/0002/021	Part of Idas Valley, Idas Valley, Stellenbosch District			Stellenbosch	Provincial Heritage Site	33°55′20″S 18°53′09″E	Upload Photo
9/2/084/0006	Bellevue, Stellenbosch District	The property with the historic homestead of the Bellevue Estate thereon, known as the farm Houd den Mond.		Stellenbosch	Provincial Heritage Site	33°59′01″S 18°50′09″E	Upload Photo
9/2/084/0008	Elsenburg, Stellenbosch District	The historical farmyard, including the historical buildings and structures thereon, situated on a portion of the farm Elsenburg.		Stellenbosch	Provincial Heritage Site	33°56′02″S 18°51′48″E	The historical farmyard, including the historical buildings and structures thereon, situated on a portion of the farm Elsenburg. Media related to Elsenburg, Stellenbosch at Wikimedia Commons
9/2/084/0020	Rust en Vrede, Annandale Road, Stellenbosch	The historic house and wine cellar of the Rust en Vrede wine estate.		Stellenbosch	Provincial Heritage Site	33°59′51″S 18°51′08″E	The historic house and wine cellar of the Rust en Vrede wine estate. Media related to Rust en Vrede, Stellenbosch at Wikimedia Commons
9/2/084/0022/001	Klein Gustrouw, Jonkershoek, Stellenbosch District	Originally owned by a free slave, Louis van Bengallen to whom it was granted in 1683. When he died in 1696, it passed to the estate of Anthony of Angola.		Stellenbosch	Provincial Heritage Site	33°57′20″S 19°00′36″E	Upload Photo
9/2/084/0022/002	Leef op Hoop, Jonkershoek, Stellenbosch District	This impressive H-shaped dwelling-house dates from the beginning of the 19th century. It has Georgian and Victorian features and is unique in that both the original farm and dwelling are divided in two.		Stellenbosch	Provincial Heritage Site	33°55′57″S 19°00′48″E	Upload Photo
9/2/084/0025	Old Nectar, Farm Glenconnor, Jonkershoek, Stellenbosch District	Old Nectar is architecturally one of the finest and best-known gabled houses of the old Cape type. The front of this house is one of the most striking in the Western Cape, an outstanding example of the late neo-classical type of gable. The impressive appearance of the gable is due to the perfect proportions of the elevation as well as the unique design of the gable itself. The gable occupies precisely one-third of the narrow facade, a circumstance which gives it height and prominence. The balance is preserved by a full-width and a half-width window on each side of the door and a full-width dormer window above it. The front stable door and fanlight together with the sash windows, small panes and wooden shutters, all form a harmonious whole. The gable derives its particular character from four pilasters which rise without interruption from the stoep, the vase on each of the pilasters and the triangular pediment. The monotony of the plain plastered spaces between the pilasters is broken by festoons.		Stellenbosch	Provincial Heritage Site	33°54′18″S 19°00′18″E	Upload Photo
9/2/084/0026	Fleurbaix Farmstead, Stellenbosch District	This farm was granted in 1695 to a Huguenot, Pierre le Fèbre, who was a surgeon by profession. Named after the town of Fleurbaix in Picardie, the farm was over 44 morgen in size. The house is said to date from 1768; the end-gables and the front gable were added in 1800, during the ownership of Paul Roux. The plan of the house, points to it having grown in stages. The house is H-shaped, but a wall (in which there is an 18c wall-cupboard flanked by doors) separates the voorhuis (which is deeper than the adjoining rooms) from the agterkamer. This is usual in a house that was once T-shaped. There is a flat-roofed addition to the right-hand back wing. The front gable is of a transitional type, with holbol characteristics as well as a small pediment; the end-gables also have pediments, with unusual undulating outlines. There is no back gable, which supports the theory that the front and end-gables are later additions. Most original ceilings and many doors survive, but the external woodwork is 19th century. The thatch had been replaced by corrugated iron with raised eaves level. Flanking the house, and in line with it, are outbuildings with iron roofs and plain holbol end-gables.		Stellenbosch	Provincial Heritage Site	33°54′48″S 18°45′39″E	Upload Photo
9/2/084/0032	Neethlingshof, Stellenbosch District	This property was originally granted to Barend Lubbe in 1699. The present H-shaped gabled house with its impressive facade was erected in 1814 by Charles Marais.		Stellenbosch	Provincial Heritage Site	33°56′15″S 18°51′58″E	This property was originally granted to Barend Lubbe in 1699. The present H-shaped gabled house with its impressive facade was erected in 1814 by Charles Marais. Media related to Neethlingshof at Wikimedia Commons
9/2/084/0033	Nooitgedacht, Stellenbosch District	About nine km from Stellenbosch along the road to Koelenhof a farm road turns off sharply to the right, crosses a bridge and enters a white-washed gateway heavily shadowed by oaks. Behind these trees stands the fine old house of Nooitgedacht. The house was built in 1774, and is an outstanding example of Cape Dutch architecture. Together with the slave bell and the outbuildings which include the wine cellar, it forms a remarkable architectural complex. The farm is also of special importance in the history of pomology in the Western Province.		Stellenbosch	Provincial Heritage Site	33°57′06″S 18°51′51″E	Upload Photo
9/2/084/0087	Uiterwyk, Stellenbosch District	This property was granted in 1699 to Dirk Coetzee. In 1791 Johannes Krige enlarged the existing house and added gables. This Cape Dutch house is at present H-shaped, with an impressive concavo-convex front gable.		Stellenbosch	Provincial Heritage Site	33°55′50″S 18°53′08″E	Upload Photo
9/2/084/0088	Koopmanskloof, Stellenbosch District	This Cape Dutch house was erected in 1801 by Petrus Johannes Bosman. The unusual double T-shaped ground plan, the stepped gables on the sides and the authentic Malay plaster-work are of particular architectural interest.		Stellenbosch	Provincial Heritage Site	33°54′02″S 18°46′14″E	This Cape Dutch house was erected in 1801 by Petrus Johannes Bosman. The unusual double T-shaped ground plan, the stepped gables on the sides and the authentic Malay plaster-work are of particular architectural interest.
9/2/084/0089	Vredenburg, Stellenbosch District	The farm Vredenburg was granted to Hendrik Elbertz in 1691. The historic dwelling thereon was built by a later owner, Jacob Roux, in 1789.		Stellenbosch	Provincial Heritage Site	33°57′40″S 18°48′25″E	The farm Vredenburg was granted to Hendrik Elbertz in 1691. The historic dwelling thereon was built by a later owner, Jacob Roux, in 1789.
9/2/084/0101	Weltevreden, Stellenbosch District	The property known as the Weltevreden farm, including all the historical buildings thereon. This H-shaped Cape Dutch dwelling-house has six elaborately finished gables. The front gable bears the date 1812. The wine-cellar was built in approximately 1804 and, together with the farm house and outbuildings, forms an important architectural complex.		Stellenbosch	Provincial Heritage Site	33°53′57″S 18°50′52″E	The property known as the Weltevreden farm, including all the historical buildings thereon. This H-shaped Cape Dutch dwelling-house has six elaborately finished gables. The front gable bears the date 1812. The wine-cellar was built in approximately 1804 and, together with the farm house and outbuildings, forms an important architectural complex.
9/2/084/0118	Libertas, Stellenbosch District	Home of Adam Tas. Originally granted to Jan Cornelisz, it was purchased by Jurgen Grimpen a German. Grimpen's widow married Adam Tas and hence the Tas connection. Adam Tas procured the farm in 1702 and lived here until his death in 1722. Especially noteworthy of this Cape Dutch building complex, is the H-shaped main dwelling-house with its frescos by Jan Adam Hoffman (This is incorrect. The frescos were in fact painted by the artist/schoolteacher Jan Adam Hartman who was in the employ of the well-to-do Hoffman family -ref. http://www.stellenboschwriters.com/hmlibertas.html) in 1779.		Stellenbosch	Provincial Heritage Site	33°55′55″S 18°51′42″E	Home of Adam Tas. Originally granted to Jan Cornelisz, it was purchased by Jurgen Grimpen a German. Grimpen's widow married Adam Tas and hence the Tas connection. Adam Tas procured the farm in 1702 and lived here until his death in 1722. Especially noteworthy of this Cape Dutch building complex, is the H-shaped main dwelling-house with its frescos by Jan Adam Hoffman (This is incorrect. The frescos were in fact painted by the artist/schoolteacher Jan Adam Hartman who was in the employ of the well-to-do Hoffman family -ref. http://www.stellenboschwriters.com/hmlibertas.html) in 1779. Media related to Libertas, Stellenbosch at Wikimedia Commons
9/2/084/0130	Champagne, Stellenbosch District	The farm Dwars-in-den-Weg, now known as Champagne, was granted to Jacob de Wilde in 1697. The Cape Dutch dwelling-house was presumably erected in 1793 by Isaac Stephanus de Villiers. The house is T-shaped it has been thoroughly modernized, internally as well as externally. But it retains a most interesting gable of the transitional period, with outline mouldings reminiscent of the holbol gables but with short pilasters on its face and a pediment (cf. those of Eenzaamheid and Welmoed).		Stellenbosch	Provincial Heritage Site	33°58′23″S 18°51′12″E	Upload Photo
9/2/084/0140-001	Lime kiln, Nietgevonden, Stellenbosch District	This unique lime kiln was presumably erected by Hermanus Johannes van Brakel shortly after the subdivision of the farm Rustenburg in 1790 of which Nietgegund (now known as Stellenkloof) also originally formed part. It is the only structure of its kind in the Stellenbosch district.		Stellenbosch	Provincial Heritage Site	33°55′54″S 18°51′51″E	Upload Photo
9/2/084/0141	By-Den-Weg, Stellenbosch District			Stellenbosch	Provincial Heritage Site	33°56′34″S 18°47′16″E	Upload Photo
9/2/084/0162	Trout hatchery, Assegaaibosch, Jonkershoek, Stellenbosch District			Stellenbosch	Provincial Heritage Site	33°55′40″S 19°00′38″E	Media related to Trout hatchery, Assegaaibosch at Wikimedia Commons
9/2/084/0171	Meerlust, Stellenbosch District	One of the first farmers to be granted land beyond the confines of the Cape Peninsula in about 1680, was Henning Husing, a large-scale cattle farmer who for many years enjoyed the monopoly of supplying meat to the Dutch East India Company. His farm, which he called Meerlust, was situated on the Eerste River, a short distance north of where Faure is today. Not only did it become one of the most important historical farms in the area, but the fine gabled house which was recently restored by the owner remains an outstanding example of Cape Dutch architecture.		Stellenbosch	Provincial Heritage Site	33°55′48″S 18°51′31″E	One of the first farmers to be granted land beyond the confines of the Cape Peninsula in about 1680, was Henning Husing, a large-scale cattle farmer who for many years enjoyed the monopoly of supplying meat to the Dutch East India Company. His farm, which he called Meerlust, was situated on the Eerste River, a short distance north of where Faure is today. Not only did it become one of the most important historical farms in the area, but the fine gabled house which was recently restored by the owner remains an outstanding example of Cape Dutch architecture. Media related to Meerlust, Stellenbosch at Wikimedia Commons
9/2/084/0171/001	Dovecot, Meerlust, Stellenbosch District	Such dovecots were typical features of many old Cape farms and they were carefully designed. In fact, just as much attention was given to their facades as to those of the main dwellings, which explains why they have considerable architectural and aesthetic merits. The one at Meerlust is one of the best preserved examples in the Western Province.		Stellenbosch	Provincial Heritage Site	33°55′40″S 18°53′03″E	Such dovecots were typical features of many old Cape farms and they were carefully designed. In fact, just as much attention was given to their facades as to those of the main dwellings, which explains why they have considerable architectural and aesthetic merits. The one at Meerlust is one of the best preserved examples in the Western Province. Media related to Dovecot, Meerlust at Wikimedia Commons

== See also ==
- Cape Dutch architecture
- Heritage Western Cape
- Stellenbosch Museum
