= Melodisc Records =

Record label founded by Emil E. Shalit in the 1940s

- Founded: 1949; 77 years ago
- Founder: Emil Shalit
- Status: Defunct
- Distributor: Decca
- Genre: Jazz, blues, folk, calypso, mento, ska, African, Indian
- Country of origin: UK

Melodisc Records was a record label founded by Emil E. Shalit in the late 1940s. It was one of the first independent record labels in the UK and the parent company of the Blue Beat label.

== History ==
Melodisc records was founded by Austrian-born American citizen Emil Edward Shalit (24 December 1909 – 23 April 1983) and his business partner Jack Chilkes. Melodisc began trading in London, England, in August 1949 and soon became established as one of the first—and, at the time, the largest—independent record labels in the UK. Its offices were in Earlham Street, Covent Garden.

The company was founded in 1949 when Shalit was still living in New York City, with the initial purpose of licensing American jazz for release in the UK. In London, Melodisc was managed by Jack Chilkes until a disagreement with Shalit led to his departure and a subsequent lawsuit in late 1952; According to Chilkes, Shalit had tricked him into believing that he owned the rights to material actually owned by other companies. In the early 1950s, Melodisc focused on licensing and releasing American jazz and folk records in the UK and had a production and distribution arrangement with Decca Records. After Chilkes was replaced by Trinidadian Rupert Nurse, who became Melodisc's musical director, the label also released rhythm and blues, West Indian, and African recordings. Calypso and mento music was also released to cater to the growing Afro-Caribbean community in Britain. Early Melodisc releases in the UK included 78 rpm and later 45 rpm records, EPs, and LPs by artists such as Big Bill Broonzy, Louis Jordan, Josh White, Woody Guthrie, Lead Belly, and Charlie Parker.

From the early 1950s, Melodisc started recording musicians in London, particularly at the Esquire studios in Bedford Court Mansions in Covent Garden. Early recordings were supervised by Denis Preston. Among the musicians recorded were Jamaican-born jazz musician Joe Harriott, pianist Russ Henderson, and the Trinidadians Lord Beginner and Lord Kitchener, whose song "Birth of Ghana" was recorded in London in late 1956. Melodisc was actively involved in exporting records from Britain to the emerging record-buying markets in West Africa and the Caribbean including Guyanese singer Terry Nelson (aka Halla Gala).

From the mid- to late 1950s, Melodisc sought out Jamaican-produced records to distribute in Britain and made deals with producers such as Coxsone Dodd, Prince Buster and Duke Reid. It released Laurel Aitken's "Lonesome Lover" in the UK in 1960. Following its success, Shalit employed Sigimund "Siggy" Jackson to set up a subsidiary label, Blue Beat, which focused on Jamaican blues and ska music. For several years, the label name became synonymous with Jamaican music in the UK and became associated with the mod and later skinhead sub-cultures of the 1960s and early 1970s.

In 1966, Melodisc set up a new sub-label, Fab Records, to release rocksteady music. The Melodisc label continued to release LPs through the 1960s and into the early 1970s. Artists included Prince Buster, Ambrose Campbell, Ginger Johnson, Ravi Shankar, and Lord Kitchener.

Emil Shalit died in Slough, England, in 1983, at the age of 73.

== Discography ==
=== Singles ===
Number	Artist	Titles	Notes
P201	Delia Murphy with the Kerry Band	"The Wake in Kildare" / "The Wild Colonial Boy"	
P202	Delia Murphy with the Kerry Band	"Connemara Cradle Song" / "A Trip Over the Mountain" (Mel89/Mel91)	
P203	Delia Murphy with the Kerry Band	"County Tyrone" / "The Captain with the Whiskers" (Mel88/Mel90)	
P204	Butlin's American Square Dancers - Danny Levan's Tennessee Rakers (Butlins Chief Caller Wally Goodman)	"Virginia Reel" / "Soldier's Joy" [Mel254/Mel252]	
P205	Butlin's American Square Dancers with Caller - Danny Levan's Tennessee Rakers	"Butlins Reel" / "Rakes of Mallow [Mel251/Mel253]	
P206	Tito Burns Sextet	"Over a Bottle of Wine" / "Undecided"	
P207	Jack Fallon's Red River Boys	"The Girl I Left Behind Me" / "Wagoners Reel" [Mel 290/Mel 291]	
P208	Jack Fallon's Red River Boys	"Duck for the Oyster" / "Plough Jockeys Ball"	
P209	Varsity String Orchestra (Ed Durlacher, caller)	"Nelly Bly" / "Red River Valley" [S 1696 /S 1694]	Featuring authentic American square dancers with calls
P210	Dickie Valentine with Chorus and Orchestra	"Lorelei" / "Never"	Directed by Maurice Taylor – (from the 1951 Mitzi Gaynor movie Golden Girl) [RRT1001] [1952] (Two Heath singers solo on Melodisc Ted Heath vocalists Dickie Valentine and Dennis Lotis both solo on Melodise records due to be released shortly. Melody Maker, 22 March 1952, vol. 28, issue 966, p. 8)
P211	Dennis Lotis with the Maurice Taylor Orchestra	"Tell Me Why" / "Please Mr. Sun" [/RRT1005]	
P212	Annette Klooger with the Teddy Foster Orchestra	"I Wanna Love You" / "I'm Lucky I Have You" [RRT1007/RRT 1008]	
P213	Frank Deniz, Hermanos Deniz' Cuban Rhythm Band	"Mambo No.5" / "Mi Botecito" [Mel 316/Mel 318]	
P214	Hermanos Deniz' Cuban Rhythm Band	"O Tic Tac Do Meu Coracao - Samba" / "Luna Lunera - Rhumba" [Mel 317/Mel 319]	
P215	Butlin's American Square Dancers, Danny Levan's Tennessee Rakers	"Ragtime Annie" /"Up Town Down Town" [Mel320]	
P216	Four Sensations	"Raindrops" / "When Honeymoon Lane Becomes Memory Lane"	
P217	Annette Klooger with Teddy Foster & His Orchestra	"Tell Me You Love Me" / Start Singing A Song	
P218	The Three Monarchs	"Cock-A-Hoop" / "Blow Blow Boogie" [DA2187/DA2188]	
P219	Little Diana Day and The St. Trinian Kids, Reg Tilsley Orchestra	"I'm Goin' To Hang Up Mummy's Stocking" / "Funny Little Snowman" [DA2207]	
P220	Archie Lewis, Bruce Campbell Orchestra	"Hold My Hand" / "I Still Believe" [DA2203 / DA2204]	
P221	Diana Day	"Susan And The Pixies" (Parts 1 & 2)	
P222	Archie Lewis	"Au Revoir" / "Silent Holy Night"	
P223	The Mack Triplets with Sonny Rossi & His Mambo Orchestra	"What's Next" / Sonny Rossi & His Mambo Orchestra, "Harlem Nocturne"	
P224	George Browne Band	"Hajji Baba" / "Mambo Sevilliano"	
P225	George Clarkson with The Melomaids	"Drigo's Serenade" / "Valse Brilliante"	
P226	Janet Gordon With Billy Reid Orchestra	"It's Such A Long Time" / "I Won't Tell My Momma"	
P227	Lucille Mapp, Jeff Mustin Orchestra	"I'll Be There" / "Yesterday"	
P228	The Four Ramblers	"I Dreamed About Tomorrow Last Night" / "The Wheels Of Love" [DA2316/DA2317]	Music directed by Jeff Mustin
P229	Lucille Mapp, Jeff Mustin Orchestra	"I Live Every Day" / "My Heart's Delight" [DA2314 /DA2315]	
P230	Johnny Franks Rhythm	"Shake, Rattle & Roll" /"Tweedle Dee"	
P231	Irene King and Harry Bolton, Syd Dean Orchestra	"Sunshine Bus" / "The Snake"	
P232	Johnny Franks & His Rhythm	"Two Hearts, Two Kisses" / "Fiddling Rhythm Blues"	
P233	The Four Ramblers	"The Spinning Wheel" / "A One-sided Love Affair"	
P234	The Honey Dreamers	"Irish Mambo" / "Five Minutes To Twelve"	
P235	Dorita y Pepe	"Babalu" / "Triana Morena"	
P236	Lenny Angelo with Jan Ralfini Orchestra	"Show Me The Way" / "Broken Hearted Shadow" [DA2368]	
P237	Merrick Farran Concert Orchestra with Julie Dawn (voc)	"Jeremy Make-Believe" / "The Telephone Waltz" [DA2394]	
P238	John Runge	"Farmer's Boy" / "Snuff Box Sue" / "Clucking Hen"	
P239	Dorita y Pepe	"Pobre/Tabu" [DA2349 /DA2348]	
P240	Jan Ralfini & His Orchestra	"Baby Girl Of Mine" / "Anywhere Is Heaven" [1956]	
8001	Bechet-Spanier Big Four	"China Boy" / "Four Or Five Times" [R2773/R2776] [Jazz Section JS 502; Hot Record Society HRS2001]	Sidney Bechet–sop sax Muggsy Spanier–clnt; Carmen Mastran–gtr; Wellman Bruad–bass
8002	Bechet-Spanier Big Four	"If I Could Be With You" / "That's A Plenty" [MELR2801 /MELR2802] [Jazz Selection JS 501; HRS2002]	
8003	Lester Young & Charlie Parker	"Blues for Norman pt 1 /pt 2" (Jazz at the Philharmonic series) (D241/D242) [DISC 2001]	Lester Young–tenor sax Charlie Parker, Willie Smith–alto saxes Howard McGhee, Al Killian–tpts; Arnold Ross–pno; Billy Hadnott–bass; Lee Young–dms
8004	Lester Young & Charlie Parker	"I Can't Get Started pt1/pt2" (Jazz at the Philharmonic series Vol. 2) (D243/D244) [DISC 2002]	
8005	Bechet-Spanier Big Four	"Sweet Lorraine" / "Lazy River" (MELR 2774/MELR2775) [Hot Record Society HRS2000; / Jazz Selection JS 501]	
8006	Bechet-Spanier Big Four	"Squeeze Me" / "Sweet Sue, Just You" (MELR2803/MELR2804) [Hot Record Society HRS2003]	
8007	Lester Young & Charlie Parker	"Oh, Lady Be Good! pt 1 /pt 2" (MELD245/MEL D246) (Jazz at the Philharmonic series) [DISC 2005]	
8008	Josh White	"Mean Mistreatin' Woman" / "Baby Baby" [MELD220/MELD222] [DISC 3004A/DISC 3005B]	
8009	Lester Young, John Birks, Charlie Ventura, Willie Smith, Shoeless Joe Jackson.	"Crazy Rhythm, Part 1" / "Crazy Rhythm, Part 2" (Jazz at the Philharmonic series Vol 3), [DISC 2003 (411/412)]	
8010	Lester Young & Charlie Parker	"Sweet Georgia Brown pt 1/pt 2" (Jazz at the Philharmonic series Vol 3) (D. 413/D.414) [DISC 2004] (Young, Birks, Ventura, Killian, Smith, Young, Hadnott, Jackson)	
8011	King Cole Quintette	"Heads" / "It Had To Be You" [Disc 2010 (1010/1012)]	Nat King Cole (piano, vocal); Shad Collins (trumpet); Illinois Jacquet (tenor saxophone); Gene Englund (bass); J. C. Heard (drums)
8012	King Cole Quintette	I Can't Give You Anything But Love" / "Pro-Sky" [D507 /] [Disc 2011 (1011/1013)]	
1001	Slim Gaillard and Bam Brown	Opera in Vout (Groove Juice Symphony) Introduzione Pianissimo (Softly, Most Softly) / Recitativo E Finale (of Much Scat) {Jazz at the Philharmonic Volume 4} {461/462} [DISC6022]	Slim Gaillard (guitar, piano, drums); Bam Brown, bass & vocal
1002	Slim Gaillard and Bam Brown	Opera in Vout (Groove Juice Symphony) Andante Contabile in Modo de Blues (C-Jam)/Presto con Stomp (With a Floy -Floy) {Jazz at the Philharmonic Volume 4} {463/464} [DISC6023]	
1003	Illinois Jacquet	Illinois Jacquet Blues (Part 1/2) (O333/O334) (Jazz at the Philharmonic vol. 4) {455/456} [DISC 6024]	Illinois Jacquet, Jack McVea (tenor sax); J.J. Johnson (trombone) "Shorty" Nadine (piano); Les Paul (guitar); Johnny Miller (bass); Lee Young (drums)
1004	Illinois Jacquet, Lester Young	Blues (pt 3) (Jacquet) / "Lester Leaps In (pt 1)" (Young) (O335/O336) (0335/0336) (Jazz at the Philharmonic vol 4) [D457/D458] [DISC 6025]	Illinois Jacquet, Jack McVea (tenor sax); J.J. Johnson (trombone); Shorty Nadine (piano); Johnny Miller (bass); Les Paul (guitar); Lester Young (drums)
1005	Lester Young	"Lester Leaps In (pt 2 /pt 3)" (O.337/O.338) [D459/D460] (Jazz at the Philharmonic vol. 4) [DISC 6026]	
1006	Meade Lux Lewis	"Fast Boogie" / "Medium Boogie" (O420/0421) [D266/D267] (Boogie Woogie at the Philharmonic Parts 1/2) [DISC 6020]	
1007	Meade Lux Lewis	"Slow Boogie" / "Honky Tonk Train Blues" [D268/D269] (Boogie Woogie at the Philharmonic Parts 3/4) [DISC 6021]	
1008	Illinois Jacquet, etc.	Rosetta (Part 1/2) [D720/D721] (Jazz at the Philharmonic vol. 5)	Illinois Jacquet, Jack McVea (tenor saxophones); Shorty Sherock (trumpet); Shorty Nadine (piano); Les Paul (guitar); Johnny Miller (bass); Lee Young (drums)
1009	Illinois Jacquet, etc.	"Body and Soul" (Part 1 /2) [D725/D726] [DISC 6028] (Jazz at the Philharmonic vol. 5)	Illinois Jacquet, Jack McVea (tenor sax); J.J. Johnson (trombone) "Shorty" Nadine (piano); Johnny Miller (bass); Lee Young (drums); Les Paul (guitar)
1010	Illinois Jacquet, etc.	"Body and Soul (Part 3/4)" [D727/D728] (Jazz at the Philharmonic, Vol. 5) [DISC 6029]	Illinois Jacquet, Jack McVea (tenor sax); J.J. Johnson (trombone) "Shorty" Nadine (piano); Johnny Miller (bass); Les Paul (guitar); Lee Young (drums)
1011	Illinois Jacquet, etc.	"How High The Moon (Part 1/2)" [4850/4851] (Jazz at the Philharmonic vol. 1) [ASCH 453-1]	Illinois Jacquet, Charlie Ventura (tenor sax); Joe Guy, Howard McGhee (trumpets); Willie Smith (alto sax); Garland Finney (piano); Ulysses Livingstone (guitar); Red Callender (bass)
1012	Illinois Jacquet, etc.	"How High The Moon (Part 3)" / "Lady Be Good (pt 1)" [4852/4853] (Jazz at the Philharmonic vol. 1) [ASCH 453-2/]	Personnel as 1011
1013	Illinois Jacquet etc.	"Lady Be Good (Part 2 /Part 3)" [4854/4855] (Jazz at the Philharmonic vol. 1)	Personnel as 1011 [ASCH 453-2/ASCH 453-3]
1014	Lester Young	"After You've Gone (Part 1/Part 2)" [D800/D801] (Jazz at the Philharmonic) [DISC 5100]	Al Killian & Howard McGhee (trumpet); Charlie Parker, Willie Smith (alto saxophone); Lester Young (tenor saxophone); Arnold Ross (piano); Billy Hadnott (bass) and Lee Young (drums)
1015	Enso Toppano	"Atrevido" / "Deep Purple" [MEL 33/MEL 40]	Italian/Australian accordion player, father of actress Peta Toppano
1016	Enso Toppano	"Tea for Two" / "Hora Staccato" [MEL39/ ]	Accordion Solo with Bass Acc.
1017	Mary Burns and her Boy Friends	Do I Worry ? / "My Christmas Wish"	
1018	Doina et ses Tziganes	"Hora Staccato" / "Pastorale Tzigane" [2561 ST / 2562 ST]	
1019	Doina et ses Tziganes, Typica Orchestra	"Desillusion" / "Nuit Noire"	
1020	Doina et ses Tziganes, Typica Orchestra	"Chispazo" / "El Mac Mahon"	
1021	Doina etses Tziganes, Typica Orchestra	"Danse Hongroise No 5" / "Czardas" (/0472ACP)	
1022	Eddie Calvert & His Rumba Band	" Miserlou" / "Hora Samba" (with orchestra)	Eddie Calvert band cuts four sides for Melodisc.
1023	Eddie Calvert & Orchestra, Rumba Band, Ricardo	"Gypsy Lullaby" / (with Orchestra, Ricardo on vocals), - "Son Mambo" (with Rumba, Ricardo on vocals) [MEL 62]	
1024	Gabor Radics & his Tzigane Orchestra	"Come Gypsy" / "Serenade Gitane"	
1025	Gabor Radics & his Tzigane Orchestra	Iablotchko/Stenka [MEL80/MEL81]	
1026	Gabor Radics & his Tzigane Orchestra	"The Roumanian Swallow" / "Old Hungarian Dances" [MEL 82]	
1027	Crane River Jazz Band	"Eh, La-Bas!" / "Just A Closer Walk With Thee" [Mel126/Mel128]	
1028	Roy Sturgis	Elite Syncopations /Easy Winners (Scott Joplin Rags) [Mel.138/Mel.137] {06/1951}	
1029	Howard McGhee Sextet	"Leave My Heart" / "Bean Stalking" [Mel70/Mel71] [Asch 3551 (795/791)]	
1030	Crane River Jazz Band	"Just A Little While To Stay Here" / "Dauphin St Blues" [Mel130/Mel127]	
1031	Louis Jordan & His Tympany Five	"Dad Gum Ya Hide Boy" / "Is My Pop In There?"	
1032			
1033	Mighty Terror & His Calypsonians	"The Queen Is In" / "Chinese Children" [DA2189/DA2153 ]	
1034	Lester Young	"After You've Gone" / "No Eyes Blues"	Lester Young (tenor sax); Willie Smith (alto saxophone); Wesley Jones (piano); Curtis Counce (bass); Johnny Otis (drums)
1035	Lord Beginner, Calypso Rhythm Boys	"Mama me belly hurt me" / "Louise" [DA2164 / DA2167]	
1101	Sister Ernestine B. Washington, Bunk Johnson Jazz Band	"Where Could I Go But To The Lord" / "God's Amazing Grace" [O.287/O.288] [DISC 6039 (D709 /D710)]	
1102	Sister Ernestine B. Washington, Bunk Johnson Jazz Band	"Does Jesus Care?" / "The Lord Will Make A Way Somehow" [707/708] – [DISC 6038 (D707 /D708)]	According to Hayes/Laughton, the Ernestine Washington platters were recorded in NYC on either 2 or 4 January 1946 with Bunk Johnson's Jazz Band, and are: Jubilee 2501: "Does Jesus Care?" / "The Lord Will Make a Way Somehow"; Jubilee 2502: "Where Could I Go But to the Lord" / "God's Amazing Grace"; The discography goes on to say, however, that the Jubilee records were never issued. They were issued on the Disc label instead after the purchase of the matrices by Mo Asch. (Cedric J. Hayes, Gospel Records, 1943–1969: A Black Music Discography (paperback), Robert Laughton)
1103	Sidney Bechet with Humphrey Lyttelton's Band	"Some of These Days" /"Black And Blue" (O.417/O.418) [Savoy 744]	Recorded in London, 13 November 1949, by Melodisc Records. This record is rare because Sidney Bechet did not have the necessary papers to play in London, so this was illegally recorded.
1104	Sidney Bechet with Humphrey Lyttelton's Band	"Who's Sorry Now" / "Sleepy Time Down South" (O.419/O.420) [Savoy 745]	
1105	Sidney Bechet with Humphrey Lyttelton And His Band	"I Told You Once, I Told You Twice" /"Georgia (On My Mind)" (O.421/O.422) [Savoy 746]	Recorded in London, 13 November 1949
1106	Two Gospel Keys / Thrasher Wonders	"Charity" (Two Gospel Keys) "(Sometimes I Feel Like A) Motherless Child" (Thrasher Wonders) [O.430] [DISC 5013 (D152/D154)]	Emma Daniels, vocals and guitar Mother Sally Jones, vocal and tambourine Andrew Gearhardt & Bernice Thrasher)
1107	Warren "Baby" Dodds	"Maryland" / "Tom Tom Workout" [O.167/O.169] [DISC 6006]	
1108	Warren "Baby" Dodds	"Spooky Drums" / "Rudiments with Drumstick Nerve-Beat" [D116/D118] [DISC 6007]	
1109	Stan Getz, Tenor Sax Stars	"Four And One Moore" / "Five Brothers" [JRC17/JRC18]	Stan Getz tenor sax with Allen Eager, Al Cohn, Brew Moore, Zoot Sims & Rhythm Section [New Jazz 802]
1110	Lennie Tristano Quintet	"Subconscious-lee" / "Judy" [JRC8/JRC11] [New Jazz 80.001, 808 (JRC8J/ JRC11B)]	Lennie Tristano (piano); Lee Konitz (alto); Billy Bauer (guitar); Shelly Manne (drums); Arnold Fishkind (bass)
1111	Lee Konitz Quintet	"Fishin' Around" / "Marshmallow" [JRC29/JRC30] [New Jazz NJ 807]	Lee Konitz (alto); Warne Marsh (tenor); Sal Mosca (piano); Denzil Best (drums); Arnold Fishkind (bass)
1112			
1113			
1114			
1115	Doc Evans Dixieland Band	"Fidgety Feet" / "Clarinet Marmalade" (D757/D758) [DISC 6071]	Doc Evans (cornet); Ed Hubble (trombone); Tony Parenti (clarinet); Joe Sullivan (piano); George Wettling (drums); New York, 25–26 April 1947] see 1142/3 below
1116	Doc Evans Dixieland Band	"Sensation Rag" / "At The Jazz Band Ball" [D759/D760] [DISC 6072]	Features Doc Evans, Ed Hubble, Tony Parenti, Joe Sullivan, George Wettling
1117	Kai Winding Sextette	"Sid's Bounce" / "A Night on Bop Mountain" [JRC34/JRC37B] [New Jazz NJ 809]	Kai Winding (trombone); Brew Moore (tenor sax); Gerry Mulligan (baritone sax); George Wallington (piano); Curly Russell (bass); Roy Haynes (drums)
1118	Ralph Sharon Sextet	"Burman's Bauble" /"Boptical Illusion" [Mel1/Mel2]	Ralph Sharon (piano); Pete Chilver (guitar); Jimmy Skidmore (tenor sax), Victor Feldman (vibes); Jack Fallon (bass); Martin Aston (drums) (27 March 1950)
1119	Ralph Sharon Sextet	"I've Got You Under My Skin" / "There's a Small Hotel" (MEL3/MEL4)	Ralph Sharon Sextet as above, MEL3 -Skidmore (27 March 1950)
1120	Fats Navarro Quintet	"Go" / "Stop" [JRC36/JRC38] [New Jazz 812]	Fats Navarro (trumpet); Don Lanphere (tenor sax); Al Haig (piano); Tommy Potter (bass); Max Roach (drums)
1121	J.J. Johnson All Stars/ Don Lanphere Quartet	"Teapot" / "Spider's Webb" [602A/JRC32] – [New Jazz 820 / 810]	J.J. Johnson (trombone); Sonny Stitt (tenor sax); John Lewis (piano); Nelson Boyd (bass); Max Roach (drums) Don Lanphere, Duke Jordan, Tubby Phillips & Roy Hall
1122	J.J. Johnson Allstars / Stan Getz & Terry Gibbs New Jazz Stars	"Afternoon In Paris" / "Cuddles" [600A /JRC15] – [New Jazz 8203/803]	"Afternoon in Paris": J.J. Johnson (trombone); Sonny Stitt (tenor sax); John Lewis (piano); Nelson Boyd (bass); Max Roach (drums) "Cuddles"; Stan Getz (tenor sax); Terry Gibbs (vibes); Shorty Rogers (trumpet); Earl Swope (trombone), George Wallington (piano); Shadow Wilson (drums); Curley Russell (bass)
1123	Lu Watters Yerba Buena Jazz Band	"At A Georgia Camp Meeting" / "Original Jelly Roll Blues" [MLB107/MLB108] – [Jazz Man 4:GTJ 59]	Lu Watters (cornet); Bob Scobey (trumpet); Turk Murphy (trombone); Ellis Horne (clarinet); Wally Rose (piano); Clancy Hayes (banjo); Russ Bennett (banjo); Dick Lammi (tuba); Bill Dart (drums) Recorded 19–20 December 1941.
1124	Lu Watters Yerba Buena Band	"Daddy Do" / "Millenberg Joys" [MLB125/MLB126] – [Jazz Man 13]	Recorded 29 March 1942.
1125	Lu Watters Yerba Buena Jazz Band	"Muskrat Ramble" / "Smokey Mokes" [MLB106/MLB112] – [Jazz Man 3: GTJ 58]	Recorded 19–20 December 1941.
1126	Lu Watters Yerba Jazz Band	"Tiger Rag/Come Back, Sweet Papa" [MLB120/MLB130] – [Jazz Man 6]	Recorded 29 March 1942.
1127	Brownie McGhee	"Me And My Dog" / "Secret Mojo Blues" [D787/D788] – [DISC /6058]	
1128	Wardell Gray Quartet	"Twisted" / "Easy Living" [MEL.5/MEL.6] [New Jazz 817] [JRC46/JRC48]	Wardell Gray (tenor sax); Al Haig (piano); Tommy Potter (bass); Roy Haynes (drums)
1129	Ralph Sharon Sextet	"A Nightingale Sang In Berkeley Square" / "The Very Thought of You" [MEL19/MEL24]	
1130	Meade "Lux" Lewis	"Boogie Tidal" / "Yancey's Pride" [MEL12/MEL7] – [ASCH 352-1]	
1131	Lord Beginner, Calypso Rhythm Kings	"The Joe Louis Calypso" / "Trinidad Blues" (MEL26/MEL27) [ Savoy 809] ||	
1132	Lennie Tristano Quartet	"Speculation" / "Through These Portals" [MELD853/D852] [DISC 5500 (D583/D582)]	Lennie Tristano (piano); John La Porta (clarinet); Billy Bauer (guitar); Arnold Fishkind (bass)
1133	Lord Beginner, Calypso Rhythm Kings	"Victory Test Match (England v West Indies, Lords 1950)" (aka "Cricket lovely Cricket")/"Sergeant Brown" [MEL20/MEL23]	
1134	Lord Beginner (Egbert Moore), Calypso Rhythm Kings	"Straight Hair Gal" / "Boul've se" [Bowl' vi-sé, le Duc] [MEL21/Savoy 809]	John Cowley, "I Been Down In The Circle Before Black music, topicality and social history", 6 March 2007.
1135	Erroll Garner	"Lady Be Good" / "Don't Blame Me" [D232/D233] [DISC 5002/DISC5003]	
1136	Meade Lux Lewis	"Denapas Parade" / "Glendale Glide" [MEL9/MEL10] [ASCH 352-2 (746/728)]	
1137	Pee-Wee Russell's Rhythmakers and Ruby Braffococa (vocals)	"Baby, Won't You Please Come Home?" / "Dinah" [HRS23391/HRS23394] [Hot Record Society HRS 1000 (P23391/ P23394]	Pee Wee Russell (clarinet); Dicky Wells (trombone); Al Gold (tenor sax); Max Kaminsky (trumpet); Zutty Singleton (drums); James P. Johnson (piano); Freddie Green (guitar); Wellman Braud (bass)
1138	Lonnie Johnson	"Solid Blues" / "Rocks in My Bed" [MEL 13/MEL 14] – [DISC 6063]	John Davis (piano)
1139	Louise Bennett, The Caribbean Serenaders feat. Leslie Hutchinson, trumpet	"Linstead Market" / "Bongo Man" [MEL 28/MEL29]	
1140	Leadbelly with Sanders Terry	"Good Morning Blues" / "How Long, How Long Blues" (MEL263/MEL260)[ASCH 343-1]	Leadbelly (vocals, 12 string guitar); Sanders Terry (harmonica)
1141	Woody Guthrie	"Ramblin' Blues" / "Talkin' Columbia Blues" [D201/D202] [DISC 5011/ DISC 5012]	
1142	Doc Evans Dixieland Band	"Original Dixieland One Step" / "Barnyard Blues" [D755/D756] [DISC 6070]	
1143	Doc Evans Dixieland Band	"Bugle Call Rag" / "Tin Roof Blues" [MEL761/MEL762] [DISC 6073]	
1144	James P. Johnson Trio	"Everybody Loves My Baby" / "I Found A New Baby" [MEL43/MEL42] [ASCH]	James P. Johnson (piano); Pee Wee Russell (clarinet); Zutty Singleton (drums)
1145	Josh White	"Fare Thee Well" / "Outskirts Of Town" [MEL64/MEL159][ASCH438-1/ASCH438-2]	
1146	Josh White	"The House I Live In" / "When I Lay Down And Die, Do Die" [MEL169/MEL60] [ASCH438-3/Stinson]	
1147			
1148	Lu Watters Yerba Buena Jazz Band	"Creole Belles" / "Chattanooga Stomp" [MEL41/MEL44] [West Coast 102]	Lu Watters (cornet, trumpet); Bob Scobey (trumpet); Turk Murray (trombone); Ellis Horne (clarinet); Wally Rose (piano); Clancy Hayes (banjo); Russ Bennett (banjo); Dick Lammi (tuba); Bill Dart (drums)
1149	Lu Watters Yerba Buena Jazz Band	"Working Man's Blues" /"Big Bear Stomp" (Mel45 /Mel46) [West Coast 104]	
1150	Lu Watters Yerba Buena Jazz Band	"Copenhagen" / "Jazzin' Babies Blues" [Mel47/Mel 48] [West Coast 117]	
1151	Leadbelly with Sanders Terry	"Goodnight Irene" / "Ain't You Glad" [MEL261/MEL262] [ASCH 343-2]	Leadbelly (vocals, 12 string guitar); Sanders Terry (harmonica)
1152	Meade Lux Lewis	"Randini's Boogie" / "Lux's Boogie" [MEL 730/MEL 731][ASCH 352-3]	
1153	Elton Hayes	"The Phantom Stage Coach" / "Just a-wearyin' for you" [MEL51/MEL52]	
1154	Elton Hayes	"The Wild Colonial Boy" /"Back to Hilo" [MEL53 / MEL54]	
1155	Josh White	"Dupree" / "Miss Otis Regrets" [MELD223/MELD221] [DISC 3004A/DISC 3005B]	
1156	Ralph Sharon Sextet	"Two Sleepy People" / "Stalking the Stork" [MEL66/MEL68]	
1157	Art Tatum	"Fine & Dandy" / "Ja Da" [MEL 356/MEL 357] [Asch 356-1/Asch 356-2]	
1158	Lu Watters Yerba Buena Jazz Band	"1919 Rag" / "Ostrich Walk" [WC105A/Mel57] [West Coast 111]	
1159	Lord Kitchener, Vincent Street Six	"Pirates Of Paria (The Floating Murder)" / "Cold In The Winter" [MEL 94/MEL 95 ] {1951}	
1160	Lord Kitchener, Vincent Street Six	"Kitch (Small Comb, Scratch Me Head)" / "Food From The West Indies" [MEL96/MEL97]	
1161	"Ralph Sharon Sextet	Sloppy Joe" / "You Go to My Head" [MEL25/MEL65]	
1162	Lord Kitchener, Freddy Grant's Caribbean Rhythm	"Kitch's Bebop" / "Kitch's Cricket Calypso" [Mel72/Mel76] {1951}	Alwyn "Lord Kitchener "Roberts, acc. by Freddy Grant's Caribbean Rhythm: Freddy Grant (to?); Bertle King (alto); Mike McKenzie (piano); Fitzroy Coleman (guitar); Neville Boucarut (bass); Clinton Maxwell (des) Recorded 15 March 1951. London.
1163	Lord Kitchener, Freddy Grant's Caribbean Rhythm	"Festival of Britain Calypso" / "London Is The Place For Me" (MEL73/MEL74)	
1164	Lord Kitchener	"Dividing the Cricket Spoils (Parts 1 & 2)"	Brothers Chrisofer and Batson talk about 1950s cricket and cash. (Dark Argument (Caribbean Crosstalk))
1165	Crane River Jazz Band	"Down By The River" / "Blanche Touquatouz" [MEL125/MEL129]	
1166	Joe Saye Trio	"Pink Champagne" / "Three of a Mind" [MEL 134/MEL135]	Recorded 12 April 1951, Joe Saye (piano, accordion); Johnny Wiltshire (guitar); Lawrence Anthony (bass)
1167	Lord Beginner	Calypso Rhythm Kings	"Family Scandal" / "Gold Coast Champion (Ankarah v Clayton)" (Mel102/Mel103)
1168	Mona Baptiste, Freddy Grant's Caribbean Rhythm	"Amatine - Beguine" / "Clementine - Castillene" [MEL117/MEL114]	
1169	Ralph Sharon Trio	"Slightly Oliver" / "A Bachelor Gay" [Mel112/Mel113]	
1170	Lu Watters Yerba Buena Jazz Band	"South" / "Richard M. Jones Blues" [WC67/WC156] [West Coast 106]	
1171	Trio Donaldo	"Bongo Train" / "The Gatehouse" [Mel. 139/Mel.140]	
1172	Lord Kitchener, Freddy Grant's Caribbean Rhythm	"The Denis Compton Calypso" / "No More Taxi" [Mel 149 /Mel 150]	
1173	Christie Brothers Stompers	"Creole Song" / "Heebie Jeebies" [Mel.141/Mel.143]	
1174	Joe Saye Trio	"Harlem Nocturne" / "Forte" [Mel 131 / Mel]	Recorded 12 April 1951, Joe Saye (piano, accordion); Johnny Wiltshire (guitar); Lawrence Anthony (bass)
1175	Tony Johnson, Caribbean Serenaders	"Mango Walk" / "Me Donkey Want Water" (Mel 145/Mel 146)	
1176	Ralph Sharon Trio	"Heart and Soul" /"You Are My Lucky Star" / [Mel63/Mel110]	
1177	Lord Kitchener, Freddy Grant's Caribbean Rhythm	"Saxophone" / "Randolph Turpin's Victory Calypso" (Turpin v Robinson July 1951) [Mel151/Mel152]	
1178	Eddie Calvert, His Trumpet and His Orchestra (from Selby's Restaurant)	"With a Song in My Heart" / "Kiss Me Again" (Mel164/Mel165)	
1179	Tito Burns Sextet	"I Can't Get Started" / "Euphoria" [Mel175/Mel178]	
1180	Lu Watters Yerba Buena Jazz Band	"Friendless Blues" / "I'm Going Huntin'" [WC69/WC75] (West Coast 109)	
1181	Mona Baptiste, Freddy Grant's Caribbean Rhythm	"Calypso Blues" / "Ba Mwe Un Ti Bo'" (Kiss Me Once More) [Mel160/Mel161]	"Calypso Blues" with Billy Sholanke (congo drum); Calypso - Afro / Martiniquean Beguine in French patois
1182	Tony Johnson, Caribbean Serenaders	"Swine Lane Gal" / "Iron Bar" (Mel147/Mel148)	
1183	Lord Beginner, Calypso Rhythm Kings	"Jamaica Hurricane" / "Pretty Woman" (MEL183/MEL180)	
1184	Roaring Lion, Freddy Grant's Caribbean Rhythm	"Royal Wedding - Calypso" / "Spanish Calypso" (Mel188/Mel189)	
1185	Trinidad Steel Band/Fitzroy Coleman Quintet	"Caroline" / "Six String Calypso" [Mel55/ Mel185]	
1186	Lonnie Johnson with John Davis	"Blues For Everybody" / "In Love Again" [D493/D494][DISC 6065/6064]	John Davis (piano)
1187	Leadbelly with Sonny Terry / Leadbelly with Sonny Terry and Brownie McGhee	"John Henry" /"On a Monday" [Mel259/Mel258] – [Asch 343-3]	Leadbelly (vocals, guitar); Sonny Terry (harmonica)
1188	Mike McKenzie's Habaneros	"Al Momento" /"The Peanut Vendor"	
1189	Calypso Rhythm Kings with The Duke	"L'annee Passee" / "Sans l'eau" [Mel181/Mel182]	Vocal in French Patois with Orchestra
1190	Thrasher Wonders	"Blind Old Barnabus" / "Jesus I Love You" [Mel193/Mel194] [D163/D159] [DISC 5015]	
1191	Chicago Bill (Big Bill Broonzy)	"Keep Your Hands Off" / "Stump Blues" [D467/D468]	Recorded for Melodisc in Britain, 1951.
1192	Lord Kitchener, Freddy Grant's Caribbean Rhythm	"Carnival Road March" / "Jingle Bells -Calypso" [MEL211/MEL212]	
1193	Lord Beginner, Calypso Rhythm Kings / The Lion, Freddy Grant's Caribbean Rhythm	"John Goddard" / "Some Girl Something" [MEL184/MEL190]	
1194	Mona Baptiste, Freddy Grant's Caribbean Rhythm	"Tabu" / "Blendeena (Castillene)" (MEL158/]	
1195	Tito Burns Sextet	"Elora" / "Pina Colado" [MEL176/MEL177]	"Pina Colado": Terry Devon and Tito Burns (vocal)
1196	Christie Brothers Stompers	Salutation Stomp/Bogalusa Moan [MEL 208/MEL210]	Ken Colyer (cornet); Keith Christie (trombone); Ian Christie (clarinet); Pat Hawes (piano); Ben Marshall (banjo); Denny Coffey (bass)
1197	Tommy Whittle Group	"All The Things You Are" / "Sam's Say" [Mel198/Mel226]	Quartet-Tommy Whittle (tenor sax); Ronnie Ball (piano); Frank Donnison (bass); Tony Kinsey (drums)] Septet - Bobby Pratt (trumpet); Roy Willox (alto sax); Tommy Whittle (tenor sax); George Hunter (bass sax); Frank Horrox (piano); Johnny Hawksworth (bass); Ronnie Verrell (drums)
1198	Bertie King's Jamaicans and Tony Johnson / Bertie King's Jamaicans	"Donkey City" / "Sweetie Charlie" [Mel215/Mel218]	"Donkey City": Tony Johnson (vocals)
1199	Barretto Brothers Famous Cuban Orchestra	"El Mamboleo" / "Quiereme De Una Vez" [Mel203/ ]	Featuring Don Marino Barretto at the piano
1200	Ralph Sharon Sextet	"Someone to Watch Over Me" / "Don's Dilemma" [Mel229/Mel107]	
1201	Ralph Sharon Sextet	"I Get a Kick Out of You" / "Skylark " [Mel228/Mel108]	Keith Bird (tenor sax); Martin Slavin (vibes); Ralph Sharon (piano); Alan Metcalfe (guitar); Bert Howard (bass); Leon Roy (drums)
1202	Crane River Jazz Band	"Sheik Of Araby" / "Sobbin' Blues" [Mel 234/ Mel 236]	
1203	Chicago Bill	"Five Foot Seven" / "Plough Hand Blues" [MEL D469/MEL D470]	Recorded for Melodisc in Britain, 1951
1204	Christie Brothers Stompers	"Black Cat" / "Hiawatha Rag" [MEL207 /MEL 209]	
1205	Tommy Whittle Sextet / Tommy Whittle Group	"Portland Place" /"Perhaps, Perhaps, Perhaps" [Mel 225 /Mel 199]	(Sextet-as 1197/Group Tommy Whittle (tenor sax); George Hunter (bass sax); Bobby Pratt (trumpet); Roy Willox (alto sax); Frank Horrox (piano); Johnny Hawksworth (bass); Ronnie Verrell (drums)
1206	Lord Kitchener	"Life In England (Parts 1 and 2)"	Dark Argument (Caribbean Crosstalk); See Also Below
1206	Tito Burns and his Sextet	Over a bottle of wine /Undecided	Recorded 9 January 1952 (Melodisc). Leon Calvert (trumpet); Jimmy Chester (alto sax, bass sax); Rex Morris (tenor sax); Tito Burns (accordion); Ronnie Price (piano); Johnny Hawksworth (bass); Derek Price (drums); Terry Devon (vocals)
1207	Mike McKenzie's Habaneros	"Mama Inez" / "Maria, My Own" [Mel155 / Mel163]	
1208	Lord Kitchener, Freddy Grant's Caribbean Rhythm	"Africa My Home" / "My Landlady" [MEL276/ MEL289]	
1209	Young Tiger, Russell Henderson's Calypso Band	"Monkey - Calypso" / "Single Man - Calypso" (Mel272/Mel214)	Young Tiger also known as George Browne.
1210	Ricardo, Russell Henderson's Calypso Band	"Banana Song" / "Grenada (Land of Spice)" (Mel275/Mel273)	
1211	Lord Beginner, Calypso Rhythm Kings/ Lord and Lady Beginner, Calypso Rhythm Kings	"Australia v West Indies Calypso" / "One Morning" [Mel 303 /Mel302]	
1212	Christie Brothers Stompers	"Down in Jungle Town" / "Farewell to Storyville" [MEL294/MEL297]	
1213	Ralph Sharon Sextet	"Zing Went the Strings of My Heart"/"Serenade In Blue" [Mel231/Mel 249]	Keith Bird (tenor sax), Martin Slavin (vibes), Ralph Sharon (piano), Alan Metcalfe (guitar), Bert Howard (bass), Leon Roy (drums)
1214	The Ticklers and Harold Richardson	"Glamour Gal" / "Don't Fence Her In" [MOT 08-1/MOT 08-2] (Motta's MRS 08 (01-8/01-9)	Harold Richardson (vocals)
1215	Four Deuces and Kingsley Swan / Four Deuces	"People in the West Indies" (Calypso Islanders) / "Soldiers Song" [MEL 306/MEL 307]	"People in the West Indies": Kingsley Swan (vocals)
1216	Kenny Baker & His Orchestra	"The Very Thought Of You" / "The Night Is Young And You're So Beautiful" (Mel298/Mel299)	Recorded 3 March 1952. Kenny Baker, Harry Lethman, Allen Franks, Freddie Clayton (trumpets); Harry Roche, Don Lusher (trombones); Dougie Robinson, Bill Jackson, Keith Bird, Harry Klein (reeds); Stan Tracey (piano); Alan McDonald (bass); Johnny Flanagan (drums)
1217	Frank Ross, the Human Trumpet	"Why Should I Cry Over You"/ "Sugar Blues" [Mel239/Mel240]	
1218	Victor Feldman All Stars	"Lullaby in rhythm" / "Serenity" [MEL308/MEL309]	Recorded London, 3 March 1952. Jummy Deuchar (trumpet); Ken Wray (trombone); Derek Humble (alto sax); Harry Klein (bass sax); Victor Feldman (vibes); Stan Tracey (piano); Lennie Bush (bass); Martin Ashton (drums)
1219	Joe Saye Trio	"Unison We" / "There's A Small Hotel" [/Mel119]	Recorded 27 April 1952. Joe Saye (piano, accordion); Johnny Wiltshire (guitar); Lawrence Anthony (bass)
1220	Christie Brothers Stompers	"You Always Hurt The One You Love" / "I'm So Glad" [MEL295/MEL296]	K Christie (trombone); D Hawden (trumpet); I Christie (clarinet); P Hawes (piano); B Marshall (banjo); D Coffey (bass); B Saward (drums)
1221	Lonnie Johnson	"Blues In My Soul" / "Keep What You Got" [D495/D485] [DISC 6065 /6062]	John Davis accompanies on guitar
1222	Lord Kitchener, Freddy Grant's Caribbean Rhythm	"Two Timing Josephine" / "Tie Tongue Mopsie" (Darling Get Up, My Grandmother Coming 12 O'Clock) [Mel 278/Mel 277]	
1223	Sterling Bettancourt, Wizard of the Ping Pong with Russell Henderson's Calypso Band	"Ping Pong Samba" / "Ping Pong Lullaby" [MEL 312/MEL 313]	
1224	Tony Johnson, Mike McKenzie's Habaneros	"Without You" / "Cuban Love Song" [MEL 268/MEL 269]	
1225	Arnold Ross Quintet	"Janie" / "Twelve to Four" [MEL 367/MEL 370]	Arnold Ross (piano); Jimmy Deuchar (trumpet); Tommy Whittle (tenor sax); Joe Benjamin (bass); Jack Parnell (dms) / Arnold Ross (piano); Jimmy Deuchar (trumpet); Tommy Whittle (tenor sax); Joe Benjamin (bass); Tony Kinsey (drums)
1226	Arnold Ross Trio/Arnold Ross Quintette	"Darn That Dream" / "Speechless" [MEL 368/]	Arnold Ross (piano); Joe Benjamin (bass); Jack Parnell (dms)/ Arnold Ross (piano); Jimmy Deuchar (trumpet); Tommy Whittle (tenor sax); Joe Benjamin (bass); Tony Kinsey (drums)
1227	Ralph Sharon Sextet	"Bill" / "Where Or When" [MEL 349/ ]	Keith Bird, Jimmy Skidmore (tenor saxes); Martin Slavin (vibes); Ralph Sharon (piano); Alan Metcalfe, Roy Plummer (guitars); Bert Howard, Joe Mudele (bass); Leon Roy, Harvey Bond (drums); Alan Graham (vibes)
1228	Crane River Jazz Band	"Careless Love" / "Spicy Advice" [MEL235/MEL23?]	S. Morris (trumpet); R. Orpwood (trombone); M. Sunshine (clarinet); P. Dearle (piano); L. Page (banjo); J. Davies (bass); P. Appleby (drums)
1229	Lord Beginner, Calypso Rhythm Kings /Lord and Lady Beginner, Calypso Rhythm Kings	"Don't Tickle Me, Dorothy" / "Mix Up Matrimony" [MEL345/MEL346]	
1230	Lord Beginner, The Melodisc Calypso Boys	"Nice Woman, Ugly Man" / "BG Bargee" - Shanto/" [MEL 351 / MEL 354]	Featuring Rannie Hart (trumpet) and Mike McKenzie (piano)
1231	Tony Johnson and Bertie King's Jamaicans / Bertie King's Jamaicans	"Sly Mongoose " - Mento/"Imogene" - Mento [Mel217/Mel216]	Featuring Bertie King (clarinet) "Sly Mongoose": Tony Johnson (vocals)
1232	Victor Feldman All Stars	"Just Friends" / "Euphony"	Recorded London, 3 March 1952. Jimmy Deuchar (trumpet); Ken Wray (trombone); Derek Humble (alto sax); Harry Klein (bass sax); Victor Feldman (vibes); Stan Tracey (piano); Lennie Bush (bass); Martin Ashton (drums)
1233	Tommy Whittle Group	"Night And Day" / "Wits End" [MEL227/MEL224]	23 October 1951; Bobby Pratt (trumpet); Roy Willox (alto sax); Tommy Whittle (tenor sax); George Hunter (bass sax); Frank Horrox (piano); Johnny Hawksworth (bass); Ronnie Verrell (drums)
1234	Christie Brothers Stompers	"Old Fashioned Love" / "Fly Cat Boogie" [PL 928/PL 931]	
1235			
1236	The Lion, Freddy Grant's Caribbean Rhythm	"The Coronation of Elizabeth II" / "Crosby Cavalcade" [PL963/Mel187]	
1237	The Ticklers and Harold Richardson	"Four Days Love" / "Healing In the Balm Yard" [MOT2146/MOT2147] – [MRS 13]	Harold Richardson (vocals)
1238	The Ticklers and Harold Richardson	"What a Hard Time" / "Advice to Men" [MOT2148/MOT2149] [MRS14]	Harold Richardson (vocals)
1239	The Ticklers and Harold Richardson	"Parish Gal" / "Hard Hearted Lover" [MOT2150/MOT2151] [MRS 15]	Harold Richardson (vocals)
1240	Lord Kitchener	"Liebling Kitch" / "Rockabye Kitchie" [Mel213/Mel214] (1952)	
1241	Lord Beginner, the Calypso Rhythm Kings	"Young Boys Scandal" / "Woman Going Up" [MEL343/MEL344]	
1242	Tony Johnson, Cyril Jones' Calypso Boys	"Marilyn Monroe Calypso" / "Nosey Joe" (DA2002/DA2005)	
1243	Young Tiger, Cyril Jones' Calypso Boys	"Black Coffee" / "Take Me" [MEL315/]	
1244	Young Tiger, Cyril Jones' Calypso Boys / Tony Johnson and Young Tiger, Cyril Jones' Calypso Boys	"Flying Enterprise Mystery" / "Brown Skin Gal" [DA2001/DA2003]	
1245	Lord Kitchener, Fitzroy Coleman and his Sunny Boys	"My Mistress Maria" / "Swing High Swing Low" [DA2106/DA2108] {1953}	
1246	Lord Beginner, The Melodisc Calypso Boys	"Fed- a -Ray"/ ?	
1247	King Tim's Calypso Boys	"Gerrard Street" / "Nylon" [DA2006/ DA2008]	King Timoth on label
1248			
1249	Lord Beginner, The Melodisc Calypso Boys	"Tommy Do The Jive" / "I Got It Already"	
1250	Lord Kitchener, Fitzroy Coleman's Sunny Boys	"Muriel And The Bug" / "Norma And The Yankee" [DA2017 / DA2019]	
1251	Barreto Brothers Famous Cuban Orchestra	Cecilia / Flamenco Cubana [Mel 204/ Mel 205]	Piano Solo Don Marino Barretto
1252	Mona Baptiste, Freddy Grant's Caribbean Rhythm	"Amour Pedido" / "Planting Rice" [Mel 116/ Mel 157]	
1253	Lord Kitchener, Fitzroy Coleman's Trinidad Ragers	"Kitch Take It Easy" / "Redhead" [DA2032/DA2033]	
1254	Lord Kitchener, Fitzroy Coleman's Trinidad Ragers	"Drink A Rum" / "Your Wife And My Wife" [DA2034/DA2021]	
1255			
1256	Eric Hayden, the Gulf Stream Calypso Band	"Montego Bay" / "Give Her The No. 1" [DA2028/DA2031]	
1257	Four Deuces, Fitzroy Coleman's Trinidad Ragers	"Emelda" / "Uncle Joe"	
1258	Duke Of Iron & The Four Deuces	"Nora" / "Parakeets"	
1259	Duke Of Iron, Calypso Troubadours	"Creole Gal" / "Music Lesson" [DA2041/DA 2038] [Monogram]	
1260	Lord Kitchener, Fitzroy Coleman's Trinidad Ragers	"If You're Not White, You're Black" / "Old Lady Walk A Mile And A Half" [DA2043/DA2045]	
1261	Little Nora, "Hot Lips" Pete's Band	"(Don't Touch Me) Tomato" / "Nora's Blues" [DA2055/DA2056]	
1262	Ronnie Meede	"Don't Take Your Love From Me" / "What is the weather like in Paris?" [DA2067 / DA2068]	
1263	Joe Saye and His Music	"Love Walked In" / "These Foolish Things" [DA2049/DA2050]	
1264	Fitzroy Coleman Band	"Asi yo siemto" / "Mambo mood"	
1265	Eric Hayden, the Gulf Stream Calypso Band	"Belly Lick" / "Fan Me, Soldier, Fan Me" [DA2029/]	
1266	Lord Beginner, Rupert's Calypso Band	The Queen' Visits Her People /After The Bacchanal [DA2065 / ]	
1267	King Tim's Calypso Boys (Al Timothy)	"Football Calypso" / "Ju Jujitsu - Calypso" [DA2072/DA2071]	King Timoth on label
1268	Fitzroy Coleman's All Stars	"Off Limits" / "Crossing The Bridge" [DA2036/]	
1269	The Lion, Caribbean Calypso Band	"La Familia Lopez" / "Sanga Branga" [DA2064?/DA2067]	
1270	Lord Kitchener, Fitzroy Coleman's Trinidad Ragers	"When The Baby's Born" / "Rhumba Anna" [DA2037/DA2044]	
1271	Lord Kitchener, Fitzroy Coleman's Trinidad Ragers	"Too Late, Kitch" / "Saxophone No. 2" [DA2051/DA2022]	
1272	Helen Davis, Jack Newman Orchestra	"We'll Always Remember / "Once In Ev'ryone's Life" [DA2088/DA2089]	
1273	Lord Beginner, Caribbean Calypso Band	"The Cricket Champions (West Indies v MCC 1954)" / "Caribbean Lullaby" [DA2082/DA2083]	
1274	George Browne, The Club de Faubourg Orchestra	"A-Wimoweh" / "Honey Maid" [DA2086 / ]	
1275	Nancy Holloway, The Rhythm Boys	"Hip Shakin' Mamma" / "Watermelon" [DA2107/DA2108] {1953}	
1276			
1277	Eric Hayden, the Gulf Stream Calypso Band	"Old Lady Mash Me Toe" / "Money Hustling Woman" [DA2081/DA2093]	
1278	Joe Harriott Quartet	"Cherokee" / "Out of Nowhere" [DA 2095/DA 2096]	Harry Bence and Joe Harriott have both recorded for Melodisc in February 1954.) Joe Harriott (alto sax); Jack Fallon (bass); Phil Seaman (drums); Dill Jones (piano)
1279	Harry Bence Orchestra	"IBirth of the Blues" / "Flamingo" [DA2103/DA2104]	
1280	Lord Kitchener, Fitzroy Coleman's Calypso Band	"Nosey mother-in-law" / "Elsie's River" [DA2046/DA2117] {1954}	
1281	Harry Bence Orchestra	"I May Be Wrong" / "Apropos" [DA2105/DA2106]	Harry Bence and Joe Harriott have both recorded for Melodisc in February 1954. Harry Bence Orchestra made its recording at a Melodisc session in February 1954.
1282	Archie Lewis, Malcolm Lockyer & His Orchestra	"Make Her Mine" / "To Be Or Not To Be"	
1283			
1284	Lee Young, Woolf Phillips & His Orchestra	"I'm Gonna Rock, Rock, Rock" / "Merci Beaucoup" [DA2121/DA2122]	
1285	Hedley Ward Trio	"Too Long" / "Just To Be With You"	
1286	Vic Ash All Stars	"Softly As In A Morning Sunrise" / "Blue Room" [DA2099/DA2101]	Vic Ash (clarinet); Allan Ganley (drums); Derek Smith (piano); Gerry McLoughlin (vibes); Johnny Hawkesworth (bass)
1287	The Lion, Caribbean Calypso Band	"Your shirt tail outside" / "Come punksie" [DA2075/DA2077]	
1288			
1289	Tom van Elst conducting The Amsterdam Symphonic Orchestra	"Jealousy" / "Spindrift" [DA2128/]	
1290	Lord Kitchener, Caribbean Calypso Band	"Mango Tree" / "(I Wish I Were A) Wife And Mother" (DA2127/DA2054)	
1291	Lord Kitchener, Coleman's Calypso Boys	"Courting Cats" / "Cricket Umpire" [DA2118/ DA2125	
1292	Russell Henderson Calypso Band	"Carnival In Cuba" / "Ping Pong Blues" [DA2130/DA2131]	Featuring Sterling Bettancourt on "Ping Pong"
1293			
1294	Hedley Ward Trio	"The Man With The Banjo" / "Do, Do, Do, Do, Do It Again" [DA2120/ DA2145]	
1295	Bobbie Collins with Johnnie Gray & His Band	"Whistling Guy" / "Wolf On The Prowl" [DA2160 / DA2161]	
1296	Ronnie Meede with The York de Sousa Trio	"Cuddle Me" / "Long Time Ago"	
1297	Geraldine Farrar	"Make Love To Me" / "Love, Tears And Kisses" [DA2147/]	
1298	Hedley Ward Trio	"A Sky Blue Shirt and a Rainbow Tie" / "Somebody Loves Me" [DA2148/DA2149]	
1299	Mighty Terror, Rupert Nurse Calypso Band	"Life In London" / "I'd Walk A Million Miles For Mammy"	
1300	Lord Kitchener, Fitzroy Coleman's Calypso Band	"Marjorie's Flirtation" / "My Wife Went Away With A Yankee" [DA2035/DA2053]	
1301			
1302	Kwamalah Quaye Sextetto Africana (Cab Kaye, Chris Ajilo, Frank Holder, Laurie Deniz)	"Son of Africa" / "Don't You Go Away" [DA2159/DA2160]	
1303	Reg Tilsley And His Orchestra	"Midnight Tango" / "Boulevard Waltz" [DA2162/DA2163]	
1304			
1305	Lord Beginner, Caribbean Calypso Band	"Colonials In England" / "Camilla" [DA2062/DA2066]	
1306			
1307			
1308	Rosita Rosano, San Juan Rhythm Boys	"Down In The Indies" / "Admiral's Daughter" [DA2154/DA2156]	
1309	Ronnie Pleydell & His Concert Orchestra	"To be your love" / "On Fifth Avenue" [/DA2198]	
1310	Lord Kitchener, Fitzroy Coleman's Calypso Band	"Is Trouble" / "St. Agnes" [DA2023/DA2115]	
1311	Young Tiger (George Browne), The Gulf Stream Band	"Chicken and Rice" / "African Dream" [DA 2084/DA 2085]	
1312			
1313			
1314			
1315	Vic Ash All Stars	"Ain't misbehavin'" / "Lullaby of the leaves" [DA2102/DA2100]	Vic Ash (clarinet); Allan Ganley (drums); Derek Smith (piano); Gerry McLoughlin (vibes); Johnny Hawkesworth (bass)
1316	Duke Of Iron, Trinidad Calypso Troubadours	"Big Bamboo" / "Last Train To San Fernando" [DA2040 / DA2042]	
1317	Joe Harriott Quartet	"Summertime" /" April In Paris" [DA 2097 /DA 2098]	
1318	Lord Kitchener, Calypso Rhythm Kings	"A Man In The Wardrobe, Vio" / "Constable Joe" [DA2240/DA2241]	
1319	The Mighty Terror, Fitzroy Coleman Calypso Band	"The Hydrogen Bomb" /"The Emperor of Africa" [DA2196/DA2197]	
1320	Rosita Rosano, San Juan Rhythm Boys	"Pull Down The Shade, Marie" / "Cutest Little Dinghy" [DA2155/DA2157]	
1321	Lord Kitchener, Fitzroy Coleman Calypso Band	"The Ashes (Australia v MCC 1955)" / "Utilda" [DA2270/DA 2242 ]	
1322	Ambrose Campbell, West African Rhythm Brothers	"Iwa D' Arekere" / "Ero Ya Kewawo" [DA2303 /DA2306]	
1323	Roaring Lion, Calypso Rhythm Boys	"Highway Code" / "Out De Fire" [DA2278/DA2279]	
1324	Joe Saye Trio	"What Is This Thing Called Love?" / "Quiet Rhythm Blues" [DA2277/]	
1325	Lord Kitchener, Fitzroy Coleman Band	"My Wife's Nightie" / "Sweet Home" [DA2202/DA2199]	
1326	Lord Kitchener's African Jungle Boys, Fitzroy Coleman Band	"My Fancy" / "Kitch In The Jungle" [DA2271/DA2282]	
1327	Ginger Foloronso Johnson	"Mambo Africana Batucada" / "Nightingale"	Afro Cuban and Latin American Rhythm from the Club Contemporain, London
1328	The Mighty Terror, Rupert Nurse's Calypso Band	"No Carnival In Britain" / "Chopping Wood" [DA2265/DA2264]	
1329	King Fighter, Carib-Airs Calypso Band with the Millionairs Trio	"Fast Mouth Men" / "Ah Dream A Dead" [APR1/ APR2]	
1330	Eric Hayden, The Four Tune Tellers	"Love Me Anywhere" / "Dippy Dip" [DA2190/DA2192]	
1331	Tony Johnson and His Carousel Band	"Man Smart, Woman Smarter" / "Give Her Banana" (DA2343/DA2344)	
1332	Tunji Sowande's African Spiritual Rhythm Band	"Ihin Rere" / "Igi T'olorun (The Tree)"	
1333	Lord Beginner, Rupert Nurse Calypso Band	"Sir Winston Churchill " / "Calypso Rhythm Dance (Fed-a-ray)" [DA2360/DA2321]	
1334	Roaring Lion, Caribbean Calypso Rhythm Boys	"Tamborina" / "She Walks Like You And Talks Like You" [DA2281A/DA2215B]	
1335	Lord Kitchener	"Professor Kitchener" / "Mamie Water" [DA2126/DA2272]	
1336	Lili Verona, Rupert Nurse Calypso Boys	"Caribbean Moon" / "The Big Instrument" [ /DA2380]	
1337	George Browne and His Latin Calypso Band	"Sir Winston-Not Out" / "Hernando's Hideaway" [DA2374/DA2375]	
1338	Ambrose Campbell, West African Rhythm Brothers	"Geneva Conference" / "Late Ojo Davies" [DA2370 / DA2372]	
1339	Dai-Dai Simba	"My Coloured Women" / "Modern Telephone"	
1340	The Charmer with The Johnny McCleverty Calypso Boys / Ricardo Rico	"Stone Cold Man" / "Bailen Todos Merengue" [DA2391/] [Monogram/]	
1341	Eric Hayden, Rupert Nurse Calypso Band	"Malumbo" / "Susie"	
1342	West African Rhythm Brothers	"Calabao" / "Y.B Club" [DA2382 /DA2383]	Abiodun Oke (vocals),
1343	Ginger Foloronso Johnson and His Afro-Cuban Latin American Band	"African Highlife" / "Oriental Star"	
1344	Hedley Ward Trio	"Rock Around The Clock" / "Who Dat Up Dere?" [DA2414/DA2415] [1955]	
1345	Lord Kitchener, Fitzroy Coleman Band	"Nigerian Registration" / "African Girl" [DA2410/DA2124]	
1346	Lord Ganda, Rupert Nurse Calypso Band	"Song of Joy" / "The Queen Visits Nigeria" [DA2320/DA2423]	
1347	George Browne And His Calypso Band	"The Ballad Of Davy Crockett" / "Curiosity" [DA2376/DA2377]	
1348	Ambrose Campbell, West African Rhythm Brothers, Abiodun Oke	"Najugbe" /"Lazy Baby, Go Home" [DA2384 /DA2385]	Abiodun Oke (vocals)
1349	Louis Jordan & His Tympany Five	"Messy Bessy" / "I Seen Wat'cha Done" [DA2430/DA2429]	
1350	Lord Kitchener	"The Little Princess" / "Dora (meet me at the pawn shop)"	
1351	Lord Kitchener, Fitzroy Coleman Band	"King Freddie" (HRH The Kabaka) / "January Girls" [DA 2419/]	
1352	Hedley Ward Trio	"Big Ears"/ "Who's Sorry Now?" [DA2443/ DA2444]	
1353	The Charmer (Louis Farrakhan), The Johnny McCleverty Calypso Boys / Eric Hayden, Gulf Stream Calypso Band	"Back To Back, Belly To Belly" (aka "Zombie Jamboree") / "Is She Is Or Is She Ain't?" [DA2431/DA2432] {MONOGRAM}	
1354	Ginger Folorons Johnson & His Afro-Cuban Band	"Kure, Kure" / "Mambo Contempo"	
1355	Johnny Franks Quartet	"Rock Candy Baby" / "Sing-ing-ing"	
1356	George Catino	"I Surrender, Dear" / "Isn't It Romantic?"	
1357	Ambrose Campbell, West African Rhythm Brothers	"Adura" / "Biko"	
1358	Lord Ganda, Rupert Nurse Calypso Band	"Welcome Home, Your Majesty" / "Bo School Jubilee" [ /DA2459]	
1359	Lord Invader, Rupert Nurse Calypso Band	"Mister, Don't Touch Me Bumper" / "Hurricane Connie" [DA2470/DA2471]	
1360	Lord Kitchener, Fitzroy Coleman Band	"Big Toe" / "Woman's Figure" [DA2411/DA2420]	
1361	Roaring Lion, The Calypso Rhythm Boys	"Cheek To Cheek" / "Nigerian Girl"	
1362	George "Young Tiger" Browne	"Kiss Me" / "My Love"	
1363	Russell Henderson Steel Band	"The Irish Washerwoman"/"Mambo Ping-Pong" [DA2476/DA2477]	
1364	Nigerian Union Rhythm Group, leader Abiodun Oke	"I Want To Go Home To Africa" / "Tinuke Alatise" [DA2480/]	
1365	Lord Kitchener, Fitzroy Coleman Band	"Manchester Football Double" / "Nikki the Bear" [DA2488/DA2489]	
1366	Lord Flea, the Blue Mountain Caroleers	"Ol' Fowl" / "Irene and Yo Fr'en'" [AT1 / AT2]	[Calypsodisc CT100] W. Gaynair tenor S. Mullins (piano); C. Johnson (bass); F. Jackson (drums)
1367	Lord Flea, the Blue Mountain Caroleers	"Mister Charlie" /"Baji" [AT5 / AT6]	[Calypsodisc CT102]
1368	Baba Motta St. Jago Dons	"Miss Goosie And Mr Gander" / Baba Motta St. Jago Dons, voc Sir Albert "So She Go" [AT9 / AT10]	
1369	The Mighty Terror, Rupert Nurse Calypso Band	"Romantic Animal/Pompey Calypso" [DA2485/]	
1370	Lord Kitchener, Fitzroy Coleman Band	"Love and hate" / "Oil And Sunshine" [DA2052/DA2303]	
1371	Young Tiger, The Calypso Caroleers	"Davy Crockett Calypso" / "Na Nino"	
1372	Shirley Ryan, Lennie Lewis Band	"Ask For Joe" / "Besame Mucho (Kiss Me)" [DA2490/]	
1373	Lord Ganda, West African Calypso Boys	"Poor Little Monkey" / "Sparkling Groundnuts"	
1374	Adam's African Sky Rockets	"Niger Wrestling Chant" /Adam's Folk Singers - "Okrika Basin"	
1375	Ambrose Campbell, West African Rhythm Brothers	"Oba Adele" /"Funwanitiwa" [DA2466/DA2469]	
1376	Bill Haley & The Comets	"Why Do I Cry Over You?" / "I'm Gonna Dry Every Tear With A Kiss" [DA2506/DA2507]	Actual band name: Bill Haley & His Saddlemen [Atlantic 727 78] Bill Haley (vocals & rhythm guitar); Billy Williamson (steel guitar); Johnny Grande (piano); Bill Borelli (piano); Al Rex (double bass); Jimmy Myers (drums)
1377	Hermanos Deniz Cuban Rhythm Band	"Surprise Samba" / "Siboney" [DA2508 / DA2509]	Guitarist Frank Deniz teamed up with brothers Joe (guitar) and Lawrie (rhythm guitar/percussion).
1378	The Mighty Terror, Rupert Nurse Calypso Band	"Man Know Thyself" / "Give It To Me (Bonweno)" [DA2502/DA2266]	
1379	Brewster Hughes, Nigerian Union Rhythm Group	"Chief Okorodudu" / "Chief Obafemi Awolewo"	
1380	Lord Kitchener, Fitzroy Coleman Band	"12 O'Clock Last Night" / "Short Skirts" [DA2284 /DA2413]	
1381	Roaring Lion, the Calypso Rhythm Boys	"Dorothy Went To Bathe"/"Concertina" [DA2360?/DA2367]	
1382	Lord Beginner, Rupert Nurse Calypso Band	"The Ladies Of Today" / "You Can't Tell The Old From The Young" [DA2361]	
1383	Lila Verona, The Gulf Stream Calypso Boys	"French Lesson" / "Pica Pow" [DA2381/DA2381]	
1384	Lloyd Thomas, Calypso Rhythm Boys	"Sex Changin'" / Fitzroy Coleman Band -"Alley Dog" [DA2523 /DA2060 ]	
1385	Ambrose Campbell, West African Rhythm Brothers	"Kelebeno" / "Asa To Soriko" [DA2468/]	
1386	Frank Virtuoso Rockets	(78 rpm) "Rollin' And Rockin' (We Gonna Rock)" / "Goodbye Mambo" [DA2524/DA2525] (Tone-Craft ?)	
1386	Frank Virtuoso Rockets	(45 rpm) "Rollin' And Rockin'" / "Toodle-OO-Kangaroo" [DA2524/DA2561] (Tone-Craft ?)	Two Rockin tracks originally recorded in 1956 & released in the UK on two different 78s (1386 and 1393). Two years later the tracks were brought together for this 45 in 1958
1387	Hedley Ward Trio	"My Baby's Got Such Loving Ways" / "Steamboat Rock" [DA2538/DA2539]	
1388	Young Kitchener	"Hot Water Bottle" / "Lilian"	
1389	Ambrose Campbell, West African Rhythm Brothers	"Good Luck Ghana" /"Ghana" [DA2541/DA2540 ?]	
1390	Lord Kitchener and his Calypso All-Stars	"Kitch's Mambo Calypso" / "Birth of Ghana (6 March 1957)" [DA2412/DA2557]	
1391	Ambrose Campbell, West African Rhythm Brothers	"Kusimilaya" / "I Walk A Thousand Miles" [DA2553/DA2556]	
1392	Nat Atkins and his Crazy Bees, Leader O.Akinbayo	"Sumogole" / "Tongorotingiri" [DA2551/DA2552]	
1393	Frank Virtuoso Rockets	"Toodle-oo Kangaroo" / "Hop-Skip-Jump Mambo" [DA2561/] (Tone-Craft ?)	(78 rpm)
1394	West African Rhythm Brothers	"Odudua" / "I Am A Stranger"	
1395	Ambrose Campbell, West African Rhythm Brothers	" Oba Ademola 11" / "Lagos Mambo" [DA2555/DA2517]	
1396	Lord Ganda, Rupert Nurse Calypso Band	"Ghana, Forward Forever" / "Nyabondaa A Mu Wuhinte"	
1397	Hermanos Deniz Cuban Rhythm Band	"Angels May Care" / "La Comparsa" [DA2510/]	
1398	Ambrose Campbell, West African Rhythm Brothers	"Oba Tonbasiri" / "I Like Your Face" [DA2543/DA2544]	
1399	Abiodun Oke, Nigerian Union Rhythm Group	"Unity" / "J.K Randle Memorial" [DA25-- /DA2581]	
1400	Lord Kitchener And His Calypso All Stars	"Rock 'n' Roll Calypso" / "Life Begins At Forty"	
1401	Lord Kitchener And His Calypso All Stars	"Romeo" / "Kitch's Calypso Medley" [DA2492/DA2493]	
1402	Enrique Aviles And His Orchestra	"Tan Sabrosana" / "Bombon Cha Cha" [DA2577/DA2578]	
1403	Soho Skiffle Group, leader Jimmy Bryning	"Midnight Special" / "Give Me A Big Fat Woman" (DA2579/)	
1404	George Browne and His Jamaican Calypso Band	"Day-O (Banana Boat Song)" / "Farewell To Jamaica" (DA2597 /DA2599)	
1405	Rans Boi and his African High Life Band	"Fedse" / "Ekome Femo Gana" [DA2592/DA2593]	
1406	Ayinde Bakare and his Meranda Orchestra /Ambrose Campbell, Ayinde Bakare and his Meranda Orchestra	"The Great J.K. Randle" / "Ibikunle Alakija" [DA2602/DA2603]	
1407	Russell Henderson Steel Band	"Rum and Coconut Water" / "Me And Dorothy"	
1408	Ambrose Campbell, West African Rhythm Brothers	"When A Room Is Empty" / "Ajenyia" [DA2542/]	
1409	The Kordites With Ronnie Pleydell Orchestra	"The Green Beret" / "That Old Nine-O-Two"	
1410	Lord Kitchener And His Calypso All Stars	"Deceitful One" / "Excuse Me, Sandra"	
1411	Tommy Sampson And His Strongmen	"Rock 'n' Roll Those Big Brown Eyes" / "Rockin" [DA2605/DA2606]	
1412	Hermanos Deniz Cuban Rhythm Band	"Let's Go Calypso" / "Mambo Hoo" [DA2609/DA2610]	
1413	Johnny Southern, The Western Rhythm Kings	"We Will Make Love" / "Crazy Heart" [DA2629/DA2630]	
1414	Ambrose Campbell, West African Rhythm Brothers	"My Little One" / "Ayami" [DA2614/DA2615]	
1415	George Browne, The Humming Birds	"He Like It, She Like It" / "I Do Adore Her" [DA2633/]	
1416	Lord Invader, Rupert Nurse's Calypso Band	"Goodwood Park" / "Aguiti" [DA2472/DA2473]	
1417	Lord Ganda, West African Calypso Boys	"Everybody Is Rockin' And Rollin'" / "Landlady, Don't Steal My Whiskey"	
1418	Brewster Hughes, Nigerian Union Rhythm Group	"Temptation" / "Sweetie Water"	
1419	Bernard Hunter, Merrick Farran Orchestra	"It's Fun Finding Out About London" / "It's Just For Fools"	
1420	Lord Kitchener, Rupert Nurse Calypso Band	"Poor Man" / "The Dog" [/DA2673]	
1421	Soho Skiffle Group	"Frankie & Johnnie" / "Streamline Train"	
1422	The Ghana Teenagers	"Anidze" /"Amankha"	
1423	Ade Kunle's Highlife Jets	"Ade Mola" / "Marina"	
1424	Ginger Foloronso Johnson & His Afro Cuban Band	"Brown Skin Girl" / "Highlife No. 5"	
1425	Ambrose Campbell, West African Rhythm Brothers	"Atewolara" / "E Majeko Baje"	
1426	Brewster Hughes, Nigerian Union Rhythm Group	"Foo Foo" / "My Baby Boy"	
1427	Hermanos Deniz Cuban Rhythm Band	"Dedicado" / "Bernies Tune" [DA2668/DA2667]	
1428	Nat Atkins And His Crazy Bees	"Omopupa" / "Iyamabamiwi"	
1429	Kings Of Caribbean Steel Band, voc Vivian Comma	"Down In Soho" / "Rock 'n' Roll Susie"	
1430	Lord Kitchener, Rupert Nurse Caribbean Band	"Federation"/ "Alfonso In Town" [DA2709/DA2712] {78-1957/45-1959}	
1431	Ayinde Bakare and his Meranda Orchestra	"Iwa Lewa (Your Manner is Your Beauty)" / "J.O. Majekodunmi" [DA2601/DA2604]	A Bakare (leader, guitar); Akinola (drums); Ojo (maracas); Akanbi (talking drums); Hippolite (meramba)
1432	Ido Martin & His Latin Band	"Fire Down Below" / "Cha Cha Cha Tres" [DA2674/DA2675] from La Club de la Côte d'Azur	Beryl Wayne (vocals)
1433	Cy Grant, Rupert Nurse Caribbean Band	"Lucky Oyster" / "Heavy Weather" [DA2679 /DA2680]	
1434	Johnny Southern & His Western Rhythm Kings	"She's Long, She's Tall" / "Lonesome Whistle"	
1435	Charles Ross Tropicano Orchestra	"Peace On Earth" / "Jamaican Mambo" [DA2690] (Trinidad Carnival Records MG 505)	
1436	Rosita Rosano, San Juan Rhythm Boys	"Queer Things" / "Little Boy" [DA2687/DA2688]	
1437	Norman Grant Orchestra for Dancers	"Stella by Starlight" / "This Can't Be Love"	
1438	Ambrose Campbell, West African Rhythm Brothers	"Morire" / "Ejekamura"	
1439	Adam's African Sky Rockets	"Bonny Bar" / "A Night In Port Harcourt"	
1440	Lord Melody, with the Four Lords, The Caribbean All Stars	"The Devil" / "No, No, No" [Apr76/Apr74] [Trinidad Carnival Records MG 502]	
1441	Bill Huber with Chorus and Orchestra / Bob Grabot Orchestra	"Two Ships" / "His Servant" [DA2699 /DA2700]	
1442	Ambrose Campbell, West African Rhythm Brothers	"Ominira" / "Omo Laso" [DA2691/]	
1443	George Browne, The Humming Birds	"Mary's Boy Child" / "Eden Was Just Like This"	
1444	Ambrose Campbell, West African Rhythm Brothers	"Happy New Year" / "Eye Le Koni"	
1445	Banna Kanuteh, Gambia Highlife Cats	"Kairaba" / "La Bisi"	
1446	Ayinde Bakare and his Meranda Band	"Se Botimo" / "S. Ola Shogbola" [DA2654/DA2655]	
1447	King Sparrow, Caribbean All Stars / Billy Moore, Four Lords And Caribbean All Stars	"Leading Calypsonians" / "Love Is Everywhere" [Apr58/Apr79]	
1448	Doreen Gravesande, Four Lords And Caribbean All Stars	"Lovely" / "Ting-A-Ling"	
1449	Lord Melody, Four Lords And Caribbean All Stars	"Robbery" / "Hen Company"	
1450	Trio Tropicana and Orchestra Cubana	"El Negrito Del Batey" / "Baila Merengue" [DA2713/DA2714]	
1451	Sidney Bechet	"Magic Island Merengue" / "Mayette Merengue" [DA2722 /DA2721]	
1452	Hermanos Deniz Cuban Rhythm Band, leader Frank Deniz	"Chivirico" / "Nicolasa" [DA2666/DA2611]	
1453	The Silver Seas	"Daphne's Be Bop Walking" / "Green Guave"	
1454	Brewster Hughes, Nigerian Rhythm Union Rhythm Group	"Adara Fun Wa" / "Edima Kendi"	
1455	Adam's African Sky Rockets	"Anu Turu Agwa Gwa" / "Je Je Kule"	
1456	Lord Ganda	"Baa Jassi Nya Ma" / "Nya Bondaa A Mu Wuhinte"	
1457	The Hi-Spots	"I Don't Hurt Anymore" / "Lend Me Your Comb" [DA2747/DA2746]	
1458	Steve Arlen, Frank Davis & His Rhythm	"That's Love" / "Easy 'N' Free"	
1459	Johnny Franks	"Good Old Country Music" / "Cheatin' On Me"	Swing violinist Johnny Franks debuts on 18 April 1955.
1460	Lord Kitchener, Rupert Nurse Calypso Band	"Smoke A Cigarette" / "Apple" {1958}	
1461	Young Kitchener, St. Vincent Street Band	"Hyde Park" / "Service Girl"	
1462	Ambrose Campbell, West African Rhythm Brothers	"Ajo Laway" / "Egbe Mi"	
1463	Brewster Hughes, Nigerian Rhythm Union Rhythm Group	"Yaponsa" / "Odeji Akure Oni Of Life"	
1464	The Ghana Teenagers	"Arabina" / "Samba Gombe"	
1465	Ayinde Bakare and his Meranda Orchestra	"Tafawa Balewa" / "Public Interest"	
1466	Tommy Odueso's Akesan Highlifers	"Ibadan Ni Pade" / "Kyo Mano Me"	
1467	Ayinde Bakare and his Meranda Orchestra	"Fagbayi Contractor" / "Adura Fun Awon Aboyun (Prayer for the Pregnant Women)" [DA2660 /DA2661]	
1468	Brewster Hughes, Nigerian Rhythm Union Rhythm Group	"Tajenje" / "The Late Alhaji Adeguke Adelabu"	
1469	Rans Boi's Ghana Highlife Band, Nat Atkins	"Darling, Don't Say No" / "Jolly Orikwa"	Nat Atkins (vocals)
1470	Ade Kunle's High Life Beats	"Olo Mi" / "High Life Blues"	
1471	Willie Payne, Uberu Oni and His Group	"Wa Sise" / "Zik, Awolowo And Sadauna"	
1472	Margrit Sorensen, Klaus Alzner Orchestra / Gert Morrell, Roxy Sisters, Klaus Alzner Orchestra	"Santa Maria" / "The Brave Matador" [DA2780A/DA2781A]	
1473	The Hi-Spots	"Secretly" / "I Got"	
1474	Lord Melody, The Four Lords, The Caribbean All Stars	"Do-Able" / "Happy Holiday" [APR69/APR77]	
1475	King Sparrow, Caribbean All Stars	"Clara Honey Bunch " / "Family Size Cokes " [45/APR56/ 45/APR59]	
1476	Mighty Terror, Rupert Nurse Calypso Band	"I Want A Son" / "Life Is Like A Puzzle" [DA2486]	
1477	Ambrose Campbell, West African Rhythm Brothers	"Awawa" / "Liberty High Life" [DA2453 / DA2512]	
1478	Adam's African Sky Rockets	"Imo" / "Yeriowuambo"	
1479	Cy Laurie Jazz Band	"You Made Me Love You" / "Dippermouth Blues" [DA2802/DA2803]	
1480	Lord Kitchener, West African Rhythm Brothers	"'King' Hogan Bassey" / "Dick Tiger Calypso"	
1481	Rans Boi's Ghana Highlife Band	"Gbo, Ni Mawo" / "Nu Yaka Gbo"	
1482	Edwin Lamptey and Nat Atkins With The Crazy Teenage Band	"Minkpaofai" / "Yaaduma"	Nat Atkins (vocals)
1483	Brewster Hughes, Nigerian Rhythm Union Rhythm Group	"Adesida II" / "J. A. Olubo"	
1484	Billy Sholanke Afro-Cubanos	"Kann Kana" / "The Late Adelabu"	
1485	Steve Rhodes, London Hi-Lifers, Olga Adeniji-Jones	"Oju Rere" / "Drink A Tea" [DA 2826]	Olga Adeniji-Jones (vocals)
1486	Ginger Folorons Johnson	"Bend Down, Pick It Up" / "Bambye Me"	
1487	Ambrose Campbell, West African Rhythm Brothers	"Abo Wa Be" / "Aye Akamara"	
1488	Tommy Odueso's Akesan Highlifers	"Awela" / "Ologbon"	
1489	Tony Johnson and his Caribbean Rhythm	"Monkey Pee-Wee" / "Straighten Up And Fly Right" [DA2342/DA2345]	
1490	The Lion	"Sally Water" / "Sister's Date"	
1491	Lord Melody, Caribbean All Star Band / Mighty Sparrow, Caribbean All Star Band	"Goaty" (aka "John And Goat") / "I Confess" [45/APR57 / 45/APR83] (Trinidad Carnival Records MG 505)	
1492	Ayinde Bakare and his Meranda Orchestra	"Kamila Mustapha" / "Asewo Erori" DA2658 / DA2659	
1493	Brewster Hughes, Nigerian Rhythm Union Rhythm Group	"Hyde Park Baby" / "Ese Pupo"	
1494	Nat Atkins and his Crazy Bees	"Dance Easy" / "Kelele"	
1495	Willie Payne With The Starlite Tempos	"Lady Eko" / "Sugar Kane Mambo"	
1496	Rans Boi's African Highlife Band	"Boi's Da Gamba" / "Mike Bo Yienyo"	
1497	Brewster Hughes, Nigerian Rhythm Union Rhythm Group	"Chief Obafemi Awolowo" / "Chief Rotimi Williams Ojikolobo"	
1498	Lord Kitchener	"Black Puddin'" / "Piccadilly Folk" [DA2823/DA2822] {1958}	
1499	Ginger Foloronso Johnson Afro-Cuban Band	"Kolo Dumare Gdadura-Wa" / "Aworo Yo Yo Cuba" / "Highlife Mambo"	
1500	Johnnie Gray & His Chunks Of Mettle	"Any Old Iron Cha Cha" / "Cocktails For Two Cha Cha" [DA45/2846/ DA45/2847]	
1501	Gordon Franks & His Band	"Farrago" / "Baila Mi Cha Cha" [DA2844 /DA2845]	
1502	Ali Ganda, Rupert Nurse All Stars, Featuring the African Troubadours.	"Bon Voyage" / "H.M Queen Elizabeth and H.R.H. Prince Phillip [sic] Come To Sierra Leone" [/ DA2848 /]	
1503	Lord Melody	"Tom Dooley / Oke Iyake Atiale, Nigerian Union Rhythm Band (Oko Iyawo Atiale)" / "Jealous Woman"	
1504	Lord Melody	"Romeo" / "Knock On Any Door"	
1505	Ambrose Campbell, West African Rhythm Brothers / Rans Boi Ghana Highlife Band	"Ominira" / "Gbonimawo" [DA2691/DA2792]	
1506	Enrique Aviles and His Orchestra	"Maria" / "Si Tu Nola Otra" [DA2864/DA2865] [1961]	
1507	The Fabulous Talbot Brothers	"She's Got Freckles" / "Bloodshot Eyes" [DA2868/DA2869]	On label " ABC Television Ltd presents The Fabulous Talbot Brothers from the Mayfair Hotel "
1508	The Amsterdam Pierement	"Pierement Waltz" / "Amsterdam Polka" [DA2870/DA2871] [1959]	
1509	Rans Boi's Ghana Highlife Band	"Ghana Welcomes The Queen" / "Goodnight"	
1510	Suberu Oni Group	"Awolowo" / "Oluwa Monjade Lo"	
1511	Nat Atkins and his Crazy Bees	"Ire" / "Lina"	
1512	Phil Sullivan with Lonzo & Oscar's Peapickers	"Luckiest Man In Town" / "Love Never Dies" [45/DA2899/45/DA2832] [Starday 45-410]	
1513	Ambrose Campbell, West African Rhythm Brothers	"We Have It In Africa" / "Aye Wa Adara"	
1514	Brewster Hughes, Nigerian Union Rhythm Group	"Gbogbo Africa Enura" / "Isale Ofin"	
1515	Ginger Mofolunsho Johnson & His Afro-Cuban Orchestra	"African Jazz Cha Cha" /"Egyptian Bint Al Cha Cha" [45/DA2901/45/DA2902] [1959]	
1516	Tommy Dee with Teen Tones and Orchestra / Carol Kay and the Teen-Aires*	"Three Stars" / "I'll Never Change" (DA2 909/DA 2910)	*US - with Carol Kay and the Teen-Aires [Crest 45-1057] "Three stars" is a Big Bopper/Ritchie Valens/Buddy Holly tribute.
1517	Joseph McNally With The High Lights And Harold Geller Orchestra / Jean Campbell With The High Lights And Harold Geller Orchestra	"Live and Kicking" / "Liscannon Bay" / "The One I Truly Love" [DA 45/2911 //DA 45/2912]	From the film Alive and Kicking.
1518	Dorothy Masuka, The Kwela Serenaders	"Khauleza" / "Zoo Lake" [DA2913/DA2914] [1959]	
1519	Frankie Miller	"Black Land Farmer" / "True Blue" [DA 45/2927 / DA 45/2928] [Starday 45-424(2049/2050)]	Goldstar Studio, 5628 Brock Street Houston, Tx 1956 (vocals, guitar); Glenn Barber (lead guitar 1); Norman Miller (acoustic guitar, percussion); Jimmy Robinson (stl gtr-2); Henry Bennett (fiddle); Russell Vernon "Hezzie" Bryant (string bass); Jack Kennedy (piano) Producer: William "Bill" Quinn
1520	Ginger Johnson & His Afro-Cuban Band	"Wee Tom Cha Cha" / "Won't You Cha Cha" [DA/45-2917/DA/45-2918]	
1521	Ayinde Bakare and His Meranda Orchestra	"Nigerian Freedom Song" / "Mobe Ru Aya"	
1522	Robert Edet	"Nigeria will be free" / "Lament for Jibowu"	
1523	James Something	"Akorah Anumah" / "Abossa"	
1524	Nat Atkins and His Crazy Bees	"Jekald Si Ilu Eko" / "Fummoliwemi"	
1525	Nigerian Union Rhythm Group, Leader Aboidun Oke	"Omo Jaye-Jaye" / "Obo Oterje" [DA2923]	
1526	West African Rhythm Brothers	"Mofi Ajobi Bayin" / "Iku Koni Payin"	
1527	Lonely Lamptey & His Ghana Teenagers	"Boogie Lubile" /" Awula Atlanta"	
1528	Ali Ganda, The Rupert Nurse Band	"Sarah From Lagos" / "Marie, I'm Mad"	
1529	Frankie Miller	"Poppin' Johnny" / "Family Man" [45/DA 2970 /45/DA 2971] [Starday 45-457 (3025/3028)] {Dec 1959}	Recorded at Bradley Film & Recording Studio in July 1959. Frankie Miller (vocals/guitar); Tommy Hill (rhythm guitar/harmony vocalist 1); Thomas Grady Martin (lead guitar 4/banjo 3); John Robert "Bobby" Garrett (steel guitar 2); Hargus M. "Pig" Robbins (piano); Floyd T. "Lightnin’" Chance (bass); Murrey M. "Buddy" Harman (drums). Producer: John Thomas "Tommy" Hill
1530	Jim Eanes & The Shenandoah Valley Boys	"Christmas Doll" / "It Won't Seem Like Christmas" [45DA/2974/ 45DA/2975] [Starday 45-414] {December 1959}	
1531	Lord Kitchener, Trinidad Calypso All Stars / Lord Kitchener, Rupert Nurse Band	"Women in New York" / "Come Back in the Morning" [DA2711/DA2559]	Seen on eBay 11 November 2014 and 22 October 2025
1531	Lord Kitchener, Rupert Nurse Band	"If You're Brown" / "Come Back In The Morning" [DA2710/DA2559]	
1532	Fela Ransome-Kuti and His Highlife Rakers	"Fela's Special" / "Aigana" (DA2966/DA2967)	
NB	Fela Ransome-Kuti and His Highlife Rakers	"Highlife Rakers Calypso No. 1" / "Wa Ba Mi Jo Bosue" [2968/2969]	Unissued; recorded at the same session as Melodisc 1532 . Fela's First - The Complete 1959 Melodisc Session . Cadillac Records SGCMEL204 . Released 29 Aug 2020 . LP: track 1. Fela's Special / track 2. Alcana / track 3. Highlife Rakers Calypso / track 4. Wa Ba Mi Jo Bosue
1533	Nat Atkins and His Crazy Bees	"Nigeria" / "Mapolode Olabial"	
1534	Rans Boi's Ghana Highlife Band	"Boi's Jive" / "Owume Fatso"	
1535	Abiodun Oke, West African Rhythm Brothers	"Abeni" / "Tortoise Mambo" [DA2851/ DA 2852]	
1536	Enrique Avilez & His Orchestra	"Merenguiando" / "Sin Tambora" [45 DA/2992/45 DA/2993] [December 1959]	
1537	Jack Doyle and the Wimbledon Girls Choir	"On the shores of Bantry Bay" / "In my father's house"	
1538	Victor Soverall with the Zodiacs, Harry Gold and His Music / Victor Soverall, Harry Gold and His Music	"When A Loved One Comes Home" / "Dry Land" (Terra Seca) [DA3009-1/ DA3008-1]	
1539	Rans Boi's Ghana Highlife Band, Nii Tettey Tayeion Rhythm Group	"Highlife comes to Europe" / "Baby Lise's Highlife Rock"	
1541	Ambrose Campbell, West African Rhythm Brothers	"Ema foju ana woku" / "Ye Bobbo" [DA3014 /DA3016]	
1542	Tommy Odueso's Akesan Highlifers	Egbe, Egbe /Adeleke	
1543	Victor Soverall, Harry Gold and His Music with The Zodiacs	Ya Vas Lyu-Blyu/For All These Things [DA3012-1/DA3013-1]	Ya Vas Lyu-Blyu From the Regal International Film: "The Siege of Sidney Street"
1544	Margie Singleton	The Eyes Of Love / Angel Hands [45/DA3020/45/DA3021 ] [Starday 45-472] {1960}	
1545	Merle Kilgore	"Dear Mama" / "Jimmie Bring Sunshine" [45/DA3022/ 5/DA3023] [Starday 45-469] {1960}	"Jimmie Bring Sunshine": Jimmie Davis was elected to Louisiana's governor for the second time in 1960. Merle Kilgore wrote and sang Davis' campaign song. The record sold well enough for Starday to re-release it on their main series and the flip side "Dear Mama" went to Billboard′s country charts peaking at #12 in March 1960.
1546	Lonnie Irving	"Pin-ball Machine" / "I Got Blues On My Mind" [DA3024/DA3025] [Starday 45-486] (3135/3136) {1960}	Producer: Jim Eanes Lonnie's first recording at Radio Station WHEE, Martinsdale, VA, in December 1959 when the flipside "I Got Blues On My Mind" was also recorded. The record was released on US Starday January 1960. Lonnie (vocals); Jim Eanes rhythm guitar Frank Burns electric guitar Arnold Terry rhythm guitar Allen Shelton banjo Cliff Raysdale bass Roy Russell fiddle. His other two records were also recorded at WHEE in May and June 1960 with an unreleased track, "If You Ain't Gonna Love Me".
1547	Mister Acker Bilk & His Paramount Jazz Band	"Goodnight Sweet Prince" / "East Coast Trot" [DA3026/DA3027]	
1548	Rans Boi Ghana Highlife Band	"Gumbo" / "Ibo Ko Etse"	
1549	Lonely Lamptey, the People's Highlife Band	"Gbai Yoo" / "You Made Me Cry"	
1550	Enrique Avilez And His Orchestra	"La Empaliza" / "Merengue A Boriquen" [DA3030/DA3031]	
1551	Bruce Turner Jump Band	"Nuages" / "My Guy's Come Back" [DA3041/DA3042]	Bruce Turner (alto), Johnny Chilton (tpt), Johnny Mumford (tmb), Colin Bates (piano), Bill Bramwell (gtr), Jim Bray ( bass), Johnny Armitage(dms)
1552	Frankie Miller	"Rain, Rain" / "Baby Rocked Her Dolly" [DA3043 /DA3044] [Starday 45-496 (3121/3123)]	Recorded at Bradley Film & Recording Studio, in Tennessee, 18 December 1959. Frankie Miller (vocals/guitar); Tommy Hill (harmony vocals 1/guitar); Thomas Grady Martin (lead guitar); James Clayton “Jimmy” Day (steel guitar 2); Hargus M. “Pig” Robbins (piano 3); Roy M. “Junior” Huskey Jr. (bass); Murrey M. “Buddy” Harman (drums 4); excl (harmony vocals 5). Producer: John Thomas “Tommy” Hill
1553	Hal Paige And The Whalers	"Going Back To My Home" / "After Hours Blues" [DA3045/DA3046] [Fury 1024]	Recorded in New York City, NY, 1956.
1554	Bill Clifton, The Dixie Mountain Boys	"You Don't Think About Me" / "Mail Carrier's Warning" [DA3047/ DA3048] [Starday 45-498] {1960}	
1555	Enrique Aviles And His Orchestra	"La Mujer Puerto Riquena" / "Contigo" [DA3049/DA3050]	
1556	Rans Boi's Ghana Highlife Band	"Darling Come Back to Me" / "Alba Sorit" [DA 2877 / ]	
1557	Ambrose Campbell and West African Rhythm Brothers	"Adewunmi" / "Eri Wo Wo Wo"	
1558	Brewster Hughes, Nigerian Union Rhythm Group	"Omo Ele Po" / "Osuju Emi Wa"	
1559	Buster Brown	" Fannie Mae" / "Lost In A Dream" [DA/45-3057/DA/45-3058] [Fire 1008]	
1560	Fitz Vaughan Bryan's Orchestra with Kentrick Patrick	"Evening News" / "Hold Up Your Head And Smile" [DA3059/DA3060] [CRC]	Kentrick Patrick: vocals
1561	Alain Permal, Mauritius Police Band	"Jolie La Ville Cure-Pipe" / "Danse Dans Moi Les Bras" [DA/45 3061/DA45/3062]	
1562	Cyril Diaz and His Orchestra	"Kingston Merengue" / "Merengue Balasier" [DA3063/DA3064]	
1563	Azie Lawrence, The Carib Serenaders	"Come Rumble And Tumble With Me" / "Jamaica Blues" [DA/45 3065/DA/45 3066]	
1564	Ali Ganda, West African Rhythm Brothers	"Mek We Dance" / "Nigeria Is Free"	
1565	Tejan-Sie And West African Rhythm Brothers	"King Jimmy Foo Foo" / "Guarantee"	
1566	Cowboy Copas	"Alabam" / "I Can" [DA3075/DA3076] (red label) [Starday 45-501] {1960}	
1567	Ambrose Campbell, West African Rhythm Brothers	"Asikoloto" / "Nigeria Odowoyin" [DA3077/ DA3080]	
1568	Ambrose Campbell, West African Rhythm Brothers	"Jekafo Ju Agbawo" / "Nigeria Koniset" [DA3078]	
1569	Enoch & Christy Mensah, Rans Boi Ghana Highlife Band	"Dakuku Drum" / "Rebecca" (DA3087/ DA3088)	
1570	Laurel Aitken, The Bluebeats	"Lonesome Lover" / "Marylee" (DA3084/DA3085) [Downbeat DA3084 /DA3085]	Producer Dada Tewari
1571	Caribbean Swing Band	"Paper Doll" / "You're Free To Go"	
1572	Azie Lawrence, The Carib Serenaders	"You Didn't Want To Know" / "Want To Be In Love" [DA 45/3109/DA 45/3110]	
1573	Dixie Kwankwa, Frank Deniz and His Afro-Cubans	"I Left My Heart in Rhodesia" / "My Nyasaland Love" [DA 45/3111/DA 45/3112]	
1574	Ali Ganda, Carnival Star Orchestra / Carnival Star Orchestra	"Freedom, Freedom, Sierra Leone" / "Independence Carnival" [DA3119/ DA3120] ]	
1575	Tejan-Sie		
1576	Bliff Radie Byne, Ivan Chin and His Rhythm Sextet	"Sierra Leone Victory" / "Independence Merengue" [45/DA3121 /45/DA3122]	Label reads "In the new Asiko Rhythm & Sung in Creo/ Sung in Creo"
1577	Lord Kitchener, Rupert Nurse Band	"Jamaica Turkey" / "Edna, What You Want?" [DA3137/DA3138]	
1578	Bliff Radie Byne, Ivan Chin and His Rhythm Sextet	"Liberia" / "The Children's Jolity" [DA3123/DA3124] (1961)	
1579			
1580	Mel Turner / Mel Turner & the Bandits	"Let Me Hold Your Hand" / "I'll Be With You In Apple Blossom Time" [SJ 45/3177/SJ 45/3178]	
1581	Glen Stuart	"Make Me An Angel" / "Walking To Heaven" [SJ3193/SJ3194] 1961	
1582	Andy Cole, Louis Mordish & His Orchestra with the Rita Williams Singers	"Rainbow Island" / "Contessa" [SJ3248/SJ3249] [1962]	
1583	Victor Coker And His All Stars	"Asewo Eko" /"Ilu Oyinbo Dara" [DA45/3230/ DA45/3231]	
1584	Cab Kaye and His Music From Ghana	"Everything Is Go" / "Don't You Go Away" [45/DA3284 /45/DA2158]	"Kwamlah Quaye Sextetto Africana": Cab Kaye (vocals/conga); Laurie Deniz (guitar); Chris O'Brien (bass); Frank Holder (bongos); Chris Ajilo (clave).
1585	Tudor Evans with Ernst Kugler Orchestra	"Taor Mina" (Festival Prize Winning Song) / "Elena Rosa"	
1586	Johnny Stevens, The Les Dawson Syndicate / The Les Dawson Syndicate	"Oh Yeah" / "Last Chicken In The Shop" [DA3282/DA3283] [1962]	
1587	Enrique Aviles & His Orchestra	"Tarlatane Merengue" / "Conde Dance Merengue" [DA3179/ DA3180]	
1588	Ayinde Bakare & His Meranda Band	"Eko Dara Eko Ndun" / "Rt. Hon. Dr. Azikiwe" [DA3255 / ]	
1589	Los Trovadores	"Siete Notas De Amor" / "Siglo Veinte" [DA 3332 / DA 3333] {1962}	
1590	Ed Daniels & the Seasiders	"Cha Cha Merengue" / "Merengue Bueno" [GO1/GO2]	
1591	Barry Gray & His Spacemakers and Gerry Grant	"Zero G" / "Fireball" [MEL1591A/MEL1591B]	From the TV series Fireball XL5; Gerry Grant (vocals)
1592	Betty Taylor, the Don Lowes Trio	"My Man Has Gone A'Roaming" / "When A Loved One Comes Home" [DA45/3434/DA45/3435] [1963]	
1593	The Nutrons	"Stop For The Music" / "The Very Best Things" [45/BB3555/ 45/BB3556] [1964]	
1594	Lonely Lamptey & the People's Highlife Band, featuring Eddie "Red" Tettey	"Maria" / "Tsie Maa-Sem Yi" (SJ 45/3592/SJ 45/3593) [1964]	
1595	Rhet Stoller	"Treble Gold + One" / "Beat That" [SJ3609/SJ3610]	
1596	Susan Denny	"Don't Touch Me" / "Johnny" [SJ3656/ SJ3657] [1965]	Orchestra accompaniment by Don Lowes
1597	Kim Martyn	"Time To Go Me" /"Stairway To The Sea" [45/SJ/3668-A/ 45/SJ/3669-B]	
1598	Abraham Onyenida, Highlife Bandits	"Nigeria" / "Nwanta Nwanwi" [BB3680-A/BB/3681-B]	
1599	Lilian And Manolis	"Panta Monos (The Lonely)" / “ Tora Omos Pou Se Hano(Now I Lose You " [SJ3706-A /SJ3707-B]	
1600	Enrico and Aviles	"Merengue La Cruz" / "Tapapal'ay Merengue" [BB3693-A/ BB3694-B] {1965}	Actually "Enrique Aviles & His Orchestra"
1601	Hank Durell	"I'll Be Somewhere Listening" / "Born To Be Alone" [BB3734-A/ BB3735-B]	
1602	Lonely Lamptey, the People's Highlife Band, featuring Eddie "Red" Tettey	"Ohe Dzwen Mo Son" / "Tse-Tse Fly Bite" [45/SJ/3590/ 45/SJ/3591] [1965]	
1603	Big Pete Duker	"Walk Right Out Of The Blues" / "Keep A'Movin' On" [45/BB3745/ 45/BB3744]	
1604	Carl Lawson	"My Heart Took A Beating" / "If You Love Her" [45/SJ3779/45/SJ3780] [1965]	
1605	Andreas Michael, Michael Garson Orchestra	"You're Magic To Me "/ "I Shouldn't Love You" [45/SJ3788 /45/SJ3789]	
1606	Ayinde Bakare & The Meranda Orchestra	"O. A. Oreyomi" / "Ile Aye Ile Asan"	
1607	Ambrose Campbell, West African Rhythm Brothers	"Sofo Nu Soki" / "Only Six Feet" [SJ3819]	
1608	Yesufu Adeyemo & His Fabulous Group	"Omo Laso ll" / "Owo Mi Re" SJ3821 / SJ3823	
1609	The Bulgarian Variety Orchestra, conducted by Emil Georgiev	"Bulgarian Betrothal" / "Peaceful and Sunny" [SJ1386 /SJ 1387]	
1610	John Cortez, Lester Perry and His Concert Orchestra	"Torna A Surriento" / "Catari Catari" [SJ 3874 /SJ 3875]	
1611	Laurel Aitken & The Freedom Fighters / The Freedom Fighters	"Guyana Independence" / "Independence Jump"	
1612	Flash Domincii & The Supersonics / Nigerian Union Rhythm Group, leader Abiodun Oki	"Rora Rora Majo Omo Pupa" / "Unity" [BB 3888/BB 3889] {* re-issue of 1399} [1966]	
1613	Eddie Lamptey and His People's Band	"Remember" / "Efie Ayeyie" [SJ3959/ ][1966]	
1614	Gay Emma, Frank Stafford Trio	"Starshine" / "Little Circles" [SJ3969/SJ3970]	
1615	Beryl & Jane, Frank Stafford Trio	"On A Day Like This" / "Thank You Lord" [MEL3987/MEL3988]	
1616	Louis Jordan With The Chris Barber Band	"Is She Is Or Is She Ain't Your Baby?" / "50 Cents" [SJ3975/SJ3976]	Louis Jordan (alto sax, vocals); Chris Barber (trombone, vocals); Pat Halcox (trombone); Ian Wheeler (clarinet, alto sax); Eddie Smith (banjo); Dick Smith (bass); Graham Burbidge (drums). Recorded at Olympic Studios, Barnes 15 December 1962.
1617	Johnny Webb, Bill Shepherd Orchestra & Chorus	"Travellin' Man"/ "Hold Back The Dawn" [SJ 45/4017/ SJ 45/4016 ] (1967)	
1618	Costas Coutrouzas and Mara Liz	"Viati Agapi Me Ponas" / "Manoli Dedes - Penies Toy Manoli" [SJ 45/4011/ SJ 45/4012]	
1619			
1620	Christine Evans	"I'm Gonna Tell Tony" / "Someone In Love" [45-171 / 45-172] [1967]	
1680	Tunde Nightingale And His Highlife Boys	"Alapama Sise" /"Ajo Kodabilile" [DA6001/DA6002] (1969)	
1681	Tunde Nightingale And His Highlife Boys	"Kole Si Se" / "Agbogun Gboro" [DA6003/DA6004] (1969)	
1682	Tunde Nightingale And His Highlife Boys	"Ayaie Akamara" / "Yambons Kelele" [DA6005/DA6006] (1968)	In 1968, Nightingale was contracted for a tour of Europe for four months.
1683			
1684	Ambrose Campbell & All Stars	"Hey Jude" / "Ob-La-Di" [45/MEL1684A /45/MEL1684B] [1969]	Translated into Youba by Ambrose Campbell.

==== Produced for Butlins Holiday Camps, Jazz Series, and Others ====
Number	Artist	Titles	Notes
Melodisc BUT 1	Butlins American Square Dancers / Danny Levan's Tennessee Rakers	"Arkansaw Traveller" / "Three's a Crowd" (MEL323 /MEL327)	Foreword by Basil Brown, Butlins' Director of Entertainments.
Melodisc MEL5004	Brewster Hughes & The Nigerian Union Rhythm Group	Mosalasi Kura / So So Bobo Deen [AS141 A /]	Released in West Africa.
Melodisc SP1	Ambrose Adekoya Campbell's West African Rhythm Brothers	Sing the Blues / Omo Lo' Fu Ja [Mel 171 / Mel 173]	
Melodisc SP2	Ambrose Adekoya Campbell, West African Rhythm Brothers	"Ele da Awa" / "Emi Wa Wa Lowo Re" [MEL172 / MEL174]	Made in 1951; 10in, 78 rpm. Released in West Africa.
Melodisc HI-1	West African Rhythm Brothers, Abiodun Oke	"Calabar-o" / "Y.B Club" [DA2382 /DA2383]	Abiodun Oke: vocals. Released in West Africa.
5001	Pesachke Burstein	"Bei Goyim Hut Men Mazel" (We're Out Of Luck)/ "Shyka Fifer" (Whistling Genius) O.427 / O.428	Jewish Series
5002	Dave Cash / Ich Dank Dir Gott	"Arain Arois" / "As Ich Hob Es Nicht" [MEL0465 / MEL0466]	Jewish Series
5003	Aaron Lebedoff	"Roumania Roumania" (2 Parts) [A300 / A301]	Banner Records. Jewish Series
5004	Moshie Oyster, Sam Madoff Orchestra	"Dus Keshniver Shtickele" / "Greena Bletter" [Mel A324/Mel A325]	Banner Records. Jewish Series
5006	Benny Bell and his music	"Celebration Fraylech" / "Wedding Waltz" [1332B / 390B]	Jewish Series
5010	Sarah Gorby, Robin Laufer Orchestra	"Kossa (Russian) "/ Ben Zion Witler "Djonkoya" [ACP.541 / SUN.1055 ]	Jewish Series
5011	Henri Gerro	"Ich Will Nicht Sein Kein Rebbe" / "Siz Mir Woil" [LS.77 / ]	Jewish Series
5017	Mildred Rosner	Ich Darf Dich Wie A Loch In Kop. / Gefilte Fish	Jewish Series
5018	Benny Bell	"Benny Bell Blesses A Bride" / "Misfortune What Do You Want?"	Jewish Series

==== Melodisc Presents New Jazz ====
Number	Artist	Titles	Notes
1120	Fats Navarro Quintet "Go" / "Stop"	[JRC36/JRC38]	
1121	J.J. Johnson All Stars/ Don Lanphere Quartet	"Teapot" / "Spider's Webb" [602A/JRC32]	
1122	J.J. Johnson Allstars / Stan Getz & Terry Gibbs New Jazz Stars	"Afternoon In Paris" / "Cuddles" [600A /JRC15]	

=== EPs ===
Number	Artist	Titles	Notes
EPM7-51	Sidney Bechet With Humphrey Lyttelton And His Band	"Who's Sorry Now?"; "Sleepy Time Down South"; "I Told You Once, I Told You Twice"; "Georgia"	
EPM7-52	Bunk Johnson With Ernestine Washington	"Where Could I Go But To The Lord?"; "God's Amazing Grace"; "Does Jesus Care"; "The Lord Will Make A Way Somehow"	Jazz band. Sister Ernestine B Washington (vocals)
EPM7-53	Christie Brothers Stompers	"All of Me"; "East End Blues"; "Them There Eyes"; "'S Wonderful"	
EPM7-54	Tito Rodrigues Orchestra / Sonny Rossi Mambo Orchestra	"Mambo Time "; "Mambo San Juan"; "Virgin Isle Mambo"; "Dansero"; "Sing Sing (Mambo)"	
EPM7-55	Lizzie Miles	Ace In The Hole: "Ace In The Hole"; "I Cried for You"; "Careless Love"; "Basin Street Blues"	
EPM7-56	Tony Parenti And His Basin Street Quartet	"I Use To Love You"; "Cecilia"; "Louisiana"; "Baby, Won't You Please Come Home"	Sleeve credits "Tony Parenti And His Basin Street Quartet", label "Tony Parenti And His New Orleans Quartet".
EPM7-57	Armand Hug Quartet	"I'm Sorry I Made You Cry"; "Please Don't Talk About Me When I'm Gone"; "Singing The Blues"; "Alice Blue Gown"	
EPM7-58: Eddie Calvert Plays Latin American	Eddie Calvert And His Rumba Band	"Miserlou; "Hora Samba"; "Gypsy Lullaby"; "Son Mambo"	
EPM7-59	The Crane River Jazz Band Featuring Ken Colyer	"Eh La Bas"; "Just A Closer Walk With Thee"; "Dauphin Street Blues"; "Just A Little While To Stay Here"	
EPM7-60	Raymond Burke And His New Orleans Jazz Band	"Over The Waves"; "Blues For Joe"; "Bill Bailey, Won't You Please Come Home?"; "Sundown"	
EPM7-61	The Lennie Lewis Five	"Modern Party Sound"	
EPM7-62	Muggsy Spanier With Sidney Bechet	Bechet-Spanier Big Four: "China Boy"; "Four or Five Times"; "Squeeze Me"; "Sweet Sue", "Just You"	
EPM7-63	Leadbelly	"How Long Blues"; "Good Morning blues"; "Good Night, Irene"; "Ain't You Glad?"	
EPM7-64: The Folk Songs of John Runge	John Runge	"Old Daddy Fox"; "Come Again, Sweet Love"; "Man is For The Woman Made" / "Foggy Dew"; "Soldier, Soldier"; "Have You Seen But A White Lily Grown"	
EPM7-65: Big Bill Blues	Big Bill Broonzy	"Keep Your Hands Off"; "Stump Blues"; "Five Foot Seven"; "Plough Hand Blues"	
EPM7-66	Louis Jordan & His Tympany Five	Rock and Roll "I Seen What'cha Done"; "Whisky Do Your Stuff"; "Messy Bessy"; "Dad Gum Ya Hide, Boy"	
EPM7-67: Calypso Time	Lord Kitchener & his Calypso All Stars / Lord Kitchener, Fitzoy Coleman Band / Sterling Bettancourt, Wizard of the Ping Pong with Russell Henderson Steel Band / The Mighty Terror, The Rupert Nurse Calypso Band	"Kitch's Mambo Calypso" / "Muriel and the Bug" / "Ping Pong Samba" / "Chinese Children"	
EPM7-68	Bechet-Spanier in New York / Bechet-Lyttelton in London: Bechet-Spanier Big Four / Sidney Bechet With Humphrey Lyttelton And His Band	"If I Could Be With You"; "That's A Plenty"; "Some Of These Days"; "Black And Blue"	
EPM7-69: Beryl Sings, Fatty Plays	Beryl Bryden and Fatty George's Jazz Band	"Beale Street Blues"; "Frankie and Johnny"; "Old Man Mose"; "Doctor Jazz"; "West End Blues"; "Kitchen Man"	Fatty George (clarinet); Oscar Klein (trumpet); Willy Meerwald (trombone); Bill Grah (piano); Hrinz Grah (bass); Bob Blumenhoven (drums) Recorded at Fatty's Jazz Club, Vienna, Austria
EPM7-70: The Origins of Traditional Jazz	George Webb's Dixielanders	"Dippermouth Blues"; "Riverside Blues"; "New Orleans Bop Scop Blues"; "Come Back, Sweet Papa"	
EPM7-71	Cy Laurie Jazz Band	"You Made Me Love You"; "Dippermouth Blues"; "Lonesome Blues"	
EPM7-72	Soho Skiffle Group	"Streamline Train"; "Frankie and Johnny"; "I shall not be moved"; "Give me a big fat woman"	
EPM7-73	Wally Peterson	"Twelve Minutes with Wally Peterson "; "Summertime in Venice "; ?;" Little Boy Fishing"; 'The Surrey with the fringe on top"	
EPM7-74	Rosita Rosano	A Little Bit of Spice: "Admiral's Daughter"; "Cutest Little Dinghy"; "Down in the Indies"; "Pull Down the Shade, Marie"	
EPM7-75: Jazz-Calypso With The Caribbean Swing Band	Caribbean Swing Band	"I Remember April"; "Jor Dhu"; "Salt Lane Girl"; "Linstead Market"	Led by Chris O'Brien.
EPM7-76	Dick Charlesworth Jazz Band	Clubland Jazz: "Marie"; "Canal Street Blues"; "That's When I'll Come Back to You"; "Creole Song"	
EPM7-77: The Music of Huddie Ledbetter	Leadbelly	"Rock Island Line"; "On a Monday"; "Old Riley"; "John Henry"	
EPM7-78: A Tribute To Leadbelly	Pete Seeger	"Kisses Sweeter Than Wine"; "In The Evening"; "Go Down, Old Hannah"; "Winnsboro' Cotton Blues"	
EPM7-79: In Meringue Mood	Sidney Bechet	"Mayette Meringue"; "Souls Les Palmiers"; "Magic Island Meringue"; "Tropical Mood Rhumba"	
EPM7-80: Drum Solos	"Baby" Dodds	"Maryland"; "Tom-Tom Work Out"; "Spooky Drums"; "Rudiments With Drumstick Nerve-Beat"	
EPM7-81	Cy Laurie Jazz Band	"Weeping"; [unrecognized] / "Bow Tie Breakdown" / "Cootie Stomp"	
EPM7-82: Blues By Leadbelly	Leadbelly	"See See Rider"; "Pig Meat"; "TB Blues"; "Man Going Around Taking Names"	Leadbelly sings and talks about the blues.
EPM7-83: Me and Sonny	Sonny Terry and Brownie McGhee	"Me and my dog", Terry; "Secret moto blues", Terry; "Silver fox chase", McGhee; "South Bound Express", McGhee	
EPM7-84: Woody Guthrie Sings	Woody Guthrie	"'Ranger's Command"; "Hard Ain't It Hard"; "Ain't Gonna Be Treated This A-Way"; "Buffalo Skinners"	
EPM7-85: Woody Guthrie Sings	Woody Guthrie	"Worried Man Blues"; "Poor Boy"; "Gypsy Davy"; "More Pretty Girls Than One"	
EPM7-86	Various Artists (Cuban Cha Cha Orchestras)	Let's Dance The Cha Cha Cha; Cojele Bien El Compas; Rhumba En Cha Cha Cha; Cuban Trolly Cha Cha Cha; Cha Cha Majesty	
EPM7-87: Party Songs And Plays By Leadbelly	Leadbelly	"Christmas Song"; "Ha Ha This-A-Way"; "Little Sally Walker"; "Red Bird"	
EPM7-88: Alan Lomax Sings Songs From Texas	Alan Lomax	"Ain' No Mo' Cane On This Brazis"; "Long Summer Day"; "I'm A Rambler And A Gambler"; "The Red River Shore"	Alan Lomax (vocals and guitar); Guy Caravan, banjo John Cole, harmonica
EPM7-89	Cy Laurie Jazz Band	"Old Miss Rag"; "Memphis Shake"; "Froggie Moore Rag"	
EPM7-90: West African Highlife Bands	Ambrose Campbell, West African Rhythm Brothers, Rans Boi's Ghana Highlife Band, West African Rhythm Brothers, Ayinde Bakare and his Meranda Orchestra	"Nejugbe"; - "Gbonimao"; "Ominira"; "Iwa Lewa"	Abiodun Oke (vocals)
EPM7-91: Woody Guthrie Sings	Woody Guthrie	"Hey Lolly Lolly"; "Lonesome Day"; "John Henry"; "Pretty Boy Floyd"	
EPM7-92	Gabor Radics and his Family Orchestra Wandering Gypsies	"Gypsy Serenade"; "Roumanian Medley"; "Czardas Sentimentale"; "Moldavian Dances"	
EPM7-93	Mister Acker Bilk And His Paramount Jazz Band, Volume 1	"All The Girls (Like The Way I Walk)"; "Franklin Street Blues"; "Bye And Bye"; "St. Phillip Street Breakdown"	Acker Bilk (clt), Bob Wallis (tpt), Keith Ainson (tmb), John R T Davies (alto sax), Jay Hawkins (bjo), John Macey (bass), Viv Carter (dms) . Recorded at Metro Club, London .
EPM7-94	Mister Acker Bilk And His Paramount Jazz Band, Volume 2	"Goodnight, Sweet Prince"; "Breeze"; "Travelling Blues"; "East Coast Trot"	
EPM7-95: Let's Dance The Merengue!	Enrique Aviles and his Orchestra	"Baila Meringue"; "Maria"; "Mayaguez"; "Meringue No. 1"	
EPM7-96	Les Perry And His Sequence Orchestra, Volume 1	"The Caledonians, Parts 1-3 "; "The Caledonians, Parts 4 and 5"; "Knights of the Thistle"	
EPM7-97	Les Perry And His Sequence Orchestra, Volume 2	"Imperial Waltz Quadrilles, Parts 1 And 2"; "Imperial Waltz Quadrilles, Parts 3 And 4"; "The Golden Valse"	
EPM7-98	Les Perry And His Sequence Orchestra, Volume 3	"Tango Engano"; "Bell Tango"; "When Day Is Done"; "The Call Of The Angelus"	
EPM7-99	Butlin's Square Dancers	"Virginia Reel"; "Soldier's Joy"; "Butlin's Reel"; "Rakes Of Mallow"	
EPM7-100 Jazzin' International with Paddy Lightfoot	The Jazzopators	"Tinroof Blues"; "Royal Garden Blues"; "Little White Lies"; "Farewell Blues"	
EPM7-101	Mister Acker Bilk And His Paramount Jazz Band, Volume Three	"Gladiolus Rag"*; "Darkness On The Delta"**; "Swing Low, Sweet Chariot"***; "Careless Love" ***	* Acker Bilk (clt), Bob Wallis (tpt), Keith Ainson (tmb), Jay Hawkins (bjo), John Macey (bass), Viv Carter (dms) . ** Acker Bilk (clt), John R T Davies (alto sax), Jay Hawkins (bjo), John Macey (bass), Viv Carter (dms) . *** Acker Bilk (clt and voc), Bob Wallis (tpt), Johnny Mortimer (tbn), Jay Hawkins (bjo), Ernie Price (bass), Ron McKay (dms)
EPM7-102: Blue River Hoedown. Authentic Country and Western	Jim Eanes and Bill Clifton and the Dixie Mountain Boys	Jim Eanes "Road Walked by Fools" (Eanes); "Orchids of Love" (Eanes); "I'll wander back some day" (Clifton, Dixie Mountain Boys); "Corey" (Clifton, Dixie Mountain Boys)	
EPM7-103	Los Trovadores	"Ay Chevala"; "Campensina"; "Besame Morenita"; "Eco de mi Canto"	
EPM7-104: Ragtimers Vol. 1	Muggsy Spanier & Pee Wee Russell	"Muskogee Blues"; "Since my best girl turned me down"; "Red hot Mama"; "I'd climb the highest mountain"	
EPM7-105: Jazz At It's [sic] Best	Ken Colyer, Christie Brothers, Monty Sunshine, Pat Hawes With The Crane River Jazz Band	"Down By The River Side"; "Blanche Touquatoux"; "Black Cat"; "Creole Song"	
EPM7-106	Mr. Acker Bilk And His Paramount Jazz Band, Volume Four	"Shine"; "King Joe"; "Postman's Lament"	Acker Bilk (clt), Bob Wallis (tpt), Keith Ainson (tmb), John R T Davies (alto sax), Jay Hawkins (bjo), John Macey (bass), Viv Carter (dms) . Recorded at Metro Club, London .
EPM7-107: Boogie Woogie And Blues	Meade Lux Lewis	: "Glendale Glide"; "Boogie Tidal"; "Randini's Boogie"; "Yancey's Pride"	
EPM7-108	Art Tatum Trio	"Soft Winds"; "If I Had You"; "Sweet And Lovely"; "Fine And Dandy"	
EPM7-109	George Jones	Country Song Hits: "Why Baby Why"; "Play It Cool"; "You Gotta Be My Baby"; "Hold Everything"	
EPM7-110	Burl Ives	"The Blue Tail Fly"; "Henry Martin"; "Foggy Foggy Dew"; "The Sow Took The Measles"; "Poor Wayfaring Stranger"	
EPM7-111	Harry And Jeanie West	Southern Mountain Folk Songs: "The Soul Of Man"; "The Old Arm Chair"; "My Home Is Across The Blue Ridge Mountains"; "George Collins"	
EPM7-112: Steve Benbow Sings English Folk Songs	Steve Benbow	"Turpin Hero"; "Go Down You Murderer, Go Down"; "The Ballad Of Little Musgrave And Lady Barnard"; "A Boy's Best Friend"	
EPM7-113	Inez Cavanagh and the Jazzopators	"Do You Know What It Means?"; "Sweet Lorraine"; "Whiskey Blues"; "Bei Mir Bist Du Schoen"	
EPM7-114	Sydney Bechet	"Sister Kate"; "Rosa Rhumba"; "Ba ba"; "Fidgety Feet"	
EPM7-115: The Best Of Blue Grass	The Country Gentlemen, Buzz Busby, Williams Brothers, Bill Browning	"The Devil's Own" (Country Gentlemen); "Talking Banjo" (Busby); "Old Birmingham Jail" (Williams Brothers); "Country Strings" (Browning)	
EPM7-116: Bob Wallis and the Storyville Jazzmen: Bob Wallis Meets Mr. Acker Bilk At The New Orleans Jam Session	Bob Wallis, Acker Bilk	"Do What Ory Say"; "In Gloryland" *; "Running Wild"	Bob Wallis (trumpet and vocals), John R T Davies (trombone and alto sax), Les Wood (clarinet), Pete Gresham (piano), Hugh Rainey (banjo), Johnny Macey (bass), Ginger Baker (drums) . * Plus Acker Bilk (clarinet), Pere Crumpton, (baritone sax).
EPM7-117: Cool Jazz With Joe	The Joe Harriott Quartet	"Summertime"; "April In Paris"; "Cherokee"; "Out Of Nowhere"	
EPM7-118	Isy Geiger and his Orchestra (with Sally Bazely and Dennis Sears)	Romantic Love Songs: "Let Us Make Love"; "Love is the Thing"; "Your Wish is My Wish";"Someone in Love"	
EPM7-119			
EPM7-120	S.W. German Light Broadcasting Orchestra	"Dernier Cri ": "La Grande Folie (Polka)"; "Le Fiacre (Intermezzo)"; "Champagne Waltz (Intermezzo)"; "Costa Rica (Rhumba)"	Conducted by Willy Stech.
EPM7-121	Les Perry and His Sequence Orchestra Vol. iv	"Goodbye my love ";"Lamennto Argentino" /"Dubbio"; (vocalist : Kay Wilson)/" To see her is to love her"; "Twilight"; "Forbidden Fruits";(vocalist :Don Rivers) (SE3240 /SE3241) / Tango Quadrilles: "Forbidden Fruit"; "Twilight"; "San Luis"; "Bell" (SE3285 /SE3286)	Two releases.
EPM7-122	Les Perry And His Sequence Orchestra Vol. v		
EPM7-123	Les Perry And His Sequence Orchestra Vol vi	"Oporto"; "Anina"; "The Light Horse"; "Masaryk"	
EPM7-124	Les Perry And His Sequence Orchestra Vol vii	"Lovely Morning"; "Evening Leisure"; "Imperial Britain"; "Liberia"	
EPM7-125: Billie Holiday Memorial Album	Billie Holiday	"Embraceable You"; "I Love My Man"; "As Time Goes By"; "I'm Yours" (April 1963)	
EPM7-126	Les Perry Old Time Orchestra	" The Lancers": "The Royal Hibernians" / "The Royal Hibernians"	Five unidentified Irish tunes - three on side one, two on side two.
EPM7-127: Federation	Trinidad All Star Steel Band		
EPM7-128 Music From Oil Drums	Trinidad All Star Steel Band	"Tattle Tale"; "Maria"	
EPM7-129	Les Perry And His Sequence Orchestra	" Barn Dance." Honeysuckle, I Took Him Up, Early In The Morning, Roamin' In The Gloamin', Ukelele Lady, Wooden Hut, Flanagan, Waiting At The Church / "More Tangos". Jealousy, Isle of Capri	
EPM7-130: Correct Tempo Old Time Dancing	Les Perry And His Sequence Orchestra	"My Favourite Things"; "Edelweiss"; "Laendler"; "Oldie Medley - Gold And Silver", "Sobra La Olas"; "The Latchford Schottische"; "The Gayford Scottische".	On sleeve artist is Les Perry and his Old Time Orchestra.
MLSB 1: Swing Your Partner - Authentic American Square Dances	Butlin's American Square Dancers, Danny Levan's Tennessee Rakers, Butlins Chief Caller Wally Goodman	EP 1 "Big Deal"; "Rakes Of Mallow"; "Split the Ring"; "Virginia Reel"; EP 2 "Ragtime Annie" / "Soldiers Joy" / "Fall Back Six" / "Butlin's Reel" EP 3"Left Handed Indian Jig"; "Devil's Dream"; "Dip And Dive"; "Birdie In The Cage" || Special 3 EP Set	

=== LPs ===
==== 10" ====
Number	Artist	Titles	Notes
MLP 500: Kitch, King Of Calypso Volume One	Lord Kitchener And His Calypso All Stars	"Wife And Mother"; "Red Head"; "My Wife's Nightie"; "Kitch Takes It Easy"; "Woman's Figure"; "Muriel & The Bug"; "Is Trouble"; "Too Late Kitch"	
MLP 501: Wild Bill Davison, Volume 1	Wild Bill Davison	"South"; "Wild Bill Blues"; "Goody Goody"; "When The Saints Go Marching In"; "Wolverine Blues"; "I Can't Give You Anything But Love"; "Everybody Stomp"	
MLP 502: Jazz at Storyville	Johnny Windhurst, Vic Dickenson, Edmond Hall, George Wein, Johnny Field (bass), Jo Jones (drums)	"Struttin' With Some Barbecue"; "I Wish I Could Shimmy Like My Sister Kate"; "'S Wonderful"; "Sweet and Lovely"	Johnny Windhurst (trumpet); Vic Dickenson (trombone); Edmond Hall (clarinet); George Wein (piano); Johnny field (bass); Jo Jones (drums)
MLP 503 "Sharkey and his Kings of Dixieland '	Sharkey and his Kings of Dixieland	Introduction and Farewell Blues; Tin Roof Blues; She's Crying For Me Blues; Muskrat Ramble;I'm Goin' Home; High Society	Joseph Gustaf "Sharkey" Bonano (9 April 1904 – 27 March 1972)
MLP 504	George Lewis's Rhythm Boys / Paul Barbarin's New Orleans Jazz Band	"Put on your old grey bonnet" (Barbarin); "Bourbon Street Parade" (Barbarin); "Walk Through The Streets Of" (Lewis); "I Wish I Could Shimmy Like My Sister Kate" (Barbarin); "Red wing" (Lewis); "Closer Walk With Thee" (Barbarin)	
MLP 505: Playtime in Paris	Bill McGuffie Trio	"La Mer"; "C'est si bon"; "Boom!"; "Moulin Rouge"; "Louise"; "April In Paris"; "Clopin Clopant"; "There Was a Time"	Bill McGuffie (piano); Jack Collier (bass); Jock Cummings (drums)
MLP 506: New Orleans Jazz	Papa Celestin and his New Orleans Band	"Down by the Riverside"; "When the Saints Go Marching In"; "Marie La Veau"; "Oh, Didn't He Ramble?"	
MLP 507: Calypso Carnival	Lord Kitchener, George Brown, Eric Hayden, The Lion, The Charmer, Little Nora, The Mighty Terror, Tony Johnson	"Big Toe" (Kitchener); "Single Man" (Brown); "Give her the No.1" (Hayden); "Come punskie" (Lion); "Stone Cold Man" (Charmer); "(Don't Touch Me) Tomato" (Nora); "Chinese Children" (Terror); "Man Smart, Woman Smarter" (Johnson)	
MLP 508: Contemporary Mood	Ginger Folorunso Johnson And His Afro-Cuban Band *, Lionel Kerrien And His Band **	Mambo Contempo *; Soho Stomp**; African Highlife *; Mayfair Blues ** / Fernando Cha Cha *; Strand Rag **; Honey Maid *; Chelsea Choice **	Guest Vocals – George Browne . "Fernand Calvet Presents Contemporary Moods from Le Club Contemporain, Mayfair, London"
MLP 509: He Like It, She Like It	George Browne Calypso Band and The Humming Birds	"Origin of Calypso"; "Mary Anne"; "Farewell to Jamaica"; "Fox"; "Day-O (Banana Boat Song)"; "He Like It, She Like It"; "I Do Adore Her"; "Rum and Coca Cola"	
MLP 510: Kitch, King Of Calypso Volume Two	Lord Kitchener And His Calypso All Stars	"Excuse Me, Sandra"; "Life Begins At Forty"; "Kitch"; "Romeo"; "Marjorie's Flirtation"; "Rebound Wife"; "Nosey Mother-in Law"; "Short Skirts"	
MLP 511: Leadbelly Memorial Album, volume 1	Leadbelly, Sonny Terry, John Henry	"Rock Island Line"; "Goodnight, Irene"; "How Long, How Long Blues"; "On A Monday"; "Ol' Riley"; "Ain't You Glad"; "Good Morning Blues"	
MLP 512	Leadbelly Memorial Album, volume 2	"Meeting at the Building; "Talking Preaching"; "We Shall Walk Through the Valley"; "Cow Cow Yicky Yicky Yea"; "Out on the Western Plains";" Fiddler's Dram"; "Yellow Gal"; "Green Corn"; "Noted Rider"; "Big fat woman"; "Burrow Love and Go"; "Bring Me L'il Water, Silvy"; "Julie and Johnson"; "Line 'em"; "Out on the Western Plains"; "Whole Back, Buck"; "John Hardy"	
MLP 513			
MLP 514	Jazz Dance.	" Jazz me Blues"; "Ballin' the Jack"; "Royal Garden Blues"; "When the Saints Go Marchin' In".	Jimmy Archey (trombone); Jimmy McPartland (trumpet), Pee Wee Russell (clarinet), Willie "The Lion" Smith (piano); Pops Foster (bass); George C. Wetttling (drums) Music from the soundtrack: Jazz Dance.
MLP 515	Leadbelly Memorial Album volume 3	The Boll Weevil; Ain't Going Down To The Well No Mo - Go Down Old Hannah; Frankie and Albert; Fannin Street; The Bourgeois Blues; Looky Looky Yonder-Black Betty-Yellow Women's Door Bells; Poor Howard-Green Door; The Gallis Pole; De Kalb Women	
MLP 516: Whoopin' the Blues	Sonny Terry	"Don't you hear me calling you"; "Silver fox chase"; "Worried and lonesome blues"; "Greyhound bus station" /"She is a sweet woman"; "South bound express"; "You don't want me blues"; "Tell me little woman"	
MLP 517: Party Songs by Leadbelly	Leadbelly	"More Yet"; "How old are you"; "Green grass growing all around"; "Skip to my Lou"; "It's almost day"; "Little children's blues"; "You can't lose me, Cholly"; "Little Sally Walker"; "Ha Ha this-a-way"; "Red bird"; "What are little boys made of"; "All for you"; "Polly Polly Polly Wee"; "How do you know?"; "Don't mind the weather"; "Skip to my Lou"	
MLP 518: Authentic African Highlife Music	Ayinde Bakare & His Meranda Band, West African Rhythm Brothers, Adiodun Oke, Nat Atkins & His Crazy Bees, Nigerian Union Rhythm Group, Ambrose Campbell, Rans Boi's Ghana Highlife Band	"Iwa Lewa" (Bakare); "Calabar-o" (Rhythm Brothers, Oke); "Somojele" (Atkins); West African Rhythm Brothers, voc Adiodun Oke - "Eroya Kewawo" (Rhythm Brothers); "Ojitibi" (Nigerian Union); "Omo Laso" (Campbell, Rhythm Brothers); "Fedse" (Boi); "Y.B Club" (Rhythm Brothers, Oke); "Ghana" (Rhythm Brothers, Oke); "The late J K Randle" (Bakare)	Adiodun Oke (vocals)
MLP 519: Famous West African Highlife Bands, volume 2	Rans Boi's Ghana Highlife Band, Nat Atkins And His Crazy Bees, Ambrose Campbell, West African Rhythm Brothers, Ayinde Bakare and his Meranda Orchestra, Tommy Odueso's Akesan Highlifers, Nigerian Union Rhythm Group, Steve Rhodes, London Hi-Lifers	"Darling, don't say no" (Boi, Atkins); "Omo Laso" (Campbell, Rhythm Brothers); "Sebotimo" (Bakare); "Omo pupa" (Atkins); "Ibadan na pade" (Odueso); "Ojikolobo" (Nigerian Union); "Adurafunawonaboyun" (Campbell, Rhythm Brothers); "Ojurere" (Rhodes, Hi-Lifers)	

==== 12" ====
Number	Artist	Titles	Notes
MLP 12-101: New Orleans Parade	George Lewis leading the Eureka Brass Band	"Sing on"; "West Lawn Dirge"; "Lady Be Good"; "Garlands of Flowers"	
MLP 12-102: Music from Steel Drums. Authentic Trinidad Steel Bands	Brute Force Steel Band, Esso Steel Band	Brute Force Steel Band : West Indies Serenade; "Mambo Jumbo"; "Ping Pong Bounce"; "Antigua Scenery"; "Song Of The Caribbean"; "Coconuts" / Esso Steel Band: "Schubert's Serenade"; "Mambo Espaniol"; "Teena Come Back"; "Brown Skin Girl"; "Sageway Samba"; "La Comparsita"	
MLP 12-103: Merrick Farron Symphony Orchestra: Symphonic Variations On a Rock and Roll Theme	Merrick Farron Symphony Orchestra	"Symphonic Variations On a Rock 'N Roll Theme (Rock Around the Clock)"; "Symphonic Variations On a Rock 'N Roll Theme (Rock Around the Clock)"	
MLP 12-104: Wandering Gypsies	Gabor Radics and his Family Orchestra	"Gypsy Serenade"; "Vienna Serenade"; "Forest Dance"; "Czardas Sentimentale"; "Roumanian Dance- Doina"; "Old Gypsy"; "Yablotchko-Kalitka"; "Song of the Volga Boatmen"; "Two Guitars- Dark Eyes"; "Troika - On the Black Sea"; "Moldavian Dances"	
MLP 12-105: Bird At St. Nicks	Charlie Parker	"Ornithology"; "Too Many Girls", "I Didn't Know"; "I Cover the Waterfront"; "Embraceable You"; "I'm Free"; "Scrapple from the Apple"; "Now's the Time"; "Confirmation"; "Star Eyes"; "Hot House"; "Smoke Gets in Your Eyes"; "Out of Nowhere"; "Visa"; "Embraceable You"; "I Didn't Know What Time it Was"	1955, 15-track deep groove mono LP pressed on heavyweight vinyl with dark green & silver Melodisc labels. Tommy Potter (bass); Red Rodney (trumpet); Al Haig (piano); Roy Haynes (drums). Recorded 18 February 1950:
MLP 12-106: Memorial To Woody Guthrie and Cisco Houston	Woody Guthrie, Cisco Houston	"Take A Whiff On Me"; "Bad Lee Brown"; "The Golden Vanity"; "Cumberland Gap"; "Sourwood Mountain"; "Old Time Religion" / "Columbus Stockade"; "Johnny Hard"; "Foggy Mountain Top"; "Bury Me Beneath the Willow"; "Skip To My Lou"; "Ezekiel Saw The Wheel"	Also released as More Songs by Woody Guthrie and Cisco Houston
MLP 12-107: Leadbelly	Leadbelly, Willie Smith, Brownie McGhee, Pops Foster, Sonny Terry	"Digging My Potatoes"; Leadbelly - "Leadbelly's Dance"; "You Don't Miss Your Water"; "Black Girl"; "Blind Lemon"; When The Sun Goes Down"; "Alberta"	Leadbelly (vocals/guitar); Willie Smith (piano); Brownie McGhee (guitar); Popos Foster (bass); Sonny Terry (harmonica)
MLP 12-108: Ay Caramba!	Antobal's Cuban All Stars	"It's the Bururu"; "Mambo in F"; "I'm on my way"; "Have you seen my love?*"; "Cuban Capers"; "Keep away senores, keep away"; "Washerwoman"; "Ay Caramba Cha Cha*"; "An old balcony"; "Mambo habanero"; "Olele"; "Meet Bembo"	USA: London Records LL3056
MLP 12-109: Saga of Leadbelly	Leadbelly	"Grey Goose"; "Red Cross Store Blues"; "Ham and Eggs"; "Red River in the Pines"; "You Don't Miss Your Water"; "Blind Lemon"; "Leadbelly's Dance"; "In the evening when the sun goes down"; "Diggin' my potatoes"; "Alberta"	
MLP 12-110: Music Of New Orleans, Volume 2	Eureka Brass Band	"Panama"; "Trombonium"; "Just a Little While to Stay Here"; "Lord, Lord, Lord You Sure Be"; "Eternity"; "Maryland, My Maryland"	Members: Percy Humphrey, Willie Pajeaud & 'Kid Sheik' Cola (trumpets); Sonny Henry & Albert Warner (trombones); Ruben Roddy (alto saxophone); Emanuel Paul (tenor saxophone); Joseph Clark (tuba); Alfred Williams (snare drum); Robert Lewis (bass drum)
MLP 12-111: Memorial Album	Billie Holiday	"Yesterdays"; "I Gotta Right To Sing The Blues"; "I'll Be Seeing You"; "I'll Get By"; "I Cover The Waterfront"; "Lover, Come Back to Me" / "Strange Fruit"; "She's Funny That Way"; "How Am I To Know"; "Fine And Mellow"; "My Old Flame"; "On The Sunny Side Of The Street"	
MLP 12-112	Bunk Johnson's Jazz Band, George Lewis	"Thriller Rag"; "When I Leave the World Behind"; "Weary Blues"; "Franklin Street Blues"; "Blue Bells Goodbye"; "Big Chief Battle Axe" / "Sobbin' Blues"; "Dusty Rag Yaaka Hula Hickey Dula"; "Shine"; "Sometimes My Burden Is So Hard To Bear"; "Sobbin' Blues No. 2"	
MLP 12-113: Leadbelly's Last Sessions volume 1	Leadbelly, Martha Ledbetter	Sides 1/2 : "I Was Standing In The Bottom"; "Yes, I'm Going Down In Louisiana"; "Ain't Going Down To The Well No More"; "Dick Ligger's Holler"; "Liza Jane"; "Dog Latin Song"; "Leavin' Blues"; "Go Down, Old Hannah"; "The Blue Tailed Fly"; "Nobody In This World Is Better Than Us"; "We're In The Same Boat, Brother"; "Looky, Looky Yonder"; "Jolly O' The Ransom"; "Old Ship Of ZionG"; "Bring Me A Little Water, Silvie"; "Mistreatin' Mamma"; "Black Betty"; "Ain't Going Down To The Well No More"/ "I'm Going Back Down In Louisiana"; "I Don't Know You, What Have I Done?"; "Rock Island Line"; "Old Man, Will Your Dog Catch A Rabbit?"; "Shorty George"; "Stewball"; "Bottle Up And Go"; "You Know I Got To Do It"; "Ain't It A Shame To Go Fishin' On Sunday"; "I Ain't Gonna Drink No More"; "My Lindy Lou"; "I'm Thinking Of A Friend"; "He Never Said A Mumbling Word"; "I Don't Want No More Army Life"; "In The World"; "I Want To Go Home"; Sides 3/4 "Midnight Special"; "Boll Weevil Blues"; "Careless Love"; "Easy Rider"; "Cry for me"; "I Ain't Gonna Drink No More"; "Birmingham Jail"; "Ol' Riley"; "Julia and Johnson"; "It's Tight Like That"; "Four, five and nine"; "Good Morning', Babe"; "Jail House Blues"; "Well, You Know I Had to Do It"; "Irene"; "Story of the 25 Cent Dude"; "How Come You Do Me Like You Do, Do, Do ?"; "Hello Central. Give me long distance phone"; "The Hesitation Blues"; "I'll Be Down on the Last Bread Wagon"	UK release of the 1953 Folkways remastered recordings, originally made by Frederic Ramsey Jr in September 1948.
MLP 12-114: Leadbelly's Last Sessions volume 2	Leadbelly	Sides 1/ 2 : Sides 3/4 :"Spring Time in the Rockies"; "Chinatown"; "Rock Island Line"; "Backwater Blues"; "Sweet Mary"; "Irene"; "Easy Mr. Tom"; "In the evening when the sun goes down"; "I'm alone because I love you"; "House of the Rising Sun"; "Mary, don't you weep and don't you moan"; "Talk about Fannin' Street"; "Fannin' Street"; "Sugared Beer"; "Didn't Ol' John cross the water"; "Nobody knows you when you're down and out"; "Bully of the Town"; "Sweet Jenny Lee"; "Yellow Gal"; "He was the man"; "We're in the same boat, brother"; "Leavin' Blues"	UK release of the 1953 Folkways remastered recordings, originally made by Frederic Ramsey Jr in September 1948.
MLP 12-115: Whoopin' & Hollerin′	Big Bill Broonzy, Sonny Terry, Brownie McGhee & Woody Guthrie	"Keep Your Hands Off" (Broonzy); "Stump Blues" (Broonzy); "Plough Hand Blues" (Broonzy); "Five Feet Seven" (Broonzy); "You Don't Want Me Blues" (Terry); "Tell Me Little Woman" (Terry, McGhee); "Don't You Hear Me Calling You" (Terry); "Silver Fox Chase" (Terry, Guthrie); "Worried And Lonesome Blues" (Terry, Guthrie); "Greyhound Bus Station" (Terry, McGhee); "She Is A Sweet Woman" (Terry, Guthrie); "South Bound Express" (Terry, Guthrie)	
MLP 12-115: Banjo in the hills: 16 great mountain songs by all star artists	Rusty York, Willard Hale, Bill Clifton, Jim and Jesse, Stanley Brothers, Carl Story, Jim Eanes, Country Gentlemen, Kentucky Travellers	"Banjo breakdown" (York and Hale); "Flowers from the hillside" (Cliffton); "Hard-hearted" (Jim and Jesse); "Gonna Paint the Town" (Stanley Brothers); "Cedar Grove" (Cliffton); "Blue Sunday" (Eanes); "That Happy Night" (Stanley Brothers); "Life's Evening Sun" (Story); "Banjo in the Hills" (Stanley Brothers); "Road Walked by Fools" (Eanes); "Don't Do It" (York and Hale); "Little White Washed Chimney" (Clifton); "Orange Blossom Fiddle" (Country Gentlemen); "Old Kentucky Hills" (Kentucky Travellers); "Take Back the Heart" (Clifton)	
MLP 12-116: Fiddlin' Country Style. Famous C & W Bands and Vocalists	Tommy Hill's String Band, Allen Shelton, Jim Eanes, Ken Clark, Don Anthony, The Country Gentlemen, Tommy Jackson, Harry Choates, Roy Russell, Big Tiger and his String Fiddle, Slim Cox, Wally Traugott, Bill Wimberley and his Band	"Fiddler's Love" (Hill); "Dine-e-o" (Shelton and Eanes); "Blue-grass Swing" (Clark and Anthony); "Orange Blossom Fiddle" (Country Gentlemen); "Fiddler's Prayer" (Hill); "Fiddlin' Joe" (Jackson); "Twin Fiddle Waltz" (Hill); "Chubby's Run" (Clark and Anthony); "Round town gals" (Eanes and Russell); "Daisies" (Hill); "Drag That Fiddle" (Choates); "Sparta Waltz" (Big Tiger); "Mocking Bird Special" (Cox); "Snowflake" (Traugott); "Swing Fiddle Rag" (Wimberley); "Ramblers Ride" (Clark and Anthony)	
MLP 12-117: Preachin', Prayin', Shoutin' & Singin' Gospel'	Carl Story, Lewis Family, Sunshine Boys, Southland Trio	"Satisfied"; "Shout and Shine"; "The Old Gospel Ship"; "Angel Band"; "I Saw the Light"; "Were You There?"; "Lights in the Valley"; "Who Will Sing For Me?"; "Let the Church Roll On"; "A Beautiful City"; "Lead Me"; "Insurance"; "Got to Cross Jordan"; "The Church Back Home"; "He Knew Just What to Do"; "I'm Ready to Go"	
MLP 12-118: Mountain Song Favourites	Stanley Brothers, The Clinch Mountain Boys	"Ridin' that midnite train"; "Another night"; "Beneath the maple"; "Ralph's banjo special"; "Gonna paint the town"; "Trust each other"; "Highway of regret"; "A little at a time"; "Choo choo comin'"; "Holiday pickin'"; "Carolina mountain home"; "That happy night"	
MLP 12-119: All Time country Music Great	Cowboy Copas	"Alabam"; "Pretty Diamonds"; "I'm A Slave To You"; "I Can"; "Black Cloud Risin'"; "Wings of the Great Speckled Bird"; "South Pacific Shore"; "Waltzing' With Sin"; "Dreaming"; "Pickin' The Blues"; "Mom and Dad's Affair"; "The Purple Robe"	
MLP 12-120: Singin' Time Down South	The Lewis Family	"Carry On"; "You Can't Do Wrong"; "Help Me Understand"; "Jesus Is My King"; "I Do Believe"; "A Beautiful City"; "Wait A Little Longer Please Jesus"; "At The End Of My Journey" // "Just One Rose"; "He's Got The Whole World In His Hands"; "Hide You In The Blood"; "I'm Not Alone"; "I Shall Not Be Moved"; "I See Jesus"; "My Closest Kin"; "To Get My Reward"	
MLP 12-121			
MLP 12-122: Sacred Songs from the Hills	The Stanley Brothers, The Clinch Mountain Boys	"Gathering Flowers for the Master's Bouquet"; "In Heaven We'll Never Grow Old"; "Praise The Lord (I Saw The Light)"; "Where We'll Never Die"; "The Darkest Hour is Just Before Dawn"; "Let Me Hide Myself In Thee (Rock Of Ages)" / "Let the Church Roll On"; "Rank Strangers"; "I'm Ready to Go"; "Mother No Longer Awaits Me at Home"; "A Few More Seasons"; "What a Friend We Have in Jesus"	
MLP 12-123: Hymns Sacred, Gospel Songs	Don Reno, Red Smiley & the Tennessee Cutups	"In The Garden"; "He Will Set Your Fields On Fire"; "I'll Meet You In The Morning"; "Jesus Will Save Your Soul"; "I Need The Prayers"; "The Lord's Last Supper" / "Whispering Hope"; "The Arm Of God"; "You Never Mentioned Him To Me"; "I Feel Like Travelling On"; "Mother's Only Sleeping"; "Little Country Preacher"	
MLP 12-124: All Star West Indian Steel Bands - Music From Oil Drums		Antigua Steel Band;The Bells of St. Mary; Steel Band Welcome; Ugly Woman; Casablanca Serenade; Crushy / Peanut Vendor; La Paloma ' Steel Band in F; Invaders Mambo; Valerie; Cocanuts	
MLP 12-125: Tropical Rhythms Of Jamaica	Luther Williams & His Orchestra	"Tequila Mambo"; "Seven Bells"; "Arawak Cha Cha"; "Merengue For Mary"; "Reincarnation"; "Love Me Tender"; "Cha Cha in Jazz"; "Water Melon"; "Merengue Over Jordan"; "Cha Cha For Chuck"; "Shake Señora"; "Oink Oink Mambo"	
MLP 12-126: Dixieland Horn	Max Kaminsky, Eddie Condon	"Love Nest"; "Back in Your Own Back Yard"; "Fidgety Feet"; "All the wrongs you've Done to Me"; "Don't Leave Me Daddy"; "Eccentric"; "Everybody Loves My Baby"; "Rose room"; "Mandy, Make up your Mind"; "You Can't Cheat a Cheater"; ""Singing the Blues"; "Guess Who's in Town"	
MLP 12-127: Mild & Wild	Wild Bill Davison & His Commodores	"That's A Plenty"; "Baby Won't You Please Come Home"; "Clarinet Marmalade"; "I Don't Stand A Ghost Of A Chance"; "I'm Coming Virginia"; "At The Jazz Band Ball", "Panama"; "Confessin'"; "Riverboat Shuffle"; "Wabash Blues"; "Wrap Your Troubles In Dreams"; "High Society"	
MLP 12-128: A Folk Evening With George Browne	George Browne	"Shango"; "Liza"; "Yellow Bird"; "Cricket"; "Heaven Is So High"; "Tu Tu Maramba"; "La Firolera"; "Long Way From Home"; "Hava Nagela"; "Unemployment Compensation Blues"; "Jordan River"; "Immigration Blues"; "Still Still"; "Never Wed An Old Man"; "Four Nights Drunk"; "Who Will Deliver Me"	
MLP 12-129: Calypsos Too Hot To Handle	Lord Kitchener	"Wife & Mother"; "Red Head"; "My Wife's Nightie"; "Kitch Take It Easy"; "Piccadilly Folk"; "Alphonso In Town" // "Woman's Figure"; "Muriel & The Bug"; "Is Trouble"; "Too Late Kitch"; "January Girls"; "Old Lady Take A Walk"	
MLPBS 12-129: Kitch - King Of Calypso (First Course)	Lord Kitchener	"A Drink A Rum"; "Wife And Mother"; "Red Head"; "My Wife's Nightie"; "Kitch Take It Easy"; "Woman's Figure" //"Elsie's River (Big Toe)"; "Muriel And the Bug"; "Is Trouble"; "Too Late Kitch"; "Jamaican Turkey"; "Carnival"	
MLP 12-130: Calypsos Too Hot To Handle Volume 2	Lord Kitchener	"Excuse Me Sandra"; "Life Begins At Forty"; "Kitch"; "Romeo"; "White & Black"; "Rhumba Anna" // "Marjorie's Flirtation"; "Rebound Wife"; "Nosey Mother In Law"; "Short Skirts"; "Mamie Water"; "Black Puddin"	
MLP 12-131: Great African Highlife Music	Nigerian Union Rhythm Bnad, Ambrose Campbell * His West African Rhythm Brothers, Nat Atkins and His Crazy Bees, Flash Domincii and the Fabulous Supersonics	Nigerian Union Rhythm Band - "Unity" (Nigerian Union); "Oba Adele" (Campbell); "Iwa D'arekere" (Campbell); "Togootigiri" (Atkins); Nat Atkins & His Crazy Bees - "Sumongole" (Atkins); "The Memorial Of Chief J.K. Randle" (Nigerian Union); "Iwa Ika Ti Beda Je" (Domincii); "Fija F'Olorun Ja" (Domincii); "Iwin Nla Pade Wa" (Domincii); "Eso Eso N'igbin Ma Ngunda" (Domincii); "Ki Dide" (Domincii); "Rora Rora Ma Jo Omo Pupa" (Domincii)	
MLP 12-132: Don't Touch My Nylons	Marie Bryant	"Mary Had A Little Lamb"; "Chi Chi Boom"; "Too Much (Isn't Good For You)"; "Noisy Springs"; "Water Melon"; "Don't Touch My Nylons"; "Sixty Minute Man"; "Suede Shoes Calypso"; "(Don't touch me) Tomato"; "Little Boy"	
MLP 12-133: Ram Blues & Soul	Ram John Holder	"I Know What It's All About" / "Nottinghill Eviction Blues" / "Baby Don't You Forget Me" / "Just Across The River" / "Ramblues" / "Peace In The Valley" // "Well Oh Well" / "Greenwich Village Blues" / "It Won't Be Long" / "I'm No Stranger" / "Together On This Road" / "Early In The Morning"	
MLP 12-134: Great African Highlife Music Volume 2	Ayinde Bakare and his Meranda Orchestra, West African Rhythm Brothers and Abiodun Oke, Nat Atkins and his Crazy Bees, Nigerian Union Rhythm Group, T. Odeuso's Akesan Highlifers, Rans Boi & His African Highlife Band	"Iwa Lewa" (Bakare); "Calabar-o" (Rhythm Brothers); "Somojele" (Atkins); "Eroya" (Rhythm Brothers); "Ojitibi" (Nigerian Union); "Ibadan Ni Pade" (Odeuso); "Ojikolubo" (Nigerian Union); "Adura Fun Awon Aboyun" (Bakare); "Darling Don't Say No" (Atkins); "Omo Laso" (Rhythm Brothers); "Sebotimo" (Bakare); "Ominira" (Rhythm Brothers); "Fedse" (Boi); "Y.B. Club" (Rhythm Brothers); "The Late J.K. Randle" (Bakare)	
MLP 12-135			
MLP 12-136			
MLP 12-137: Your Holiday In Malta	Charles Camilleri		
MLP 12-138: Merry Christmas Caribbean Style	Caribbean Rhythm Kings	"Let The Children Sing"; "Three Riders"; "Mary's Boy Child"; "The Virgin Mary"; "Jesus Emmanuel"; "Puerto Rican Carol"; "Little Jesus"; "It's Christmas Time Again"; "Paraguayan Carol"; "Silent Night"; "Coventry Carol"; "Christmas Morning Blues"; "Good King Wenceslas"; "O Little Town Of Bethlehem"	
MLP 12-139			
MLPAS 12-140: Live the Highlife	Ayinde Bakare and his Meranda Orchestra	"Tribute to the late J.K. Randle"; "Eko Akete (Lagos Akete)"; "Adura Fun Awon Aboyun (Prayer for the Pregnant Women)"; "Ibikunle Alakija; Iwalewa (Your Manner is Your Beauty)"; "Ore Otito Osi (There's no true friend)"; "Mo b'eru Aiye (I fear the humanity)"; "Ile Aiye Ile Asan (Life is vanity upon vanity)"; "Agbola Ola Odunekan"; "Olabisi Arobieke"; "Akambi Balogun"	
MLP 12-141: Highlife From Nigeria: "The Wind In A Frolic"	Brewster Hughes And His Highlifers	"Mosalasi Kura"; "Sweet Galilee"; "So So Bobo Deen"; "Asewo Eko"; "The Glory Of The Lord"; "Oratido Soso"; "Silhouette"; "Love Is So Blind"; "Sa Sa Kroma"; "Maria Joanna"; "The Little Grocer Man"	Guest artist Adetola Bashorun from the Nigerian Union Rhythm Group.
MLPAS 12-142	Tunde Nightingale and his Highlife Boys	"The Bird that Sings All the Night"; "Eyo Beat"; "The Boy is Good"; "Kendy-Mama"; "Yaya Olunrete"; "La Paloma"; "Omo Lafiaji"; "Deady Body Never Smokey"; "O Lo Wo Nin Lara"; "Jennifer"; "Araba"	
MLP 12-143			
MLP 12-144			
MLP 12-145			
MLP 12-146: Calypso Carnival	Mighty Sparrow with The Ron Berridge Orchestra	"Mr. Walker"; "Wood In The Fire"; "Carnival In '68"; "Duncan"; "Jook For Jook" // "Jane"; "One Hand Man"; "Macco Man"; "Crazy Jam"; "Calypso Boogaloo"	The Ron Berridge Orchestra: Joe Alexander and Vasso DeFreitas (alto saxophones); Conrad Little (bass); Ricardo Brewster (drums); Earl Lezama, Gary Salandy (guitars); Ulric Sobian (organ); Edgar Fitzgerald (percussion); Collins Dennis (tenor saxophone); Jerry Cooper, Nev Oxley (trombones); Clem Berridge, Ron Berridge (trumpets)
MLPS 12-149: Fattenin' Frogs For Snakes	Memphis Slim	"Messin' Around"; "One More Time"; "Fattenin' Frogs For Snakes"; "Ain't Nobody's Business"; "Help Me Some"; "Worried Life"; "Every Day"; "I Feel So Good"; "Angel Child"; "Blues In London"	1965 UK 10-track stereo vinyl LP Melodisc recorded in London on 27 July 1960. "I Feel So Good" [Tribute To Big Bill] & Parts 1 & 2 of Blues In London.
MLP 12-150: The Joe Harriott Quintet Swings High	Joe Harriott Quintet	"Tuesday Morning Swing"; "Time For Love"; "The Rake"; "Blues In C" // "Shepherd's Serenade"; "Polka Dots And Moonbeams"; "Strollin' South"; "Count Twelve"	Joe Harriott (alto saxophone); Coleridge Goode (bass); Phil Seaman( drums); Pat Smythe (piano); Stu Hamer (trumpet) Recorded 20 June 1967.
MLP 12-151: The Exciting Music of Ravi Shankar	Ravi Shankar	Hema-Bihag, Malaya Marutam, Mishra-Mand (ragas)	Shanta Prasad (tabla); Ravi Shankar (sitar)
MLP 12-152: A Night At The Taj	Ustad Vilayat Khan, Imrat Khan		Chandani Kedar, Chandani Kedar (ragas); Ustad Vilayat Khan (sitar); Ustad Imrat Khan (surbahar); Nizzamuddin (tabla)
SMLP 12-153: Cupid	Owen Gray	"Cupid"; "I Wanna Be Loved"; "Tennessee Waltz"; "Tree In The Meadow"; "Hi Hi Hi"; "Just Out Of Reach" //"I Think It's Gonna Work Out Fine"; "A Lover's Question"; "Hold Me Tight"; "Boys And Girls"; "Three Coins In A Fountain"; "La La La"; "The Great Pretender"	
MLP 12-154: The Exciting Music of Ravi Shankar, Volume 2	Ravi Shankar	"Bilampat"; "Drut"	Marwa, Hemant, Prach, Tilak Shyam, Sindhu Bhairavi, Nat Bhairo, Puriya Kalyan, Bhatiar, Hameer, Kirwani, Pancham Se Gara, Yaman Manj (ragas); Dhun (Benghali kirtan); Ravi Shankar (sitar); Pandit Chaturlal (tabla)
MLP 12-155			
MLP 12-156: Sister Big Stuff	Prince Buster	"South Of The Border"; "Still"; "Protection"; "Why Not Tonight"; "Wish You A Picture"; "Sata Amasa Gana"; "Sister Big Stuff"; "Stand Accused"; "Bridge Over Trouble Water"; "Stick By Me"; "Young, Gifted & Black"; "Cool Operator"	
MLP 12-157: Big 5	Prince Buster	"Big 5"; "Kinky Griner"; "Leave Your Man"; "Give Her"; "Bald Head Pum Pum"; "At the Cross" / "Fishey Fishey"; "The Virgin"; "Black Pum Pum"; "Every Man Pum Pum"; "Tonight"; "Wash The Pum Pum"	
MLP 12-158: Jamaica's Greatest	Dennis Brown, The Heptones, John Holt, Alton Ellis, Prince Buster, The Ethiopians	"One Day Soon" (Brown); "Our Day Will Come" (Heptones); "If I Had the World" (Holt); "News" (Holt); "Since I Fell For You" (Ellis); "Still" (Buster); "Mona Lisa" (Holt); "God Bless the Children" (Heptones); "If I Ruled the World" (Brown); "Good Loving" (Ellis); "My Happiness" (Buster and Ethiopians); "Protection" (Buster)	
SMLP 12-160: Raga Parameshwari	Ravi Shankar	"Raga Parameshwari Alap, Vilambit Jor"; "Raga Parameshwari Madh And Drut Jor And Gat In Dhamar";	Ravi Shankar (sitar); Alla Rakha (tabla); Ananda, Pranesh (tambura)
MLP 12-161	Padma Bhushan Pandit Ravi Shankar, Padma Bhushan Ustad Ahmedjan Thirakhwa	"Tabla" (Solo, Teental) (Thirakhwa); "Raga Behag" (Alap, Jod) (Shankar) / "Raga Behag" (Vilambit, Madhya-Laya, Gat In Teental) (Shankar and Thirakhwa)	
MLP 12-170: John Holt – Greatest Hits	John Holt	"Get Ready"; "First Time"; "Oh Girl"; "For Your Love"; "My Love"; "Rain From The Skies"; "Close To Me"; "I'm Not A King"; "If I Ruled The World"; "Love (Version)"	
SMLP 12-171: Naushad - The Messenger of Love	Naushad	"Memories"; "Song Of The Waves"; "Dream Ride In A Buggy"; "Broken Heart"; "The Messenger Of Love"; "Separation"; "Frustration"; "Morning In Banaras"; "Chikara"; "Reunion"; "Love Theme"; "Rape"; "Peacock Dance"; "Morning Of Hope"	
SMLP 12-174: 'Sidney Bechet'	Sidney Bechet	"Georgia"; "I Told You Once"; "Black & Blue"; "Some of These Days"; "When It's Sleepytime Down South"; "Who's Sorry Now?"; "Baba Rhumba" // "Mayette Meringue"; "Sous Les Palmiers"; "Magic Island Meringue"; "Tropical Mood Meringue"; "Sister Kate"; "Rosa Rhumba"	Side 1: Sidney Bechet(cl) with Humphrey Lyttleton and his Band, London 13 Nov 1949 except "Baba Rhumba" Sidney Bechet(cl) with Willie "The Lion " Smith (p), Kenneth Roane (tp), Zutty Singleton (drums), Olin Alderhold (bass), New York 22 Nov 1939 . Side 2:Sidney Bechet(cl) with Willie "The Lion " Smith (p), Kenneth Roane (tp), Zutty Singleton (drums), Olin Alderhold (bass), New York 22 Nov 1939, except " Sister Kate " Sidney Bechet(cl), Joe Sullivan (p), George Wettling(dms), George" Pops " Foster (bass), New York, December 1949 .
MLP 12-180: OK Fred	John Holt	"Come Dance With Me (Let's Dance)"; "My Eyes"; "Anywhere You Want To Go"; "Sad News"; "OK Fred"; "My Sweet Lord"; "Long and Winding Road"; "Holly Holy"; "Sometimes"; "Silently"; "Don't Leave"; "Be Wise"	
MLP 12-190: Keep Your Eyes On Jesus	Ken Parker	"This World Is Not My Home"; "The Flowers, The Sunset, The Trees"; "Will The Circle Be Unbroken?"; "Lily Of The Valley"; "Teach Me How To Pray"; "Peace In The Valley" // "Oh! Where Shall I Be?"; "Across The Bridge"; "Telephone To Glory"; "Just A Closer Walk With Thee"; "He Sets Me Free"; "Keep Your Eyes On Jesus"	Produced by C. S. Dodd
MLP 12-191: John Holt & Friends	John Holt & Paragons	"My Satisfaction"; "Happy Go Lucky Girl"; "Wear You To The Ball"; "The Depth Of Love"; "Let's Build Our Dreams" / "Darling, I Need Your Loving"; "One More Bottle Of Beer"; "Have You Ever Been In Love"; "Change Your Style"; "Can't Get You Out Of My Mind"	Produced by C. S. Dodd
MLP 12-192: Battle Of The Giants	John Holt, Delroy Wilson, Alton Ellis, Dennis Brown, Horace Andy, Ken Boothe	"If It Don't Work Out" (Holt); "Money Lover" (Wilson); "The Picture Was You" (Ellis); "Something Bugging Me" (Brown); "Oh Lord, Why Lord?"; "Your Heart Gonna Pay" (Ellis); "A Love I Can Feel" (Holt); "Dancing Mood" (Wilson); "Thinking" (Boothe); "No Man Is An Island" (Brown); "Found Someone Of My Own" (Andy); "Richard Coury" (Boothe)	Produced by C. S. Dodd
MLP 12-193: Sounds Of Young Jamaica (A Collection Of Original 12 Big Hits Vol. 1)	The Heptones, John Holt, The Cables, Alton Ellis, Delroy Wilson, The Wailers, The Gaylads	"I Hold The Handle" (Heptones);"I Am Your Man" (Heptones); "Stranger In Love" (Holt); "OK Fred" (Holt); "Baby Why" (Cables); "I'm Just A Guy" (Ellis); "One One" (Wilson); Alton Ellis - "I'm Still In Love" (Ellis); "One Love" (Wailers); "No Good Girl" (Gaylads); "Lady In The Red Dress" (Gaylads); "I Don't Need Your Love" (Wailers)	Produced by C. S. Dodd
MLP 12-195: Classics To Calypso	The Barbados Steel Orchestra	"Toronto Mas"; "House Of The Rising Sun"; "Rico Serenade"; "Barbados My Island Of Dreams"; "Mrs Harriman"; "Eine Kleine Nachtmuzik (1st Movement)"; "Eine Kleine Nachtmuzik (3rd Movement)"; "Elisabethan Serenade"; "Something"; "Chow Chow Bambino"	
MLP 12-198: Hit Parade Africain	Pierre Moutaouri, Orchestre Sinza, Franco, TP OK Jaxx, Trio Matamaros, Orchestre Les Rebelles, Jose Missamou, Les Bantous, Dieudos, Orchestre Les Noirs, Fidel Zizi, Orchestre Mando Negro, Chuza, Vicky, Orchestre Hi-Fives	"Mahoungou" (Moutaouri, Sinza); "Y E No. 1" (OK Jazz, Franco); "Manicero" (Missamou, Matamaros, Les Rebelles); "Macaro" (Missamou, Bantous); "Sikiya Sauce No. 1" (Dieudos, Les Noirs); "Yamba Yamba" (OK Jazz); "Massamba M J" (Zizi, Mando Negro); "Amin No. 1" (Chuza, Les Noirs); "Belina Mon Amour" (Vicky, Hi-Fives)	
MLP 12-199: Lord Kitchener, King of Calypso. Calypsos Too Hot To Handle	Lord Kitchener	"Wife and Mother"; "Red Head"; "My Wife's Nightie"; "Kitch Take it Easy"; "Piccadilly Folk"; "Alphonso In Town"; "Don't Kiss Me Too Low"; "Woman's Figure"; "Muriel and The Bug"; "Is Trouble"; "Too Late, Kitch"; "January Girls"; "Old Lady Walk"; "Carnival"	
MLP 12-200: Lord Kitchener, King of Calypso. Calypsos Too Hot To Handle	Lord Kitchener	"Excuse Me Sandra"; "Life Begins At 40"; "Kitch"; "Romeo"; "White And Black"; "Rhumba Anna"; "Drink-A-Rum"; "Marjorie's Flirtation"	
MLP BS-201: Merengues From Cuba!	Enrique Aviles Y Son Orchestra	"Maria"; "Merenguiando"; "Sin Tambora"; "La Empaliza"; "Merenguesa Boriquen"; "La Mujer Puerto Riquena"; "Contigo" / "Baila Merengue"; "Mayaguez"; "Merengue No.1"; "Tarlatane Merengue"; "Conde Danse Merengue"; "Si Tu Nola Otra"	
MLP BS-202: Les Bouzoukis De Mikis Theodorakis	Mikis Theodorakis and Maria Farandouri	"Sto Parathiri Stekossoun"; "Balanda Tou Andrikou"; "Myrtia"; "To Yelasto Pedi"; "Tou Mikou Voria"; "Apagoghi" / "Varka Sto Yalo"; "To Parathiro"; "Marina"; "Mana Mou Ke Panayia"; "Yitonia Ton Anghelon"	
MLP BS-203: Balsara & His Singing Sitars	Balsara	"These Boots Are Made For Walking "; Puppet On A String"; "My Favourite Things"; "I Want to Hold Your Hand"; "Sugar Town"; "Edelweiss"; "Do-Re-Mi"; "If I Had a Hammer"; "Strangers In The Night"; "Tequila"; "Lemon Tree"; "Lara's Theme - Somewhere My Love"	Vishtasp Ardeshir Balsara, born in Bombay (Mumbai) India .died 2005.
MLP BS-204: The Cream of the Showbands - Songs of Freedom		"I'll tell my Ma"; "Kevin Barry"; "The Bould O'Donahue"; "The Jolly Tinker"; "Danny Boy"; "The Wild Colonial Boy"; "Katie Daley" // "March Hare"; "40 Shades of Green"; "Mountain Dew"; "Galway Bay"; "The Wild Irish Rover"; "Isle of Innisfree"; "The Holy Ground"	
MLP SBS-205: Songs Of The United Kingdom	The Pontardulais Male Choir	Down Among The Dead Men;Tom Bowling;Linden Lea;Golden Slumbers;Annie Laurie;Flow Gently Sweet Afton; Ye Banks And Braes; Will Ye No Come Back Again // Men Of Harlech; All Through The Night; David Of The White Rock;Watching The Wheat; Off In The Stilly Night;Londonderry Air;She Moves Through The Fair; Cockles & Mussels Conductor - Noel G Davis, Soloist - Wynford Evans	
MLP BS-206: Songs Of Love And Action	Edgar Samuel	"On board a Ninety-eight"; "Randall my son"; "The Faithful Maiden"; "O rare Turpin hero"; "Little Sir William"; "Down by the Sally Gardens"; "You're over the hill"; "Cupid's Garden"; "O Waly Waly" / "Sam Binnacle"; "O Foggy Dew"; "Greensleeves"; "Do not, O, do not prize thy beauty"; "Long, long the night"; "Smugglers Song"; "But o thy beauty"; "A wet sheet and a flowing sea"; "Farewell and Adieu"	
MLP 12-216: Honeys	Bob Marley, The Wailers, The Skatalites, Burning Spear, Andy and Joey, Roland Alphonso, Jackie and Doreen, Don Drummond, Jackie Opel	"Simmer Down" (Marley, Wailers); "Salt Lane Gal" (Skatalites); "Long and Winding Road" (Burning Spear); "Wonder No More" (Andy and Joey); "Bongo Tango" (Alphonso); "Sucu Sucu" (Alphonso); "20-75" (Alphonso); "The Vow" (Jackie and Doreen); "How Many Times" (Marley, The Wailers); "Roll on, Sweet Don" (Drummond); "Foggy Road Version" (Burning Spear); "Go, Jimmy, Go" (Marley, Wailers); Alternatively: "Simmer Down" (Wailers); "Push Wood" (Opel); "Foggy Road" (Burning Spear); "Wonder No More" (Andy and Joey); "Bongo Tango" (Alphonso); "Sucu Sucu" (Alphonso); "20-75" (Alphonso); "The Vow" (Jackie and Doreen); "How Many Times" (Wailers); "Heaven And Earth" (Drummond); "Foggy Road version" (Burning Spear); "Go, Jimmy, Go" (Wailers)	
MLP 12-217: 12 Carat Gold	The Eternals, Soul Brothers, Normal Frazer, The Heptones, The Paragons, Roland alphonso, The Tennors, Sound Specialists, Ken Parker, Bop & the Beltones, The Heptones	"Stars" (Eternals); "Sound Pressure" (Soul); "First Cut" (Frazer); "Love Won't Come Easy" (Heptones); "My Satisfaction" (Paragons); "Well Charge" (Alphonso); "Sweet Soul Ride" (Alphonso); "Pressure & Side" (Tennors); "Red Dub" (Specialists); "Choking Kind" (Parker); "Dancing Time" (Bop); "Why Did You Leave" (Heptones)	
MLP 13-301: Jazz at the Philharmonic		"How High the Moon"; "Lady Be Good"	Joe Guy, Howard McGhee (trumpets); Willie Smith (alto sax); Illinois Jacquet, Charlie Ventura (tenor sax); Garland Finney (piano); Ulysses Livingston (guitar); Red Callender (bass); Gene Krupa (drums) Live "Philharmonic Auditorium", Los Angeles, CA, 12 February 1945.
MS 1: Prince Buster's Fabulous Greatest Hits	Prince Buster	"Earthquake"; "Texas Hold-Up"; "Freezing Up Orange Street"; "Free Love"; "Julie"; "Take It Easy"; "Judge Dread"; "Too Hot"; "Ghost Dance"; "Ten Commandments"; "Al Capone"; "Barrister Pardon"	
MS 2: Prince Buster - Greatest Hits	Prince Buster	"Wash All Your Troubles Away"; "Hold Them"; "Shaking Up Orange Street"; "We Shall Overcome"; "Last Train To London"; "Time Longer Than Rope"; "I Feel The Spirit"; "Madness"; "Closer Together"; "They Got To Come"; "All Alone"; "Soul Of Africa"	
MS 4: 15 Oldies But Goodies	Keith and Enid, Duke Reid's Group, Ruddy and Sketto, Bell's Group, A The Flames, The Folks Brothers, Derick Morgan, Buster All Stars, F.D. Long, Winston and Errol, The Prince, The Monarchs, Jamaica Greatest	"Worried Over You" (Kevin and Enid); "What Makes Honey" (Reid); "My Heart's Desire" (Ruddy and Sketto); "Kingston 13" (Bell); "Helena Darling" (Flames); "Carolina" (Folks); "Throw Them Away" (Morgan); "City Riot" (Buster); "Down Beat Burial" (Buster); "Got A New Girl" (Long); "South Virginia" (Buster); "Fay Is Gone" (Winston and Errol); "It's Burkes Law" (Jamaica Greatest); "Feel Up" (Prince); "Sauce & Tea" (Monarchs)	
MS 6: Prince Buster- Tutti Frutti	Prince Buster	"Black Head Chinaman"; "Tongue Will Tell"; "Time Longer Than Rope"; "They Got To Come"; "Madness"; "Praise Without Raise"; "Wash Wash"; "Enjoy Yourself"; "Belief Will Kill And Cure"; "Danny, Dane & Lorraine"; "Over and over"; "Creation"	
MS 7: Prince Buster - The Message Dubwise	Prince Buster	"Swing Low"; "Sata A Miss Gana"; "Java Plus"; "The Message"; "Mississippi" / "Saladin"; "Why Am I Treated So Bad"; "Jet Black"; "Black Harlem"; "Big Youth"	
MS 8: Chi Chi Run (with Friends)	Big Youth, John Holt, Prince Buster All Stars, Dennis Brown, Alton Ellis, Little Youth	"Chi Chi Run" (Holt and Big Youth); "Haft" (Buster); "Revolution Rock" (Buster and Big Youth); "Revolution Come" (Buster and Big Youth); "Leave Your Skeng" (Holt and Big Youth); "Miami Beach" (Buster); "Leggo Beast" (Holt and Big Youth); "Youth Rock" (Little Youth); "One Day Soon" (Brown); "If I Had The World" (Brown); "Boop" (Buster); "Since I Fell For You" (Ellis)	
MS 10 (PB 10): The Original Golden Oldies Vol. 2	Folk Brothers, Count Ossie Afro Combo, Eric Morris, Drumbago All Stars, Owen Gray, Bobby Aitken, Buster's Group, Raymond Harper, Bunny and Skitter, Derrick Morgan, Basil Gabbidon	"O Carolina" (Folk, Ossie); "Humpty Dumpty" (Morris, Drumbago); Millie Girl (Gray); "Never Never" (Aitken, Buster); "They Got to Come" (Buster); "Helena Gency Ten" (Buster); "African Blood" (Harper, Buster's Group); "Chubby #" (Bunny and Skitter); "Shake A Leg" (Morgan, Drumbago); "Money Can't Buy Life" (Morris); "War Paint" (Gabbidon, Buster); "Black Head Chinaman" (Buster)	Presented by Prince Buster Record Shack.
MS 15: Swing Your Partner: Authentic American Square Dances	Butlin's American Square Dancers, Danny Levan's Tennessee Rakers, Wally Goodman	Big Deal; Rakes of Mallow; "Ragtime Annie"; "Soldier's Joy"; "Left Handed Indian Jig"; "Devil's Dream"; "Split the Ring"; "Virginia Reel"; "Fall Back Six"; "Butlin Reel"; "Dip & Dive"; "Birdie in the Cage"	
ML 8: Four Raga Moods	Ravi Shankar	"Ahir Lalit"; "Abhogi-kananda"; "Talik-shyam"; "Rasiya"	Gopi Mohan & Niren Roy (tampura); Ravi Shankar (sitar); Kanai Dutt (tabla) 2 discs
ML 14: The Peaceful Music Of Ustad Ali Akbar Khan	Ustad Ali Akbar Khan	"Miyan Ki Todi"; "Zilla-Kafi"	Recorded in India about 1964 - sleeve note - released about 1971.
Melodisc Afro-Cuban Collection GV2: Don Azpiazu & His Havana Casino Orchestra	Don Azpiazu & His Havana Casino Orchestra, Shake Keane & His Highlifers, Luiz Gonzaga, Sexteto Habanero, Desi Arnaz & His Orchestra, Los Magos Chucho Guillermo y José, Don Carlos & His Orchestra	"Peanut Vendor" (Azpiazu); "Babalu" (Azpiazu); "Chili Sauce" (Carlos); "El Aguacero" (Magos); "Baionga" (Keane); "Baiao" (Gonzaga); "India Inglesa" (Habanero); "Tico Tico" (Arnaz); "Mi Cafetal" (Magos); "Brazil" (Arnaz) [possibly]; "Romantica Mujer" (Habanero); "Maria Cristina" (Carlos)	
MLP 14-003	The Flambeaux Steelband	"Red Red Wine"; "I Can Feel It"; "Mas in Brooklyn"; "Shing-a-ling: Come into my life"; "Panoroia"; "Samba D'Orphee"; "Oh, Happy Day"; "Get Your Fella"; "Evil Ways"; "Medley from Hair"	Recorded at Chalk Farm Studios, London, in summer of 1971. Manufactured by Fungus Productions Ltd.
SP-3001: Genius	The Mighty Sparrow		
SP-3002: Tattoo Woman	The Mighty Sparrow		
SP-3003: Slave	The Mighty Sparrow		
SP-3004: Calypso 1967 Top Ten			
SP-3005			
SP-3006 Congo Man	Mighty Sparrow	"Congo Man"; "Solomon Out"; "Patsy"; "No Bacchannal"; "A Mother's Love"; "Get Outa Here"; "Well Spoken Moppers"; "Man Like to Feel"; "Steering Wheel"; "Elaine See de Moon"	Sleeve - HILARY SP-3006, Labels Melodisc SP-3006. The vinyl is a UK pressing contained in a US style thick cardboard sleeve (Hilary SP 3006). There is a sticker on the front of the sleeve re-labelling it as Melodisc SP 3006 for the UK market.
