= List of calypso musicians =

This is a list of calypso musicians. Bands and artists are listed by the first letter in their name (not including the words "a", "an", or "the").

- Ajamu
- André Toussaint
- Anslem Douglas
- Arrow
- Atilla the Hun
- Black Stalin
- Byron Lee & the Dragonaires
- Calypso Rose
- Chalkdust
- Charles D. Lewis
- Crazy
- Lord Creator
- David Rudder
- Denyse Plummer
- Denzil Botus
- Destra
- Drupatee
- The Duke of Iron
- Edmundo Ros
- The Fabulous McClevertys
- Freddy Grant
- The Growler
- Growling Tiger
- Grynner
- Gypsy
- Harry Belafonte
- Isidora Agnes
- Jimmy Buffett
- Jolly Boys
- "King" Eric Gibson
- King Radio
- King Short Shirt
- Lionel Belasco
- Lord Beginner
- Lord Brynner
- Lord Caresser
- Lord Christo
- Lord Executor
- Lord Flea
- Lord Intruder
- Lord Invader
- Lord Kitchener
- Lord Melody
- Lord Mouse and the Kalypso Katz
- Lord Pretender
- Lord Radio
- Lord Shorty
- Lord Tickler
- Lord Woodbine
- Merchant
- The Merrymen
- Mighty Bomber
- Mighty Cypher
- Mighty Destroyer
- Mighty Dougla
- The Mighty Duke
- Mighty Gabby
- Mighty Panther
- Mighty Shadow
- Mighty Sparrow
- Mighty Spoiler
- Mighty Striker
- Mighty Terror
- Ras Shorty I
- Red Plastic Bag
- Roaring Lion
- Robert Mitchum
- Sam Manning
- Serenata Guayanesa
- Singing Sandra
- Sir Galba
- Sir Lancelot
- Sugar Aloes
- Superblue
- The Talbot Brothers of Bermuda
- Walter Ferguson
- The Wounded Soldier
- Wilmoth Houdini
- Young Pretender
- Young Tiger
- Your Song Is Good
- Yvonne Curtis

== See also ==
- Carnival Road March
- List of chutney musicians
- Lists of musicians
- Trinidad and Tobago
- Calypso
- Mento
- Soca
