= List of Caribbean music groups =

This is a list of notable recording artists known for performing various types of Caribbean music.

== Antigua and Barbuda ==
- Burning Flames
- El-A-Kru

== The Bahamas ==
- Baha Men
- Ronnie Butler
- Exuma
- "King" Eric Gibson
- Joseph Spence
- T-Connection

== Barbados ==
- Alison Hinds
- Arturo Tappin
- Dennis Bovell
- Cavite Chorale
- Cover Drive
- Draytons Two
- Grynner
- Krosfyah
- Charles D. Lewis
- Jackie Opel
- Lord Radio
- Gabby
- Rayvon
- Red Plastic Bag
- Rihanna
- Barbados Police Band
- Rupee
- Schofield Pilgrim
- Shontelle
- The Merrymen
- John Andrew King
- DJ Puffy

== Dominica ==
- Exile One
- Gramacks
- Lazo
- Swingin' Stars
- The Gaylords
- The Wizzard
- Windward Caribbean Kulture (W.C.K.)

== Grenada ==
- Ajamu
- Mighty Sparrow

== Guadeloupe ==
- Kassav'

== Montserrat ==
- Arrow
- Justin (Hero) Cassell

== Saint Lucia ==
- Nicole David

== Saint Kitts and Nevis ==
- Joan Armatrading

== Saint Vincent and the Grenadines ==
- Beckett
- Jamesy P
- Kevin Lyttle
- Mattafix

== Trinidad and Tobago ==
- André Tanker
- Anslem Douglas
- Marlon Asher
- Atilla the Hun
- Babla & Kanchan
- Billy Ocean
- Beenie Man
- Black Stalin
- "Boogsie" Sharpe/Earl Brooks
- Bunji Garlin
- Calypso Rose
- Chalkdust
- Charles D. Lewis
- Crazy
- David Rudder
- Denise Belfon
- Denyse Plummer
- Destra Garcia
- Drupatee Ramgoonai
- Haddaway
- Heather Headley
- Heeralal Rampartap
- Ken Greene
- KES the Band
- KMC
- Lennox Mohammed
- Lionel Belasco
- Lord Beginner
- Lord Creator
- Lord Invader
- Lord Kitchener
- Lord Melody
- Lord Mouse and the Kalypso Katz
- Maximus Dan
- Mighty Shadow
- Mighty Sparrow
- Mighty Spoiler
- Nicki Minaj
- Phase II Pan Groove
- Ras Shorty I
- Rikki Jai
- Roaring Lion
- Adesh Samaroo
- Jit Samaroo
- Hazel Scott
- Shurwayne Winchester
- Sugar Aloes
- Sundar Popo
- Superblue (Blueboy)
- Xtatik (w/Machel Montano/Mad Bull Crew)
- Rakesh Yankaran

== Virgin Islands ==
- Iyaz
- Midnite

== See also ==
- Carnival Road March
