= List of calypso songs about war =

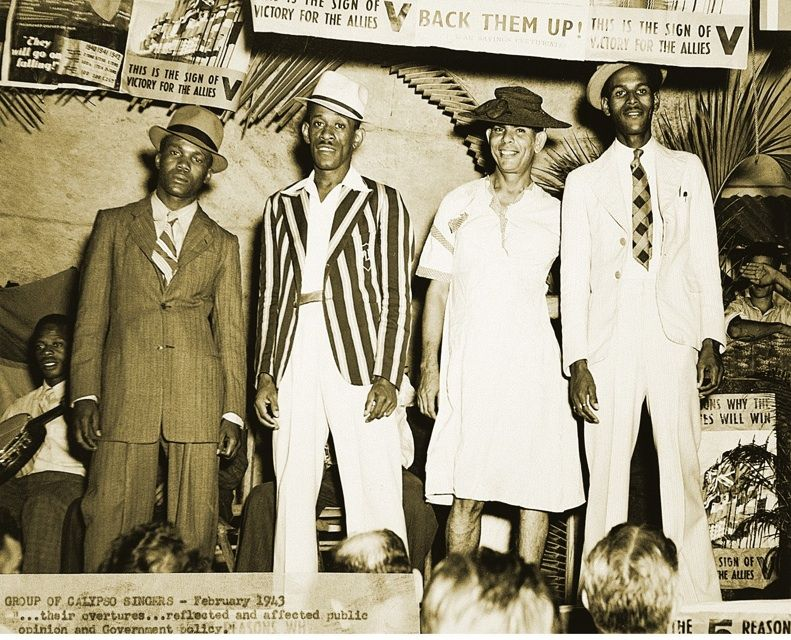
Lord Invader, The Growler, Atilla the Hun and Roaring Lion (1943) - Calypso22

This is a list of Calypso music songs whose lyrics and themes are about war. This type of calypsos derives from the tradition of using this musical form to document and discuss events of interest.

== 1900s ==
- "Boer War" (1900), Duke of Marlborough

== 1910s ==
- "Argos Papers" (1918), Lord Inventor - The Argos newspaper published an article on allowing carnival again after closure during WWI
- "Kaiser William, Run your Run" (1918), Lord Inventor - WWI

== 1930s ==
- "Abyssinian Lament" (1936), King Radio - Mussolini's attack on Abyssinia
- "Advantage Mussolini" (1936), Roaring Lion - Mussolini's attack on Abyssinia
- "African War Call" - "African War Song" (1938) - Roaring Lion
- "Carnival Again" (1939), Lord Executor
- "Chamberlain Says Peace" (1938), Lord Beginner - Prelude to WWII
- "Civil War in Spain" (1938), Growling Tiger - Spain's civil war
- "Ethiopian War Drums" (1935), Wilmoth Houdini - Mussolini’s attack on Abyssinia
- "Germany Invade Poland" (1939), King Radio - WWII
- "Gold of Africa (The)" (1935), Growling Tiger - Mussolini's attack on Abyssinia
- "Hitler" (1939), Lord Ziegfield - WWII
- "Hitler Demands" (1939), Mighty Growler - WWII
- "Horrors of War (The)" (1938), Atilla the Hun - Prelude to WWII
- 'How Hitler Invaded Poland' (1939), Lord Ziegfield - WWII
- "Let Them Fight for Ten Thousand Years" - "Let the White People Fight" (1939), Growling Tiger - Economic consequences of WWII in Trinidad
- "Poland, Poland" (1939), Roaring Lion - WWII
- "Poppy Day" (1938), Lord Executor
- "Selassie Is Held by the Police" (1937), Lord Caresser - Mussolini's attack on Abyssinia
- "Two Bad Men in the World" (1939), Lord Executor - WWII

== 1940s ==
- "Admiral Graf Spee (The)" (1940), Atilla the Hun
- "Adolf Hitler" (1941), Mighty Destroyer - WWII
- "Air Raid Shelters" (1943), King Radio - WWII
- "Black Market" (1945), Lord Beginner - WWII
- "Britain Will Never Surrender" (1941), Mighty Growler - WWII
- "Chinese Never Had a V.J. Day" - "Lay Fung Lee" - "Chinese Calypso" - "Chinese Memorial" - "Lai Fook Lee" (1948), Lord Kitchener
- "Fall of France" (1941), Mighty Growler - WWII
- "Farmer and Breadfruit Tree" (1943), Mighty Growler - Economic consequences of WWII in Trinidad
- "Germany Invade Poland" (1940), King Radio - WWII
- "Hitler Demanded Trinidad" (1940), Lord Invader - WWII
- "Hitler’s Attitude" (1940), Roaring Lion - WWII
- "Hitler's Mistake" (1940), Roaring Lion - WWII
- "Hitler’s Moustache" (1941), Lord Invader - WWII
- "Invasion of Britain" (1941), Atilla the Hun - WWII
- "Invasion of Poland (The)" - "Poland, Poland" (1940), Roaring Lion - WWII
- "Mr. Neville Chamberlain" (1940), Roaring Lion - WWII
- "Nazi Spy Ring" (1940), Mighty Growler - WWII
- "Norah the War Is Over" (1946), Lord Beginner
- "Ode to Russia" (1944), Atilla the Hun - WWII
- "Red Cross Society (The)" (1941), Atilla the Hun
- "Reply to Englishman" (1944), Atilla the Hun - Answer to an Englishman who said Trinidadians did not do enough for the war effort
- "Rise of the British Empire" (1940), Roaring Lion
- "Rum and Coca-Cola" (1944), Lord Invader - American soldier's presence in Trinidad
- "Run Your Run Hitler" (1940), Lord Beginner - WWII
- "Send Hitler to St. Helena" (1940), Atilla the Hun - WWII
- "Soldiers Came and Broke Up My Life (The)" (1945), Lord Invader - American soldier's presence in Trinidad
- "Winston Churchill" (1941), Roaring Lion - WWII
- "Yankee Harvest Is Over" (1945), Lord Beginner - American soldier's presence in Trinidad

== 1950s ==
- "Housewives" (1950), Lord Beginner - Economic hardship following WWII
- "Sauerkraut Calypso" (1956), Herbert Howard
- "Warning to Russia (A)" (1950), Mighty Viking
- ”Wars of Long Ago” (1958), Mighty Spoiler
- "Hydrogen Bomb (The)" (1954), Mighty Terror

== 1960s ==
- "Kennedy and Khrushchev" (1963), Mighty Sparrow - Cold war
- ”Make Love Not War” (1969), The Mighty Duke
- "Send Me Instead" (1968), King Fighter - Vietnam war

== 1970s ==
- "Chinese Love Affair" (1970), Mighty Sparrow - Vietnam war, interracial relationship (humour)
- "My Lai Incident (The)" (1970), The Shah - Vietnam war

== 1980s ==
- "Boots" (1983), Mighty Gabby - Government resources used for military spending
- "Children World" (1987), Chalkdust - General comment on wars
- "Grenada" - "Under Siege" (1984), Mighty Sparrow
- "Peace in de World" (1987), Black Stalin
- "War Mongers" (1988), Johnny King

== 2000s ==
- "Stop D War" (2008), Singing Sandra
- "Weapons of Mass Dis-Illusion" (2007), Mighty Sparrow

== 2010s ==
- War of Worlds" (2018), Ras Commanda

== Sources ==
=== Books ===
- Abrahams, Roger D. (1983). The Man-of-words in the West Indies: Performance and the Emergence of Creole Culture. Johns Hopkins University Press. ISBN 9780801828386.
- Attaway, William (2011). Calypso Song Book: Authentic Folk Music Of The Caribbean. Literary Licensing, LLC. ISBN 978-1258122133.
- Balliger, Robin (2000). Noisy Spaces: Popular Music Consumption, Social Fragmentation, and the Cultural Politics of Globalization in Trinidad. Stanford University. ISBN 9780493085357.
- Bilby, Kenneth M. (1985). The Caribbean as a Musical Region. Latin American Program, Woodrow Wilson International Center for Scholars.
- Dudley, Shannon (2004). Carnival music in Trinidad : Experiencing music, expressing culture. New York. ISBN 0-19-513833-3. OCLC 51607410.
- Gibbs, Craig Martin (2015). Calypso and other music of Trinidad, 1912-1962 : An annotated discography. Jefferson, North Carolina. ISBN 978-1-4766-1931-6. OCLC 908763141.
- Liverpool, First1=Hollis (Mighty Chalkdust) (June 1, 1987). Calypsonians to remember. Virgin Islands Commission. ISBN 0937421022.
- Liverpool, Hollis (2003). From the horse's mouth : An analysis of certain significant aspects in the development of the calypso and society as gleaned from personal communication with some outstanding calypsonians. Diego Martin, Trinidad: Juba Publications. ISBN 976-8194-13-8. OCLC 53795321.
- Liverpool, Hollis (1986). Kaiso and society. Charlotte Amalie, St. Thomas, V.I.: Virgin Islands Commission on Youth. OCLC 19282261.
- Luis, Robert (1960). Authentic Calypso, the Song, the Music, the Dance. Latin American Institute Press.
- Maharaj, George D. (2004). The roots of calypso, volume 1 - A short passage into the world of calypso. [Toronto]: G.D. Maharaj. ISBN 0-9734904-0-3. OCLC 57405250.
- Maharaj, George D. (2007). The Roots of Calypso, Volume 2 - Another passage into the world of calypso. Trinidad and Tobago Hi Tech Printers Inc. Ltd.
- Mighty Sparrow (1963). One hundred and Twenty Calypsos to remember. Caribbean Printers.
- Nurse (2007). Unheard voices : The rise of steelband and calypso in the Caribbean and North America. New York: iUniverse. ISBN 978-0-595-40153-6. OCLC 137751788.
- Pierre, Giselle (2016). Calypso chronicles: history through calypso I. CreateSpace Independent Publishing Platform. ISBN 9781508436201.
- Pierre, Giselle (2021). Calypso chronicles: history through calypso II. Independently Published. ISBN 979-8548539021.
- Quevedo, Raymond (Atilla the Hun) (1983). Attila's kaiso: A short history of Trinidad Calypso. St. Augustine, Trinidad & Tobago, West Indies: University of the West Indies, Dept. of Extra Mural Studies.
- Rohlehr, Gordon (1990). Calypso & society in pre-independence Trinidad. Port of Spain, Trinidad. ISBN 976-8012-52-8. OCLC 23928095.
- Warner, Keith Q. (1982). Kaiso! The Trinidad calypso: A study of the calypso as oral literature. Washington, D.C. ISBN 0-89410-025-4. OCLC 8762968.

=== Journals ===
- Austin, Roy. "Understanding Calypso Content: A Critique and an Alternative Explanation". Caribbean Quarterly 22, no. 2/3 (1976): 74–83.
- Bilby, Kenneth. "Calypso as a world music". Newsletter - Institute for Studies in American Music; Brooklyn; Vol. XXXIV; Issue 1 (Fall 2004): 4–5.
- Boxill, Ian. "The two faces of Caribbean music". Social and Economic Studies, Vol. 43, No. 2 (JUNE 1994), pp. 33–56 (24 pages). Published By: Sir Arthur Lewis Institute of Social and Economic Studies.
- Brown, Ernest. "Carnival, Calypso, and Steelband in Trinidad.". The Black Perspective in Music 18, no. 1/2 (1990): 81–100.
- Charles, C. N. (2016, November 22). Calypso music : identity and social influence : the Trinidadian experience. Retrieved from https://hdl.handle.net/1887/45260.
- Cowley, John. "Cultural 'Fusions': Aspects of British West Indian Music in the USA and Britain 1918-51.". Cambridge University Press, Popular Music, Vol.5, Continuity and Change, pp. 81–96 (1985).
- Cowley, John Houston. "Music & migration: Aspects of black music in the British Caribbean, the United States, and Britain, before the independence of Jamaica and Trinidad & Tobago". University of Warwick (April 1992).
- Cowley, John Houston. "West Indian Gramophone Records in Britain: 1927-1950". Occasional Papers In Ethnic Relations, No. l, Centre for Research in Ethnic Relations, Coventry (April 1985).
- Crowley, Daniel. "Towards a definition of calypso (Part II)." Ethnomusicology, Vol. 3, No. 3 (Sep 1959), pp. 117–124 (8 pages). Published by: University of Illinois Press.
- Floyd, Samuel A. "Black music in the Circum-Caribbean". University of Illinois Press, 1999, volume 17, number 1, pages 1–38.
- Liverpool, Hollis (Mighty Chalkdust). "Researching steelband and calypso music in the British Caribbean and the U. S. Virgin Islands". Black Music Research Journal (1994).
- Rampaul, Giselle. "Shakespeare, Empire, and the Trinidad Calypso". Borrowers and Lenders: The Journal of Shakespeare and Appropriation (2015), Volume 9, number 2.
- Regis, Louis "Gordon Rohlehr's forty years in calypso". Caribbean Journal of Cultural studies. Volume 2, number 1 (October 2013). The University of the West Indies.

=== Articles ===
- Bowles, Paul. "Calypso - Music of the Antilles". Modern Music, 1940, 17/3 154–159
- Brown Boy in the ring. "Carnival culture: Lord Kitchener to Machel Montano". March 22, 2007
- Dowrich-Phillips, Laura. "7 calypsoes that kept us entertained with hot topics of the day".
- Jacob, Debbie. "What calypso means to the Caribbean" Caribbean Beat Magazine, January 2011.
- Unknown. "'A chronology of selected songs by Mighty Sparrow that address social, political and topical themes".
- Unknown. "Celebrating our Calypso monarchs 1939–1980 T&T - History through the eyes of calypso". Trinidad & Tobago government, 2015/07.
- Unknown. "The golden age of Calypso". Musical Traditions, number 4, 1985.

=== Audio ===
- Calypso Breakaway (Record). Rounder Records Corporation, Cambridge, Massachusetts. 1990.
- Calypso Dreams (CD). In for a penny, in for a pound, LLC. Ice Music, Ltd. 2009.
- Calypso - Musical poetry in the Caribbean (1955 - 69) (CD). Soul Jazz records. 2014.
- Calypsos from Trinidad - Politics, intrigue & violence in the 1930s (CD). Arhoolie Prod., Inc. 1991.
