= List of calypso songs about cricket =

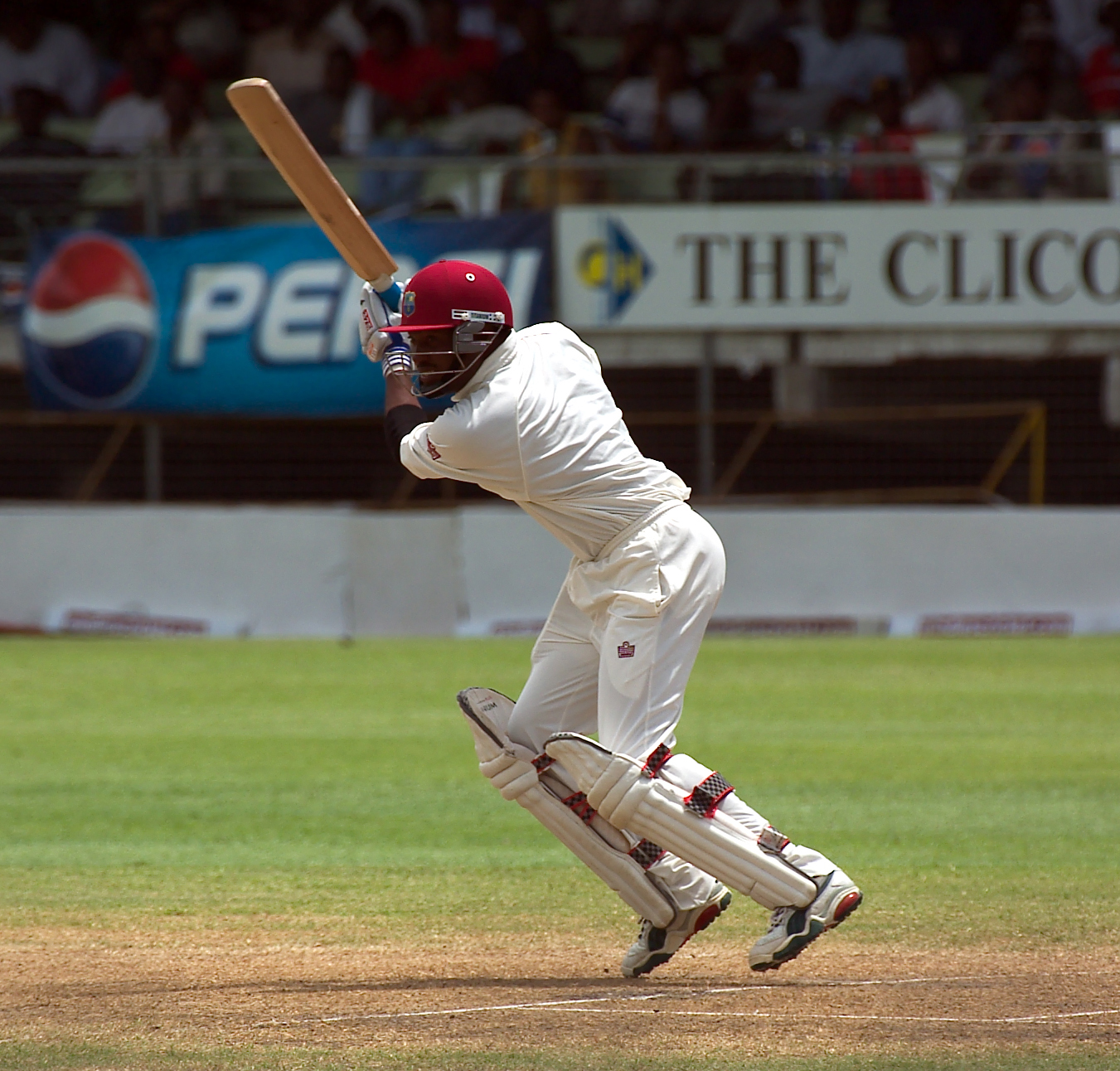
- Brian Lara

This is a list of calypso songs whose lyrics and themes are about cricket.

Cricket was introduced in the West Indies during the British Empire era and is now played all over that region. Calypso, an integral part of Trinidad and Tobago culture, chronicles and comments on many aspects of life locally and sometimes internationally. Cricket themed calypsos have brought together and annotated the triumphs and tribulations of West Indies cricket since the 1920s.

== 1920s ==
- "Constantine" (1929), Wilmoth Houdini
- "Intercolonial Cricket" (1929), Lord Inventor
- "Leary Constantine" (1929), Lord Beginner
- "M.C.C. versus the Colony/Trinidad" (1926), Atilla the Hun

== 1930s ==
- "Barbados and the M.C.C. - Barbados versus M.C.C." (1935), Ralph Fitz-Scott
- "Bodyline" (1936), King Radio - Humour/Pun
- "Bradman" (1930), Lord Executor
- "Cricketing Stars" (1933), Gerard Clark
- "Defeat of the MCC" (1935), Railway Douglas
- "Intercolonial Cricket" (1939), Lord Beginner
- "International Tournament" - "Intercolonial Tournament" (1937), Atilla the Hun
- "International Cricket Tournament" (1934), Bill Rogers
- "Leary Constantine" (1935), Railway Douglas
- "Leary Constantine" (1939), Lord Caresser
- "M.C.C. and the West Indies (The)" - "M.C.C. and Trinidad (The)" (1935), Lord Beginner
- "Mickey Cipriani’s Career" - "Mickey Cipriani" (1934), Wilmoth Houdini
- "They Say I Reign Too Long" (1938), Lord Executor - Contains a reference to cricket
- "Tiger Tom Kill Tiger Cat" (1932), Wilmoth Houdini

== 1940s ==
- "All Hail for Constantine" (1940's), Lord Beginner
- "Chinese Cricket Match" (1947), Mighty Viking - Humour/Pun
- "Constantine" (1945), Atilla the Hun
- "Female Cricketer (The)" (1948), Mighty Dictator - Humour/Pun
- "We Want a Body Line in Trinidad" (1941), Lord Pretender

== 1950s ==
- "Alec Bedser Calypso" (1953), Lord Kitchener
- "Ashes (The)" - "Australia vs. M.C.C. 1955" (1955), Lord Kitchener
- "Australia Cricket Tour" (1952), King Radio
- "Australia vs. West Indies" (1952), Lord Beginner
- "Battle of the Century" (1957), Frank Holder
- "Collie Smith" - "Tribute to Collie Smith" (1959), Laurel Aitken
- "Cricket" (1950s), Young Tiger
- "Coloured Cricket" (1956), Mighty Cypher - Commentary on race
- "Cricket Calamity" (1955), King Fighter
- "Cricket Champions" - "West Indies vs. M.C.C. 1954" (1954), Lord Beginner
- "Cricket Umpires" (1954), Lord Kitchener
- "Dem Berbicians" (1950's), King Fighter
- "Denis Compton" (1951), Lord Kitchener
- "England Regain the Ashes" (1953), Lord Beginner
- "English Bat and Ball Player (The)" (1951), Mighty Terror
- "Hassett and Ramadhin" (1951), Sammy Guillen - Created and sung by a cricketer
- "Hell’s Cricket Match" (1958), Lord Beginner
- "John Goddard" (1950), Lord Beginner
- "Kitch’s Cricket Calypso" - "Cricket Calypso" - "1950 Victory" (1950), Lord Kitchener
- "Learie Constantine" - "The Constantine Calypso" (1954), Cy Grant
- "Picking Sense From Nonsense" (1955), Mighty Spoiler - Contains reference to cricket
- "Ramadin" (1951), Lord Pretender
- "Ramadin on the Ball" - "We want Ramadin on the Ball" (1951), King Radio
- "Ramadin Spin Bowling Anchor" (1953), Mighty Viper
- "Victory Calypso" - "Victory Test Match" - "Cricket, Lovely Cricket" (1950), Lord Beginner
- "West Indies Test Victory at Lord’s" (1951), Small Island Pride
- "West Indies versus England" (1951), Lord Invader
- "West Indies versus England" (1951), Lord Melody
- "Why the West Indies Lost to Australia" (1952), Lord Pretender

== 1960s ==
- "Collie Smith" (1960), Brother Superior
- "Cricket Champions" (1967), Lord Kitchener
- "Cricket Excitement" (1966), Terry Nelson
- "Cricket Song (The)" - "- Bowl Griffith" (1964), Lord Kitchener
- "Cut Throat Sobers" (1969), Mighty Terror
- "Final Test Decision" (1960's), Count Lasher
- "Garfield Sobers" (1960), Lord Pretender
- "Greatest Test Match (The)" (1961), Lord Pretender
- "King Cricket (Sobers)" (1966), Cy Grant
- "Learie Constantine" (1962), Black Stalin
- "Lord Constantine" (1969), Brother Superior
- "Mike Findlay" - "Tribute to Mike Findlay" (1969), Becket
- "Night Cricket" (1960), Lord Tanamo - Humour/Pun
- "Riot in the Oval (Don’t Doubt me)" (1960), Lord Brynner - News event
- "Riot at the Oval (Bacchanal)" (1960), Lord Smiley - News event
- "Sir Garfield Sobers" (1966), Mighty Sparrow
- "Tribute to Gary Sobers" (1966), Count Lasher
- "Tribute to Learie Constantine" (1962), Mighty Terror
- "Tribute to Sir Frank" (1968), All Rounder
- "Independence" - "Trinidad and Tobago Independence" - "Independence Calypso" - "Our Nation" (1962), Lord Brynner - Includes one verse with cricket reference
- "V for Victory" (1967), Young Growler
- "West Indies Cricket Test" (1964), Laurel Aitken
- "Wicked Cricket Match" - "Single Wicket Competition" (1968), Lord Canary - Humour/Pun
- "Worrell’s Captaincy" (1963), Jackie Opel

== 1970s ==
- "Ah Put on My Guns Again" (1976), Chalkdust - Contains a verse referring to cricket
- "Andy Roberts" - "Tribute to Andy Roberts" (1973), Calypso Franco
- "Bomb (The)" (1974), - News event
- "Bowl Dem Fruity" (1978), Mighty Swallow
- "Boyhood Days" (1975), Tradewinds - Some references to cricket
- "Clive Lloyd" - "Tribute to Clive Lloyd" (1976), Singing Francine
- "Combine Islands" (1975), Mighty Swallow
- "Cricket Commentary" (1978), Crazy
- "Cricket Game (The)" (1976), The Sparks - Humour/Pun
- "Cricket Series" - "Female Cricket Series" (1972), Mighty Bomber - Humour/Pun
- "Cricket Victory ‘76" (1976), Frank Holder
- "Garry Sobers" (1971), The Merrymen
- "Gavascar" - "Indian Cricketers" (1972), Lord Relator
- "Election Cricket Game" (1976), Mighty Swallow - Political commentary
- "Kerry Packer (Ah Say Ban Dem)" (1978), Mighty Sparrow
- "Kerry Packer (I Met Sir Frank)" (1978), All Rounders
- "Knock Them Down" (1977), Maestro
- "Learie Constantine" (1971), Lord Pretender
- "Lord Constantine" (1972), Lord Blakie
- "One Day Cricket" (1977), All Rounder - Humour/Pun
- "Tribute to Constantine" (1972), Tangler
- "Vivi Richards" - "Tribute to Vivi Richards" (1975), Mighty Swallow
- "Vivian Richards" (1976), King Short Shirt
- "Water Lillee" (1976), Lord Kitchener
- "West Indian Alphabet" (1974), Tradewinds - Includes reference to cricket
- "West Indians Are Back in Town" (1976), West Indies Touring Team
- "West Indies vs India" (1972), Sagar Sookraj
- "Where Are your Heroes" (1973), Tradewinds - Includes references to cricket heroes
- "Willett" (1974), Mighty Swallow
- "World Cup (Cypher Was Oversea)" (1976), Mighty Cypher
- "World Cup (Phase One)" (1976), Maestro
- "World Cup Champions" (1976), Regeneration Now

== 1980s ==
- "Blackwash" (1985), Roots Man
- "Blood Money" (1986), Commenter - Commentary on West Indian cricketers playing in South Africa during apartheid
- "Calypso Cricket" (1988), Chalkdust - Commentary on the evolution of calypso
- "Clive Lloyd" (1985), Lord Have Mercy
- "Combine" (1981), Becket
- "Cricket in the Sun" (1985), Tradewinds
- "Cricket Soca Fever" (1983), Val Mason
- "Cricket Song (The) - Come, Go See the West Indies" (1980), Clayton Davis
- "Crickitics" (1987), Luta
- "Hit It" (1981), Mighty Gabby - Humour/Pun
- "Honorary White" (1983), Mighty Swallow - Commentary on West Indian cricketers playing in South Africa during apartheid
- "Rally 'Round the West Indies" (1988), David Rudder
- "Reason (The)" (1983), Short Pants - Commentary on West Indian cricketers playing in South Africa during apartheid
- "Richie Richardson" (1989), King Progress
- "Screws" (1989), Becket - Humour/Pun
- "South Africa" (1983), Tobago Crusoe - Commentary on West Indian cricketers playing in South Africa during apartheid
- "Stranger Man" (1985), Becket - Includes a reference to cricket in one verse
- "We are the Champions" (1985), Tradewinds
- "We Love Cricket but we Hate Apartheid" (1985), Brother Mudada - Commentary on West Indian cricketers playing in South Africa during apartheid

== 1990s ==
- "100 for 6" (1997), Melanie Hudson - News event
- "Ah Ready" (1996), Lord Contender
- "Ban for Life" (1990), King Progress - Commentary on West Indian cricketers playing in South Africa during apartheid
- "Bankie’s Son" (1999), David Rudder
- "Bat On" (1997), Brother Marvin
- "Bat on Lara" (1999), De Alberto
- "Beyond the Boundary" (1992), MBA - Commentary on cricket during apartheid
- "Big up the West Indies" (1997), Dread and the Baldhead
- "Brian Lara" (1995), Watchman
- "Caribbean Party" (1993), David Rudder
- "Celebrate" - "Celebration" (1995), Denyse Plummer
- "Chanderpaul" (1998), Terry Gajraj
- "Clean Sweep" (1990), Becket
- "Coconut Cricket" (1999), Abbi Blackman
- "Courtney" (1999), Black Stalin
- "Cover yuh Head" (1991), Speedy - Includes reference to cricket. About birth control
- "Curtly Ambrose" (1993), Calypso Douglas
- "Curtly Ambrose" (1995), Lord Relator
- "Don’t Bowl meh too Hard" (1998), Karla Gonzales - Humour/Pun
- "Four Lara Four" - "Laramania" (1995), Defosto
- "Gie Dem Shiv" (1997), Tradewinds
- "Gravy" (1990), King Progress
- "Hands Up" (1999), Tonic Band
- "Here Come the West Indies" (1994), David Rudder
- "Is Only Sport" (1995), Kurt Allen
- "King Lara" (1994), Count Robin
- "Knock Dem Down" (1992), David Rudder
- "Lara" (1994), DeLamo
- "Lara Prince of Plunder" (1995), Watchman
- "Lara Promenade" (1995), Magruff
- "Laramania" (A Pretty Pretty Senorita ...) (1994), All Rounder
- "Laramania" (The whole Caribbean Went Wild ...) (1994), Becket
- "Lash Dem Lara" (1994), Alexander D. Great
- "Legacy" (1995), David Rudder
- "Like Lara" (1995), Richard MacIntosh
- "My Hero" (1995), Hollis Wright
- "Ninja Caught Behind" (1993), Flyin Turkey
- "One Gone Again" (1993), All Rounder
- "Pace in yuh Waist" (1994), Tony Wilson
- "Prodigal" (1996) - DeLamo - Commentary on emigration
- "Rebels" (1992), Mighty Gabby - Commentary on West Indian cricketers playing in South Africa during apartheid
- "Reunite our Cricket Team" (1992), King Short Shirt
- "Scamps Like These" (1998), Heather MacIntosh - Commentary on West Indian cricketers playing in South Africa during apartheid
- "Signal to Lara" (1995), Superblue
- "Support the West Indies" (1997), Alexander D Great
- "Up and Away Lara" (1995), Delamo & Gypsy(Extempo)
- "We Coming Back" (1996), Bally
- "We Coming Back" (1999), Becket
- "West Indian Cricket" (1999), De Mighty Trini
- "West Indies I Feel the Pain" (1998), Alicia Pamponette
- "West Indies Warriors" (1996), Kurt Allen

== 2000s ==
- "20th Century" (2000), Andre Williams - Contains some references to cricket
- "Answer de Call" (2001), Sanell Dempster & Sean Paul
- "Are you There" (2001), Alison Hinds
- "Bigger Better Cricket" (2005), Alison Hinds
- "Brian Lara" (2008), Fashion Police
- "Champions" (2007), David Rudder
- "Charles Brian" (2006), D Dozie
- "Come Rise with me" (2007), Machel Montano & Claudette Peters
- "Cricket" - "It’s Over" (2007), David Rudder
- "Cricket is we Ting" (2007), Becket
- "Cricket Lovely Cricket in Guyana" (2007), Terry Gajraj
- "De Call" (2006), Calypso Kerr
- "Everybody Love Courtney" (2000), Becket
- "Game of Love and Unity" (2007), Shaggy
- "Get in de Game" (2004), Machel Montano
- "He Strikes Again" - "Lara" (2005), De Fosto
- "Hold on to Cricket" (2005), Dice
- "Hooper and Chanderpaul" (2001), Tradewinds
- "ICC Champs" (2004), Relator
- "It’s a West Indian Thing" - "Bounce" (2006), David Rudder
- "Lara Again" (2004), Becket
- "Lara Touch" (2007), Tobago Chalkie
- "Legacy (The)" - "Lara" (2006), Tallish
- "Lifted" (2007), David Rudder
- "Live the Passion" (2003), Rupee
- "Lovely Day" (2007), David Rudder
- "Malcolm Marshall" (2000), Mighty Gabby
- "Play Ball" (2006), Mighty Lingo
- "Prince of Port of Spain (The)" (2007), Rootsman
- "Sir Gary" (2002), Mighty Gabby
- "Smiling Eyes of Steel" (2000), David Rudder
- "Song for Lara" (2005), Kia Panman
- "Stroke it" (2001), Red Plastic Bag - Humour/Pun
- "Tanty Merle" (2007), Abbi Blackman
- "Two Great Bowlers" (2003), Sugar Aloes
- "Understanding is the Problem" (2009), Alpha
- "We are Back" (2005), Heather MacIntosh
- "Welcome" (2007), Becket
- "West Indies Forever" (2004), Rootsman
- "West Indies Forever" (2007), Becket
- "West Indies Forever" (2007), Gino McKoy
- "West Indies Now and Forever" (2004), Alison Hinds
- "West Indies Posse" (2004), King Punkwa
- "WICB Take a Rest" (2008), Tradewinds
- "World Cup Cricket" (2007), Anderson ‘Blood’ Armstrong

== 2010s ==
- "Ah Feel for Gayle" (2016), Cro Cro
- "Bowl mih" (2011), Sanell Dempster & Buffy - Humour/Pun
- "Champion" (2016), DJ Bravo
- "Chanderpaul" (2010), De Alberto
- "Chanderpaul" (2013), B. Deokarran
- "Cricketer (The)" (2016), Snakey - Humour/Pun
- "D Oval" (2011), D Dozie
- "Do Blush Baby" (2016), Happy - News event
- "How we Play" (2013), Kes (band)
- "Lash dem Learie" (2010), Alexander D Great
- "Make me Believe Again" (2016), Kendal John
- "We Are the West Indies" (2011), Tian Winter
- "West Indies Cricket" (2012), Alison Hinds

== 2020s to present ==
- "Cricket Song (The)" (2024), Drupatee
- "Franchise Cricket" (2024), Helen Jones of Trinbago
- "I love you as much as cricket" (2024), John Adam
- "No Entry" (2020), Maria Bhola
- "Out of this World" (2024), Kes (band) & Sean Paul

== See also ==
- Calypso music: Sociopolitical influence
- Poetry about cricket

== Sources ==
=== Books ===
- Abrahams, Roger D. (1983). The Man-of-words in the West Indies: Performance and the Emergence of Creole Culture. Johns Hopkins University Press. ISBN 978-0801828386.
- Attaway, William (2011). Calypso Song Book: Authentic Folk Music Of The Caribbean. Literary Licensing, LLC. ISBN 978-1258122133.
- Balliger, Robin (2000). Noisy Spaces: Popular Music Consumption, Social Fragmentation, and the Cultural Politics of Globalization in Trinidad. Stanford University. ISBN 978-0493085357.
- Bilby, Kenneth M. (1985). The Caribbean as a Musical Region. Latin American Program, Woodrow Wilson International Center for Scholars.
- Dudley, Shannon (2004). Carnival music in Trinidad : Experiencing music, expressing culture. New York. ISBN 0-19-513833-3. OCLC 51607410.
- Gibbs, Craig Martin (2015). Calypso and other music of Trinidad, 1912-1962 : An annotated discography. Jefferson, North Carolina. ISBN 978-1-4766-1931-6. OCLC 908763141.
- Khan, Nasser (2024). History of West Indies cricket through calypsoes. Trinidad and Tobago: Eniath’s Printing Company. ISBN 978-976-95703-6-8.
- Liverpool, First1=Hollis (Mighty Chalkdust) (June 1, 1987). Calypsonians to remember. Virgin Islands Commission. ISBN 0937421022.
- Liverpool, Hollis (2003). From the horse's mouth : An analysis of certain significant aspects in the development of the calypso and society as gleaned from personal communication with some outstanding calypsonians. Diego Martin, Trinidad: Juba Publications. ISBN 976-8194-13-8. OCLC 53795321.
- Liverpool, Hollis (1986). Kaiso and society. Charlotte Amalie, St. Thomas, V.I.: Virgin Islands Commission on Youth. OCLC 19282261.
- Luis, Robert (1960). Authentic Calypso, the Song, the Music, the Dance. Latin American Institute Press.
- Maharaj, George D. (2004). The roots of calypso, volume 1 - A short passage into the world of calypso. [Toronto]: G.D. Maharaj. ISBN 0-9734904-0-3. OCLC 57405250.
- Maharaj, George D. (2007). The Roots of Calypso, Volume 2 - Another passage into the world of calypso. Trinidad and Tobago Hi Tech Printers Inc. Ltd.
- Mighty Sparrow (1963). One hundred and Twenty Calypsos to remember. Caribbean Printers.
- Nurse (2007). Unheard voices : The rise of steelband and calypso in the Caribbean and North America. New York: iUniverse. ISBN 978-0-595-40153-6. OCLC 137751788.
- Pierre, Giselle (2016). Calypso chronicles: history through calypso I. CreateSpace Independent Publishing Platform. ISBN 9781508436201.
- Pierre, Giselle (2021). Calypso chronicles: history through calypso II. Independently Published. ISBN 979-8548539021.
- Quevedo, Raymond (Atilla the Hun) (1983). Attila's kaiso: A short history of Trinidad Calypso. St. Augustine, Trinidad & Tobago, West Indies: University of the West Indies, Dept. of Extra Mural Studies.
- Rohlehr, Gordon (1990). Calypso & society in pre-independence Trinidad. Port of Spain, Trinidad. ISBN 976-8012-52-8. OCLC 23928095.
- Warner, Keith Q. (1982). Kaiso! The Trinidad calypso: A study of the calypso as oral literature. Washington, D.C. ISBN 0-89410-025-4. OCLC 8762968.

=== Journals ===
- Austin, Roy. "Understanding Calypso Content: A Critique and an Alternative Explanation". Caribbean Quarterly 22, no. 2/3 (1976): 74–83.
- Bilby, Kenneth. "Calypso as a world music". Newsletter - Institute for Studies in American Music; Brooklyn; Vol. XXXIV; Issue 1 (Fall 2004): 4–5.
- Boxill, Ian. "The two faces of Caribbean music". Social and Economic Studies, Vol. 43, No. 2 (JUNE 1994), pp. 33–56 (24 pages). Published By: Sir Arthur Lewis Institute of Social and Economic Studies.
- Brown, Ernest. "Carnival, Calypso, and Steelband in Trinidad.". The Black Perspective in Music 18, no. 1/2 (1990): 81–100.
- Burton, Richard. "Cricket, carnival and street culture in the Caribbean". Taylor & Francis online, Routledge Online Studies on the Olympic and Paralympic Games, Issue 2: Sporting Sounds 2 (2007): 179–197.
- Charles, C. N. (2016, November 22). Calypso music : identity and social influence : the Trinidadian experience. Retrieved from https://hdl.handle.net/1887/45260.
- Cowley, John. "Cultural 'Fusions': Aspects of British West Indian Music in the USA and Britain 1918-51.". Cambridge University Press, Popular Music, Vol.5, Continuity and Change, pp. 81–96 (1985).
- Cowley, John. "London is the Place: Caribbean Music in the Context of Empire 1900-60.". Paul Oliver, ed. Black Music In Britain: Essays on the Afro Asian Contribution to Popular Music, Milton Keynes, Open University Press, pp. 57–76 (1990).
- Cowley, John Houston. "Music & migration: Aspects of black music in the British Caribbean, the United States, and Britain, before the independence of Jamaica and Trinidad & Tobago". University of Warwick (April 1992).
- Cowley, John Houston. "West Indian Gramophone Records in Britain: 1927-1950". Occasional Papers In Ethnic Relations, No. l, Centre for Research in Ethnic Relations, Coventry (April 1985).
- Crowley, Daniel. "Towards a definition of calypso (Part II)." Ethnomusicology, Vol. 3, No. 3 (Sep 1959), pp. 117–124 (8 pages). Published by: University of Illinois Press.
- Floyd, Samuel A. "Black music in the Circum-Caribbean". University of Illinois Press, 1999, volume 17, number 1, pages 1–38.
- Liverpool, Hollis (Mighty Chalkdust). "Researching steelband and calypso music in the British Caribbean and the U. S. Virgin Islands". Black Music Research Journal (1994).
- Midgett, Douglas. "Cricket and calypso: Cultural representation and social history in the West Indies". Taylor & Francis online, Routledge Online Studies on the Olympic and Paralympic Games, Issue 2-3: Sporting Sounds 6 (2010): 239–268.
- Rampaul, Giselle. "Shakespeare, Empire, and the Trinidad Calypso". Borrowers and Lenders: The Journal of Shakespeare and Appropriation (2015), Volume 9, number 2.
- Regis, Louis "Gordon Rohlehr's forty years in calypso". Caribbean Journal of Cultural studies. Volume 2, number 1 (October 2013). The University of the West Indies.
- Rohlehr, Gordon "Calypso, literature and West Indian cricket: Era of dominance". Anthurium, vol. 6, no. 1, 2008.
- Westall, Claire. "Chapter 13 - ‘This thing goes beyond the boundary’: Cricket, calypso, the Caribbean and their heroes". Taylor & Francis online, Routledge Online Studies on the Olympic and Paralympic Games, Issue 35: Sporting Sounds 1 (2012): 222–236.
- Winer, Lise. "Socio-cultural change and the language of calypso". Nieuwe West-Indische Gids / New West Indian Guide 60, no. 3/4 (1986): 113–48.

=== Articles ===
- Biswas, Soutik. "Calypso’s love affair with cricket". BBC News, 2007, 17/3 154–159
- Bowles, Paul. "Calypso - Music of the Antilles". Modern Music, 1940, 17/3 154–159
- Brown Boy in the ring. "Carnival culture: Lord Kitchener to Machel Montano". March 22, 2007
- Deboo, Rustom. "Specials - Five classic cricket calypsos". 2017
- Dowrich-Phillips, Laura. "7 calypsoes that kept us entertained with hot topics of the day".
- Jacob, Debbie. "What calypso means to the Caribbean" Caribbean Beat Magazine, January 2011.
- Khan, Nasser. "Cricket and calypso.".Stabroek News, January 2024.
- Martin, Ali. "Calypso Kings: how David Rudder created the West Indies' anthem" The Guardian, June 2020.
- Unknown. "'16 great calypso songs for teaching", Study Assistant .
- Unknown. "'A chronology of selected songs by Mighty Sparrow that address social, political and topical themes".
- Unknown. "Celebrating our Calypso monarchs 1939–1980 T&T - History through the eyes of calypso". Trinidad & Tobago government, 2015/07.
- Unknown. "The golden age of Calypso". Musical Traditions, number 4, 1985.

=== Audio ===
- Calypso Breakaway (Record). Rounder Records Corporation, Cambridge, Massachusetts. 1990.
- Calypso Dreams (CD). In for a penny, in for a pound, LLC. Ice Music, Ltd. 2009.
- Calypso - Musical poetry in the Caribbean (1955 - 69) (CD). Soul Jazz records. 2014.
- Calypsos from Trinidad - Politics, intrigue & violence in the 1930s (CD). Arhoolie Prod., Inc. 1991.
