= Kenny J =

Trinidad and Tobago calypsonian (1952–2022)

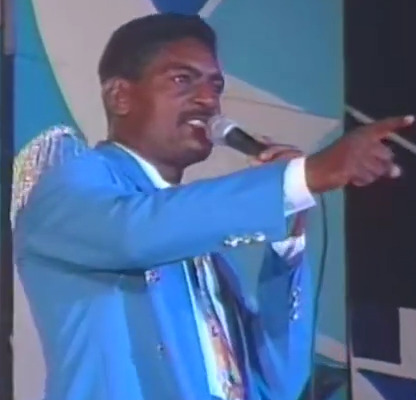
- Kenny J at Dimanche Gras 1993
- Born: Kenwrick Joseph; 15 July 1952; San Fernando, Trinidad and Tobago
- Died: 2 January 2022 (aged 69); Pointe-à-Pierre, Trinidad and Tobago
- Occupation: Calypsonian

Kenwrick Joseph (15 July 1952 – 2 January 2022), known professionally as Kenny J, was a Trinidad and Tobago calypsonian and Assistant Superintendent of Police who was best known for his soca parang hits, including "The Paint Brush".

== Musical career ==
Kenny J sang ballads before venturing to calypso and later soca parang, for which he became best known. He won the National Police Service Calypso Monarch in 1987 and then began performing professionally. He made it to the finals of the National Calypso Monarch competition four times. One of his best performances was in 1990 when he placed second performing "Addicted to Sweet Soca" and "Leave She Alone".

He began performing soca parang in 1993 and released "The Paint Brush", which was described as "an instant hit" and "an evergreen classic". Other successes in the 1990s included "Alexander" and "Hush Yuh Mout", which "guaranteed Kenny J work during the Christmas season for over two decades".

== Musical style and impact ==
Kenny J was described as a pioneer of parang soca by Marcia Miranda, a fellow parang soca singer. She described his songwriting as "witty" and memorable. Newsday columnist Yvonne Webb described his "well-crafted, risqué parang soca contributions" as his most lasting contributions. In response to his death, Leader of the Opposition Kamla Persad-Bissessar described Kenny J as "a true cultural icon". Minister of Tourism, Culture and the Arts Randall Mitchell described him as "a performer par excellence and a cultural icon".

Gordon Rohlehr contrasted the reception that Kenny J received as a public servant with the harassment experienced by calypsonian Chalkdust in 1968 when it was revealed that he was a schoolteacher. While Chalkdust was criticised severely by the government for holding a second job (which was forbidden for people in the public service), later calypsonians like Kenny J were able to avoid this criticism thanks to Chalkdust's effective push-back to the selective application of the policy.

Kenny J, who was Dougla (of mixed African and Indian ancestry), is discussed by Ferne-Louanne Regis as one of only three Dougla calypsonians (the others being the Mighty Dougla and Brother Marvin) to discuss this aspect of their identity in their creative work.

In "Baboolal", Kenny J tells the story of a failed relationship from the context of a man who does not understand why his wife left him, and from the position of a narrator who references the man's domestic violence against his wife. In her analysis of gender negotiations in chutney soca, Aisha Mohammed fits "Baboolal" into both the tradition of Indian folk songs about heartbreak, and the context of domestic violence in Indo-Trinidadian culture.

== Personal life and death ==
Kenny J was born on Prince of Wales Street in San Fernando, on 15 July 1952 and attended St. Benedict's College. He retired from the Police Service with the rank of Assistant Superintendent.

He was a resident of Siparia, in south Trinidad. Despite being known for his Christmas music, he found Christmas a "bittersweet experience" after the death of his wife on 26 December 2010. Kenny J died from COVID-19 on 2 January 2022, at the age of 69. His daughter reported that he was fully vaccinated, and had participated in a series of public service announcements encouraging people to get vaccinated.
