= List of Dougla people =

This is a list of notable Dougla people. For an entry, the person needs to have a Wikipedia article in which the Afro-Indo-Caribbean heritage needs to be stated and sourced.

== Community Involvement ==
- Amy Ashwood Garvey (1897−1969, Pan-African activist and entrepreneur)
- Gema Ramkeesoon (1910−1999, social worker and women's rights activist)
- Katharine Birbalsingh (born 1973, education reform advocate)
- Abrahim Simmonds (born 1994, youth activist)

== Culture ==
=== Theatre, literature, pageantry, and fashion ===
- David Chariandy (born 1969, writer)
- Masaba Gupta (born 1989, fashion designer)
- Toni-Ann Singh (born 1996, beauty pageant)
- Clémence Botino (born 1997, beauty pageant)
- Mary Rambaran-Olm (literary scholar)
- Rajendra Ramoon Maharaj (theatre director and playwright)

=== Movies/Television ===
- Trevor McDonald (born 1939, TV presenter)
- Esther Anderson (born 1943, filmmaker, photographer and actress)
- Jeffery Kissoon (born 1947, actor)
- Nicole Narain (born 1974, model)
- Tatyana Ali (born 1979, actress)
- Nick Sagar (born 1988, actor)
- Sean Sagar (born 1990, actor)
- Dominic Kalipersad (journalists)

=== Music ===
- Mighty Dougla (calypsonian)
- Kenny J (1952−2022, calypsonian)
- Super Cat (born 1963, DJ)
- Diana King (born 1970, singer-songwriter)
- Special Ed (born 1972, rapper)
- Foxy Brown (born 1978, rapper)
- Nicki Minaj (born 1982, rapper)
- Melanie Fiona (born 1983, singer)
- Justine Skye (born 1995, singer-songwriter)
- Lord Kossity (born 1972, singer)

== Politics and government ==
- Mervyn Dymally (1926–2012, politician)
- Tanya Chutkan (born 1962, lawyer)
- Kamala Harris (born 1964, politician)
- Marlene Malahoo Forte (born 1966, politician)
- Roxanne Persaud (born 1966, politician)
- Maya Harris (born 1967, policy advisor and lawyer)
- Johnson Beharry (born 1979, soldier)

== Sports ==
- Krishmar Santokie (born 1984, cricketer)
- Diego Biseswar (born 1988, footballer)
- Furdjel Narsingh (born 1988, footballer)
- Andre Rampersad (born 1995, footballer)
- Samuel Moutoussamy (born 1996, footballer)
