= Mighty Striker =

- Also known as: Striker
- Born: Percival Oblington; April 1930; D'Abadie, Trinidad
- Died: 5 February 2011 (aged 80)
- Genres: Calypso
- Years active: 1945–2010

Percival Oblington (April 1930 – 5 February 2011), better known as Mighty Striker, or simply Striker, was a Trinidadian calypsonian who twice won the Calypso King title.

== Career ==
Percival Oblington was born in 1930 in D'Abadie, Trinidad, the son of a blacksmith. He initially made a living as a coconut husker along with fellow calypsonians Mighty Cypher, Lord Montgomery, and his cousin Lord Eisenhower. He began performing in 1945 and became a professional calypso singer in 1949, performing as 'Striker' and 'Mighty Striker', a name given to him by his mentor Mighty Cypher in reference to his exploits as a boxer in his youth. In 1957 he reached the final of the Calypso King contest held as part of Trinidad's carnival, finishing third behind Lord Pretender and the Mighty Spoiler. He won the title the following year with "Don't Blame The PNM" (Striker was a supporter of Eric Williams' People's National Movement party) and "Can't Find A Job To Suit Me", and became the first person to retain the title in 1959 with "Ban The Hula Hoop" and "Comparison". He finished third in 1960 behind Mighty Sparrow and Lord Melody and feeling that he had been robbed of a third title did not enter the contest again. In 1965 he won the 'Buy Local Calypso' competition, a contest introduced by the country's government. Striker continued to perform regularly in the Kaiso Karavan calypso tent.

By the late 1970s his popularity had faded and he worked as a taxi driver. He returned to performance in 2002 for the documentary Calypso Dreams, which included one of his best known songs, "Grandfather's Clock".

Oblington researched the history of calypso, with his book The True History of Calypso published in 2000.

His last performance was in July 2010 at the Ministry of Arts and Multiculturalism's NAPA FEST.

He died on 5 February 2011, aged 80, after suffering from prostate cancer.
