= Jump in the Line (Shake, Senora) =

Song by Harry Belafonte

from the album Jump Up Calypso
- Released: November 17, 1961
- Recorded: 1960
- Genre: Calypso
- Length: 3:39
- Label: RCA Victor
- Songwriter: Lord Kitchener
- Producer: Bob Bollard

Audio sample
- "Jump in the Line": file; help

"Jump in the Line (Shake, Senora)" is a calypso song composed by Lord Kitchener and best known from a version recorded by vocalist Harry Belafonte in 1961.

== Other renditions ==
Woody Herman and his Third Herd recorded Kitchener's song in 1952 for Mars Records; Herman's band recorded it live that same year with the title "Jump in Line."

Lord Invader released a cover of the song on the Folkways label in 1955, titled "Labor Day (Jump in the Line)". His rendition reached mento star Lord Flea, who in turn recorded a version based on Lord Invader's interpretation. It was released on August 1, 1958, by Capitol Records.

The song was recorded by Lord Fly and Joseph Spence in 1958. Fly's version inspired Harry Belafonte, who released his own take on November 17, 1961 (credited to his pseudonym Raymond Bell on the disc label). It was included on the album Jump Up Calypso.

The song was covered by the rock band Ash in 2025.

== Uses in other media ==
- The song is featured during the end of the 1988 Tim Burton comedy horror film Beetlejuice, in which character Lydia Deetz (portrayed by Winona Ryder) dances to it alongside the Maitlands (portrayed by Alec Baldwin and Geena Davis) while backed by a line of ghost football players.
- Belafonte's rendition went viral on video-sharing app TikTok in August 2019, without showing a significant increase in sales.

== Certifications ==
Certifications for "Jump in the Line (Shake, Senora)"
Region	Certification	Certified units/sales
United Kingdom (BPI)	Silver	200,000^{‡}
^{‡} Sales+streaming figures based on certification alone.
