= Hitler (disambiguation) =

Adolf Hitler (1889–1945) was the leader of Nazi Germany from 1933 to 1945.

Hitler may also refer to:

== Books ==
- Hitler: Speeches and Proclamations, a series compiling Adolf Hitler's speeches
- Hitler: A Study in Tyranny, a book by British historian Sir Alan Bullock, published in 1952, the first major biography in English about Adolf Hitler
- The Hitler Book, a 2005 publication based on a secret Soviet report about Adolf Hitler
- Hitler: A Short Biography, a 2012 short biography by A. N. Wilson about Adolf Hitler
- Hitler (Ullrich books), a two-volume biography of Adolf Hitler by Volker Ullrich
- Shigeru Mizuki's Hitler, a manga by Shigeru Mizuki
- Hitler (Kershaw books), a two-volume biography about Adolf Hitler by historian Ian Kershaw

== Film and television ==
=== Adolf Hitler ===
- Hitler (1962 film), a film starring Richard Basehart
- Hitler: A Film from Germany, a 1978 film co-produced by the BBC
- Hitler – Beast of Berlin, a 1939 film
- Hitler: The Last Ten Days, a 1973 film
- Hitler: The Rise of Evil, a 2003 TV series broadcast by CBS

=== Other films ===
- Hitler (1996 film), a Malayalam film
- Hitler (1997 film), a Telugu film
- Hitler och vi på Klamparegatan, a Swedish film starring Chatarina Larsson
- Meet the Hitlers, 2014 documentary film
- Hitler (2024 film), an Indian Tamil-language film

== Other uses ==
- Adolf Uunona, a Namibian politician originally named Adolf Hitler
- Adolf Hitler (calypso), a song
- Hitler (name), a surname, and a list of people with the name
- Hitler (retail store), the former name of a clothing store in Gujarat, India
- Kudowa-Zdrój–Náchod railway, nicknamed "Hitler's Railway"

== See also ==
- Hitler family
- Springtime for Hitler, the play in The Producers
- Hitler moustache
- Reductio ad Hitlerum, a logical fallacy in which an argument is connected to Hitler
- Hitler Didi, a 2011 Indian soap opera on Zee TV
- Elvis Hitler, an American psychobilly band
- Hilter, a municipality in Lower Saxony, Germany
- Mr. Hilter and the Minehead by-election, a Monty Python sketch
- Hiller (disambiguation)
