= Nookie =

Nookie may refer to:

== Human sexual activity ==
- Vulva
- Vagina
- Vaginal sexual intercourse, as a synecdoche

== Music ==
- "Nookie" (Limp Bizkit song), 1999
- "Nookie" (Jamesy P song), 2005
- "Nookie", a 2004 song by Jacki-O from the album Poe Little Rich Girl
- "Nookie", a 2019 song by D-Block Europe
- Nookie (Daria Stavrovich), ex-vocalist of Russian alternative metal band Slot
- Nooky, Indigenous Australian rapper, producer, & Triple J radio host

== Other ==
- Nookie Bear, a puppet used by British ventriloquist Roger De Courcey

== See also ==
- Dookie
- Pussy
