= Adolf Hitler (calypso) =

1941 song by Clifford Morris

Adolf Hitler is a calypso written and performed by Clifford Morris, better known as the Mighty Destroyer, winning the Calypso King competition at the Trinidad and Tobago Carnival of 1941, the last one before the end of World War II due to the danger of German submarine attacks in the Caribbean.

== Background ==
On April 8 of that year, Morris recorded the song, accompanied by Gerald Clark and his Caribbean Serenaders. In 1992 a cover version sung by Phillip Murray was issued on the anthology album Sing de Chorus – Calypso from Trinidad and Tobago. According to Trinidadian author Michael Anthony, "At one time 'Adolf Hitler' was on the lips of young and old alike, and regarded as one of the finest calypsoes of the era."

The lyrics deal with Hitler's insatiable hunger for conquest and world domination, mentions the French's and Spaniards' unsuccessful attempts to bring down the British Empire, points out America's support for Britain (almost a year before the United States' entrance into the war), calls Hitler an "Austrian jailbird" and predicts he would soon meet the same fate as Napoleon, spending his final years in exile on Saint Helena. The song is one of many calypso tunes referring to global politics of the era, as for example Lord Beginner's Chamberlain Says Peace (1939) and Run You Run, Hitler (1940), Attila the Hun's Send Hitler to St. Helena (1940), The Fall of France (1941) by The Growler, or a few years earlier Advantage Mussolini (1936) by the Roaring Lion and Selassie Is Held By The Police (1937) by The Caresser, both denouncing Italy's invasion of Ethiopia.
