= Mighty Terror =

Trinidadian calypsonian (1921–2007)

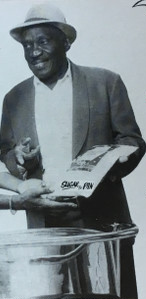
- Mighty Terror on the cover of Sugar For Pan '86

Background information
- Born: Fitzgerald Cornelius Henry; 13 January 1921
- Origin: Arouca, Trinidad
- Died: 14 March 2007 (aged 86)
- Genres: Calypso
- Occupations: Singer-songwriter, Trumpeter, Bassist, Drummer
- Instruments: Trumpet; Bass drums vocals
- Years active: 1947–2007
- Labels: SaGomes; Christopher; Dial; Melodisc; Nixa; Pye

Fitzgerald Henry (13 January 1921 – 14 March 2007), better known as the Mighty Terror, was a Trinidadian calypsonian.

== Early career in Trinidad ==
He was born Fitzgerald Cornelius Henry in Anguilla Village, Arouca, Trinidad. he studied trumpet as a child and also sang in church and school choirs. His career started in 1947, and following the success of his "Negroes Know Thyself" he debuted at the Calypso Palace Tent in 1948. He joined the Young Brigade Tent in 1949, where he continued playing until leaving Trinidad in 1953. In 1950 he his first 78 release was "Changing of the Indian Song".

During his time in Trinidad he recorded first for Sa Gomes (1951), for Christopher (1952) and took part in the Dial sessions in 1953. He was one of the first major calypsonians to have records released on Emil Shallit's UK-based Melodisc Records, in 1950.

== Move to England ==
In 1953, he took a job as a fireman on a ship and arrived in England later that year, going first to London. In his own words:

"I jump in a taxi and I say, Do you know of a gentleman called Lord Kitchener? I figure he popular and a taxi driver should know. He tell me he dead long time ago. Not that one (I said). This one is a calypsonian from the West Indies, Trinidad."

Popular or not, the taxi driver had not heard of Lord Kitchener so took him to a West Indian club where he was given the phone number of guitarist Fitzroy Coleman. Terror moved in with the Colemans and within a month he was regularly singing in the clubs and had won a contract to sing a jingle for the BBC.

He continued recording for Melodisc in 1954 (scoring a hit with "Chinese Children", and following it up with other releases for the label, including "The Emperor of Africa", "Chopping Wood" and "Chinee Children Call Me Daddy") and took part in the Nixa sessions in 1958 (these tracks being released by Pye Records). With the significant commercial success of 1957's "Life in London" and "I'll Walk a Million Miles", he was named "Calypso King of Great Britain" at a charity concert organised by Claudia Jones after attacks on the West London black community, which was a prelude to the now famous Notting Hill Carnival.

The time between 1958 and 1964 was spent touring, first with Lord Kitchener and later with the Bert McLean Trio.

== Return to Trinidad ==
Terror returned to Trinidad in 1965 and won the Calypso King crown in 1966. In April 1966, he represented Trinidad at the Festival of Negro Arts in Dakar, Senegal.

In 1985 his home country awarded him the Silver Hummingbird Medal for services to Calypso music.

The Mighty Terror performed in Trinidad into his old age.

In later life he became ill with cancer of the throat, and after an appeal by his wife Gloria, Pan Trinbago and the National Carnival Commission (NCC) agreed to foot the bill for Nursing Home care once he left hospital. Patrick Arnold of Pan Trinbago said, "We felt a responsibility to spare him the ignominy of an existence that would rob him of his dignity and decided to do something about it," while Kenny Da Silva of the NCC added, "You can't leave somebody like Terror to chance and to the vagaries of a life in an infirm condition in the winter of his years."

The Mighty Terror died aged 86 on 14 March 2007 as a result of throat cancer.

== Music and lyrics ==
Like most Calypso, the Mighty Terror's songs tell a story. Many of them contain a lot of innuendo and some surprisingly explicit themes for the time they were released. Examples of a number of his themes follow:

=== Personal life ===
"TV Calypso" - about buying his very first TV after being continually nagged by his wife and daughter.
"Patricia Gone With Millicent" - about his wife leaving him for a violent lesbian relationship.

=== Other calypsonians ===
"Kitch Cavalcade" - a tribute to Lord Kitchener.
"Calypso War" A tirade against "fake" calypsonians from Jamaica.

=== Social commentary ===
"Heading North" - about the racial discrimination in the Southern States of the U.S. at the time.
"Brownskin Gal" and "Jamaica Girl" - about the behaviour of American soldiers towards local girls in the Caribbean.

=== Pure humour ===
"Women Police in England" - about his efforts to get arrested by the "lovely blondy" policewoman he saw (inspired by Spoiler's "Women Police in Trinidad").

== Sources ==
- Mighty Terror from bestoftrinidad.com
- Sleevenotes from the CD release London In the Place For Me, Honest Jon's Records, 2002, catno: HJRCD2
- Tracks from the CD Kings Of Calypso, Pulse Records, 1997, catno: PLS CD 229.
