= DJ Puffy =

Barbadian disc jockey (born 1991)

- Born: November 20, 1991 (age 34); Barbados
- Occupation: Disc jockey

Andre Parris (born November 20, 1991), professionally known as DJ Puffy, is a Bajan disc jockey and 2016 winner of the Red Bull Music 3Style World DJ Championships. He competed as a wildcard entry in Santiago, Chile, making it the first time the Caribbean has ever been represented in the finals. It was the first time a Barbadian qualified and won a qualifying round. In addition to his Red Bull 3Style victory, Dj Puffy has achieved another significant milestone by winning the Culture Clash championship with the team "No Long Talk", making him the first and only person to hold titles in both major DJ competitions. His success in these events underscores his talent and dedication to DJing.

== Early life ==
Andre was born on November 20, 1991, in Barbados to Grenadian singer Denise Williams and Bajan Curtis Parris. He is said to have been interested in turntables from the age of seven, and credits having grown up in a musical household sparking his initial interest in music. Prior to entering the music industry, he was a model and tennis player

== Early career ==
While still at school, he began deejaying under the stage name DJ Puffy, which was a nickname he received as a pre-teen after attending a costume party dressed as American rapper Puff Daddy.

Before becoming a recognised entertainer, DJ Puffy began Prime Time, a long-running bi-weekly podcast featuring present and past hits, and potential chart-toppers from around the world. His major launch into the local spotlight came at a carnival party in 2010, when he acted as an emergency stand-in when organizers could not find a deejay. There, he captured the attention of event promoter Matthew “Fewwture” Ashby, who soon launched Dream Real Projects and signed him.

In 2012, DJ Puffy was included in the inaugural Caribbean DJ honours in Scarborough, Tobago before he went on to perform on the carnival circuit across the region.

His radio presence in Barbados was exclusive to Slam 101 FM up to 2016 when he gave up his prime time evening slot to perform his world tour.

== Red Bull Music 3Style World DJ Championship ==
On December 17, 2016, DJ Puffy entered and won the Red Bull 3style competition in the event's sixth year. It was the first year in which countries without national final events could be represented, making him the first Barbadian to enter, and the first deejay from the Caribbean to ever make it to the finals of the 3style competition.

In the qualifying stages, participants are required to showcase at least 3 different genres of music within a 15-minute set. Red Bull requires that deejays deliver their sets on "2 players (2 turntables or CDJs), 1 mixer and a maximum of 2 midi devices”. The 2016 competition judges were Nu Mark, Mix Master Mike, Jazzy Jeff, Z-Trip, Skratch Bastid and Craze.

DJ Puffy performed his set with a DJM S9 mixer and PLX 1000 turntables supplied for the finalists by Pioneer DJ. He told press he traveled only with his laptop and headphones, with his most lethal weapon to the competition being his “Caribbean music". He was among 21 national winners and three wildcard selections in competitive rounds, and won his round to advance to the grand final where he defeated finalists JFB (United Kingdom), Trapment (Canada), Beastmode (Australia) and You-Ki (Japan) at Estadio Nacional in Santiago

After winning 3style, DJ Puffy completed a tour across Europe as the 2016 world champion followed by an Asia tour, where he visited the Philippines, and Japan.

== Other competitions ==
Puffy was part of the winning time of Toronto's 24Hours/24DJS competition after being invited by Dr Jay de Soca Prince of Canada to join his team. The competition was streamed live by the Vibe105 radio station at York University in Toronto, Canada. Each DJ was given an hour to create a live exclusive mix, to be voted on by an online audience.

== Performances ==
In 2017, his mix for Destination Africa, a show with Nikita Chauhan & DJ Edu was aired on BBC 1Xtra and selected as one of the best guest mixes of 2017.

Also in 2017, during the Swizz Beatz initiative Art Basel in Miami DJ Puffy performed alongside Chronixx, Lil Wayne, Busta Rhymes, 2Chainz 6ix9ine and Stone Love.

In the Netherlands, DJ Puffy was announced as part of the Mysteryland 2017 lineup.

== Production work ==
Puffy's production work includes remixes for Caribbean soca artiste, Machel Montano, including Waves (2017) and Showtime (2018).

In August 2017, he released “Bangalang”, a reggaeton featuring Barbadian rapper Teff Hinkson, which reached international airwaves and was featured on BBC Music. DJ Puffy also appeared in the “Bangalang” music video.

== Other work ==
Since his 2016 Red Bull 3Style win, he has spoken about potential collaboration with Pioneer and Serato to facilitate workshops, deejay meets and deejay link-ups in Barbados

DJ Puffy was an official ambassador of Carifesta XIII, the Caribbean Festival of Arts and regularly performs on the Caribbean carnival circuit.
