= From a Logical Point of View =

From a Logical Point of View may refer to:

- From a Logical Point of View, a collection of papers by Willard Van Orman Quine, published in 1953
- "From a Logical Point of View", a song by Robert Mitchum from the 1957 album Calypso—is like so .... The song is a cover of "Ugly Woman" by Roaring Lion
