= Mighty Bomber =

Grenadian-born calypso singer (1928–2022)

Clifton Ryan
- Born: 30 January 1928; St. George's, Grenada
- Died: 1 January 2022 (aged 93); Port of Spain, Trinidad and Tobago
- Other name: Mighty Bomber
- Occupation: Calypsonian

Clifton Ryan (30 January 1928 – 1 January 2022), better known as the Mighty Bomber, was a Grenadian-born calypsonian from Trinidad and Tobago.

The name "The Mighty Bomber" was also used in the 1940s by Trinidadian Calypsonian Kenny Cooper.

== Early life ==
Clifton Ryan was born on 30 January 1928 in St. George's, Grenada, son of Fitzroy Ryan, an Anglican sexton originally from Belmont, Trinidad and Tobago, and Agatha Joseph, who was Grenadian. He migrated to Trinidad and Tobago in 1956. His brother, Samuel, also sang calypso, under the sobriquet King Solomon.

== Career ==
Bomber began singing calypso in Grenada, and won a national competition there in 1940 according to the National Action Cultural Committee. After migrating to Trinidad and Tobago in 1956, he began performing and had his first hit, "Gloria", in 1958. A version of "Gloria" was later recorded by Harry Belafonte. In 1960 he was invited by The Mighty Sparrow (Slinger Francisco) to join the Young Brigade calypso tent. He later managed selected line-ups of performers and managed shows for the Original Young Brigade and performed for Sparrow's Young Brigade and Kitchener's Revue. He retired from singing calypsos in 2007. Bomber was a protégé of The Mighty Spoiler and, like Spoiler, he was known for his use of humour in his compositions.

In 1964 Bomber won the Calypso Monarch competition, defeating Sparrow. He placed fourth in the Independence calypso competition in 1962 which was won by Lord Brynner (Kade Simon). Despite having Trinidad and Tobago citizenship through his father, Bomber believed that he would have done better had he been born in the country, saying in a 2012 interview "The people wanted Bomber. I was the People's Choice. It was felt I was not a citizen of T&T." Bomber represented Trinidad and Tobago in the Commonwealth Festival of Arts in Britain in 1963 and met Harry Belafonte after performing in the United States.

== Personal life and death ==
Bomber died on 1 January 2022, 29 days before his 94th birthday. At the time of his death, Bomber was the oldest living calypsonian, according to Mark John (calypsonian Composer), North Zone chairman of the Trinbago Unified Calypsonians' Organisation (TUCO), and one of only two survivors (along with Sparrow) of the Independence calypso competition.

== Achievements and honours ==
Bomber was one of the few calypsonians who beat Sparrow in competition and was described by Mark John as "one of the greatest composers in the artform". Calypsonian and ethnomusicologist Hollis Liverpool (Chalkdust) spoke of the role Bomber played in helping young calypsonians to learn the "rudiments of measurement, phrasing, melody and pitch ... One of Bomber's greatest contributions to calypso is correcting calypsonians".

He was ranked among the top 50 calypsonians of the twentieth century by TUCO. In 1976 he was granted a plot of land in Picton Hill, Laventille, by the government of Prime Minister Eric Williams in recognition of his contribution to calypso.

== Selected discography ==
- Calypso Jamboree (1966). Is one of his album title.
