= Schofield Pilgrim =

Schofield Pilgrim was a Barbadian jazz group of the late 20th century, most notable for helping to pioneer the calypso jazz genre. They collaborated with American jazz greats like Dizzy Gillespie, Duke Ellington and Charlie Parker.
