= Mighty Destroyer =

Trinidadian calypsonian

Donald Glasgow (died November 1944), better known as Mighty Destroyer, was a Trinidadian calypsonian who won the Calypso King contest in 1941.

Hailing from Chaguanas, Mighty Destroyer won the Calypso King title in 1941 with the song "Adolf Hitler". He died in November 1944, prompting a tribute song from fellow calypsonian Ziegfield.

Mighty Destroyer is considered one of the great early calypsonians.
