= Dr. Jay de Soca Prince =

Canadian radio show host

Jason Rosteing, known professionally as Dr. Jay de Soca Prince, is a Canadian DJ, radio show host, record producer, and promoter. He gained notoriety as the host of Soca Therapy, a weekly Toronto radio show broadcast on CFXJ-FM Flow 93.5 FM, and subsequently, CKFG-FM G98.7 FM. He is considered an icon in the Canadian Caribbean diaspora for playing soca music on mainstream radio, hosting large soca events in and around Toronto, and cultivating a thriving "soca scene" within the Greater Toronto Area.

== Early life ==
Jason Rosteing grew up in the Greater Toronto Area, and hailed from a family of mixed Caribbean heritage. His mother, Dianna Rosteing (1950-2022), was born in Georgetown, Guyana. His father, Michael Rosteing, was born in Trinidad. His uncle, Clive Rosteing, was a member of the Trinidadian calypso band, The Tradewinds. He has a younger sister, Myana.

Rosteing developed his interest in music due to the musical influence of his parents. His earliest memories include his father, who was a former musician, singing and dancing around him. His parents also showed him how to use record players as a young child.

Before becoming a radio personality, Rosteing wanted to become a social worker in order to make a difference in his community.

== Career ==
=== Radio ===
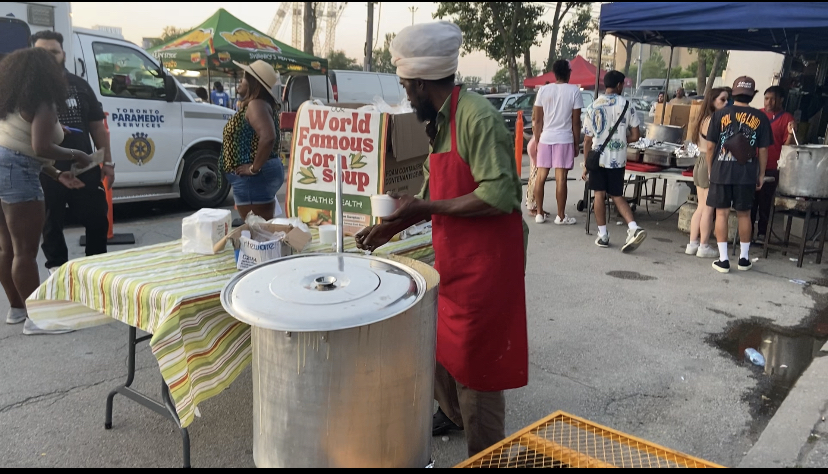
“Corn Soup Man,” one of the many Caribbean food vendors that parked their food stalls outside of Dr. Jay's Soca or Die in July 2023.

In 2001, Dr. Jay de Soca Prince began his career as a radio show host and DJ on Flow 93.5FM. Every Sunday evening from 6-8pm EST, Dr. Jay de Soca Prince played a combination of soca, calypso, and kaiso - alongside other genres of Caribbean music - on his show, Soca Therapy. On February 2, 2011, Soca Therapy was taken off the airwaves alongside other popular radio shows due to CTV's purchase of Flow 93.5FM.

Soca Therapy shortly found its new home on Fitzroy Gordon's new radio station, G 98.7 FM, four months later. However, on January 24, 2014, Dr. Jay de Soca Prince announced his resignation. On March 23, 2014, Soca Therapy was back on the Toronto airwaves via CHRY 105.5 FM.

On October 28, 2020, Dr. Jay de Soca Prince returned to Flow 93.5. FM. He continued on as a radio show host and DJ for Soca Therapy until Flow 93.5 FM was sold to G 98.7 FM on February 14, 2022.

=== Podcasts ===
On February 6, 2022, Dr. Jay de Soca Prince launched Soca Therapy as an online podcast available on Apple Podcast. On August 2, 2023, he partnered with Spotify to curate a "Carnival Sounds" playlist for the Toronto Caribbean Carnival.

== Awards and nominations ==
Year	Award	Category	Result
1998	Toronto DJ of the Year		Won
1999	Toronto DJ of the Year		Won
2001	Canadian Urban Music Awards	Best Radio/Media Personality	Nominated
2002	Canadian Urban Music Awards	Best Radio/Media Personality	Won
2003	Canadian Urban Music Awards	Best Radio/Media Personality	Nominated
2004	Canadian Urban Music Awards	Best Radio/Media Personality	Nominated
2005	Soca Awards Organization	International Soca DJ of the Year	Won
2006	Soca Awards Organization	International Soca DJ of the Year	Won
	DJ Stylus Awards	Soca DJ of the Year	Won
2007	DJ Stylus Awards	Soca DJ of the Year	Won
2008	DJ Stylus Awards	Soca DJ of the Year	Won
2009	DJ Stylus Awards	Soca DJ of the Year	Won
