= Rum and Coca-Cola =

1944 song by Morey Amsterdam and R. Grant a/k/a Invader

Single by Andrews Sisters
- B-side: "One Meat Ball"
- Published: December 11, 1944 by Leo Feist, Inc., New York
- Released: December 1944
- Recorded: October 18, 1944
- Studio: Decca Studios, New York City
- Genre: Popular music; calypso; rhumba
- Length: 3:08
- Label: Decca 18636
- Composers: Lionel Belasco (credited to Jeri Sullivan & Paul Baron)
- Lyricist: Lord Invader (credited to Morey Amsterdam)

"Rum and Coca-Cola" is a popular calypso song composed by Lionel Belasco with lyrics by Lord Invader. The song was copyrighted in the United States by entertainer Morey Amsterdam and was a hit in 1945 for the Andrews Sisters.

== History ==
"Rum and Coca-Cola" (1945)
Sample of the 1945 cover "Rum and Coca-Cola" by The Andrews Sisters.

The melody was published as the work of Venezuelan calypso composer Lionel Belasco on a song titled "L'Année Passée". The lyrics to "Rum and Coca-Cola" were written by Rupert Grant, another calypso musician from Trinidad who used the stage name Lord Invader.

The song became a local hit and was at the peak of its popularity when US entertainer Morey Amsterdam visited the island in September 1943 as part of a U.S.O. tour. The song was then published in the United States with Amsterdam listed as lyricist and Jeri Sullivan and Paul Baron as composers. Although he claimed never to have heard the song during the month he spent on the island, the lyrics to his version are clearly based on the Lord Invader version, with the music and chorus being virtually identical. However, Amsterdam's version strips the song of its social commentary. The Lord Invader version laments that U.S. soldiers are debauching local women who "saw that the Yankees treat them nice/and they give them a better price." Its final stanza describes a newlywed couple whose marriage is ruined when "the bride run away with a soldier lad/and the stupid husband went staring mad." The Amsterdam version also hints that women are prostituting themselves, preserved in the Lord Invader chorus which says, "Both mother and daughter/Working for the Yankee dollar."

Since the Yankee come to Trinidad
They got the young girls all goin' mad
Young girls say they treat 'em nice
Make Trinidad like paradise

The song was recorded in 1944 by The Andrews Sisters, crediting the composition to Amsterdam, Sullivan and Baron. The sisters seem to have given little thought to the meaning of the lyrics. According to Patty Andrews, "We had a recording date, and the song was brought to us the night before the recording date. We hardly really knew it, and when we went in we had some extra time and we just threw it in, and that was the miracle of it. It was actually a faked arrangement. There was no written background, so we just kind of faked it." In under ten minutes they made a record that sold seven million units and sat at number one on the Billboard magazine chart for seven weeks. Maxine Andrews recalled, "The rhythm was what attracted the Andrews Sisters to 'Rum and Coca-Cola'. We never thought of the lyric. The lyric was there, it was cute, but we didn't think of what it meant; but at that time, nobody else would think of it either, because we weren't as morally open as we are today and so, a lot of stuff—really, no excuses—just went over our heads." Some stations refused to play the song because it mentioned rum, and alcohol could not be advertised on the air, or because it mentioned the brand name Coca-Cola, which was perceived as advertising for the soft drink.

In the Songs That Won The War Vol. 8 Swing Again, Yes Indeed! CD program notes, Edward Habib writes, "'Rum and Coca Cola' has naughty lyrics but not quite naughty enough to deny its hit status...During the forties, comedians as songwriters was the norm, Phil Silvers, Joey Bishop and Jackie Gleason all had a part in writing hit songs. While there were a number of records of 'Rum and Coca Cola', the Andrews Sisters' version was far and away the most popular." Other artists who released versions included American singer-songwriter Harry Belafonte.

After the release of the Andrews Sisters recording, Belasco and Lord Invader sued for copyright infringement of the song's music and lyrics, respectively. In 1948, after years of litigation, both plaintiffs won their cases, with Lord Invader receiving an award of $150,000 in owed royalties. However, Morey Amsterdam was allowed to retain copyright to the song. Lord Invader also wrote a follow-up song to "Rum and Coca-Cola", titled "Yankee Dollar".

== Chart performance ==
"Rum and Coca-Cola" spent ten weeks at the top of the Billboard Pop Singles chart. On the Harlem Hit Parade chart, it went to number three.
