= Jamesy P =

Vincentian musician (born 1970)

Jamesy P (born James Morgan, 18 May 1970) is a Vincentian musician (and former barber) who released a soca single in 2002 titled "Nookie". Its 2005 release was a hit, reaching No. 14 on the UK Singles Chart, as well as becoming the biggest song in the Caribbean 2005 to 2006, and hitting Billboard's urban charts in the United States and Canada.

== Discography ==
=== Singles ===
Title	Year	Chart positions		
Title	Year	AUS	UK	US R&B/HH
"Nookie" (featuring Jabba and M.I.A.)	2005	86	14	54
