= Nookie (Jamesy P song) =

Single by Jamesy P

from the album Work of Art
- Released: 2002 / 2005
- Recorded: 2002
- Genre: Soca
- Length: 3:25 (radio edit); 5:31 (extended mix)
- Label: Smoove Records, Universal
- Songwriter(s): James Morgan, Mark Cyrus
- Producer(s): Mark Cyrus

"Nookie" is a song by Vincentian musician Jamesy P. The song was first released in 2002 on 7" vinyl on the VP Records sublabel Waist Line Muzik. Its 2005 release was a top 20 hit in the UK, peaking at number 14 on the UK Singles Chart. It also peaked at number 54 on the Billboard Hot R&B/Hip-Hop Songs chart. The remix version features British rapper M.I.A. and Jabba. Another version features Chrissy Mai.

== Charts ==
Chart performance for "Nookie"
Chart (2005)	Peak position
Australia (ARIA)	86
UK Singles (OCC)	14
US Billboard Hot R&B/Hip-Hop Songs	54
