= Mighty Dougla =

Trinidadian calypsonian

- Born: Cletus Ali; Port of Spain, Trinidad and Tobago
- Genres: Calypso

Cletus Ali, better known as Mighty Dougla, was a Trinidadian calypsonian who won the island's Calypso King title in 1961.

== Career ==
From the Hell Yard area of Port of Spain, Ali was a popular calypsonian in the late 1950s and early 1960s. He was born a Dougla, to Indo-Trinidadian father and an Afro-Trinidadian mother.

Dougla is a usually pejorative term used in the Caribbean for someone of mixed (African and Indian) descent. Dougla is not always a pejorative term. In Trinidad, for example, Dougla is a neutral, or even positive term. The term changes its meaning depending upon the culture of the country. In Guyana, where are there has been a significant racial conflict, Douglas are viewed negatively. In Trinidad, by contrast, the racial conflict has been mostly wrought through the ballots, rather than through violence in the streets. Douglas in Trinidad are viewed as a preferred group.

In addition to adopting this as his stage name, he referred to this in one of his best known calypsos, "Split Me In Two", dealing with the Dougla's position in the Black/Indian political division on the island and proposed repatriation ("I am neither one nor the other, six of one, half a dozen of the other, If they serious about sending people back for true, They got to split me in two"). This was one of the songs (along with "Lazy Man") that won him the Calypso King title at the 1961 carnival. He finished in third place in 1963, behind Mighty Sparrow and Lord Kitchener.

Another of his calypsos, "Man Nicer Than Woman" was a humorous tale of an argument between a gay man and his straight friend.

He performed for six days at the 1963 Virgin Islands carnival as part of a Trinidadian package along with Mighty Sparrow and Lord Cristo.

Mighty Dougla died in the late 1970s.
