= The Mighty Duke =

Mighty Duke
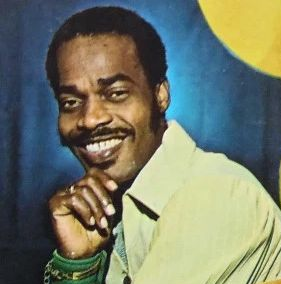
- The Mighty Duke on the cover of Cock Of The Rock

Background information
- Born: Kelvin Pope; 1932; Point Fortin, Trinidad and Tobago
- Died: 14 January 2009 (aged 76) Port-of-Spain, Trinidad and Tobago
- Genres: Calypso
- Years active: 1950s–2009

Kelvin Pope, better known as The Mighty Duke (1932 – 14 January 2009) was a Trinidadian calypsonian. He was born in Point Fortin.

== Career ==
Born in Point Fortin in 1932, Pope was a former school teacher who left a career working at Shell Oil to perform calypso music. In the 1950s, he played locally in his hometown, then began playing in San Fernando at the Southern Brigade Calypso Tent. In 1964 he relocated to Port of Spain and performed at the Original Young Brigade.

He won the National Calypso King title for four years straight (1968–71), the only person to achieve the feat: In 1968 with "What Is Calypso" and "Social Bacchanal", in 1969 with "Black Is Beautiful" and "One Foot Visina", then in 1970 singing "Brotherhood of Man" and "See Through" and finally, in 1971 he won the competition performing "Mathematical Formula" and "Melvine & Yvonne". Furthermore he was noted for exploring ideas such as black consciousness, apartheid, and global politics in his lyrics. Lord Nelson was one of many for whom he composed music.

In 1970, he was awarded the Silver Hummingbird Medal for his contribution to calypso.

In 1987, his soca song "Thunder" was awarded the Road March prize.

Pope died on 14 January 2009, aged 76, in St. Clair (Port-of-Spain), Trinidad and Tobago of myelofibrosis, which he had been battling for five years.

== Discography ==
=== Singles ===
- "Woop Wap"/"Racial Segregation" (National Record Company 031) (Single) (1964) featuring the Bert Inniss National Recording Orchestra
- "Grenada Girl"/"Crime Wave" (Telco US) (Single) (1968)
- "Black Is Beautiful"/"Visina" (Tropico T-71098) (Single) (1969)
- "Macajuel Oil"/"Blackskin Whiteman" (Tropico T-7-1128) (Single) (196?)
- "Black Power"/"Mathematical Formula For Peace" (1971)
- "Steelband Panorama"/"Trouble in '72" (1972)
- "V Is For Peace"/"Child Of The Ghetto" (Camille Records C138) (Single) (1974)
- Cock of the Rock (Camille Records 9038) (12") (1975)
- "Ah Wish I Was"/"Swing With King" (Camille Records C152) (Single) (1975)
- "Poo Po Doo"/"Axe Handle Freda" (Camille Records C155) (Single) (1975)
- "Teach The Children"/"Don't Waist Yuh Waist" (Camille Records C161) (Single) (1976)
- "My Night To Party"/"Mr. Jarvis" (1977)
- "Carnival Fire"/"Uhuru" (Charlie's Records CR 535) (Single) (1977)
- "Do What You Doing"/"Bam Bam Oui" (Charlie's Records DDCR 239) (Single) (1979)
- "Ah Like It"/"Bam Bam Oye" (Romey's RS 015) (Single) (1979)
- "The Imitators"/"If" (197?)
- "Work It Up"/"Doh Horn Meh" (Duke Record D 01) (12") (1980)
- "Is Thunder"/"Love Vibrations" (Hot Vinyl HVT 43) (12") (1987)

=== Albums ===
- All Night Tonight (MCA Records 1890) (1969)
- A Message From The Man (Camille Records C 09027) (1973)
- Poetry & Music (Charlie's Records CR-136) (1977)
- Harps Of Gold (Sharc International SS-1079-1) (1980)
- Over And Over And Over Again (B's Records B'sR1009) (1982)
- Carnival Anniversary (Straker's Records GS 2245) (1983)
- Calypso Forever (Straker's Records GS 2253) (1984)
- Land Of Love (Straker's Records GS 2262) (1985)
- In These Times (Straker's Records GS 2266) (1986)
- Yesterday Today Tomorrow (Lem's Records LEM-DKE-0101) (1987)
- Poison (JW Productions JW-DKE-002) (1988)
- Party For Yuh Life! (JW Productions JW-DKE-018) (1989)
- Total Dis-Order (JW Productions JW-DKE-028) (1990)
- Hotel Time (Charlie's Records DCR 3559A) (1991)
- The Phung-Uh-Nung Sweet (Straker's Records GS 2355-B) (1992)
- Ah Duke Ah King Ah Pope (Spice Island Records SILP-0020) (1993)
- Mask (Ice Records 931401) (1994)
