= Singing Sandra =

Trinidadian calypsonian (1957–2021)

- Born: Sandra Des Vignes; 10 December 1957; East Dry River, Trinidad
- Died: 28 January 2021 (aged 63)
- Genres: Calypso
- Years active: 1980s–2021

Singing Sandra (Sandra Des Vignes-Millington) (December 10, 1957 – January 28, 2021) was a Trinidadian calypsonian known for her vocal performances. She won both the National Calypso Queen and Calypso Monarch competitions, most well known in the Soca music scene.

== Personal life ==
Sandra Des Vignes-Millington was born on December 10, 1957, in the East Dry River, Port of Spain, Trinidad. She was raised in Morvant, Trinidad and Tobago and grew up as an only child with her mother. She never met her father. At fifteen, Sandra was baptized into a Spiritual Baptist church faith and later began practicing Orisha.

From an early age, she sang and acted in small productions. Due to behavioral issues and poor attendance, Sandra did not complete her formal education and worked at various low-wage jobs in her twenties.

== Career ==
In 1984, Sandra was approached by calypsonian Dr. Zhivago to perform two of his songs. The following year, she joined the Mighty Sparrow's Youth Brigade tent during carnival. There, in 1987, she earned the titles of National Calypso Queen and St Maarten Queen of the World with the song 'Sexy Employees,' more commonly known as 'Die With My Dignity.' The song reflected a moral stance against male chauvinism in the workplace.

She won the Carifesta Monarch and 'Calypso Queen of the World' titles in 1992, and performed at the 1992 Reggae Sunsplash festival.

Later, Sandra formed the United Sisters group with Lady B, Tigress, and Marvelous Marva. She continued to perform as a solo artist, and at the 1997 carnival she won the 'Best Nation Building Song' award along with a prize for the song 'One Destiny One Heart'.

In 1999, Sandra became the second woman to win the Calypso Monarch competition (after Calypso Rose in 1978) at Trinidad and Tobago's Carnival. Two of her songs, 'Song for Healing' and 'Voices from the Ghetto', addressed the struggles of marginalized communities. She secured third place in 2000 and fifth place in 2001.

In 2003, she won the title for the second time, becoming the first woman to achieve two Calypso Monarch victories. The two songs she performed for the competition ('For Whom the Bell Tolls' and 'Ancient Rhythm') contained strong political content. The latter song talks about the experiences of the African diaspora community in Trinidad and elsewhere, and finding freedom within music by embracing diaspora identity.

== Legacy ==
Through her music, which addressed social, racial, and feminist themes, in a notably male-dominated genre, Singing Sandra became a prominent female figure in the Calypso industry.
