= Lord Invader =

Trinidadian calypsonian (1914–1961)

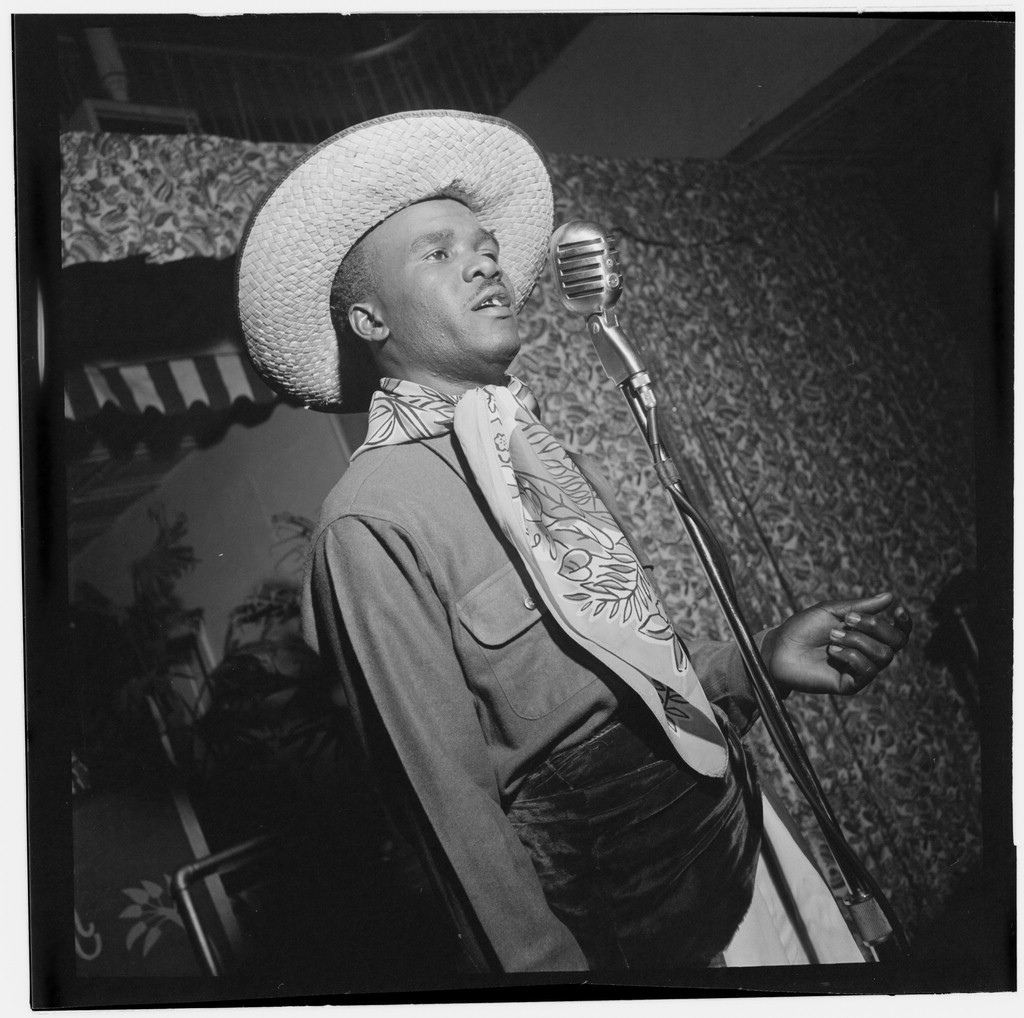
Performing in the 1940s

Lord Invader (Rupert Westmore Grant; 13 December 1914 – 15 October 1961) was a prominent calypsonian with a very distinctive, gravelly voice.

He was born in San Fernando, Trinidad. He became active in calypso in the mid-1930s, and was considered a country bumpkin by his contemporaries, because of his humble beginning. It was Grant's tailor who gave him his moniker by commenting, "I tell you, Rupert, you should call yourself Lord Invader so when you go up to the city you be invadin' the capital." With a new name, in 1937 he went to the capital city of Port of Spain and began his career in earnest.

He competed in many calypso competitions (including the very first Calypso King competition) and recorded for RCA Bluebird. Lured by Decca Records, he travelled to New York City in 1941 with other calypsonians such as Roaring Lion and Atilla the Hun to make records and promote calypso music. He wrote many calypsos; his most famous lyrics, "Rum and Coca-Cola", were plagiarised by Morey Amsterdam and became a hit for the Andrews Sisters. Invader travelled to New York and sued, eventually winning compensation, although the final settlement allowed Amsterdam to retain his copyright. In the early 1940s, radio stations in the USA refused to play his own version on the grounds of its using the trademarked name, Coca-Cola, and its references to prostitution and alcohol. He stayed in New York for a few years because of the lengthy court case. During his tenure in New York City, he became a fixture in the local calypso scene and recorded many tracks for Moses Asch. Eventually, he won his court case, but did not receive his settlement check for seven years, so he returned to Trinidad in the meantime. He opened a calypso club there and penned and recorded many original songs.

He is often credited with writing "Zombie Jamboree", although the song was actually written by Lord Intruder (Winston O'Conner), who released it on the B-side of his 1953 single "Disaster with Police". It was covered by Conrad Eugene Mauge Jr, who recorded it in 1959 and was also often credited for writing it. The confusion probably stems from the introduction of the version by the Kingston Trio, which mentions "Lord Invader and his Twelve Penetrators". At long last, Invader collected his money from his court case, and began to tour the U.S., later expanding to Britain and Europe. In the last half of 1958, he returned to New York City and continued recording for Moses Asch. He continued to return to his homeland for business and pleasure, although he had, with Wilmoth Houdini, made himself one of America's most successful calypsonians. On 15 October 1961, Lord Invader died at a Brooklyn, New York hospital.

The following discs give a good idea of his work:

- Calypso in New York (Smithsonian Folkways 40454), released in 2000, is a collection of Invader's recordings across his whole career.
- Calypso at Midnight and Calypso After Midnight come from a live recording organized by Alan Lomax in New York in 1946.
- Calypso War, Kings of Calypso, and Trojan Calypso boxed set all feature the same set of songs recorded in the United Kingdom in the 1950s.
- Folkways Records also have a number of CDs that Invader recorded in the late 1950s in New York, including, Calypso (1955), Calypso Travels, and There's a Brown Boy in the Ring and Other Children's Calypso Songs (1959).

In 1961, Invader released an atypical LP, West Indian Folk Songs for Children (Caedmon Records).

== See also ==
- Mighty Sparrow
- Lord Kitchener
