= Lord Melody =

Trinidadian calypsonian (1926–1988)

Background information
- Born: Fitzroy Alexander; 1926; San Fernando, Trinidad and Tobago
- Died: 26 September 1988 (aged 62) Trinidad
- Occupation: Calypsonian
- Years active: Early 1940s–mid-1980s
- Label: Cook

Lord Melody (1926 – 26 September 1988) was a Trinidadian calypsonian, best known for singles such as "Boo Boo Man", "Creature From The Black Lagoon", "Shame & Scandal", "Jonah and the Bake", "Juanita", and "Rastaman Be Careful". Melody's career spanned forty years, from the beginnings of popular calypso music to his embrace of the more dance oriented Soca style by the late 1970s.

== Career ==
Melody was born Fitzroy Alexander at San Fernando, Trinidad and Tobago, raised at an orphanage in Port of Spain, and met Alwyn Roberts (soon to become better known as Lord Kitchener) after moving to Arima while still in his teens. Roberts took him under his wing and they returned to Port of Spain, where Lord Kitchener became the leading calypso star, with Melody one of his main challengers. His popularity increased locally when Lord Kitchener emigrated to England in 1947. Melody's career started in the 1940s with performances in calypso tents, and he continued to perform in this and other venues in the Caribbean until the 1960s. His early successes included "Berlin on a Donkey", mocking Adolf Hitler, and "Boo Boo Man" first recorded in 1955 and released on several record labels. His rendition of "Second Spring" won him the Calypso Monarch title in 1954 and he signed with Cook Records in 1956.

He was one of the six vocalists chosen to perform for Princess Margaret when she visited Trinidad in 1956.

His first known album was Calypso Fiesta - Limbo In Trinidad, which was released in 1956 on Vitadisc records and contained eight songs, including his popular "Mama Look A Boo Boo". Another album, Calypso Carnival 1958, was released on Balisier records in 1958. It was a split release - the first side contained six Lord Melody songs (some of which did not appear elsewhere), and the second side comprised instrumental tracks by Cyril Diaz (whose band usually backed Melody on his recordings).

Cook Records released several live tracks featuring him on their albums Jump Up Carnival and Calypso Kings And Pink Gin in 1957, which led to him recording a full album for the label the next year.

His first album on Cook Records, Lord Melody Sings Calypso, was released in 1958, with a second album, Again! released the following year.

The rivalry between Melody and Mighty Sparrow was a feature of the calypsos "Ten to One is Murder" and "Cowboy Sparrow". Melody's third album, Calypso Through The Looking Glass, was released in 1960 and featured the infamous "Belmont Jackass", in which Melody berates Sparrow's wife. Melody's song "Wau, Wau" (more commonly known as "Shame and Scandal") was popular in 1962. The song was a version of a song originally recorded by Sir Lancelot in 1943 with new verses written by Melody. This subsequently became the most widely known version of the song and Melody's version was covered by The Wailers with Peter Tosh on lead vocal.

Harry Belafonte recorded Lord Melody's compositions "Boo Boo Man" (retitled "Mama Look at Bubu" and "Mama Look at Boo Boo") and "Sweetheart from Venezuela" (aka "Juanita"), having a top 20 hit in the US with the former in 1957. "Mama Look a Boo Boo" was also recorded by Robert Mitchum and others. Several singles became favourites with Britain's West Indian community in the late 1950s. In the first half of the 1960s, his popularity waned, but he again found success in 1965 when his "Melody Mas" won the Panorama at the Carnival. He released three albums in 1962, but despite recording a number of singles and compilation exclusives over the rest of the 1960s, did not record another album until 1974's Salt And Pepper.

Melody moved to New York he toured with Belafonte in the 1960s. He was diagnosed with cancer in the early 1970s and the illness restricted his career, although he continued to release albums throughout the 1970s. In this decade he gradually moved away from calypso and instead embraced the emerging soca and reggae styles. These recordings are distinguished by the synths and drum machines of the era and a more reverb-based production sound, as well as the aging quality of Melody's voice at the time. Around 1979 he became a Rastafarian, and released the I Man album, a reggae-tinged album on which he spoke on the subject, the singles "Brown Sugar" and "Rastaman Be Careful" becoming local hits in the same era. In 1982 he made another album, the soca-styled Lola.

Melody's health continued to deteriorate, and he died from cancer in September 1988, in Port of Spain.

== Discography ==
=== Albums ===
Year of release	Album title	Label
1956	"Calypso Fiesta - Limbo In Trinidad"	Vitadisc
1958	Lord Melody Sings Calypso	Cook
1959	Again! Lord Melody Sings Calypso	Cook
1960	Calypso Through the Looking Glass	Cook
1962	Lord Melody 1962	Cook
1962	Caribbean Limbo Music	Cook
1962	The Mighty Lord Melody	RCA
1962	Lord Melody Sings Calypsoes	RCA
1971	Grine Am	Straker's Records
1974	Salt 'N Pepper	Straker's Records
1976	Mas Is Devil Power	Strakers Records
1978	I Man	Eddymel Records
1979	Sugar Jam	Eddymel Records
1982	Lola	Bs

=== Compilations ===
- Precious Melodies (1994) Ice. Contains most of the tracks from the two RCA albums The Mighty Lord Melody and "Lord Melody Sings Calypsoes" (in most cases, their only appearance on CD). Also includes several previously unreleased songs from the 1950s and early 1960s.

=== Notable appearances on various artists compilations ===
- Jump Up Carnival (1956) Cook
- Calypso Kings and Pink Gin (1957) Cook
- Calypso Carnival 1958 (1958) Balisier
- Calypso Exposed (1961) Cook
- Top Calypsonians (1963) RCA
- Trinidad All Time Calypso Hits 1967-1968 (1968) Telco
- Sing Along With Melo (1970) Benroy's Records
- Super Calypso Hits (1973) Camille
- Calypso Cavalcade Vol 1 (1974) Sounds Of The Caribbean
- Calypso Cavalcade Vol 2 (1974) Sounds Of The Caribbean
- Calypso Cavalcade Vol 3 (1974) Sounds Of The Caribbean
- Calypso Awakening from the Emory Cook Collection (2000) Smithsonian Folkways
- Al Seales Forever GEMS Vol 1 (20??) Caribbean Gems
- Al Seales Forever GEMS Vol 2 (20??) Caribbean Gems
