= Sugar Aloes =

Trindiadian musician

Sugar Aloes (born Michael Anthony Osouna) is a calypsonian from Trinidad and Tobago whose songs include "Party Time" and "Juanita", "I Love Being Me" and "Signs of the end of Time". In February 2008, Sugar Aloes was the winner of the Calypso Monarch 2008 Competition at Queens Park Oval in Port-of-Spain, Trinidad. He won this competition singing a song entitled "Reflections". In this song, he made some sarcastic remarks about government, which maintained a certain degree of humor.
