= Black Stalin =

Trinidadian and Tobagonian singer (1941–2022)

- Born: Leroy Calliste; 24 September 1941; San Fernando, Trinidad and Tobago
- Died: 28 December 2022 (aged 81) San Fernando, Trinidad and Tobago
- Genres: Calypso
- Occupations: Singer, Songwriter, Griot
- Years active: 1959–2022

Leroy Calliste (24 September 1941 – 28 December 2022), better known as Black Stalin, was a leading calypsonian from Trinidad and Tobago known for his lyrics against European colonial oppression. He won the Calypso Monarch competition on five occasions and the Calypso King of the World title in 1999.

== Biography/Life story ==
Born and raised on Coffee Street in San Fernando to George and Elcina Calliste, he is one of four children. He attended San Fernando Boys' R.C. School. He worked as a limbo dancer before taking up singing calypso in 1959 when he made his debut at the Good Shepherd Hall in St. Madeleine, but did not join a calypso tent until 1962 when he joined the Southern Brigade. He was given the nickname "Black Stalin" by fellow calypsonian Blakie in the mid-1960s. In 1967 Black Stalin joined Kitchener's Calypso Revue tent and managed to place in that year's Calypso Monarch competition.

Stalin won the Calypso Monarch competition for the first time in 1979 (with "Caribbean Man" and "Play One") and went on to win it again in 1985, 1987, 1991 and 1995.

In 1979 he moved over to the Mighty Shadow's King of the Wizards Tent and recorded his first album, To the Caribbean Man. That year he walked away with his first Calypso Monarch crown for his two compositions, "Caribbean Unity" and "Play One".

In 1985 he won the crown again with "Ism Schism" and "Wait Dorothy", and again in 1987 with a tribute to steelband entitled "Mr. Panmaker" and "Bun 'Dem", a song calling for St. Peter to cast the likes of Christopher Columbus, Cecil Rhodes, Margaret Thatcher and Ronald Reagan into Hell.

In 1987 he was also awarded the Hummingbird Medal (Silver) for his contribution to Trinidad and Tobago culture.

In 1991 the usually dread and critical Stalin took a winning turn and walked away with the Calypso Monarch crown again, with "Look on the Bright Side" and "Black man Feelin' to Party". In 1995 he went chutney, with a "Tribute to Sundar Popo", in honour of his old friend and fellow singer.

In 1994 he signed with Eddy Grant's Ice Records label, releasing the Rebellion album that year and Message to Sundar in 1995.

After finishing as runner-up to Mighty Sparrow in 1985, in 1999 Black Stalin won the title of Calypso King of the World with the calypsoes "Ah Feel to Party" and "Wine Boy", poking fun at the politician Dhanraj Singh.

Black Stalin became Dr. Leroy Calliste on 31 October 2008, when he was conferred with an honorary doctorate from the University of the West Indies, St. Augustine, for his tremendous dedication and contribution to Calypso music and culture in Trinidad and Tobago.

== Personal life and death ==
On 22 September 2014, he was hospitalised after suffering a stroke a few hours after performing at a charity show in south Trinidad. Relatives said that Stalin, 73, was rushed to the San Fernando Hospital after he started experiencing severe pain to his back on returning home from performing at the inclusive fundraiser hosted by the St. Andrew Anglican Church in aid of its building fund.

Black Stalin died on 28 December 2022, at the age of 81.

== Discography ==
=== Albums ===
- To the Caribbean Man (1979), Makossa International
- This is It (1980), Makossa International
- In Ah Earlier Time (1981), Makossa International
- You Ask For It (1984), Charlie's
- Wait Dorothy Wait (1985), Charlie's
- I Time (1986), B's
- We Can Make It (1988)
- To De Master (1989), WB
- The Bright Side (1991), Straker's
- Cry of the Caribbean (1992), Straker's
- Help (1993), Straker's
- Rebellion (1994), Ice
- Message to Sundar (1995), Ice
- Just For You (2009), Charlie's/VP

Live

- Live! Collector's Edition (2009), JW

Compilations

- Roots Rock Soca (1991), Rounder
- Best of Black Stalin (1997), Musicrama

=== Singles, EPs ===
- "Man Is Man" (1977), Semp
- Nah Ease Up EP (1990), Carotte
