= Calypso Monarch =

Annual calypso competition in Trinidad

The Calypso Monarch (originally Calypso King) contest is one of the two major annual calypso competitions held in Trinidad and all English speaking Caribbean islands, as part of the annual carnival celebrations.

== History ==
While Trinidad's carnival has its origins in the 18th century, a singing contest was first held in 1911, when the Jubilee Establishment offered a prize for "the most original song on a local topic". Further competitions were held after World War I, and the Calypso King contest was first held in 1939. The first winner was Growling Tiger with "Trade Union", followed by Roaring Lion in 1940 and Mighty Destroyer in 1941. After a break during World War II, it resumed in 1946, with Atilla the Hun winning the first of two consecutive titles. Mighty Spoiler won the first of three titles in 1948, and Lord Melody the first of three the following year. The competition's most successful calypsonians, Mighty Sparrow and Chalkdust, have won the title eight and nine times respectively, the first in 1956, and the last in 1992 for Sparrow, and Chalkdust's reigns were between 1976 and 2017.

While calypso had been traditionally a male preserve, the contest was won in 1978 by Calypso Rose, prompting the organisers to crown her 'Calypso Monarch', the gender-neutral title remaining from that day. There was not another female winner until Singing Sandra took the crown in 1999. Singing Sandra and Terri Lyons are the only female calypsonians to win the Calypso Monarch twice.

The late Mighty Duke is the only calypsonian to have won the title on four consecutive occasions between 1968 and 1971. Duane O'Connor and Duane Ta'zyah O'Connor are the only parent and child to win the Calypso Monarch title. Duane (the father) won in 2012 and his son (Duane Ta'zyah) won in 2023.

Rastafari calypsonian Black Stalin won the title on five occasions between 1979 and 1995.

The contest is limited to Trinidad & Tobago nationals; however, similar Calypso Monarch contests are now held annually in other Caribbean countries and also in North America and the United Kingdom.

== Winners ==
Year	Winner	Winning song(s)	Title #
1939	Growling Tiger	"Trade Union"	1
1940	Roaring Lion	"Rise and Fall of the British Empire"	1
1941	Mighty Destroyer	"Adolf Hitler"	1
1946	Atilla the Hun	"Daily Mail Report"	1st
1947	Atilla the Hun	"Million Dollar Jail"	2nd
1948	Mighty Spoiler	"Royal Wedding"	1st
1949	Lord Melody	"Glory Mama Glory"	1st
1950		No competition held	
1951	Lord Melody	"Jonah and the Bake"	2nd
1953	Mighty Spoiler	"Bed Bug"	2nd
1954	Lord Melody	"Second Spring"	3rd
1955	Mighty Spoiler	"Pick Sense Out of Nonsense"	3rd
1956	Mighty Sparrow	"Yankees Gone"	1st
1957	Lord Pretender	"Que Sera Sera"	1
1958	Striker	"Don't Blame the PNM", "Can't Find a Job to Suit Me"	1st
1959	Striker	"Ban the Hoola Hoop", "Comparison"	2nd
1960	Mighty Sparrow	"Mae Mae", "Ten to One Is Murder"	2nd
1961	Mighty Dougla	"Lazy Man", "Split Me in Two"	1
1962	Mighty Sparrow	"Federation", "Sparrow Come Back Home"	3rd
1963	Mighty Sparrow	"Dan Is the Man in the Van", "Kennedy"	4th
1964	Mighty Bomber	"Joan and James", "Bomber's Dream"	1
1965	Sniper	"Portrait of Trinidad", "More Production"	1
1966	Mighty Terror	"Pan Jamboree", "Last Year's Happiness"	1
1967	Mighty Cypher	"Last Elections", "If the Priest Could Play"	1
1968	Mighty Duke	"What Is Calypso", "Social Bacchanal"	1st
1969	Mighty Duke	"One Foot Visina", "Black Is Beautiful"	2nd
1970	Mighty Duke	"Brotherhood of Man", "See Through"	3rd
1971	Mighty Duke	"Mathematical Formula", "Melvin & Yvonne"	4th
1972	Mighty Sparrow	"Drunk and Disorderly"	5th
1973	Mighty Sparrow	"School Days", "Same Time, Same Place"	6th
1974	Mighty Sparrow	"We Pass That Stage", "Miss Mary"	7th
1975	Lord Kitchener	"Tribute to Spree Simon", "Fever"	1
1976	Chalkdust	"No Smut For Me", "Ah Put On Meh Guns Again"	1st
1977	Chalkdust	"My Way Of Protest", "Shango Vision"	2nd
1978	Calypso Rose	"I Thank Thee", "Her Majesty"	1
1979	Black Stalin	"Caribbean Man (Caribbean Unity)", "Play One"	1st
1980	Lord Relator	"Food Prices", "Take ah Rest Mr Prime Minister"	1
1981	Chalkdust	"Things That Worry Me", "I Can't Make"	3rd
1982	Scrunter	"The Will", "Ah Lick E Thing"	1
1983	Tobago Crusoe	"Don't Cry Now", "South Africa"	1
1984	Penguin	"We Living in Jail", "Sorf Man"	1
1985	Black Stalin	"Ism Schism", "Wait Dorothy Wait"	2nd
1986	David Rudder	"The Hammer", "Bahia Girl"	1
1987	Black Stalin	"Mr Pan Maker", "Burn Them"	3rd
1988	Cro-Cro	"Three Bo-rats", "Corruption in Common Entrance"	1st
1989	Chalkdust	"Chauffeur Wanted", "Carnival Is the Answer"	4th
1990	Cro-Cro	"Political Dictionary", "Party"	2nd
1991	Black Stalin	"Ah Feel to Party", "Look on the Bright Side"	4th
1992	Mighty Sparrow	"Both of Them", "Survival"	8th
1993	Chalkdust	"Misconception", "Kaiso in the Hospital"	5th
1994=	De Lamo	"31 Years Old", "Trinity Is My Name"	1
1994=	Luta	"Good Driving", "Licensed Firearm"	1st
1995	Black Stalin	"In Time", "Tribute to Sundar Popo"	5th
1996	Cro-Cro	"All Yuh Look for Dat", "Deh Cyah Stop Social Commentary"	3rd
1997	Gypsy	"Rhythm of a People", "Little Black Boy"	1
1998	Mystic Prowler	"Vision of T&T in the Year 2010", "Look Beneath the Surface"	1
1999	Singing Sandra	"Voices from the Ghetto", "Song for Healing"	1st
2000	Shadow	"What's Wrong with Me", "Scratch meh Back"	1
2001	Denyse Plummer	"Heroes", "Nah Leaving"	1
2002	Sugar Aloes	"Contribution", "Jubilation"	1st
2003	Singing Sandra	"For Whom the Bell Tolls", "Ancient Rhythm"	2nd
2004	Chalkdust	"Trinidad in the Cemetery", "Fish Mongrel"	6th
2005	Chalkdust	"A When I Vexed, I doh Rhyme", "In Town Too Long"	7th
2006	Luta	"Check The Foundation", "Kaiso Kaiso"	2nd
2007	Cro-Cro	"Nobody Ain't Go Know"	4th
2008	Sugar Aloes	"Reflections"	2nd
2009	Chalkdust	"My Heart and I"	8th
2010	Kurt Allen	"Too Bright"	1
2011	Karene Asche	"Careful What You Ask For", "Uncle Jack"	1
2012	Duane O'Connor	"The Hunt Is On", "Long Live Calypso"	1
2013	Eric "Pink Panther" Taylor	"Travel Woe", "Crying in the Chapel"	1
2014	Roderick "Chucky" Gordon	"Wey You Think", "Wedding of de Century"	1st
2015	Roderick "Chucky" Gordon	"The Rose", "I Believe"	2nd
2016	Devon Seale	“Respect God's Voice”, "Spirit of Carnival"	1
2017	Chalkdust	"75 can't go into 14"	9th
2018	Helon Francis	"Change"	1st
2019	Ronaldo London	“Imagination”	1
2020	Terri Lyons	"Obeah", "Meghan My Dear"	1
2023	Duane Ta'zyah O'Connor	"Sing Hallelujah"	1
2024	Machel Montano	"Soul of Calypso"	1
2025	Helon Francis	"To Whom it May Be"	2nd
2026	Terri Lyons	"Blessings"	2nd

|

== Multiple titles ==
Only a few Calypsonians have the honour of being crowned multiple-time monarchs.

Winner	Years	# of titles
Atilla the Hun	1946-1947	2
Mighty Spoiler	1948, 1953, 1955	3
Lord Melody	1949, 1950, 1954	3
Mighty Sparrow	1956, 1960, 1962–1963, 1972–1974, 1992	8
Striker	1958-1959	2
Mighty Duke	1968-1971	4
Chalkdust	1976–1977, 1981, 1989, 1993, 2004–2005, 2009, 2017	9
Black Stalin	1979, 1985, 1987, 1991, 1995	5
Cro-Cro	1988, 1990, 1996, 2007	4
Luta	1994 (Tie), 2006	2
Singing Sandra	1999, 2003	2
Sugar Aloes	2002, 2008	2
Roderick "Chucky" Gordon	2014, 2015	2
Helon Francis	2018, 2025	2
Terri Lyons	2020, 2026	2

== See also ==
- Harry Belafonte, US artist arguably best known for his interpretations of Calypso music
