= Mighty Spoiler =

Trinidadian calypsonian (1926–1960)

Theophilus Philip (23 March 1926 – 26 December 1960), better known as Mighty Spoiler, was a Trinidadian calypsonian.

Spoiler's career began in 1946 (see 1946 in music) at the House of Lords Tent, and he soon became one of the most popular calypso singers, known for hits such as "Bedbug", "Magistrate Try Himself", "Picking Sense From Nonsense", "Royal Wedding". He won the Calypso King title on three occasions, in 1948 (with "Royal Wedding"), 1953 ("Bed Bug"), and 1955 ("Picking Sense From Nonsense").

He died in 1960 of an alcohol-related illness.

== Legacy ==
Derek Walcott in his poem "The Spoiler's Return" borrows the calypsonian's persona, reworking his "Bedbug" calypso and making satirical use of Spoiler's trademark incantation: "Ah wanna fall!"

Among Spoiler's students was Grenadian-born calypsonian The Mighty Bomber (Clifton Ryan).
