= Calypsonian =

Singer of calypso

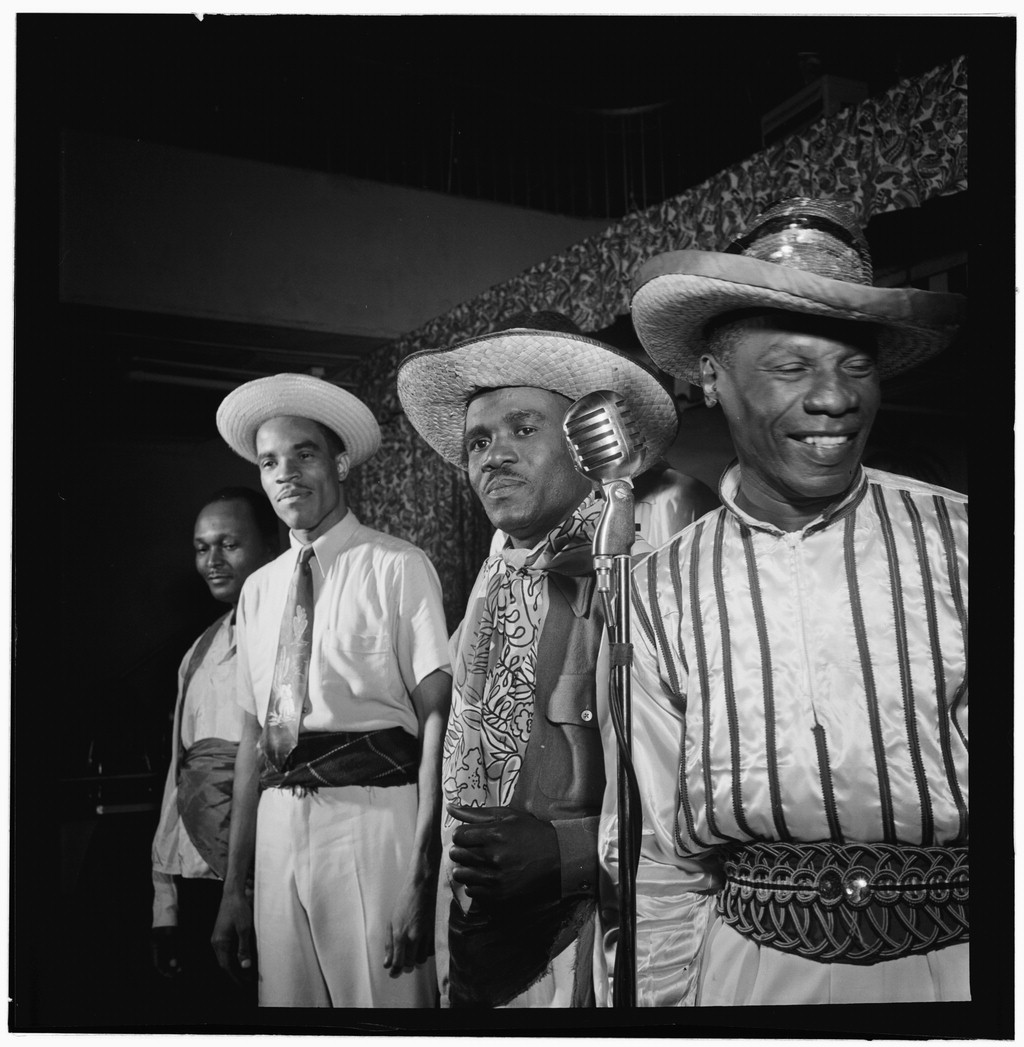
Calypsonians c. 1940s

A calypsonian, originally known as a chantwell, is a musician from the anglophone Caribbean who sings songs of the calypso genre.

Calypsos are musical renditions having their origins in the West African griot tradition. Originally called "Kaiso" in Trinidad, these songs, based on West African Yoruba, Ewe-Fon and Akan musical beats, were sung by slaves and later ex-slaves in Trinidad and Tobago during recreation time and about a host of topics – their land of origin, social relationships on the plantations and the lives of community members, including plantation managers, overseers and owners.

Traditionalists see calypso as social commentary because in earlier years it served the purpose of telling stories, relaying news events and giving criticisms of persons and policy. Calypso was therefore divided into two classes: the social commentaries, which had songs dealing with politics and community issues; and the humorous calypso, which told stories of events, real or imagined, with the intent of making the audience laugh.

By the late 19th century the British began large-scale immigration projects, mainly from Barbados, in an effort to anglicise Trinidad, which resulted in a decline in the use of French Creole in the songs so that by the 1930s English Creole became the language of Trinidad Calypso. Despite the changeover, many words and expressions survived in Trinidad Creole and as a result also survived in its calypsos, including terms such as "santimanitay" from the original sans humanité, among others.

Trinidad became the mecca of calypso in part because it was the most prosperous territory in the region and consequently many migrants headed to the island during the 20th century, including performers. As a direct result, Trinidad became known as the land of calypso.

Many early kaiso/calypsos were sung in French Creole, as Trinidad gained a significant number of free and enslaved blacks from the French Antilles of Martinique, Guadeloupe, French-dominated Grenada and Dominica following the Cedula of population of 1783. The patois or French creole was the original language of the calypsonian and calypso music.

== Origin ==
Calypso music was developed in Trinidad in the 17th century from the West African kaiso and canboulay music brought by African slaves imported to that Caribbean island to work on sugar plantations. They were stripped of all connections to their homeland and family and not allowed to talk to each other. African griots (musicians and storytellers) among the slaves used calypso song to mock the slave-masters and to communicate with each other. As calypso developed, the African griots became later-generation chantuelles or "chantwells" preserving their people's history and traditions orally, a role that would eventually develop into that of the modern calypsonian.

=== Chantwells ===
The Chantwells would sing of contemporary and mythical figures. They would also preserve the complex oral traditions of their West African origins, with songs of derision, praise, satire, and lament. At first, the chantwells were mostly women because the males were targeted for destruction on the plantation. Upon emancipation, the tradition continued and developed, and chantwells would sing call-and-response chants called lavways, sometimes lionizing and cheering on locals sportsmen such as stick-fighters, with the chantwell giving the call and the audience providing the response. This form of music gradually evolved into the modern calypso. As the country became urbanized, chantwells became more and more a male function.

=== Social commentary, extempo, competitions ===
Traditionalist see calypso as social commentary because in earlier years it served the purpose of telling stories, relaying news events and giving criticisms of persons and policy. Calypso was therefore divided into two classes: the social commentaries, which had songs dealing with politics and community issues; and the humorous calypso, which told stories of events, real or imagined, with the intent of making the audience laugh.

The latter form was supplemented by the extempo, which was a singing competition between two competitors. In classic extempo, competitors were pitted against one another, hurling insults in verse about each competitor's appearance, singing ability or personal situation.

Extempo competitions and the Calypso Monarch championship are held during Carnival time in Trinidad. The extempo competitions have developed so that competitors choose a topic from a container and are given a designated period of time to compose an agreed number of verses to be sung. A performer sings one verse and then his competitor is allowed to reply, either by responding to the verse sung or by singing about his competitor. Verses about competitors, which may range from insults about their attire to derogatory comments on physical attributes, form part of what Trinidadians term pekong, where someone is allowed to insult another for fun. In this respect, the form is similar to that of the rap battle.

The major difference between a calypsonian and a calypso singer is that a true calypsonian writes his/her own material, and sings topical music that reflects the reality of the community, an example being Attila the Hun, whereas a calypso singer will tend to sing standards, an example being Ritchie Delamore. Some calypsonians both compose and sing their calypsoes while many calypsonians in more recent decades have turned to professional composers, some being fellow calypsonians, for songs that they in turn sing.

== Sobriquets ==
Calypsonians traditionally use sobriquets linked with the ideas they wish to convey or referencing childhood or community-based "nick-names", including some such as the Mighty Sparrow, Short Shirt of Antigua and Ras Irie of Barbados. Lord Melody, for example, wished to indicate that he was the lord of melodious singing, while King Obstinate of Antigua gained his name as a young man in his home village of Greenbay, where people declared his attitude to be stubborn. The political calypsonian Sugar Aloes of Trinidad through his name conveys two almost opposite aspects of his character: that while his singing, and perhaps he himself, may be sweet, his calypsoes are so scathing as to be bitter for those about whom he sings.

== Calypsonians of the 20th century ==
- Arrow
- Atilla the Hun
- Harry Belafonte
- Lionel Belasco
- Walter Ferguson
- The Duke of Iron
- Wilmoth Houdini
- Lord Flea
- Lord Hummingbird
- Lord Invader
- Lord Kitchener
- Lord Melody
- Roaring Lion
- Mighty Sparrow
- Crazy
- Edmundo Ros
- Calypso Rose
- Singing Sandra
- Denyse Plummer
- Harry Belafonte
- Juan Luis Guerra
- Black Stalin
- Lord Shorty
- Mighty Chalkdust
- Mighty Bomber (Clifton Ryan)
- David Rudder
- Winston Soso
- Sugar Aloes
- Serenata Guayanesa
- Winston "Gypsy" Peters
- Lord Beginner
