= Chalkdust =

Trinidad and Tobago calypsonian (born 1940)

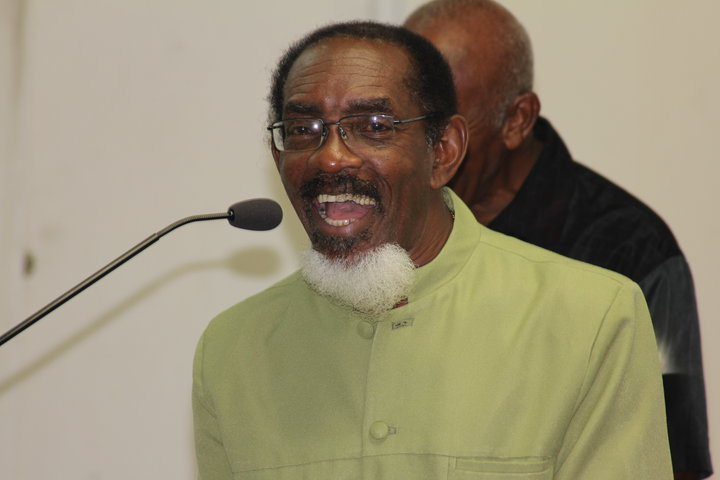
- Chalkdust giving a talk at Embassy of the United States, Port of Spain, 2010
- Born: Hollis Urban Lester Liverpool; 6 March 1940 (age 86); Chaguaramas, Crown colony of Trinidad and Tobago
- Other name: Chalkie
- Known for: Study of carnival and calypso in Trinidad and Tobago
- Awards: Prince Claus award

Academic background
- Education: University of Michigan (Ph.D., 1993)
- Thesis: Rituals of Power and Rebellion: The Carnival Tradition in Trinidad and Tobago (1993)

Academic work
- Discipline: History
- Institutions: University of the Virgin Islands
- Main interests: Ethnomusicology
- Notable works: Rituals of Power and Rebellion

Hollis Urban Lester Liverpool, better known as Chalkdust or Chalkie (born 1940), is a Trinidad and Tobago calypsonian. He has been singing calypso since 1967 and has recorded more than 300 calypsos.

== Awards ==
He is a nine-time winner of Trinidad's Calypso Monarch competition, most recently in 2017. Chalkdust's winning song performances for these most acclaimed Calypso Crowns are: 1976 *("No Smut For Me" and "Ah Put On Meh Guns Again"); 1977 ("My Way Of Protest" and "Shango Vision"); 1981 ("Ah Can't Make" and "My Kind of Worry"); 1989 ("Chauffeur Wanted" and "Carnival Is The Answer"); 1993 ("Kaiso Sick in de Hospital" and "Misconceptions"); 2004 ("Fish Monger" and "Trinidad in the Cemetery"); 2005 ("I in Town Too Long" and "Ah Doh Rhyme"); lastly in 2009 (Doh Touch My Heart). Before only the Mighty Sparrow had more wins in that competition, until 2009 when Chalkdust also achieved eight wins in the Calypso Monarch. Chalkdust also won Carifesta in 1976, the World Calypso King title in St. Thomas, US Virgin Islands, eight times, and the Calypso King of the World in New York City on the two occasions when that competition was held.

=== 1976 Calypso Monarch ===
An error has been perpetuated in which Chalkdust is listed in many fora as having sung ‘Three Blind Mice’ as one of his compositions in 1976, the first year he won the calypso monarch title. In fact, his other calypso was ‘No Smut For Me’. That competition was broadcast ‘live’ on Trinidad and Tobago Television.

The judges score sheets at the National Archives on St Vincent Street, Port-of-Spain, record him as having sung – and being judged on – 'No Smut For Me' and 'Ah Put On Me Guns Again'; and Chalkdust himself has confirmed this since.

In a piece in the series, ‘Interview With An Icon’, published in the online magazine, ‘Paradise Pulse’, which was done prior to him winning his ninth title in 2017, Chalkdust was asked the following: “You have been the Calypso Monarch of Trinidad and Tobago on eight occasions, a record which you share with the Mighty Sparrow. Which win was your most memorable and why?”

He replied: “Tough question. All my wins mean the world to me. If you were to push bamboo under my nails, I would answer that it was my first win [in 1976] when I sang the songs ‘Ah Put On Meh Guns Again’ and ‘Why Smut’ [listed on the record as, ‘No Smut For Me’]. That put me on the map and people sat up and took me seriously.”

This gives the lie to those listings that record him as having sung ‘Three Blind Mice’ that year.

Similarly, in 1977, his offerings were,'Shango Vision' and 'My Way Of Protest'. 'Juba Dubai' was not sung at the 1977 calypso monarch competition.

== Other activities ==
Chalkdust, who holds a Ph.D. in history and ethnomusicology from the University of Michigan, is an assistant professor of history at the University of the Virgin Islands, and frequently lectures and offers workshops on the history and culture of calypso music. He is the author of the books Rituals of Power and Rebellion (2001) and From the Horse's Mouth (2003), a socio-cultural history of calypso from 1900 to 2003.

=== Bibliography ===
- Liverpool, Hollis (2001). Rituals of Power and Rebellion: The Carnival Tradition in Trinidad and Tobago, 1763-1962. Frontline Distribution International. ISBN 0948390808.
- Liverpool, Hollis (2003). From the Horse's Mouth: An Analysis of Certain Significant Aspects in the Development of the Calypso and Society as Gleaned from Personal Communication with Some Outstanding Calypsonians. Juba Publications. ISBN 9768194138.

== Sources ==
- "Dr. Liverpool "Chalkdust" Favours Calypso In Schools". The Anguillan. 19 May 2006.
