= Atilla the Hun (calypsonian) =

Trinidadian calypsonian (1927–2006)

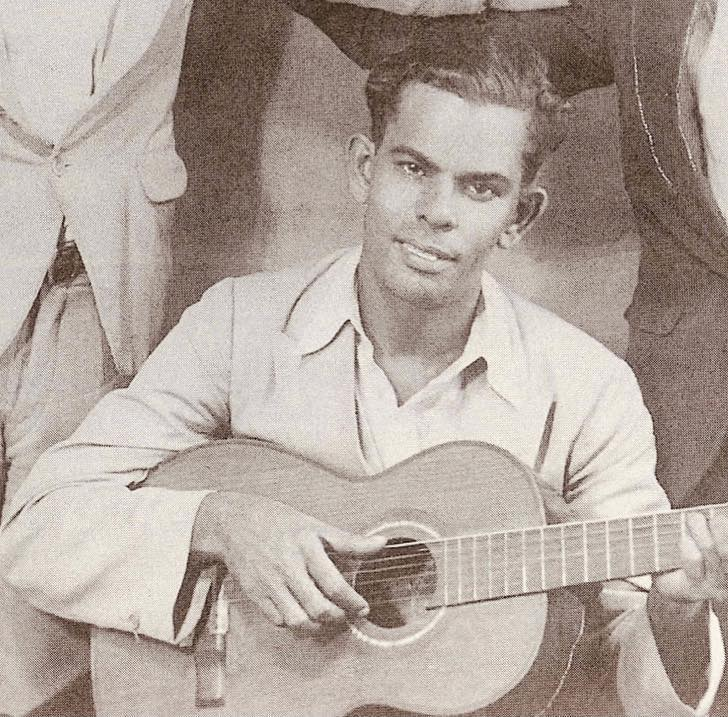
Atilla ca. 1938-1940

Raymond Quevedo (24 March 1892 – 22 February 1962), better known as Atilla the Hun, was a calypsonian from Trinidad. He began singing in 1911 and was at his most prominent in the 1930s and 1940s. He was one of the pioneers in spreading awareness of calypso beyond its birthplace in Trinidad and Tobago. Together with the Roaring Lion (Rafael de Leon) he brought calypso to the United States for the first time in 1934. One of his popular calypsos was "FDR in Trinidad", commemorating U.S. President Franklin Delano Roosevelt's 1936 trip to Trinidad.

Atilla competed in the first Calypso King contest in 1939, and won the title in both 1946 and 1947.

Known as a defender of the poor, Atilla was able to transition to a political career. When several of his records were censored he composed "The Banning of Records", which was itself banned.

Atilla was the first calypsonian to hold elected public office; he was elected to the Port of Spain City Council in 1946 and was elected to the Legislative Council of Trinidad and Tobago in 1950 representing the St. George County East. (See: Elections in Trinidad and Tobago). He also authored Atilla's Kaiso: A Short History of Trinidad Calypso with John La Rose, published posthumously in 1983.
