= Lord Kitchener (calypsonian) =

Trinbagonian calypsonian (1922–2000)

Lord Kitchener HBM
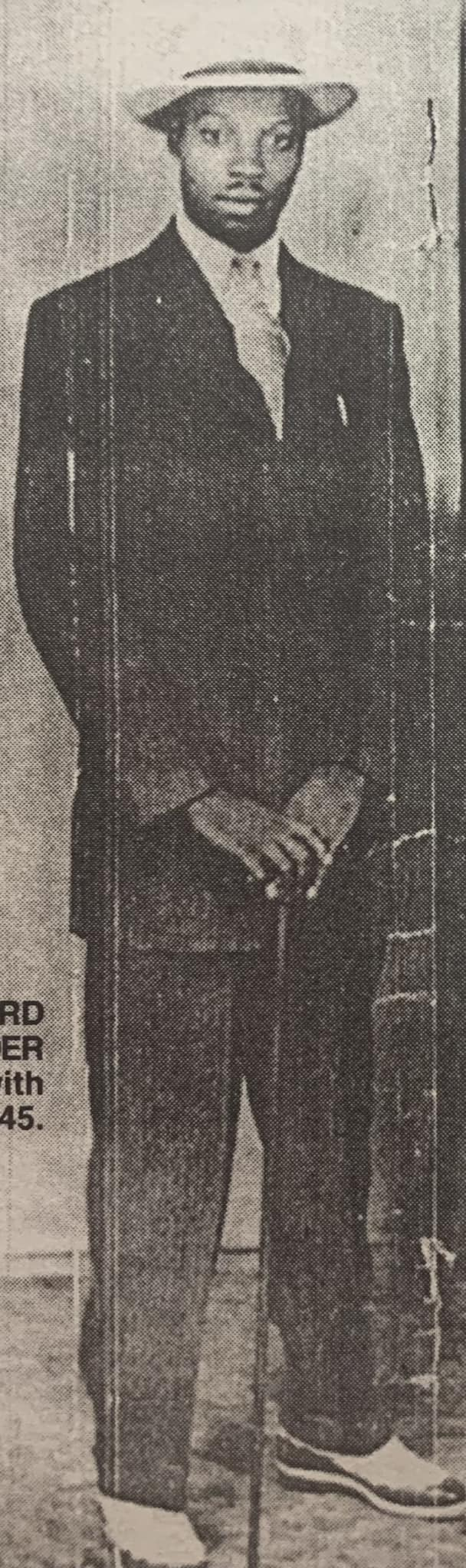
- Kitchener in 1945

Background information
- Born: Aldwyn Roberts; 18 April 1922; Arima, Trinidad and Tobago
- Died: 11 February 2000 (aged 77) Port of Spain, Trinidad and Tobago
- Genres: Calypso; soca
- Occupation: Calypsonian
- Labels: RCA Victor; Trinidad; Charlie's; JW Productions

Aldwyn Roberts (18 April 1922 – 11 February 2000), better known by the stage name Lord Kitchener (or "Kitch"), was a Trinidadian calypsonian. He has been described as "the grand master of calypso" and "the greatest calypsonian of the post-war age".

== Early life ==
Roberts was born in Arima, Trinidad and Tobago, the son of a blacksmith, Stephen, and housewife, Albertha. He was educated at the Arima Boys Government School until he was 14, when his father died, leaving him orphaned. His father had encouraged him to sing and taught him to play the guitar, and he became a full-time musician.

== Music career ==
In 1943, Roberts moved to Port of Spain, the capital of Trinidad, where he joined the Roving Brigade. He was spotted singing "Mary I Am Tired and Disgusted" (aka "Green Fig") with the Brigade by Johnny Khan, who invited him to perform in his Victory Tent. It was there he met fellow calypsonian Growling Tiger, who decided Roberts should be known as Lord Kitchener. He became known as an innovator, introducing musical and lyrical changes, including frequent criticism of the British government's control of the island. During World War II, Kitchener became popular with US troops based on the island, leading to performances in New York. After the war in early March 1946, the Trinidad and Tobago Carnival took place, during which Kitchener won his first official Road March title with a catchy calypso leggo called "Jump In The Line".

He toured Jamaica for six months in 1947–48 with Lord Beginner (Egbert Moore) and Lord Woodbine (Harold Phillips) before they took passage on the Empire Windrush to England in 1948. Upon his arrival at Tilbury Docks, Kitchener performed the specially-written song "London Is the Place for Me", which he sang live on a report for Pathé News. Within two years, Kitchener was a regular performer on BBC radio and was much in demand for live performances. He found further success in the UK in the 1950s, building a large following in the expatriate communities of the West Indian islands and having hits with "Kitch", "Food from the West Indies", "Tie Tongue Mopsy", and "Alec Bedser Calypso", while remaining popular in Trinidad and Tobago.

His prominence continued throughout the 1950s, when calypso achieved international success. Kitchener became a very important figure to those first 5,000 West Indian migrants to the UK. His music spoke of home and a life that they all longed for but in many cases could not or would not return to. He immortalised the defining moment for many of the migrants in writing the "Victory Calypso" with its lyrics "Cricket, Lovely Cricket" to celebrate the West Indies cricket team's first victory over England in England, in the Second Test at Lord's in June 1950. This was one of the first widely known West Indian songs, and epitomised an event that historian and cricket enthusiast C. L. R. James defined as crucial to West Indian post-colonial societies.

Kitchener opened a nightclub in Manchester, and had a successful residency at The Sunset in London. Further US performances followed in the mid-1950s. In the 1950s, he composed "Bebop Calypso".

In 1962, he returned to Trinidad, where he and the Mighty Sparrow dominated the calypso competitions of the '60s and '70s. Lord Kitchener won the Road March competition 10 times between 1963 and 1976, more often than any other calypsonian. For 30 years, he ran his own calypso tent, Calypso Revue, within which he nurtured the talent of many calypsonians. Calypso Rose, David Rudder, Black Stalin and Denyse Plummer are among the many artists who got their start under Kitchener's tutelage. Later he moved towards soca, a related style, and continued recording until his death. Kitchener's compositions were enormously popular as the chosen selections for steel bands to perform at the annual National Panorama competition during Trinidad Carnival. He won his only Calypso King title in 1975 with "Tribute to Spree Simon". He stopped competing in 1976.

Kitchener saw the potential of the new soca phenomenon of the late 1970s and adopted the genre on a string of albums over the years that followed. In 1977 he recorded his most commercially successful song, and one of the earliest major soca hits, "Sugar Bum Bum", which became a big hit for the 1978 Trinidad Carnival season.

In 1993, a campaign was launched for Kitchener to receive the island's highest civilian honour, the Trinity Cross. The government declined but offered him a lesser honour, which he turned down.

Having been diagnosed with bone marrow cancer, Kitchener retired in 1999 after delivering a final album, Vintage Kitch. He died on 11 February 2000 of a blood infection and kidney failure at the Mount Hope Hospital in Port of Spain. He is buried in the Santa Rosa Cemetery in Arima.

Kitchener is honoured with a statue in Port of Spain. A bust of him is also on display on Hollis Avenue, Arima, not far from the Arima Velodrome.

== Family ==
In 1952, Kitchener met his future wife, Elsie Lines. They married in 1953, and lived for a period in Manchester where Kitchener ran a nightclub. The couple adopted a baby named Tyrone Roberts, and the family of three moved back to Trinidad. Kitchener and Elsie divorced in 1968. He later partnered with Valerie Green with whom he had four children (Christian, Kernel, Quweina and Kirnister Roberts), and had a relationship with Betsy Pollard.

Kitchener's son Kernal Roberts is also a performer, playing drums for soca band Traffik in the 1990s and for Xtatik in the early 2000s. He was also their musical director and is a composer of multiple Soca Monarch and Road March titles.

== Merits ==
Winner of Carnival Road March
| Year | Song |
|---|---|
| 1946 | "Jump in Line" |
| 1963 | "The Road" |
| 1964 | "Mama dis is Mas" |
| 1965 | "My Pussin'" |
| 1967 | "Sixty Seven" |
| 1968 | "Miss Tourist" |
| 1970 | "Margie" |
| 1971 | "Mas in Madison Square Garden" |
| 1973 | "Rainorama" |
| 1975 | "Tribute to Spree Simon" |
| 1976 | "Flag Woman" |

Winner of Calypso Monarch
| Year | Song 1 | Song 2 |
|---|---|---|
| 1975 | "Tribute to Spree Simon" | "Fever" |
| 1981 | "Carnival Baby" (later redone by Alison Hinds) | |

== Discography ==
- Birth of Ghana Birth (1957)
- Calypso Kitch (1960), RCA Victor
- Lord Kitchener (1964), RCA Victor
- Mr. Kitch (1965), RCA Victor
- King of Calypso (1965), Melodisc
- Kitch 67 (1966) RCA Victor
- King of the Road (1969), Tropico
- Sock It to Me Kitch (1970), Tropico
- Curfew Time (1971), Trinidad
- Hot Pants (1972), Trinidad/Straker's
- We Walk 100 Miles with 'Kitch' (1973), Trinidad
- Tourist in Trinidad with Kitch (1974), Trinidad
- Carnival Fever (1975), Trinidad
- Sings Calypsos (With And Without Social Significance) (1975), Sounds of the Caribbean
- Home for Carnival (1976), Kalinda
- Hot and Sweet (1976), Charlie's
- Melody Of The 21st Century (1977), Charlie's
- Spirit of Carnival (1978), Trinidad
- Shooting with Kitch (1980), Charlie's
- Kitch Goes Soca - Soca Jean (1980), Charlie's
- Authenticity (1981), Charlie's
- 200 Years Of Mass (1982), Charlie's
- Simply Wonderful (1983), Trinidad
- The Master At Work (1984), Kalico
- The Grand Master (1986), B's
- Kitch On The Equator (1986), Benmac
- TrinGhana "Haunting Melodies" (1987), Trinighana - with Little Joe Ayesu
- 100% Kitch (1987), B's
- A Musical Excursion (1989), JW Productions
- The Honey In Kitch (1991), MC Productions
- Roadmarch & Panorama King Still #1 (1991), JW Productions
- Longevity (1993), JW Productions
- Still Escalating (1994), JW Productions
- Ah Have It Cork (1995), JW Productions
- Incredible Kitch (1996), JW Productions
- Symphony On The Street (1997), JW Productions
- Classic Kitch (1999), JW Productions

== Bibliography ==
The first biographical work on Lord Kitchener, Kitch: A Fictional Biography of A Calypso Icon, by UK-based Trinidadian author Anthony Joseph, was published in June 2018. The book was shortlisted for The 2019 Republic of Consciousness Prize, the Royal Society of Literature's Encore Award and the Bocas Prize for Caribbean Literature. In 2015 Joseph also presented a 30-minute radio documentary Kitch! for BBC Radio 4, which is available via the BBC Radio 4 website.

== See also ==
- Jump in the Line (Shake, Señora)
