= Lord Executor =

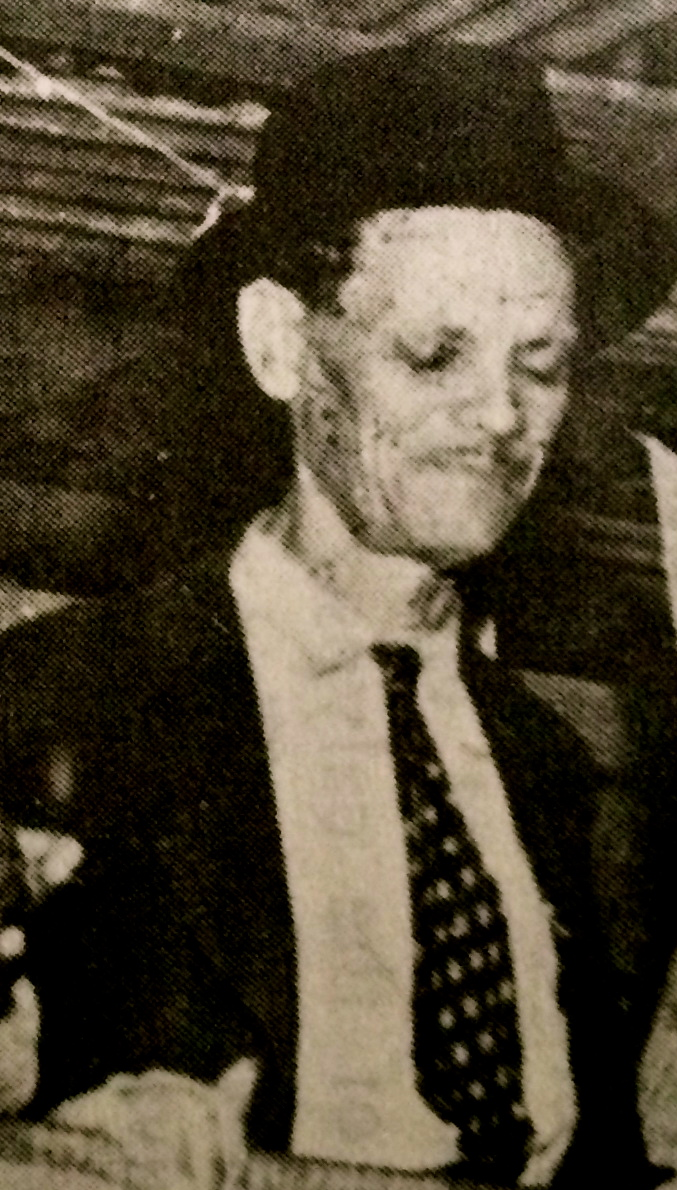
- Lord Executor ca. 1937

Background information
- Born: Philip Garcia ca. 1878-1884; Port of Spain (possibly Laventille)
- Died: 9 August 1952 Belmont, Port of Spain
- Genres: Calypso

Lord Executor (c. 1878-84 – 1952) was a Trinidadian calypsonian (calypso singer/composer). He belonged to the first generation of calypso pioneers that consisted of Julian Whiterose (Iron Duke; not to be confused with The Duke of Iron), Norman le Blanc (Richard, Coeur de Leon), Henry Forbes the Inventor (Senior Inventor) and Black Prince (Christopher Howell). Unlike these other early figures, however, Executor recorded extensively during the golden age of calypso of the 1930s and early 1940s, producing 28 record sides (78-rpm) and directly exerting influence on the second generation of calypsonians he worked alongside. According to the Roaring Lion, Executor "helped raise the general standard of the Calypso genre, gaining it more respect and acceptability in the public eye".

== Early life ==
Lord Executor (sometimes mistakenly listed as Lord Executioner) was born Philip Garcia in Port of Spain, Trinidad (possibly in the suburb of Laventille) in around 1880; dates cited range from 1878 to 1884. He was a white Creole of Portuguese descent and his parents may have been Venezuelans. He attended a prestigious secondary school – either St. Mary's College or Queen's Royal College – and maintained a reputation throughout his career for erudition; in addition to English, he spoke fluent French Patois, Portuguese and Spanish.

His singing career seems to have started sometime between 1897 and 1901, when he was working as a store clerk at Salvatori Scott & Co. in Port of Spain and joined a carnival band composed of store clerks, which was called the Crescent Boys band. After being fired from his position as a clerk, he occasionally worked as a sign painter, but was a professional singer during carnival season. In 1905, he joined the "Iere Belles" calypso tent band, which was the arch-rival of Norman le Blanc's "White Rose" band.

== Golden Era ==
In the 1910s, he had established himself as a leading calypsonian, with a special reputation for his abilities in calypso war (or "picong") competitions. These competitions required calypsonians to improvise choruses of calypso with lyrics that criticised or undermined their opponents. The Executor regularly "executed" his adversaries, but lost in one notable contest in 1914 against Henry Forbes the Inventor. Inventor improvised a verse which ended by calling Executor a "half-scald mulatto", and this apparently caused Executor to hesitate with his response, thereby losing the day. It was around this time that Atilla the Hun, who first performed calypso in 1911, became Executor's apprentice. By the end of the decade, Executor was probably the most prominent figure in calypso.

Executor participated in calypso shows held in theatres, which served to lend the music a greater measure of respectability; in one such show, held at the New Theatre in San Fernando in 1929, he appeared "disguised" as a "Tea Planter", and at a later calypso drama show in 1933 he played the defence counsel in a courtroom drama which also featured Atilla and Lion. In 1929, Executor joined a group of calypsonians, including Atilla, to establish a carnival tent called the Toddy Syndicate (after their sponsors, producers of a popular chocolate drink). 1929 was also the year that Wilmoth Houdini recorded his first ‘picong’ attacking Executor, called "Executor Doomed to Die"; Houdini was based in New York, but had competed against Executor in calypso wars back in Trinidad in the 1910s.

Executor continued to be involved in tent management during the 1930s, building a calypso tent on Henry Street in Port of Spain in collaboration with young calypsonians King Radio and Lord Beginner. His improvisational mastery during this period is attested to by the following anecdote from Roaring Lion, concerning a 1935 calypso tent competition to improvise a verse about the "Dancow" brand of milk that was sponsoring the tent. After efforts by Lion, Radio, Beginner, Atilla and Growler, Executor won the prize by coming up with the following on the spur of the moment:

"Doctors and scientists have all declared,

That Dancow Milk must be sold everywhere,
Doctors and scientists have all declared,
That Dancow Milk must be sold everywhere,
For these are not the days of fable,
So you must look for the Cow on the label,
You may say what you may, even take it anyhow,
But give the fame to Dancow
Dancow means reliability
It's full cream and renowned for its palatability
It gives you vim, it gives you pep and gives you vitality
One tea spoon of Dancow contains a bag of energy
It's good for the bouncing baby but it's better for the old, old lady

So say what you may, even take it anyhow but give the fame to Dancow."

In 1937, Executor sailed to New York with Roaring Lion, Atilla the Hun and Lord Caresser to record for Decca. He recorded 15 sides (78-rpm) including his classic duet with Caresser, "Old Ginger", and also "War", in which the four visitors from Trinidad issue challenges to New York resident Wilmoth Houdini. 1937 did not end well for Executor; however, he received an eye injury while chopping wood and subsequently found himself recovering in the hospital on Christmas day, as he explains in the lyrics to, ‘How I Spent my Time at the Hospital’. Nevertheless, Executor was to record more classic sides for Decca in 1938, 1939 and 1940.

== Final years ==
In the 1940s, Executor continued to perform in calypso tents, but less frequently since his popularity and health were both waning. In 1947, he became involved in a lawsuit over the authorship of "Rum and Coca-Cola", a calypso which provided a big hit for the Andrews Sisters and a major financial boost to Decca Records in 1945. Lionel Belasco sued on the grounds that he had written the song in 1906, and in order to rebut this claim, a statement from Executor was produced to the effect that he had already known the melody back in 1893. Gerald Clark, a New York-based Trinidadian bandleader whose "Caribbean Serenaders" accompanied many great calypso recordings, was called by Belasco's lawyers to attest to the unreliability of Executor’s testimony. Clark said that Executor was a "bum", "incoherent" and that he begged for a living – "I was glad to give him a dollar and get rid of him", Clark said. Although this suited Belasco's case, Executor was indeed in serious decline by this time, but did still manage to sing in calypso tents in both 1948 and 1949, on the latter occasion to celebrate his 50th year as a calypsonian.

In 1949, he went blind, after suffering from deteriorating eyesight for many years, and by 1952 he was living in poverty on the charity of friends. In recognition of his plight, Radio Trinidad raised a benefit fund for him, which provided the opportunity for a final calypso:

"The technical beauty of my elaborate praise

It must be mentioned by generations for many days
I, Executor, Calypso King
Now at the very moment that I was called to sing
What I have done to all mankind
Must be remembered as I'm getting blind
So come and hear the story of my fatal misfortune

In this colony."

Lord Executor died on August 9, 1952, in his home in Belmont, Port of Spain. In his book about the history of calypso, Atilla the Hun rated Executor as the greatest calypsonian of all time.
