= Black Prince (musician, born 1880) =

Trinidadian Calypsonian musician

- Born: Christopher Howell ca. 1880
- Died: after 1940
- Occupation: Calypsonian
- Years active: 1900-1940

Black Prince (born c. 1880) was a Trinidadian calypsonian. He was one of only three of the first-generation calypso pioneers to record, the others being Iron Duke, who made the first (vocal) calypso record in 1914, and Lord Executor, who recorded extensively from 1937 to 1940.

== Career ==
Like other early calypsonians such as Richard Coeur de Leon (Norman Le Blanc) and Iron Duke (Julian Whiterose), Christopher Howell took his calypso name from a famous English military commander, namely Edward the Black Prince (1330–1376). The first mention of Black Prince's career is in a recollection from Lord Executor about the time when calypso started to be performed more widely in dedicated calypso tents, which was around 1900. This led to “the competition becoming quite fierce in Port of Spain”, so the leading calypsonians began to “scatter” from the capital, says Executor, with Black Prince moving to Tunapuna, the town where Marxist historian C.L.R. James was born in 1901. Some insight into Black Prince's performance style in these early years may be gleaned from Executor's 1938 calypso, “They Say I Reign too Long”, in which Executor recounts his various victories in calypso picong dual contests, Black Prince being among the Executor's victims: “Then came Black Prince, with his armour on; Boastful, antagonistic and full of scorn; And in chains of bondage the villain was bound; And cast in a dungeon far underground.”

In 1933, the Trinidad newspaper Daily Mirror published Black Prince's suggestions on how the Carnival calypso competitions should be organised, referring to him as a “singer of Belmont”, the suburb of Port of Spain where Executor lived. Black Prince “strongly advises the authorities to stop ... the half nude Jab Malisa”, referring to a carnival costume of a devil covered in grease or molasses. During that carnival season, Black Prince sang in a calypso tent on Henry Street alongside fellow calypsonians Executor, King Radio, Lord Beginner, Railway Douglas (aka. Chieftain Douglas), Inveigler and The Owl. In 1934, he performed a calypso about a recent news story concerning a man who murdered his sweetheart and then killed himself with dynamite, which included the lines, "Was it love, envy or jealousy; That caused the dynamite tragedy?" In 1935 Black Prince competed in a calypso competition against Roaring Lion, Growling Tiger, Atilla the Hun, Railway Douglas, Lord Executor and Lord Beginner, in which the competitors had to write and perform a calypso about the recent death of Mikey Cipriani, an aviation pioneer and cricketer who had died in a plane crash.

Black Prince recorded 4 calypsos between 1938 and 1939 which are available on Bear Records’ West Indian Rhythm box-set (2006): “The Bamboo Band”, “School Boys’ Adventure”, “I Want a Radio at Home” and “You Pelt Me Bundle Before the Door”; only the first 2 of these were originally issued. “You Pelt Me Bundle Before the Door” (i.e. you throw a bag containing my possessions onto the doorstep), a song about his lover abandoning him and taking his valuables, was recorded at a 1939 session for Decca, in which Black Prince and Lord Ziegfield recorded 12 calypsos between them; only “You Pelt Me Bundle” was mastered and none were originally issued. “School Boys’ Adventure” is the best known Black Prince performance nowadays, due to its being included on various calypso compilations. It tells the story of 7 reckless but lucky Trinidadian schoolboys who rowed a fishing boat out to sea to look at the French cruise ship Normandie as it sailed past the island of Trinidad – the tide carried the boys to Venezuela where they were rescued. "The Stars", recorded in 1939, lists 58 female stars, including Mae West and Joan Crawford, that Black Prince claims to have met in New York. "At Any Moment War May Declare" calls for an immediate end to appeasement: "Should the powers fail to stop Germany right now; The Balkan states like the others will have to bow; Italy is also out seeking expansion; Undoubtedly Japan has the said ambition". Black Prince is last heard of when he wrote a letter to the calypso censorship authorities, dated February 10, 1940, while living on Eastern Main Road in the town of Saint Joseph, Trinidad.

There is another calypsonian who uses the name Black Prince, Kenroy Smith (1944-); he recalls being given his calypso name by Lord Commander, but makes no mention of this being a reference to the earlier Black Prince.
