= Lord Caresser =

Trinidadian calypsonian

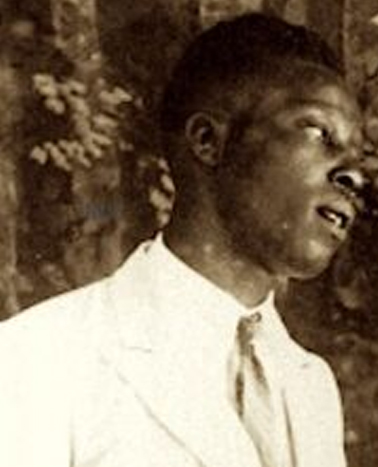
- Lord Caresser ca. 1936

Background information
- Born: Rufus Callender; 1910; San Fernando, Trinidad and Tobago
- Died: 1976 (aged 65–66) Regina, Saskatchewan, Canada
- Genres: Calypso
- Years active: 1936 – late 1950s

Rufus Callender (1910–1976), better known as Lord Caresser, was a Trinidadian calypsonian (calypso singer/composer). He is best known for his 1937 recording of "Edward the VIII" (a.k.a. "Love, Love Alone"), a calypso about the 1936 Abdication of Edward VIII of England. This was one of the best-selling records in the golden age of calypso of the 1930s and early 1940s, and generated further hits for Jamaican singer Lord Flea and American singer Harry Belafonte when they covered it in the 1950s.

== Early life ==
Caresser was born Rufus Callender in San Fernando, Trinidad in 1910. His father was Venezuelan, and his mother was Trinidadian. His mother died when he was four and Caresser was brought up by his grandmother and aunt; his unrecorded 1945 calypso "I ain’t got no papa" suggests that he had no knowledge of his father. Caresser moved to Port-au-Prince in Haiti in the late 1920s or early 1930s, where, according to a story he later told, a witch doctor gave him a ring decorated with the image of a snake. The ring was supposed to have the power to attract crowds, but Caresser threw it away when he noticed the snake moving as he passed by a church.

== Golden era ==
By 1936, Caresser was back in Trinidad and singing calypso at the Crystal Palace tent in the Port of Spain carnival. He took first prize in the Besson Street singing competition, with another important newcomer, the Growler, taking second place. In 1937, Caresser sailed to New York with Roaring Lion, Atilla the Hun and Lord Executor to record for Decca. The first recording Caresser made turned out to be the biggest hit of his career, ‘Edward the VIII’. It was one of 14 sides (78-rpm) which he recorded for Decca on this trip; others include his classic duet 'Old Ginger' with the veteran calypsonian Executor, and also "War", in which the four visitors from Trinidad issue challenges to Wilmoth Houdini, the Trinidadian calypsonian who made his home in New York and became the most prolific calypso recording artist of the era.

In 1938, Caresser recorded another 12 sides for Decca, but this time the recordings were made in Trinidad. After appearing at the 1938 carnival, Caresser went on tour to Guyana with popular Guyanese singer Bill Rogers; Caresser later recorded the calypso "So Many Women" to boast of the welcome he received on this tour. Performing in the capital, Georgetown, as part of a vaudeville show that included dancers, comedians, and impersonators, Caresser sang his recently recorded calypsos "Madam Khan" and "The More They Try to Do Me Bad (The Better I Live in Trinidad)". When the troupe left Georgetown to continue their tour, however, Caresser stayed behind, possibly because of a falling out with Rogers; in his calypso "No Surrender", Caresser calls the "bhaaji composer" (a reference to Rogers’s most famous song, "B.G. Bargee") an "old-time flouncer" and "sweetie vendor" (Rogers also worked as a confectioner).

During his stay in Georgetown, Caresser began a romantic relationship with the famous dancer Peggy Daniels, later known as "The Rhumba Queen". Daniels had performed in Trinidad in 1936 and so impressed the Roaring Lion that he recorded a calypso in her honour, "Peggy Daniels" ("That woman was so tantalizing; The kind of dance she did was surprising"). Caresser's own calypso for her, "Peggy Dearie", ends with "the Lord and his fiancée joining hands in matrimony" and tells of a romantic boat trip they seem to have taken together ("Oh, Peggie dearie, I want to spend me honeymoon in the Mazaruni"); but whether or not Caresser and Daniels did actually marry is not known. In any case, they were performing together in Trinidad in early 1939 and continued to do so until at least 1944. In 1945, with calypso more popular than ever in the USA due to the success of Lord Invader's "Rum and Coca-Cola", Caresser planned a North American tour with 22-year old newcomer, Lord Kitchener. The tour never happened, but Caresser did make some successful appearances in Jamaica later that year.

== Canadian years ==
In 1947, Caresser moved to Canada after securing a 5-year contract with the Canadian Broadcasting Corporation (CBC) to record a regular radio show. "The Lord Caresser Show" ran weekly from May 1946 to June 1948, using "The More They Try to Do Me Bad" as its theme song. The show was broadcast in Canada on the Trans-Canada network, in the West Indies on CBC International, and by relay on the BBC (UK), ABC (Australia), New Zealand Broadcasting Corporation, and SABC (South Africa). Caresser continued to make occasional appearances on CBC until 1952. In 1948, he moved to the UK, where Lord Kitchener and Lord Beginner had already achieved success, and wrote an article entitled "Calypso and Jazz" which was published in Jazz Journal in 1949. Caresser returned to Canada in 1950, where he performed at various venues in and around Montreal. In 1951, Lord Melody recorded the calypso "Tribute to Kitchener", a criticism of expatriate calypsonians, which includes a verse about Caresser: Melody exhorts him to return to Trinidad to write new calypsos, because Melody is sick of hearing Caresser's 1930s hits on the radio.

Caresser began a relationship with Monique Côté from Abitibi in Northern Quebec, and their first son, Camille, was born in Montreal in 1953. When Caresser went on a tour of Europe in 1955, Monique accompanied him and they were married at the British Embassy in Paris. Caresser and Monique went on to have six boys together, and the family lived in the La Belle Ville area of Montreal city. Caresser now began to work outside the entertainment industry: in the maintenance department of Sainte Justine Hospital in Montreal, and from 1960 to 1965, he is listed as an employee of the Industrial Acceptance Corporation, a finance company. At some point after 1965, it seems that he left his family to move to Saskatchewan in the Western provinces of Canada, where he died in 1976.
