= Wildflower (The Avalanches album) =

Studio album by the Avalanches
- Released: 1 July 2016
- Recorded: 2000 ("Saturday Night Inside Out"), 2011 – March 2016
- Studios: Sing Sing Studios (Melbourne, Victoria)
- Genres: Plunderphonics; neo-psychedelia; disco; hip hop; electronic
- Length: 59:41
- Labels: Modular; XL; Astralwerks
- Producer: Robbie Chater

The Avalanches chronology
Since I Left You (2000)	Wildflower (2016)	We Will Always Love You (2020)

Singles from Wildflower
- 1. "Frankie Sinatra" Released: 2 June 2016; 2. "Colours" Released: 16 June 2016; 3. "Subways" Released: 22 June 2016

Wildflower is the second studio album by Australian electronic music group the Avalanches. It was first released on 1 July 2016 on Apple Music and widely on 8 July 2016 by Modular Recordings in Australia, by XL Recordings in the United Kingdom, and by Astralwerks in the United States. It was the first album released by the band in 16 years, following their 2000 debut Since I Left You. It features multiple guest collaborators providing vocals and live instrumentation across its twenty-one tracks, including Danny Brown, MF Doom, David Berman, Toro y Moi, Warren Ellis, Jonathan Donahue, Kevin Parker, Biz Markie, and Father John Misty, amongst others. Much like its predecessor, the album features extensive sampling, especially from 1960s psychedelic music, and relates to the era through themes of counterculture and anti-establishment. Member Robbie Chater described the album's structure as a road trip from a hyperrealistic urban environment to somewhere remote and far away while on LSD.

Wildflower was stuck in development hell for many years. Following the release of Since I Left You, the Avalanches toured and continued to produce music, and worked on a wide variety of projects for over a decade, producing new tracks while also collaborating with multiple artists. The album was described in 2005 as "ambient world music", and by early 2007, the group were considering over forty tracks for an album which had become mostly hip hop-oriented. Production was restarted in 2011, led by Robbie Chater with assistance from Tony Di Blasi, but soon stalled for three years as Chater battled an autoimmune disease. The group members had also become more involved in separate projects, which pulled them away from the album. Some of their most time-consuming work included the score to King Kong, and an animated musical film described as a "hip hop version of Yellow Submarine" which lost funding and was never completed. Wildflower features several remnants from these projects, and was compiled in a fashion similar to producing a mixtape.

Teasing of the album began in April 2016, and it was formally announced in June alongside the release of its first single, an extended mix of "Frankie Sinatra" (2016). Upon its release, Wildflower received widespread acclaim from critics, who praised its production, although some compared it less favourably to Since I Left You. The album was a commercial success, reaching number one in the band's native Australia and the top ten in the United Kingdom.

== Background ==
After the release of their debut album, Since I Left You, the Avalanches continued to produce music and were touring until 2003. At least one track from the album's final cut had begun taking shape in 2000. One of the group's earliest collaborations was with Luke Steele in 2003, creating "tripped out rock 'n' roll" with both Steele and Di Blasi singing. Remnants of this project are reflected in the track "Colours" (2016). Until the mid-2000s, the group continued producing new music, although there was no coherent theme between the tracks nor any plans for a studio record. Robbie Chater was ill for three years during this time with two auto-immune diseases which left him unable to produce music. He underwent a treatment using ibogaine, a potent hallucinogenic drug. In February 2005, Darren Seltmann said the album was a work-in-progress and described it as "ambient world music". He also stated the album would include both sampling and live music. In August 2006, Modular Recordings issued a press release stating "it's sounding like everything we dared not hope for, and so much more. They've made the record of their lives basically". This was in response to a joke email which had reached the music press, in which Modular claimed it had rejected the group's new album. In January 2007, the band stated via its website that roughly 40 tracks were being considered for the record, but no estimated arrival date could be provided. Subsequent announcements and rumours were circulated for the next few years promising release dates and blaming sample clearance for the album's delay; however, no new material was released during this time.

It's so fuckin' party you will die, much more hip hop than you might expect...ended up sounding like the next logical step to [Since I Left You], we just had to go around in a big circle to get back to where we belong. and one day when you least expect it you'll wake up and the sample fairy will have left it under your pillow.

— Post on the Avalanches' official site, January 2007

Between 2010 and 2012, Ariel Pink, Jennifer Herrema and Danny Brown revealed that they had worked with the Avalanches on new music, the latter mentioning a track named "Frank Sinatra". In December 2011, the band's Twitter page released lyrics to a new song, "The Stepkids". In 2012, the group released a track entitled "A Cowboy Overflow of the Heart" featuring musician David Berman, reading a poem he composed over music by the group. A year later, the Avalanches also released a remix of Hunters & Collectors' first single "Talking to a Stranger" (1982). During this era, they also devoted a large amount of time working on the score to King Kong, a 2013 theater production which took two years to produce. In the end, only a 25-second track by the group was used in the final production. Later, they worked on a psychedelic animation project that was going to be a "hip hop version of Yellow Submarine". It was to be a feature-length animated movie released under the Avalanches' name along with an album. The animation was being produced in a classic cel animation style by an artist in South Korea, drawing influences from 1960s Japanese pop art. It was being funded privately but the money fell through two years into production and the project was never finished. The Wildflower track "The Noisy Eater" features some remains of the project. Through the projects and collaborations over the years, the group had collected enough music which could be combined into a new album, marking a similar process to how Since I Left You was built.

All former Avalanches members, with the exception of Chater and Di Blasi, had left the group by 2014. Darren Seltmann, one of the co-founders and co-producers on Since I Left You, had left the group around 2006 to focus on raising a family. In regard to the band's second album, Modular stated in February 2014, "Album sounds awesome, but there's no dates or anything planned. The official line is 'stay tuned.'" In June 2014, Jennifer Herrema mentioned Chater had written to her stating "their album was gonna be done in three weeks". The band's official Facebook page was later updated in 2015, listing James Dela Cruz as a member of the band once again.

== Production and composition ==
Wildflower was produced over the course of 16 years. The track "Saturday Night Inside Out" was originally from a mixtape in 2000 and was the first song Chater made after Since I Left You. Production for the album was not completed until March 2016. The Avalanches became more serious about building a second album around 2011–13 and booked studio time to commit themselves to the project. Until about 2014, Chater was using a Power Macintosh G3 beige with System 7 for Studio Vision, a sequencing program that ended support in 1997. The group had to max out credit cards to help finance production.

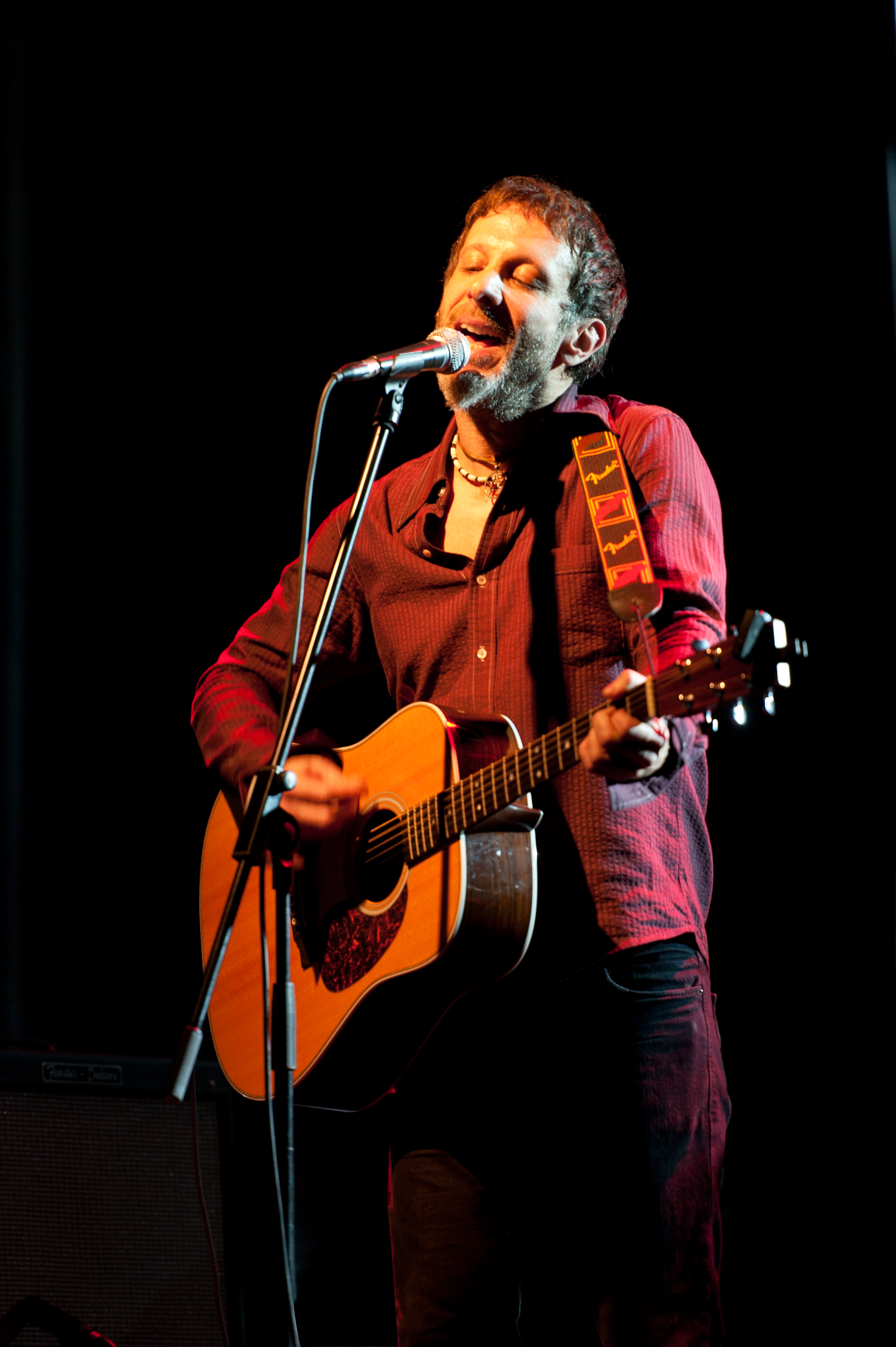
Jonathan Donahue provided vocals on three tracks as well as musical saw instrumentation on two.

The band worked with multiple guest vocalists and musicians, many of which were not included on the album's final cut. In working with vocalists, the Avalanches wanted to create vocals that meshed seamlessly with the music as if they could be samples. Jonathan Donahue of Mercury Rev provided vocals and musical saw instrumentation on multiple tracks. In addition, Kevin Parker of Tame Impala provided additional drumming on "Going Home" and violinist Warren Ellis was featured on "Stepkids". Jean-Michel Bernard also provided some orchestration to a handful of tracks. Both Danny Brown's and Biz Markie's vocals on "Frankie Sinatra" and "The Noisy Eater" respectively were done remotely. For Brown's vocals on "The Wozard of Iz", he visited Sing Sing Studios in Melbourne and had an all-night recording session with the group. Chater was a fan of MF Doom, particularly the album Madvillainy; he sent Doom a track and received a reply from him 18 months later, stating he loved the track and wanted to provide vocals. The group was thrilled to work with Camp Lo on the track "Because I'm Me", as they would often play the latter's Uptown Saturday Night at shows, and even sampled it on Since I Left You. Other guest vocalists on Wildflower include Father John Misty, Toro y Moi, Jennifer Herrema, Rye Rye, Jonti, David Berman, and A.Dd+.

"The Noisy Eater"
A cover version of the Beatles' "Come Together" as sampled in "The Noisy Eater"

Wildflower is a plunderphonics album; every track on the record is sample-based, similar to Since I Left You. The album has also been described as featuring electronic music, neo-psychedelia, disco, and hip hop throughout. When asked if Wildflower has more than the estimated 3,500 samples on the former record, Chater stated "I've got no idea...there's probably more. It's so fragmented. Every little footstep and voice and yell and clatter and cowhorn and dog barking, it's just ridiculous." The group had been clearing samples starting in 2011–12, but would occasionally need to re-negotiate when owners of the source material discovered who the Avalanches were and would request more money. The sample clearance was done by Pat Shannahan, who also cleared the samples for Since I Left You. The track "Subways" features vocals sampled from a 1980 track of the same name sung by then 12-year-old post-punk artist Chandra Oppenheim off her band's 1980 EP Transportation. Oppenheim had not heard of the Avalanches until they approached her in early 2014 for permission to sample the track, but has since become a fan of their work. The most difficult sample to clear was of a choir from Kew High School in Melbourne singing "Come Together" by The Beatles on the track "The Noisy Eater". Initially their request was refused, but Chater and Di Blasi made contact with Paul McCartney and Yoko Ono directly through "friends of friends". They sent them the track along with a letter written by Di Blasi explaining their process and in return were granted approval. The song would have not been added to Wildflower if the sample could not be cleared.

The album was not finished until the night before mastering. Chater had a flight to New York City at 7:30 in the morning. Di Blasi stated, "so we're in the studio till 6:30 that morning till he literally was like 'I gotta go man, I gotta hop on the plane.' We were like, 'we think it sounds good. Fuck it.'" Many tracks the Avalanches considered for Wildflower did not make it into the album, as they did not contribute to its overall style. Collaborators on these songs included Jens Lekman, Connan Mockasin, August Darnell, and Luke Steele. Once the style was more defined, they picked from tracks they had worked on which fell in line with others, similar to making a mix tape. The group intended to release these recordings that were closely related to Wildflower "within a year or so" of the album's release. This would help them "clean the slate" for new music. No further Wildflower era tracks were released, however, and the group's next studio album, We Will Always Love You, was released in 2020.

== Styles and themes ==
It starts in a kind of hyperrealistic urban environment, then goes on a road trip to the sea or the desert or the countryside, while you're on acid. So you start in the city and over the course of the record you end up somewhere far away from there, high as a kite.

— Robbie Chater in an interview with The Guardian

The Avalanches have described the album as a "road trip" in a "big, wide, expansive country like Australia." For inspiration, the group looked back on their teenage years of driving around the country and suburbia listening to music. The record is supposed to "capture that feeling of growing up...jumping in the car and hitting the road with a six-pack and heading out to the bush." The album attempts to capture the "halfway between happy and sad" feeling similar to old Beach Boys records which are a constant inspiration for the group. Chater felt that this feeling is what made Since I Left You a success, and they have continuously strived to create that feeling. Di Blasi thinks of Wildflower as a free-spirited person who does what they wish regardless of conventionality. The album features many samples from 1960s psychedelic music and relates to the era through counterculture and anti-establishment themes.

Chater has noted that "Sunshine" was included in the album at the last minute but is one of his favorite tracks on Wildflower. "It starts off appearing like it's a very happy, joyous song," says Chater, "but there's a twist in the tale when the sample reveals that it's actually about someone having their sunshine taken away – the blue skies turn grey. It's really a song for everybody out there who's ever lost love, who's ever been broken-hearted." The lyrics to "If I Was a Folkstar" were written by Toro y Moi about him and his wife taking LSD on the beach shortly after they got married. The title of the album, Wildflower, was chosen for its simplicity. The group was inspired by other albums with simple titles which do not distract from the music, such as Smile by the Beach Boys. The cover art is a direct reference to Sly and the Family Stone's There's a Riot Goin' On (1971) in order to draw from the record's rebellious counter-culture nature, though approaching a more psychedelic style.

== Release ==
On 12 April 2016, the Avalanches added new images of a gold butterfly on black cloth to their social media accounts and official website. At the time, some speculated this was a sign of new music forthcoming. The following day, the group was announced for three festival lineups: Splendour In The Grass, Primavera Sound, and Field Day. On 24 May, the band posted a video poking fun at their long hiatus since their last album and the continuous speculation of a follow-up release. On 2 June, the first single from the album, "Frankie Sinatra", was premiered on Australian radio station Triple J. The decision for "Frankie Sinatra" to be the lead single was not made by the group, but rather based on feedback from friends and management. In a radio interview aired immediately after the track's debut, the title of the album was revealed and a release date was provided of 8 July 2016, nearly 16 years after the release of Since I Left You. On 15 June, Zane Lowe's Beats1 show premiered a second track from the album, "Colours".

On 1 July, Wildflower was made available for streaming through music streaming service Apple Music. Apple Music had negotiated a deal to stream the album exclusively a week before its worldwide release. It was promoted through a heavy advertising campaign in Australia with television, online, and print advertising. Near the album's release, a 15-minute video titled The World of Wildflower/The Was was temporarily posted online. The video, made by Sodajerk, featured a compilation of visuals taken from films and cartoons set to music from the album.

== Critical reception ==
Professional ratings
Aggregate scores
Source	Rating
AnyDecentMusic?	7.9/10
Metacritic	83/100
Review scores
Source	Rating
AllMusic	3.5/5 stars
The A.V. Club	B+
The Guardian	4/5 stars
The Independent	5/5 stars
Mojo	4/5 stars
NME	2/5
Pitchfork	8.5/10
Q	4/5 stars
Rolling Stone	3.5/5 stars
Spin	8/10

Wildflower received widespread critical acclaim. At Metacritic, which assigns a normalised rating out of 100 to reviews from mainstream critics, it received an average score of 83, based on 33 reviews, indicating "universal acclaim". Prior to the album's release, radio disc jockey Zane Lowe called Wildflower a "triumph" with "incredible, tasteful collaborations." In a rave review, Andy Gill of The Independent hailed the album as "a cause for celebration, its Zappa/Beasties-style collage of voices, samples, beats, sounds, and especially laughter offering a joyous affirmation of life." Jonathan Wroble of Slant Magazine wrote that its "foggy sound [...] reveals its splendor and shape over time". Brad Shoup of Spin noted that while "the terrain is familiar, the subjects have changed," and the album as a whole "feels as though it was made for the Avalanches rather than a patient public." Pitchfork critic Mark Richardson remarked that the group's work "continues to mine a deceptively narrow emotional world—new love, childhood playfulness, wistful sadness, happy feelings of connection—but renders it better than just about any music ever made." The Guardian's Tim Jonze called Wildflower "a joyous journey" and concluded, "It's testament to the power of their original vision that it all still sounds so fresh."

Rolling Stone's Will Hermes called Wildflower "a welcome return" and wrote that "what still sets the Avalanches apart, besides their careful groove pacing, attention to detail, and uncanny ability to move you from inside a track to outside looking in, is their sweet sense of nostalgia." Writing for Exclaim!, Daryl Keating called the album "a real testament to the tenacity of the Avalanches, and one we're truly grateful for." Tim Sendra of AllMusic felt that Wildflower "falls short of expectations, but still ends up being a pretty good album anyway" and considered the abundance of guest performers, with the exception of Jonathan Donahue, to be unnecessary, concluding that the group "ended up making the best psychedelic Chemical Brothers album ever instead of making another classic Avalanches album." Emily MacKay of NME was less favourable, asking how "something that took so long [could] sound so, well, meh," and ultimately called the album "a faded snapshot of a cosier, very distant-seeming past." The album was nominated for Australian Album of the Year at the J Awards of 2016.

=== Accolades ===
Accolades for Wildflower
Publication	Accolade	Year	Rank	Ref.
Paste	The 50 Best Albums of 2016	2016	25	
Pitchfork	The 20 Best Electronic Albums of 2016	2016	—N/a	
Rough Trade	Albums of the Year	2016	77	
PopMatters	The 70 Best Albums of 2016	2016	15	
The New Zealand Herald	20 Best Albums of 2016	2016	11	
Q	50 Best Albums of the Year	2016	18	
Spin	The 50 Best Albums of 2016	2016	36	
Mixmag	The 50 Best Albums of 2016	2016	4	
The Guardian	The Best Albums of 2016	2016	15	
Loud and Quiet	Top 40 Albums of 2016	2016	6	
FasterLouder	The 50 Best Albums of 2016	2016	21	

== Track listing ==
No.	Title	Writer(s)	Sample(s) (Note: Credits adapted from the liner notes of Wildflower unless otherwise noted.)	Length
1.	"The Leaves Were Falling"	Robbie Chater; Tony Di Blasi	"The Dream World of Dion McGregor (He Talks in His Sleep)" by Dion McGregor (uncredited)	0:15
2.	"Because I'm Me"	Chater; Di Blasi; Salahadeen Wilds; Saladine Wallace; Gregory Perry; General Norman Johnson; Barney Perkins	"Want Ads", written and composed by General Johnson, Barney Perkins and Gregory Perry, and performed by Honey Cone; "Why Can't I Get It Too" by Six Boys In Trouble (uncredited)	4:12
3.	"Frankie Sinatra"	Chater; Di Blasi; Danny Brown; Daniel Dumile; Wilmoth Houdini; Richard Rodgers; Oscar Hammerstein II	"Bobby Sox Idol", written, composed and performed by Wilmoth Houdini; "My Favorite Things" written and composed by Richard Rodgers and Oscar Hammerstein II, performed by Percy Faith & His Orchestra	3:44
4.	"Subways"	Chater; Di Blasi; Chandra Oppenheim; Steven Alexander; Eugenie Diserio; Barry Gibb; Maurice Gibb; Robin Gibb; Patrick Simmons	"Subways", written and composed by Chandra Oppenheim, Steven Alexander and Eugene Diserio, and performed by Chandra; "Warm Ride", written and composed by Barry Gibb, Maurice Gibb and Robin Gibb, and performed by Graham Bonnet; "Black Water", written, composed and performed by Patrick Simmons	3:10
5.	"Going Home"	Chater; Di Blasi; B. Gibb; M. Gibb; R. Gibb; Kathy Kosins; David McMurray; Gene Dunlap; Simmons	"Subways", written and composed by Chandra Oppenheim, Steven Alexander and Eugene Diserio, and performed by Chandra; "Warm Ride", written and composed by Barry Gibb, Maurice Gibb and Robin Gibb, and performed by Graham Bonnet; "Black Water", written, composed and performed by Patrick Simmons; "Party in Me", written and composed by Kathy Kosins, David McMurray and Gene Dunlap, and performed by Gene Dunlap; The documentary film Jean-Michel Basquiat: The Radiant Child; The documentary film Streetwise (uncredited)	2:06
6.	"If I Was a Folkstar"	Chater; Di Blasi; Chaz Bundick	"You Think I Ain't Worth a Dollar, But I Feel Like a Millionaire" by Queens of the Stone Age (uncredited)	4:33
7.	"Colours"	Chater; Di Blasi; Jonathan Donahue		3:32
8.	"Zap!"	Chater; Di Blasi		1:58
9.	"The Noisy Eater"	Chater; Di Blasi; Biz Markie; John Lennon; Paul McCartney	"The Noisy Eater", performed by Jerry Lewis; "Come Together" by John Lennon and Paul McCartney	3:14
10.	"Wildflower"	Chater; Di Blasi; Jean-Michel Bernard	Putney Swope	1:14
11.	"Harmony"	Chater; Di Blasi	"Everything That Touches You", written and composed by Terry Kirkman, and performed by The Association; Spoken word from "Alphabetical Slaughter", performed by DJ Kay Slay	3:48
12.	"Live a Lifetime Love"	Chater; Di Blasi; Dionte Rembert; Arrias Walls	The film American Juggalo	2:30
13.	"Park Music"	Chater; Di Blasi	The film American Juggalo	0:54
14.	"Livin' Underwater (Is Somethin' Wild)"	Chater; Di Blasi; McCartney; Linda McCartney; Jay Ferguson	"Uncle Albert/Admiral Halsey", performed by Paul and Linda McCartney; "Water Woman", written and composed by Jay Ferguson, and performed by Spirit	1:56
15.	"The Wozard of Iz"	Chater; Di Blasi; Brown; Tommy James; Mike Vale	"Lost in Your Eyes", written and composed by Tommy James and Mike Vale, and performed by Tommy James and the Shondells	2:59
16.	"Over the Turnstiles"	Chater; James Pepper	"Witchi Tai To" written and composed by James Gilbert Pepper, and performed by Everything Is Everything	0:41
17.	"Sunshine"	Chater; Di Blasi; Sheila Young; Bobby Goldsboro	"Leave It All Behind Me", written and composed by Sheila Young, and performed by The Fuzz; "Summer (The First Time)", written, composed and performed by Bobby Goldsboro	3:37
18.	"Light Up"	Chater; Di Blasi; Randy Newman; Clarence Newton Burke; Gregory K. Fowler	"The Debutante's Ball", written and composed by Randy Newman, and performed by Harpers Bizarre; "World of Fantasy", written and composed by Clarence Newton Burke and Gregory K. Fowler, and performed by The Five Stairsteps	1:34
19.	"Kaleidoscopic Lovers"	Chater; Di Blasi; Donahue		3:55
20.	"Stepkids"	Chater; Di Blasi; Jennifer Herrema; Kurt Midness; Lou Barlow	"Raise the Bells", written and composed by Lou Barlow, and performed by The Folk Implosion	4:32
21.	"Saturday Night Inside Out"	Chater; Di Blasi; David Berman		5:07
Total length:				59:41

Digital edition bonus track
No.	Title	Length
22.	"Frankie Sinatra" (extended mix)	4:28

== Personnel ==
Credits are adapted from the liner notes of Wildflower.

The Avalanches

- Robbie Chater – production, writing, mixing, art direction
- Tony Di Blasi – writing, additional production
- James Dela Cruz
- The Avalanches – keyboards (tracks 3, 5, 9, 11, 12 and 20), melodica (track 3), accordion (tracks 3 and 12), drums (tracks 3, 11, 12, 15, 20 and 21), bass (tracks 3, 6, 7, 9, 11, 12, 17 and 19–21), guitars (tracks 4, 5, 10, 14, 15, 20 and 21), synthesisers (tracks 4, 6, 7 and 17–19), percussion (tracks 4, 6, 7, 11, 15 and 17–19), vocals (tracks 6, 7, 11, 12 and 21), Mellotron (tracks 7, 11, 14 and 17–20), munching (track 9), Moog synthesiser (tracks 10, 15 and 21), melodeon (tracks 12 and 14), orchestration (track 15), FM radio (track 21)

Additional musicians

- Camp Lo – vocals on "Because I'm Me"
  - Sonny Cheeba
  - Geechi Suede
- Danny Brown – vocals on "Frankie Sinatra" and "The Wozard of Iz"
- Doom – vocals on "Frankie Sinatra"
- Wilmoth Houdini – vocals on "Frankie Sinatra"
- Jean-Michel Bernard – orchestration on "Frankie Sinatra", "The Noisy Eater" and "Wildflower", guitar on "Wildflower"
- Rye Rye – additional vocals on "Going Home"
- Kevin Parker – additional drums on "Going Home"
- Chaz Bundick – vocals and guitar on "If I Was a Folkstar"
- Jonti Danilewitz – vocals on "If I Was a Folkstar" and "Harmony"
- A.Dd+ – vocals on "If I Was a Folkstar" and "Live a Lifetime Love"
  - Dionte "Slim Gravy" Rembert
  - Arrias "Paris Pershun" Walls
- Jonathan Donahue – vocals on "Colours", "Harmony" and "Kaleidoscopic Lovers", bowed saw on "Wildflower" and "Harmony"
- Biz Markie – vocals and munching on "The Noisy Eater"
- Leslie Ritter – vocals on "Harmony"
- Beth Chapin Reineke – vocals on "Harmony"
- Alise Marie – vocals on "Harmony"
- Shags Chamberlain – bass on "Harmony"
- Dominique Young Unique – vocals on "Live a Lifetime Love" and "The Wozard of Iz"
- Jennifer Herrema – vocals on "Stepkids"
- Kurt Midness – vocals on "Stepkids"
- Warren Ellis – violin on "Stepkids"
- David Berman – vocals on "Saturday Night Inside Out"
- Josh Tillman – vocals on "Saturday Night Inside Out"

Technical personnel

- Tony Espie – mixing
- Aaron Dobos – assistant engineering
- Michael O'Connell – assistant engineering
- Matthew Neighbour – assistant engineering
- Joe LaPorta – mastering
- Scott Petiito – recording on "Colours" and "Kaleidoscopic Lovers"
- Nadav Eisenman – recording on "Stepkids"
- Warren Ellis – recording on "Stepkids"
- Loney John Hutchins – recording on "Saturday Night Inside Out"

Artwork

- Chris Hopkins – art direction, design, illustration
- Emi Ueoka – illustration
- Fergadelic – butterfly logo
- Gen Kay – cover and inlay photography
- David Corio – Biz Markie photograph
- Kris Vierra – quilting and textiles

== Charts ==
=== Weekly charts ===
Chart (2016)	Peak position
Australian Albums (ARIA)	1
Austrian Albums (Ö3 Austria)	42
Belgian Albums (Ultratop Flanders)	19
Belgian Albums (Ultratop Wallonia)	82
Dutch Albums (Album Top 100)	49
Finnish Albums (Suomen virallinen lista)	47
French Albums (SNEP)	109
German Albums (Offizielle Top 100)	60
Irish Albums (IRMA)	11
New Zealand Albums (RMNZ)	12
Scottish Albums (Official Charts)	9
Swedish Albums (Sverigetopplistan)	46
Swiss Albums (Schweizer Hitparade)	44
UK Albums (Official Charts)	10
US Billboard 200	27

=== Year-end charts ===
Chart (2016)	Position
Australian Albums (ARIA)	39

== Certifications ==
Region	Certification	Certified units/sales
Australia (ARIA)	Platinum	70,000^{^}
^{^} Shipments figures based on certification alone.

== Release history ==
Country	Date	Format	Label
Various	1 July 2016	Streaming (Apple Music)	Modular; Astralwerks; XL; EMI
Various	8 July 2016	CD; digital download; streaming; vinyl	Modular; Astralwerks; XL; EMI
