= The Duke of Iron =

Musical artist (1906–1968)

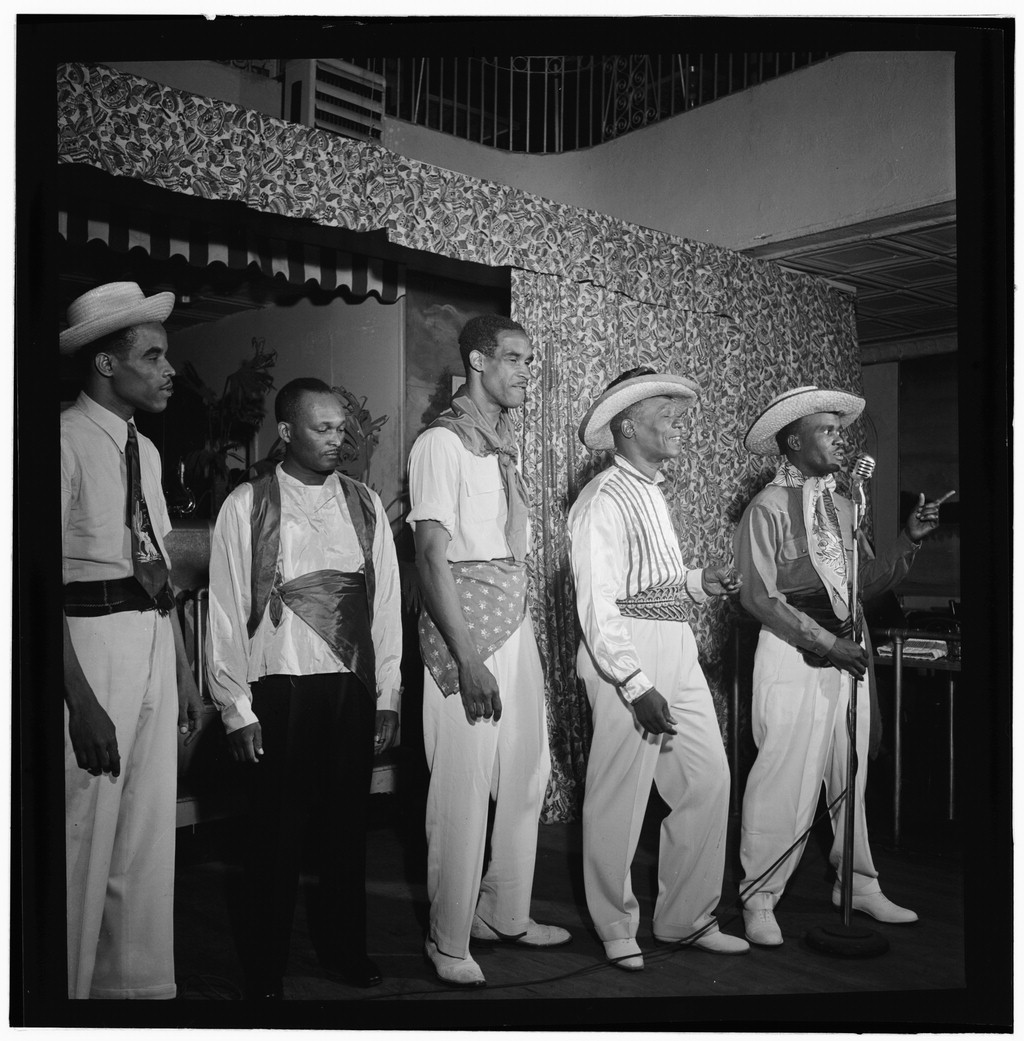
- The Duke of Iron, center

Background information
- Born: Cecil Anderson; 22 November 1906; Port of Spain, Trinidad
- Died: 17 November 1968 (aged 61) Jamaica, Queens, New York City, U.S.
- Genres: Kaiso; calypso
- Occupations: Singer; entertainer
- Years active: 1930s–1968

The Duke of Iron (born Cecil Anderson, 22 November 1906 – 17 November 1968) was a calypsonian, nightclub and concert entertainer, and recording artist from the 1930s through the 1960s. Born in Trinidad and working mainly in the United States, he was renowned for his bawdy humor, crisp diction, and confident vocal mannerisms. His clarity in pronouncing English lyrics helped him achieve tremendous popularity with American audiences.

== Biography ==
Anderson was born in Port of Spain, Trinidad, and in 1923 moved with his family to New York, where in 1927 he married Clarice McDowall, a native of Saint Vincent. In the 1930s he was a featured vocalist with the Caribbean-styled big band Felix & His Krazy Kats. He performed at a conference of folklorists in Canada during the 1930s, for which he was billed as "An Authentic Interpreter of the Kaiso.".

Anderson became a headliner on the New York club scene, which included a ten-month stint at the Village Vanguard in the 1940s. He also participated in the 1946 Calypso at Midnight! concerts produced by Alan Lomax at New York's Town Hall auditorium. In the latter part of the decade he often performed at the Caribbean Club on Seventh Avenue, New York, along with Wilmoth Houdini (billed as "King Houdini").

In 1948, he performed in the film short Wild Indian, under the name The Duke of Iron and Band. He returned to Trinidad, but made a successful return to New York in the mid-1950s during the boom in calypso music led by Harry Belafonte. During the 1950s and 1960s, he performed at Carnegie Hall, the Apollo Theater in Harlem, and at many leading nightclubs, such as the Village Gate, the Jamaican Room and the Calypso Room. He appeared in the film Calypso Joe (Allied Artists Pictures, 1957) with Angie Dickinson.

Anderson regularly returned to Trinidad to keep up with current trends in calypso, and performed and recorded many annual Carnival hits.

He died on 17 November 1968 in Jamaica, Queens, at age 62.

Jazz saxophonist Sonny Rollins, who recorded a number of Caribbean-styled instrumentals, composed and recorded a piece entitled "Duke of Iron" in his memory.

== Recording career ==
The Duke of Iron recorded singles and albums for a variety of labels, including Decca; Virgin Isle–Supertone; Varsity; Paragon; Stinson and Folkways (owned by Moses Asch); Monogram; Prestige/International; and RCA Victor. He made many recordings in the 1940s for the Monogram label, including "Marry a Woman Uglier Than You", which inspired Jimmy Soul's 1961 chart hit "If You Wanna Be Happy", and the ribald "The Big Bamboo".

He was notorious for humorous, ribald calypsos, like "I Left Her Behind For You," "Miss Constance" ("she said: I may be small, and yet/I can take on any runner when the track gets wet"), "The Naughty Fly," and "The Postman" (who has "the longest route in town/they know he rings the bell whenever he comes round"). He also wrote topical songs about radio commentator Walter Winchell and the New York Mets baseball team.

Anderson played cuatro and was reportedly an exceptional pianist. His brother George "Boysie" Anderson played flute, clarinet and saxophone, and recorded with Cecil on several of his later albums.

Some sources have erroneously alleged that Anderson, as the Duke of Iron, made the first calypso recording in 1914. Anderson was eight years old at the time. The recording in question, titled "Iron Duke in the Land," was made by calypso pioneer Henry Julian (a.k.a. Julian Whiterose). Although calypsos had originally been sung in French, by the time "Iron Duke" was recorded, calypsonians were developing the art of singing in English.
