= Young Tiger =

Trinidadian calypso-jazz crossover performer (1920–2007)

George Browne (4 May 1920 – 23 March 2007), better known as the Young Tiger, was a Trinidadian calypso musician.

== Biography ==
Born Edric Browne in Port of Spain, Trinidad and Tobago, where his childhood was imbued with the African traditions of Shango and Spiritual Baptist Shouting, he assumed the name George E. Browne in homage to his mentor and family friend, Richard E. Braithwaite, whose library introduced him to works of black history and activism.

Browne joined a Norwegian tanker at the age of 20 and, after a brief stay in Australia, signed off in Scotland in 1941. After befriending other expatriate Trinidadians in Glasgow he relocated to London and began to earn his living as a musician. In 1943 he found luck with a surprise hit, "Christmas Calypso." In 1947–48 he co-founded with Bermudian Ken Gordon (1927–2013, uncle of newsreader Moira Stuart) the Three Just Men group and toured in Europe and North Africa with the trio the following year.

During the same time, Browne worked with a minstrel show headlining Westminster's Central Hall, later involving himself as a vocalist in the chorus of a West End revival of the musical Show Boat. Afterwards, he earned extra money with a small group covering current American pop tunes.

Utilizing the calypsonian tradition of social commentary, while playing with a rhumba band at the posh Orchid Room, he put together an extemporary few bars in honour of guest Prince Philip. The staff and proprietor were aghast, but when he returned to play the next night, London's upper crust showed up for that very reason. Unfortunately, Browne had scrapped the song after being lectured by an irate manager of the Orchid Room staff. With this success behind him, he toured Paris, returning to London in 1951. In 1952 Tiger signed to Melodisc, the first British company to record calypso music.

He inherited the name Young Tiger from the calypsonian Growling Tiger when in 1953 he recorded a cover version of Tiger's song "Single Man". Young Tiger's hits dating from that same year include "Calypso Be" and "I Was There" - the latter being his observations about the Coronation of Queen Elizabeth II - and "Mamzelle Josephine". On 31 January 1955, he participated along with fellow calypsonian Kitchener in a concert billed as "The First Caribbean Carnival in London" that was held at the Royal Albert Hall.

Subsequently, embracing jazz music, Browne recorded with a number of bands, including Humphrey Lyttelton's Paseo Jazz Band. In the 1960s he pursued an acting career for a time – he played the role of Jesus Christ in a passion play produced at the First World Festival of Negro Arts in Senegal in 1966.

Abandoning calypso soon after for jazz, Browne collaborated with longtime friend and mentor Lauderic Caton at the underground Soho venue Club du Faubourg and regularly headlined at Oxford and Cambridge University balls. In 1970 he gave up music to open a London restaurant and health club with his then wife. When forced to close it because of rent increases, they moved to the United States, where for a time they had restaurants in Florida and California.

He returned to the UK in the late 1980s, living in retirement in Croydon and making ends meet by playing the stock market. His calypso "I Was There (At the Coronation)" featured on the 2002 Honest Jon compilation London Is the Place for Me 1: Trinidadian Calypso in London, 1950-1956. Following the re-release of his "Calypso Be" on London Is the Place for Me, Vol. 2 (November 2005), Browne played at the BBC "Electric Proms" festival in 2006, performing a few songs together with the London is the Place for Me Allstars. Also featured on the Honest Jon's compilations were "African Dream" and "Chicken and Rice". Eventually, Browne returned to London, and on 26 October 2006 played a live set for the release of the calypso retrospective London Is the Place for Me, Vol. 2, bringing his name to a new generation of calypso fans.

Browne died on 23 March 2007, at the age of 82, with obituaries ranging from West Indies music magazines to mainstream press such as Mojo and Rolling Stone.

== See also ==
- Mighty Sparrow
- Roaring Lion
- Growling Tiger
- Lord Kitchener
- Lord Invader
- Lord Mouse and the Kalypso Katz
- Attila the Hun
