= Spooge =

Spooge may refer to:

- a slang term for semen#Euphemisms
- Spooge (Breaking Bad), a character from the American television series Breaking Bad
- Spouge: a form of Caribbean music particularly associated with Barbados
