= Bobby Sox Idol =

"Bobby Sox Idol (Frankie Sinatra)"

Song by Wilmoth Houdini

from the album Rum and Coca-Cola
- Published: Bess Music Company
- Released: 1947
- Genre: Calypso
- Length: 2:57
- Label: Golden Century Music
- Composer(s): King Houdini and His Calypso Parliament
- Lyricist(s): Wilmoth Houdini

Bobby Sox Idol is a calypso song by Trinidadian musician Wilmoth Houdini about singer Frank Sinatra.

== Background ==
Having elements of comedy music, Bobby Sox Idol is about American singer Frank Sinatra where, in the song, Houdini encourages Sinatra to sing calypso music because his voice is suited for it:

Ah Frankie Sinatra

Ah Frank Sinatra, Frankie me boy you don't know

You have a perfect voice to sing Calypso

The song's name Bobby Sox Idol represents Frank Sinatra – The term "Bobby Sox" is derived from Bobby soxer, a neologism used for the zealous, teenage female fans of Sinatra.

=== Composition ===
It is set in common time and has a moderate tempo of 82 beats per minute. It is written in the key of C Minor.

== Pop culture ==
The song references The Andrews Sisters, Bing Crosby and Little Jimmy Dickens.

The song is sampled in Frankie Sinatra (2016) by The Avalanches.

== Track listings ==
The song is found in the albums The Calypso Way (1940) and Rum and Coca-Cola (1947).
