= Frankie Sinatra =

Single by the Avalanches featuring Danny Brown and MF Doom

from the album Wildflower
- Released: 2 June 2016
- Genre: Hip-hop; plunderphonics; electro swing; calypso
- Length: 3:44 (album version); 4:28 (extended mix)
- Label: Modular
- Songwriters: Danny Brown; Robbie Chater; Tony Di Blasi; Oscar Hammerstein II; Wilmoth Houdini; Richard Rodgers
- Producer: The Avalanches

The Avalanches singles chronology
"A Different Feeling" (2002)	"Frankie Sinatra" (2016)	"Colours" (2016)

Danny Brown singles chronology
"Detroit vs. Everybody" (2014)	"Frankie Sinatra" (2016)	"When It Rain" (2016)

MF Doom singles chronology
"Lively Hood" (2015)	"Frankie Sinatra" (2016)	"Avalanche" (2016)

"Frankie Sinatra" is a song by Australian electronic music group the Avalanches. It was released as a digital download on 2 June 2016, acting as the lead single from their second studio album, Wildflower (2016). The song, which features guest appearances from rappers Danny Brown and MF Doom, was the first piece of new material by the group in 16 years.

== Production ==
"Frankie Sinatra" is one of the oldest produced tracks on Wildflower. The track was built from a calypso record called "Bobby Sox Idol" by Wilmoth Houdini that Robbie Chater would play at a nightclub in Melbourne called "Brains". Although both Chater and Tony Di Blasi found the calypso track "strangely repetitive and annoying" at first, they soon grew a liking to it.

== Composition ==
"Frankie Sinatra" features rap verses from rappers Danny Brown and MF Doom. Regarding the reason why the Avalanches chose to work with Danny Brown on the song, in an interview with Zane Lowe on Beats 1, they stated: "We wanted to make this record still sound like us but to be a bit more loose and rock and roll. The initial plan was to make a crazy loose rock record, but with samples. Danny’s voice is almost like a punk rock voice sometimes, so we thought it’d be perfect." The song contains certain elements of electro swing with an overarching foundation in calypso music, a type of Afro-Caribbean music. It features a sample of the song "Bobby Sox Idol" by calypso artist Wilmoth Houdini. It also includes the melody of Percy Faith and His Orchestra's "My Favorite Things".

== Music video ==
The official music video for "Frankie Sinatra" was released on 2 June 2016, the day of the song's release, through YouTube and Vevo. "Carnival attendees run amok after downing glowing, hallucinogenic ice cream" is how Jason Newman of Rolling Stone described the video, feeling that it matched the song's atmosphere and "circus-like beat".

In the video, two people make and sell frozen treats with an unidentified neon-yellow liquid from a food truck labelled "Frankie's Ice Cream, The Avalanches new flavor 2016," at a carnival. Consumers, with yellow stains on their lips, have hallucinations, shown by a blue filter. The video cuts to men on airboats, then a family of four at supper, all who hallucinate and act abnormally after drinking the yellow liquid. A cut back to the carnival shows law enforcement officials looking at the woman from the family in a plastic bubble. People in hazmat suits examine collapsed people holding yellow treats, which implies they were affected by the substance. A man plays the guitar as "Frankie Sinatra" and the butterfly logo closes the video.

== Track listing ==
Digital download
No.	Title	Length
1.	"Frankie Sinatra" (extended mix)	4:28

== Charts ==
Chart (2016)	Peak position
Australia (ARIA)	34
Belgium (Ultratip Bubbling Under Flanders)	36

== Certifications ==
Region	Certification	Certified units/sales
Australia (ARIA)	Gold	35,000^{‡}
^{‡} Sales+streaming figures based on certification alone.

== Release history ==
Region	Date	Label	Format
Worldwide	2 June 2016	Modular	Digital download
