= Errol Duke =

Trinidad and Tobago musician

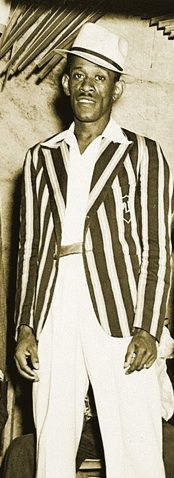
- Duke in 1943
- Born: 1911
- Died: 15 July 1952 (aged 40–41); Port of Spain, Trinidad and Tobago
- Other name: The Growler
- Occupation: Calypsonian

The Growler (1911 – July 15, 1952) was a Trinidadian calypsonian (calypso singer/composer). Growler (sometimes known as Mighty Growler or the Growling Growler) recorded 36 record sides (78-rpm) during the 1930s and 1940s, making him among the most prolific recording artists in the golden age of calypso, with only Roaring Lion, Growling Tiger, King Radio, Attila the Hun and Wilmoth Houdini exceeding his output during this period. Lord Kitchener, one of the most important figures in the later development of calypso, acknowledged Growler as one of his influences.

Growler's calypso career began in 1934. In 1936 he entered the Carnival calypso contest in Besson Street and placed 2nd to Lord Caresser (Rufus Callender). Growler made his recording debut for RCA Bluebird in 1937 with a calypso entitled 'In the Dew and the Rain'; the recording was not released, but Growler re-recorded the song for Decca in 1939, and this is the version that often features in compilations of classic calypso today. In 1938, during which Growler was the only calypsonian to record for both RCA Bluebird and Decca, he recorded his first hit, 'I Want to Rent a Bungalow', which inspired new calypsos that were composed as replies to Growler's song by the more established calypsonians Atilla the Hun ('I Don't Want no Bungalow') and Roaring Lion ('I am Going to Buy a Bungalow'). In 1939, Growler recorded 14 sides for Decca; his allegiance with the record label is immortalised with tags incorporated into the songs (e.g. by singing, 'Yes this is the Growler; Recording for the Decca!'). 'I Don't Want No Calaloo', became a road march for the 1939 carnival in Trinidad. In the same year, during which World War Two began, Growler recorded 'The Diamond Ring for Emaline', in which he fantasized about marrying a German woman called Emaline who would be given away as bride by Adolf Hitler; but at the same session he also recorded 'Hitler Demands', an unequivocal condemnation of Hitler and the Nazi regime, and the following year, 1940, the calypso 'Nazi Spy Ring', which condemns the German dictator as a 'cold-blooded murderer' and 'worthless barbarian'. Growler continued to appear in calypso tents throughout the war, but contracted an illness during a tour of British Guiana in 1944. He seems to have had health problems that reduced his ability to perform for the rest of the 1940s thereafter. He became more active in the early 1950s, and in 1952 embarked on a tour of South America with young calypsonians Small Island Pride, Lord Wonder, Mighty Terror and Mighty Zebra. When he returned to Trinidad from this tour, however, he was very ill and died two days later in Port of Spain.
