= Lord Mouse and the Kalypso Katz =

Background information
- Also known as: Lord Mouse
- Origin: Berlin, Berlin, Germany
- Genres: Calypso, Mento
- Years active: 2008–2015
- Labels: Piranha, Zamzama, Cannery Row, Jump up!
- Past members: LORD MOUSE, lead vocals THE KALYPSO KATZ: Tom Lee Who, tenor ukulele General Confusion, piano Benoît Ribot, electric guitar Francesco Tonial and Stéphane Doucerain, congas and percussion Mark Roman, double bass Antti Virtaranta, double bass Claudio Jolowicz, tenor saxophone Witold Niedziejko, alto saxophone Mateo Fauvet, spanish guitar Steven Moult, trumpet Roberto Viccio, trumpet Martin Pech, congas Luke Moller, violin, mandolin Nick Reddel, violin Dietmar Roth, contra bass Backing vocals: Jungle Jo, Vanillinda, Die Schicke Ulrike, Tiger Tam, Coca Cosi, Chiquita Anita
- Website: lordmouseandthekalypsokatz.com

Lord Mouse and the Kalypso Katz were a calypso band based in Berlin. Starting as an active band in 2008, their music was produced independently, with help from Cannery Row Records of Berlin, Jump Up! Records of Chicago, and Zamzama Productions of Paris. The second album, "Go Calypsonian" was released by the Piranha Musik label in Berlin.

== Biography ==
Lord Mouse and the Kalypso Katz was a Calypso band in the city of Berlin, and one of the few on the continent of Europe. It was formed to bring public awareness of the style to countries across Europe, but later gained a healthy following in Russia and Japan, as well. The musical style, originally from the island of Trinidad, began in earnest in the mid- 1920s, when it was first recorded, and grew in popularity in the United States in the 1950s through the work of Harry Belafonte. Since then, the genre has been all but forgotten in Europe. From the inception of the band the genre has become slowly recognized as a legitimate and dance-worthy musical form within the continent, spreading from Berlin outwards. Although the band was based in Berlin, the members came from all over the world, including the U.S., Russia, England, Australia, Brazil, Poland, France, Italy, Finland, and of course, Germany. The band stayed within the classic sound of the 1920s and 1930s as possible, while still utilizing modern recording techniques. While much of its work is original, there are also covers, used as a reference point, by such calypso heavyweights as Roaring Lion, Young Tiger, Caresser and Lord Invader.

With support from SOAS Radio London DJ Rita Ray of the band The Darts, as well as articles in France's major publication Libération, United States' N.P.R. Italian music critic Paolo Ferrari of Rumore, the BBC, major Berlin news outlets, etc. the band was able to forge a successful relationship with both the industry people and a wider audience. Since then, Lord Mouse and the Kalypso Katz have shared stages with performers including Joe Cocker, Bjork, Iggy Pop, Joan Baez, Patti Smith, Robert Plant, Ben Harper, Youssou N'Dour, Véronique Sanson, Herbie Hancock & Chick Corea and Rene LaCaille.

In 2013 their 2nd studio album Go Calypsonian was produced by Colin Bass of 3 Mustaphas 3 and Camel and reached #6 on the European World Music charts for July–August, floating on the top ten throughout the summer.

In January 2015 Lord Mouse (Keeley Brineman), band leader General Confusion (Boris Kontorowski), and Piranha Music, with support from Erica Smith and COSCAP invited many Soca stars from Barbados and St. Lucia for a cultural exchange in Berlin. Included were Red Plastic Bag, Charles D. Lewis, Wayne "Poonka" Willock, Anderson "Blood" Armstrong, Lennon "Blaze" Prospere and Nicholas Brancker. It was viewed by critics and fans as a general success, with hopes of creating a deeper tie between the West Indies and Europe. The above-mentioned stars returned again in the summer of 2016 to team up with The Kalypso Katz with even better reception, paving the way for stronger cultural ties between the West Indies and Europe.

Since then, their Christmas single "Calypso Christmas (Christmas in Trinidad)" has been released on CD and LP in Japan on a compilation of holiday songs. They have also starred in many TV programmes in Germany, including the children's TV show Loewen Zahn.

== Discography ==
- Self Titled (2009)

Cannery Row records Track Listing

- Rat Race Calypso
- Wash Your Hands
- Chicken Calypso
- Jack's Broth
- In the Jungle
- Calypso Be
- Don't Blame it on Elvis
- Fe Da Re
- Don't Judge me
- Kalypso Katz Calypso
- Boko's Mambo Calypso

- Also available on 10" vinyl records from Jump Up! Records [10" JUR] (2010)Jump Up!

=== Go Calypsonian ===
(2013) Piranha records Track Listing

- Monkey Bop
- Edward The VIII
- Chunga Changa
- White Boy Calypso
- Barefooted Lover
- Limbo Song
- Goombay Drum
- Calypso Hipshake
- Snake Charmer
- Sombrero
- Pussycat
- Dream Of A Jungle Cat

== See also ==
- Mighty Sparrow
- Roaring Lion
- Lord Kitchener
- Lord Invader
- Attila the Hun
