= Greenbay =

- Village
- Location within Antigua
- Coordinates: 17°07′02″N 61°50′53″W
- Country: Antigua and Barbuda
- Island: Antigua
- Civil parish: Saint John Parish

Population (2011)
  - Total: 684
- Time zone: UTC-4 (AST)

Greenbay is a village in Antigua in Saint John Parish, known especially as the birthplace of the calypsonian King Obstinate.

== Demographics ==
Greenbay has three enumeration districts.

- 11100 Green Bay School
- 11200 Green Bay Canal
- 10800 Green Bay Ext

=== Census data ===
Q49 Religion	Counts	%
Adventist	90	13.10%
Anglican	143	20.96%
Baptist	13	1.85%
Church of God	40	5.86%
Evangelical	31	4.47%
Jehovah Witness	2	0.31%
Methodist	17	2.47%
Moravian	63	9.24%
Nazarene	44	6.47%
None/no religion	45	6.63%
Pentecostal	79	11.56%
Rastafarian	16	2.31%
Roman Catholic	33	4.78%
Wesleyan Holiness	32	4.62%
Other	15	2.16%
Don't know/Not stated	22	3.24%
Total	684	100.00%

Q48 Ethnic	Counts	%
African descendent	618	90.29%
Hispanic	60	8.78%
Other	1	0.15%
Don't know/Not stated	5	0.77%
Total	684	100.00%

Q58. Country of birth	Counts	%
Antigua and Barbuda	497	72.73%
Other Caribbean countries	1	0.15%
Dominica	35	5.08%
Dominican Republic	61	8.94%
Guyana	17	2.47%
Jamaica	45	6.63%
Monsterrat	6	0.92%
St. Kitts and Nevis	1	0.15%
St. Lucia	12	1.69%
St. Vincent and the Grenadines	1	0.15%
Trinidad and Tobago	1	0.15%
USA	4	0.62%
USVI United States Virgin Islands	1	0.15%
Not Stated	1	0.15%
Total	684	100.00%

Q71 Country of Citizenship 1	Counts	%
Antigua and Barbuda	560	81.82%
Other Caribbean countries	1	0.15%
Dominica	17	2.47%
Dominican Republic	36	5.24%
Guyana	15	2.16%
Jamaica	41	6.01%
Monsterrat	2	0.31%
St. Lucia	9	1.39%
USA	2	0.31%
Not Stated	1	0.15%
Total	684	100.00%

Q71 Country of Citizenship 2 (Country of Second Citizenship)	Counts	%
Other Caribbean countries	3	4.35%
Dominica	17	23.19%
Dominican Republic	26	36.23%
Guyana	2	2.90%
Jamaica	5	7.25%
Monsterrat	5	7.25%
St. Lucia	2	2.90%
St. Vincent and the Grenadines	1	1.45%
Trinidad and Tobago	2	2.90%
USA	7	10.14%
Other countries	1	1.45%
Total	73	100.00%
NotApp :	611	
