= Kaiso =

Type of music, particularly popular in Caribbean nations

- Stylistic origins: Traditional music of the Kongo, Ibibio and Efik peoples; other West African music
- Cultural origins: Akwa Akpa and Kingdom of Kongo
- Derivative forms: Calypso; soca; brukdown; palm-wine music

Fusion genres
- Chutney; chut-kai-pang; rapso; gospelypso; cadence-lypso; ska; spouge; reggae

Kaiso is a type of music popular in Trinidad and Tobago, and other countries, especially of the Caribbean, such as Grenada, Belize, Barbados, St. Lucia, and Dominica, which originated in West Africa particularly among the Efik and Ibibio people of Nigeria, and later evolved into calypso music.

Kaiso music has its origins in West Africa (particularly in present-day Nigeria) and in the Kingdom of Kongo and was brought over by the enslaved Africans, who (in the early history of the art form) used it to sing about their masters. The people would also gather in "kaiso" tents where a griot or lead singer would lead them in song. Many early kaisos were sung in French Creole by an individual called a chantwell. Kaiso songs are generally narrative in form and often have a cleverly concealed political subtext. Kaiso performers are known as kaisonians.

In Barbados, kaiso refers to a form of stage-presented calypso, such as at the crop over festival.

== Terminology ==
In the Igbo language ka anyị sonye means "Let's join". The word is often used synonymously with calypso today, but often with the connotation that the former is more authentic, showing approval consistent with its original meaning. This word can also be found in an Igbo name. Kaisoluchukwu (Solu, Kaiso). Kaisoluchukwu means "Let's respect/follow God" in the Igbo language.

== History ==
=== Ibibio and Igbo influence on the etymology ===
The Ibibio people/Igbo people and the origins of limbo and calypso. The enslaved Ibibios, Igbo and supposedly other slaves would gather, plant two poles on opposite ends, and place a bar across. They would take turns (individually) dancing and negotiating their bodies to go underneath the bar and exit on the opposite end without upsetting it, no matter how low the bar was. The accompanying chant used to egg on and lead the dancer to a successful exit went something like this: "kaiso, kaiso, kaiso" —– meaning "go forward, go ahead, more". The dance was later named limbo. Ka means go. Iso means forward. Kaiso therefore, means go forward in the Ibibio language of Southeastern Nigeria. The Ibibios and Igbo people who were kidnapped from the Niger Delta and Calabar, shipped across the vast Atlantic Ocean, and subsequently enslaved in the Caribbean islands of Trinidad and Tobago brought their music, language, and traditions with them. In slavery, their customs and traditions got interwoven into the larger slave culture of the area, but the word kaiso (go forward, go ahead, or more) survived. It later became the name of Trinidad and Tobago's most popular music. Kaiso evolved into calypso and that, too, evolved into soca music. The very fact that the word kaiso was common and accepted enough to be used for naming a dance or song suggests that the Ibibio and Igbo slave population of that area was strong and socially influential.

=== Calypso music ===
Calypso music was developed in Trinidad in the 17th century from the West African Kaiso and canboulay music brought by captive Africans imported to that Caribbean island to work on sugar plantations. These slaves, brought to toil on sugar plantations, were stripped of all connections to their homeland and family and not allowed to talk to each other. They used calypso to mock the slave masters and to communicate with each other. Many early calypsos were sung in French Creole by an individual called a griot. "Patois" or Trinidadian French Creole was the original language of the calypso music.

=== Kongo influence ===
That Kalinda and its accompanying drum rhythms were predominantly a Kongo input into Trinidad culture can be concluded from the significant number of Kongo names among remembered stickmen and popular stickyards and from the emotional involvement with stickfight culture of Kongo descendants interviewed in the 1970s in contrast with the attachment of Yoruba, Rada and Hausa descendants to religious ceremonies. The kalinda drum rhythm was transported almost bodily into Kaiso even without modification. This rhythm can also be heard in Calypso and Soca.

== Sources ==
- Warner-Lewis, Maureen (1991). Guinea's Other Suns: The African Dynamic in Trinidad Culture. Majority Press. ISBN 0-912469-27-7.
- Millington, J. (1999). Barbados - Garland Encyclopedia of World Music. Vol. 2. Routledge. pp. 813–821. ISBN 0-8153-1865-0.
