= Draytons Two =

The Draytons Two
- Origin: Barbados
- Genres: Spouge
- Years active: 1970s
- Label: WIRL

The Draytons Two were a popular Barbadian spouge band of the 1970s known for their own and unique style of syncretic spouge, the raw spouge. Raw Spouge is also the title of their first studio album published through the Jamaican record label WIRL in 1973.

== Discography ==
=== Studio albums ===
- Raw Spouge (WIRL; 1973)

=== Singles ===
- "G.O. Go" (WIRL; 1973)
- "Brother to Brother" / "River Come Down" (WIRL, 1978)

=== Appearances ===
- Various artists – Original Reggae Sound (Warner Bros. Records; 1976)
- Various artists – Reggae Fever (WEA; 1979)
- Various artists – Super Reggae I (WEA, 1979)
- Various artists – Vintage Spouge: Nostalgic Hits Vol. 1 (Caribbean Records; 2002)
