= Cariso =

Music genre

As early as the 1780s, the word kaiso was used to describe a French creole song and, in Trinidad, kaiso seems to have been perfected by the chantwells (singers, mostly female) during the first half of the 19th century. The chantwells, assisted by alternating in call-and-response style with a chorus, were a central component of the practice called Calinda (stick-fighting).

Calinda was a central component of early carnival celebrations in Trinidad, and after emancipation (1834), Afro-Creoles essentially took over the streets during carnival. Elite French Creole revellers, for their part, moved their carnival celebrations indoors and to private parties. Kaiso used satirical and insulting lyrics, and is related to the picong tradition. Kaiso singers, called chantwells, sang primarily in French creole.

== Chantwells ==
The "chantwell" is another incarnation of the African "griot" tradition. On the Caribbean plantations African griots became chantwells, preserving the tribe’s history and traditions orally. They would sing to contemporary and mythical heroes and to the Gods. They would also preserve the complex oral traditions of West Africa with songs of derision, praise, satire, and lament. At first the chantwells were mostly women because the males were targeted for destruction on the plantation. On Emancipation the tradition continued and the chantwells would sing call-and-response chants called lavways lionizing and cheering on champion stickfighters. This form of music gradually evolved into the modern calypso.

Calypso music was developed in Trinidad in the 17th century from the West African Kaiso and canboulay music brought by African slaves imported to that Caribbean island to work on sugar plantations. These enslaved Africans were stripped of all connections to their homeland and family and not allowed to talk to each other. They used calypso to mock the slave masters and to communicate with each other.

As calypso developed, the role of the griot (originally a similar travelling musician in West Africa) became known as a chantwell and, eventually, calypsonian. As the country became urbanized chantwells became more and more a male function but the portfolio remains the same. The chantwell is the Call, the tribe and the audience is the Response.

== Rapso music in the cariso tradition ==
Rapso music is itself an evolution of the chantwell or griot tradition of African music in the diaspora. It is called, "the poetry of Calypso," and "the Power of the Word in the rhythm of the Word." Rapso is the poetic 'rap' form of Trinbagonian music, but has its origins in the oral elements of the performances of traditional masquerade characters in Trinidad Carnival.

Traditional masquerade characters, such as the Midnight Robber, Pierrot Grenade, and the Wild Indians, each have particular forms of poetic and musical speeches that echo ancient African masking and poetic traditions. Rapso borrowed many of the rhythmic and performance elements of these forms.

The first wave of Rapso music occurred in the late 1960s with the invention of Rapso by its pioneer Lancelot Kebu Layne. The second wave occurred in the late 1970s and mushroomed in the early '80s with the work of Brother Resistance and the Network Rhythm Band, alongside other artists such as Brother Cetewayo and Brother Book. This wave mainstreamed Rapso music in Trinidad and Tobago and World Music.

The third wave of Rapso occurred with the advent of young groups including Kindred and Homefront in the early 1990s. They were part of a musical movement entitled the 'Kiskadee Karavan' that was led by millionaire Robert Amar, who invested his money in the unleashing of the young musical genius of Trinidad and Tobago. The Karavan revolutionised Trinidad’s music by taking 'traditional' forms such as the Rapso and giving it modern production and promotional methods to take the music to stadiums in the native Trinidad and Tobago. This opportunity uncovered many talents on the ground, and created a series of anthemic musical singles. The song 'This Trini Could Flow' by Kindred took Rapso into the 21st century and firmly entrenched the music as a form comparable to hip-hop and dancehall.

== See also ==
- Calypsonian
