= Subways (song) =

Single by the Avalanches

from the album Wildflower
- Released: 22 June 2016
- Recorded: Sing Sing Studios (Melbourne, Victoria)
- Genre: Plunderphonics; disco; funk
- Length: 3:10
- Label: Modular
- Songwriters: Steven Alexander; Robbie Chater; Tony Di Blasi; Eugene Diserio; Barry Gibb; Maurice Gibb; Robin Gibb; Chandra Oppenheim; Patrick Simmons
- Producer: The Avalanches

The Avalanches singles chronology
"Colours" (2016)	"Subways" (2016)	"We Will Always Love You" (2020)

"Subways" is a song by Australian electronic music group the Avalanches. The song was released as the third single from their second studio album, Wildflower (2016), on 22 June 2016. The song rose to number 81 on the Australian ARIA Charts.

== Background ==
"Subways" was first premiered live on 3 June 2016 during the Avalanches' performance at the Primavera Sound festival in Barcelona. It was supposed to be the group's first live-band show since 2007, but their plans were forced to change last minute to a DJ set because of what member James Dela Cruz described as "visa fuckups".

The studio version was released on 22 June as the album's third single.

== Composition ==
"Subways" has been described as a disco-funk song. Like the other tracks on Wildflower, it is a mainly sample-based track, which samples "Warm Ride" by the Bee Gees, performed by Graham Bonnet, as well as "Black Water" by Patrick Simmons. The main vocals of the song are pulled from a 1980 song titled "Subways" by Chandra Oppenheim, who was 12 years old at the time of its release. She had not previously heard about the Avalanches until they approached her regarding the sample. Featuring strings throughout, the song had been compared to the group's previous work by Spin and described as featuring a "grooving bassline" and "richly-textured sonic layers" by Rolling Stone.

== Track listing ==
Digital download
No.	Title	Length
1.	"Subways"	3:10

== Charts ==
Chart (2016)	Peak position
Australia (ARIA)	81

== Certifications ==
Region	Certification	Certified units/sales
Australia (ARIA)	Gold	35,000^{‡}
^{‡} Sales+streaming figures based on certification alone.
