= A.Dd+ =

American rapper

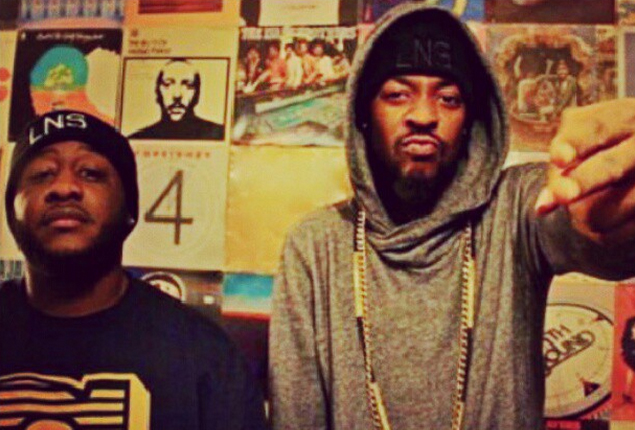
- Paris P and Slim Gravy of A.Dd+

Background information
- Origin: Dallas, Texas, U.S.
- Genres: Hip hop, Southern hip hop
- Years active: 2009–2016
- Past members: Slim Gravy; Paris P
- Website: Official Site

A.Dd+ was an American hip hop duo from Dallas formed by Dionte "Slim Gravy" Rembert and Arrias "Paris Pershun" Walls. Having released their first album in 2011, they were named "Best Hip-Hop Act" for two straight years by the Dallas Observer Music Awards. They went on three major tours: the Red Bull Texas Skooled Tour, the Black Milk Claps & Slaps Tour and the Talib Kweli Prisoner of Conscious Tour. The group broke up in January 2016.

== Discography ==
- Power Of The Tongue (2009)
- When Pigs Fly (2011)
- DiveHiFlyLo (2012)
- DiveHiFlyLo: Every Man Is King (2013)
- NAWF EP (2014)
- NAWF AMERICA (2016)
