= Chandra (band) =

American post-punk band

- Origin: New York City, U.S.
- Genres: Post-punk; Funk; No wave
- Years active: 1979–1982
- Labels: GO GO Records; Telephone Explosion
- Past members: Chandra Oppenheim; Eugenie Diserio; Steven Alexander; Fred Maher
- Website: Official Site

Chandra was an American post-punk band founded in 1979. The band was fronted by Chandra Oppenheim, who was 11 years old when the band was founded. A second incarnation of the band, The Chandra Dimension, was launched in 1981 but dissolved before a second EP could be released.

== History ==
Eugenie Diserio and Steven Alexander were former members of the band Model Citizens and contemporaries of Chandra Oppenheim's father, conceptual artist Dennis Oppenheim. After seeing the 11-year-old Oppenheim perform, Diserio and Alexander decided to build a music group around her. In 1979, they began rehearsing in a rented room at the Music Building in Hell’s Kitchen, with Fred Maher joining as drummer. The band debuted at the Mudd Club in New York City.

Chandra released their first and only EP, Transportation, in 1980. A second incarnation of the band, the Chandra Dimension, was launched in 1981, and included three additional musicians between 12 and 19 years old. The band performed on the children's television series Captain Kangaroo. However, the Chandra Dimension dissolved in 1982 before a second EP could be released. “I had to make a decision, school or music, and I chose school,” said Oppenheim in 2018.

Chandra received renewed interest in 2016, after their track "Subways" was sampled by the Avalanches in their song of the same name. Oppenheim had not previously heard about the Avalanches until they approached her regarding the sample but subsequently became a fan. That same year, she performed live with the Avalanches in New York City. In 2018, the label Telephone Explosion released a compilation album, Transportation EPs, which combined the 1980 EP with the unreleased second EP and two four-track demos.

== Discography ==
=== EPs ===
Year	Details
1980	Transportation: Released: 1980; Label: GO GO Records

=== Compilations ===
Year	Details
2018	Transportation EPs: Released: 2018; Label: Telephone Explosion
