= Neville Marcano =

Trinidadian calypsonian

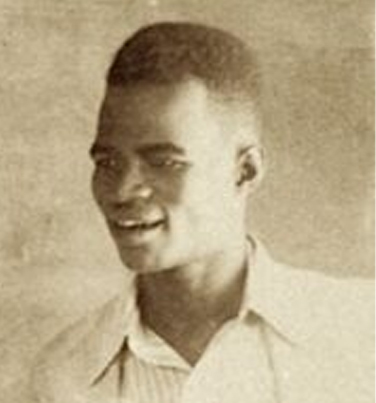
Growling Tiger ca. 1936

Neville Marcano (1916–13 May 1993), known as the Growling Tiger, was a Trinidadian calypsonian.

== Biography ==
Born in Diego Martin, Trinidad, Tiger was originally a boxer who won the Trinidad flyweight championship in 1929. He was active in calypso from his teens and began singing professionally in 1934. He was a member of the old brigade of calypso singers, which included Lord Beginner, Attila The Hun, the Roaring Lion, and Lord Pretender. In 1935, he went to New York with Attila and Lord Beginner to record for the Decca label, recording 46 songs in total. In 1939, he won the first Calypso King competition with "Trade Union".

More so than his contemporaries Tiger sang about social and political issues. His best known songs are "Money is King", about economic inequality, and "The Gold in Africa", about the Italian invasion of Ethiopia. Recording together with Atilla and Beginner as the Keskidee Trio, he recorded some lighter tunes, including "Don't Let Me Mother Know".

Folklorist Alan Lomax recorded him in 1962. In 1966, Growling Tiger performed at the Newport Folk Festival. In 1979, he recorded an album, Knockdown Calypsos, for Rounder Records.

Fellow Trinidadian George Browne was dubbed "Young Tiger" after recording a cover version of Marcano's song "Single Man" in 1953.
