= Lord Beginner =

Trinidadian calypsonian (1904–1981)

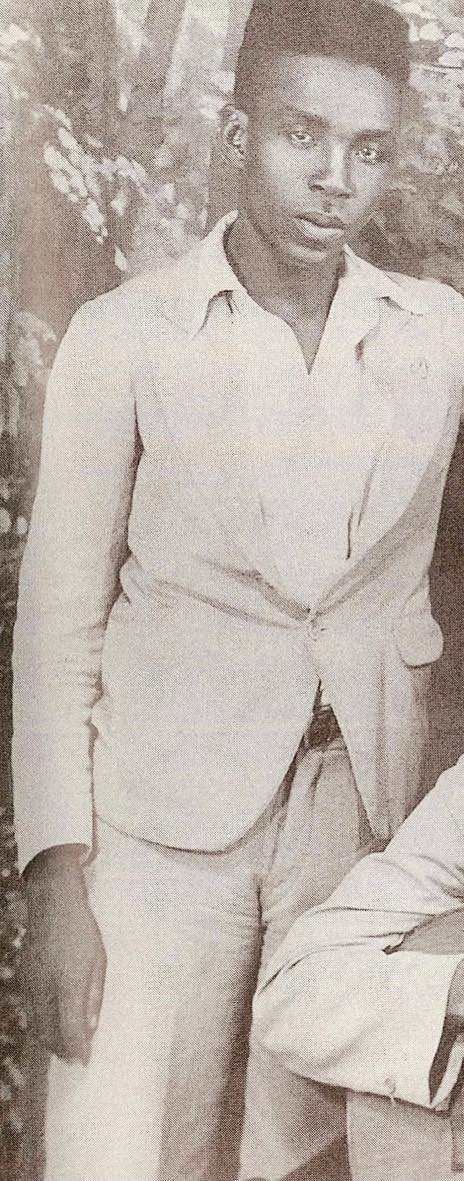
Beginner ca. 1938-1940

Egbert Moore (27 June 1904 – 1981), known as Lord Beginner, was a popular calypsonian.

== Biography ==
Moore was born in Port-of-Spain in Trinidad. According to AllMusic: "After attracting attention with his soulful singing in Trinidad and Tobago, Lord Beginner was sent by expatriate Portuguese businessman Edward Sa Gomes to New York City, along with Attila The Hun and Growling Tiger, to record for the Port-Of-Spain label in May 1934." These recordings by Moore with other leading members of Trinidad's "Old Brigade" of calypsonians helped to spark a renaissance of the calypso genre in the 1940s and '50s, and introduce the music to the world.

In July 1948, Lord Beginner emigrated to England with fellow calypsonians Lord Kitchener (Aldwyn Roberts) and Lord Woodbine (Harold Philips). They arrived near London on the Empire Windrush, the first of many voyages conveying West Indians wishing to start a new life in Britain. Beginner began playing clubs throughout London and was a success, recording for the Parlophone label in 1950.

== Calypso songs ==
Lord Beginner signed a recording contract with Parlophone in 1950. Two of his more well known calypsos were "Victory Test Match" (including the lyrics "Cricket, lovely cricket, at Lord's where I saw it") and "General Election". The first was reputedly devised on the spot following the West Indies cricket team's victory against England at Lord's in 1950, inspiring Beginner and Lord Kitchener to begin a musical march from the ground to Piccadilly followed by dancing spectators. "General Election" was inspired by Clement Attlee's victory in the 1950 British general election.
