= Julian Whiterose =

- Also known as: J. White Rose, Julian White Rose, J. Resigna
- Born: Henry Julian; 1800s Trinidad
- Genres: Calypso
- Occupations: Musician, songwriter
- Instrument: Vocals
- Years active: 1900–ca. 1930
- Label: Victor

Henry Julian, better known by his stage name Julian Whiterose, was a pioneering calypso performing and recording artist. Other names he was known to perform under include: J. White Rose, Julian White Rose, J. Resigna, and, his real name, Henry Julian.

While early calypso performers sang in French, Whiterose is credited with the growth of the English language calypso. During Whiterose's career the musical style was called cariso or chantwell (derived from "chantuelle"; the term "calypso," which evolved from cariso, was coined later). Whiterose was one of the first chantwell musicians whose works were recorded, and the first vocalist to record.

== The 1914 Victor recordings ==
Iron Duke in the Land

In 1914 the United States-based Victor label sent engineers to Trinidad to record the repertoire of the local music scene, including the emerging calypso form. Two artists were recorded. One was Jules Sims, a stick fighter who recorded a Kalenda song in French Creole. The other was Whiterose, who under the name "J. Resigna" recorded five songs on September 11 and 12, 1914. At least one of these songs (and possibly others), "Iron Duke in the Land", was sung in English. This title is the only existing recording of Whiterose (the others are lost). It was included on the 1989 Rounder Records CD compilation Calypso Pioneers 1912-1937. According to session logs compiled by Victor engineers, the accompanying guitarist on the "Resigna" recordings was Gerald Clark. Clark went on to a lengthy career (into the 1940s) as an orchestra leader in New York accompanying some of the most popular calypso vocalists and recording artists.

== The White Rose Masquerade Band ==
According to John Cowley in his book Carnival, Canboulay and Calypso: Traditions in the Making, Whiterose's real name was Henry Julian, and he led a group called White Rose Masquerade Band. Cowley states newspaper reports about him appeared as far back as 1900. A reporter for The Mirror newspaper had attended one of the Julian band's practice sessions and wrote, “Judging by the manner in which they are trained and conducted by their leader Mr. Henry Julian, one should predict for them great success.” The same article described Julian as “a singer of the most intellectual songs”.

== Whiterose's known recordings ==
Cowley says that though Julian made a series of recordings for Victor, most titles were unknown because the Victor engineers did not write down song titles. Instead, said Cowley, “Only descriptions of the kinds of music were printed on record labels or in company catalogues. They were described as 'Single Tone Calipsos (sic)' and 'Double Tone Calipsos' performed by J. Resigna, one of Julian’s sobriquets." However, Cowley discovered song titles and Victor catalog numbers in contemporary newspapers, and determined that the single-tone recordings were “Belle Marie Coolie” ("Beautiful Marie, the East Indian") (Victor 67035), “Hooray Jubal Jay” (Victor 67375), “Iron Duke In the Land” (Victor 67362), and “Ringing A Bell” (the B side of Victor 67035), while the double-tone was “Bayonet Charge by the Laws of Iron Duke” (Victor 67387). In “Iron Duke in the Land” (which Cowley calls "a song of self-praise"), Julian recounts the positions he held in the White Rose band before he became its leader with the title "Lord of Resigna, the Iron Duke". A review of "Ringing a Bell" in The Mirror indicates the song was composed in Creole and that it was about Carúpano rum.

== Sources ==
- Julian Whiterose Victor Records discography at University of Southern California, Santa Barbara
