= King Radio =

Trinidadian calypso musician

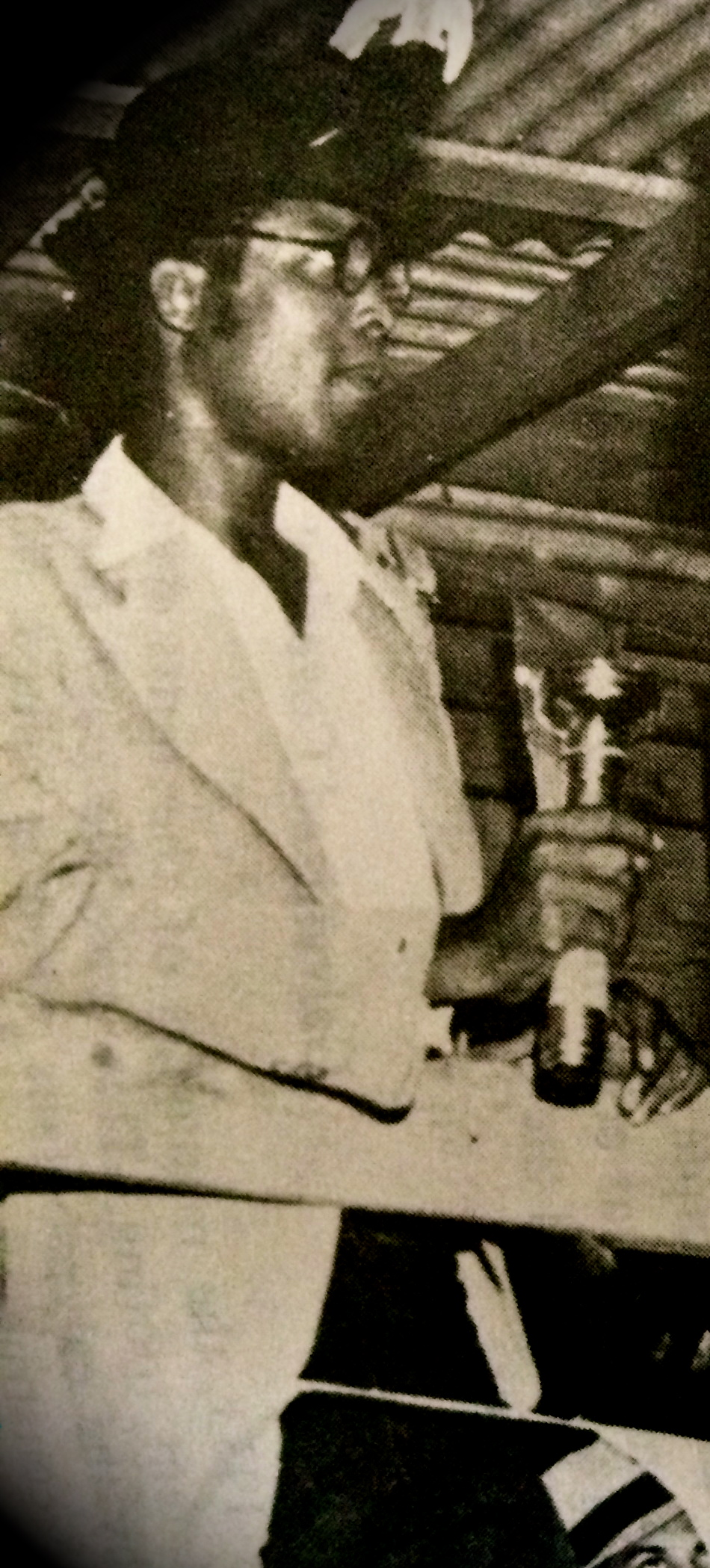
King Radio ca. 1937

Norman Span, known as King Radio, was a top Trinidadian calypsonian active in the 1930s and 1940s.

He was a waterfront worker in Port of Spain when he started performing in public in 1929. Six years later he started his short-lived recording career. He was the composer of many calypsos, several of which later became standards through popular recordings by Harry Belafonte such as "Matilda", "Man Smart, Woman Smarter", and "Brown Skin Girl".
