= Picong =

Light comical banter

Picong or Piquant is light comical banter, usually at someone else's expense. It is the way in which West Indians (particularly those in the Eastern Caribbean) tease, heckle and mock each other in a friendly manner. However, the line between humour and insult is fine and constantly shifting, and at times the convivial spirit may degenerate into more heated debate and perhaps, physical altercations. The ability to engage in picong without crossing over into insult is highly valued in the culture of calypso music.

Playwright Steve Carter, who wrote an award-winning play of the same name, describes pecong as a "verbal battle of insults hurled in rhymed verse."

== See also ==
- Avoidance speech (mother-in-law languages)
- Call and response
- Diss track
- The dozens
- Extempo
- Mother insult
- Roast (comedy)
- My Wife and Kids
