= Wilmoth Houdini =

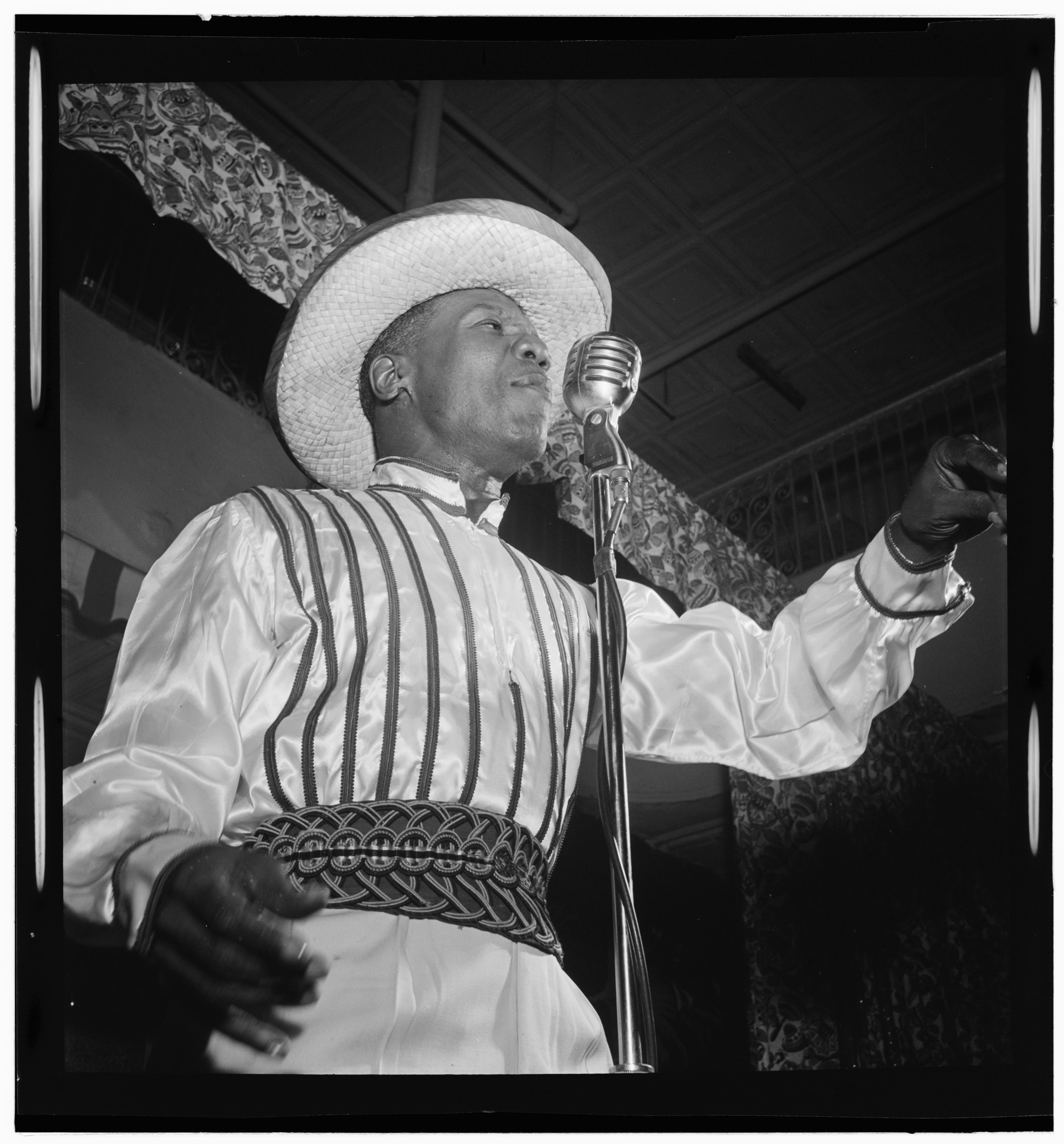
- Performing in the 1940s

Background information
- Born: Frederick Wilmoth Hendricks; November 25, 1895; Port of Spain, Trinidad and Tobago
- Died: August 6, 1973 (aged 77) New York City, U.S.
- Occupation: singer-songwriter
- Instrument: vocals

Frederick Wilmoth Hendricks (November 25, 1895 – August 6, 1973), best known as Wilmoth Houdini, was a prominent calypsonian.

== Life ==
In 1916, he started his career in earnest when he began working with the African Millionaires, a large carnival group consisting of about 25 members. He arrived in New York City sometime around 1927, after working on cargo ships and travelling extensively. Not long after his arrival there, he began cutting records with local bands for Decca Records, notably Gerald Clark's Night Owls. He released well over a hundred different 78s between 1928 and 1940, also under the names of Fredrick Wilmoth Hendricks (his given name), Edgar Leon Sinclair (the name on his US passport), and King Houdini. His 1939 composition "He Had It Coming" was a hit for Louis Jordan and Ella Fitzgerald under the new title "Stone Cold Dead in the Market". The song stayed on the top of the R&B chart for five weeks, and reached no. 7 on the pop chart. Gaining a good deal of recognition, Houdini wasted no time in organizing high-profile calypso festivals and concerts around New York, quickly becoming a respected member of the Caribbean communities there.

After moving to New York (as one of the earliest Trinidadian émigrés), he was often the object of derision by the calypsonians still in Trinidad, who claimed that he was stealing their ideas and capitalizing on them in the US. This can be seen in numerous calypsos of the early to mid-1930s, from Roaring Lion and Attila the Hun in particular, who also recorded in New York at the time. This led to Houdini's 1934 rebuttal, "War Declaration". Towards the beginning of the 1950s he played regularly at the Caribbean Club on Seventh Avenue, New York, with his only real rival, The Duke of Iron, also a native of Trinidad.

Houdini died on August 6, 1973, in New York City, where he had lived for most his life. He is buried in Woodlawn Cemetery in the Bronx, New York City.

== Influence ==
His song "Uncle Joe", although melodically not original, had a huge influence upon the American psyche, influencing Dizzy Gillespie, Ella Fitzgerald, Lord Mouse and the Kalypso Katz, Hazmat Modine, Bob Brozman, and C. W. Stoneking, to name but a few. He has inspired a newer generation of artists around the world, for example with his recording "Black But Sweet" covered by Mighty Dub Katz ("Son of Wilmot"), Sabres of Paradise ("Wilmot"), Shantel ("Bucovina") and Eleftheria Arvanitaki ("Δεν μιλώ για μια νύχτα, εγώ"). The Avalanches sampled Houdini's "Bobby Sox Idol" heavily in the 2016 single "Frankie Sinatra".
