= Calypso music =

Style of music that originated in Trinidad and Tobago

Calypso
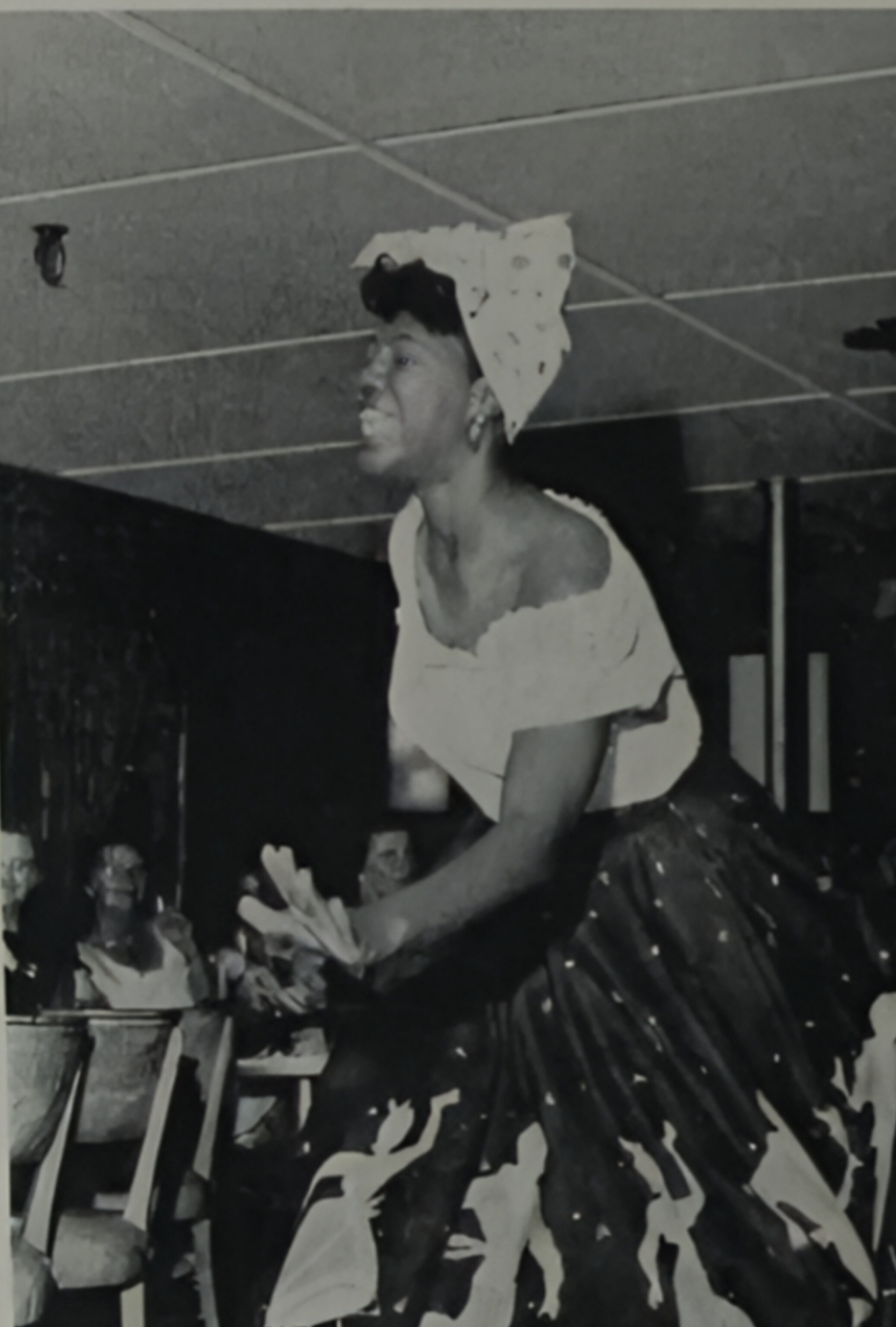
- Singer Calypso Mama, real name Maureen Verlene Duvalier, on stage
- Stylistic origins: Kaiso; Canboulay
- Cultural origins: Early 19th century, Trinidad and Tobago
- Typical instruments: Trumpet; trombone; saxophone; guitar; double bass; congas; maraca; piano
- Derivative forms: Soca

Subgenres
- Extempo; benna

Fusion genres
- Chutney; chutney soca; rapso; gospelypso; cadence-lypso; spouge; mento-calypso; ragga-soca; ragga-calypso

Other topics
- Caribbean Carnival; calypsonians; list of Caribbean music genres; calypso tents; picong; Shango; Obeah; calypso de El Callao

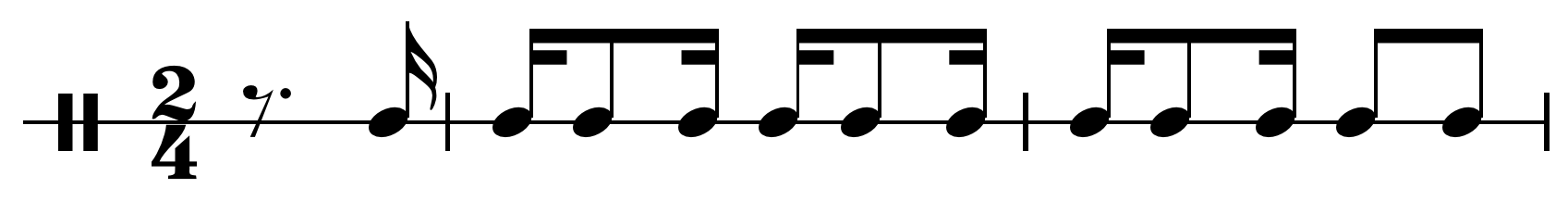
Calypso rhythm

Calypso is a style of music that originated in Trinidad and Tobago from Afro-Trinidadians during the early- to mid-19th century and spread to the rest of the Caribbean Antilles by the mid-20th century. Its rhythms can be traced back to West African Kaiso and the arrival of French planters and their slaves from the French Antilles in the 18th century.

It is characterized by highly rhythmic and harmonic vocals, and was historically most often sung in a French creole and led by a griot. As calypso developed, the role of the griot became known as a chantuelle and eventually, calypsonian. As English replaced "patois" (Antillean) as the dominant language, calypso migrated into English, and in so doing it attracted more attention from the government. It allowed the masses to challenge the actions of the unelected Governor and Legislative Council, and the elected town councils of Port of Spain and San Fernando. Calypso continued to play an important role in political expression.

Calypso in the Caribbean includes a range of genres, including benna in Antigua and Barbuda; spouge, a style of Barbadian popular music; Dominica cadence-lypso, which mixed calypso with the cadence of Haiti; and soca music, a style of kaiso/calypso, with influences from chutney, soul, funk, Latin and cadence-lypso.

== Etymology ==
It is thought that the name "calypso" was originally "kaiso" which is now believed to come from Efik "ka isu" ("go on!") and Ibibio "kaa iso" ("continue, go on"), used in urging someone on or in backing a contestant. There is also a Trinidadian term "cariso" that means "old-time" calypsos. The term "calypso" is recorded from the 1930s onwards. Alternatively, the insert for The Rough Guide to Calypso and Soca (published by World Music Network) favours John Cowley's arguments in Carnival, Canboulay and Calypso: Traditions in the Making, that the word might be a corruption of the French carrouseaux and through the process of patois and Anglicization became caliso and then finally "calypso"; however, Cowley also notes that the first mention of the word "calypso" is given in a description of a dance in 1882 by Abbé Masse.

== History of calypso ==
Calypso music has its roots in Trinidad in the 17th century from the West African Kaiso and Canboulay familiar to the enslaved Africans brought to the Caribbean islands to work on sugar plantations. The Africans brought to toil on sugar plantations were stripped of all connections to their homeland and family and their communication opportunities were limited. They used calypso to mock the slave masters and to communicate with each other. Many early calypsos were sung in French Creole by an individual called a griot. As calypso developed, the role of the griot became known as a chantuelle and eventually, calypsonian.

Modern calypso, however, began in the 19th century as a fusion of disparate elements ranging from the masquerade song lavway, French Creole belair and the calinda stick-fighting chantwell. Also early in its recording years were influences from Venezuelan paseos. Calypso's early rise was closely connected with the adoption of Carnival by Trinidadian slaves, including canboulay drumming and the music masquerade processions. The French brought Carnival to Trinidad, and calypso competitions at Carnival grew in popularity, especially after the abolition of slavery in 1834.

== Recordings ==
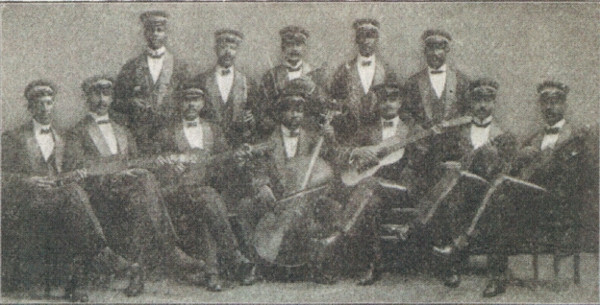
Lovey's String Band (pre-1925)

The first identifiably calypso genre song was recorded in 1912, by Lovey's String Band while visiting New York City. In 1914, the second calypso recordings—including the first sung in English—were done by chantwell Julian Whiterose, better known as the Iron Duke and famous calinda stick-fighter. Jules Sims would also record vocal calypsos. The majority of these calypsos of the World War I era were instrumentals by Lovey and Lionel Belasco. Perhaps due to the constraints of the wartime economy, no recordings of note were produced until the late 1920s and early 1930s, when the "golden era" of calypso would cement the style, form, and phrasing of the music.

Calypso evolved into a way of spreading news around Trinidad. Politicians, journalists and public figures often debated the content of each song, and many islanders considered these songs the most reliable news source. Calypsonians pushed the boundaries of free speech as their lyrics spread news of any topic relevant to island life, including speaking out against political corruption.

Even with this censorship, calypsos continued to push boundaries, with a variety of ways to slip songs past the scrutinizing eyes of the editor. Double entendre, or double-speak, was one way, as was the practice of denouncing countries such as Germany and its annexation of Poland, while making pointed references toward the colonial government's policies in Trinidad. Sex, scandal, gossip, politics, local news, and insulting other calypsonians were the order of the day in classic calypso, just as it is today with classic hip-hop. And just as the hip-hop of today, the music sparked shock and outrage in moralistic sections of society.

Countless recordings were dumped at sea in the name of censorship, although in truth, rival US companies did this in the spirit of underhanded competition, claiming that the rivals' material was unfit for US consumption. Decca Records lost untold pressings in this manner, as did its rival, RCA's Bluebird label.

An entrepreneur named Eduardo de Sá Gomes played a significant role in spreading calypso in its early days. Sá Gomes, a Portuguese immigrant who owned a local music and phonograph equipment shop in Port of Spain, promoted the genre and gave financial support to the local artists. In March 1934, he sent Roaring Lion and Attila the Hun to New York City to record; they became the first calypsonians to record abroad, bringing the genre out of the West Indies and into pop culture. Lord Invader was quick to follow, and stayed in New York City after a protracted legal case involving the theft of his song "Rum and Coca-Cola", a hit by the Andrews Sisters. He made his home there along with Wilmoth Houdini, and became one of the great calypsonians of the US.

Early forms of calypso were also similar to jazz (which came after) such as Sans Humanitae. In this extempo (extemporaneous) melody calypsonians lyricise impromptu, commenting socially or insulting each other, "sans humanité" or "no mercy" (which is again a reference to French influence).

== Selected recordings ==
- Deliso (Atilla The Hun, 1938)
- Suzi-Qu (Roaring Lion, 1940)
- My Intention Is War (Lord Invader, 1946)
- Bei Mir Bist Du Schoen (The Duke of Iron, 1950)
- General Election (Lord Beginner, 1950)
- Court House Scandal (Calypso Mama, 1957)

== Popularity ==
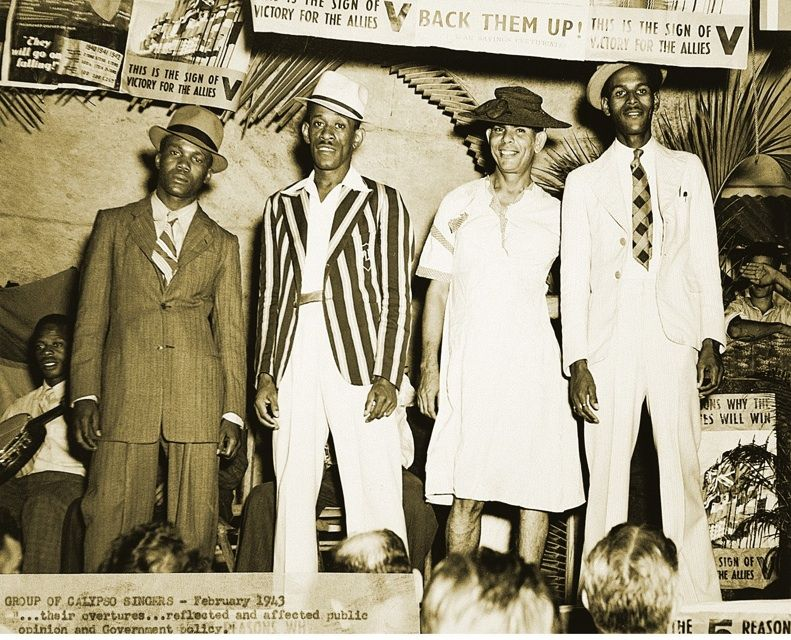
Lord Invader, Mighty Growler, Atilla the Hun and Roaring Lion (1943)

The first major stars of calypso started crossing over to new audiences worldwide in the late 1930s. Attila the Hun, Roaring Lion and Lord Invader were first, followed by Lord Kitchener, one of the longest-lasting calypso stars in history—he continued to release hit records until his death in 2000. 1944's "Rum and Coca-Cola" by the Andrews Sisters, a cover version of a Lord Invader song, became an American hit despite the song being a very critical commentary on the explosion of prostitution, inflation and other negative influences accompanying the American military bases in Trinidad at the time. Perhaps the most straightforward way to describe the focus of calypso is that it articulated itself as a form of protest against the authoritarian colonial culture which existed at the time.

External audio
- You may hear arrangements of Calypso music by Leonard De Paur on the album Calypso Christmas performed with the De Paur Chorus in 1956 Here on archive.org

In 1956 Mighty Sparrow won Trinida's Music contest. Calypso, especially a toned-down, commercial variant, became a worldwide craze with pop song "Banana Boat Song", or "Day-O", a traditional Jamaican folk song, was recorded by pop singer Harry Belafonte on his album Calypso (1956). Calypso was the first calypso record to sell more than a million copies. 1956 also saw the massive international hit "Jean and Dinah" by Mighty Sparrow. This song too was a sly commentary as a "plan of action" for the calypsonian on the widespread prostitution and the prostitutes' desperation after the closing of the U.S. naval base on Trinidad at Chaguaramas. In addition, the choral director Leonard De Paur recorded a calypso album in 1956 for Columbia Records featuring his choral arrangements of traditional Christmas music from Trinidad and Barbados, as well as the song Mary's Little Boy Child by Jester Hairston (Calypso Christmas, CL 923 Mono LP, 1956).

In the Broadway-theatre musical Jamaica (1957), Harold Arlen and Yip Harburg cleverly parodied "commercial" Belafonte-style calypso. Several films jumped on the calypso craze in 1957 such as Island in the Sun (20th Century Fox) that featured Belafonte and the low-budget films Calypso Joe (Allied Artists), Calypso Heat Wave (Columbia Pictures), and Bop Girl Goes Calypso (United Artists). Robert Mitchum released an album, Calypso...Is Like So (1957), on Capitol Records, capturing the sound, spirit, and subtleties of the genre. Dizzy Gillespie recorded a calypso album Jambo Caribe (1964) with James Moody and Kenny Barron.

Soul shouter Gary "US" Bonds released a calypso album Twist up Calypso (1962) on Legrand records, shortly after returning home from his military post in Port of Spain. Nithi Kanagaratnam from Sri Lanka sang calypso-styled songs in Tamil in 1968, which was a success and earned him the title "Father of Tamil Popular Music". Since Baila rhythm was popular in Sri Lanka, most of his songs were classified as Tamil Baila.

In the mid-1970s, women entered the calypso men's-oriented arena. Calypso Rose was the first woman to win the Trinidad Road March competition in 1977 with her song "Gimme More Tempo". The following year with "Come Leh We Jam", she won the "Calypso King " competition, the first time a woman had received the award. The competition's title was changed to Calypso Monarch in her honor. The French and pioneer electronic musician Jean Michel Jarre released an album in 1990 called Waiting for Cousteau. The album has four tracks: "Calypso", "Calypso part 2", "Calypso part 3 Fin de Siècle" and "Waiting for Cousteau". It was dedicated to Jacques-Yves Cousteau on his 80th birthday. This album had a special participation of the Amocco Renegades (a traditional steel-drum band from Trinidad and Tobago). In the first track is possible to notice a strong style influence. Calypso had another short burst of commercial interest when Tim Burton's horror/comedy film Beetlejuice (1988) was released, and used Belafonte's "Jump in the Line" as the soundtrack's headliner and also "The Banana Boat Song" in the dinner-party scene. Disney's song "Under the Sea", a calypso theme from The Little Mermaid, won an Academy Award for Best Original Song in 1989 as well as the Grammy Award for Best Song Written for Visual Media in 1991.

In the late-1970s a new style, dubbed soca music, emerged from the blending of calypso with elements of East Indian music as well as African American soul, funk, and rock. The soca music of the 1980s featured fast tempos, electric guitars and synthesizers, prominent melodic bass lines, and lyrics celebrating sensuality and dance. Many influential calypso singers including Ras Shorty I, Mighty Sparrow, Lord Kitchener, Calypso Rose, Super Blue, and David Rudder embraced the new style. Brooklyn became an important site for the production of soca records from the late 1970s through the early 1990s.

Although calypso's native land is Trinidad, it is also very popular in Dominica. Dominicans, similar to Trinidadians also developed a keen interest in Caribbean genres such as Soca music, and Calypso in the late 1960s. Called Kaiso in French creole, Calypso is illustrated as a unique form of music, especially during the Carnival season. Dominicans mainly use this genre to express their concerns and feedback on the everyday affairs and happenings of their country. Most of the music pieces composed normally have a negative stigma attached to them, expressing dissatisfaction with how their current government choose to conduct the affairs of the country. The first Calypso monarch in Dominica who was crowned in 1959 was called "The Observer" and the longest reigning Calypso monarch is King Dice. The Calypso tent is not just limited to adult participation. There is also a section called Junior monarch where young children under the age of 14 are able to prepare and compete with their personally made Calypso pieces.

Calypso competitions usually commence in January and culminate in the Calypso monarch competition that are usually held the Saturday before Carnival in February. The winner becomes the Calypso King of that year and joins Miss Dominica, the carnival pageant winner of that year, in the traditional costume parade on Carnival Monday.

== Sociopolitical influence ==
Calypso music has been used by Calypsonians to provide sociopolitical commentary. Prior to the independence of Trinidad and Tobago, calypsonians would use their music to express the daily struggles of living in Trinidad, critique racial and economic inequalities, express opinions on social order, and voice overall concerns for those living on the island. During the colonial era, the Black lower class used calypso music to protest their poor economic situation and the discrimination which they were subjected to. Calypso music frequently was used as a form of musical protest.

During the independence movements of Trinidad and Tobago through the early 1950s up until 1962 when the nation gained independence, calypso lyrics frequently critiqued British colonial rule. Lyrics were made to express feelings towards colonial rule as being immoral and oppressive to Caribbean people. In particular, during the movement to independence, calypso music would include common messages of a desire for independence, opposition to colonial rule and empowerment for people of African descent.

Neville Marcano, known as the Growling Tiger, became notorious for creating songs calling for independence of Trinidad and Tobago. In his song titled "Abraham Lincoln Speech at Gettysburg", Tiger used inspirations from Abraham Lincoln's famous Gettysburg address to draw on values of liberty, equality and democracy. These three principles paralleled some of many ideas circulating during the nationalist movement in Trinidad and Tobago. His lyrics struck with those in support of an independent Trinidadian nation hoping to instill similar principles in their own free nation.

Lord Kitchener, a largely known Calypsonian, became noted for his politically critical lyrics in his music. Kitchener used calypso to shed light on the grievances of the windrush generation, a generation of Caribbean families migrating from the islands to England in response to increased labor demands after World War II. Kitchener's 1948 song "Windrush" was written in two versions. The first version gained more global popularity as the lyrics expressed gratitude and appreciation for British colonial rule. However, second version found greater popularity amongst Caribbean people themselves as the lyrics conveyed a story of West Indian immigrants facing discrimination and cultural alienation while living in Britain. Although Kitchener's alternate version of "Windrush" did not gain as much commercial popularity, the duality of the two versions exemplify how calypso music was used as an outlet for social commentary.

After Trinidad and Tobago gained independence in 1962, calypso music continued to be used as an outlet for political commentary. With Eric Williams serving as the first Prime Minister of an independent Trinidad and Tobago, calypsonian Mighty Sparrow released his song "William the Conqueror" where he praises Williams' victory and prides the island in its newfound independence. Sparrow sings:

I am no politician, but I could understand if it wasn't for Brother Willie and his ability, Trinidad wouldn't go neither come. We used to vote for food and rum but nowadays we eating all the Indians and them. And in the ending, we voting PNM. Praise little Eric, rejoice and be glad. We have a better future here in Trinidad.

Calypso music has also been used by politicians to promote political agendas through Calypso competitions. The origins of calypso competitions dates back to the early 19th century post emancipation where formerly enslaved communities would hold calypso wars showcasing their singing and dancing. Later in 1953 Calypso competitions held the same showcasing nature, but became politicized as the People's National Movement (PNM) took over as the main organizer of competitions. The PNM used the competitions to combat social and class divisions by attracting participants of varying social status to participate and attend the competitions. The idea was to claim a national cultural identity and promote national unity.

- Calypsos have also closely described the evolution of West Indian cricket with more than 500 calypsos about cricket.
- A number of calypsos describe wars or the effects of war, see List of calypso songs about war.

== See also ==
- Brega pop
- Cadence-lypso
- Calypso Monarch
- Extempo
- List of calypso musicians
- List of calypso-like genres
- List of Caribbean music genres
- Marrabenta
