= Roaring Lion (calypsonian) =

Trinidadian calypsonian (1908–1999)

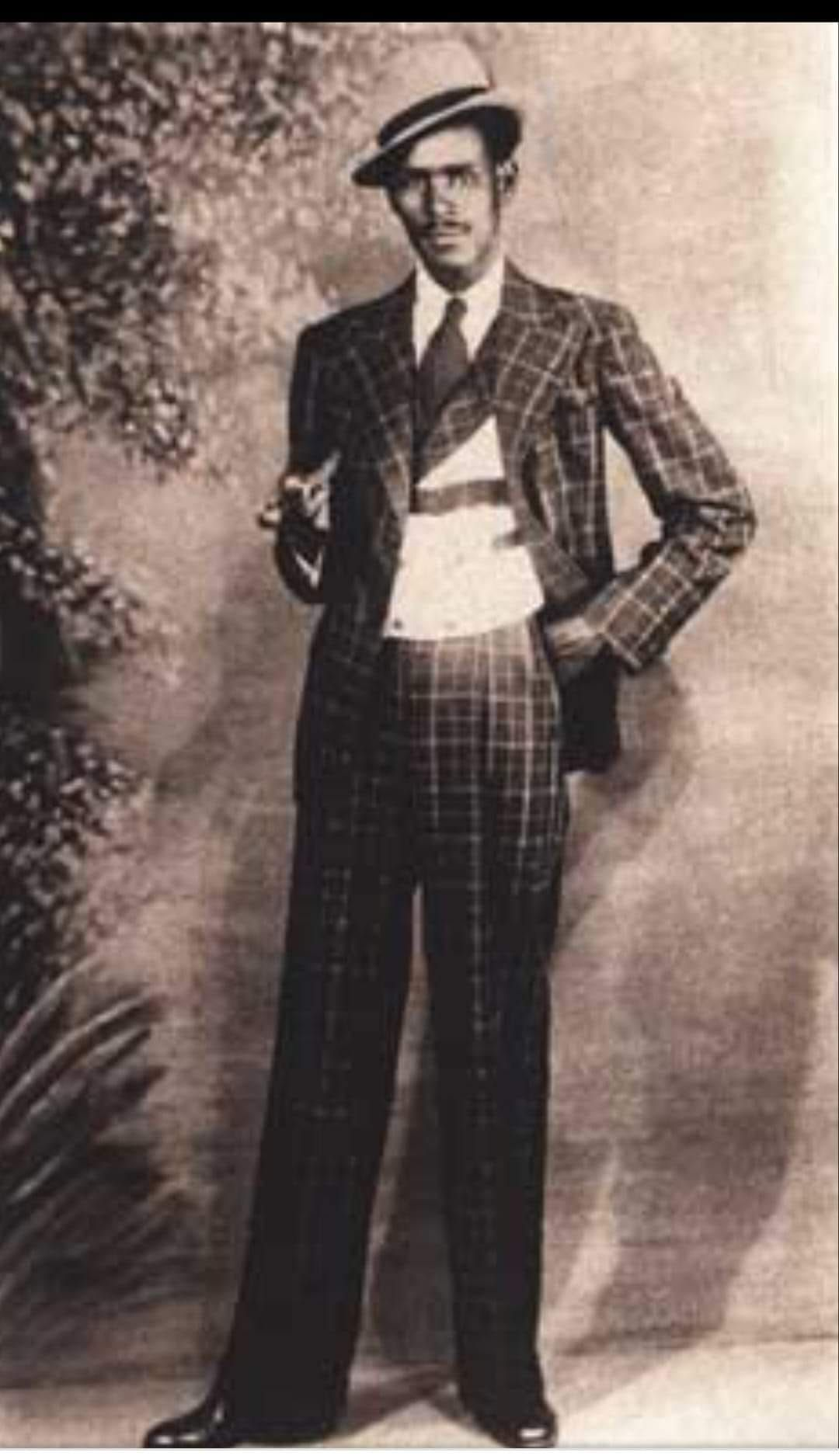

Background information
- Born: Rafael de Leon; 22 February 1908; Aroquita, Trinidad and Tobago
- Died: 11 July 1999 (aged 91) Mt. Lambert, Trinidad and Tobago
- Genres: Calypso
- Occupations: Singer; composer
- Years active: 1930s–1999

Rafael Arias Cairi Llama de Leon, better known as Roaring Lion (22 February 1908 – 11 July 1999) was a Trinidadian calypsonian (calypso singer/composer). His 65-year career began in the early 1930s, and he is best known for his compositions "Ugly Woman" (1933), "Mary Ann" and "Netty, Netty", which are still performed today. The song "If You Wanna Be Happy", which hit number one on the Billboard Hot 100 on 18 May 1963, as well as the R&B singles chart, is based on Roaring Lion's "Ugly Woman".

== Early life ==
Lion was born Rafael de Leon in Aroquita, in the Caura Hills of northern Trinidad, to a mother named Basalicion de Leon and a father named Arias Cairi Llama. An illegitimate child, Lion spent some of his earliest years in two orphanages, before being taken in, following his mother's illness, by an elderly woman named Miss Charles who lived on Coffee Street in the southwestern city of San Fernando.^{a} Finally, he was presented by Charles to a Muslim Indian family in San Fernando who wanted him; he was adopted by Najeeran Khan, who became his adoptive mother. He championed orphanages throughout his career, with songs such as the 1940s "Orphan home", for example.

Although there has long been confusion about his full name, he himself gave it as Rafael Arias Cairi Llama de Leon.^{b} He later met his biological father, who told him that his name, Cairi, was another name for Trinidad,^{c} and that "Llama" is a sort of goat or deer from South America. In a 1990 interview, Roaring Lion stated that "from fear that I might be styled a thief, I only use Rafael Deleon."^{d}^{e}

== Career ==
From a young age, Roaring Lion (de Leon's adopted stage name) became known for his skill in creating calypsos (particularly in his ability to extemporize lyrics on any subject). Contrary to his humble origins, he cultivated a refined stage persona and always appeared sharply dressed. His career officially began in 1924; he cut his first sides in his late teens. He recorded extensively between the 1930s and 1950s, and was one of the calypsonians who deserves the most credit for the increasing international popularity of the genre during this period. In March 1934, the Trinidadian phonograph merchant Eduardo Sa Gomes sent Roaring Lion and Atilla the Hun to New York to record; they became the first calypsonians to record abroad. He was also the only calypsonian vocalist of his generation who could read and write musical notation.

On that trip, Lion entertained the President of the United States-President Franklin D. Roosevelt at the Waldorf Astoria in New York. This was a distinction that no other calypsonian had at that time. When Lion was asked by President Roosevelt where he & Atilla were from, Lion responded, “The Land of Calypso”, a name by which Trinidad is still known. Roaring Lion achieved fame for his linguistic prowess as much as for his catchy tunes. His lyrics, delivered in rapid-fire style, show an impeccable command of the English language (as well as Trinidadian English Creole), and are replete with witty turns of phrase, humorous metaphors, and clever alliteration and internal rhymes. Of all the early calypsonians, he was by far the most scandalous, with the most banned songs by a large margin. His "Netty Netty", the song of a prostitute who left town to have an abortion operation, shocked not only Trinidad and Tobago, but also neighbouring countries such as Grenada, where he was banned for a while (as his song "Excursion to Grenada" relates).

Further, the lyrics of many of his "war calypsoes" (essentially insult songs) presage those of similar hip-hop battle rap songs by over 50 years. An extract from his lyrics to "War" (recorded during the 1930s by Roaring Lion with Executor, Caresser, and Attila and directed against their fellow calypsonian Wilmoth Houdini) is a particularly good example of such lyrics:

The earth is a trembling and a tumbling
And the heavens are falling and all
Because the lion is roaring.
My tongue is like the blast of a gunman...
Destruction, desolation and damnation –
All these I'll inflict on insubordination,
For the Lion in his power is like the rock of Gibraltar.

== Later life ==
Roaring Lion died on 11 July 1999, at the age of 91, in Mt. Lambert, Trinidad. Reports claim that he had ten children. His sons include Ibn Llama de Leon, Ishmael de Leon, Akenathon de Leon, the late Rafael Charles de Leon (who lived in Brooklyn, New York), Mohondas deLeon (who lives in Norway), Karelius de Leon (who lives in Norway), Chris deLeon (who lives in France/USA), and Krishna de Leon (who lives in Paris). His daughters are Victoria Peters (who lives in Trinidad and Tobago), and the late Pamela de Leon-Lewis (who lived in Brooklyn, New York, with her three children: Abigail J. Bishop, Darryl R. Bishop, and youngest daughter Keiela J. Lewis). He was formerly married to the late Marie Louise de Leon, of Norway and she was the mother of four of his children.

In 2002, Akenathon announced plans to turn his father's Mt. Lambert property into a Roaring Lion Museum.

== Notes ==
- ^a The oft-printed statement that Roaring Lion was born "Hubert Raphael Charles" is thus incorrect, at least as far as the surname "Charles" is concerned.
- ^b Although the second name has appeared in print as "Arius," it appears in Lion's book Calypso From France to Trinidad: 800 Years of History as "Arias".
- ^c "Kairi" is, indeed, the aboriginal name for Trinidad in the Kalinago language.
- ^d This published quote has his surname spelled Deleon rather than de Leon, the latter of which Roaring Lion seems to have preferred.
- ^e Although his surname has variously appeared in print as "DeLeon", "de Leon", "De Leon" and "Deleon", Roaring Lion gives his name as "de Leon" in his book Calypso From France to Trinidad: 800 Years of History.
