= The Avalanches discography =

- Studio albums: 4
- Extended plays: 7
- Singles: 25
- Music videos: 15
- Mixtapes: 7

The discography of Australian electronic music group the Avalanches consists of four studio albums, five extended plays, four mixtapes, twenty-two singles, and four music videos.

Trifekta Records released the group's debut single, "Rock City", in September 1997. In December, the group released the EP El Producto on Wondergram Records. Following the success of the EP, Wondergram head Steve Pavlovic signed the group to his new label, Modular Recordings. Additionally, Leo Silvermann signed the group to his Rex Records where they released the EP Undersea Community in March 1999. After numerous delays due to sample clearances and the need for overseas interest, the group released their debut album Since I Left You on 27 November 2000. The album was a surprise success, hitting the top ten in the United Kingdom as well as charting in Australia, France, and Norway. In the United States, the album peaked at number 10 on the Top Electronic Albums chart and at number 31 on the Top Heatseekers chart. Since I Left You was eventually certified platinum by the Australian Recording Industry Association (ARIA) and gold by the British Phonographic Industry (BPI). The album spawned five singles: "Electricity", "Frontier Psychiatrist", "Since I Left You", "Radio", and "A Different Feeling". "Frontier Psychiatrist" and "Since I Left You" were the most successful of the five singles, placing on the charts of Australia, Ireland, Norway, and the United Kingdom.

== Albums ==
=== Studio albums ===
List of studio albums, with selected chart positions and certifications
Title	Album details	Peak chart positions										Certifications	Sales
Title	Album details	AUS	BEL (FL)	FRA	GER	IRL	NLD	NZ	SWE	UK	US	Certifications	Sales
Since I Left You	Released: 27 November 2000; Label: Modular (MODCD009); Formats: CD, LP, cassette	5	—	79	74	9	—	—	51	8	—	ARIA: 2× Platinum; BPI: Gold	US: 77,000
Wildflower	Released: 8 July 2016; Label: Modular; Formats: CD, LP, digital download	1	19	109	60	11	49	12	46	10	27	ARIA: Gold	
We Will Always Love You	Released: 11 December 2020; Label: Modular; Formats: CD, LP, cassette, digital download	4	138	175	100	58	—	—	—	39	148		
No Bad Memories	Released: 16 October 2026; Label: Modular; Formats: CD, LP, cassette, digital download	5	101	196	89	—	—	—	—	60	—		
"—" denotes a recording that did not chart or was not released in that territory

=== Mixtapes ===
List of mixtapes
Title	Album details
Gimix	Released: 24 July 2000; Label: Modular; Formats: CD, cassette
Soca! Sirens! Brains! Live @ St. Jeromes	Released: 2005; Formats: Digital download
Some People	Released: 9 February 2007; Formats: Digital download
Yoga Mind Meld Zombie Relaxation Tape	Released: 19 June 2007; Formats: Digital download
Sleepy Bedtime Mix for Young Ones	As "Henry Chinaski"; Released: 22 April 2012; Podcast: Pinchy & Friends; Formats: Digital download
BBC Radio 1: Radio 1's Essential Mix, The Avalanches	Released: 27 August 2016; Formats: Digital download
The Avalanches & Jamie XX: Live on NTS Radio	Released: 15 May 2020; Formats: Digital download

== Extended plays ==
List of extended plays
Title	EP details
El Producto	Released: 8 December 1997; Label: Wondergram (001GRAM); Formats: CD
Undersea Community	Released: 1 March 1999; Label: Rex (REKD001T); Formats: 10"
A Different Feeling	Released: 27 November 2000; Label: Rex (REKD11T); Formats: 10"
Electricity	Released: 3 December 2001; Label: XL (XLS137CD); Formats: CD
At Last Alone	Released: 12 December 2001; Label: Toy's Factory (TFCK87268); Formats: CD
Subways (The Remixes)	Released: 23 September 2016; Label: Modular; Formats: Digital
Because I'm Me (Remixes)	Released: 23 February 2018; Label: Modular; Formats: Digital

== Singles ==
List of singles, with selected chart positions, showing year released and album name
Title	Year	Peak chart positions										Certifications	Album
Title	Year	AUS	BEL (FL) Tip	IRL	MEX Air.	NLD	NZ Hot	SCO	UK	UK Indie	US Rock	Certifications	Album
"Rock City"	1997	—	—	—	—	—	—	—	—	—	—		El Producto
"Electricity"	1999	—	—	—	—	—	—	—	—	—	—		Since I Left You
"Frontier Psychiatrist"	2000	49	—	—	—	—	—	18	18	2	—	ARIA: Platinum	Since I Left You
"Since I Left You"	2001	67	—	29	—	97	—	20	16	2	—	ARIA: Platinum; RMNZ: Gold	Since I Left You
"Radio"	2001	—	—	—	—	—	—	—	—	—	—		Since I Left You
"A Different Feeling"	2002	—	—	—	—	—	—	—	—	—	—		Since I Left You
"Frankie Sinatra"	2016	34	36	—	31	—	—	—	—	—	33	ARIA: Gold	Wildflower
"Colours"	2016	—	—	—	34	—	—	—	—	—	—		Wildflower
"Subways"	2016	81	—	—	40	—	—	—	—	—	—	ARIA: Gold	Wildflower
"Because I'm Me"	2016	—	—	—	—	—	—	—	—	—	—	ARIA: Platinum	Wildflower
"We Will Always Love You" (featuring Blood Orange)	2020	—	— (Note: "We Will Always Love You" did not enter the Flanders Ultratop Top 50, but charted as an extra tip on the Flanders Ultratop Bubbling Under chart.)	—	—	—	—	—	—	—	—		We Will Always Love You
"Running Red Lights" (featuring Rivers Cuomo and Pink Siifu)	2020	—	—	—	—	—	—	—	—	—	—	ARIA: Gold	We Will Always Love You
"Wherever You Go / Reflecting Light"	2020	—	—	—	—	—	—	—	—	—	—		We Will Always Love You
"Music Makes Me High / Take Care in Your Dreaming"	2020	—	—	—	—	—	—	—	—	—	—		We Will Always Love You
"Interstellar Love" (featuring Leon Bridges)	2020	—	—	—	—	—	—	—	—	—	—		We Will Always Love You
"The Divine Chord" (featuring Johnny Marr and MGMT)	2020	—	18	—	—	—	36	—	—	—	—		We Will Always Love You
"Don’t Forget Your Neighbourhood" (with Cola Boyy)	2021	—	—	—	—	—	—	—	—	—	—		Prosthetic Boombox
"We Go On" (featuring Cola Boyy and Mick Jones)	2021	—	—	—	—	—	—	—	—	—	—		We Will Always Love You
"All You Children" (with Jamie xx)	2024	—	—	—	—	—	—	—	—	—	—		In Waves
"Together" (featuring Nikki Nair, Jessy Lanza and Prentiss)	2026	—	—	—	—	—	—	—	—	—	—		No Bad Memories
"Every Single Weekend" (with Jamie xx)	2026	—	—	—	—	—	—	—	—	—	—		No Bad Memories
"Blue Shadows" (featuring Karen O)	2026	—	—	—	—	—	—	—	—	—	—		No Bad Memories
"Can't Get Over Losing You" (featuring Portraits of Tracy)	2026	—	—	—	—	—	—	—	—	—	—		No Bad Memories
"Far Away" (featuring John Glacier and Khadija Al Hanafi)	2026	—	—	—	—	—	—	—	—	—	—		No Bad Memories
"I Give Everything I Have 2 U" (featuring Loaded Honey)	2026	—	—	—	—	—	38	—	—	—	—		No Bad Memories
"—" denotes a recording that did not chart or was not released in that territory.

== Other appearances ==
List of other appearances, showing year released and album name
Title	Year	Album
"Do You Know the Way to San Jose"	1998	To Hal and Bacharach
"Get Happy"	2013	King Kong

=== Remix work ===
List of remixes produced by The Avalanches for other artists, showing year released and album name
Title	Year	Artist(s)	Album
"Enter Spacecapsule" (Enter the Spaceship Mix)	1999	Gerling	"Enter Spacecapsule" single
"The Shining" (Avalanches Good Word for the Weekend Remix)	2000	Badly Drawn Boy	"Once Around the Block" single
"So Why So Sad" (Sean Penn Mix)	2001	Manic Street Preachers	Know Our B-Sides and "So Why So Sad" single
"I'm a Cuckoo" (Avalanches Mix)	2004	Belle & Sebastian	"I'm a Cuckoo" single
"Chico" (Avalanches' Wernham Hogg Remix)	2004	The Concretes	"Seems Fine" single
"Woman" (Avalanches Millstream Remix)	2006	Wolfmother	"Woman" single
"Fade Together" (Avalanches Remix)	2006	Franz Ferdinand	"Eleanor Put Your Boots On" single
"Stalking to a Stranger" (Planets Collide Remix)	2013	Hunters & Collectors	Crucible: The Songs of Hunters & Collectors
"Out of Control" (The Avalanches Surrender to Love Remix)	2019	The Chemical Brothers	Surrender 20th Anniversary Reissue
"Criminals" (The Avalanches Remix)	2020	DMA's	

== Music videos ==
List of music videos, showing year released and directors
Title	Year	Director(s)
"Frontier Psychiatrist" (version 1)	2000	Geoff McFetridge
"Since I Left You"	2001	Rob Leggatt, Leigh Marling
"Frontier Psychiatrist" (version 2)	2002	Kuntz & Maguire
"Frankie Sinatra"	2016	Fleur & Manu
"Subways"	2016	Mrzyk & Moriceau
"Because I'm Me"	2016	Greg Brunkalla
"The Wozard of Iz"	2016	Soda_Jerk
"Running Red Lights"	2020	Greg Brunkalla
"Wherever You Go"	2020	
"Take Care in Your Dreaming"	2020	
"Interstellar Love"	2020	Jonathan Zawada
"The Divine Chord"	2020	
"We Go On"	2021	Jonathan Zawada, Michael Dole
