= Seltmann =

Seltmann is a German surname. Notable people with the surname include:

- Darren Seltmann, Australian singer-songwriter, musician and producer
- Sally Seltmann (born 1975), Australian singer-songwriter, multi-instrumentalist and Record producer
