= Rock City =

Rock City may refer to:

== Places ==
- Rock City (venue), a music venue in Nottingham, England
- Rock City, an area in Laventille, Trinidad and Tobago

=== United States ===
- Rock City (attraction), tourist attraction in Lookout Mountain, Georgia
- Rock City, Illinois, village
- Rock City, Kansas, National Natural Landmark in Kansas, United States
- Rock City, New York, a hamlet in Dutchess County
- Rock City State Forest, which includes Little Rock City, near Little Valley, New York
- Rock City Falls, New York, a hamlet in Saratoga County
- Rock City Park, New York, a location in Olean (town), New York
- Rock City and McCarty Hill State Forests, a location in Little Valley, New York
- A nickname for Detroit, Michigan

== Music ==
=== Artists ===
- Rock City (band), an American rock band, predecessor to Big Star
- Rock City (duo), an U.S. Virgin Islands songwriting and production team

=== Albums ===
- Rock City (Riot album) or the title song, 1977
- Rock City (Royce da 5'9" album) or the title song (see below), 2002

=== Songs ===
- "Rock City" (song), by Royce da 5'9", 2002
- "Rock City", by Kings of Leon from Mechanical Bull, 2013
- "Rock City", by Krokus from Hardware, 1981
- "Rock City", by The Avalanches from El Producto, 1997
