= El Producto =

El Producto may refer to:

- El-Producto or El-P, stage name of Jaime Meline, an American rapper and hip-hop producer
- El Producto (Walt Mink album)
- El Producto (EP), a 1997 EP by Australian dance band The Avalanches
- El Producto, a brand of cigar manufactured by Altadis
