= Pooka (band) =

- Sharon Lewis and Natasha Jones

Background information
- Origin: Manchester, England
- Genres: Folk; Electronic; Pop; Rock
- Years active: 1992–2002
- Labels: WEA; Elektra; Island; Rough Trade
- Past members: Natasha Jones; Sharon Lewis

Pooka was the former songwriting duo of UK guitarists/vocalists Sharon Lewis and Natasha Jones. They took their name from Púca, a mythical Irish goblin with an uneven temper.

== Career ==
Pooka were formed early in 1992 at Nottingham Polytechnic. After only a few months of forming the band Lewis and Jones decided to try their luck in London to find a record company to work with. They did this by visiting record companies in person, guitars in hand, and performing their songs live to various talent scouts. This eventually led to their gaining a 5 album recording contract with WEA. Pooka's eponymous debut album (produced by John Coxon) was released in 1993 on WEA (Elektra in the USA).

Tours with Everything But The Girl, Tindersticks, Kristin Hersh, Al Stewart and The Levellers followed and, between recording their own material, Pooka co-wrote tracks with Ultramarine found upon their 1995 release Bel Air, and a track for Orbital, "Otono", released on their 1999 album The Middle of Nowhere.

Pooka's second album, Spinning, was released in September 1997 on Trade 2, a subsidiary of Island Records and managed by ex-Rough Trade founder Geoff Travis.

Garnering praise and support while on tour throughout Europe in the next two years, Pooka released a five-song EP, Monday Mourning, in 1999 on the French Telescopic Records label. In 2001, Lewis and Jones independently released Fools Give Birth To Angels, a self-produced, classically written and arranged collection of new songs, replete with string sections and a hand bell choir. Only 1,000 copies of the CD were produced.

Soon thereafter, their ten-year musical partnership came to an abrupt end, but not before the Rough Trade release of their fourth album Shift. Both Jones and Lewis continue to play live, and have since each released two solo albums.

== Discography ==
=== Studio albums ===
- 1993 - Pooka
- 1997 - Spinning
- 2001 - Fools Give Birth To Angels
- 2001 - Shift

=== Vinyl singles ===
- 1995 - "Sweet Butterfly"/"Love Song"
- 1996 - "The Insect"/"The Sun"
- 1997 - "Mean Girl"/"Cherry Orchard"

=== Extended plays ===
- 1993 - City Sick (Also available as a Cassingle)
- 1994 - Graham Robert Wood
- 1997 - Mean Girl
- 1999 - Monday Mourning

=== Songs on compilation albums ===
- 1993 - "Between my Knees" on the album Kale1doscope (various artists)
- 1999 - "Monsoon" on the album Playpen - An Album of New Acoustic Music (various artists)
- 2001 - "Yes Lad" on the album POPvolume#2 (various artists)

=== Collaborations ===
- 1995 - Bel Air by Ultramarine (Pooka are credited on 4 tracks)
- 1996 - Soundtrack To Spleen by PJ Harvey drummer Rob Ellis (Pooka are credited on 2 tracks)
- 1999 - The Middle of Nowhere by Orbital (Pooka are credited on 1 track - "Otoño")
- 1999 - Style (CD Two) by Orbital (Pooka are credited on 1 track - "An Fhómhair")
- 2000 - Tchin Tchin by Superflu. (Pooka are credited on 1 track - "Le Secret". Only available on the 'Bonus tracks' edition)

=== Sampled ===
- 2020 - We Will Always Love You by The Avalanches. Track 24, Music is the Light samples the Pooka song of the same name originally found upon both Fools Give Birth To Angels and Shift.
