= Style (Orbital song) =

Single by Orbital

from the album The Middle of Nowhere
- Released: 8 March 1999
- Recorded: 1998
- Genre: Electronica
- Length: 6:24; 4:07 (Radio Edit)
- Label: FFRR
- Songwriter(s): P&P Hartnoll
- Producer(s): P&P Hartnoll

Orbital singles chronology
"The Saint" (1997)	"Style" (1999)	"Nothing Left" (1999)

"Style" is a 1999 single by the electronica duo Orbital. It was their fourth consecutive single, and fifth overall, to reach the top 20 of the UK singles chart, peaking at number 13.

The track takes its name from the analogue electronic musical instrument, the stylophone, which is used extensively on the track. The main version includes a sample of "Oh L'amour" performed by Dollar, while the "Bigpipe Style" version (which features the main riff played on bagpipes) samples Suzi Quatro's hit "Devil Gate Drive". Orbital's request to use a sample from a Rolf Harris stylophone demonstration disc was turned down. The other versions are "Old Style", a more club-oriented dance mix; and "New Style", a retro-styled version with live bass by Andy James.

All of the mixes are by Orbital themselves; the duo had wanted Stereolab to remix the track, but the latter group were on tour at the time and unavailable, so the "New Style" mix is Orbital's own version of a Stereolab-type mix.

Two other tracks were included on the single. They were "An Fhómhair", which is a heavily reworked version of album track "Otoño" (featuring Pooka on vocals), and "Mock Tudor", a blend of heavy club beats and baroque-style melody in 7/4 time.

== Track listing ==
All tracks written and produced by P & P Hartnoll.

CD 1 (UK)

1. "Style" – 4:07
2. "Mock Tudor" – 7:38
3. "Old Style" – 5:54

CD 2 (UK)

1. "Bigpipe Style" – 5:16
2. "An Fhómhair" – 6:58
3. "New Style" – 4:57

12" vinyl (UK)

1. "Style" – 4:07
2. "Bigpipe Style" – 5:16
3. "New Style" – 4:57
4. "Old Style" – 5:54

== Charts ==
Chart (1999)	Peak position
UK Dance (OCC)	3
UK Singles (OCC)	13
