= Cola Boyy =

American musician and disability activist (1990–2024)

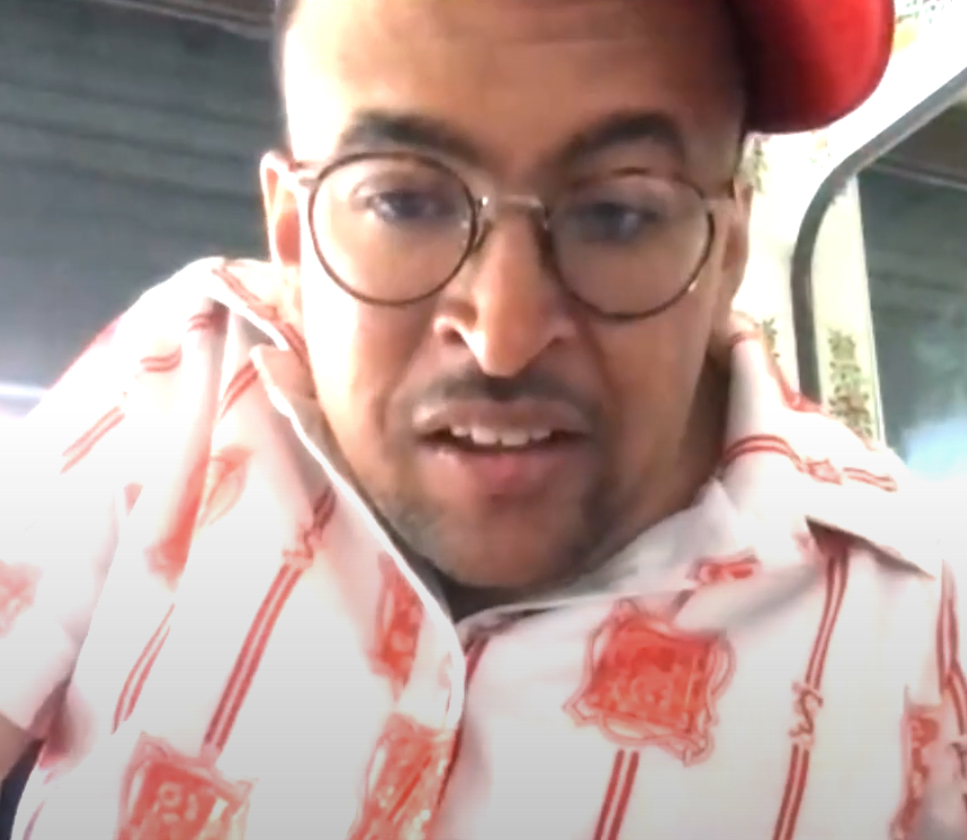
- Urango in 2021

Background information
- Also known as: The Disabled Disco Innovator
- Born: Matthew Joseph Urango; February 14, 1990; Oxnard, California, U.S.
- Died: March 17, 2024 (aged 34) Oxnard, California, US
- Genres: Disco; pop; funk
- Occupations: Musician, disability activist
- Label: Record Makers
- Website: https://colaboyy.bandcamp.com/

Matthew Joseph Urango (February 14, 1990 – March 17, 2024), known professionally as Cola Boyy, was an American musician and disability activist based in Oxnard, California. His debut EP, Black Boogie Neon, was released in 2018. His debut album Prosthetic Boombox was released in 2021. Urango toured and collaborated with MGMT. His music has been described as belonging to the disco genre. NME compared his sound to "a disco ball melting or the after-effects of some particularly potent hallucinogenics".

== Life and career ==
=== 1990–2018: Early life and education ===
Matthew Joseph Urango was born in Oxnard, California, on February 14, 1990; from birth, he had spina bifida, kyphosis, and scoliosis, as well as a club foot. He described himself as Afro-Latino. Urango had a non-disabled twin brother.

Urango said that he "basically taught [himself]" to play piano at his grandmother's house as a child. In high school he played in punk bands, playing his first backyard show aged 17. After graduating from high school, he searched for work but experienced discrimination due to his disability. He was employed for a time at Walmart until he was hospitalized with pneumonia due to being pushed to overwork by his employer. Before Cola Boyy, Urango played second guitar for indie pop band Sea Lions.

=== 2018-20: Cola Boyy debut, Black Boogie Neon & Coachella ===
After playing in punk and powerviolence bands in his early twenties, Urango began posting disco-influenced solo material online. The music was discovered by César Wogue of the French label, Record Makers, who passed it on to label co-founder Marc Teissier du Cros; Teissier signed Urango after seeing one of his early performances in Los Angeles.

Cola Boyy released his debut single "Penny Girl" in July 2018. It featured a video by David Luraschi set in Oxnard, on the video Urango spoke to the Fader saying, "This is not just my world, but a part of me that's so vulnerable. All my differences are on the table, and my song plays in the background. Oxnard has so many bright colors and faces, it shows in the video. Isn't it nice?"

The track was ranked #72 in Fader Magazine's "100 best songs of 2018".

In August 2018, "Buggy Tip" premiered on Vice's Noisey.

Cola Boyy released his debut EP Black Boogie Neon in September 2018. The EP includes earlier releases "Penny Girl" and "Buggy Tip". The name of the EP comes from an early demo track about a fictional club of the same name where disabled people can enjoy themselves. In the video for "Beige 70", filmed at the real-life Le Peripate club in Paris, Urango is portrayed in this club as a part of a diverse cast of club-goers. Explaining the song's meaning, Urango said: "It's a love song about a girl at a club whose clothes are shabby and her friends are making fun of her, but it doesn't matter to me because she's a star. It's about being judged and accepted."

In 2019, Cola Boyy performed at Pitchfork Paris. He also was invited to perform at Coachella 2019 on the Sonara stage.

=== 2020-21: Work with The Avalanches, MGMT, & Prosthetic Boombox ===
In 2020, Urango appeared on "We Go On", a single from The Avalanches' third album We Will Always Love You alongside Mick Jones. The collaboration led to further work with the group on his debut album. Prosthetic Boombox, released on Record Makers in June 2021, featured guest appearances from Nicolas Godin of Air, John Carroll Kirby, Myd, Andrew VanWyngarden of MGMT and The Avalanches.

In April 2021, he released the single "Kid Born in Space", featuring MGMT. Urango explained that the song is about his experience growing up as a disabled person.

Paste gave the album a positive review, describing it as "an electrifying, catchy and colorful debut". The Guardian gave the album 4 out of 5 stars, describing the record as a "delirious blast of disco, funk, house and psychedelia".

=== 2025: Quit To Play Chess ===
The second and final Cola Boyy album, Quit To Play Chess, was released on May 23, 2025 on Record Makers. The album title is a reference to Marcel Duchamp who notably transitioned away from art to chess late in his career.

== Political views ==
Multiple features about Cola Boyy as a musician have made reference to his left-wing activism, which he became involved in around the time he began making music as Cola Boyy. Urango became politicized after participating in a radical reading group that he was invited to by a friend. He organized with Todo Poder Al Pueblo, a collective that advocates for immigrants and workers in Urango's home city of Oxnard. He was also a member of APOC (Anarchist People of Color), which helps to organize free punk rock concerts accessible to all ages.

Urango eventually distanced himself from these activist groups, after realising that they were detrimental to his mental health and career.

== Death ==
Urango died on March 17, 2024, at his Oxnard home at the age of 34. No cause of death was disclosed.

== Discography ==
=== Studio albums ===
Year	Album details
2021	Prosthetic Boombox: Released: June 18, 2021; Label: Record Makers; Format: Vinyl, digital download

Year	Album details
2025	Quit to Play Chess: Released: May 23, 2025; Label: Record Makers; Format: Vinyl, digital download

=== EPs ===
Year	Album details
2018	Black Boogie Neon: Released: September 21, 2018; Label: Record Makers; Format: Vinyl, digital download

=== Featured appearances ===
Year	Single	Album
2018	"Muchas" (Myd featuring Cola Boyy)	Non-Album Single
2020	"Foundation" (Nicolas Godin featuring Cola Boyy)	"Concrete and Glass"
2020	"We Go On" (The Avalanches featuring Cola Boyy)	We Will Always Love You
2021	"Unity" (Juan Wauters featuring Cola Boyy)	Real Life Situations
2021	"Beat 100" (Benny Sings featuring Cola Boyy)	Beat Tape II
2021	"Fun Machine" (Frank Leone, Tear Drop Estates Featuring Cola Boyy)	Sundrop
2025	"I Need It From You" (Blasé featuring Cola Boyy)	BLABLABLA
