= We Will Always Love You =

Studio album by the Avalanches
- Released: 11 December 2020
- Recorded: 2017–2020
- Studios: Sing Sing (Melbourne, Victoria)
- Genres: Sampledelia; psychedelia; dance; pop
- Length: 71:29
- Label: Modular
- Producer: Robbie Chater

The Avalanches chronology
Wildflower (2016)	We Will Always Love You (2020)	No Bad Memories (2026)

Singles from We Will Always Love You
- 1. "We Will Always Love You" Released: 20 February 2020; 2. "Running Red Lights" Released: 18 March 2020; 3. "Wherever You Go / Reflecting Light" Released: 22 July 2020; 4. "Music Makes Me High / Take Care in Your Dreaming" Released: 14 September 2020; 5. "Interstellar Love" Released: 30 October 2020; 6. "The Divine Chord" Released: 11 December 2020; 7. "We Go On" Released: 18 March 2021

We Will Always Love You is the third studio album from Australian electronic group The Avalanches, released on 11 December 2020 through Modular Recordings.

== Background ==
The Avalanches (Robbie Chater and Tony Di Blasi) released their second studio album, Wildflower, in 2016. As the album came 16 years after their debut, Since I Left You, the group felt they now had a clean slate to work on new material. While on tour for Wildflower in early 2017, Chater left the tour to battle his alcoholism at a detox facility. Di Blasi continued the tour with a full backing band. After the tour was completed, they began work on a new album. Before production began, Chater sold most of his collection of 7,000 records to nurture a fresh start.

== Production ==
We Will Always Love You is built on sampling, but is less of a plunderphonics record than the band's previous material. Chater explained that making sample-based music is time-consuming. According to Chater, Since I Left You had 900 samples, and We Will Always Love You "still contains hundreds and hundreds of samples [...] fragmented across the record." The group set out to use samples as the basis of songs, but added instrumentation to build out the sound they wanted to achieve more easily and quickly. The Avalanches brought in musician and friend Andrew Szekeres to help push production along in this manner. They also brought in guest vocalists because doing so took less time than searching for samples for months, although Chater still compared finding the right vocalist to searching for a sample.

One of the first songs recorded for the album was "Reflecting Light," which samples "Glow Worms" from the 1970 English folk record Just Another Diamond Day by Vashti Bunyan. The title track "We Will Always Love You" features vocals from Blood Orange and samples from "Hammond Song" by the Roches and "I'll Take You Any Way That You Come" by Smokey Robinson and the Miracles. "Running Red Lights" is dedicated to David Berman and features lyrics from the Purple Mountains song "Darkness and Cold." It features vocalists Pink Siifu and Rivers Cuomo. "Music Makes Me High" is a stylistic throwback to older house music, like that found on the label Crydamoure or Basement Jaxx's debut album Remedy (1999). The lead sample from Salty Miller reminded Chater of "Red Alert." "Take Care in Your Dreaming" features vocalists Denzel Curry, Sampa the Great, and Tricky. Curry's verse was recorded in 2019, and the others in 2020.

The album features many collaborators: Sananda Maitreya, Vashti Bunyan, Blood Orange, Rivers Cuomo, Pink Siifu, Denzel Curry, Tricky, Sampa the Great, Leon Bridges, Johnny Marr, MGMT, Clypso, Neneh Cherry, Jamie xx, Kelly Moran, Cornelius, Karen O, Kurt Vile, Mick Jones, Cola Boyy, Perry Farrell, Wayne Coyne, and Orono.

== Concept and artwork ==
The album's concept is rooted in "death, the afterlife, the stars, celestial beings and everything that's out there" in the context of their tendency to sample music from artists who have died. Chater explains:

"When we're sampling very, very old recorded music, the singer may have long passed so it's almost like summoning spirits [...] If we sample a record from the 40s, someone else has owned that record for maybe 50 years and played it a million times, and so they've added to the crackles on the vinyl. Then that record came into my life, and we sampled it and made a song out of it. [...] It's just a beautiful flow of energy that we're only a small part of, so the album reflects all those sorts of processes."

The cover art features an image of Ann Druyan, creative director of the Voyager Golden Record project. The image, modified from the photo taken by Bettina Cirone around 1980, was run through a spectrograph, turned into sound, then processed back into an image. The group wanted to work with her after hearing that the sound of her heartbeat captured for the Golden Record was recorded the day after Carl Sagan proposed to her. They booked studio time to record her voice for the album, but she canceled it. She still permitted them to use her image on the cover.

The album was almost titled Pink Champagne with cover art of a pink galaxy, but they thought it sounded too much like Drake.

== Release and promotion ==
On 11 February 2020, the Avalanches posted a photo of a promotional billboard in Melbourne advertising a website. On the website, a video containing several faint voices was played, followed by a Morse code message stating 'WWALY'. On 14 February, the website was updated with a second video containing another morse code message, this time spelling "20 FEB." Two days later, on 16 February, the Avalanches posted a photo of a second billboard in London.

The first two singles released were "We Will Always Love You" on 20 February and "Running Red Lights" on 18 March 2020. The group originally only planned to release those two singles and then the album in May, but because the COVID-19 pandemic delayed CD and vinyl pressings, management delayed the release. The vinyl plants in the United States shut down, leaving the group to use a plant in Eastern Europe, which could not deliver the record until December. The album was not officially announced until 9 September 2020. On 22 July, the group released the double-A-sided single "Wherever You Go" / "Reflecting Light". Accompanying these singles were music video visualizers directed by Jonathan Zawada. Another double-A-sided single, "Music Makes Me High" / "Take Care in Your Dreaming", was released on 14 September. The fifth single was "Interstellar Love" released on 30 October. A live performance of the song was recorded for The Sound and aired on 15 November 2020. On 11 December 2020, the band released "The Divine Chord" with Johnny Marr and MGMT, alongside its music video.

== Critical reception ==
Professional ratings
Aggregate scores
Source	Rating
AnyDecentMusic?	8.0/10
Metacritic	86/100
Review scores
Source	Rating
AllMusic	4/5 stars
The Daily Telegraph	4/5 stars
DIY	4/5 stars
The Guardian	4/5 stars
The Independent	5/5 stars
The Irish Times	5/5 stars
NME	4/5 stars
Paste	7.7/10
Pitchfork	8.1/10
Rolling Stone	4/5 stars

We Will Always Love You received widespread acclaim from music critics. It carries a "universal acclaim" rating on Metacritic with an average rating of 86/100 and was included in their list of 2020's best albums. The ABC hailed the album as a "genuine masterpiece," and Clash said that it was "arguably the best of The Avalanches' trio of releases thus far." Several reviews remarked favourably on the quality of the sampling on the album and its mature sound and themes. Mark Beaumont in The Independent noted that the group had "tempered their youthful party vibe to contemplate themes of the afterlife and cosmic profundity." At the same time, Julien A. Luebbers in The Spokesman-Review similarly remarked on the album's thematic sophistication, calling the album "a soaring testimony to spirituality and being part of something greater than ourselves" and "a piece of true artistic brilliance." On the other hand, PopMatters gave the sole review of the album marked "mixed" by Metacritic, criticising both the multiple guest appearances on the album and the "polemical" nature of its themes.

At the 2021 ARIA Music Awards, the album was nominated for Album of the Year, Best Group and Best Pop Release, while Robbie Chater was nominated for Producer of the Year, Tony Espie was nominated for Engineer of the Year and Jonathan Zawada was nominated for Best Cover Art for work on this album. In March 2021, it was awarded the Australian Music Prize 2020. At the J Awards of 2021, the album was nominated for Australian Album of the Year. At the 2021 Music Victoria Awards, the album was nominated for Best Victorian Album.

== Track listing ==
We Will Always Love You track listing
No.	Title	Writer(s)	Length
1.	"Ghost Story" (featuring Orono)	Robbie Chater; Tony Di Blasi; Orono Noguchi	1:23
2.	"Song for Barbara Payton"	Chater; Di Blasi	1:40
3.	"We Will Always Love You" (featuring Blood Orange)	Chater; Di Blasi; Devonté Hynes; William "Smokey" Robinson	2:52
4.	"The Divine Chord" (featuring MGMT and Johnny Marr)	Chater; Di Blasi; Ben Goldwasser; Andrew VanWyngarden; Burt Bacharach; Hal David	3:07
5.	"Solitary Ceremonies"	Chater; Di Blasi	1:14
6.	"Interstellar Love" (featuring Leon Bridges)	Chater; Di Blasi; Leon Bridges; Austen Jenkins; Alan Parsons; Eric Woolfson; Livingston Matthews	3:38
7.	"Ghost Story Pt. 2" (featuring Orono and Leon Bridges)	Chater; Di Blasi; Noguchi; Bridges	1:15
8.	"Reflecting Light" (featuring Sananda Maitreya and Vashti Bunyan)	Chater; Di Blasi; Sananda Maitreya; Vashti Bunyan	4:21
9.	"Carrier Waves"	Chater; Di Blasi	0:57
10.	"Oh the Sunn!" (featuring Perry Farrell)	Chater; Di Blasi; Perry Farrell	2:18
11.	"We Go On" (featuring Cola Boyy and Mick Jones)	Chater; Di Blasi; Gary Geld; Peter Udell; Matthew Urango	4:01
12.	"Star Song.IMG"	Chater; Di Blasi	0:10
13.	"Until Daylight Comes" (featuring Tricky)	Chater; Di Blasi; Delroy Murray; Robin Achampong; Adrian Nicholas Matthew Thaws	2:27
14.	"Wherever You Go" (featuring Jamie xx, Neneh Cherry and Clypso)	Chater; Di Blasi; James Smith; Clypso; Neneh Cherry; Cameron McVey	5:50
15.	"Music Makes Me High"	Chater; Di Blasi; Nelson B. Miller; Stu Gardner; Billi Rucker	3:21
16.	"Pink Champagne"	Chater; Di Blasi	0:12
17.	"Take Care in Your Dreaming" (featuring Denzel Curry, Tricky and Sampa the Great)	Chater; Di Blasi; Denzel Curry; Thaws; Sampa Tembo	5:00
18.	"Overcome"	Chater; Di Blasi	3:31
19.	"Gold Sky" (featuring Kurt Vile)	Chater; Di Blasi; Kurt Vile; Wayne Coyne	4:28
20.	"Always Black" (featuring Pink Siifu)	Chater; Di Blasi; Matthews	3:36
21.	"Dial D for Devotion" (featuring Karen O)	Chater; Di Blasi; David Berman; Jeremy Earl; Steven Taveniere	0:31
22.	"Running Red Lights" (featuring Rivers Cuomo and Pink Siifu)	Chater; Di Blasi; Rivers Cuomo; Berman; Earl; Taveniere	4:39
23.	"Born to Lose"	Chater; Di Blasi; Bridges; Eric Frederic; Nate Mercereau; Wayne Hector; Jenkins; Joshua Block; Chris Vivion; Steve Reich	4:53
24.	"Music Is the Light" (featuring Cornelius and Kelly Moran)	Chater; Di Blasi; Keigo Oyamada; Kelly Moran; Sharon Lewis	3:08
25.	"Weightless"	Chater; Di Blasi; Frank Drake; SETI	2:57
Total length:			71:29

Samples

- "We Will Always Love You" contains portions of "I'll Take You Any Way That You Come", written by William "Smokey" Robinson, and performed by Smokey Robinson and the Miracles; and samples from "Hammond Song", written and composed by Margaret A. Roche, and performed by the Roches.
- "The Divine Chord" contains portions of "It's Love That Really Counts (In the Long Run)", written by Hal David and Burt Bacharach, and performed by the Shirelles.
- "Interstellar Love" contains samples from "Eye in the Sky", written by Alan Parsons and Eric Woolfson, as performed by the Alan Parsons Project.
- "Reflecting Lights" incorporates a sample of "Glow Worms", written and performed by Vashti Bunyan.
- "We Go On" contains vocal samples of Karen Carpenter from the Carpenters' "Hurting Each Other" as the refrain.
- "Until Daylight Comes" contains a sample of "Sunshine", written by Robin Achampong and Delroy Murray, and performed by Total Contrast.
- "Wherever You Go" incorporates elements of "Magalenha" by Carlinhos Brown.
- "Music Makes Me High" contains a sample of "Music Makes Me High" written by Nelson B. Miller, and performed by Salty Miller; and excerpts from "Keep On Holdin' On", written by Stu Gardner and Billi Rucker, and performed by the Devoted Souls.
- "Take Care In Your Dreaming" contains a sample of Ghost Tape Number 10.
- "Gold Sky" contains a sample from "Last Train Home", written by Pat Metheny, and performed by the Pat Metheny Group.
- "Born to Lose" contains a sample of "Bad Bad News" written by Leon Bridges, Eric Frederic, Nate Mercereau, Wayne Hector, Austen Jenkins, Joshua Block and Chris Vivion; and incorporates elements of "Electric Counterpoint: I. Fast", written by Steve Reich and performed by Mats Bergström.
- "Music Is the Light" contains a sample of "Music Is the Light", written and performed by Sharon Lewis.

== Personnel ==
- The Avalanches – instruments (1–11, 13–25)
  - Robbie Chater – production, mixing
  - Tony Di Blasi – additional production (1–11, 13–15, 17–20, 22, 23, 25), mix supervision
- Andy Szekeres – additional production (1–11, 13–15, 17–20, 22, 23, 25), instruments (1–11, 13–25)
- iZNiiK – additional production (17)
- Orono – vocals (1, 7, 25)
- Devonté Hynes – vocals (3)
- The Australian Boys Choir – additional vocals (3)
- John Carroll Kirby – piano (3, 8, 17, 20), Moog (4, 8, 17), DX7 (4, 8), treated piano (24)
- Kelly Moran – prepared piano (3, 24), piano (24)
- MGMT – vocals (4), additional vocals (5)
- Johnny Marr – guitar (4)
- The Yarra Voices Choir – additional vocals (4, 11)
- Leon Bridges – vocals (6, 7)
- Sananda Maitreya – vocals (8)
- Perry Farrell – vocals (10)
- Etty Farrell – additional vocals (10)
- Tom Rowlands – EMS and Roland System 700 synthesisers (10)
- Mick Jones – vocals (11), piano (14)
- Cola Boyy – vocals (11)
- Tricky – vocals (13, 17)
- Marta – vocals (13)
- Neneh Cherry – vocals (14)
- Clypso – vocals (14)
- Cameron McVey – additional vocals (14)
- East Coast Inspirational Singers – vocals (15)
- Pink Siifu – vocals (16, 20, 22)
- Denzel Curry – vocals (17)
- Sampa the Great – vocals (17)
- Kurt Vile – guitars (19), vocals (19)
- Wayne Coyne – additional vocals (19)
- Farmer Dave Scher – keyboards (19), lap steel (19), melodica (19)
- Karen O – vocals (21)
- Rivers Cuomo – vocals (22)
- Mike Callander – additional modular tweaks (22), granular synths (22), tape delays (22), noise (22)
- Cornelius – vocals (24)
- Tony Espie – mix supervision
- Clint Welander – mix engineering (1–11, 13–24)
- Zachary Zajdel – assistant engineering (1–11, 13–24)
- Nate Haessly – assistant engineering (3, 4, 6, 20, 24)
- Joe LaPorta – mastering
- Christian Scallan – recording (choir on 3, 4, 10, 23; EME transmissions on 7–9), Arecibo message 2020 sonification (25)
- Jarvis Taveniere – recording (Kurt Vile and Farmer Dave Scher on 19)
- Jonathan Zawada – Barbara Payton sonification (12)
- Franck Marchis – Arecibo message 2020 sonification (25)

== Charts ==
Chart performance for We Will Always Love You
Chart (2020–2021)	Peak position
Australian Albums (ARIA)	4
Belgian Albums (Ultratop Flanders)	138
French Albums (SNEP)	175
German Albums (Offizielle Top 100)	100
Irish Albums (IRMA)	58
UK Albums (Official Charts)	39
US Billboard 200	148
