= Since I Left You (song) =

Single by the Avalanches

from the album Since I Left You
- B-side: "Everyday"; "Thank You Caroline"
- Released: 5 February 2001
- Recorded: 2000
- Genre: Plunderphonics, easy listening, psychedelia
- Length: 4:22
- Label: Modular; XL; Elektra
- Songwriters: Robbie Chater; Tony Diblasi; Edward Drennen; Gordon McQuilten; Jeanne Salo; Darren Seltmann; Jimmy Webb
- Producers: Robbie Chater; Darren Seltmann

The Avalanches singles chronology
"Frontier Psychiatrist" (2000)	"Since I Left You" (2001)	"Radio" (2001)

"Since I Left You" is a song by Australian electronic dance music group the Avalanches. It was released as the third single from the group's debut studio album of the same name on 5 February 2001. Produced by group members Robbie Chater and Darren Seltmann, "Since I Left You" utilizes numerous samples of other artists' material. The song's chorus is a prominent vocal sample of the Main Attraction's "Everyday" (1968).

The song was critically acclaimed by listeners and music critics alike, who praised its sample-based production and upbeat atmosphere; several publications named it one of the best singles of 2001. "Since I Left You" appeared in the singles charts of Australia and several European countries, never reaching the top ten. A surrealistic music video for the song was directed by Rob Leggatt and Leigh Marling, and depicts two miners who find a mysterious passage into a dance studio. It won the group an MTV Europe Music Award for Best Video.

== Background and composition ==
The Avalanches started working on their debut album in 2000. Production was handled by group members Robbie Chater and Darren Seltmann, who composed the album's songs by sampling music from vinyl records and manipulating them using Yamaha Promix 01 and Akai S2000 samplers. The song "Since I Left You" was recorded by the group at Soft Light Bistro. Its final mixing process was carried out at the Sing Sing recording studio by Chater, Seltmann and Tony Espie.

"Since I Left You"
A 24-second sample of the song, featuring its sampled chorus

A dance song of four minutes and twenty-two seconds in length, "Since I Left You" is primarily sample-based. The track features doo-wop vocal harmonies and employs various pieces of instrumentation, including organs, flutes and acoustic guitars. Its chorus, sampled from "Everyday" by the Main Attraction, features a woman singing about leaving her lover. The "Everyday" sample was the final element of "Since I Left You" to be added by Chater and Seltmann, and the former stated that its addition was a moment when they "really succeeded in writing a pop song." The original song described a woman's happiness after meeting a man, but Chater and Seltmann re-arranged various vocals to make the final sample appear to describe a break-up. Other sample sources include Rose Royce's "Daddy Rich", Tony Mottola's "Anema e core" and "By the Time I Get to Phoenix", the Duprees' "The Sky's the Limit", Lamont Dozier's "Take Off Your Make-Up" and Klaus Wunderlich's "Let's Do the Latin Hustle".

== Release ==
A demo version of "Since I Left You" was included on a mixtape sold by the Avalanches at their gigs in mid-2000 in an attempt to prevent the spreading of bootlegged copies of an unfinished version of the group's debut album – the tape was re-released with the title Gimix later that year. The finished version of the track was included on their debut album Since I Left You and subsequently released as its third single on 5 February 2001. The CD single contained the non-album track "Everyday" and a remix by English electronic musician Andy Votel of a previously released B-side, "Thank You Caroline". Remixes of "Since I Left You" by alternative music band Stereolab and producers Prince Paul and Cornelius were created for the single's American release.

=== Commercial performance ===
"Since I Left You" entered the Australian national singles chart at number 67 on the week ending 19 February 2001, spending an additional week on the chart before dropping out. The track entered and peaked at number 16 on the UK Singles Chart on the issue dated 7 April 2001, spending a total of seven weeks on the chart. In the Netherlands, it charted for one week at number 97. "Since I Left You" debuted at its peak position of 29 in Ireland and remained on the singles chart for five weeks.

== Critical reception ==
"Since I Left You" received widespread critical acclaim. Sal Cinquemani of Slant Magazine gave the song a positive review, praising it for "allow[ing] the sampled performances to truly glisten." Allmusic's MacKenzie Wilson also spoke favourably of "Since I Left You", remarking that it "leaves listeners spellbound and in a summer dreamscape of lushness and simplicity." Matt LeMay of Pitchfork wrote that the "beauty" of the song "lies in the way that the Avalanches turn obvious sonic mismatches into something all their own". Playlouder named "Since I Left You" the twenty-ninth best single of 2001, calling it "shimmeringly gorgeous" and "much greater than the sum of its parts, and the parts were pretty good to start with." NME and Rockdelux both included the track in their respective year-end best single lists.

Pitchfork placed "Since I Left You" at number 40 on their list of the best singles of the 2000s. The song also ranked number 69 on Stylus Magazine's decade-end list, with writer Ally Brown commenting: "A decade in, nothing's come close to matching 'Since I Left You''s distillation of pure joy from a hundred different songs." Q included "Since I Left You" in their lists of the Ultimate Music Collection and the 1,001 Best Songs Ever.

In 2025, the song ranked 93 on the Triple J Hottest 100 of Australian Songs.

== Music video ==
The music video for "Since I Left You" was directed by Rob Leggatt and Leigh Marling, both members of the Blue Source video direction team. It follows the story of two miners in a black-and-white world who find a passage into a dance studio situated in a colour world. The majority of the video consists of one of the miners dancing with two dancers, with the other not having the courage or skill to join in. The video ends with the dancing miner finding love with one of the dancers, thus leaving his friend, who fades back into black-and-white. The principal miner, 'Arthur' was performed by the Welsh choreographer and cameo actor Steve Elias. The Avalanches had originally envisioned a video concept involving synchronized swimmers on an ocean cruise liner, but their record company rejected it.

The clip later won Best Video at the 2001 MTV Europe Music Awards. Pitchfork placed it at number four on their list of the Top 50 Music Videos of the 2000s, with writer Scott Plagenhoef noting that the video "transform[s] the disparate and the out-of-place into something new and joyful, and it does that with the right blend of heart and surrealism."

== Formats and track listings ==
- CD single (Australia and United Kingdom)
1. "Since I Left You" – 4:22
2. "Everyday" – 7:02
3. "Thank You Caroline" (Andy Votel remix) – 4:08
- 12-inch single (United States)

Side one

1. "Since I Left You" (Prince Paul remix featuring Breeze and Kelli Sae) – 3:47
2. "Since I Left You" (Stereolab remix) – 4:35

Side two

1. "Since I Left You" (Cornelius remix) – 5:35
2. "Since I Left You" – 4:22

== Credits and personnel ==
Credits for "Since I Left You" adapted from CD single and Since I Left You album liner notes.

Recording

- Recorded at Soft Light Bistro.
- Final mix at Sing Sing.

Personnel

- Robbie Chater – arrangement, mixing, production, sampling, songwriting
- Tony Diblasi – songwriting
- Edward Drennen – songwriting ("Let's Do the Latin Hustle" sample)
- Tony Espie – mixing
- Gordon McQuilten – piano, percussion, songwriting
- Darren Seltmann – arrangement, mixing, production, sampling, songwriting
- Jeanne Salo – songwriting ("Everyday" sample)
- Jimmy Webb – songwriting ("By the Time I Get to Phoenix" sample)

== Charts ==
Chart (2001)	Peak position
Australia (ARIA)	67
Ireland (IRMA)	29
Netherlands (Single Top 100)	97
Scotland Singles (Official Charts)	20
UK Singles (Official Charts)	16
UK Dance (Official Charts)	12
UK Indie (Official Charts)	2

== Certifications ==
Region	Certification	Certified units/sales
Australia (ARIA)	Platinum	70,000^{‡}
New Zealand (RMNZ)	Gold	15,000^{‡}
^{‡} Sales+streaming figures based on certification alone.
