= Ripe (Australian band) =

Australian pop music band

- Origin: Melbourne, Australia
- Genres: Pop, rock
- Years active: 1988–1998, 2005–2007
- Labels: Polyester; Shock; Beggars Banquet/Atlantic
- Past members: Tony Cleaver; Ewan McCartney; Peter Moran; Mark Murphy; Jo-Anne Roberts; Katie Dixon; Darren Seltmann; Matthew Whittle; Stephen Williams

Ripe were an Australian pop, rock music band formed in 1988 by Tony Cleaver on bass guitar, Ewan McCartney on drums, Peter Moran on lead guitar and Mark Murphy on lead vocals and guitar. By late 1992 Katie Dixon had joined on bass guitar and Darren Seltmann replaced McCartney on drums. They issued two studio albums, Filterfeed (1990) and The Plastic Hassle (1993). Ripe toured North America in 1994. Moran and Seltmann both left after that tour. Seltmann formed the Avalanches in 1997. Ripe had continued with Dixon and Murphy joined by new members but the group were inactive from 1998 until they issued an extended play, Galaxies and Stars (2006) and disbanded in the following year.

== History ==
Ripe were formed in Melbourne in 1988 as a pop music band by Tony Cleaver on bass guitar, Ewan McCartney on drums, Peter Moran on lead guitar and Mark Murphy on lead vocals and guitar. Australian musicologist Ian McFarlane described their sound, "mixed catchy bubblegum pop with fuzz-tone, serrated guitar melodies." The group's debut single, "We're All Trying to Get There", was released in 1989.

Ripe's debut studio album, Filterfeed, was issued in December 1990 via Melbourne-based label, Polyester. Cleaver was replaced in 1991 on bass guitar by Jo-Anne Roberts. They signed with Shock Records, which released their four-track extended play, Tough Guys Don't Dance, in March 1992, which was produced by Moran and Murphy. Roberts was replaced by Katie Dixon and later that year McCartney was replaced on drums by Darren Seltmann.

The Plastic Hassle (August 1993), their second studio album, was produced by Chris Thompson. It was praised by McFarlane as their "boldest statement" with its "noisy brand of post-modernist heavy metal akin to Sonic Youth." The group toured North America to promote its July 1994 re-issue via Beggars Banquet/Atlantic. Tom Demalon of AllMusic rated it at four-and-a-half out-of five stars, "fiercely melodic noise rock... for listeners desiring a glorious racket".

Moran and Seltmann left upon the group's return to Australia. Dixon and Murphy continued with new members from late 1996. Moran returned early the following year with Matthew Whittle joining on bass guitar but the group were inactive from 1998. Seltmann had formed the Avalanches in 1997.

Dixon, now also on vocals, and Murphy reformed Ripe with new members and issued a five-track EP, Galaxies and Stars, in May 2006 on Timberyard. The Age's Clem Bastow observed, "[it's] a remarkably full, and fulfilling, listen, from the luscious fade-in of the title track to the swirling garage psychedelia of closer".

== Members ==
- Tony Cleaver – bass guitar (1989–1991)
- Ewan McCartney – drums (1989–1992)
- Peter Moran – lead guitar (1989–1994, 1997–1998)
- Mark Murphy – lead vocals, guitar (1989–1998, 2005–2007)
- Jo-Anne Roberts – bass guitar (1991–1992)
- Katie Dixon – bass guitar, vocals (1992–1998, 2005–2007)
- Darren Seltmann – drums (1992–1994)
- Matthew Whittle – bass guitar (1997–1998)
- David Wookey - drums (1989); Keyboards & Samples (1991)
- Stephen Williams – keyboards (1989 -1991)

== Discography ==
=== Albums ===
- Filterfeed (December 1990) – Polyester (LUV 18)
- The Plastic Hassle (August 1993) – Shock
  - The Plastic Hassle (1994) – Beggars Banquet/Atlantic (92405)

=== Extended plays ===
- Tough Guys Don't Dance (March 1992) – Shock (SHOCK CD 8003)
- Galaxies and Stars (2006) – Shock/Timberyard (T80306CD)

=== Singles ===
- "We're All Trying to Get There" (1989) – Summershine
- "Spacesuit 4 2" (1990) – Polyester
- "The Most" (1992) – Shock
- "Moondriven" (1992) – Shock
- "Love Your Guts" (1993) – Shock
- "Something Fierce" (1993) – Shock
