= No Bad Memories =

Studio album by The Avalanches
- Released: 16 October 2026
- Length: 52:06
- Label: Modular
- Producer: The Avalanches

The Avalanches chronology
We Will Always Love You (2020)	No Bad Memories (2026)

Singles from No Bad Memories
- 1. "Together" Released: 14 May 2026; 2. "Every Single Weekend" Released: 1 June 2026; 3. "Blue Shadows" Released: 23 July 2026; 4. "Can't Get Over Losing You" Released: 6 August 2026; 5. "Far Away" Released: 8 September 2026; 6. "I Give Everything I Have 2 U" Released: 16 October 2026

No Bad Memories is the fourth studio album from the Australian electronic group The Avalanches, released on 16 October 2026 through Modular Recordings.

The album features guest appearances from artists including Rivers Cuomo, Panda Bear, Haruomi Hosono, Jessy Lanza, Karen O, Erick the Architect, Jamie xx, Ryoji Ikeda, Suzanne Ciani, Haley Joel Osment, Mike Patton and Carly Simon.

== Background ==
No Bad Memories was titled after an American 80's printed advertisement for 5¼-inch floppy disks.

According to a press release, No Bad Memories is "inspired by the simultaneously magical and insidious ways that advertising and name-brand technology wraps itself around our memories. An ambivalent ode to the nostalgic pull of commercial [j]ingles, proprietary start-up sounds, and long-forgotten audio logos. Revisiting imagery and jingles from childhood and realizing how profoundly they have stuck. Taking these sound sources from within the heart of this kinda corporate framework and flipping the fragments into our own kind of joyous pop music… Eventually we arrived at this world of No Bad Memories".

== Release ==
In May 2026, the duo launched an alternate reality game on social media centred around Takumi Digital Archives, a fictional company. Images and videos, one of which featured Haley Joel Osment, were posted advertising the company, which allows users to upload memories into digital storage. A website, takumiarchives.com, featured fictional vintage magazines and advertisements. The website also linked to a Wired article titled "Ads Implant False Memories" and a Psychology & Marketing publication titled "Make My Memory: How Advertising Can Change Our Memories of the Past".

The single "Together", featuring Nikki Nair, Jessy Lanza, and Prentiss, was released on 14 May 2026. An animated music video, featuring an anthropomorphic iPod and diskette dancing, was released alongside the single. "Every Single Weekend", featuring Jamie xx, was released on 1 June 2026 alongside a music video. The music video follows a model trying out for an ad for the fictional drink El Dorado. On 23 July 2026, the duo released the single "Blue Shadows", featuring Karen O. The duo announced the album and released its fourth single, "Can't Get Over Losing You", featuring Portraits of Tracy, on 6 August 2026.

On 8 September 2026, the group released the single "Far Away", featuring John Glacier and Khadija Al Hanafi. The single's music video was filmed in Tokyo and Minakami on a 2001 Sony Handycam in December 2025. On 1 October 2026, two remixes of "Together" by Frost Children and Baalti were released.

The group is scheduled to embark on a six-show Australian tour in 2027 in support of the album, with support from HAAi as an opener for the second half of the shows.

On 16 October 2026, the day of the album's release, a one-take music video for "I Give Everything I Have 2 U" was released. It stars the American actor Haley Joel Osment, who also lent his voice to several interlude tracks on the album.

== Artwork ==
The cover art is a 3D digital rendering created by Australian designer Jonathan Zawada.

== Critical reception ==
Professional ratings
Aggregate scores
Source	Rating
AnyDecentMusic?	7.8/10
Metacritic	83/100
Review scores
Source	Rating
AllMusic	4/5 stars
The Arts Desk	4/5 stars
Clash	9/10
DIY	5/5 stars
MusicOMH	3.5/5 stars
NME	3/5 stars
Paste	B
Pitchfork	8.2/10
Record Collector	5/5 stars
Slant Magazine	4.5/5 stars

According to the review aggregator Metacritic, No Bad Memories received "universal acclaim" based on a weighted average score of 83 out of 100 from 13 critic scores. Aggregator AnyDecentMusic? gave it 7.5 out of 10, based on their assessment of the critical consensus.

Matthew Horton of The Quietus described the album as "a delightful, if frenetic, technicolour wash". Jem Aswad of Variety wrote that it was "one of the happiest-sounding albums you'll hear all year" with "effervescent melodies and sounds, and combined with the energetic beats and humorous sound bites".

In a mixed review for NME, Patrick Clarke stated that "the album is excessive and overstimulating by design" but applauded that "th[e] overload of ideas [were] as good as pop music gets". Uncut writer Johnny Sharp said that No Bad Memories "is unashamedly music for the ADD generation...that approach can tantalise a little too much", but cited "Can't Get Over Losing You", "Every Single Weekend" and "Our Love Is Alive" as standout tracks.

== Track listing ==
All tracks are written by Robert Chater, Anthony Di Blasi and Andrew Szekeres (The Avalanches), except for "Bd-R". All additional writers are credited under the writers column.

All tracks are produced by The Avalanches. All other production personnel are credited under the producers column.

Digital version
No.	Title	Writer(s)	Producer(s)	Length
1.	"Bd-R"	Isao Tomita		0:41
2.	"Together" (featuring Nikki Nair, Jessy Lanza, and Prentiss)	Niketh Nair; Jessy Lanza; Henry Prentiss; Keith Hopwood; Malcolm Rowe		3:18
3.	"Xerox Altalink B8055" (featuring Ryoji Ikeda)	Ryoji Ikeda	Ryoji Ikeda	0:18
4.	"I Give Everything I Have 2 U" (featuring Loaded Honey)	J Lloyd; Lydia Kitto	J Lloyd; Lydia Kitto	1:37
5.	"Every Single Weekend" (featuring Jamie xx)	Jamie Smith; Leroy Burgess; James J. Calloway; Sonny T. Davenport; Gilberto Gil; M. Levy; M. Casartelli	Jamie xx	2:10
6.	"Friends Forever"			0:27
7.	"Blue Shadows" (featuring Karen O)	Karen O; Celso Valli; Antonino Cocco; Hugo Vereker		2:40
8.	"Logoland"			0:25
9.	"Like Clockwork / Hit by Traffic" (featuring Khadija Al Hanafi)	Khadija Al Hanafi	Khadija Al Hanafi	1:36
10.	"All the Time in the World" (featuring Rivers Cuomo, Vegyn, and Baby Marlboro)	Rivers Cuomo; Joseph Thornalley; Nathan Jean Demonii Bismuth; B. De Aquino; Jack Nitzsche; Jackie DeShannon	Vegyn; Nick Ward	3:08
11.	"3D Glasses Not Included"	Erik Wiegand; Lynn DeFino; Roxanna Ward		0:32
12.	"Vida" (featuring Erick the Architect)	Erick Elliott; Paulo Jerónimo; Jorge Washington		2:11
13.	"Paradise Island" (featuring Khadija Al Hanafi and Mike Patton)	Khadija Al Hanafi; James Burke	Khadija Al Hanafi	0:27
14.	"Unicorn Quest" (featuring Ryoji Ikeda)	Ryoji Ikeda	Ryoji Ikeda	0:43
15.	"Far Away" (featuring John Glacier and Khadija Al Hanafi)	Khadija Al Hanafi; John Glacier; Doug Firebaugh	Khadija Al Hanafi	2:37
16.	"He Lives in the Old World"			1:02
17.	"Can't Get Over Losing You" (featuring Portraits of Tracy)	Tracy Geneviève Amare; Wilson Williams	Portraits of Tracy	2:49
18.	"Watch Out! It's Cloudy" (featuring Khadija Al Hanafi)	Khadija Al Hanafi		0:40
19.	"Highfield" (featuring Panda Bear)	Noah Lennox; Vini Reilly		2:23
20.	"El Dorado TV Spot" (featuring Haley Joel Osment)			0:39
21.	"Under Yr Power"	Bill Jacocks		1:23
22.	"SUV Heaven" (featuring Khadija Al Hanafi)	Khadija Al Hanafi; Karen Manno; Jeff Franzel; Jonathan Rosen	Khadija Al Hanafi	0:27
23.	"One More Fantasy" (featuring Carly Simon)	Carly Simon		1:59
24.	"Break Out Corporate Tag" (featuring Ryoji Ikeda and Portraits of Tracy)	Ryoji Ikeda; Tracy Geneviève Amare	Ryoji Ikeda	0:19
25.	"Magic Wand" (featuring Barry Can't Swim)	Joshua Mainnie; Jérôme Lenoir	Barry Can't Swim	2:25
26.	"Superfun! TV Spot" (featuring Mike Patton and Haley Joel Osment)	Mike Patton	Jamie xx	0:34
27.	"No Bad Memories"	Jim Spencer; Ed Tossing		1:54
28.	"Our Love Is Alive" (featuring Suzanne Ciani and Barry Can't Swim)	Joshua Mainnie; Matthew James Aitken; Peter Alan Waterman; Mike Stock	Barry Can't Swim	3:26
29.	"Total Recall" (featuring Mike Patton)	Mike Patton		3:44
30.	"Final Credits (Loaded Honey Version)" (featuring Loaded Honey)	J Lloyd; Lydia Kitto	J Lloyd; Lydia Kitto	3:18
31.	"The Pavements Light" (featuring Haruomi Hosono)	Haruomi Hosono; Johnny Mercer; Hoagy Carmichael	Haruomi Hosono	2:14
Total length:				52:06

Physical release
No.	Title	Writer(s)	Producer(s)	Length
16.	"Our Love Is Alive" (featuring Suzanne Ciani and Barry Can't Swim)	Joshua Mainnie; Matthew James Aitken; Peter Alan Waterman; Mike Stock	Barry Can't Swim	2:22
17.	"Evergreen Altar" (featuring Vegyn)	Joseph Thornalley; I. Hayes; A. Pointer; B. Pointer; J. Pointer	Vegyn	2:24
Total length:				44:55

=== Notes ===
- "Unicorn Quest" is stylised as "Unicorn Quest™"
- "Superfun! TV Spot" is stylised as "Superfun!™ TV Spot"
- Physical editions omit the tracks "He Lives in the Old World", "El Dorado TV Spot", "Total Recall", and "Final Credits (Loaded Honey Version)", and include an exclusive track titled "Evergreen Altar". "Our Love Is Alive" is moved from track 28 on to track 16 and is shortened to a duration of 2:22.

=== Samples ===
- "Bd-R" samples "Arabesque No. 1", arranged and performed by Isao Tomita.
- "Together" samples "Together Again", written by Keith Hopwood and Malcolm Rowe.
- "Xerox Altalink B8055" samples "Botellharpa", written and performed by Lechuga Zafiro.
- "I Give Everything I Have 2 U" and "Final Credits (Loaded Honey Version)" both sample "How Could It Be" by The Esquires, written by Gilbert Moorer.
- "Every Single Weekend" samples "Axé Baba" performed by Gilberto Gil; "Barely Breaking Even (Club Mix)" as performed by Louie Vega, Leroy Burgess and The Universal Robot Band. Written by Burgess, James J. Calloway and Sonny T. Davenport; and "Darling" performed by All Trouveé, written by M. Levy and M. Cassartelli.
- "Blue Shadows" samples "Shadows from Nowhere" as performed by The Blue Gas, written by Celso Valli, Antonino Cocco and Hugh Vereker.
- "All the Time in the World" samples "By Your Side" by Baby Marlboro; "Pra Que Chorar" as performed by Os Cariocas, written by B. De Aquino; and "Baby That's Me" as performed by The Cake, written by Jack Nitzsche and Jackie DeShannon.
- "3D Glasses Not Included" samples "My Party" by Errorsmith, written by Erik Wiegand; "Remember Who You Are" performed by Norman Connors, written by Lynn DeFino and Roxanna Ward.
- "Vida" samples "Vida Agitada" as performed by Paulo Jerónimo, written by Jerónimo and Jorge Washington.
- "Paradise Island" samples "Theme of Angels" by The Five Stairsteps, written by James Burke.
- "Far Away" samples "Empty Canvasses" written and performed by Doug Firebaugh.
- "Can't Get Over Losing You" samples "I Can't Get Used to Losing You", written by Wilson Williams.
- "Highfield" samples "Highfield Choir" performed by The Durutti Column, written by V. Reilly.
- "Under Yr Power" samples "Questions (Pt. 1)" performed by Pat Stallworth, written by Bill Jacocks.
- "SUV Heaven" samples "Waiting for the Last Tear to Fall" recorded by Phyllis Hyman, written by Karen Manno, Jeff Franzel and Jonathan Rosen.
- "One More Fantasy" samples "Make Me Feel Something" as recorded by Carly Simon, written by C. Simon.
- "Magic Wand" samples "Nothing From Nothing (Something From Nothing Is Everything)" performed by Renee Acker, written by Jérôme Lenoir.
- "No Bad Memories" samples "Wrap Myself Up In Your Love" performed by Angie Jaree, written by Jim Spencer and Ed Tossing.
- "Our Love Is Alive" samples "The Heaven I Need" by The Three Degrees, written by M. Aitken, P. Waterman and M. Stock.
- "The Pavements Light" samples "Skylark" performed by The Hi-Lo's, written by Hoagy Carmichael and Johnny Mercer.
- "Evergreen Altar" samples "Easy Days" performed by The Pointer Sisters, written by I. Hayes, A. Pointer, B. Pointer and J. Pointer.

== Personnel ==
Credits are adapted from Tidal.

=== The Avalanches ===
- Robert Chater – Executive producer, mixing
- Anthony Di Blasi – producer, mix supervisor
- Andrew Szekeres – producer

=== Musicians ===
- Jessy Lanza – vocals (2)
- Prentiss – vocals (2)
- Lydia Kitto – vocals (4, 30)
- MUSYCA Children's Choir – additional vocals (5)
- Karen O – vocals (7)
- Khadija Al Hanafi – vocals (9, 13)
- Rivers Cuomo – vocals (10)
- Erick the Architect – vocals (12)
- Mike Patton – vocals (13, 29)
- John Glacier – vocals (15)
- Portraits of Tracy – vocals (17, 24)
- Panda Bear – vocals (19)
- Haley Joel Osment – vocals (20)
- Suzanne Ciani – vocals (28)

=== Technical ===
- Nikki Nair – additional production (2)
- Joe LaPorta – mastering
- Tony Espie – mix supervisor
- Johnathan Zawada – artwork

== Charts ==
Chart performance for No Bad Memories
Chart (2026)	Peak position
Australian Albums (ARIA)	5
Belgian Albums (Ultratop Flanders)	101
Belgian Albums (Ultratop Wallonia)	55
French Albums (SNEP)	196
German Albums (Offizielle Top 100)	89
Japanese Albums (Oricon)	57
Japanese Dance & Soul Albums (Oricon)	3
Japanese Digital Albums (Oricon)	50
Japanese Download Albums (Billboard Japan)	44
Japanese Top Albums Sales (Billboard Japan)	79
Scottish Albums (Official Charts)	13
UK Albums (Official Charts)	60
UK Dance Albums (Official Charts)	1
US Top Album Sales (Billboard)	14
US Top Dance Albums (Billboard)	5
