= Can't Get Over Losing You =

Single by the Avalanches featuring Portraits of Tracy

from the album No Bad Memories
- Released: 6 August 2026
- Recorded: 2024–2025
- Genre: Chillwave; nu-disco
- Length: 2:50
- Label: Modular
- Songwriters: Portraits of Tracy; Robbie Chater; Tony Di Blasi; Andrew Szekeres; Wilson Williams
- Producer: the Avalanches

the Avalanches singles chronology
| "Blue Shadows" (2026) | "Can't Get Over Losing You" (2026) | "Far Away" (2026) |

Music video
- "Can't Get Over Losing You" on YouTube

"Can't Get Over Losing You" is a song by Australian electronic music group the Avalanches featuring Portraits of Tracy. The song was released as the fourth single from their fourth studio album, No Bad Memories (2026), on 6 August 2026 at the same time the album was officially announced.

== Background ==
Both artists had high compliments for each other. Chater praised Tracy, calling the musician a "hilarious, brave and tender human being" whose "production and mixing is insane", yet eclipsed by her vocals and songwriting. Tracy said, "Working with the Avalanches was such an awesome experience! I don’t find myself collaborating too often with peeps, but as soon as we connected it felt just right. We started the song in 2024 & finished it in 2025, and now she just sounds lovely!".

== Composition ==
The song has been described as chillwave and nu-disco.

== Music video ==
An animated music video, directed by Jonathan Zawada, was released alongside the single.

== Reception ==
The song received extremely positive reviews from critics. Consequence of Sound called the song "jubilant" and said it "combines punchy drums with ethereal vocals from Tracy, who also contributed melodies to the track". BroadwayWorld described the song as having "garage rock drums" with "nostalgic samples and euphoric melodies" while also "intimate, haunting". NME also noted its garage rock drums and its "euphoric melodies", additionally calling the song "lively", "joyous", and "upbeat".
