= Frontier Psychiatrist =

Single by The Avalanches

from the album Since I Left You
- Released: 21 August 2000
- Recorded: 1999
- Genre: Turntablism; plunderphonics; experimental hip hop; trip hop
- Length: 4:47
- Label: Modular; XL; Elektra
- Songwriters: Robbie Chater; Tony Diblasi; Dexter Fabay; Bert Kaempfert; Gordon McQuilten; Herbert Rehbein; Darren Seltmann; Carl Sigman
- Producers: Robbie Chater; Darren Seltmann

The Avalanches singles chronology
"Electricity" (1999)	"Frontier Psychiatrist" (2000)	"Since I Left You" (2001)

"Frontier Psychiatrist" is a song by Australian electronic music group The Avalanches. It was released on 21 August 2000 as the second single from the group's debut album Since I Left You. Produced by Avalanches members Robbie Chater and Darren Seltmann, under their production alias Bobbydazzler, the track is built around many sampled elements, much like other tracks from its parent album. Samples include prominent vocal samples of the sketch "Frontier Psychiatrist" by comedy duo Wayne and Shuster, and an orchestral background sourced from an Enoch Light version of the composition "My Way of Life" (1968).

Upon release, it peaked at number 18 on the UK Singles Chart and number 49 in the group's native Australia, becoming their first single to enjoy commercial success. "Frontier Psychiatrist" was well received by music critics, who praised the Avalanches' use of samples.

== Background ==
According to group members, "Frontier Psychiatrist" was not planned beforehand by the group and in their words, "happened from us just messing around." Group members Robbie Chater and Darren Seltmann were driving figures in the production of the album, spending months scouring Melbourne's "old record stores for old records" and spending hours sampling music from the records they found to create. The duo primarily worked with a Yamaha Promix 01 and Akai S2000 samplers. Dexter Fabay, turntablist and keyboardist for the band, brainstormed the idea for "Frontier Psychiatrist", and his scratching is heard prominently on the track.

== Composition ==
"Frontier Psychiatrist" is built around several elements sampled from other music; Chater and Seltmann, who produced the track, sampled music from several vinyl records in the production and creation of Since I Left You. The track also makes prominent use of scratching done by the band's turntablist Dexter Fabay.

The prominent orchestral sample heard throughout the track is sourced from a recording by the Enoch Light Singers of the 1968 composition "My Way of Life", originally composed by Bert Kaempfert, Herbert Rehbein and Carl Sigman.

The track also contains several vocal samples of Canadian comedy duo Wayne and Shuster, the most prominent of these samples taken from the duo's comedy routine "Frontier Psychiatrist", as well as the John Waters movie Polyester.

Only the aforementioned three samples are credited in the liner notes of Since I Left You; various other uncredited samples are used in the track, with sources ranging from Harvey Mandel's 1968 cover of the spiritual "Wade in the Water" and comedy routines by Flip Wilson, to sketches from Sesame Street and Maurice Jarre's main theme from Lawrence of Arabia.

The closing mariachi band plays "El Negro Zumbón", first performed by Flo Sandon's, who doubles Silvana Mangano in the 1951 movie Anna.

== Critical reception ==
Critics acclaimed "Frontier Psychiatrist". Marc Savlov of The Austin Chronicle said it was "hands down the best example of the sheer giddy pleasure of turntablist art you've likely ever heard." Matt LeMay of Pitchfork described the track as "one of the funniest songs I've heard in ages", praising its vocal samples, including "brilliant scratching on a sample of a parrot". Christine Hsieh of PopMatters wrote: "Most impressively, though, is the way the Avalanches make things like whinnying horses and spoken word sound kooky and fresh instead of recycled and stale." She cited "Frontier Psychiatrist" as a "perfect example of this aesthetic". Matthew Horton, writing for the book 1001 Songs You Must Hear Before You Die, described it as "the album [Since I Left You] in microcosm—busy, daft, composed of countless unconnected parts, yet somehow entirely natural as a whole."

"Frontier Psychiatrist" and Soulwax's "No Fun / Push It" were the subjects of a short essay written by English writer Nick Hornby as a part of his book Songbook, a collection of short essays on tracks with particular emotional resonance to Hornby.

In 2025, the song placed 58 on the Triple J Hottest 100 of Australian Songs.

== Music video ==
The "Frontier Psychiatrist" music video, directed by Tom Kuntz and Mike Maguire, features characters re-enacting and musicians playing elements of the track, including vocal samples, violins, horns, serpents and drums.

The video was released to critical acclaim. It was the runner-up in the "Best Music Video" category at the 2002 Rushes Soho Shorts Film Festival. Pitchfork Media placed the video at No. 19 on their list of the "Top 50 Music Videos of the 2000s".

An alternative video was made, featuring actors acting out the "dialogue" of the track in various scenes, including a psychiatrist's office and "Dexter's" bedroom. In addition, Rorschach ink-blots are animated to reflect various samples in the track.

== Release ==
"Frontier Psychiatrist" was released as the album's second single on 21 August 2000. Tracks included on "Frontier Psychiatrist" singles in Australia and the United Kingdom included remixes of "Frontier Psychiatrist" by Mario Caldato, Jr., "With My Baby", "Slow Walking" and "Yamaha Superstar", the latter two having been previously released on the Avalanches' 1997 single "Undersea Community". The single peaked at number 18 on the UK Singles Chart on the week ending 21 July 2001 and peaked at number 49 in Australia on the week ending 15 October 2000. In the United States, "Frontier Psychiatrist" was released on 6 November 2001 as the group's debut single.

Various promotional DVD singles containing the music video were also released.

CD single (Australia)

1. "Frontier Psychiatrist" – 4:47
2. "With My Baby" – 4:38
3. "Frontier Psychiatrist" (Mario Caldato's 85% Mix) – 4:00
4. "Frontier Psychiatrist" (85% Instrumental) – 4:03

12-inch single (United Kingdom)

Side one
1. "Frontier Psychiatrist" – 4:47
Side two
1. "Frontier Psychiatrist" (Mario Caldato's 85% Mix) – 4:00
2. "Frontier Psychiatrist" (85% Instrumental) – 4:03

CD single 1 (United Kingdom)

1. "Frontier Psychiatrist" (radio edit) – 4:09
2. "Slow Walking" – 3:45
3. "Yamaha Superstar" – 1:53

CD single 2 (United Kingdom)

1. "Frontier Psychiatrist" – 4:47
2. "Frontier Psychiatrist" (Mario Caldato's 85% Mix) – 4:04
3. "Frontier Psychiatrist" (85% Instrumental) – 4:02

== Credits and personnel ==
Personnel

- Bobbydazzler (aka Robbie Chater and Darren Seltmann) – producer, mixing, arrangement
- Robbie Chater – arrangement, producer, songwriter, mixing, Yamaha Promix 01 and Akai S2000 samplers
- Tony Diblasi – songwriter
- Dexter Fabay – songwriter, turntables
- Bert Kaempfert – songwriter
- Mike Marsh (aka Mike's) – mastering
- Gordon McQuilten – songwriter
- Herbert Rehbein – songwriter
- Darren Seltmann – arrangement, producer, songwriter, mixing, Yamaha Promix 01 and Akai S2000 samplers
- Carl Sigman – songwriter

Credits adapted from CD single liner notes and Since I Left You liner notes.

== Charts ==
Chart (2001)	Peak position
Australia (ARIA)	49
UK Singles (Official Charts)	18

== Certifications ==
Region	Certification	Certified units/sales
Australia (ARIA)	Platinum	70,000^{‡}
^{‡} Sales+streaming figures based on certification alone.
