= Since I Left You =

Studio album by The Avalanches
- Released: 27 November 2000
- Recorded: 1999 – February 2000
- Studios: Softlight Bistro and Wow Sound, Melbourne; Westfalia Beachhouse, Sorrento
- Genres: Dance; sampledelia; disco; plunderphonics; art pop
- Length: 60:39
- Labels: Modular; XL; Sire
- Producers: Robbie Chater; Darren Seltmann

The Avalanches chronology
El Producto (1997)	Since I Left You (2000)	Wildflower (2016)

Singles from Since I Left You
- 1. "Electricity" Released: 13 September 1999; 2. "Frontier Psychiatrist" Released: 21 August 2000; 3. "Since I Left You" Released: 5 February 2001; 4. "Radio" Released: 23 July 2001

Since I Left You is the debut studio album by Australian electronic music group The Avalanches, released on 27 November 2000 by Modular Recordings. It was produced by group members Robbie Chater and Darren Seltmann (under the pseudonym Bobbydazzler), and samples extensively from various genres. The album was recorded and produced at two separate, near-identical studios by Chater and Seltmann, exchanging audio mixes of records they sampled.

After the album's positive reception in Australia, the duo considered an international release – its date was held back until 2001 in the United Kingdom and North America and appeared in slightly altered forms. The delay and changes occurred so that the group could obtain permission to use the samples or use replacements. Four singles were released from the album: "Electricity", "Frontier Psychiatrist", "Since I Left You", and "Radio". The group promoted the album by organising headlining tours in Australia, Europe and the United States.

Since I Left You was acclaimed by critics. It peaked in the top 30 on the ARIA Albums Chart, number 12 in Norway, number eight on the UK Albums Chart and, in the United States, at number ten on the Top Electronic Albums chart and in the top 40 on the Top Heatseekers chart. At the ARIA Music Awards of 2001, it won in four categories: Breakthrough Artist – Album, Best Dance Release, Producer of the Year for Bobbydazzler, and Breakthrough Artist – Single for "Frontier Psychiatrist". Since I Left You became one of the best-reviewed albums of the 2000s, and was listed at number ten in the book 100 Best Australian Albums.

== Production ==
The Avalanches began work on the album in 1999 under the working title Pablo's Cruise, primarily working with a Yamaha Promix 01 and Akai S2000 samplers. Group members Darren Seltmann and Robbie Chater spent hours sampling music from vinyl records to create the songs on the album: Chater has estimated that there are over 3,500 samples that were used overall, although some estimate the number to be much lower, roughly 900. After sampling and arranging, the pair would swap their tapes, listen to each other's ideas, and expand on whatever they had heard. Despite working separately, both Chater and Seltmann had nearly identical studio set-ups.

Initially, Seltmann and Chater were not planning for an international release. They were not concerned with copyright restrictions and so did not keep a list of which tracks were being sampled. According to Chater, they "were really unorganised and were just sampling on the fly as tracks progressed ... We had no idea the record would get such a wide-scale release so we saw no need to keep track of what we were using – we were definitely guilty of harbouring a 'No-one's going to listen to it anyway' sort of attitude." The sources span many different styles of music, sampling artists such as Françoise Hardy, Blowfly, Sérgio Mendes, Raekwon, Wayne and Shuster, and Madonna. Seltmann felt that "[t]he more rejected and unwanted the record that a sample comes from, the more appealing it is, I guess it's almost a reaction to rare record finding, but occasionally things like 'Holiday' come up". He described how making sample tapes for each other created some samples which were intended as "funny samples" that they had no original intention to get clearance for. In particular, Madonna's song "Holiday" was "one of those where we put something together, ended it with "Holiday" and all had a big laugh. It ended up where we couldn't live without it so I guess we just had to make that one work". Later, Seltmann and Chater had a few problems when trying to clear all the samples. One sample that had to be removed was from Rodgers and Hammerstein in the intro that featured harps and girls singing. After checking clearances, "[t]he album is slightly different to its original form in that it had a whole new introduction, which apparently was really recognisable, so we had to take that off straight away". The Avalanches worked with sample-clearance expert Pat Shannahan to clear the thousands of samples in the record. The group played their songs to flatmates to get input on which tracks were worth including on the album. "Electricity" was the first song the group felt that worked; it was a last-minute addition to the album as The Avalanches felt the song "still sounds good". In February 2000, Seltmann (as Dazzler) and Chater (as Bobby C) finished production on the album under the pseudonym Bobbydazzler, and its official title was revealed as Since I Left You in March 2000.

== Style and themes ==
Since I Left You was originally developed to be a concept album. Chater described its initial theme as a love story, "an international search for love from country to country. The idea of a guy following a girl around the world and always being one port behind. And that was just because we had all these records from all over the world, and we'd like to use all that stuff." The idea was ultimately abandoned when the group felt they should not make their themes too obvious. The album's sound was in response to dance music at that time, that Chater felt was "about big drums, big production: think of a record like the Chemical Brothers' 'Block Rockin' Beats', with those amazing drums, and how huge those records sounded". The group felt their early music could not compare to that sound and desired a recording with less bass that was influenced by 1960s music such as the Beach Boys and Phil Spector.

== Release ==
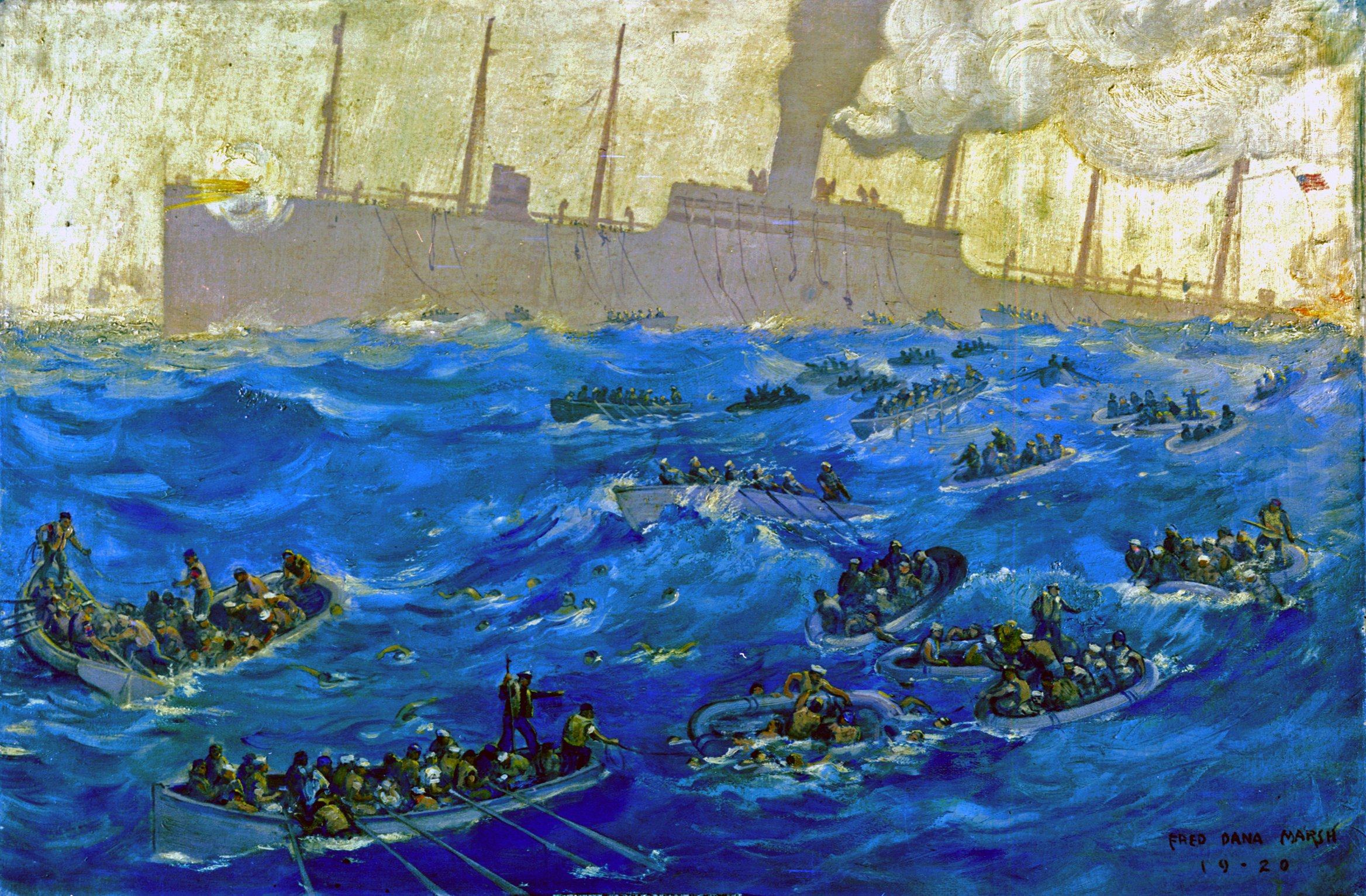
The Sinking of the USS President Lincoln by Frederick Dana Marsh

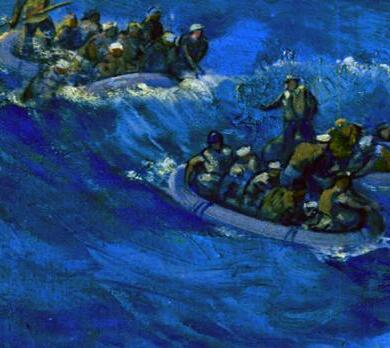
The excerpt of The Sinking of the USS President Lincoln used by the cover of Since I Left You (the lower-right of the painting, cropped and flipped horizontally)

When Since I Left You was being recorded, The Avalanches had trouble choosing songs to be released as singles, finding them not sounding as good outside the context of the album. On 13 September 1999, they issued "Electricity" as a four-track 12" vinyl single in Australia (on Modular Recordings) and as a two-track 7" vinyl single in the United Kingdom (on Rex Records). Chater felt that Modular was very patient with the group releasing the record. On 21 August 2000, "Frontier Psychiatrist" was released as the second single from the album by Modular in Australia in both a four-track and two-track version. The initial release date for Since I Left You was going to be 11 September; however, it was delayed due to issues with sample clearance. On 27 November, the album was issued in Australia with plans to have a worldwide release in early 2001. The later release date outside Australia was due to additional sample clearances needed for international markets. To celebrate the album's release in Melbourne, the group had a boat cruise party through Port Phillip Bay. On 5 February 2001, they released the album's title track as the third single in Australia, and followed on 23 July with "Radio".

In April, Since I Left You was released in the UK through XL Recordings with the album selling far more copies than the label's original target amount. On 28 April, it entered the UK Album Charts, which peaked at number eight and remained in the chart for 25 weeks. In late March, the single "Since I Left You" was issued in the UK and entered the charts at number 16 on 7 April 2001. On 6 November, Since I Left You was released in the United States by Sire Records, and charted on the US Top Electronic Albums, peaking at number ten, and on the Top Heatseekers chart, peaking at number 31. The album artwork features an excerpt of Sinking of USS President Lincoln by Fred Dana Marsh (1920).

=== Versions ===
Several versions of the album were created due to sample clearance difficulties.

In 2000, Zomba Records released a promo CD of an earlier version of the album containing all original samples and an extra track after "Stay Another Season" titled "With My Baby", which also appeared as a B-side on the "Frontier Psychiatrist" single in Australia.

For the first international release, multiple samples had to be cut from the original Australian release, including dialogue by Robert De Niro from the film Midnight Run, an Ennio Morricone excerpt, and flute sounds from War's "H2 Overture". A version of "Frontier Psychiatrist" with re-recorded vocal lines instead of samples was also included on this release; the original was restored on later releases. A mixtape named Gimix was sold as tour merch in 2000, designed to combat bootlegged copies of the album which were circulating due to the album's publishing delays. The mixtape contains tracks from Since I Left You, songs sampled on the album, songs with copyright clearance problems, and other favorites of the group.

In July 2011, a deluxe reissue of Since I Left You was announced that would include the original album as well as a bonus disc containing b-sides, demo tracks and remixes of songs from the original album by artists including El Guincho, MF Doom, Black Dice, and The Avalanches themselves. In 2016, it was announced that a reissue of Since I Left You would be released on 27 January 2017 in a limited edition of five thousand copies. Fans were allowed to vote on which colour vinyl the album would be pressed on, as well as which record store the album would be sold at. In December 2017, some retailers listed a 33-track deluxe edition of the album online. The deluxe edition features alternate artwork and a collection of new remixes from MF Doom, Deakin, Leon Vynehall, Canyons, Sinkane, Sun Araw, Black Dice, and Edan alongside select previously released remixes, and the original demo of Thank You Caroline. In November 2018, the band promised the deluxe edition was "nearly ready". The deluxe edition (now named the 20th Anniversary Edition) finally released on June 4, 2021.

=== Tour ===
To promote Since I Left You, The Avalanches organised their first Australian head-lining tour in October 2000, planning to head to all the capital cities. All dates on the tour were sold out. In their Brisbane show, Seltmann broke his leg in an on-stage collision with bass guitarist and singer Tony Di Blasi. From January to February 2001, The Avalanches toured with the Big Day Out festival in Australia, visiting four capital cities. While on tour in Europe, Seltmann broke his other leg, thereafter the rest of the tour's shows were DJ sets. The British dance music magazine Muzik awarded The Avalanches as best live act.

== Critical reception ==
Professional ratings
Aggregate scores
Source	Rating
Metacritic	89/100
Review scores
Source	Rating
AllMusic	5/5 stars
Alternative Press	8/10
Entertainment Weekly	B
The Guardian	4/5 stars
NME	9/10
Pitchfork	9.5/10
Q	4/5 stars
Rolling Stone	3.5/5 stars
The Rolling Stone Album Guide	4/5 stars
Spin	9/10

Seltmann and Chater did not initially think that Since I Left You would receive much attention. However, the album garnered widespread critical acclaim from the music industry. At Metacritic, which assigns a normalised rating out of 100 to reviews from mainstream critics, it received an average score of 89, based on 21 reviews. It became one of the best reviewed albums of 2000, as well as being the highest rated dance album on that site. The album peaked in the top 30 on the ARIA Albums Chart and number 12 in Norway on the VG-lista Top 40 Albums Chart. At the ARIA Music Awards of 2001, The Avalanches won four awards from nine nominations, including Breakthrough Artist – Album, Best Dance Release and Producer of the Year (for Chater and Seltmann aka Bobbydazzler) for Since I Left You. The fourth award win was for the related single "Frontier Psychiatrist" as Breakthrough Artist – Single.

Christian Ward of NME hailed it as "a joyous, kaleidoscopic masterpiece of sun-kissed disco-pop", and Andy Battaglia from The A.V. Club called it "a psychedelic disco fry-up", while Andy Kellman of AllMusic called it one of the most intimate and emotional dance records that is not vocal-based. Marc Savlov of The Austin Chronicle found the album as surprising as "Primal Scream's life-changing Screamadelica was a decade ago. It's downright shocking how fun this is". Pitchfork's Matt LeMay credited The Avalanches for developing a "unique context" for the songs without compromising their original "distinct flavor" and said that the album "sounds like nothing else" because of how the samples are employed rather than their quality or volume. Q magazine's Gareth Grundy remarked that its clever music is delivered as engagingly as "more conventional dance sounds" and that the album "finally fulfils sampling's original promise" of producing new, extraordinary sounds from artfully appropriated pieces of existing songs. Amy Bell of Drowned in Sound praised it as one of the year's best albums.

Robert Christgau of The Village Voice was less enthusiastic and said that The Avalanches deliver "the long-promised new-songs-from-old-songs trick, in which untrackable samples are stitched together until they mesh into compelling music that never existed before. Unfortunately, the music in question is string-section disco." Stylus Magazine's Tyler Martin felt that the tracks lack innovation, nuance, and rhythmic complexity, but that several of them are exceptional. The website later placed the album at number 16 on their list of top 50 albums from 2000 to 2005. In a retrospective review for The New Rolling Stone Album Guide, Michaelangelo Matos praised The Avalanches' balance of "the familiar and obscure" through their sampling techniques and their "playful, airy grooves", as well as the album's "surprisingly resonant emotional core".

=== Accolades ===
Since I Left You was placed in some year-end polls. Pitchfork placed Since I Left You at number three in their top twenty albums of 2001 poll and number 10 on their list of top 200 albums of the 2000s, declaring the album "a masterpiece of mood-setting that riffs off an ideal where getting on an airplane and landing in another corner of the world was the most exotic thing a person could do." Q listed it as one of the best 50 albums of 2001. The album was voted the 11th best album of the year in The Village Voice's annual Pazz & Jop critics poll for 2001. In 2008, the Australian newspaper The Age assembled a panel of experts ranging from its own critics and music journalists to musicians, broadcasters, record shop owners and band managers to pick a list of definitive fifty Australian albums. Since I Left You was included on this list with Chris Johnston declaring the album to be "a beautiful piece of musical art made entirely from samples." Since I Left You was placed at number six on The Daily Telegraph's list of "50 most influential Australian albums ever". Resident Advisor declared it to be the seventh best album of the decade. NOW Toronto called the album a "sampledelic classic".

On Slant Magazine's "Best of the Aughts" list, the album was placed at number six out of 100. Reflecting on the album's reception, Chater felt it was well received because "It's light-hearted and fun to listen to and there is depth there as well. There are some sadder moments that I think has made it resonate and made it last. It does sound like a 23-year-old kid in his bedroom making a record to me, but you can hear that innocence and joy in the discovery of finding all those sounds. So that was kind of infectious for people." In October 2010, it was listed at No. 10 in the book, 100 Best Australian Albums. Philip Sherburne, writing for Rhapsody, said that "along with DJ Shadow's Endtroducing, this is one of plunderphonic music's greatest LPs". The album was also included in the book 1001 Albums You Must Hear Before You Die. In 2019, the album was ranked 34th on The Guardian's 100 Best Albums of the 21st Century list. In December of 2021, the album was listed at no. 8 in Rolling Stone Australia's '200 Greatest Albums of All Time' countdown.

== Track listing ==
Where appropriate, the writers of the sampled material are credited alongside The Avalanches' members.

Since I Left You track listing
No.	Title	Writer(s)	Length
1.	"Since I Left You"	Robbie Chater; Tony Di Blasi; Gordon McQuilten; Darren Seltmann; Edward Drennen; Jeanne Salo; Jimmy Webb	4:22
2.	"Stay Another Season"	Chater; Di Blasi; McQuilten; Seltmann; Alan Bergman; Marilyn Bergman; Johnny Mandel; Curtis Hudson; Lisa Stevens	2:18
3.	"Radio"	Chater; Seltmann; Claude Cave	4:22
4.	"Two Hearts in 3/4 Time"	Chater; Di Blasi; McQuilten; Seltmann; John Cale; Marlena Shaw	3:23
5.	"Avalanche Rock"	Chater; Seltmann	0:22
6.	"Flight Tonight"	Chater; Seltmann; Henry Lawes; Billy Rowe; Paul Huston; David Jolicoeur; Vincent Mason; Kelvin Mercer; Lawrence Dermer; Hubert Roberts; Henry Stone; Freddy Stonewall	3:53
7.	"Close to You"	Chater; Seltmann; August Darnell; Ernest Isley; Marvin Isley; O'Kelly Isley, Jr.; Ronald Isley; Rudolph Isley; Christopher Jasper	3:54
8.	"Diners Only"	Chater; Seltmann; Saladine Wallace; Salahadeen Wilds; David Willis	1:35
9.	"A Different Feeling"	Chater; Di Blasi; McQuilten; Seltmann; Raymond Evans; Jay Livingston	4:22
10.	"Electricity"	Chater; Seltmann; Willie Clarke; Clarence Reid	3:29
11.	"Tonight May Have To Last Me All My Life (Note: Also known as "Tonight" on the album's back cover and streaming services)"	Chater; Seltmann; Donald Borzage; Johnny Mercer	2:20
12.	"Pablo's Cruise"	Chater; Seltmann	0:52
13.	"Frontier Psychiatrist"	Chater; Di Blasi; McQuilten; Seltmann; Dexter Fabay; Bert Kaempfert; Herbert Rehbein; Carl Sigman	4:47
14.	"ETOH"	Chater; Seltmann	5:02
15.	"Summer Crane"	Chater; Seltmann; Bobby Lee Trammell	4:39
16.	"Little Journey"	Chater; Seltmann; Hudson; Stevens; John Phillips	1:35
17.	"Live at Dominoes"	Chater; Seltmann; Frank Farian; Fred Jay; George Reyam	5:39
18.	"Extra Kings"	Chater; Seltmann; Trammell; Alan Osmond; Merrill Osmond; Wayne Osmond	3:46
Total length:			60:39

20th anniversary deluxe edition disc 2 – digital and vinyl tracks
No.	Title	Length
1.	"Since I Left You" (Cornelius remix)	5:35
2.	"Tonight May Have to Last Me All My Life" (Edan remix)	3:53
3.	"Frontier Psychiatrist" (Mario Caldato Jr.'s 85% remix)	4:04
4.	"Close to You" (Sun Araw remix)	6:10
5.	"Since I Left You" (Stereolab remix)	4:36
6.	"Flight Tonight" (Canyons Travel Agent dub)	6:00
7.	"Radio" (Sinkane remix)	8:33
8.	"Since I Left You" (Prince Paul remix)	3:48
9.	"Electricity" (Harvey's Nightclub re-edit)	6:30
10.	"Summer Crane" (Black Dice remix)	3:38
11.	"Extra Kings" (Deakin remix)	4:42
12.	"Tonight May Have to Last Me All My Life" (MF Doom remix)	2:54
13.	"Tonight May Have to Last Me All My Life" (Dragged by Leon Vynehall)	5:24
14.	"A Different Feeling" (Carl Craig's Paperclip People remix)	10:37
15.	"Thank You Caroline" (original Avalanches demo tape)	4:11
Total length:		80:35

20th anniversary deluxe edition disc 2 – CD tracks
No.	Title	Original artist	Length
1.	"Tonight May Have to Last Me All My Life" (MF Doom remix)		2:45
2.	"Summer Crane" (Black Dice remix)		0:37
3.	"Frontier Psychiatrist" (Mario Caldato Jr.'s 85% remix)		2:13
4.	"Electricity" (Dr Rockit's Dirty Kiss remix)		1:29
5.	"Electricity" (original Avalanches demo tape)		2:54
6.	"Thank You Caroline" (original Avalanches demo tape)		2:16
7.	"Thank You Caroline" (Andy Votel remix)		2:12
8.	"So Why So Sad" (The Avalanches Sean Penn Mix)	Manic Street Preachers	4:20
9.	"The Shining" (The Avalanches Good Word for the Weekend mix)	Badly Drawn Boy	4:58
10.	"Pablo's Cruise" (original Avalanches demo tape)		0:51
11.	"I'm a Cuckoo" (The Avalanches remix)	Belle and Sebastian	3:03
12.	"Chico" (The Avalanches Wernham Hogg mix)	The Concretes	3:11
13.	"Fade Together" (The Avalanches remix)	Franz Ferdinand	1:36
14.	"Since I Left You" (Stereolab remix)		4:16
15.	"Flight Tonight" (Canyons Travel Agent dub)		4:22
16.	"Radio" (Sinkane remix)		4:43
17.	"A Different Feeling" (Ernest Saint Laurent remix)		4:05
18.	"A Different Feeling" (Carl Craig's Paperclip People remix)		4:09
19.	"Two Hearts in 3/4 Time" (Jackson and His Computer Band remix)		4:00
20.	"Tonight May Have to Last Me All My Life" (Dragged by Leon Vynehall)		4:01
21.	"Tonight May Have to Last Me All My Life" (Edan remix)		3:39
Total length:			65:40

== Personnel ==
Credits according to album notes and AllMusic.

The Avalanches

- Robbie Chater – mixing, production, Yamaha Promix 01 and Akai S2000 samplers
- James Dela Cruz – turntables
- Tony Di Blasi – keyboards (credited with "Halos and Heartstrings" in liner notes)
- Dexter Fabay – turntables (credited with "Animals and Westerns" in liner notes)
- Gordon McQuilten – pianos, percussion
- Darren Seltmann – mixing, production, brass band, vocals, Yamaha Promix 01 and Akai S2000 samplers
- Bobbydazzler/Bobby Dazzler (aka Robbie Chater and Darren Seltmann) – choir, chorus, guitar, design, mixing

Additional personnel

- Chris Corby – assistant engineer
- Dave Davies – assistant engineer
- Tony Espie – mixing
- Antoinette Halloran – vocals
- Matt Maddock – assistant engineer
- Jimi Maroudas – assistant engineer
- Mike Marsh – mastering
- Richie Robinson – mixing
- Sally Russell – vocals
- Saïan Supa Crew – vocals
- Chris Scallan – computer (Pro Tools transfer and Macintosh overhauls)

== Charts ==
=== Weekly charts ===
Chart (2000–2002)	Peak position
Australian Albums (ARIA)	21
Australian Dance Albums (ARIA)	7
French Albums (SNEP)	79
Norwegian Albums (VG-lista)	12
Scottish Albums (Official Charts)	14
Swedish Albums (Sverigetopplistan)	51
UK Albums (Official Charts)	8
UK Independent Albums (Official Charts)	1
US Top Dance/Electronic Albums (Billboard)	10
US Top Heatseekers Albums (Billboard)	31

Chart (2017)	Peak position
Australian Albums (ARIA)	15

Chart (2021)	Peak position
Australian Albums (ARIA)	5
Belgian Albums (Ultratop Wallonia)	142
German Albums (Offizielle Top 100)	74
UK Dance Albums (Official Charts)	3
UK Independent Albums (Official Charts)	11

=== Year-end charts ===
Chart (2001)	Position
Australian Albums (ARIA)	52
UK Albums (OCC)	109

== Certifications ==
Region	Certification	Certified units/sales
Australia (ARIA)	2× Platinum	140,000^{‡}
United Kingdom (BPI)	Gold	100,000^{^}
^{^} Shipments figures based on certification alone.^{‡} Sales+streaming figures based on certification alone.

== See also ==
- 2000 in music
- The Avalanches discography
