= Electricity (The Avalanches song) =

Single by the Avalanches

from the album Since I Left You
- B-side: "Information"
- Released: 13 September 1999
- Recorded: 1999
- Studio: Soft Light Bistro
- Length: 3:48 (1999 single version); 3:29 (album version)
- Label: Modular; Rex; XL
- Songwriters: Robbie Chater; Darren Seltmann; Willie Clark; Clarence Reid
- Producers: Robbie Chater, Darren Seltmann

The Avalanches singles chronology
"Rock City" (1997)	"Electricity" (1999)	"Frontier Psychiatrist" (2000)

"Electricity" is a song by Australian electronic music group the Avalanches. Produced by group members Robbie Chater and Darren Seltmann, it was issued as a single on 13 September 1999 as the group's first release for Modular Recordings. "Electricity" was later remixed and remastered for inclusion on the group's debut album Since I Left You (2000). The song features prominent samples of "Rapp Dirty" by American musician Blowfly, as well as guest vocals from Australian singers Sally Russell and Antoinette Halloran. Several critics' reviews of the song noted its disco sound and likened it to the work of French electronic music duo Daft Punk. "Electricity" was later re-released as a single on 3 December 2001, with single releases containing remixes of the song by DJ Harvey and DJ Sneak.

== Background and composition ==
"Electricity" was the first song from Since I Left You to be recorded. The song was produced by group members Robbie Chater and Darren Seltmann, with the former describing it as "the first number which really came together for us." It was not originally produced for the album, and was only intended for release as a one-off single. The group later included it on Since I Left You as a last-minute addition to the album after deciding that the song "still sound[ed] good."

A dance song with influences of disco, "Electricity" begins with an opera solo performed by Australian soprano Antoinette Halloran. Her vocals repeat throughout the song, mixed with the additional vocals of Australian singer Sally Russell. The song's production features samples of "Rapp Dirty" by American rapper Blowfly and scratching by Avalanches member James De La Cruz. Also featured are the drums from "Da Funk" by Daft Punk.

== Critical reception ==
"Electricity" was met with positive reviews from contemporary music critics. Marc Savlov of the Austin Chronicle wrote that the song "rediscover[s] the sexy summer soul of pure, funky house-play." Sam Richards of The Guardian praised Antoinette Hallorann's "Neptunian operatic overture", calling it an "unexpected delight". NME's Christian Ward compared the track to the music of French electronic music duo Daft Punk, writing that "Electricity" "do[es] that sublime filtered disco thing as well as their French counterparts." Likewise, Anthony Bozza of Rolling Stone called the song "analog-filter disco" and likened it to "Daft Punk without the Kraftwerk influence."

== Release ==
The cover art of the single was taken from Cavalry attacked by Infantry by Jacob Weyer.

"Electricity" was issued as a single in 12-inch format on 13 September 1999, limited to 500 copies. The single was the band's first release under Modular Recordings in Australia, having signed to the label the previous year. In the United Kingdom, Rex Records issued 7-inch singles of "Electricity" with a production run of 1,000 copies. Following the release of the Avalanches' debut album Since I Left You, "Electricity" was re-released by XL Recordings as a double pack featuring a two-part 12-inch EP and an enhanced CD single. The double pack was released on 3 December 2001 in the United Kingdom. Due to the special nature of its release, "Electricity" was disqualified from inclusion on the UK Singles Chart.

== Formats and track listings ==
=== 1999 release ===
- 12-inch single (Australia)

Side one

1. "Electricity"
2. "Information"

Side two

1. "Let's Cheer"
2. "I'm Taken"
- 7-inch single (United Kingdom)

Side one

1. "Electricity"

Side two

1. "Information"

=== 2001 release ===
- 12-inch EP (United Kingdom – part one)

Side one

1. "Electricity" (edit) – 3:46
2. "Electricity" (Harvey's Nightclub Re-Edit) – 6:30

Side two

1. "Electricity" (Dr. Rockit's Dirty Kiss) – 6:51
- 12-inch EP (United Kingdom – part two)

Side one

1. "Electricity" (DJ Sneak's Electrix Remix) – 8:53

Side two

1. "A Different Feeling" (Ernest St. Laurent Remix) – 6:07

- CD single (United Kingdom)
1. "Electricity" (edit) – 3:46
2. "Electricity" (Dr. Rockit's Dirty Kiss) – 6:51
3. "A Different Feeling" (Ernest St. Laurent Remix) – 6:07
4. "Electricity" (original 7" version) – 3:48
5. "Frontier Psychiatrist" (video) – 4:19

== Credits and personnel ==
Credits for "Electricity" adapted from 12-inch EP and Since I Left You album liner notes.

Personnel

- Robbie Chater – arrangement, mixing, production, sampling, songwriting
- Willie Clark – songwriting ("Rapp Dirty" sample)
- Guy Davie – mastering
- James De La Cruz – turntables
- Tony Espie – mixing
- Antoinette Halloran – vocals
- Clarence Reid – songwriting ("Rapp Dirty" sample)
- Sally Russell – vocals
- Darren Seltmann – arrangement, mixing, production, sampling, songwriting
