= Khadija Al Hanafi =

Tunisian footwork music producer

- Born: Hammam-Lif, Tunisia
- Genre: Footwork
- Occupation: Producer
- Years active: 2020–present
- Label: Fada

Khadija Al Hanafi is a Tunisian footwork music producer, currently based in Tunis. She is known for her high-tempo style featuring samples of trap, soul, jazz and video game soundtracks.

== Life and career ==
Al Hanafi was born and raised in Hammam-Lif, Tunisia. She often travelled to France to visit her grandmother, who lived above a record store. There, not owning a turntable, she would take pictures of LPs that caught her attention in order to later seek them out digitally and sample them. Netlabel Fada Records released her debut album Slime Patrol in December 2020, which was produced using this approach.

After having lived in the US, she was arrested and deported back to her native Tunisia. Slime Patrol 2 was released in New Year's Day 2024 as a sequel to her debut. She also contributed production for the fourth volume of Pink Siifu's Got Food at the Crib'!!!! mixtapes and the track "Locked In'!" off his album Black'!Antique.

Al Hanafi was a guest in The Avalanches' The Recording Angel monthly radio show on NTS Radio in January 2025 alongside Salute. She later became an NTS resident for summer 2025, with her own monthly program Slime FM totaling six one-hour episodes between June and October 2025.

Her third album !OK! was released in January 2025, which nearly doubled the 20-minute runtime of the Slime Patrol tapes. Al Hanafi appeared as a featured artist on The Avalanches' 2026 studio album No Bad Memories.

== Discography ==
- Slime Patrol (2020)
- Slime Patrol 2 (2023)
- !OK! (2025)
