= Portraits of Tracy =

American singer

Tracy Amare
- Born: Tracy Geneviève Amare; June 30, 2004 (age 22); Baton Rouge, Louisiana, U.S.
- Genres: Synth-pop; rock music; hip-hop; R&B; soul music; psychedelic rock; indie rock; punk rock
- Occupation: Singer-songwriter
- Instrument: Vocals · guitar · keyboards · bass · drums
- Years active: 2020–present
- Label: Self-released

Tracy Geneviève Amare (born June 30, 2004), known professionally as Portraits of Tracy, is an American singer-songwriter, multi-instrumentalist, and producer.

== Personal life ==
Amare grew up in Louisiana. She characterizes her upbringing as "interesting," noting that she could not express herself fully. Her life in Louisiana was characterized by hardship, with her moving constantly. She grew up listening to hip-hop musicians like Kanye West and J Dilla, as well as punk and hardcore.

Inspired by her cousin, himself a musician and rapper, she began producing on her phone before transitioning to using GarageBand on her Mac and then FL Studio. Amare named her project for the Jaco Pastorius song from his eponymous debut album. Amare's first few projects, including The Misadvice of Junie and Drive Home were produced on school laptops. Amare's focus on music ultimately affected her academic performance, with her grades suffering as a result.

Amare's second project Drive Home and its single "The Party" attracted major attention on the internet. The project, a concept album centered around a self-insert character named Junie, a teenager in the South coming to terms with their gender identity. The project's scope and musical motifs were heavily influenced by Tyler, The Creator and Childish Gambino. "The Party" features a sample of Beach House's "Master of None."

Amare credits streaming revenue from Drive Home as being a vital source of income after she was put out of the house for being a transgender woman. Upon being put out, Amare moved to Los Angeles to pursue music. The move gave her space to more fully express herself as a trans woman and to hone in on her musicianship. Moving to L.A. also exposed her to a wider range of musical artists and genres, including the Beach Boys and the Cocteau Twins. Amare briefly signed with a major label but the deal did not work out.

These older artists influenced her debut EP Q: From Where Do Our Primal Instincts Originate? A: MTV!, whose title is a reference to the debut album by Devo, Q: Are We Not Men? A: We Are Devo!

== Discography ==
Studio albums

- Regardless (2021)
- The Misadvice Of Junie (2021)
- Drive Home (2023)
- Drive Home: Parting Gifts (2024)

EPs

- Q: From Where Do Our Primal Instincts Originate? A: MTV! (2026)

Featured singles

- "Can't Get Over Losing You" by The Avalanches (2026)
