= El Producto (EP) =

EP by the Avalanches
- Released: 8 December 1997
- Genres: Electronica, hip-hop, plunderphonics
- Length: 19:36
- Label: Wondergram/Shock
- Producers: Richard Robinson, Sebatron, the Avalanches

The Avalanches chronology
El Producto (1997)	Since I Left You (2000)

Singles from El Producto
- 1. "Rock City" Released: September 1997

El Producto is the debut extended play by Australian electronic music group the Avalanches. It was released on 8 December 1997 via Wondergram Records and distributed by Shock Records. El Producto was the second release by the group, and included a different, extended version of their debut single, "Rock City", which had appeared on Trifekta Records two months prior.

During this time, the band "started performing widely and attracted a long term recording deal." Based on the EP's success, Steve Pavlovic, head of Wondergram Records, signed the group to his new Modular Recordings label in May 1998. An alternate, extended version of "Rolling High" appeared on the Homebake Festival's Homebake 98 compilation album. Additionally, the band contributed a cover of "Do You Know the Way to San Jose" for the 1998 compilation album To Hal and Bacharach, which was performed in much the same style as the songs on El Producto.

The Avalanches also signed with Rex Records for the exclusive United Kingdom four-track EP Undersea Community, which appeared in March 1999 and marked a change in style as the group moved away from the indie hip-hop approach of their earlier work. They released their debut full-length album, Since I Left You, on Modular in November 2000.

== Production ==
The Avalanches sampled material from vinyl records found in thrift-stores in the creation of their music, including the songs in El Producto. Group members Robbie Chater and Darren Seltmann primarily worked with the Yamaha Promix 01 and Akai S2000 samplers. The EP also contained original input from the band, featuring original instrumentation played by the group's members.

== Track listing ==
All tracks are written by Robbie Chater, Tony Di Blasi, Gordon McQuilten and Darren Seltmann, except where noted

No.	Title	Length
1.	"Untitled Intro"	0:27
2.	"Rolling High"	2:58
3.	"Rap Fever"	4:13
4.	"Rock City"	3:43
5.	"Under Inspection"	3:44
6.	"Run DNA"	3:06
7.	"Untitled Outro" (R. Chater, D. Seltmann)	1:25

== Personnel ==
Musicians

- DJ Dexter – scratching
- Darren Seltmann – vocals

Production

- The Avalanches – recording
- David Briggs – mastering
- Matt Gearing-Thomas – mixing
- Richard Robinson – recording
- Sebatron – recording

Credits adapted from El Producto liner notes.
