= Darren Seltmann =

- Born: Darren Richard Seltmann; Melbourne, Victoria, Australia
- Genre: Electronic
- Occupation: Musician
- Instruments: Vocals; keyboards; guitar; drums
- Years active: 1994–present
- Formerly of: The Avalanches

Darren Richard Seltmann is an Australian singer-songwriter, musician and producer. He co-founded Australian electronic music group the Avalanches in 1997 and appeared on their debut album, Since I Left You (2000). At the 2016 APRA Music Awards, he and his wife Sally Seltmann won Best Original Song Composed for the Screen for "Dancing in the Darkness", which was used in the TV comedy series The Letdown (2016).

== Biography ==
Darren Richard Seltmann, on drums, was a member of indie rock groups Gigantaur, and Charlie Marshall and the Body Electric in the early 1990s. He joined Ripe on drums in late 1992 and is recorded on their second album, The Plastic Hassle (1993). As a band member he toured North America with Ripe and left the group upon return to Australia. Seltmann on vocals, formed Alarm 115 in Melbourne in 1994 as a noise punk outfit inspired by Drive Like Jehu, The Fall, and Ultra Bide. His fellow members were Robbie Chater on keyboards and Tony Di Blasi on keyboards, bass guitar and backing vocals.

Seltmann on keyboards, brass, design, guitar, and mixing, together with Chater and Di Blasi, were co-founders of electronic music group, the Avalanches, in 1997. Their debut album, Since I Left You, was released in November 2000. Seltmann and Chater, as Bobbydazzler, produced the album and their early singles. Seltmann broke both of his legs while on tour promoting that album, one in Brisbane and the other in the United Kingdom. At the ARIA Music Awards of 2001 the Avalanches won Breakthrough Artist – Album and Best Dance Release for Since I Left You, Breakthrough Artist - Single for "Frontier Psychiatrist", while Bobbydazzler won Producer of the Year for their work on the album.

Since I Left You's lead single, "Electricity" (September 1999), had included backing vocals by Sydney-born vocalist, Sally Russell. Russell relocated to Melbourne and began performing as New Buffalo in 2000. She released her debut five-track extended play, About Last Night, in September of the following year. Seltmann produced the EP for his then-fiancée. In 2003 Seltmann married Russell and initially the couple lived in suburban Yarraville.

While working on the Avalanches proposed second album, Seltmann had left by 2006, according to Chater in July 2016, "It was... around 10 years ago that we stopped working together, or more. I was always making stuff and getting on with it, and the new record wasn't materialising quickly. He had a kid, a family, and I guess he realised before I did that it was going to take a long time." Seltmann provided drums and vocals for New Buffalo's second full length album, Somewhere, Anywhere (March 2007) and also co-wrote a track, "Stay with Us". From late 2009 Russell performed and released material under her married name.

From 2016 Seltmann and Russell provided the score for the comedy series The Letdown (2016–17, 2019). They co-wrote "Dancing in the Darkness" for the show. At the APRA Music Awards: Screen Music Awards of 2016 they won Best Original Song Composed for the Screen for the track. Darren and Sally Seltmann issued a soundtrack album, The Letdown (Music from Seasons 1+2), in March 2020. The release was nominated for Best Original Soundtrack or Musical Theatre Cast Album at the 2020 ARIA Music Awards.

== Personal life ==
He married Sally Russell, who performed as New Buffalo, in 2003. He left the Avalanches in 2006 after the birth of their first child.

== Awards and nominations ==
=== ARIA Awards ===
The ARIA Music Awards are presented annually from 1987 by the Australian Recording Industry Association (ARIA).

Year	Nominee / work	Award	Result
2020	The Letdown (Music from Seasons 1+2) (with Sally Seltmann)	Best Original Soundtrack, Cast or Show Album	Nominated
