= The Avalanches =

Australian electronic music group

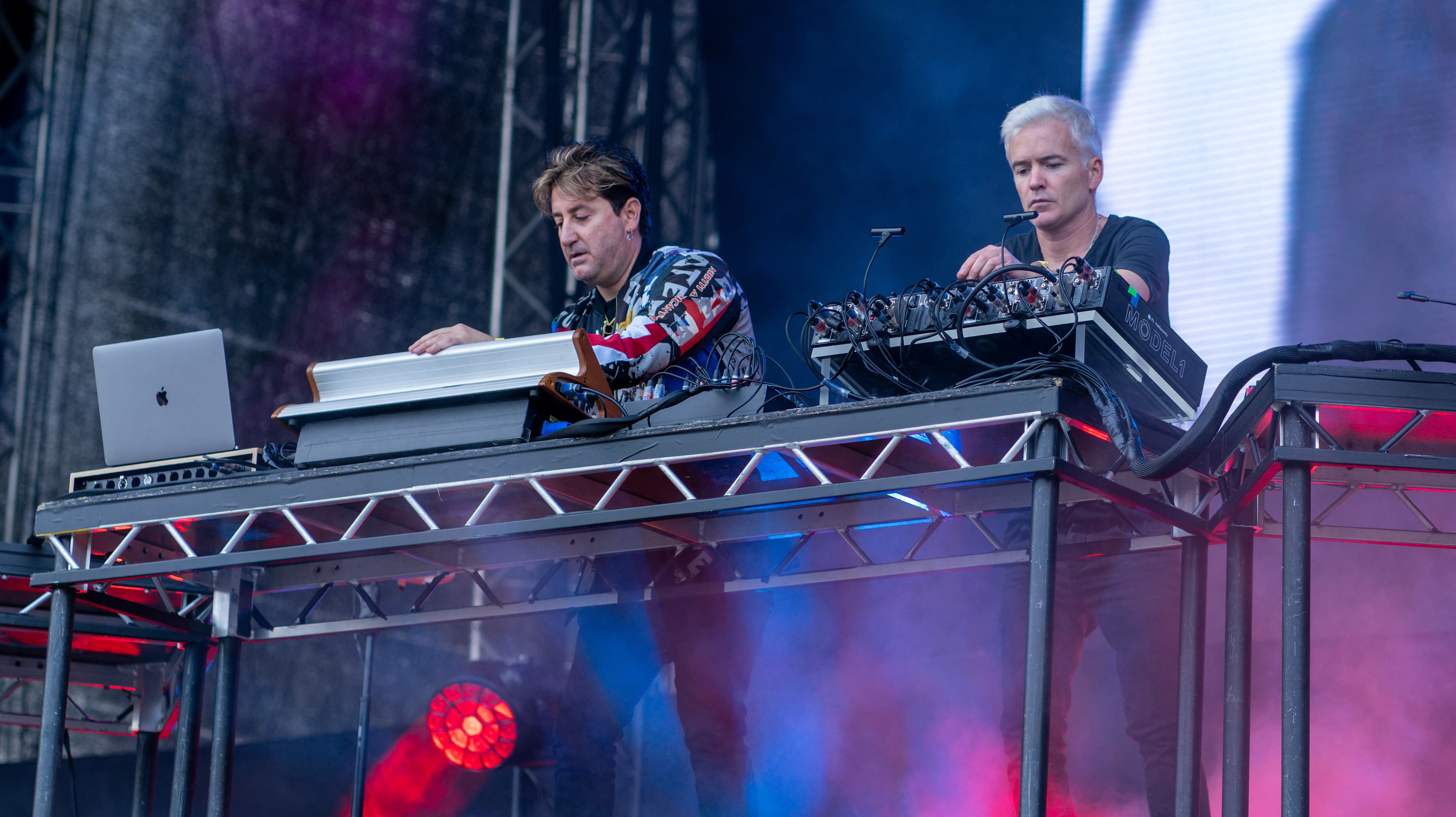
- Tony Di Blasi (left) and Robbie Chater (right) performing as The Avalanches in 2022

Background information
- Origin: Melbourne, Victoria, Australia
- Genres: Electronic; sampledelia; dance; hip-hop; disco; plunderphonics
- Years active: 1997–present
- Labels: Modular; Astralwerks; XL; Trifekta; Wondergram; Rex; Sire; Elektra
- Members: Robbie Chater; Tony Di Blasi; Andy Szekeres
- Past members: Gordon McQuilten; Darren Seltmann; Dexter Fabay; James Dela Cruz; Manabu Etoh; Peter Whitford
- Website: theavalanches.com

The Avalanches are an Australian electronic music group formed in Melbourne in 1997. They have released four studio albums, Since I Left You (2000), Wildflower (2016), We Will Always Love You (2020), and No Bad Memories (2026). They perform a hybrid live show that also incorporates elements of DJing. The group currently consists of co-founding members Robbie Chater and Tony Di Blasi, as well as multi-instrumentalist Andy Szekeres.

The band is an exponent of the plunderphonics genre, and their first album, Since I Left You, has been recognised by many critics as the most important example of the genre.

== Career ==
=== 1994–1996: Origins ===
Three future Avalanches members formed Alarm 115 in Melbourne in 1994 as a noise punk outfit inspired by Drive Like Jehu, The Fall, and Ultra Bide. The line-up was Robbie Chater on keyboards, Tony Di Blasi on keyboards, bass and backing vocals, and Darren Seltmann on vocals (ex-Ripe). By 1995, Manabu Etoh joined on drums. The group bought instruments, recording gear and numerous old vinyl records by the crate at second-hand shops. When Etoh was deported and Alarm 115 disbanded, these records became the core of a new project. Chater was a film student at RMIT University and had access to a recording studio, which he and Seltmann used to turn the records into a 30-song demo tape labelled Pan Amateurs. In 1997 a new group consisting of Chater, Di Blasi, Seltmann, and Gordon McQuilten on keyboards was assembled to play the tracks live. Chater, Di Blasi and McQuilten had all been school mates in Maryborough. Starting in July, their first four shows were played under different names: Swinging Monkey Cocks, Quentin's Brittle Bones, and Whoops Downs Syndrome. The group became "The Avalanches" at their fifth gig, borrowing the new band name from an American surf rock band, which recorded only one album, Ski Surfin' with the Avalanches, in 1963.

=== 1997–1999: Early releases ===
After playing the support slot for Jon Spencer Blues Explosion, they rose to prominence quickly. Trifekta Records released the debut single "Rock City" in September 1997. This was followed in December by their seven-track extended play, El Producto, on Steve Pavlovic's Wondergram Records. Around this time, DJ Dexter Fabay joined the group on turntables and keyboards. Based on El Producto's success, Pavlovic signed the Avalanches to his new Modular Recordings label in May 1998. Leo Silvermann signed them to his label, Rex Records, for the exclusive United Kingdom four-track EP Undersea Community, which released in March 1999. The group's profile grew with support slots on tours by the Beastie Boys, Public Enemy, Stereolab, and Beck. The band also played at the Tibetan Freedom Concert at Sydney Olympic Park, Homebush Bay, Sydney. James Dela Cruz was added to the live line-up on turntables and keyboards, and made his debut with the band at The Palace, St Kilda, supporting Public Enemy. In September 1999 Modular Recordings issued a four-track EP Electricity in Australia (12") and a two-track UK (7") version.

=== 2000–2004: Since I Left You ===
From mid-1998, the Avalanches had been recording their debut album, initially under the working title Pablo's Cruise. In February 2000 they finished mixing it at Sing Sing Studios in Melbourne. Its initial launch date in 2000 was delayed due to the need for sample clearances and overseas interest. By July, with the album, now titled Since I Left You, overdue, Chater's Gimix cassette was made available. This mixtape blended previews of forthcoming album tracks with some band favourites. The first Australian single from the album, "Frontier Psychiatrist", was issued in August, which peaked in the top 50 on the ARIA Singles Chart. It reached No. 6 in Triple J's 2000 Hottest 100 countdown, the world's largest annual radio music poll. In October the band undertook their first Australian headline tour, appearing in all capital cities. All dates were completely sold out. Seltmann broke his leg in Brisbane in an on-stage collision with bassist and singer Di Blasi.

In November 2000, Since I Left You was launched in Melbourne with a boat cruise party aboard the Victoria Star, through Port Phillip Bay, with The Face and other UK media flying to Australia to cover the event. The band won six Australian Dance Music Awards. They travelled to the UK for a three-week promotional stint, including DJ sets at the Social and Fabric Nightclubs, while their remix of Badly Drawn Boy's "The Shining" was released in the UK. Chater estimated that Since I Left You was assembled from approximately 3,500 vinyl samples. One notable example is a sample of Madonna's "Holiday" on the track "Stay Another Season".

The UK version of Since I Left You was released by XL Recordings in 2001, which debuted at No. 8 on the UK Albums Chart in April, and quickly topped 200,000 sales in the UK. Also that month, the first UK single from the album, the title track "Since I Left You", was released and debuted at No. 16 on the UK Singles Chart.

The "Since I Left You" video won Video of the Year at the MTV Europe Music Awards. In July 2001 the second UK single, "Frontier Psychiatrist", debuted at No. 18. The video for "Frontier Psychiatrist" was later awarded the runner-up prize at Soho Shorts Film Festival in the UK. At the ARIA Music Awards of 2001, the group won four categories, Best New Artist – Album and Best Dance Release for Since I Left You, Best New Artist – Single for "Frontier Psychiatrist", and Producer of the Year for Bobbydazzler (production name for Chater and Seltmann). They were also nominated in five additional categories, Album of the Year and Best Group for Since I Left You, Single of the Year for "Frontier Psychiatrist", Engineer of the Year by Tony Espie and Bobbydazzler and Best Cover Art by Bobbydazzler for Since I Left You.

London-Sire Records released the United States version in November 2001. When the label dissolved in 2003, the Avalanches switched to Elektra. The album was also released in Japan, with bonus track "Everyday". The At Last Alone EP (rescheduled tour EP with revised track listing) was also issued in Japan. In the United States, the album peaked at No. 31 on Billboard's Heatseekers chart and No. 10 on Billboard's Top Electronic Albums chart. In the US, a promotional "Since I Left You" 12" featuring remixes from Stereolab and Prince Paul was released, and the Avalanches' remix of the Manic Street Preachers' "So Why So Sad" was issued worldwide.

Professional critics included Since I Left You on their "Best of 2000s" lists. The album was placed at No. 4 in Juice magazine's 'Best Australian albums of all time' list, and No. 10 in Pitchfork Media's top albums of the decade. In its review, Pitchfork Media bestowed the album with a high 9.5 score. In October 2010, the album was listed at No. 10 in the book 100 Best Australian Albums. In 2011, American hip-hop artist Questlove named Since I Left You in his top ten albums list.

=== 2005–2019: Wildflower ===
The Avalanches had been working on their second album since at least 2005. Seltmann had said the album was starting out as "ambient world music", but it was still moving in different directions and would feature both samples and live music. Chater later revealed that Seltmann had left the group by 2006, "we stopped working together... I was always making stuff and getting on with it, and the new record wasn't materialising quickly. He had a kid, a family, and I guess he realised before I did that it was going to take a long time."

Subsequent announcements were made of the album's release, however, it had not appeared by December 2011. Other artists began to announce having worked with the band on tracks around that time. In February 2014 Modular Recordings confirmed Seltmann had left, stating "officially the band is Robbie Chater and Tony Di Blasi right now." The band's official Facebook page was updated in 2015, listing James Dela Cruz had rejoined.

In April 2016, the Avalanches added new images of a gold butterfly on black cloth to their social media accounts and official website. On 24 May, the group posted a video poking fun at their long hiatus since their last album and the continued speculation of a follow-up release. On 2 June 2016, Australian radio station Triple J premiered "Frankie Sinatra", the lead single from their second album. The album title was revealed the same day to be Wildflower, with a 1 July release date and Chater and Di Blasi as co-producers. On 3 June, the Avalanches performed at the Primavera Sound festival in Barcelona; it was supposed to be their first live-band show since 2007, but last-minute visa issues forced them into playing a DJ set instead, where they premiered a new song, "Subways". The studio version was released on 22 June.

At the ARIA Music Awards of 2016 the group received six more nominations, Album of the Year, Best Dance Release and Best Group for Wildflower; Producer of the Year for Chater and Di Blasi; Engineer of the Year for Chater and Espie; and Best Cover Art for Lost Art (Chater). At Metacritic, which assigns a normalised rating out of 100 to reviews from mainstream critics, it received an average score of 83, based on 33 reviews, indicating critical acclaim. It peaked at No. 1 on the ARIA Albums Chart.

=== 2020–2024: We Will Always Love You ===
On 11 February 2020, the Avalanches posted a photo of a promotional billboard in Melbourne advertising a website. On the website, a video played containing several faint voices, followed by a Morse code message stating 'WWALY'. On 14 February, the website was updated with a second video containing another morse code message, this time spelling "20 FEB". Two days later on 16 February, the Avalanches posted a photo of a second billboard in London.

On 20 February 2020, the Avalanches released a single, "We Will Always Love You" featuring Blood Orange. With this release, they also confirmed their third studio album. On 18 March, they released another single, "Running Red Lights" featuring Pink Siifu and Rivers Cuomo from Weezer. The song is dedicated to David Berman and features lyrics from the Purple Mountains song "Darkness and Cold".

The album, entitled We Will Always Love You was released on 11 December 2020 and features contributions from Denzel Curry, Tricky and Jamie xx.

In 2024, they featured on the Jamie xx track 'All You Children' from his album In Waves.

=== 2025–present: No Bad Memories ===
Following the conclusion of touring in support for We Will Always Love You, the Avalanches began dropping cryptic hints regarding a fourth studio album. Early teasers appeared in as early as 2021 and again in 2023, with the band sharing social media posts labeled "Album #4." In late 2025 and 2026, the group increased their activity by wiping their Instagram profile and debuting a new logo.

On 15 May 2026, the group released the single "Together," featuring Nikki Nair, Jessy Lanza, and Prentiss. Press materials for the single confirmed that frequent collaborator Andy Szekeres – formerly of Midnight Juggernauts – had officially joined the group, expanding their line-up to a trio for the first time in a decade.

On 1 June 2026, the group released the single "Every Single Weekend" featuring Jamie xx, marking their second official collaboration. An earlier version of the track had featured as an interlude on xx's last album, 2024's In Waves. On 23 July 2026, the group released the single “Blue Shadows” featuring Karen O, the lead singer of the indie rock band Yeah Yeah Yeahs.

On 7 August 2026, the Avalanches officially announced their fourth studio album, No Bad Memories. It was released on 16 October 2026 via EMI. With the album's announcement came the release of the album's fourth single, "Can't Get Over Losing You," which features American singer-songwriter Portraits of Tracy.

On 8 September 2026, the group released the album's fifth single "Far Away", featuring John Glacier and Khadija Al Hanafi, having written it previous year. The visuals for the accompanying music video were filmed on a 2001 Sony Handycam during a road trip through Tokyo and Minakami in December the previous year. The group said of the track: "We spent a beautiful London summer working on a number of tracks with John. This track in particular captures that blissed out lysergic feeling of dusty evening light, soaking up music with friends as the light filters through the trees and feeling as if we're living in a shared dream."

On 1 October 2026, two remixes of "Together" were released by the duos Frost Children and Baalti to coincide with the announcement of an Australian tour in February and March 2027 on 29 September. The pre-order of a laminate for the tour gave buyers exclusive presale access, as well as access to unreleased remixes and DJ mixes. On 16 October 2026, the day of the album's release, a one-take music video for "I Give Everything I Have 2 U" was released. It stars the American actor Haley Joel Osment, who also lent his voice to several interlude tracks on the album.

== Legacy ==
The band has been noted as an important pioneering example of plunderphonics, with one reviewer referring to them as the "legendary plunderphonics powerhouse". Their first album, Since I Left You released in 2000, has been highlighted as influential, a masterpiece and a particular iconic example of the genre. The album has been noted for the large amount of samples it uses, around 3500, and the fact it is entirely made of samples with no live music. It was also noted for its complexity and the use of dialogue samples. The album has been described as incredibly complex, and even dadaist. Since I Left You has appeared on various top examples of the Plunderhouse genre, and has also been described as one of the three pivotal plunderphonics albums, along with DJ Shadow’s Endtroducing in 1996, and J Dilla's Donuts in 2006.

A number of music critics, including Volksgeist, Amar Edirwira writing for VinylFactory and others regard Since I Left You as the best plunderphonics album of all time.

It has been noted by legal commentary that the small size of samples used by the Avalanches in their work may not cross the threshold of being significant, which would then allow for a legal case to be brought by the original sampled artist.

In 2025, Rolling Stone Australia ranked the Avalanches first in their list of top 50 greatest Australian electronic music acts.

== Live performances ==
The Avalanches, initially, played live using samplers, analogue keyboards, bass guitar, drum kit, and theremin. Their set-up later included four turntables, a percussion stand, and a battery of MIDI-controlled special effects.

The band performed at festivals during 2000–2001, including the Big Day Out, Falls Festival and V1. For their European live tour, Peter "Snakey" Whitford was used as a touring percussionist, he had previously played in the Afro Psych band Prophecy throughout the Indonesian islands. Seltmann broke his ankle during the band's Electric Ballroom show in London, while Dela Cruz suffered a concussion on-stage at the V2001 festival. The remaining live dates were DJ sets with Chater only. Despite this, the band eventually received the Best Live Act 2001 award from MUZIK magazine. This format continued for the United States and Japan Since I Left You Tours. Chater, Dela Cruz and Fabay also took the DJ show around Australia, calling themselves the Magic Midgets.

The Avalanches continued DJing at Australian festivals such as Golden Plains and Splendour in the Grass throughout 2006 and into 2007, although these sets were a return to a heavier, club sound and markedly different from the previous Brains' DJ sets. The group returned to live performances in 2016, with a performance at Splendour in the Grass. Their live setup feature Chater on bass and Di Blasi on turntables, alongside guest musicians Paris Jeffree on drums, Spank Rock as MC, and Eliza Wolfgramm on vocals.

In May 2017 The Avalanches curated The Avalanches – Since I Left You Block Party as part of Sydney's Vivid LIVE festival. Playing outdoors at the Sydney Opera House, The Avalanches headlined and were joined by 'special guests' DJ Shadow, Briggs, Sampa the Great, Jonti and DJ JNETT.

== Members ==
=== Current ===
- Robbie Chater – keyboards, guitar, bass, drums, percussion (1997–present)
- Tony Di Blasi – keyboards, bass, theremin, synthesizer, turntables, backing vocals (1997–present)
- Andy Szekeres – keyboards, guitar, bass (2026–present)

=== Former ===
Listed alphabetically:

- James Dela Cruz – turntables, keyboards (1999–2004, 2015–2016)
- Manabu Etoh – drums (1997)
- Dexter Fabay – turntables (1997–2003)
- Gordon McQuilten – keyboards, percussion, piano, drums (1997–2001)
- Darren Seltmann – guitar (1997–2006), keyboards (1999–2006), vocals (1997–1999)
- Peter "Snakey" Whitford – drums (2001–2002)

=== Wildflower touring band (2016–2018) ===
- Spank Rock – rapping, toasting, backing vocals
- Eliza Wolfgramm – vocals, rapping
- Paris Jeffree – drums, percussion
- Oscar Vincente Slorach-Thorn – vocals
- Jonti Danilewitz – guitar, backing vocals, percussion, drums

== Discography ==
Studio albums

- Since I Left You (2000)
- Wildflower (2016)
- We Will Always Love You (2020)
- No Bad Memories (2026)

== Tours ==
- Since I Left You Tour (2000)
- Wildflower Tour (2016-2017)
- We Will Always Love You Tour (2020-2021)
- No Bad Memories Australian Tour (2027)

== Awards and nominations ==
=== ARIA Music Awards ===
The ARIA Music Awards are annual awards, which recognise excellence, innovation, and achievement across all genres of Australian music. The Avalanches have been nominated for 15 awards and won four.

Year	Nominee / work	Award	Result	Ref.
2001	Since I Left You	Best Group	Nominated	
2001	Since I Left You	Breakthrough Artist – Album	Won	
2001	Since I Left You	Best Dance Release	Won	
2001	Since I Left You	Album of the Year	Nominated	
2001	"Frontier Psychiatrist"	Breakthrough Artist – Single	Won	
2001	"Frontier Psychiatrist"	Single of the Year	Nominated	
2001	Bobbydazzler (Robbie Chater, Darren Seltmann) for Since I Left You	Producer of the Year	Won	
2001	Bobbydazzler (Robbie Chater, Darren Seltmann) for Since I Left You	Best Cover Art	Nominated	
2001	Tony Espie, Bobbydazzler (Chater, Seltmann) for Since I Left You	Engineer of the Year	Nominated	
2016	Wildflower	Album of the Year	Nominated	
2016	Wildflower	Best Group	Nominated	
2016	Wildflower	Best Dance Release	Nominated	
2016	Chater, Tony Di Blasi for Wildflower	Producer of the Year	Nominated	
2016	Espie, Chater for Wildflower	Engineer of the Year	Nominated	
2016	Lost Art (Chater) for Wildflower	Best Cover Art	Nominated	
2021	We Will Always Love You	Album of the Year	Nominated	
2021	We Will Always Love You	Best Group	Nominated	
2021	We Will Always Love You	Best Pop Release	Nominated	
2021	The Avalanches Live	Best Australian Live Act	Nominated	
2021	Johnathan Zawada for The Avalanches – "The Divine Chord"	Best Video	Nominated	
2021	Robert Chater for The Avalanches – We Will Always Love You	Producer of the Year	Nominated	
2021	Tony Espie for The Avalanches – We Will Always Love You	Engineer of the Year	Nominated	
2021	Jonathan Zawada for The Avalanches – We Will Always Love You	Best Cover Art	Nominated	
2026	Jonathan Zawada for The Avalanches – "Every Single Weekend"	Best Video	Nominated	

=== Australian Music Prize ===
The Australian Music Prize (the AMP) is an annual award of $30,000 given to an Australian band or solo artist in recognition of the merit of an album released during the year of award. They commenced in 2005.

Year	Nominee / work	Award	Result
2016	Wildflower	Australian Music Prize	Nominated
2020	We Will Always Love You	Album of the Year	Won

=== J Awards ===
The J Awards are an annual series of Australian music awards that were established by the Australian Broadcasting Corporation's youth-focused radio station Triple J. They commenced in 2005.

Year	Nominee / work	Award	Result
2016	Wildflower	Australian Album of the Year	Nominated
2021	We Will Always Love You	Australian Album of the Year	Nominated
2021	The Avalanches	Double J Artist of the Year	Won
2026	The Avalanches	Double J Artist of the Year	Nominated

=== Music Victoria Awards ===
The Music Victoria Awards, are an annual awards night celebrating Victorian music. They commenced in 2005.

Year	Nominee / work	Award	Result	Ref.
2021	We Will Always Love You	Best Victorian Album	Nominated	
2021	"Wherever You Go"	Best Victorian Song	Nominated	
2021	The Avalanches	Best Group	Nominated	

=== National Live Music Awards ===
The National Live Music Awards (NLMAs) are a broad recognition of Australia's diverse live industry, celebrating the success of the Australian live scene. The awards commenced in 2016.

Year	Nominee / work	Award	Result
2016	Paris Jeffree (The Avalanches)	Live Drummer of the Year	Nominated
