= Indo-Caribbean Americans =

Ethnic group

Total population
- 232,817 (2007); 300,000 - 400,000 (2020 estimate)

Regions with significant populations
- New York & New Jersey (New York metropolitan area and Schenectady-Capital District); Florida (Miami metropolitan area-South Florida, Greater Orlando, Tampa Bay Area, and Ocala metropolitan area); Minneapolis–Saint Paul metropolitan area; Texas (Greater Houston and the Texas Triangle); Washington, D.C. metropolitan area; Georgia; United States Virgin Islands

Languages
- American English; Caribbean English (predominantly Trinidadian and Tobagonian and Guyanese); Surinamese Dutch; Caribbean Hindustani; Hinglish; Tamil

Religion
- Majority: Hinduism; Significant Minority: Christianity; Islam; Other Minority: Irreligion; Sikhism; Jainism; Buddhism; Zoroastrianism; Others

Related ethnic groups
- Indo-Caribbean people; Indian Americans; South Asian Americans; Dutch South Asians; British Indo-Caribbean people; Indo-Canadians; Indian people; Indian diaspora

Indo-Caribbean Americans or Indian-Caribbean Americans or Indo-West Indian Americans, are Americans who trace their ancestry ultimately to India, though whose recent ancestors lived in the West Indies or Caribbean, where they migrated beginning in 1838 as indentured laborers. There are large populations of Indo–Trinidadians and Tobagonians and Indo-Guyanese along with a smaller population of Indo-Surinamese, Indo-Jamaicans and other Indo-Caribbean people in the United States, especially in the New York metropolitan area and Florida. The Washington metropolitan area, Texas, and Minnesota also have small numbers of Indo-Guyanese and Indo-Trinidadians. Indo-Caribbean Americans are a subgroup of Caribbean Americans as well as Indian Americans, which are a subgroup of South Asian Americans, which itself is a subgroup of Asian Americans.

== Migration history ==
Since the 1960s, a large Indo-Caribbean community has developed in South Richmond Hill, a neighborhood in the New York City borough of Queens in the state of New York. The Indo-Caribbean population has also grown rapidly in the Floridian cities of Tampa, Orlando, Kissimmee, Poinciana, Fort Myers, Naples, Ocala, West Palm Beach, Lake Worth, Wellington, Boynton Beach, Loxahatchee, The Acreage, Fort Lauderdale, Miami, Homestead, Cutler Bay, Palmetto Bay, Miami Gardens, Port Saint Lucie, Coral Springs, Margate, Lauderdale Lakes, North Lauderdale (more than 1% of residents in the city were born in Trinidad and Tobago), Sunrise, Plantation, Parkland, Lauderhill, Pompano Beach, Hallandale Beach, Hollywood, Oakland Park, Tamarac, Cooper City, Miramar, Davie, Weston, Southwest Ranches, and Pembroke Pines. Indo-Surinamese tend to migrate to the Netherlands, but have started to settle in Florida and the New York metropolitan area in small numbers. Indo-Jamaicans also live in moderate numbers throughout the New York metropolitan area and Florida. There are also smaller numbers of Indo-Barbadians, Indo-Belizeans, Indo-French Guianese, Indo-Grenadians, Indo-Guadeloupeans, Indo-Martiniquais, Indo-Kittitian and Nevisian, Indo-Saint Lucian, Indo-Vincentian and Grenadinese in the New York metropolitan area and in Florida.

== Culture and religion ==
A majority of Indo-Caribbean Americans are followers of Hinduism. Although Caribbean Hinduism doesn’t rely on caste systems followed in South Asia, social and class divides persisted in the Caribbean and in America. A minority of Indo-Caribbeans belong to Islam, Christianity and other religions. Major holidays such as Diwali, Phagwah, Eid, Hosay, Indian Arrival Day, Easter, and Christmas are celebrated with a distinct flavor unique to the Caribbean.

The Richmond Hill Phagwah Parade is the largest Holi celebration in the United States. Thousands attend the parade annually each Spring in Queens, with thousands of attendees crowding Liberty Avenue and Smoky Oval Park.

South Florida has become a destination for roti shops, Indian clothing boutiques, threading, mandirs/kovils, masjids, Indian churches, and annual Indo-Caribbean Hindu, Muslim, and Christian religious events. It is also a popular spot for Indo-Caribbean artists. The Florida Melody Makers are the most well known Indo-Caribbean American band for years and continue to perform around the Southeastern United States. WHSR 980 AM and WWNN used to host Indian musical and religious programming weekly every Saturday and featured community leaders like Pandit Ramsurat K. Maharaj, Bhagwan R. Singh, Natty Ramoutar, Peter Ganesh, Al Mustapha, and Sam Subramani.

Most cultural shows continue to tie a cultural bond between the Indo-Caribbean, Indian-American, and wider South Asian American communities, as well as inter-religious bonding between Hindus, Muslims, Christians, Sikhs, Jains, and Buddhist especially those hosted at educational institutions with an Indian student association like Florida International University, Florida Atlantic University, Nova Southeastern University, Broward College, Palm Beach State College, and the University of Miami.

The Shiva Mandir in Oakland Park (first Hindu Mandir in South Florida, built in the 1980s by the Florida Hindu Organization led by Pt. Ramsurat K. Maharaj and hosts one of the largest annual Diwali shows in Florida), the Shree Saraswati Devi Mandir in Oakland Park, Krishna Mandir in Hollywood, Arya Samaj Mandir in Riverland, Shiva Lingam Mandir (Shiv Shakti Hanuman Mandir) in Margate, Palm Beach Hindu Mandir in Loxahatchee, Sanatan Sansthan Mandir in Loxahatchee, Shri Lakshmi Mandir in West Palm Beach, Florida Sevashram Sangha in Lake Worth, Lakshmi Narayan Mandir in Palmetto Estates, Amar Jyoti Mandir in Palmetto Bay, Shri Mariamman Temple in Opa-locka, and the Arya Samaj of Miami Mandir in Princeton are largely attended by Indo-Caribbean people. Plantation High School, a school where most Caribbean people and Asians are of Indian descent, hosted an annual Diwali show from 1993 to 2008. Starting as a one-day event in 2008 and expanding to a three-day event since 2009, the Divali Nagar USA entertains the local community with musical and religious performances, food, and vendors.

Music is a large part of the Indo-Caribbean American community, which includes the tunes of Bollywood, Indian classical music (especially taan, dhrupad, thumri, kajari, chaiti, hori, sawani, and ghazal), Indian folk music (especially biraha, chowtal, and other Bhojpuri folk songs), bhajans, kirtan, quwwalis, quaseedas, chutney, baithak gana, chutney parang, chutney soca, tassa, soca, parang, steelpan, pichakaree, calypso, dancehall, and reggae. Bharatnatyam and kathak are respected classical traditional dances, and dance items from Hindi films, Bhojpuri films, Tamil films, and Telugu films have grown in favor as well. With the increasing emphasis on partying, Bollywood, chutney, chutney-soca, and soca music are preferred by the young crowd. (see Indo-Caribbean music)

Politically, Indo-Caribbean Americans tend to favor the Democratic Party, with a AALDEF exit poll indicating that a majority (86%) of Indo-Caribbean American voters backed the Joe Biden and Kamala Harris ticket in the 2020 presidential election.

== Notable people ==
=== Indo-Guyanese Americans ===
- Avi Nash - actor
- Gaiutra Bahadur - author
- Anjulie - singer and musician
- Rhona Fox - actress and businesswoman
- Terry Vivkeanand Gajraj - singer
- Pandit Prakash Gossai - Hindu religious leader
- Nezam Hafiz - cricketer and victim of the September 11 attacks
- Harischandra Khemraj - writer
- Rajiv Mohabir - poet
- Deborah Persaud – virologist
- Anisa Singh - singer, author, businesswoman
- Stanley Praimnath - bank executive and survivor of the September 11 attacks
- Annand Mahendra "Victor" Ramdin - professional poker player and philanthropist

=== Indo-Jamaican Americans ===
- Shaun Bridgmohan - jockey
- Rajiv Maragh - jockey

=== Indo-Surinamese Americans ===
- Vinoodh Matadin - fashion photographer

=== Indo-Trinidadian and Tobagonian Americans ===
- Mahaboob Ben Ali - businessman
- Gerry Bednob - actor and comedian
- Cathy Bissoon - United States district judge
- Niala Boodhoo - journalist, host, and executive producer
- Annie Dookhan - convicted felon and former chemist
- Ramin Ganeshram - journalist
- Reema Harrysingh - former First Lady of Trinidad and Tobago
- Ismith Khan - author and educator
- Kareem Rashad Sultan Khan - soldier
- Krishna Maharaj - British businessman convicted of murder in Miami, Florida
- Davan Maharaj - former editor-in-chief and publisher of the Los Angeles Times
- Ria Persad - mathematician, classical musician, and model
- Anantanand Rambachan - Hindu religious scholar
- Errol Sitahal - actor
- Lakshmi Singh - NPR's national midday newscaster
- Bhaskar Sunkara - political publisher and writer

== See also ==
- British Indo-Caribbean people
- Indian Americans
- Indo-Caribbean people
- Desi
- Trinidadian Americans
- Fijian Americans
- Guyanese Americans
- Indian diaspora
  - Tamil diaspora
- Indo-Fijian American
