= List of chutney musicians =

This is a list of chutney musicians:

== Individuals ==
- Ravi Bissambhar
- Ramdew Chaitoe
- Rikki Jai (1998, 1999, 2001, 2002, joint-2003 Chutney Soca Monarch)
- Sundar Popo
- Neeshan Prabhoo
- Drupatee Ramgoonai
- Heeralal "Hero" Rampartap (1997, joint-2003, 2005 Chutney Soca Monarch)
- Adesh Samaroo
- Kumari Kanchan Dinkerao Mail Shah
- Ras Shorty
- Rakesh Yankaran

== See also ==
- List of calypso musicians
- Lists of musicians
