= Chutney parang =

Music style

- Stylistic origins: Joropo, Venezuelan music, Colombian music, Latin American music, Spanish music, Indian music, Trinidadian and Tobagonian music, Indo-Caribbean music, chutney music, chutney soca, parang
- Cultural origins: Trinidad and Tobago
- Typical instruments: Cuatro, maracas, guitar, vocals, violin, claves, caja, mandolin, tambourine, steelpan, dhantal, dholak, tassa, harmonium, tabla, drums, piano

Chutney parang or parang chutney is a style of music that is a cross between Venezuela, Colombia, and Trinidad and Tobago's traditional Christmas music, parang and Indo-Trinidadian chutney music. It is sung in English, Hindustani, and Spanish.
