= Sundar Popo =

Trinidadian and Tobagonian musician (1943–2000)

Ustad Sundar Popo HBM
- Born: Sundarlal Popo Bahora; 4 November 1943; Monkey Town, Barrackpore, Victoria County, Trinidad and Tobago
- Died: 2 May 2000 (aged 56); Monkey Town, Barrackpore, Penal-Debe, Trinidad and Tobago
- Other names: Sunilal Popo Bahora, King of Chutney, Father of Chutney, Don of Chutney, The Champ
- Occupations: Singer, musician
- Musical career
- Genres: Chutney, Indian folk music, bhajan
- Instruments: Vocals, harmonium, dholak, tabla, dhantal, manjira, khartal
- Years active: 1969–2000
- Label: Windsor Records / JMC Records

Sundar Popo HBM, born Sundarlal Popo Bahora (Note: pronounced [suⁿd̪ərəlɑːlə poːpoː bəɦoːrɑː]) (4 November 1943 – 2 May 2000), was a Trinidadian and Tobagonian musician. He is credited as being the founding father of chutney music, beginning with his 1969 hit Nana and Nani.

== Early life ==
Popo was born on 4 November 1943 in Monkey Town, Barrackpore, Trinidad and Tobago. His family were Hindu Indo-Trinidadians. Both his parents were musicians; his mother was a singer and his father was an accomplished tassa drummer. At the age of 15, he began singing bhajans at mandirs and weddings in his hometown for 15 to 30 cents a show. Popo worked as a watchman at a Barrackpore factory, and trained in music under the Indian classical singer Ustad James Ramsawak.

== Career ==
In 1969, he met Moean Mohammed, a radio host and promoter. After listening to Nani and Nana, a song with lyrics in both Trinidadian Hindustani and Trinidadian English, describing the daily lives of an Indian maternal grandmother (Nani) and maternal grandfather (Nana), Mohammed got maestro Harry Mahabir to record the song at Television House, accompanied by the British West Indies Airways (BWIA) National Indian Orchestra. The song revolutionized Indo-Caribbean music in Trinidad and Tobago. After the success of Nani and Nana, Popo devoted more of his time to his singing career. He followed Nani and Nana with an album combining local Trinidadian music with traditional Indian folk music. In total, he recorded more than 15 albums. He is best known for his song Scorpion Gyul. Babla & Kanchan had success with their version of his "Pholourie Bina Chutney".

After the release of Nani and Nana, he followed up shortly in the mid 1970s with a string of popular singles and appearances on Mastana Bahar and the Indian Cultural Pageants. His singles were then released on his first LP, Come Dance With The Champ (1979). Through Moean Mohammed's Windsor Records, his singles and early 1980s LPs were distributed throughout the Caribbean, South America, North America and Europe with assistance from Rohit Jagessar and various other producers and record store owners. By the late 1980s, he started making frequent appearances outside of the Caribbean to perform. He appeared as a headliner in New York. He performed with international Indian stars Babla & Kanchan, Anup Jalota, Amitabh Bachchan, and Kishore Kumar. Popo also performed with numerous Chutney artists and other Trinidadian and Caribbean artists.

Popo won many awards during his career, and in 1995 Black Stalin won the Trinidad and Tobago Calypso Monarch title with his Tribute to Sundar Popo. There are also other tributes to Popo done by Devannand Gatto, Terry Gajraj, Rikki Jai, Ravi Bissambhar, Brian Mohan, Anthony Batson, Superblue, Dave Lall, Drupatee Ramgoonai, and Chris Garcia. In addition to his solo albums, Popo has also released collaborations with Babla & Kanchan, and JMC Triveni.

== Death and legacy ==
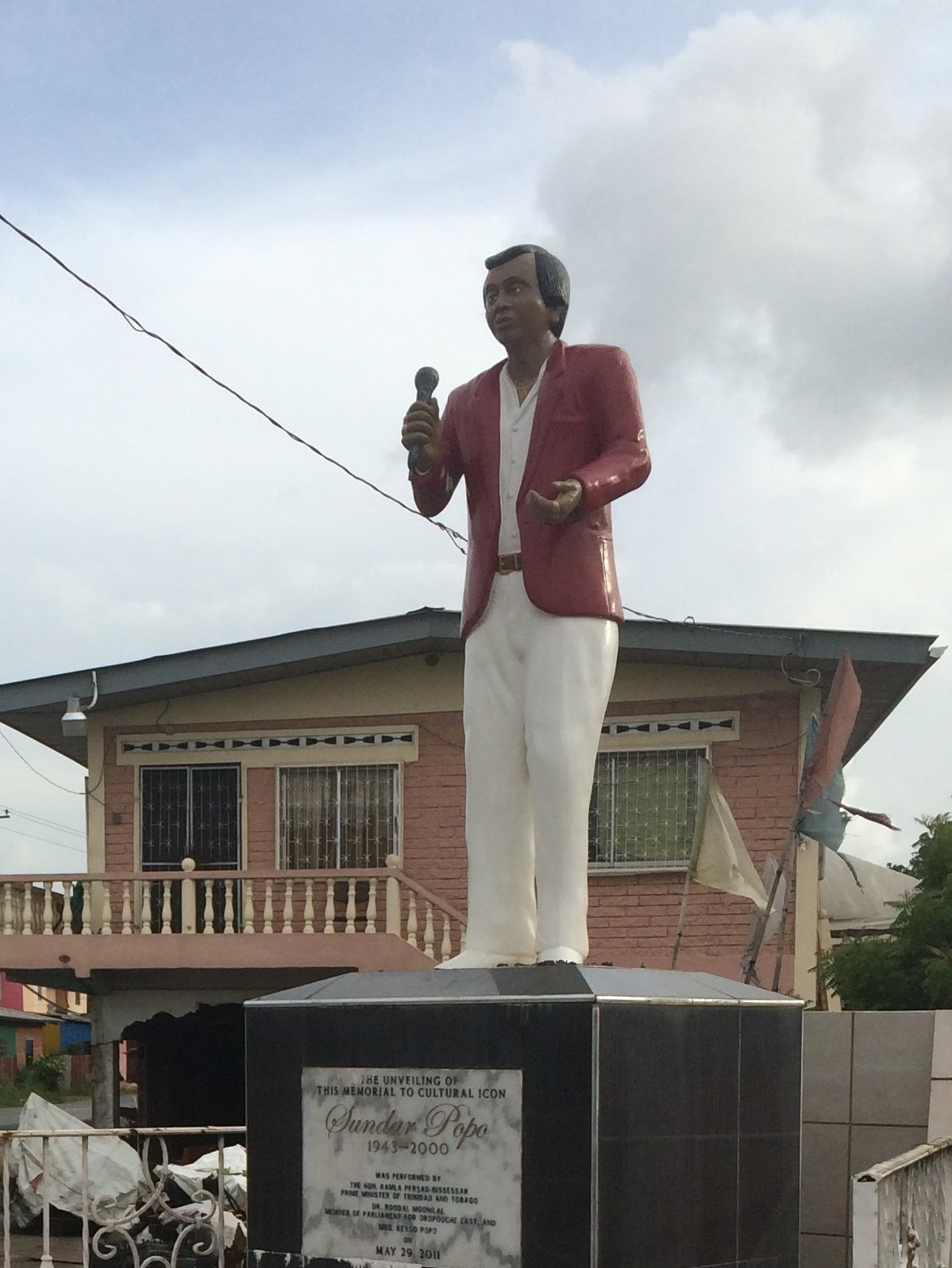
Statue of Sundar Popo in Debe

While Popo had recorded and performed prolifically since the late 1960s, failing health and eyesight forced him to slow down. At the 2000 Chutney Monarch competition, his performance had to be cut short after one song, and he played his final concert on 1 April 2000, in Connecticut. On 2 May 2000, he died at the home he had built on Lal Beharry Trace in Monkey Town from heart and kidney ailments relating to diabetes. His funeral was attended by Trinidad and Tobago Prime Minister, Basdeo Panday. He is survived by his three sons Hemant, Harripersad, and Jaiknath Sundar, and his daughter Sundari. Popo's granddaughters, Chandra and Natasha Sundar, are now following in their grandfather's footsteps in singing. An auditorium called Sundarlal Popo Bahora Auditorium is named after him at the Southern Academy for the Performing Arts (SAPA) in San Fernando. At that same auditorium, a play called "Sundar" is about Popo's life, produced by Iere Theatre Productions Ltd. Popo's song "Chadar Bichawo Balma" was a song that Amitabh Bachchan incorporated into his medleys on his live stage performances in 1982/83. Sonu Nigam has also done a rendition on Popo's songs. Kalpana Patowary has also resung some of Popo's songs. Popo's song "Pholourie Bina Chutney" was resung and put into the popular Bollywood movie Dabangg 2. There are negotiations going on to rename Monkey Town, the small village Popo was from, to Sundar Popo Village and to rename the street he lived on, Lal Beharry Trace to Sundar Popo Road. There is a statue of Sundar Popo in Debe.

== Awards ==
- Four-time winner of the Indian Cultural Pageant
- National Award for Excellence
- Local Song category Indian Cultural Pageant (1976)
- Top Indian vocalist (1988)
- Sunshine Award for first place in Indian Soca (1993)
- King of Chutney in South Florida, United States (1993)
- The National Hummingbird Medal of Trinidad and Tobago (silver) (1993)
- Caribbean Music Award (1994)
- "Caribbean Bachanal" trophy (1996)

== Discography ==
=== Albums ===
- Come Dance with the Champ – 1979
- Hot & Spicy (with Anup Jalota) – 1980
- Hot & Sweet – 1981
- The Nana and Nani Man Sings Again – 1982
- Sundar Fever – 1985
- The Latest, The Greatest – 1986
- Sundar Soca – 1986
- Indian Soca – 1987
- Screwdriver – 1988
- Oh My Lover – 1989
- Nana & Nani Don't Cry – 1989
- Sundar Popo's Heartbreak – 1990
- Who We Go Bring Back Again? – 1991
- Is The Spaner She Want – 1992
- Sweet Sweet Guyana (with Anand Yankaran)- 1993
- Children Children Respect Your Mother & Father – 1993
- Dance Party King – 1994
- Classic – 1994
- Cool Yuhself With Cold Water – 1995
- Musical Voyage: East Meets West – 1998
- Unity – 1998
- Friends – 2000

=== 7" and 12" ===
- Nana & Nani bw Indian Moments of Treasure – 1969
- Play You Mas – 1971
- Scorpion Gyul bw Phuluwrie Bina Chatnee – 1976
- Caroni Gyul bw Ab Na Jaibay – 1978
- Come My Darling bw Sabhagie – 1975
- Hum Najaiba bw Tears in My Eyes – 1978
- Maa Ka Mohabat bw Don't Fall in Love – 1977
- Naina Bandh/Chal Ka Chal – 1986
- Samdhin Tere/Tere Liye – 1986
