= List of Indo-Guyanese people =

The following is a list of prominent Indo-Guyanese people.

== Notable Indo-Guyanese ==
=== Politics ===
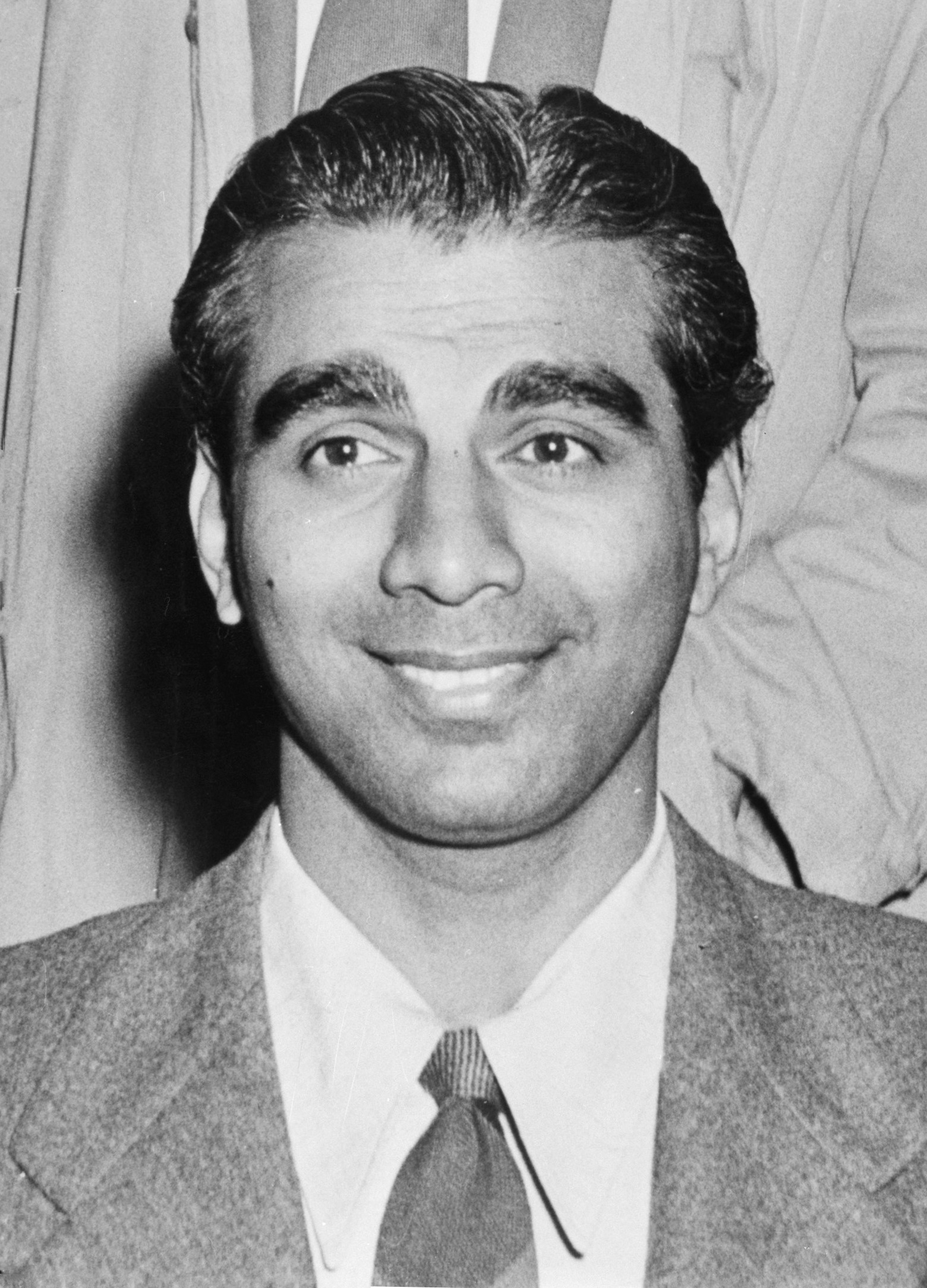
Cheddi Jagan, President of Guyana from 1992 to 1997

- Irfaan Ali, President of Guyana
- Waheed Alli, Baron Alli, life peer in the British House of Lords
- Mohabir Anil Nandlall, Attorney, politician.
- Shaik Baksh, Minister of Education
- Isahak Basir, Member of Parliament
- Vickram Bharrat, politician
- Ranji Chandisingh, former Vice President of Guyana
- Vincent Teekah, former PYO Chairman, Minister of Education and Culture.
- Ronald Gajraj, politician
- Cheddi Jagan, former President of Guyana, dentist, and the Father of the Nation
- Bharrat Jagdeo, Vice President of Guyana, former President of Guyana, and former Prime Minister of Guyana
- Syed Kamall, British MEP for London 2005 - 2019
- Edward Luckhoo, politician and Governor-General of British Guiana and Acting President of Guyana
- Lionel Luckhoo, politician and lawyer
- Gina Miller, British lawyer who took the UK Government to court over its handling of Brexit negotiations
- Manzoor Nadir, Speaker of the National Assembly of Guyana
- Moses Nagamootoo, former Prime Minister of Guyana
- Sase Narain, former Speaker of the National Assembly of Guyana
- Shiw Sahai Naraine, former Vice President of Guyana and engineer
- Reepu Daman Persaud, former Vice President of Guyana and Hindu pandit
- Balram Singh Rai, politician
- Khemraj Ramjattan, former Vice President of Guyana and former Minister of Public Security
- Shridath Ramphal, former Commonwealth Secretary General
- Deolatchmee Ramotar, former First Lady of Guyana
- Donald Ramotar, former President of Guyana
- Bishwaishwar Ramsaroop, former Vice President of Guyana
- Peter Ramsaroop, politician
- Kayman Sankar, politician and rice farmer
- Mohamed Shahabuddeen, former Vice President of Guyana and judge
- Doodnauth Singh, former Attorney General of Guyana
- Lutchman Sooknandan, former Director of Public Prosecutions of Belize and Honorary Consul of Guyana in Belize
- Tara Singh Varma, Dutch politician
- Mark Persaud, Lawyer Twice elected to the National Executive of Liberal Party of Canada

=== Academics ===
- David Dabydeen, professor at the University of Warwick and historian
- Clem Seecharan, professor and Caribbean historian
- Bertrand Ramcharan, former UN High Commissioner for Human Rights
- Bishnodat Persaud, professor at the University of the West Indies and former Director of the Commonwealth Secretariat
- Jamal Deen, Distinguished University Professor, McMaster University, Canada.
- Adam Rutherford, Geneticist and science populariser, University College London.
- Katharine Birbalsingh, teacher and education reform advocate.

=== Business ===
- Stanley Praimnath, bank executive and survivor of the September 11 attacks

=== Medicine ===
- Deborah Persaud, virologist, named among the world's most influential people in the Time 100 in 2013

=== Arts and entertainment ===
- Raymond Ablack, Canadian actor
- Anjulie, Canadian singer-songwriter
- Gaiutra Bahadur, writer
- Dave Baksh, lead guitarist of the Canadian band Sum 41 (also plays with Brown Brigade)
- Shakira Caine, actress, fashion model, and former Miss Guyana
- Mahadai Das, poet
- Melanie Fiona, Canadian singer
- Rhona Fox, actress
- Terry Gajraj, chutney singer
- Emma Heming, Maltese model
- Harischandra Khemraj, writer
- Laxmi Kallicharan, writer
- Isabella Laughland, British actress
- Suchitra Mattai, Guyanese-born American contemporary artist
- Avi Nash, American actor
- Priyanka (stage name of Mark Suknanan), Canadian television presenter, drag artist, and winner of Canada's Drag Race Season 1
- Sandhja, Finnish singer
- Melinda Shankar, Canadian actress
- Nandini Sharan, bhajan singer and wife of Hari Om Sharan
- "Princess Anisa" Singh, chutney-soca singer
- Shana Yardan, poet
- Gordon Warnecke, British actor
- Jacob Scipio, British actor
- Tasie Lawrence, British actor

=== Sports ===
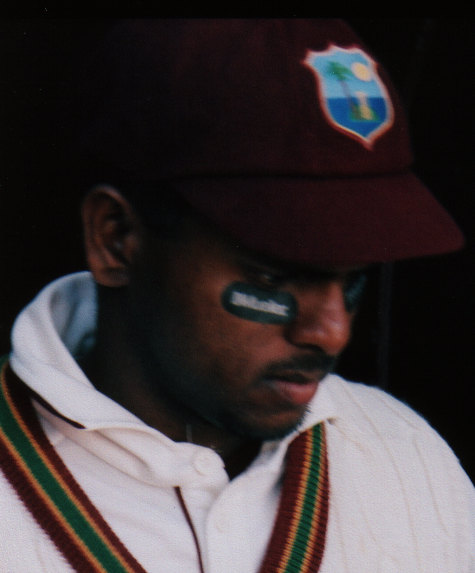
Shivnarine Chanderpaul

- Clive Lloyd, West Indian Cricketer
- Andreas Athanasiou, Canadian NHL player for the Chicago Blackhawks
- Faoud Bacchus, West Indian cricketer
- Shivnarine Chanderpaul, former captain of the West Indies cricket team
- Narsingh Deonarine, West Indian cricketer
- Rohan Kanhai, former captain of the West Indies cricket team
- Alvin Kallicharran, former captain of the West Indies cricket team
- Mahendra Nagamootoo, West Indian cricketer
- Kriskal Persaud, chess player
- Harry Prowell, Marathon Olympian and British West Indies Champion in long-distance running
- Mark Ramprakash, former England cricket player
- Ramnaresh Sarwan, former captain of the West Indies cricket team
- Dhanraj Singh, boxer
- Devendra Bishoo, West Indian cricketer
- Beni Sankar, businessman and former cricket player
- Nezam Hafiz, cricketer and victim of the September 11 attacks
- Paul Stalteri, former soccer player
- Gudakesh Motie, West Indian cricketer
- Tagenarine Chanderpaul, West Indian cricketer

=== Religion and philosophy ===
- Maya Tiwari, Hindu spiritual teacher
- Shabir Ally, Muslim imam

=== Criminality ===
- Shaheed "Roger" Khan, druglord and head of Phantom Squad
