= Chutney soca =

Syncretic music genre

- Stylistic origins: Soca - Chutney music
- Cultural origins: late 1980s, Indian towns and villages of Trinidad and Tobago and the Caribbean
- Typical instruments: Bulbul Tarang, Dhantal, Dholak, Harmonium, Khartal, Manjira, Mandolin, Tabla, Tassa beats, Bass, Drums, Piano, Guitar, Vocals

Other topics
- Music of Trinidad and Tobago - Music of Guyana - Music of Suriname

In Trinidad and Tobago, Guyana, and Suriname, chutney soca music is a crossover style music genre that blends soca and calypso with chutney music—a genre rooted in Indo-Trinidadian culture. It incorporates English, Hindustani, and Hinglish lyrics, using Western instruments such as the guitar, piano, drum set, and Indian instruments such as the dholak, harmonium, tabla, and dhantal.

The term chutney soca was coined by Drupatee Ramgoonai of Trinidad and Tobago in 1987 in her first album entitled Chutney Soca, with a mix of Trinidadian English and Trinidadian Hindustani versions of the songs. The current style of spelling of the term was not established then and she spelt it as "Chatnee Soca". The following year her hit "Roll up de Tassa" was instrumental in creating a commercial market for this type of music internationally. Drupatee has spoken about the blending of Afro and Indo melodies and rhythms in songs such as "Chatnee Soca" and "Hotter than ah Chulha". Chutney is a melody and soca is a beat. Drupatee used an ancient Indian melody called a lawnee with the soca beat in her rendition of "O Tassawalley" and has released a legacy of chutney soca music.

== History ==
Chutney soca is a prime example of how Indo-Trinidadians have established roots in Trinidad and have created an original, syncretic artform. This fusion was originally pioneered by Lord Shorty in the 1960s and 1970s and its later branding resulted from the intervention of Indo-Trinidadians into soca music in the 1980s, the addition of chutney soca to the island's musical life signified a consolidation of the East Indian influence on Trinidadian culture and politics, particularly during the 1990s. It was during the 1980s and 1990s that Trinidadian musicians, performing in the popular style of calypso and its offshoot, soca, began to incorporate Indian themes into their lyrics. A significant example of this is the song "Sundar Popo", by Black Stalin. This song, whose whimsical lyrics concern a veteran Indian singer, won Black Stalin the coveted Calypso Monarch Prize in February 1995. Although it was neither in chutney style nor in Hindustani, "Sundar Popo" was labelled chutney soca because of its theme. Similar efforts followed in the wake of 30 May 1995, which marked the anniversary of the first arrival of "indenturees" in Trinidad and was designated by the island's government as Indian Arrival Day.

Chutney soca's rise in popularity through the mid to late 1990s was expedited by its changing role in Trinidad's Carnival celebration. The 1995–96 Carnival season saw the establishment of the Chutney Soca Monarch Competition and the performance of a number of chutney socas during the calypso soca competition by creole musicians, including Marcia Miranda, Tony Ricardo, Chris Garcia, Brother Marvin, and Luta. Embraced as it was by non-Indian performers, who abandoned formal Indianisms, sang solely in English and emphasized the soca beat, chutney soca became a national fad. The Chutney Soca Monarch competition has become the largest and most important Indo-Caribbean concert of its kind in the world. Today its production costs more than US$1 million annually. It has crowned many champions from 1996 to 2010 which include Sonny Mann, Rikki Jai, Heeralal Rampartap, Rooplal Girdharie, and Ravi Bissambhar. Since the late 1990s, chutney soca has spawned the similar styles of chutney rap, chutney jhumar and chutney lambada, dance music whose Indo-Caribbean themes are mixed with Bombay film music and American popular music.

== Origin ==
The father of chutney soca is Garfield Blackman, who rose to fame as Lord Shorty with his 1963 hit "Clock and Dagger" and took on the name "Ras Shorty-I" in 1980 after a spiritual change in direction. He started out writing songs and performing in the calypso genre in the 1960s. Shorty's first recording in 1962 was a calypso with a strong East Indian influence called "Long Mango". He next revisited the fusion of an East Indian style melody with calypso in a song called "Indian Singers" in 1966. In the early 1970s in an effort to modernize calypso, Shorty began regularly experimenting with it including his blending of Calypso with local Indian music and rhythms. Shorty added Indian instruments, including the dholak, tabla and dhantal. Shorty experimented with fusing calypso and elements of Indo-Caribbean music for nearly a decade before unleashing "the soul of calypso" – soca music.

Chutney soca's development as a musical genre included its fusion with calypso and Indian musical instruments – particularly the dholak, tabla and dhantal – as demonstrated in Lord Shorty's classic compositions "Ïndrani" and "Shanti Om".
