= Guyanese Americans =

Americans of Guyanese birth or descent

Total population
- 237,649 (2019)

Regions with significant populations
- Majority in states include New York, Massachusetts, Pennsylvania, New Jersey, Connecticut, Rhode Island, Florida and Georgia; Smaller numbers in parts of the country including Illinois, Wisconsin, Delaware, Maryland, Minnesota, Texas, Washington, Colorado and California

Languages
- English; Guyanese Creole; Guyanese Hindustani; Dutch; Portuguese; Chinese; Akawaio; Macushi; Waiwai; Arawak; Patamona; Warrau; Carib; Wapishana; Arekuna

Religion
- Hinduism; Christianity; Islam

Related ethnic groups
- Trinidadian and Tobagonian Americans; Surinamese Americans; Indigenous peoples in Guyana; Afro-Caribbean Americans; African Americans; Indo-Caribbean Americans; Arab Americans; Liberian Americans; South African Americans; Ghanaian Americans; Nigerian Americans; Sierra Leonean Americans; Gambian Americans; Indian Americans; Chinese Americans; Portuguese Americans; Native Americans

Guyanese Americans are American people with Guyanese ancestry or immigrants who were born in Guyana. Guyana is home to people of many different national, ethnic, and religious origins. As of 2019, there are 231,649 Guyanese Americans currently living in the United States. The majority of Guyanese live in New York City – some 140,000 – making them the fifth-largest foreign-born population in the city (if combined with the population of Trinidadians in NYC, in 2013).

== History ==
After the independence of Guyana from the United Kingdom, in 1966, Guyanese immigration to the United States increased dramatically. Political and economic uncertainty, and the internal strife two years earlier as well as a radical change in US immigration policy opening up opportunities to non-Europeans prompted many Guyanese who could make the move to seek opportunities abroad. An average of 6,080 people a year emigrated from Guyana between 1969 and 1976, increasing to an average of 14,400 between 1976 and 1981.

Many of the first Guyanese immigrants to the United States were of African descent. They were women who were recruited as domestic workers or nursing assistants. Prior to the Immigration and Nationality Act of 1952 Guyanese of Asian descent faced immigration restrictions by the Asiatic Barred Zone. However, many Guyanese who had studied in the US in the mid 20th century or earlier stayed on in the US; although some like Cheddi Jagan returned to Guyana. Shirley Chisholm's father represents one of the earliest of Guyanese immigrants to the US during the 20th century; emigration from Guyana at that time was mostly to Caribbean or Commonwealth countries.

Many Indo-Guyanese immigrants emigrated to New York City during the upheavals of the 1970s and 1980s, a group descended from the original Indian indentured servants that arrived to Guyana in the early 1800s after the abolishing of slavery by the British Empire.

== Demographics ==
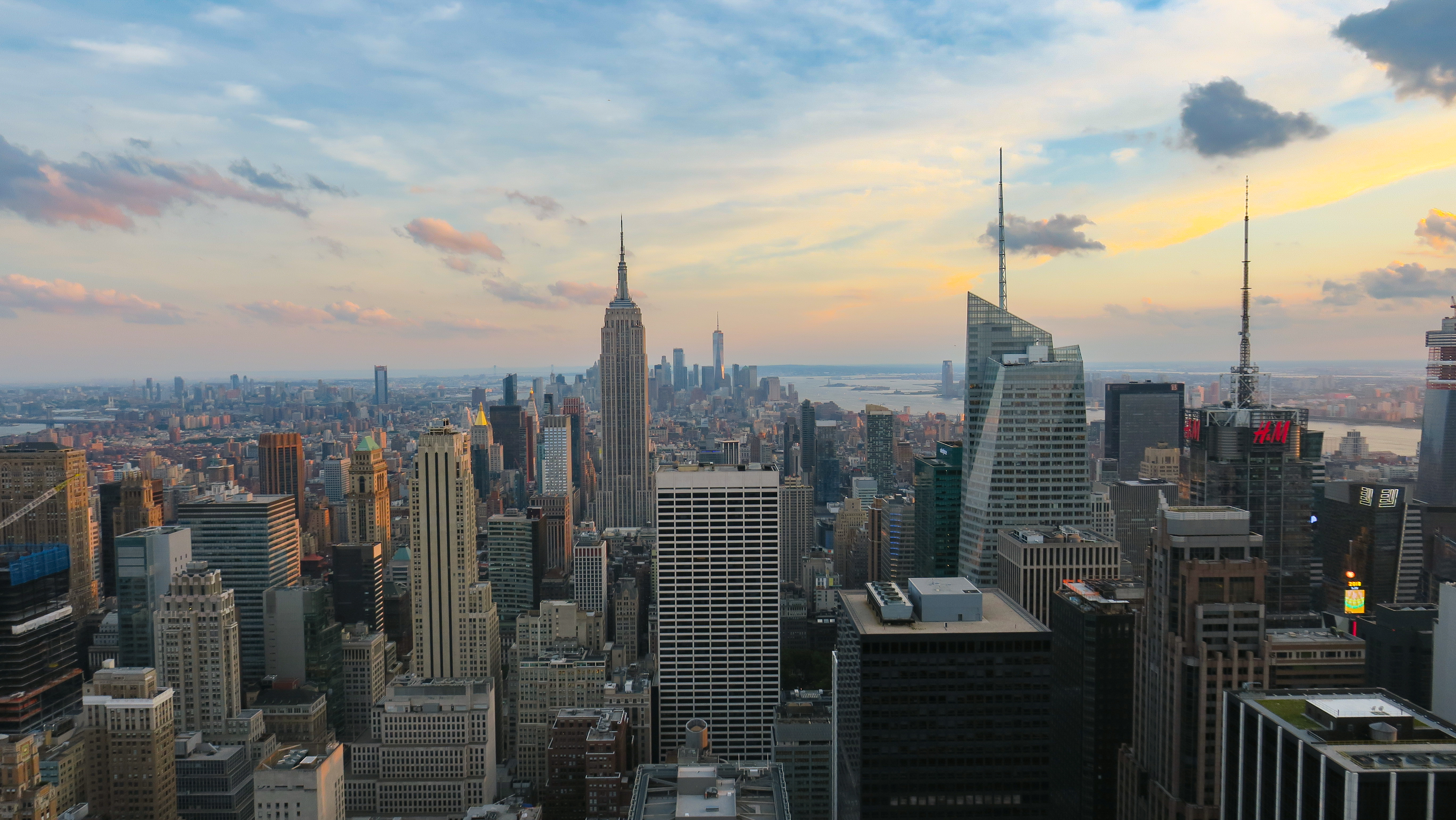
The New York City metropolitan area is home to the largest Guyanese population in the United States.

The United States has the highest number of Guyanese people outside of Guyana. The Guyanese-American community mostly consists of people of Indian and African origins although there are a few Indigenous Guyanese living in the United States.

As of 1990, 80 percent of Guyanese Americans lived in the northeastern United States, especially around New York City, which is home to over 140,000 people of Guyanese descent.

Many Indo-Guyanese immigrants emigrated to New York City during the upheavals of the 1970s and 1980s and settled in South Richmond Hill. The 2000 census identified 24,662 people in Richmond Hill who were born in Guyana, the majority of whom were of Indian descent. The large concentration of Indo-Guyanese residents in Richmond Hill and the neighboring South Ozone Park, has led the area along Liberty Avenue to be referred to as "Little Guyana", with the portion of the avenue being officially co-named Little Guyana Avenue in 2021. The majority of NYC's Afro-Guyanese population lives in Brooklyn's West Indian neighborhoods, most notably Flatbush and Canarsie.

Other areas in the U.S. with significant Guyanese populations include Western New York (Buffalo and Rochester), the northern New Jersey cities of Irvington, South Plainfield, Orange and East Orange; and parts of central Florida (Ocala, Orlando, Kissimmee, Southchase, Bay Hill, Clarcona, Minneola, Winter Garden, Winter Park, Windermere, Four Corners, Tampa, Brandon, Orlo Vista, Oakland, and Verona Walk) and southern Florida (Lauderhill, Sunrise, Plantation, Margate, Hollywood, Tamarac, Coral Springs, Oakland Park, Pembroke Pines, Miramar, Fort Lauderdale, North Lauderdale, Lauderdale Lakes, Coconut Creek, Parkland, The Acreage, Loxahatchee, West Palm Beach, Lake Worth Beach, Lantana, Wellington, Boynton Beach, Jupiter, Homestead, Cutler Bay, Miami Gardens, North Miami, and Port St. Lucie). Smaller populations can also be found in The Bronx, New York; Westchester County; Rockland County; Nassau County; Schenectady; Emerald Lakes; Olanta; Lincoln Park; and Bladensburg.

Indo-Guyanese are mostly Hindu, but some are Muslims or Christians.

== Politics ==
Guyanese have organized many of the U.S. Caribbean organizations. There are many associations of nurses and police from Guyana. Guyanese Americans have organized, through their churches, with other ethnic groups to promote knowledge about and find solutions for the problems in their neighborhoods and have entered local politics. Guyanese Americans are the 5th largest immigrant group in NYC. As of 2017, no New York City Council members were there of Guyanese descent.

Shirley Chisholm was the only Congresswoman of Guyanese descent in American history, as well as the first Black woman elected to the United States Congress.

Helen M. Marshall, who for three terms served as Borough President of Queens from 2002 to 2014, was born to Afro-Guyanese parents from British Guiana.

== Associations ==
Some of the associations are the Guyana Cultural Association of New York, Indo-Caribbean Alliance, The Indo-Caribbean Federation of North America, and the Association of Guyanese-Americans. Around springtime, the Hindu Indo-Guyanese population in Richmond Hill, Queens traditionally hold a Phagwah Holi Festival and Celebration and during the time of Diwali they have a motorcade on Liberty Avenue with a show.

== Relations with Guyana ==
The Guyanese-American community has close ties with Guyana and sends financial aid back to family members. There are ongoing academic exchanges between Guyana and the United States. The Journal of the Caribbean is a Caribbean newspaper that reports on the Indo-Guyanese and other Caribbean communities and on events in Guyana. This newspaper is published weekly and distributed throughout North America. The publications of these papers are written in English, with some publications also available in other languages.

== Notable people ==
=== Academics ===
- Kerwin Kofi Charles

=== Actors ===
- Yaani King
- Dawnn Lewis
- Avi Nash
- Derek Luke
- Nicole Narain – Model and actress
- C. C. H. Pounder
- Sean Patrick Thomas
- Marsha Thomason

=== Attorneys ===
- Edon Warslie

=== Business ===
- Andrew Lokenauth – Finance
- Donnel Baird – Entrepreneur
- Edual Ahmad – Real estate
- Stanley Praimnath (September 11 survivor)

=== Historians ===
- Ivan van Sertima
- Fred D'Aguiar

=== Medicine ===
- Deborah Persaud – Virologist

=== Other ===
- Yonnette Fleming – Urban farmer

=== Politicians ===
- Shirley Chisholm
- Cheddi Jagan
- Mel King
- John L. Sampson
- Jabari Brisport
- Helen M. Marshall
- Roxanne Persaud

=== Pop culture ===
- Anjulie
- Red Café
- Godfrey Cambridge
- Rafael Cameron
- Kevin Darlington
- Oscar Dathorne
- Smoke DZA
- Rhona Fox
- Alyce Fraser Denny
- Saint Jhn
- Aminta Kilawan (Guyanese parents) – Lawyer, activist and writer
- Lord Jamar
- Steve Massiah
- Thara Prashad
- Joy-Ann Reid (Guyanese mother)
- Alana Shipp
- Terry Gajraj
- "Princess Anisa" Singh (Guyanese parents)
- Wendell Holland
- Giveon (Guyanese mother)
- 22Gz

=== Sports ===
- Maritza Correia – Olympic swimmer
- Laura Creavalle – Guyanese-born Canadian/American professional bodybuilder
- Ezekiel Jackson – WWE professional wrestler and bodybuilder
- Mark Teixeira – Major League baseball player, New York Yankees
- Darren Collison – NBA player son of two world class Guyanese athletes
- Warren Creavalle – Soccer player
- Cyril Langevine (born 1998), Guyanese–American basketball player in the Israeli Basketball Premier League
- Calvin Ridley – NFL player for the Atlanta Falcons

=== Visual artists ===
- Theresa Chromati (born 1992) – painter
- Suchitra Mattai (born 1973) – contemporary textile artist

=== Writers ===
- Kingsley O. Harrop-Williams
- Gaiutra Bahadur
- Natalie Hopkinson
- Rosalind Kilkenny McLymont
- Princess Ariana Austin Makonnen

== See also ==
- Guyanese people
- West Indian Americans
- African Americans
- Guyanese Britons
- Guyana–United States relations
- Caribbean immigration to New York City
