= Rakesh Yankaran =

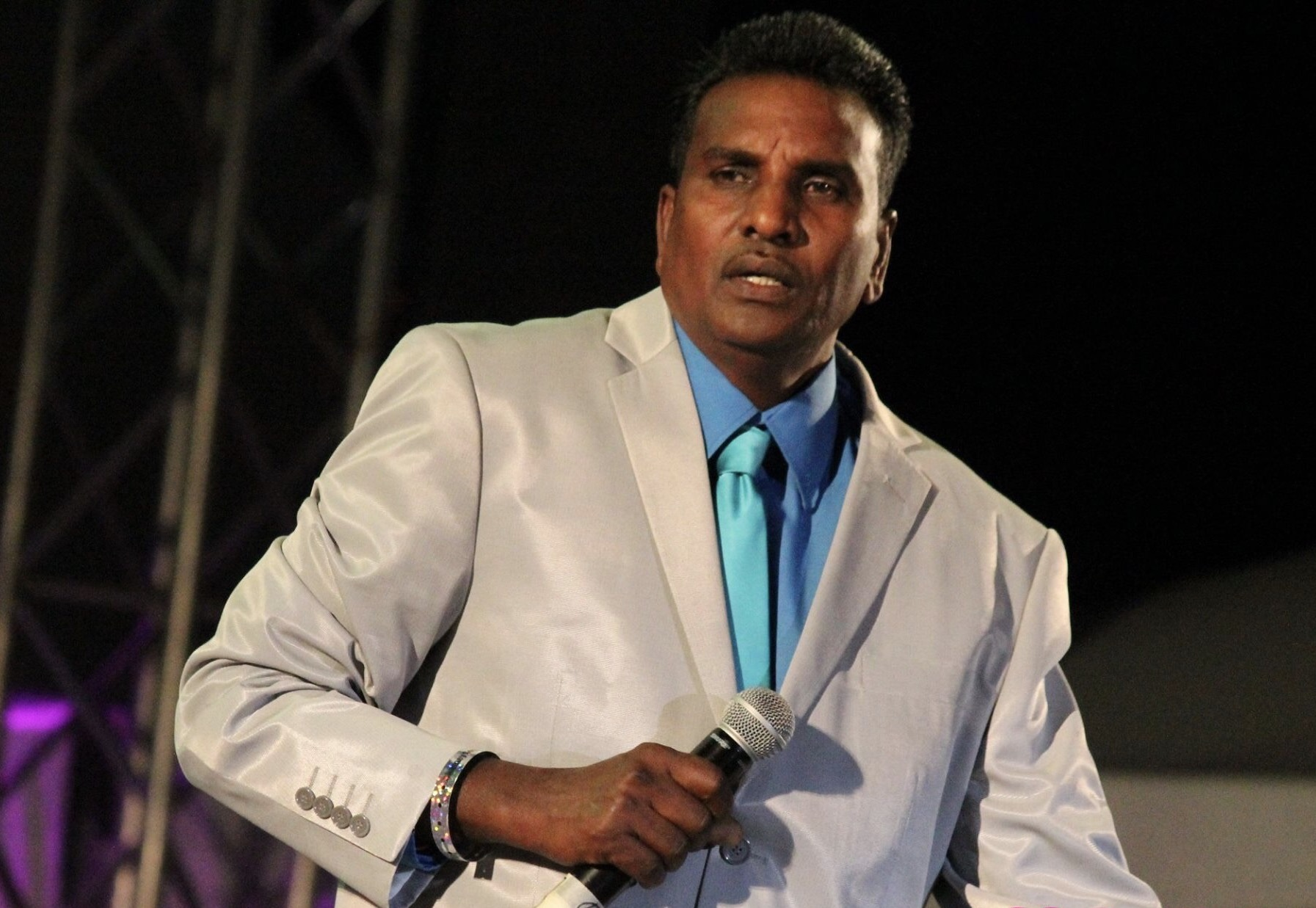
- Rakesh Yankaran performing at the Chutney Soca Monarch.

Background information
- Also known as: The Raja
- Born: Rakesh Yankaran; 3 December 1959 (age 66); Brickfield, Carapichaima, Trinidad and Tobago
- Origin: Central Trinidad
- Genres: Chutney, Bhajans, Kirtan, Indian classical, Indian folk
- Occupation: Singer
- Instruments: Vocals, Harmonium, Dholak, Tabla, Dhantal
- Years active: 1974-present
- Label: Praimsingh Productions

Rakesh Yankaran (pronounced [rɑːkeːɕə jəⁿkərənə]), nicknamed The Raja (born 03 December 1959) is a Trinidadian musician. He is the son of the late Indian classical musician, Isaac Yankarran and brother of the late Indian classical and chutney musicians Anand, Suresh, and Sharm Yankaran. His grandfather came from Andhra Pradesh, India to Trinidad and Tobago during the indentured labour times. He is a self-taught musician. As a child, young Rakesh loved to listen to his father sing. As a teen he started to play music himself. Today he is a professional chutney artist. He can play the Indian instruments tabla, dholak, harmonium, dhantal, and the tassa drum.

Rakesh Yankaran was born in Brickfield, Carapichaima, Trinidad and Tobago to a Hindu family and is of Telugu and Bhojpuri Indian descent. He began his career in 1974, but first gained national acclaim in 1991 with Dadiyya Moday Lay Lay. Other hits include Mousie, Dulahin Chale Sasural and Naroro Ray. He won the National Chutney Monarch competition in 1996 and 1997 and 2008, and the National Traditional Chutney Monarch in 2008. He has collaborated with artists like Ravi B, Raymond Ramnarine, Sam Boodram, etc.

Some of his albums include but are not limited to:

"D Raja is Boss", "Geh Tem Raja", "Get in D' Soor with De Raja", "Bhajan Ratnavali", "Shakti Vandana", "Jai Kali".
