= Terry Gajraj =

- Born: Terry Vivekanand Gajraj; Fyrish, East Berbice-Corentyne, Guyana
- Other names: D' Guyana Baboo; Terry G
- Musical career
- Origin: Guyana
- Genres: Chutney and Chutney-soca
- Years active: 1989–present
- Label: Mohabir Records
- Website: terrygajraj.com

Terry Vivekanand Gajraj is a Guyanese chutney and chutney-soca artist.

== Career ==
Born in the village of Fyrish, near the Corentyne River, in Guyana, he is the eldest of three children and son of a school teacher. Gajraj is a Hindu of Indian descent. Gajraj began performing at the age of 5 with the Dil Bahar Orchestra. He learned to play the harmonium and drums, and went on to work with the Star Rhythm Combo, the Original Pioneers, and the Melody Makers, before working as a teacher in his 20s at a high school in Georgetown.

In the late 1980s, inspired by Sundar Popo and the increasing popularity of chutney, he decided to pursue a career in music, and he relocated to New York. After initially working as part of local bands, he launched a solo career in 1990, releasing the album Soca Lambada, which brought him immediate success. He had a local hit in 1992 with "Tun Tun Dance", and followed it with his third album, Guyana Baboo & Pack Up: New York, split with David Ramoutar, which was also a success, 'Guyana Baboo' being synonymous with Gajraj ever since.

His popularity spread to Trinidad and Tobago, where he performed at the Trinidad Spektakula festival and appeared on national television. In 1995 he became the first Guyanese artist to perform at the T&T carnival. He's also the first singer from the Caribbean to perform at India's Bollywood Music Awards.

Between 1990 and 2000 he release a total of 14 albums.

In 2009 he collaborated with Dheeraj Gayaram on the stage show West Indian Dreams.

In 2015 he was nominated in the 'Male Soca Chutney Artiste of the Year' category at the International Soca & Chutney Awards.

== Discography ==
- Soca Lambada (1990), Mohabir
- Caribana '92 (1992), Mohabir
- Guyana Baboo & Pack Up: New York (1993), Mohabir - with David Ramoutar
- Tun Tun Dance/Guyana Baboo 2 (1994) - with Apache Waria
- Phagwah Songs (1994), Mohabir
- Roti & Dall (1995), Mohabir
- Baboo Bruk Dem Up (1996), Mohabir
- Funky Chatni (1996), Mohabir
- Summer Jam (1997), Mohabir
- Sweet Love Songs (1998), Mohabir
- Boom (1998), Mohabir
- Christmas Dancemix (1998), RP
- Sweet Love Songs vol. 2 (1999), Mohabir
- Sweet Love Songs, vol. 3 (2000), Mohabir
- Voice of Guyana, Mohabir
- Berbice River,

Compilations

- X (2000), Mohabir

== See also ==
- Guyanese Americans
- Indians in the New York City metropolitan area
- List of Indo-Guyanese people
- Indo-Caribbean Americans
