= Ramnarine =

Ramnarine is a surname of Indian origin. Notable people with the surname include:

- Dinanath Ramnarine (born 1975), Trinidadian cricketer
- Raymond Ramnarine, Trinidadian singer
- Ria Ramnarine (born 1978), Trinidadian boxer
- Dylan Ramnarine (born 2000), Human Resources Assistant
