= Caribbean Hindustani =

Indo-Aryan language spoken in the Caribbean

- कैरेबियाई हिंदुस्तानी 𑂍𑂶𑂩𑂵𑂥𑂱𑂨𑂰𑂆⸱𑂯𑂱𑂁𑂠𑂳𑂮𑂹𑂞𑂰𑂢𑂲 کَیریبئائی ہندوستانی
- Caribbean Hindustani written in the Latin, Devanagari, Kaithi, and Perso-Arabic (Nastaliq calligraphy) scripts
- Region: Caribbean
- Ethnicity: Indo-Caribbean people; Indo-Caribbean people in the Netherlands; Indo-Caribbean Americans; British Indo-Caribbean people; Indo-Caribbean Canadians
- Native speakers: 150,000 in Suriname (2018); ~1,600 in Trinidad and Tobago (in 2003); 299,400 in all countries (2006–2019)
- Language family: Indo-European: Indo-Iranian; Indo-Aryan; Eastern and Central; Bihari and Eastern Hindi; Bhojpuri and Awadhi; Caribbean Hindustani
- Early forms: Proto-Indo-European: Proto-Indo-Iranian; Proto-Indo-Aryan; Vedic Sanskrit; Classical Sanskrit; Magadhi and Ardhamagadhi Prakrit (Note: Bhojpuri is descended from Magadhi Prakrit and Awadhi is descended from Ardhamagadhi Prakrit); Magadhan and Ardhamagadhi Apabhraṃśa (Note: Bhojpuri is descended from Magadhan Apabhraṃśa and Awadhi is descended from Ardhamagadhi Apabhraṃśa); Abahattha (Note: Only Bhojpuri is descended from Abahattha, not Awadhi. Awadhi comes straight from Ardhamagadhi Apabhraṃśa); Bhojpuri and Awadhi
- Dialects: Trinidadian Hindustani; Guyanese Hindustani; Sarnami Hindustani
- Writing system: Devanagari; Latin-Roman; Kaithi; Perso-Arabic (Note: Nastaliq calligraphic hand, Urdu alphabet)

Official status
- Regulated by: Trinidad and Tobago (Caribbean Hindustani Inc.); Suriname (Sarnami Bol Inc.)

Language codes
- ISO 639-3: hns
- Glottolog: cari1275

Caribbean Hindustani (Devanagari: कैरेबियाई हिंदुस्तानी; Kaithi: 𑂍𑂶𑂩𑂵𑂥𑂱𑂨𑂰𑂆⸱𑂯𑂱𑂁𑂠𑂳𑂮𑂹𑂞𑂰𑂢𑂲; Nastaliq: کَیریبیائی ہندوستانی) is an Indo-Aryan language spoken by Indo-Caribbean people and the Indo-Caribbean diaspora. It is a koiné language mainly based on the Bhojpuri and Awadhi languages. These were the most-spoken languages by the Indians who came as immigrants to the Caribbean from India as indentured labourers. It is closely related to Fiji Hindi, Mauritian Bhojpuri, and the Hindustani-Bhojpuri spoken in South Africa.

Because a majority of people came from the Bhojpur-Purvanchal region in Bihar, Uttar Pradesh and Jharkhand, and the Awadh region in Uttar Pradesh, Caribbean Hindustani is most influenced by Bhojpuri, Awadhi and other Eastern Hindi-Bihari dialects. Hindustani (Standard Hindi-Standard Urdu) has also influenced the language due to the arrival of Bollywood films, music, and other media from India. It also has a minor influence from Tamil and other South Asian languages. The language has also borrowed many words from Dutch and English in Suriname and Guyana, and English and French in Trinidad and Tobago. Many words unique to Caribbean Hindustani have been created to cater for the new environment that Indo-Caribbean people now live in. After the introduction of Standard Hindustani to the Caribbean, Caribbean Hindustani was seen by many Indo-Caribbean people as a broken version of Hindi, however due to later academic research it was seen as deriving from Bhojpuri, Awadhi, and other dialects and was in fact not a broken language, but its own unique language mainly deriving from Bhojpuri and Awadhi, and not the Khariboli dialect like Standard Hindi and Urdu did, thus the difference.

Caribbean Hindustani is spoken as a vernacular by Indo-Caribbean people, independent of their religious background, though Hindus tend to incorporate more Sanskrit derived vocabulary and Muslims tend to incorporate more Persian, Arabic, and Turkic derived vocabulary, similar to the Standard Hindi-Urdu divide of the Hindustani language. When written, the Devanagari script following the Hindi alphabet, is used by Hindus, while some Muslims tend to use the Perso-Arabic script in the Nastaliq calligraphic hand following the Urdu alphabet; historically, the Kaithi script was also used. However, due to the decline in the language these scripts are not widely used and most often the Latin script is used due to familiarity and easiness.

Chutney music, chutney soca, chutney parang, baithak gana, folk music, classical music, semi-classical, some Hindu religious songs, some Muslim religious songs, and even some Indian Christian religious songs are sung in Caribbean Hindustani, sometimes being mixed with English in the Anglophone Caribbean or Dutch in Suriname and the Dutch Caribbean.

== Guyanese Hindustani ==
The Caribbean Hindustani of Guyana is known as Guyanese Hindustani, Guyanese Bhojpuri, Puraniya Hindi, or Aili Gaili. It is spoken by some members in a community of 300,000 Indo-Guyanese, mostly by the older generation, Hindu priests, and imams. The Nickerian-Berbician Hindustani dialect of Guyanese Hindustani and Sarnami is spoken in East Berbice-Corentyne in Guyana and the neighboring district of Nickerie in Suriname.

== Trinidadian Hindustani ==
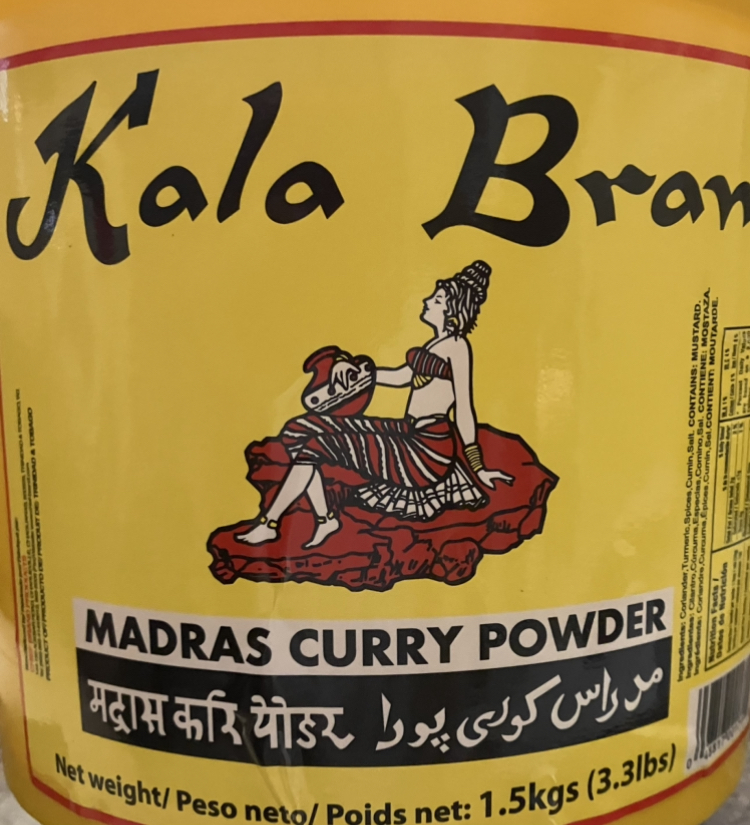
Trinidadian Hindustani text in the Devanagari and Perso-Arabic script on a bucket of curry powder from Trinidad and Tobago.

The variant that is spoken in Trinidad and Tobago is known as Trinidadian Hindustani, Trinidadian Bhojpuri, Trinidadian Hindi, Indian, Plantation Hindustani, or Gaon ke Bolee (Village Speech). A majority of the early Indian indentured immigrants spoke the Bhojpuri and Awadhi dialects, which later formed into Trinidadian Hindustani. In 1935, Indian movies began showing to audiences in Trinidad. Most of the Indian movies were in the Standard Hindustani (Hindi-Urdu) dialect and this modified Trinidadian Hindustani slightly by adding Standard Hindi and Urdu phrases and vocabulary to Trinidadian Hindustani. Indian movies also revitalized Hindustani among Indo-Trinidadian and Tobagonians. The British colonial government and estate owners had disdain and contempt for Hindustani and Indian languages in Trinidad. Due to this, many Indians saw it as a broken language keeping them in poverty and bound to the cane fields, and did not pass it on as a first language, but rather as a heritage language, as they favored English as a way out. Around the mid to late 1960s the lingua franca of Indo-Trinidadian and Tobagonians switched from Trinidadian Hindustani to a sort of Hindinized version of English. Today Hindustani survives on through Indo-Trinidadian and Tobagonian musical forms such as, Bhajan, Indian classical music, Indian folk music, Filmi, Pichakaree, Chutney, Chutney soca, and Chutney parang. As of 2003, there were about 15,600 Trinidadians who spoke Trinidadian Hindustani, 90 % of them as a second language. As of 2011, there were about 10,000 who spoke Standard Hindi. Many Indo-Trinidadians and Tobagonians today speak a type of Hinglish that consists of Trinidadian and Tobagonian English that is heavily laced with Trinidadian Hindustani vocabulary and phrases and many Indo-Trinidadians and Tobagonians can recite phrases or prayers in Hindustani today. There are many places in Trinidad and Tobago that have names of Hindustani origin. Some phrases and vocabulary have even made their way into the mainstream English and English Creole dialect of the country. World Hindi Day is celebrated each year on 10 January with events organized by the National Council of Indian Culture, Hindi Nidhi Foundation, Indian High Commission, Mahatma Gandhi Institute for Cultural Co-operation, and the Sanatan Dharma Maha Sabha.

== Sarnami Hindustani ==
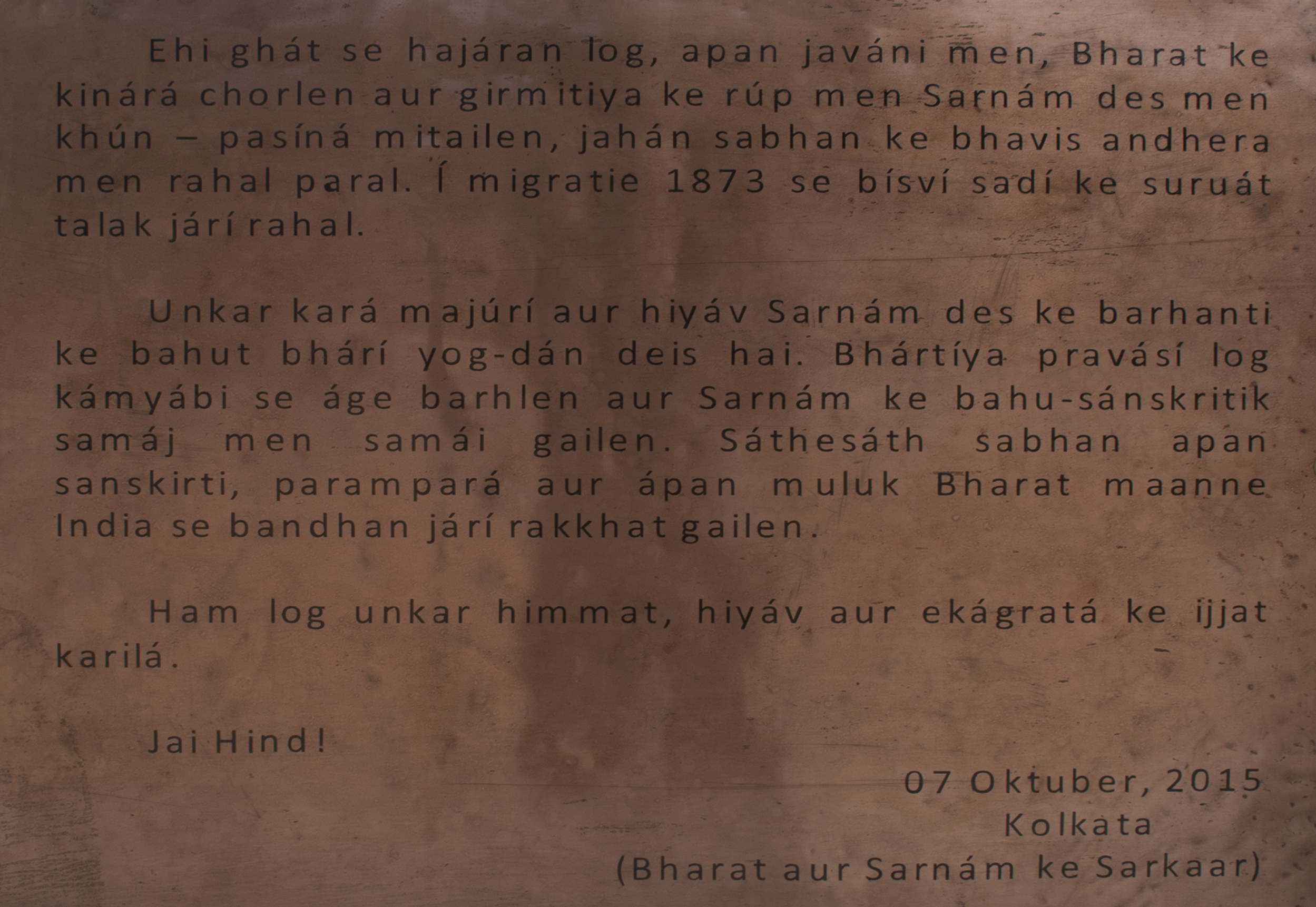
Sarnami Hindustani (Roman script) plaque at Suriname Memorial, Garden Reach, Kolkata, West Bengal, India

Sarnami or Sarnami Hindoestani or Sarnami Hindustani meaning Surinamese Hindustani is the third-most spoken language in Suriname after Dutch and Sranan Tongo (the two lingua francas). It developed as a fusion of Bihari and Eastern Hindi languages, specifically Bhojpuri, Awadhi, and – to a lesser degree – Magahi. Most scholars agree that Bhojpuri is the main contributor in the formation of Sarnami. It is mainly spoken by and within Suriname's Indo-Surinamese (ca. 27% of the population) community and therefore it is not considered to be a third lingua franca. While Sarnami is mostly a language of informal daily communication, the traditional prestige language of the community is Standard Hindi–Urdu in either of its literary variants: Hindi (Modern Standard Hindi) for Hindus, and Urdu for Muslims. This is similar to how Jamaican Patois is used informally and Jamaican Standard English or the Queen's English is seen as more prestigious. Baithak Gana is the most famous genre of music sung in Sarnami Hindustani.

=== Nickerian-Berbician Hindustani ===
Nickerian-Berbician Hindustani, also called Nickerian Sarnami or Berbician Hindustani, is a unique dialect of Sarnami and Guyanese Bhojpuri-Hindustani that developed in the district of Nickerie in Suriname and the neighboring county of Berbice (present-day East Berbice-Corentyne) in Guyana during the colonial times in the late 19th century to the early 20th century. Even though Suriname's Nickerie and Guyana's Berbice are in different countries separated by the Courantyne River, the groups of descendants of Indian indentured laborers that settled in both areas existed as one Indian community and intermarriage between Indians from Nickerie to Indians in Berbice and vice versa often occurred. The difference in colonial and post-colonial independent history in the two districts led to the Indians in Nickerie in Suriname being able to preserve the dialect, while in Berbice in Guyana it largely died out, however many words and phrases from the dialect were incorporated into the Guyanese English Creole of Berbice. Today the remaining speakers of Guyanese Hindustani are mostly speakers of the Nickerian-Berbician dialect due to the influx of Nickerians in Berbice. Nickerian-Berbician Hindustani is mostly mutually intelligible with the Sarnami spoken in the rest of Suriname, although there are many words from Guyanese English Creole and English. Nickerian-Berbician Hindustani is also mutually intelligible with the Guyanese Hindustani spoken in the rest of Guyana, however unlike Suriname, Indians in Guyana have mostly adopted Guyanese English Creole as their first language and it is spoken mostly by the elderly, Hindu priests, and Indian immigrants from Suriname.

== Research and promotional efforts ==
Early research on the language has been conducted by Motilall Rajvanshi Marhe from Suriname, Peggy Mohan and Noor Kumar Mahabir from Trinidad and Tobago, and Surendra Kumar Gambhir in Guyana. Attempts to preserve the language are being made by Caribbean Hindustani Inc. led by Visham Bhimull, Sarnami Bol Inc. led by Rajsingh Ramanjulu in Suriname, Karen Dass in Trinidad and Tobago, and Harry Hergash in Canada who is originally from Guyana.

== See also ==
- Indo-Caribbean people
- Fiji Hindi
- Mauritian Bhojpuri
- Girmityas
