= Adesh Samaroo =

Trinidadian chutney soca singer

Adesh Samaroo (born in 1982) is a Trinidadian chutney soca singer born in Tacarigua in central Trinidad. He gained notice on the local scene in late 2002 with his song "Rum Till I Die" from the album of the same name.

His second release, titled "Caroni Close Down", played upon the fact that the local sugar cane company, Caroni (1975) Ltd. had recently been shut down. After the success of his third single, "Rajin Jheem Jheem Joom" Samaroo began performing abroad.

Samaroo won the National Chutney Monarch in 2004. The same year, he performed with late Indian performer Kanchan. Samaroo has won a total of eleven awards at the 103 FM Music Awards, six in 2004 and five in 2005. He has also won the World Caribbean Awards and The Sunshine Music Awards.

In April 2005, Samaroo was involved in a major automobile accident that left him in critical condition. He returned to performing seven months later on 12 November 2005 in Skinner Park, San Fernando, Trinidad. The concert was entitled 'The Return Of Adesh, Thanks For Life'.

As of late 2005, Samaroo was working on a fourth album. He completed his album successfully and is once again on the scene.

In March 2016, Samaroo signed exclusively to soca music distributor and label Fox Fuse.
