= Pichakaree =

Pichakaree (or pichakaaree) is an Indo-Trinidadian form of music, which originated in Trinidad and Tobago. It is named after the long syringe-like tubes used to spray abir during Phagwah celebrations.

== Description ==
Pichakaree songs are generally social commentary, and are sung using a mixture of Hindi, English and Bhojpuri words. The musical form was devised by RaviJi, spiritual leader of the Hindu Prachar Kendra, as an Indo-Trinidadian counterpoint to calypso. Pichakaree competitions are an integral part of Phagwa celebrations hosted by the Hindu Prachar Kendra. This has been criticised by Satnarayan Maharaj of the Sanatan Dharma Maha Sabha (the largest Hindu organisation in Trinidad and Tobago), saying that Phagwah is a religious celebration, and "A sacred occasion like Phagwa must not be used to piggy-back behaviour that is adharamic (anti-religious in the Vedic Tradition).

== Relation with tantra ==
There are however Hindus who are open minded to such music and ascribe to the Tantra Tradition of Hinduism.
