= Indo-Caribbean people =

Caribbean people of Indian descent

इंडो-कैरिबियन • 𑂅𑂁𑂙𑂷-𑂍𑂶𑂩𑂱𑂥𑂱𑂨𑂢 • انڈو کیریبین (Caribbean Hindustani) Indo-Caribéens (French) Indo-Caraïbiërs • Hindo(e)stanen (Dutch)

Total population
- c. 2.5 million (2021 est.)

Regions with significant populations
- Trinidad and Tobago: 534,000 (a plurality of the population)
- Guyana: 297,493 (a plurality of the population)
- United States: 232,817 (Indo-Caribbean Americans)
- Netherlands: 200,000 (Dutch Indo-Caribbeans)
- Suriname: 148,443 (a plurality of the population)
- Canada: 100,000 (Indo-Caribbean Canadians)
- United Kingdom: 53,000 (British Indo-Caribbeans)
- Martinique: 36,123
- Guadeloupe: 35,617
- Jamaica: 21,584
- French Guiana: 12,000
- Belize: 7,600
- Saint Vincent and the Grenadines: 5,900
- Saint Lucia: 5,200
- Sint Maarten: 5,170
- Puerto Rico: 4,100
- Barbados: 4,000
- Grenada: 3,900
- Collectivity of Saint Martin: 1,950
- Saint Kitts and Nevis: 1,500
- Cayman Islands: 1,437
- British Virgin Islands: 1,100
- United States Virgin Islands: 1,000
- Cuba: 870
- Aruba: 800
- Curacao: 700
- Bahamas: 300
- Dominican Republic: 54
- Haiti: 36

Languages
- Colonial Languages: English (American English; Canadian English; British English); Standard Dutch; Standard French; Standard Spanish; English Creoles and other languages: Trinidadian Creole; Guyanese Creole; Sranan Tongo; Jamaican Patois; Surinamese Dutch; Antillean French Creole; Papiamento; Caribbean Spanish; Indo-Caribbean Languages: Caribbean Hindustani; Hinglish–Urdish; Languages spoken by more recent immigrants: Standard Hindustani (Hindi–Urdu); South Asian English; Gujarati; Bengali; Kutchi; Marathi; Tamil; Telugu; Malayalam; Kannada; Other South Asian languages

Religion
- Majority: Hinduism (65-70%); Significant Minority: Christianity (15-20%) • Islam (10%); Other Minority: Sikhism; Jainism; Buddhism; Zoroastrianism; Baháʼí; Others

Related ethnic groups
- Indian people; Indo-Caribbean Americans; British Indo-Caribbean people; Indian Americans; Indo-Canadians; Indians in the Netherlands; British Indians; Indian South Africans; Indo-Fijians; Indo-Mauritians; Indian diaspora in Southeast Africa; Indian Singaporeans; Malaysian Indians; Asian Caribbean people

Indo-Caribbean or East Indian-Caribbean people are people from the Caribbean who trace their ancestry to the Indian subcontinent. They are descendants of the Jahazi indentured laborers from British India, who were brought by the British, Dutch, and French during the colonial era from the mid-19th century to the early 20th century.

Indo-Caribbean people largely trace their ancestry back to the Bhojpur and Awadh regions of the Hindi Belt in North India and the Bengal region in the eastern part of Colonial India, in the present-day states of Uttar Pradesh, Bihar, Bengal and Jharkhand, with a significant minority coming from the Madras Presidency in South India, especially present-day Tamil Nadu and Andhra Pradesh. Other notable regions of origin include Western Uttar Pradesh, Mithila, Magadh, Chota Nagpur, Madhya Pradesh, Haryana, Rajasthan, Pashtunistan, Punjab, Sindh, Kutch, Gujarat, Maharashtra, and Kashmir. Most Indians in the French West Indies are of South Indian origin and Indians in Barbados are mostly of Bengali and Gujarati origin.

Most Indo-Caribbean people live in the English-speaking Caribbean nations of Trinidad and Tobago, Guyana, the Dutch-speaking Suriname and the French overseas departments of Guadeloupe, Martinique and French Guiana. With smaller numbers in other Caribbean countries including Jamaica, Belize and the islands of the Lesser Antilles. Large Indo-Caribbean immigrant populations are found in North America and Europe, specifically in the United States, the Netherlands, Canada, and the United Kingdom. These countries have some of the largest Indo-Caribbean populations in the world, and Indo-Caribbeans in these countries have largely congregated in urban areas such as New York City, The Hague, Toronto, Rotterdam, London, Amsterdam, Miami/Ft. Lauderdale/West Palm Beach, Orlando/Ocala, Tampa, Houston, Birmingham, Winnipeg, Vancouver, Montreal, Schenectady/Albany, Minneapolis/Saint Paul, Manchester, Washington D.C., Leicester, and Paris.

Indo-Caribbean people may also be referred to as Caribbean Indians, East Indian West Indians, (Note: Many Indo-Caribbean people refer to themselves as East Indian West Indians, Indo-West Indians, or East and West Indians, especially in the diaspora, and many name their businesses that cater to the community as such.) Caribbean Hindustanis, South Asian Caribbean people, or Caribbean Desis, while first-generation Indo-Caribbean people were called Girmitya, Desi, Hindustani, Kantraki, Mulki (m.) / Mulkin (f.), or Jahazi (m.) / Jahazin (f.). (Note: In Indic (Indo-Aryan) languages such as Hindustani, the word Jahāz (जहाज़), which is sometimes pronounced as Jahāj in certain languages such as Maithili, means 'ship' (from the Arabic/Persian Jahāz/ جهاز), with Jahazi (or Jahaji) implying 'people of ship' or 'people coming via ship'.) Coolie, meaning hired laborer, was used in the plantation society of the late 19th to early 20th century, however in the present-day it is considered a derogatory way to refer to Indo-Caribbean people and is considered a pejorative.

== Sub-groups ==
Bold indicates major Indo-Caribbean subgroups.
Caribbean Islands

- Indo Anguillians
- Indo Sint Maarteners
- Indo Saint Martiner
- Indian Antiguans and Barbudans
- Indian Antiguans and Barbudans
- Indo-Bajans
- Indians in the Cayman Islands
- Indians in Cuba
- Indians in the Dominican Republic
- Indo-Grenadians
- **Indo-Guadeloupeans**
- Indo-Haitians
- **Indo-Jamaicans**
- **Indo-Martiniquais**
- Indians in Saint Kitts and Nevis
- Indo-Saint Lucian
- **Indo–Trinidadians and Tobagonians**
- Indians in the United States Virgin Islands
- Indo-Vincentian

Mainland Caribbean

- Indo-Belizeans
- **Indo-Guyanese**
- **Indo-Surinamese**
- Indians in French Guiana

Primary Indo-Caribbean Diaspora

- **Indo-Caribbean Americans**
- **Indo-Caribbean Canadians**
- **British Indo-Caribbean people**
- **Indo-Caribbean people in the Netherlands**

Secondary/Migrant Workers Indo-Caribbean Diaspora

- Indians in Venezuela
- Indians in Panama
- Indian immigration to Brazil
- Indians in Argentina
- Indian Colombians

Mixed Ethnicities of Partial Indo-Caribbean origin

- Anglo-Indian (mixed Indian and British)
- Asian Latin Americans (a.k.a. Tegli; mixed Indian and Hispanic/Latino)
  - Asian Hispanic and Latino Americans (mixed Indian and Hispanic/Latino in the U.S.)
- **Chindian** (mixed Indian and Chinese)
- **Dougla** (mixed Indian and African)
- Eurasian (mixed Indian and European)
- Luso-Indian (mixed Indian and Portuguese)
- Indo-Amerindian (mixed Indian and Amerindian)

== Migration history ==
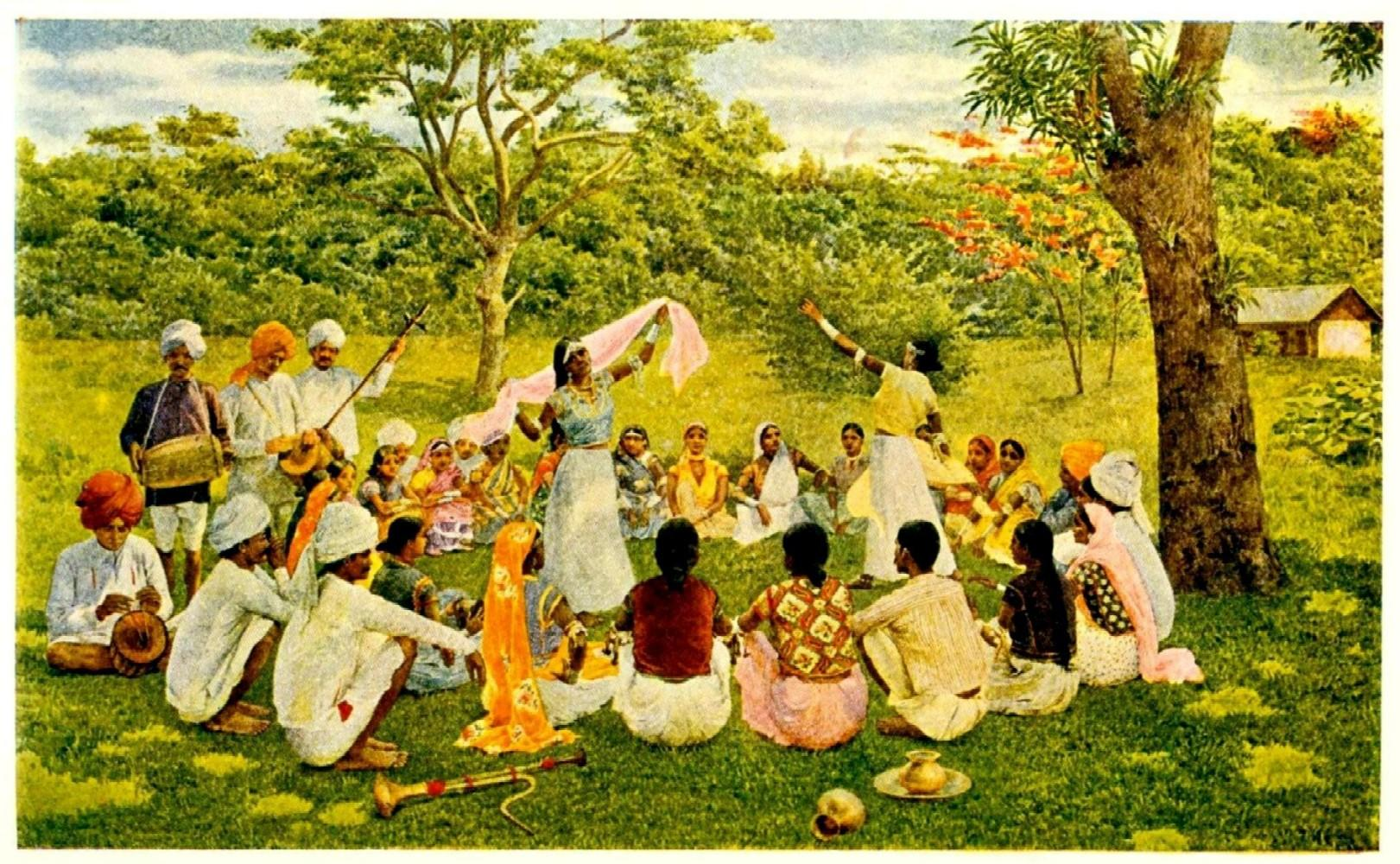
Indo-Caribbean people in the 19th century celebrating the Indian culture in West Indies through dance and music.

From 1838 to 1917, over half a million Indians from the former British Raj or British India and Colonial India, were taken to thirteen mainland and island nations in the Caribbean as indentured workers to address the demand for sugar cane plantation labour following the abolition of slavery.

=== Sugarcane plantations in the 19th century ===
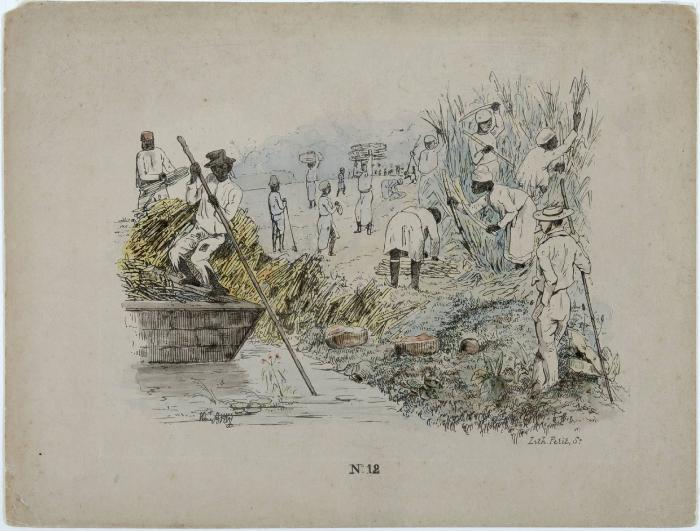
A 19th-century lithograph by Theodore Bray showing workers harvesting sugarcane on a Caribbean plantation; on the right is the European overseer.

Much like cotton, sugarcane plantations motivated large-scale near-enslavement and forced migrations in the 19th and early 20th century.

Following the passage of the 1833 Slavery Abolition Act, many formerly enslaved people left their enslavers. This created an economic chaos for European planters in the Caribbean and Indian Ocean. The hard work in hot, humid farms required a regular, docile and low-waged labour force, and India’s excess labor created a strong foundation to fix this problem, which led to the creation of the Indian indenture system. Poor economic conditions in India led to many Indians to look for sources of work. In this system, Indians were taken to British, French and Dutch colonies around the world, including in the Caribbean, to work on cash crop plantations.

Many indentured Indians opposed migration to the Caribbean. It was believed that crossing the sea would remove one's caste, something that was greatly valued by poor indentures. Rumor spread through Indian villages that laborers were forced to convert to Christianity when they reached Caribbean soil.

For some Indians, however, emigration to the Caribbean meant escaping problems they faced in India such as family conflict, economic hardship, poor living conditions, or trouble with the law.

Whether indentured Indians wanted to work on Caribbean plantations or not, recruiters would use pressure, force, and manipulation to get Indians to emigrate. Pressure stemmed from the fact that some Indians believed that they owed their recruiters for providing them their basic needs. Some were told romanticized stories about living and working conditions in the Caribbean, or were told lies about the destination of their travels, leading them to believe they were going to lands deemed holy.

The first ships carrying indentured labourers for sugarcane plantations left India in 1838 for the Caribbean region. In fact, the first two shiploads of Indians arrived in British Guiana (modern-day Guyana) on May 5, 1838, on board the Whitby and Hesperus. These ships had sailed from Calcutta. In the early decades of the sugarcane-driven migrations, the working conditions for the indentured Indian workers were abysmal, due in large part to the lack of care among the planters.. They were confined to their estates and paid a pitiful salary. Any breach of contract brought automatic criminal penalties and imprisonment. Many of these were brought away from their homelands deceptively. Many from inland regions over a thousand kilometers from seaports were promised jobs, were not told the work they were being hired for, or that they would leave their homeland and communities. They were hustled aboard the waiting ships, unprepared for the long and arduous four-month sea journey. Charles Anderson, a special magistrate investigating these sugarcane plantations, wrote to the Colonial Secretary declaring that with few exceptions, the indentured labourers are treated with great and unjust severity; European planters enforced work in sugarcane farms so harshly, that the decaying remains of immigrants were frequently discovered in sugarcane fields. If indentured labourers protested and refused to work, they were not paid or fed by the planters.

The sugarcane plantation-driven migrations led to ethnically significant presence of Indians in Caribbean. In some islands and countries, these Indo-Caribbean migrants now constitute a significant proportion of the population. Sugarcane plantations and citizens of Indian origin continue to thrive in countries such as Guyana, formerly, British Guiana, Jamaica, Trinidad and Tobago, Martinique, French Guiana, Guadeloupe, Grenada, St. Lucia, St. Vincent, St. Kitts, St. Croix, Suriname and Nevis. By some estimates, over 2.5 million people in the Caribbean are of Indian origin. Many have ethnically blended with migrants from other parts of the world, creating a unique syncretic culture.

Though production was centered in the Caribbean, sugarcane production played a significant role in pre-World War II global politics and population movements. France, for example, negotiated with Britain leading to Act XLVI of 1860, whereby large numbers of Indian indentured labourers were brought for sugarcane plantation work in French colonies in the Caribbean region. The Caribbean colonies of the Netherlands too benefitted from the indentured laborers from India.

=== Arrival of Indian women in the Caribbean ===
The ratio of female to male Indians coming to the Caribbean was for many years extremely low, 3:100 in 1938. The Indian government and the Colonial Office set up a quota system that dictated how many Indian women came to the Caribbean. In 1870, the quota called for 40 Indian women for every 100 Indian men, a quota that often was not met. In total, only 25% of all Indians who emigrated to the Caribbean were women. There were several reasons for fewer Indian women than men emigrating.

It was more expensive for agents to recruit Indian women than men, because not many Indian women wanted to leave India. It was more socially acceptable in India for men to emigrate and seek work. Women were not encouraged to do the same. Another factor dissuading Indian women from going to the Caribbean was the invasive medical examination administered upon arrival, which involved inspection of genitals. Many women did not want to have to undergo this examination and many men would not have wanted this to happen to their wives.

Additionally, the colonial powers present in the Caribbean were not initially interested in convincing Indian women to immigrate. Colonialists saw indentureship as a temporary replacement for the labor that had previously been done by enslaved African people. Their goal was to use Indian men for labor. They did not want Indian people to start families in the Caribbean, which would establish Indian culture and people as a lasting presence in the Caribbean, undermining the power of the indenture system to control all aspects of the laborer's lives and force them into subjugation.

In the late 1800s, there was a change in policy. The late 1880s saw competition in the sugar industry from European beet sugar, and the colonial government knew that having a settled, immobile group of Indian people to exploit for labor would be highly profitable and advantageous in the competition to dominate the sugar industry. Encouraging Indian people to stay in the Caribbean also cut the costs required to bring Indian people back to India. As indentureships ended, the Indian men who had come to work as indentured laborers were given small parcels of land to encourage settlement. Another method of encouraging settlement was to encourage more Indian women to immigrate, since permanent settlement was no longer being discouraged by the colonial powers.

Indian women who were recruited and immigrated to the Caribbean were for the most part married women joining their husbands, single women, women who had been widowed, women trying to escape poverty, and women prostitutes from the cities of Calcutta and Chennai, then called Madras. Under the indenture system, married Indian women were excused from work on the plantations and planters were required to give them medical care and rations. However, the colonial government did not recognize Hindu or Muslim marriages until the 1940s, so many married women were categorized as single and did not receive the few privileges given to married women. Married women who did not have to work in the fields took care of children and expenses. Women who worked were paid less than men.

=== Post World War II trends ===
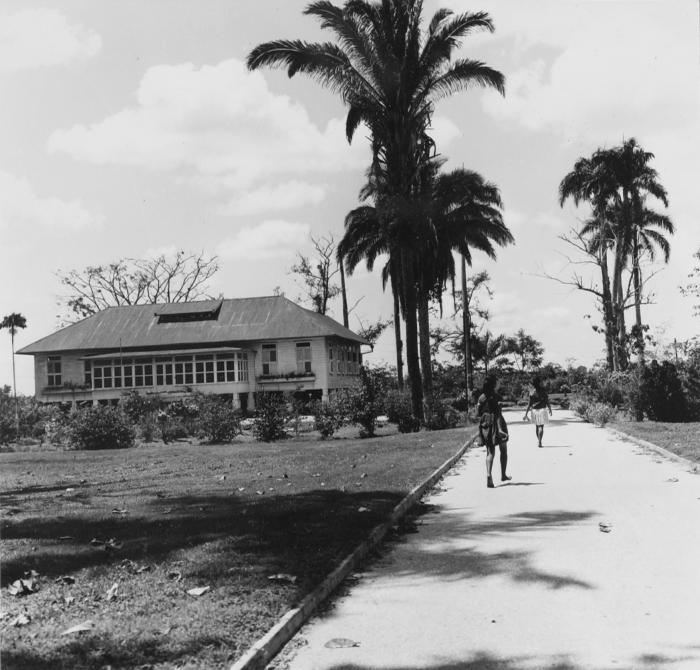
Indian indentured laborers worked for decades for meagre wages in sugar cane plantations of the Dutch East Indies. This image from Tropenmuseum Royal Tropical Institute shows two Indo-Caribbean people walking towards the house of a Dutch engineer in a Caribbean sugar cane plantation.

The majority of the Indians living in the English-speaking Caribbean came from eastern Uttar Pradesh and western Bihar which are mostly speakers of Bhojpuri, Hindi, and Awadhi, while those brought to Guadeloupe and Martinique were largely from Andhra Pradesh and Tamil Nadu. About twenty percent (20%) of the indentured were Tamils and Telugus particularly in Trinidad and Tobago and Guyana.

A minority emigrated from other parts of South Asia, including present-day Pakistan and Bangladesh.

Indo-Caribbean people comprise the largest ethnic group in Guyana, Trinidad and Tobago, and Suriname. They are the second largest group in Jamaica, Grenada, Saint Vincent and the Grenadines, Saint Lucia, Martinique and Guadeloupe.

There are also small communities in Anguilla, Antigua and Barbuda, The Bahamas, Barbados, Belize, French Guiana, Panama, Dominican Republic, Puerto Rico, the Netherlands Antilles and Venezuela. Small groups also exist in Haiti, where they are sometimes mistakenly referred to as "mulattos".

=== Contemporary migration ===
Modern-day immigrants from India (mostly Sindhi merchants) are to be found on Saint-Martin / Sint Maarten, St. Thomas, Curaçao and other islands with duty-free commercial capabilities, where they are active in business. Other Indo-Caribbean people descend from later migrants, including Indian doctors, Gujarati businessmen and migrants from Kenya and Uganda.

=== Diaspora ===
Indo-Caribbean people have migrated to the United States, Canada, the United Kingdom, the Netherlands, France, Ireland, and to other parts of the Caribbean and Latin America.

== Culture ==
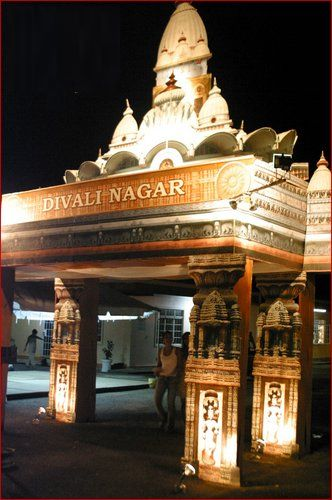
Many Caribbean islands celebrate traditional Indian festivals, such as Diwali, as shown in this Divali Nagar decorations from Trinidad and Tobago.

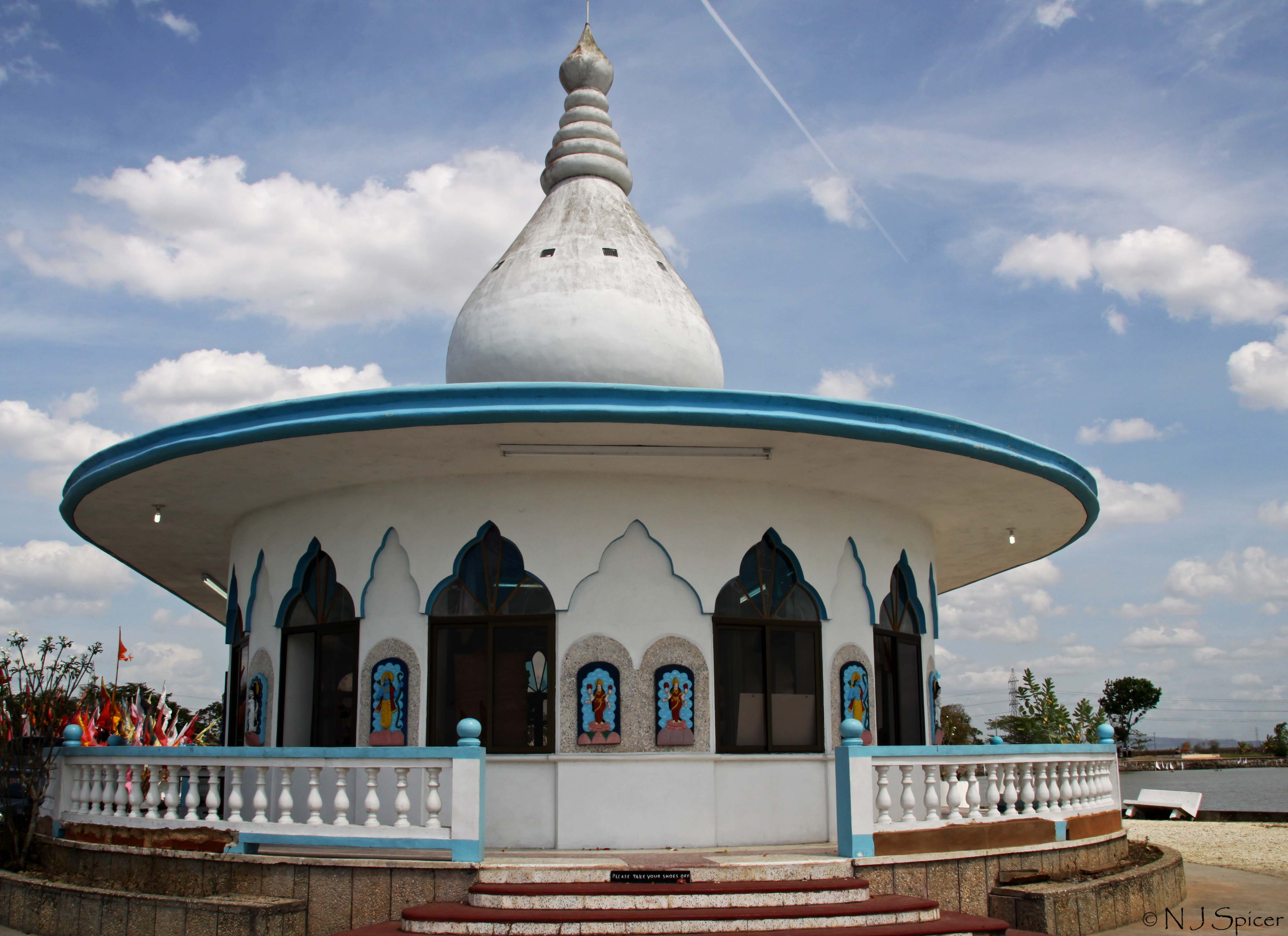
Temple in the Sea

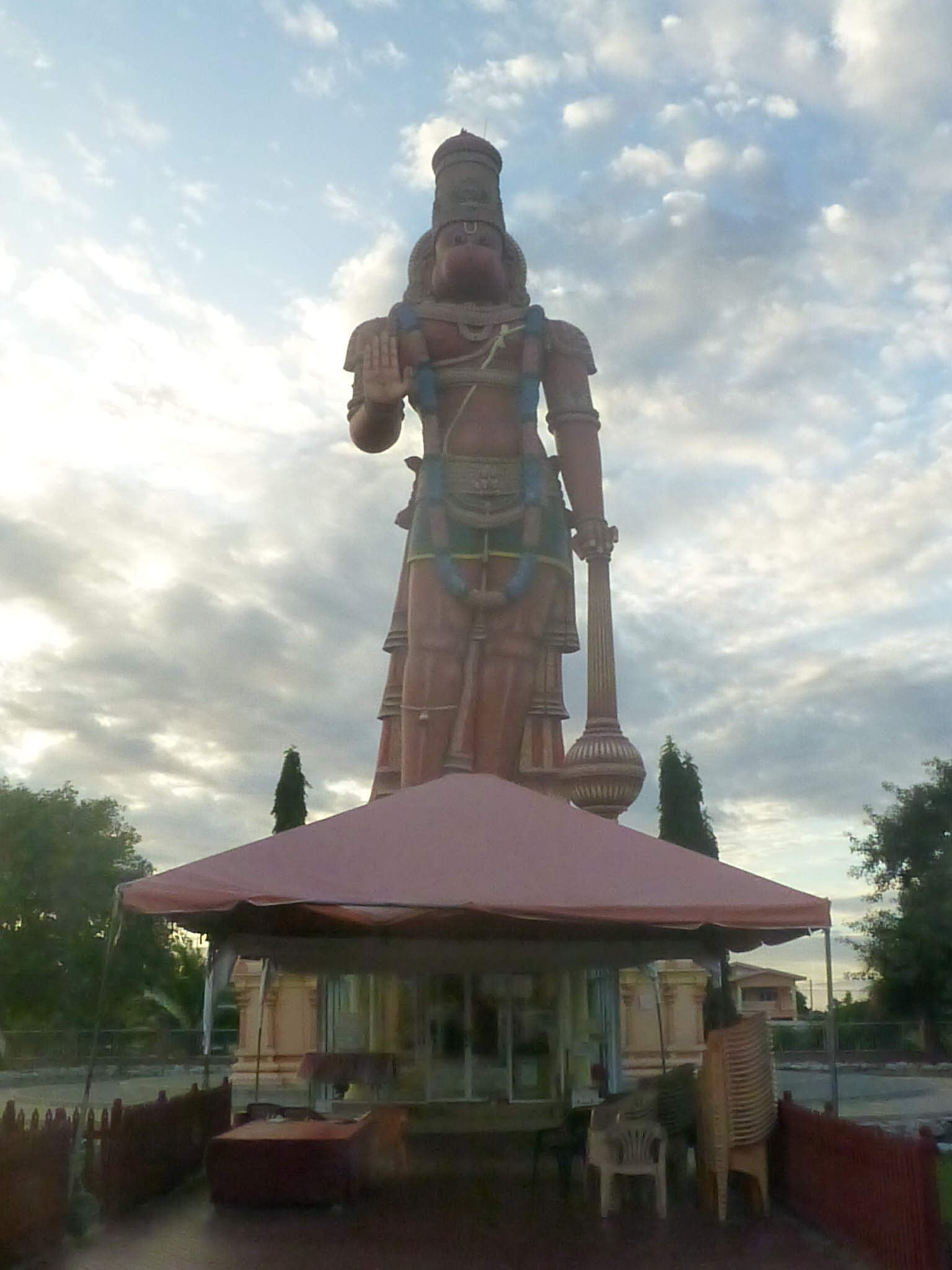
The 26-meter Hanuman murti in Carapichaima, a noted centre of Hindu and Indo-Trinidadian culture; it is the largest statue of Hanuman outside of India

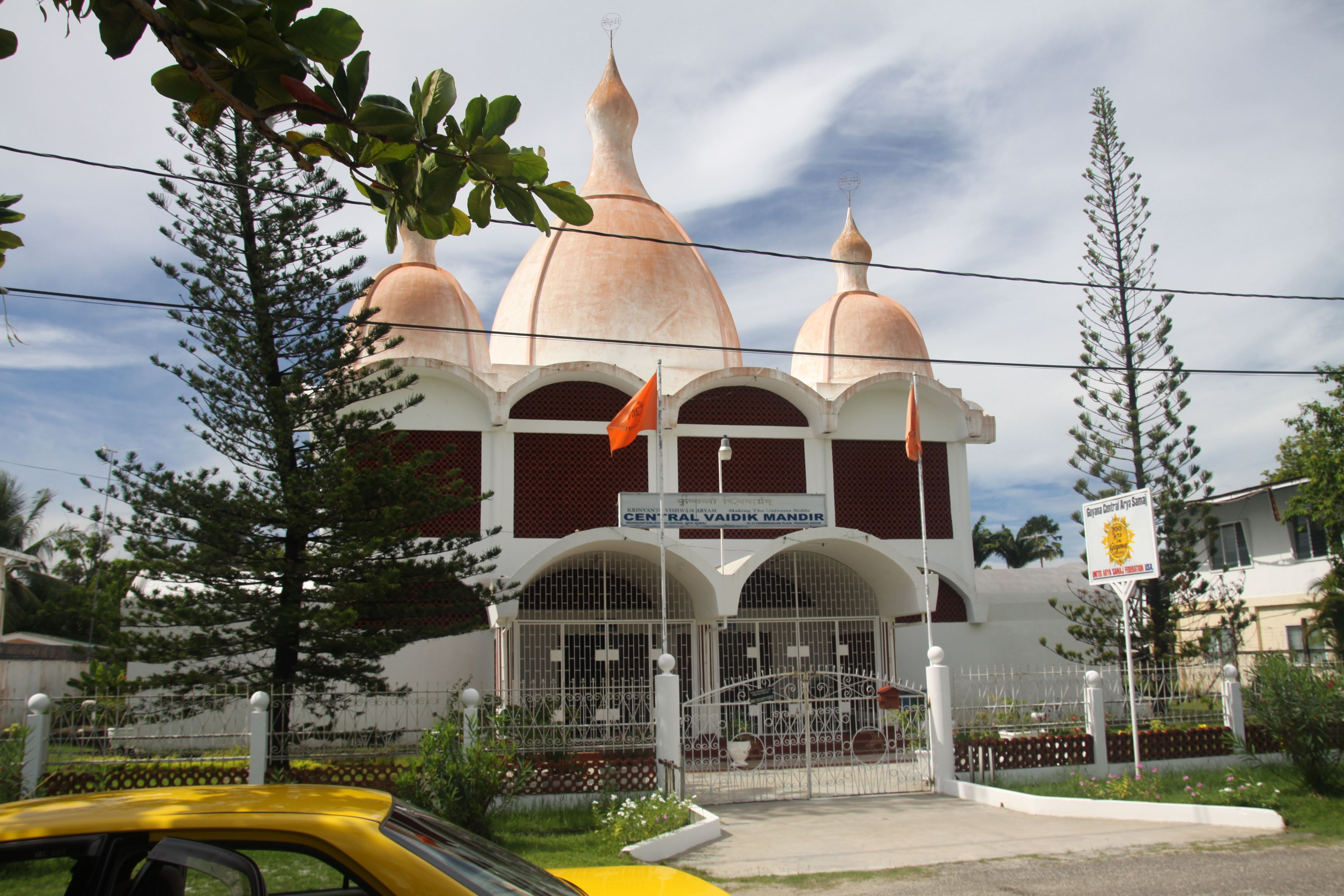
Central Vaidic Mandir in Georgetown, Guyana

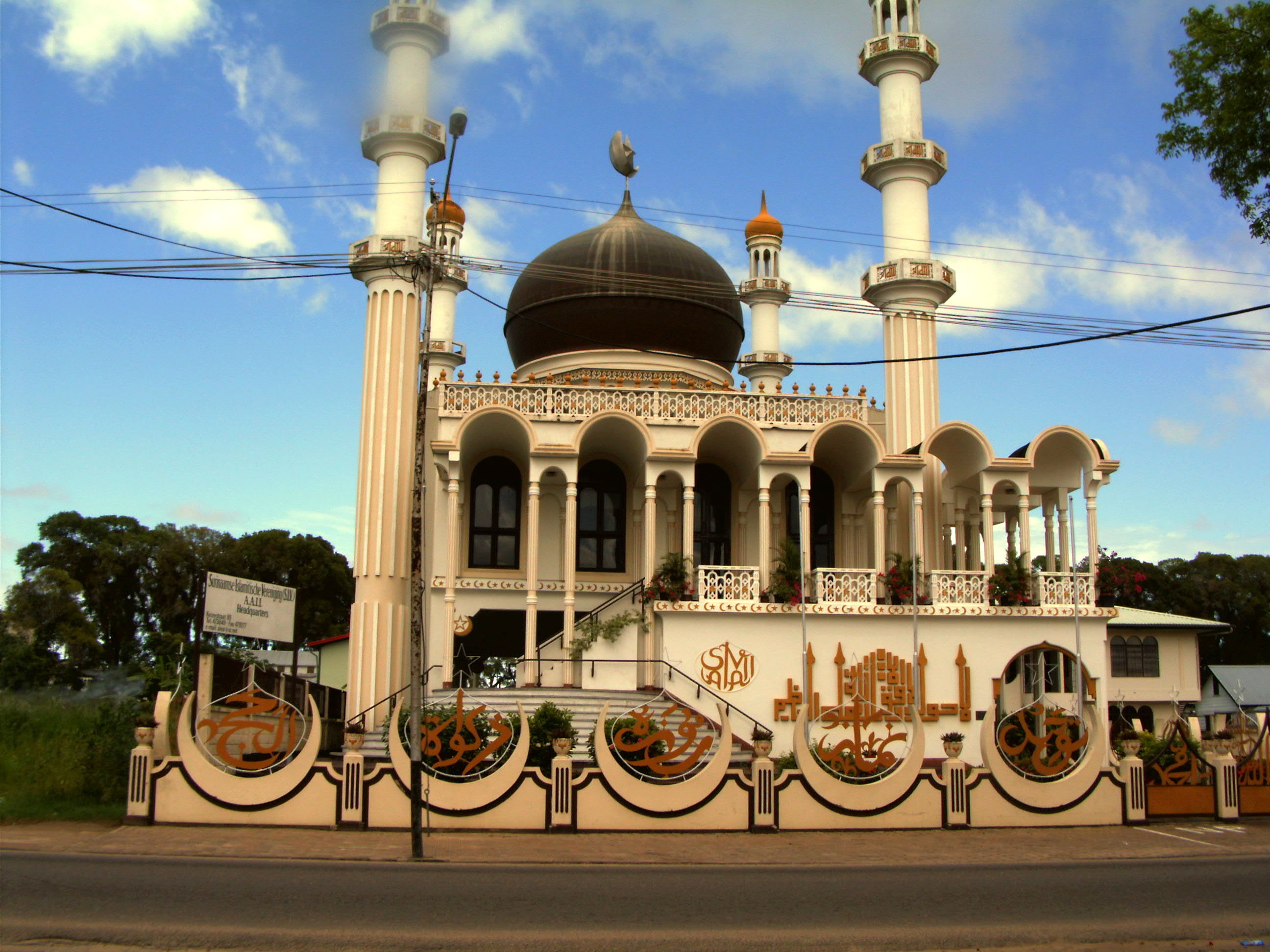
Mosque Keizerstraat

The indentured Indians and their descendants have actively contributed to the evolution of their adopted lands in spite of many difficulties, particularly through the development of Caribbean cuisine and music.

The initial generations of indentured Indians brought several traditional Indian games to the region, though most of these are no longer played.

== Commemoration ==
In recent years, attempts to commemorate the Indian presence and contributions to the Caribbean have come to fruition:

Indian Arrival Day is a holiday celebrated on May 30 in Trinidad and Tobago each year since the 1990s. It was first celebrated in Trinidad and Tobago and then other countries with significant Indian people whose ancestors came as indentured laborers. It commemorates the first arrivals from India to Trinidad and Tobago, on May 30, 1845, on the ship Fatel Razack

In 1995, Jamaica started to celebrate the arrival of Indians in Old Harbour Bay, St. Catherine Parish on May 13.

In 2003, Martinique celebrated the 150th anniversary of Indian arrival. Guadeloupe did the same in 2004. These celebrations were not the fact of just the Indian minority, but the official recognition by the French and local authorities of their integration and their wide-scale contributions in various fields including agriculture, education, and politics, and to the diversification of the culture of the Creole peoples. Thus, the noted participation of the whole multi-ethnic population of the two islands were in these events.

St. Lucia and many Caribbean countries have dedicated commemorative days to acknowledge the arrival and important contributions of their Indo-Caribbean populations. St. Lucia celebrates its Indo-Caribbean heritage on May 6. Other dates when India Arrival Day is celebrated in the Caribbean include May 5 (Guyana), May 10 (Jamaica), May 30 (Trinidad and Tobago), June 1 (St. Vincent), and June 5 (Suriname).

== See also ==
- Anglophone Caribbean
- Awadhi people
- Bhojpuri people
- Bombay (mango)
- Caribbean Hindustani
- Caribbean Shaktism
- Dhantal
- Hinduism in the West Indies
- Indian Caribbean Museum of Trinidad and Tobago
- Indian diaspora
- Indian people
- Indians in the Netherlands
- Indo-Caribbean music
- Lalla Rookh Museum
- South Asian diaspora
- Tamil diaspora
- Tassa
