= Raymond Ramnarine =

Trinidadian and Tobagonian singer

- Born: Raymond Ramnarine; San Fernando, Trinidad and Tobago
- Relatives: Rennie Ramnarine (brother); Richard Ramnarine (brother)

Raymond Ramnarine is a Trinbagonian singer and songwriter who is the lead vocalist and arranger of the crossover chutney soca band Dil-E-Nadan.

== Early life ==
Ramnarine was born in San Fernando and grew up in nearby Gasparillo.

== Music career ==
On January 26, 2013, Ramnarine participated in a singing performance competition in San Fernando, Trinidad. Ramnarine won first prize the competition scoring 43.7 points, a 1.1-point lead ahead of Rikki Jai, the second-place contestant. Ramnarine won $1,000,000 and stated he intended to use it for charity to help the underprivileged.

On March 22, 2014, Ramnarine and fellow local performers Vineet Singh, Avinash Maharaj, and others, held a concert, Everybody Loves Raymond, named after a popular sitcom by the same name at the Centre of Excellence, Macoya.

On February 1, 2021, he and the band released the official music video for their song, "Good Vibez."

On June 19, 2021, he and the band released the official music video for their song, "Tujhe Suraj." By November 2021, the video had 3.84 million views on YouTube. As of May 2023, the video has over 12 million views on YouTube.

In August 2022, Ramnarine has stated that one of his long-term goals of his music career is to spread the "positive side" of Trinidad and Tobago and reduce the worldwide stigma against the region.
