= Harischandra Khemraj =

Guyanese writer

Harischandra Khemraj (born 1944) is a writer from Guyana. Cosmic Dance, published in 1991 by Peepal Tree Press, won the 1994 Guyana Prize for Literature.

Haris Khemraj has three adult daughters whom all attended universities in the United States. He currently lives in the US with wife and family.
