= The Supertones Band =

West Indian band

The Supertones Band is a West Indian band specializing in Chutney music, which is a very popular Caribbean music style with Indian influences.

== History ==
Being the most toured international Chutney-Soca band based in the U.S., Supertones has toured the U.S., Canada, Guyana, Suriname, The Netherlands, Spain, and England. They are the first Chutney-Soca band to launch an app in the iPhone and Android markets. They are also the first West Indian band to play off-Broadway. The Supertones Band has performed at Caribbean Carnivals, such as Miami Carnival, Tampa Carnival, Minnesota’s Twin Cities Carifest, Toronto’s Caribana, etc. They also opened or headlined other Chutney and Soca events being sponsored by the largest promotion group in the industry, Soiree, based in Orlando, Florida.

== Members ==
Avinash Singh is also the leader of the band on stage, playing the keyboards and programmed arrangements.
“Princess Anisa” Singh, is the lead female vocalist.
“King Raj” Singh is the lead male vocalist.

== Music ==
Although they specialize in Chutney music, The Supertones Band also records and performs a wide range of other genres, including soca, reggae, dancehall, Bollywood, and reggaeton. Their hit song, “Tek Sunita” by Princess Anisa was ranked among the top Chutney songs on music charts in Guyana, Canada, Trinidad, US, Suriname and the Netherlands.

== Discography ==
The Supertones Band's music can be heard on many albums, but they have also produced their own albums:
- BombaTrax (2000)
- Avi and The Supertones Band (2003)
- Blazing Chutney Dance Mix (2005)
- Blazing Chutney Dance Mix, Volume 2 (2006)
- Red Hot Supertones Band (2009)
- Carnival On The Road (2011)

== Awards ==
The Supertones Band has received many Certifications of Excellence or Appreciation from many cities in the US, such as a Proclamation from Jersey City, NJ, but their Awards include:
2009 West Indian Music Award for:
- “Best Performing Stage Band”
- “Best Recorded Band”
- “Best Crossover Band”
2011 West Indian Music Award for:
- “Video of the Year” (for Princess Anisa's hit song, Tek Sunita.)
2013 West Indian Music Award for:
- “Outstanding Contribution to Music”
- “Female Singer of the Year” (Princess Anisa)
- “Best Music Director” (Avinash Singh)
