= Rikki Jai =

- Born: Samraj Jaimungal; October 17, 1964 (age 61); Friendship Village, Penal-Debe, Trinidad and Tobago
- Other name: The Jaimaster
- Spouse: Shelly-Ann Jaimungal
- Musical career
- Origin: Southern Trinidad
- Genres: Chutney, Chutney Soca, Soca
- Occupation: Musician
- Instrument: Vocals
- Years active: 1988–present

Rikki Jai (born Samraj Jaimungal; pronounced [səmərɑːɟə ɟəjəməⁿɡələ]) is an Indo-Trinidadian chutney and chutney-soca musician.

== Career ==
Jai's 1988 debut single Sumintra told the tale of an Indo-Trinidadian woman from Debe who informed her boyfriend of her preference for soca over the music of Indian artist Lata Mangeshkar. Jai returned the following year with Pumping, then Bolo and Show Me Yuh Motion. His 1993 song Wine on a Bumsee signalled Jai's exit from the soca world, opting for the chutney soca arena, in which he continues to perform.

Jai later released Chutney Vibrations, a compilation of his soca chutney songs. His biggest chutney soca hit is Mor Tor featuring soca star Machel Montano. While Barman and ''Scorpion Sting Me'' & ''Leh We Fete'' are also chutney soca hits of his. In 2011, he won his 6th Chutney Soca Monarch title, with the song White Oak and Water, walking away with TT$2 million in prize money. Jai was later crowned for the 7th said time after teaming up with Ravi B.

In 2001, he tied for first place (with Bunji Garlin) for the "Young King" title. Jai is also a record breaking nine time Chutney Soca Monarch winner.

== Accolades ==
In 2012 he was bestowed with a Hummingbird Medal Gold, a national award of Trinidad and Tobago. On Tuesday 7, October 2023, Jai acquired an honorary doctorate in fine arts from the University of Trinidad and Tobago.

== Personal life ==
Jai is the owner of Sheriff Street Restaurant and Lounge in Queens, New York. Married to wife Shelly, he's also the father of Aashish and Vaashish, their two sons.
