= Heeralal Rampartap =

Heeralal Rampartap is an Indo-Trinidadian entertainer. He has repeatedly produced hits and has won numerous awards both locally and internationally. He is a three-time International Chutney Soca Monarch — in 1997, 2003 and 2005 – and the National Chutney Monarch of 2002 and 2003. He has also taken first place in the Indian Cultural Pageant for three consecutive years and won the first Tuco Chutney Monarch in 2005 followed by two further wins in 2006, 2007 and 2008. He received the National Humming Bird Silver Medal for Culture in Trinidad and Tobago in 2005.

Rampartap has produced hits such as "Chutney Posse", "Basmatee", "Balama wa ray", "Chutney Kirkatay", "Run for meh life", "Dai meh family", "I'm a Trini" and several others. He has done several social commentaries which have been well received. In his 2005 hit "Treat Yuh Woman Nice", he gives advice to men on balancing gender roles and treating women with respect. Rampartap also performs religious songs and recently produced a bhajan album with his band, Shakti - D Mash Up Crew.

D Hero, as Rampartap is sometimes known, has a wife, son, and daughter. His daughter Shakti has written most of his winning compositions, the others being written by his wife. Shakti is becoming widely popular as she follows in the footsteps of her father. His son enjoys doing rhythms. In 2007 Rampartap was a part of a team accompanying Trinidad and Tobago's Minister of Trade on a Trade Mission tour. He was overwhelmed with the response he received in India, China and Korea.
