= Deborah Persaud =

South American-born American virologist

- Born: 23 August 1960 (age 66); Port Mourant, East Berbice-Corentyne, British Guiana (present-day Guyana)
- Known for: HIVs, AIDSs
- Scientific career
- Fields: HIV in children
- Workplaces: Hopkins Children's Center; Johns Hopkins University School of Medicine

Deborah Persaud (born 23 August 1960) is a Guyanese-born American virologist who primarily works on HIV/AIDS at Johns Hopkins Children's Center.

== Biography ==
Persaud was born on 23 August 1960 in Port Mourant, East Berbice-Corentyne, Guyana to an Indo-Guyanese family. At age 16 she moved to Brooklyn. Persaud attended the New York University School of Medicine after receiving her undergraduate degree from York College CUNY. She also earned a master's degree at the New York University School of Medicine. She started residency at the Babies Hospital of New York and finished her chief residency at the same hospital. Persaud later was a fellow at the New York University School of Medicine. She began her academic career as an assistant professor of pediatrics at the Johns Hopkins University School of Medicine from 1997 to 2004. In 2005, Persaud became an associate professor of pediatrics at the Johns Hopkins University School of Medicine.

== Research ==
The main topic of Persaud's research is AIDS and HIV of children. However, her research started from research about HIV in adults. In 2003, she stated about the human immunodeficiency virus (HIV)- type1 included in the subtypes of HIV. For the HIV patient, the HAART (highly active antiretroviral therapy) is used as treatment. The HAART regimen includes some drugs containing nucleoside reverse transcriptase inhibitors (NRTIs) and protease inhibitor (PI), and non-nucleoside reverse transcriptase inhibitors (NNRTI). The HAART has important function to suppress the levels of HIV-1 to below quantification. HIV-1 persists in cellular reservoirs of CD4+ continually with low-level viremia in adults, and this is very sensitive. Persaud and her research team found that viremia persists in children with plasma virus remaining at a level under the limit of detection of clinical assays. When children with HIV-1 receive HAART treatment, the viremia that is difficult to observe is continued virus production without resistance in the protease gene. Persaud's research team tried to find a novel culture assay that can stimulate the virus production during their latent, integrated HIV-1 in resting CD4+ T cells with the antiretroviral drugs. These drugs interfere with the replication of unintegrated virus. They also demonstrated the facts that HIV-1 polymerase sequences from the resting CD4+ T cells of the patients. By following this research, her research topic has been about antiretroviral therapy. In 2009, her research team focused on the ongoing human immunodeficiency virus type 1 (HIV-1). From this research, it was found out ongoing virus replication contributes to low-level viremia in patients on HAART, and this ongoing replication is subject to CD8+ T-cell selective pressure. After that, she suggested the induction therapy by using protease-inhibitors has influenced the effect of NNRTI (non-Nucleoside reverse transcriptase inhibitors) resistance on virologic response to nevirapine-based HAART in children patients of HIV. For a long time, her research topic has been focusing on the therapy of HIV-1 especially with the child patients. In order to develop the therapy, she has been explained about the mechanism using the NNRTI of HAART.

In 2013 Persaud worked as part of a team who showed that a baby had been cured of HIV by giving it anti-HIV drugs; she won the Elizabeth Glaser Scientist Award and was featured in Time magazine's list of the 100 most influential people in 2013. She was also included in Nature's 10 for 2013, by the journal Nature. In 2014 Persaud's work contributed to a second baby being cured of HIV.

== Professional activity ==
- Pediatric AIDS Clinical Trials Group, Virology Core Committee (2000), Vaccine Subcommittee (2001) and Immunology Subcommittee (2001)
- International Maternal Pediatric Adolescent AIDS Clinical Trials Group(IMPAACT) Laboratory Committee(2006)
- NIH study section, AIDS Drug Development and Therapeutics (2006)
- Foundation Grant review: Doris Duke Charitable Foundation, and AMFAR (2006-2007)
- NIH Bench-to-bedside (2006, 2008)
- International Maternal Pediatric Adolescent AIDS Clinical Trials Group(IMPAACT) Subspeciality Laboratory
- Program Director, Pediatric Infectious Diseases Fellowship
- Member of Infectious Diseases Society of America, Pediatric Infectious Diseases Society and Society for Pediatric Research
