= Indo-Caribbean music =

Indo-Caribbean music is the musical traditions of the Indo-Caribbean people of the Caribbean music area. Indo-Caribbean music is most common in Trinidad and Tobago, Guyana, Jamaica, Martinique and Suriname.

Indo-Caribbean traditional music often reflects the Bhojpuri heritage of many Indo-Caribbean people; women's folk songs are especially reflective of the music of Bhojpur. These include folk songs for childbirth (sohar), humorous and light-hearted songs for a bride's family to insult the groom's (gali), funereal songs (nirgun) and matkor. Other women's folk songs are seasonal and are performed at festivals like the phagwah and holi. Instrumentation consists mostly of the dhantal, a metal rod and claper, and the dholak, a two-headed barrel drum. Traditional Hindu bhajans are also common.

Modern Indo-Caribbean traditions include the seasonal, responsorial men's form, the chowtal, and a vocal song form called taan-singing, performed by a single male vocalist accompanied by his own harmonium and further accompaniment by the dholak and dhantal. Tassa drumming is also common.

Indo-Caribbean contributions to popular music are very important. The most well-known is the Indo-Trinidadian chutney music tradition. Chutney is a form of popular dance music that developed in the mid-to late 20th century. Baithak Gana is a similar popular form originating in Suriname. Modern Indian film music, filmi, is also renowned among Indo-Caribbean people.

== See also ==
- Indo-Caribbean
- Music of India
- Culture of India
- Music of Trinidad and Tobago
- Music of Suriname
- Music of Guyana
