= Dholak =

South Asian drum

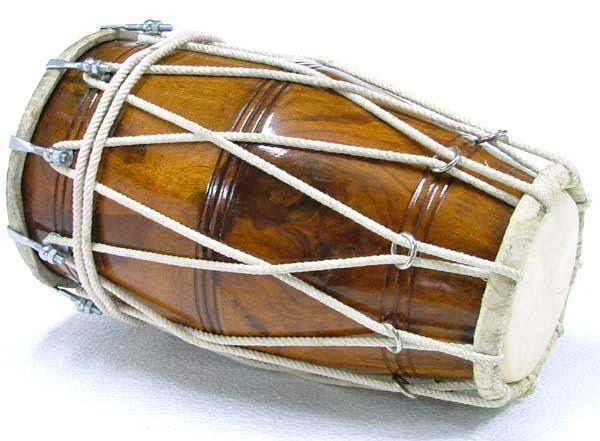
- Dholak drum

Percussion instrument
- Classification: percussion
- Hornbostel–Sachs classification: 211.22.2 Barrel drums (Instruments in which the body is barrel-shaped, which have two usable membranes)

Related instruments
- dhol; tabla

The dholak is a two-headed hand drum and folk percussion instrument of South Asian origin. The dholak can be anywhere about 16" to 24" in length. It is widely used in qawwali, kirtan, bhajan, bhangra, chutney, baithak gana, Hindi film music, lokgeet and various classical styles such as Hindustani, Carnatic and Trinidadian local classical / Guyanese taan. The drum has two different sized drumheads. There is a smaller drumhead that can be from 5.5 to 8 inches in diameter and is made for sharp notes while the bigger drumhead, which can be from 7.5 to 10 inches in diametre, is made for low pitch. The two drumheads allow a combination of bass and treble with rhythmic high and low pitches. The body or shell of the Dholak can made of sheesham or mango wood. The larger drum head has a compound of tar, clay and sand, called "masala" which is applied to lower the pitch and produce the sound. The smaller drumhead is played with the person's dominant hand, while the larger is played by the person's weaker hand. A dholak can either be fitted with a nuts and bolts or a rope and steel rings for tuning. Commonly in the Indian subcontinent, there are only one set of rings for tuning the treble side of the dholak, while in the Caribbean (Trinidad, Guyana and Suriname), hook screws are placed into the sides of the dholak to allow tuning of both the treble and the bass. Dholak can be played in three ways — on the player’s lap, while standing, or pressed down with one knee while sitting on the floor.

== Construction ==
The smaller surface of the dholak is made of goat skin for sharp notes and the bigger surface is made of buffalo skin for low pitches, which allows a combination of bass and treble with rhythmic high and low pitches.

The shell is sometimes made from sheesham wood (Dalbergia sissoo) but cheaper dholaks may be made from any wood, such as mango. In Sri Lanka, the Dholak has been borrowed from India and has only seen some popularity there in recent times .

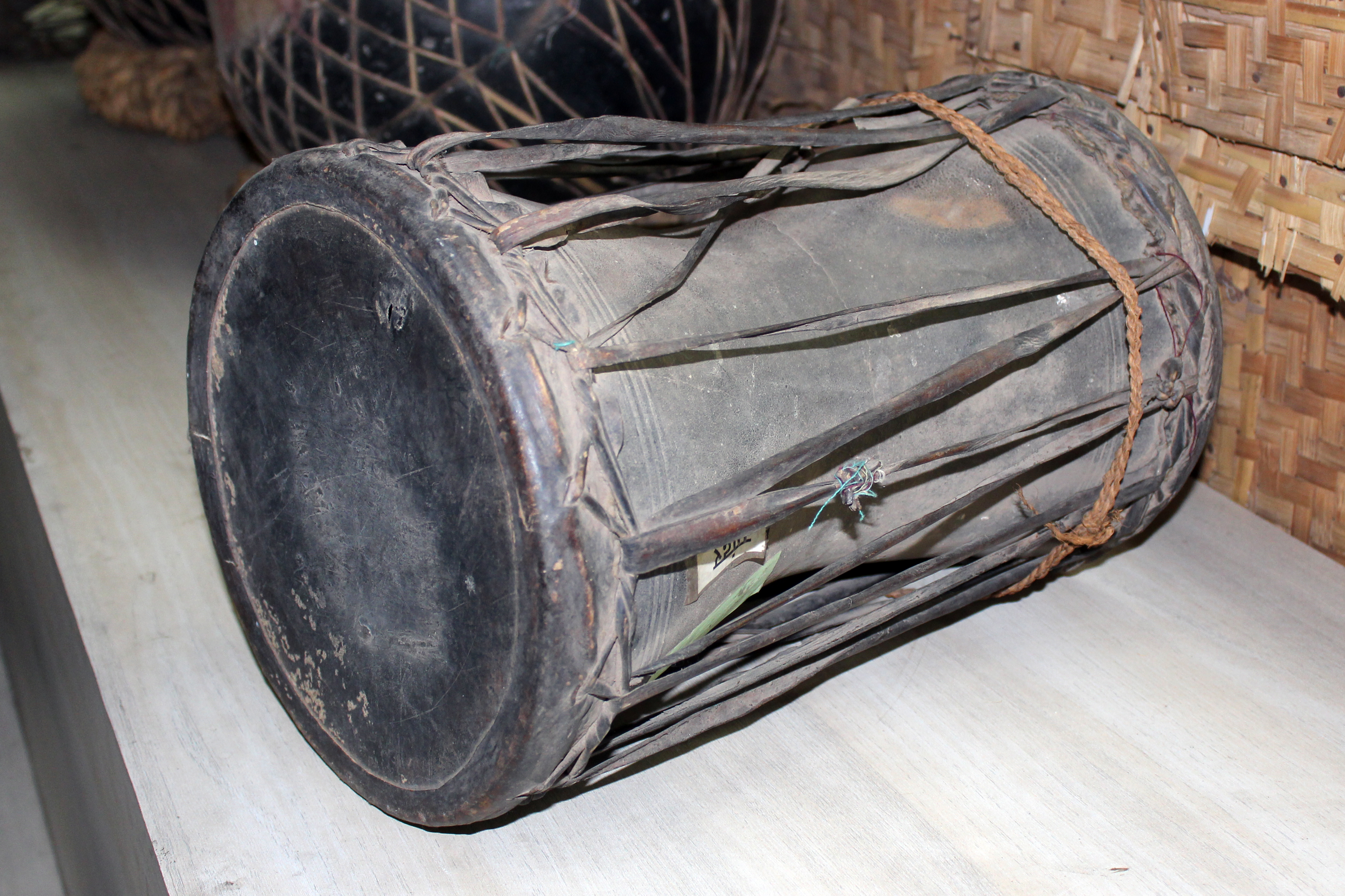
Dholak of Chhattisgarh tribes

== Usage ==
It is widely used in qawwali, kirtan, lavani and bhangra. It was formerly used in classical dance. Indian children sing and dance to it during pre-wedding festivities. It is often used in Filmi Sangeet (Indian film music), in chutney music, chutney-soca, baitak gana, taan singing, bhajans, and the local Indian folk music of Jamaica, Suriname, Guyana, Caribbean, South Africa, Mauritius, and Trinidad and Tobago, where it was brought by indentured immigrants. The Dholak is also used as a percussion instrument in qawwali ensembles. In the Fiji Islands the dholak is widely used for Indian folk music, bhajan and kirtan.

The dholak's higher-pitched head is a simple membrane while the bass head, played usually with the left hand, has a compound syahi to lower the pitch and enable the typical Dholak sliding sound ("giss" or "gissa"), often the caked residue of mustard oil pressing, to which some sand and oil or tar may be added.

== Playing style ==
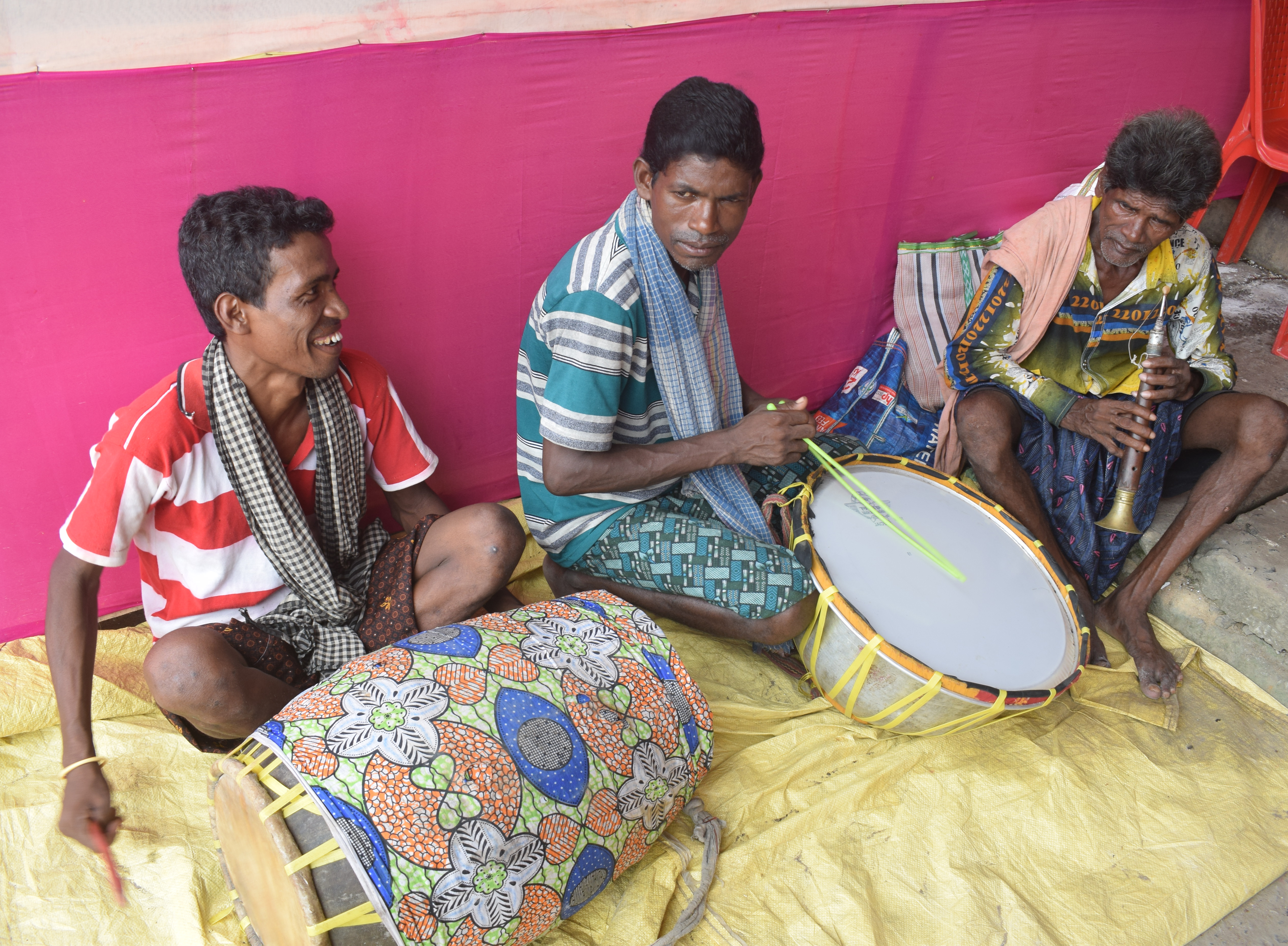
A group of Dholak players in Odisha, India

The drum is either played on the player's lap or, while standing, slung from the shoulder or waist or pressed down with one knee while sitting on the floor.

In some styles of playing (such as Punjab) an iron thumb ring is used to produce a distinctive "chak" rim sound. In other styles (such as Rajasthani), all fingers are generally used.

Dholak masters are often adept at singing or chanting and may provide primary entertainment or lead drumming for a dance troupe. Perhaps the most characteristic rhythm played on the dhol is a quick double-dotted figure that may be counted in rhythmic solfege as "one -tah and -tah two -tah and -tah three-e -tah, four and " (rest on "and") or simply a long string of double-dotted notes, over which the bass side is used for improvisation.

On large dholaks, known as dhols, the high-pitched head may be played using a thin (1/4" / 6 mm or less) long (over 14" / 30 cm) stick of rattan or bamboo (rattan is preferred for its flexibility) and the low-pitched drum head using a somewhat thicker, angled stick.

== Variants ==
The dholki (Hindi/Urdu: pipe or tube) is often a bit narrower in diameter and uses tabla-style syahi masala on its treble skin. This instrument is also known as the naal. Its treble skin is stitched onto an iron ring, similar to East Asian Janggu or Shime-daiko drums, which tenses the head before it is fitted. The bass skin often has the same structure as in ordinary dholak, being fitted on to a bamboo ring, but sometimes they have a kinar and pleated Gajra, as seen in tabla, to withstand the extra tension.

Similar drums with similar names are found elsewhere in Western Asia.

== See also ==
- Madal
- Drums
- Tabla
- Mridangam
