= Chutney music =

Music genre originating in Trinidad and Tobago

Chutney
- Native name: चटनी چٹنی
- Etymology: Chutney, a spicy condiment which early artistes thought the fast-paced rhythms were "hot" like the condiment
- Other names: Chatnee
- Stylistic origins: Indian classical music, folk music, including Bhojpuri folk traditions, and later fused with calypso, soca and filmi
- Cultural origins: Mid-20th century, Indo-Caribbeans with indentured servant or immigrant ancestry
- Typical instruments: dholak, tabla, harmonium, dhantal

Fusion genres
- Chutney soca; Chutney parang

Regional scenes
- Indo-Caribbean

Other topics
- Baithak Gana

Chutney music (Note: Caribbean Hindustani: चटनी संगीत, 𑂒𑂗𑂢𑂲 𑂮𑂑𑂹𑂏𑂲𑂞, چٹنی موسیقی) is a fusion genre that blends Indian classical and folk music, including Bhojpuri folk music, with Indian filmi music and Caribbean calypso and soca music. This genre of music that developed in Trinidad and Tobago amongst Indo-Trinidadians is popular in Trinidad and Tobago, Guyana, Suriname, Jamaica, other parts of the Caribbean, Fiji, Mauritius, and South Africa. Chutney music emerged mid-20th century and reached a peak of popularity during the 1980s-90s. Several sub-genres have developed, most notably chutney soca and chutney parang.

== History ==
The term chutney is derived from the Hindi word chatni, referring to South Asian condiments made of spices. The contemporary fusion of genres that led to chutney music was created around the 1940s by Indo-Caribbean people of the West Indies, whose ancestors originally were brought to the region from the Hindi Belt as indentured labourers by the British, intended to replace slaves working on sugar plantations after slavery was abolished in the region. There were no recordings of chutney until 1968, when Ramdew Chaitoe, of Suriname, recorded an early rendition of the music. The album was called King of Suriname and all of the songs were religious in nature. However, Chaitoe soon became a household name with East Indians, not just in his native Suriname but throughout the Caribbean. Although the songs were religious in nature, all had a distinctly danceable sound. For the first time, Indo-Caribbeans had music that spoke to them personally, and was not specifically Indian, African, or European or American in style/roots. This was a breakthrough for East Indian Caribbean music, but the fame was shortlived.

Chutney music exploded, again, after 1968, with the singer Dropati releasing her album Let's Sing & Dance, made-up of traditional wedding songs. The record became a huge hit within the Indo-Caribbean community, gaining exposure for chutney music as a legitimate form of music, and uniting Indians, regardless of their birthplace.

1969 was a turning point for chutney music, when record producer Moean Mohammed recorded Sundar Popo with Harry Mahabir's BWIA Orchestra. Sundar Popo modernised the music by including western guitars and early electronics into his music. Although Popo became known as the "Father of Chutney" and the "King of Chutney", the art of singing songs in "chutney" style was introduced by a singer named Lakhan Kariya, from the town of Felicity, Chaguanas who preceded Sundar Popo. Other artistes, such as Indo-Trinidaian artistes Sam Boodram, Budram Hollas, Rakesh Yankaran, Anand Yankaran, Heeralal Rampartap, Rasika Dindial, Ramrajie Prabhoo, Lily Ramcharan, and Molly Ramcharan, followed in his footsteps, adding newer and modern instrumentation into songs. Chutney music, until then, remained a localised genre in Trinidad and Tobago, Guyana, and Suriname.

== Musical style ==
The modern chutney artist writes lyrics in either Caribbean Hindustani or English, then lays them over beats derived from Indian dholak beats mixed with the soca beat.

Chutney is an uptempo song, accompanied by bass guitar, drum machine, electric guitar, synthesizer, dholak, harmonium, and dhantal, tassa played in rhythms imported from filmi, calypso or soca. Early chutney was religious in nature sung by mainly women in Trinidad and Tobago. Chutney is unusual in the predominance of female musicians in its early years, although it has since become more gender-mixed.

Early chutney pioneers include Sundar Popo, Rakesh Yankaran, Heeralal Rampartap, Babla & Kanchan, Dropati, and Ramdew Chaitoe.

== Instrumentation ==
Chutney music is typically played with the dholak, dhantal and harmonium. The melody of the music is provided by the harmonium, and the dholak and dhantal for the rhythm. More modernly, drum machines playing tassa have been incorporated into chutney as well. Tassa is drumming used in the Muslim Hosay festival, and is also played during Hindu weddings and other celebrations.

== Languages ==
Chutney music is sung in Caribbean English, Caribbean Hindustani, and sometimes other Indian languages. Modern chutney music incorporates more English.

== Subgenres ==
The origin of chutney being in the Caribbean has meant that it has been in close contact with different peoples, traditions, and other musical styles since its inception. Chutney has fused with other genres, creating an array of syncretic subgenres. Chutney soca is the most notable of these, as it has become virtually indistinguishable from what is considered normal chutney in recent years. Singer Drupatee Ramgoonai coined the term with the release of her album, "Chatnee Soca," in 1987. The style had an emphasis on Hindi lyrics and the beats of the dholak and dhantal. It was further popularized by the 1994 album, "Soca Chutney," by Sonny Mann. It was credited as the best selling Indo-Caribbean album ever, with its title track hitting the top of charts not only in the Caribbean, but in the United States, Canada, and England.
