= Tassa =

Caribbean drum ensemble with Indian roots

In Trinidad and Tobago, and other parts of the Caribbean, the term tassa refers to a drumming ensemble drawn from an amalgamation of various North Indian folk drumming traditions, most importantly dhol-tasha, a style that remains popular today in many parts of India and Pakistan. Beginning in the 1830s and lasting until 1918, dhol-tasha was taken around the world by Indian workers, mostly from present-day Bihar and Uttar Pradesh, enmeshed in a global scheme of indentured labor in British, French, and Dutch territories.

== History ==
Tassa is a drum ensemble with ancient Persian origins, also known as Taash or Taasha drums. These drums disseminated to the Indian subcontinent with the Mughal migration, and from India spread worldwide with the Indian diaspora. The tassa drum proper is a conical or bowl-shaped nagaara- (aka nagada or nagaada) type drum which is played with a heavy bass drum called dhol, or simply "bass", and brass cymbals or metal shakers called jhaanj or jhaal (Hindi/Sanskrit). Tassa-dhol ensembles of three to five players are especially common in street processions, whether associated with Indian weddings, political rallies, Hindu festivals, or Muslim festivals, especially Muharram (known as "Hosay" in Jamaica and Trinidad, a colloquialization of Hussain). In Maharashtra, ensembles of several dozen drummers compete in festivities honoring the deity Ganesh. Drummers in these ensembles are often amateurs, or specialists in other drum traditions. Brought by indentured workers to the Caribbean, Fiji, Mauritius, and Africa in the 19th century, tassa ensembles have flourished with great dynamism in Trinidad and Tobago, where they were used in the Hindu Phagwah, Muslim Hosay festival, and also in Florida, the New York metropolitan area, the United Kingdom, the Netherlands, Texas, the Greater Toronto Area, California, Australia, New Zealand, and various other places where Indo-Caribbean and Indo-Fijian diasporic communities are found.

== Instrument construction ==
Traditionally, the tassa is made by tightly covering a clay shell with goat skin, using an intricate, archaic process. The hides of monkey, deer, and horse are periodically used. When ready to play, the goat skin is heated by aid of a fire to tighten the head, making the pitch higher. This process is called "standing it up". In this way, the pitch can stay high for 20–30 minutes, until the heat dissipates from both the skin and the inside of the drum. Contemporary tassa drums are made by cutting an empty coolant tank or buoy in half and attaching a synthetic drum skin to the top of it with nuts and bolts, welding it shut. Synthetic drums do last longer and do not have to be adjusted as frequently. Although synthetic drums last longer, they deviate from the long-standing tradition of clay and goatskin and, according to some connoisseurs and aficionados, do not sound as well due to its limited range of pitch and cold, metallic, twangy tones.

Bass drums are usually constructed from a single piece of tree trunk, usually mango or cedar, which is hollowed out by either lathe or hand. Older, larger drums were made of the dense but light weight cottonwood tree which is rarely found today. Some bass drum shells are made of maple ply-wood, others have a barrel stave construction. The drum shell is covered on both sides by goat skins which are pulled tightly with rope. Different amounts of "massala", a proprietary thick, sticky, tar-like concoction, is placed in the insides of the skin to create a lower frequency resonation on the "bass" side hit with a stick, and a higher frequency resonation on the more "treble" side hit with the hand. The deep, booming sounds of bass drums can be heard from long distances. The flair and machismo of a tassa group usually falls to the bass player, the playing style of which can range from stationary and reserved to flamboyant, aggressive and punishing, the latter of which has been termed "break away". When two or more groups compete, it is often the loudest bass drum(s) which can lead to victory.

== Repertoire and performance ==
The typical tassa group is as follows: the lead tassa player is called the "cutter" or "cut-man". The cutter plays the main, pulsating rhythm, or taal, or hand. The second tassa player is known as the "fulley" or "fuller", as their role is to make the rhythm or "taal" sound more full. The fulley plays a steady rhythm usually a simplified version of the main hand but in same metre and mode. The bass drummer adds power and depth to the taal with a constant, ground-shaking beat. The jhaanj man or brass man (sometimes played by a woman) plays the cymbals which enrich the overall sound of the ensemble with piercing or smooth metallic brass sounds creating by vibrating one cymbal against the other.

The rhythms (hands, taal) are quite complex and each have many variations, including variations between the North of Trinidad and the South of Trinidad. Some basic hands are tikora, wedding tikora, bete drum, wedding hand, nagaara, chutney, dingolay, soca, and chaubola. "Classical" hands include kalinda, khemta, bhajan, thumri, and daadra. Hosay (Muharram) festival rhythms include saada mahaatam, chalta mahaatam, teen choppa, dead hand, and nabi sarwar/sarbat.

The tassa drums are played with sticks made from wild cane (called chob, Hindi for cane sticks) or fiberglass. The sticks can either have very tightly wound masking tape at the top or the sap from a balata tree wound into a ball can form the head of a stick. When played, these pliant sticks are struck on the head of the drum and accomplish a unique sound because the flexibility of the stick is responsible for the roll rather than the regressive bouncing action of the head of the stick.
