= Dhantal =

Percussion instrument

The dhantal (dandtal) is a long steel rod based percussion instrument (sounding similar to the triangle), which was adapted from the iron "bows" which yoked the oxen that pulled the carts on the estates in Guyana, Suriname, Trinidad and Tobago, other parts of the Caribbean, and Fiji. The original beater (which is called a kartaal/taali) was an actual horseshoe, a shape which is still retained in the modern dhantal's beater. The top of the dhantal may be blunt or tapered to a fine point to allow for greater resonance, and its end is shaped into a circle that rests on the ground, table, or other surface when it is played. Dhantal sizes can range anywhere from 3–6 feet (0.91–1.83 m) in length and 0.375–0.5 inches (9.5–12.7 mm) in diametre. The dhantal is an important instrument in Indo-Caribbean music styles, such as Chutney, Baithak Gana and Taan Singing.

== History ==
The dhantal (also called the dhandataal) is of Indian origin, but most commonly found in the Caribbean and Fiji. The instrument was invented in the Caribbean by indentured laborers from India. The instrument's name literally means "stick percussion" from danda, "stick," and taal, the act of striking rhythmically.

== Technique ==
The rod is gripped with the player's weaker hand while the beater is held in the dominant hand. The amount of resonance is controlled by opening and closing the hand that is holding the rod. The dhantal's timbre is sharply metallic and provides a clearly defined taal (beat or pulse) to help the ensemble stay in rhythmic sync. The basic rhythm of the dhantal is an ostinato consisting of two sixteenth-notes followed by an eighth-note. An example of how the Dhantal works can be seen in the Dhantal Lesson YouTube video.

== See also ==
- Chutney music
