= List of Trinidadians and Tobagonians =

Below is a list of notable Trinidadians and Tobagonians, people from Trinidad and Tobago or of Trinidadian and Tobagonian descent.

== Notable Trinbagonian nationals ==
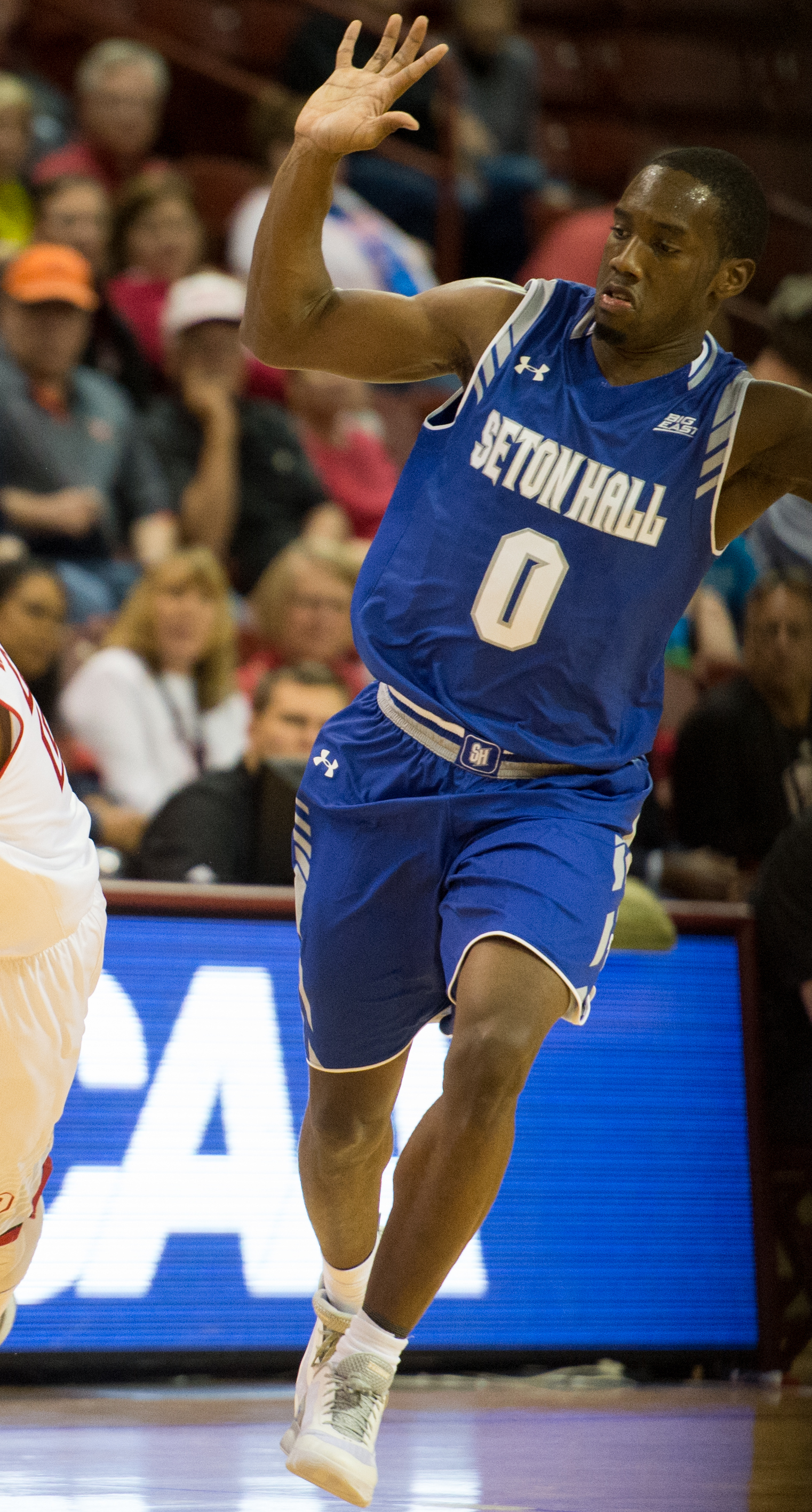
Khadeen Carrington

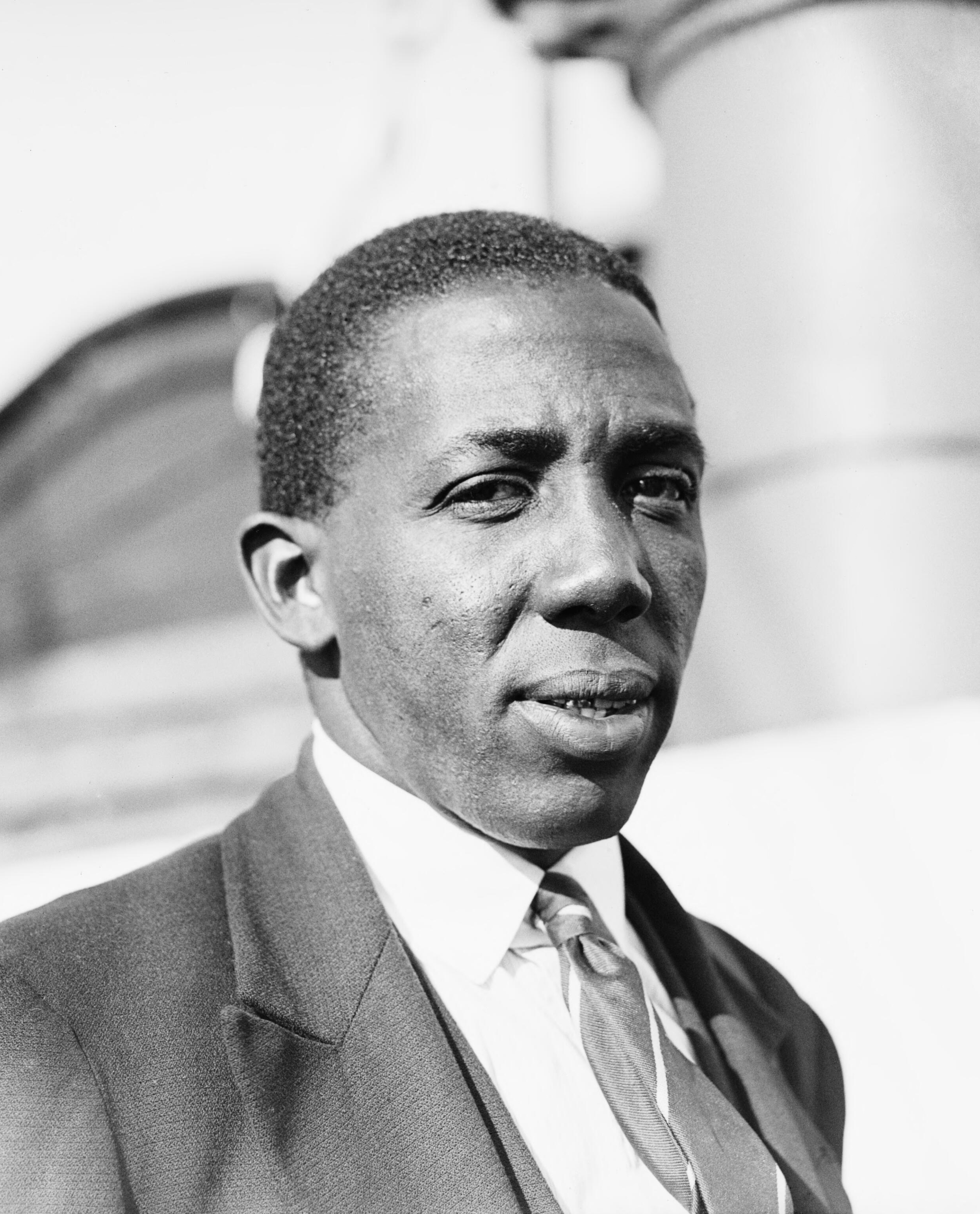
Learie Constantine

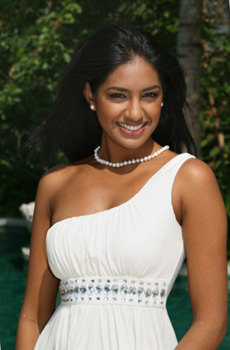
Valene Maharaj

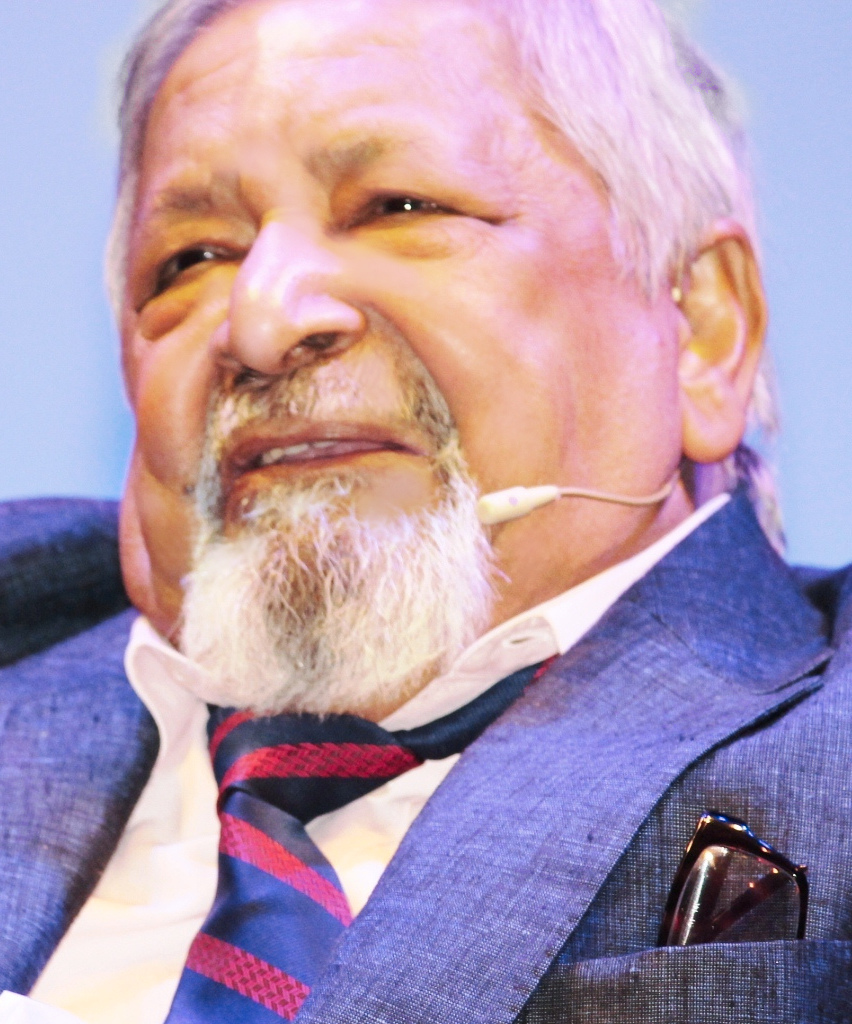
VS Naipaul

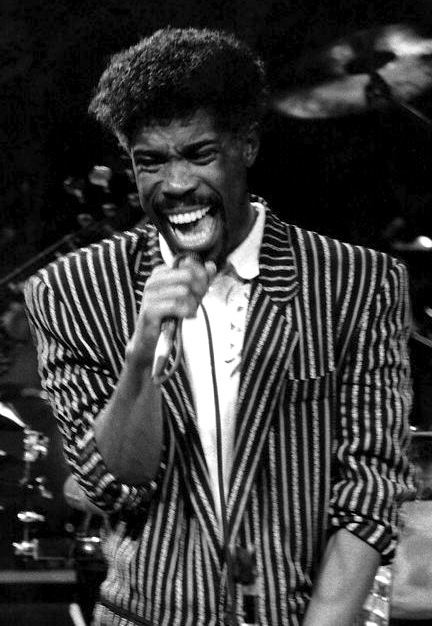
Billy Ocean

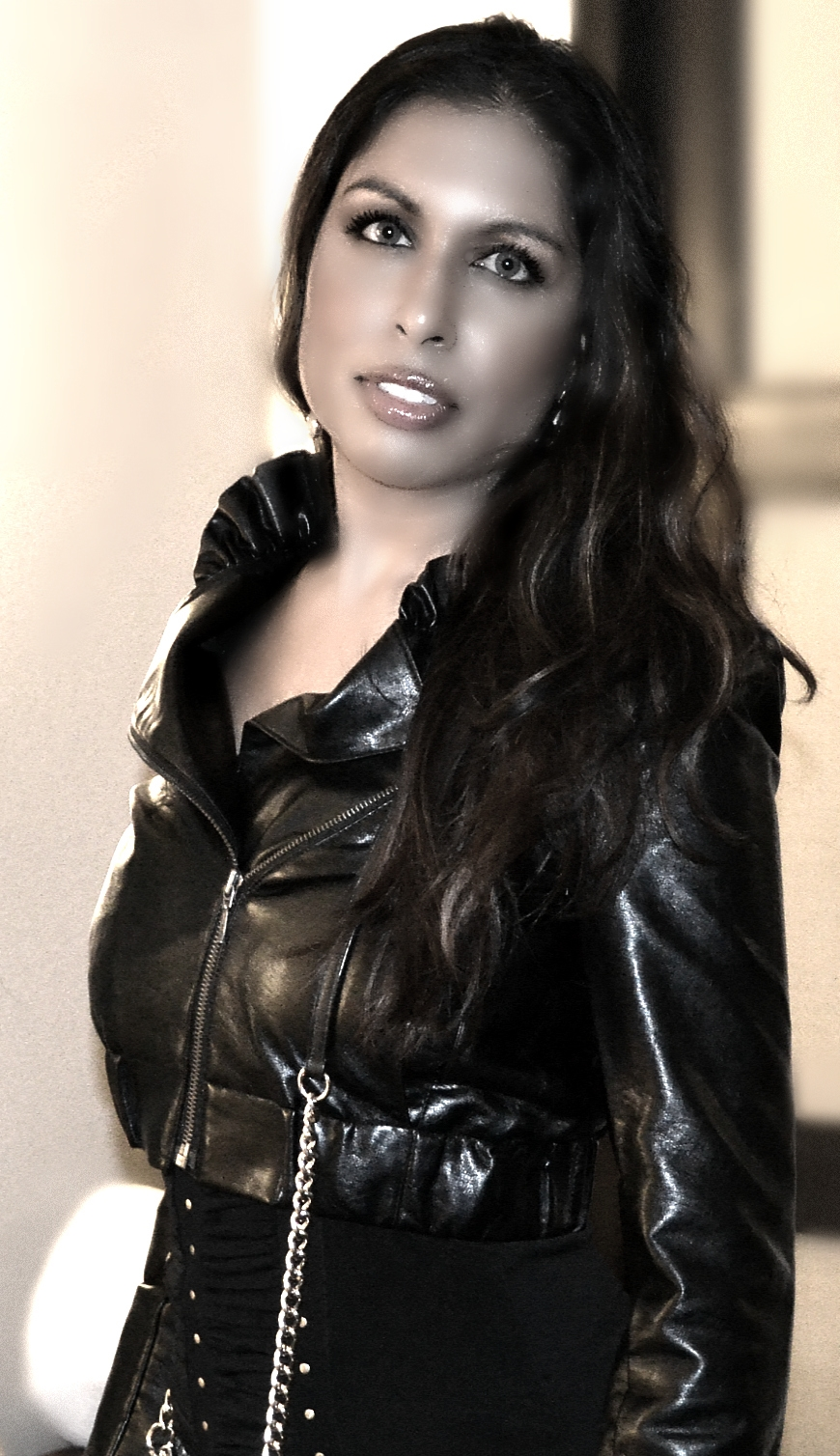
Ria Persad

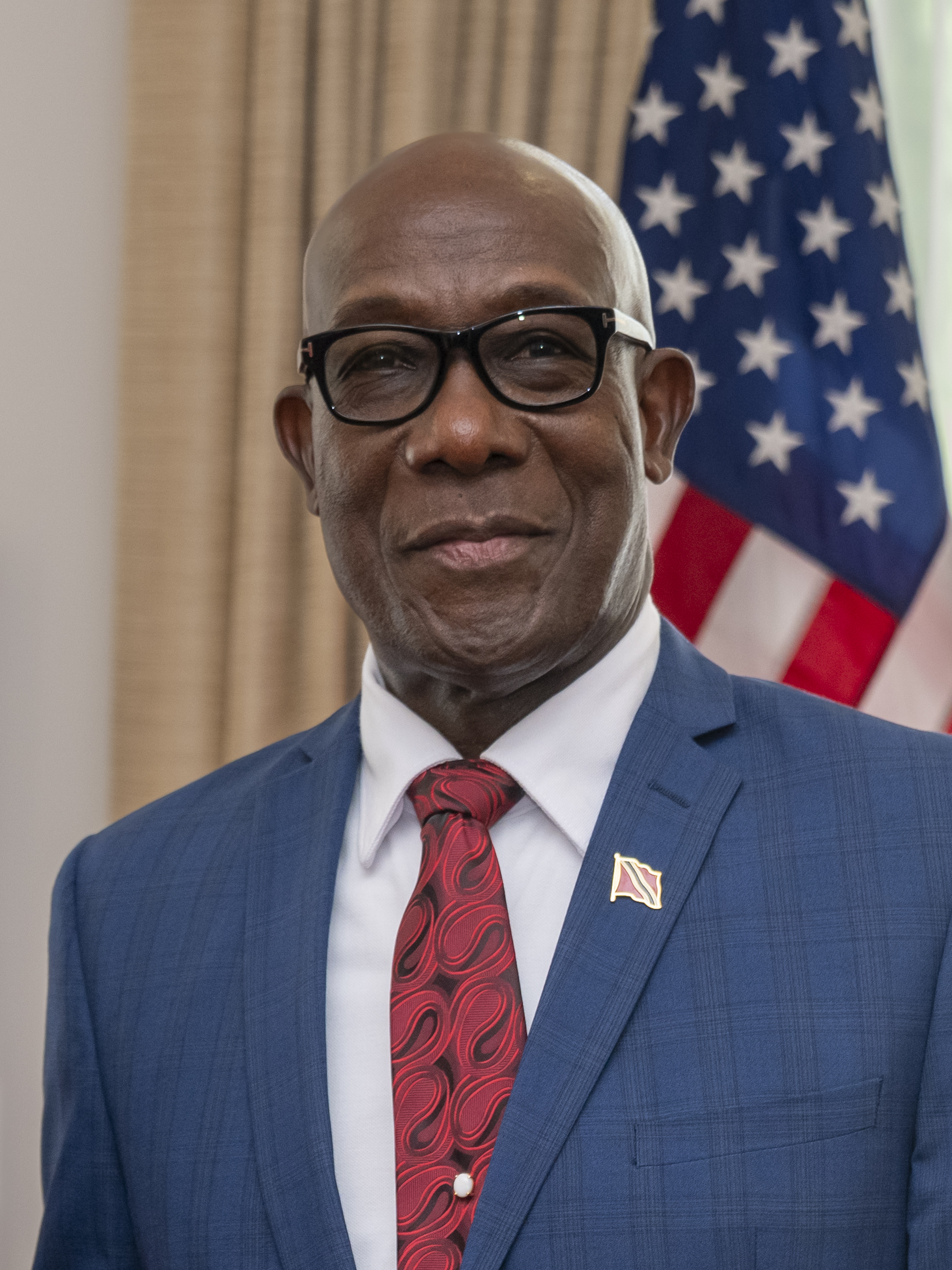
Keith Rowley

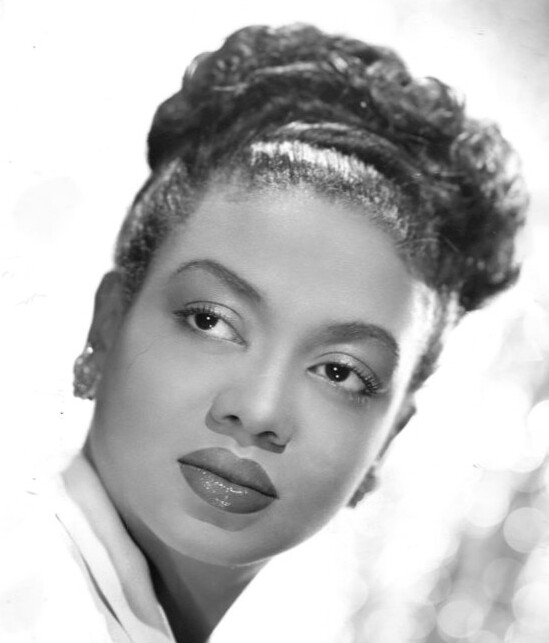
Hazel Scott

- A. N. R. Robinson, President
- Ackbar Khan, Commissioner of Affidavits and Justice of the Peace
- Adesh Samaroo, singer
- Adrian Barath, cricketer
- Adrian Cola Rienzi, trade unionist, civil rights activist, politician, and lawyer.
- Albert Gomes, unionist, politician, and writer
- Alfred Mendes (1897–1991), novelist and short-story writer
- Allan Alvarez (also known as Cheese), speedrunner
- Amit Jaggernauth, cricketer
- Anantanand Rambachan, professor of religion
- André Tanker, musician
- Anisa Mohammed
- Annie Dookhan, American chemist
- Anslem Douglas, musician and composer
- Anthony Carmona, politician
- Anthony Joseph, poet
- Anya Ayoung-Chee
- Arnold Rampersad
- Ato Boldon, Olympic sprinter
- Attila the Hun, calypsonian
- Bas Balkissoon, politician
- Basdeo Panday, former Prime Minister of Trinidad and Tobago
- Bhadase Sagan Maraj
- Billy Ocean, Trinidadian-British singer-songwriter
- Black Stalin, calypsonian
- Boscoe Holder, painter
- Boysie Singh
- Brian Lara, cricketer
- Brother Resistance, musician
- C. L. R. James
- Caleb Wales, FIFA assistant football referee
- Carl Herrera, basketball player
- Céline Gittens, ballerina
- Chalkdust, calypsonian
- Charran Kamkaran Singh, cricketer
- Choc'late Allen
- Chris Bisson
- Cindy Devika Sharma
- Crazy, calypsonian
- Daisy Voisin
- Darcus Howe, racial justice campaigner
- Daren Ganga, cricketer
- Jason Gooding
- Davan Maharaj
- David Rudder, calypsonian
- Dean Marshall
- Denesh Ramdin, cricketer
- Dennis Francis, diplomat
- Denyse Plummer, calypsonian
- Denzil Botus, pianist
- Destra Garcia
- Devant Maharaj
- Dinanath Ramnarine, cricketer
- Dole Chadee (Nankissoon Boodram)
- Dominique Jackson, trans right activist, model, Pose star
- Donald Ramsamooj, cricketer
- Drupatee Ramgoonai
- Dwight Yorke
- Earl Lovelace
- Eden Shand
- Edmundo Ros, musician, bandleader, arranger
- Edwin Carrington
- Ellie Mannette
- Elliott Skinner (anthropologist of Burkina Faso and US Ambassador)
- Emraan Ali
- Eric Williams
- Errol Duke ("The Growler"), calypsonian
- Errol Sitahal
- Floella Benjamin
- Folade Mutota, politician and activist
- Gailon Su
- Geoffrey Holder
- George Chambers
- George 'Sonny' Goddard
- Gerry Bednob
- Giselle Laronde
- Gino J.H. McKoy, director
- Greg Ranjitsingh
- Growling Tiger, calypsonian
- Gypsy, calypsonian
- Haddaway
- Haji Gokool Meah
- Harold Sonny Ladoo
- Hasely Crawford
- Hazel Scott, jazz and classical pianist and singer
- Hazelle Goodman, actress
- Heather Headley
- Hedy Fry
- Heeralal Rampartap
- Hermat Gangapersad, cricketer
- Hubert Julian
- Ian Bishop, cricketer
- Ian Hanomansing
- Imran N. Hosein
- Inshan Ali, cricketer
- Ira Mathur
- Ishwar Maraj, cricketer
- Janelle Commissiong, Miss Universe
- Jean Pierre, netball player, coach and politician
- Jean Ramjohn-Richards
- Jeanine De Bique, soprano
- Jennifer Carroll, politician
- Jennifer Cassar, cultural activist and civil servant
- Jit Samaroo, musician
- Jo-Anne Sewlal, arachnologist
- Junglepussy, rapper
- John Agitation, comedian
- Kamla Persad-Bissessar, lawyer and prime minister
- Keith Rowley, former prime minister
- Kendall Jagdeosingh, footballer
- Kenneth Ramchand, academic and writer
- Kevin Baldeosingh, newspaper columnist, author, and humanist
- Khadeen Carrington (born 1995), Israeli-Trinidadian-American basketball player for Hapoel Jerusalem
- Khalid Hassanali, businessman
- Kimberly Farrah Singh, beauty pageant titleholder
- Krishna Maharaj, British Trinidadian businessman
- Lakshmi Persaud, author
- Lakshmi Singh, journalist
- Lall Ramnath Sawh, urologist
- Lancelot Layne, musician
- Lauryn Williams, springer and bobsledder
- Learie Constantine, Baron Constantine, cricketer, lawyer, and politician
- Lennox Mohammed, musician
- Lennox Sharpe, musician
- Lionel Belasco (1881 –1967), also known as "Lanky" Belasco, pianist, arranger, composer, promoter, and bandleader
- Lloyd Best, intellectual, columnist, professor, and economist
- Lord Beginner, calypsonian
- Lord Creator, musician
- Lord Invader, musician
- Lord Kitchener, calypsonian
- Lord Melody, musician
- Lorraine Toussaint, actress
- Lovey's String Band, band
- Machel Montano, musician
- Mahaboob Ben Ali, businessman
- Manny Ramjohn, athlete
- Marlon Asher, reggae singer
- Maximus Dan, musician
- Mercedes Carvajal de Arocha, first female elected to the Senate of Venezuela
- Michael Ellis Fisher (1931 – 2021), English physicist, chemist, and mathematician
- Michelle Antoine, neuroscientist
- Michelle Borel
- Mighty Panther, calypsonian
- Mighty Shadow, calypsonian
- Mighty Sparrow, calypsonian
- Mighty Spoiler, calypsonian
- Mighty Terror, calypsonian
- Mike Bibby
- Naomi Chin Wing, fashion model
- Neeshan Prabhoo
- Neil Bissoondath
- Nicholas Pooran, cricketer
- Nicki Minaj, musician
- Noor Mohamed Hassanali
- PartyNextDoor, musician
- Parvati Khan
- Patrick Castagne
- Patrick Manning, politician
- Peter Minshall, carnival artist
- Pundit Sahadeo Tiwari
- Rabi Maharaj
- Rajendra Persaud
- Rajindra Dhanraj, cricketer
- Rakesh Yankaran, musician
- Ralph de Boissière
- Ralph Maraj
- Rangy Nanan, cricketer
- Ranji Chandisingh
- Ras Shorty I
- Ravi Bissambhar
- Ravi Rampaul, cricketer
- Rayad Emrit, cricketer
- Raymond Ramcharitar
- Reema Harrysingh-Carmona
- Ria Carlo (née Persad)
- Ria Ramnarine
- Rikki Jai
- Roaring Lion, calypsonian
- Robert Greenidge
- Robindra Ramnarine Singh
- Rudolph Walker
- Rudranath Capildeo
- Russell Leonce
- Sam Boodram
- Sam Manning, musician
- Sam Mendes (born 1965), English filmmaker and stage director
- Sampson Nanton
- Samuel Badree
- Samuel Selvon
- Sandra Ramdhanie
- Satnarayan Maharaj
- Seepersad Naipaul
- Shani Mootoo
- Sharlene Flores
- Shiva Naipaul
- Showkat Baksh, cricketer
- Simbhoonath Capildeo
- Simone Harris
- Sir Lancelot, singer
- Solomon Hochoy
- Sonny Caldinez
- Sonny Ramadhin, bowler
- Subhashchandra Pandharinath Gupte, cricketer
- Su-lay Su
- Sundar Popo, musician
- Sunil Narine, cricketer
- Superblue
- Suruj Ragoonath, cricketer
- Surujpat Mathura
- Surujrattan Rambachan
- The Mad Stuntman
- Tony Springer
- Tracy Quan
- Travis World, DJ & music producer
- Trevor McDonald, Sir Trevor, UK News Reporter
- Trinidad James, Trinidadian-American rapper
- V. S. Naipaul, writer
- Vahni Capildeo
- Valene Maharaj, model
- Valentina Medina
- Vashtie Kola
- Vena Jules, educator
- Wendy Fitzwilliam
- Wendy Rahamut
- Wilmoth Houdini, singer
- Winifred Atwell, British pianist
- Winston Dookeran, politician and economist
- Winston Duke, actor
- Wintley Phipps, Trinidadian-American singer, songwriter, record producer, and minister
- Young Tiger, musician

== Notable people of Trinbagonian descent ==
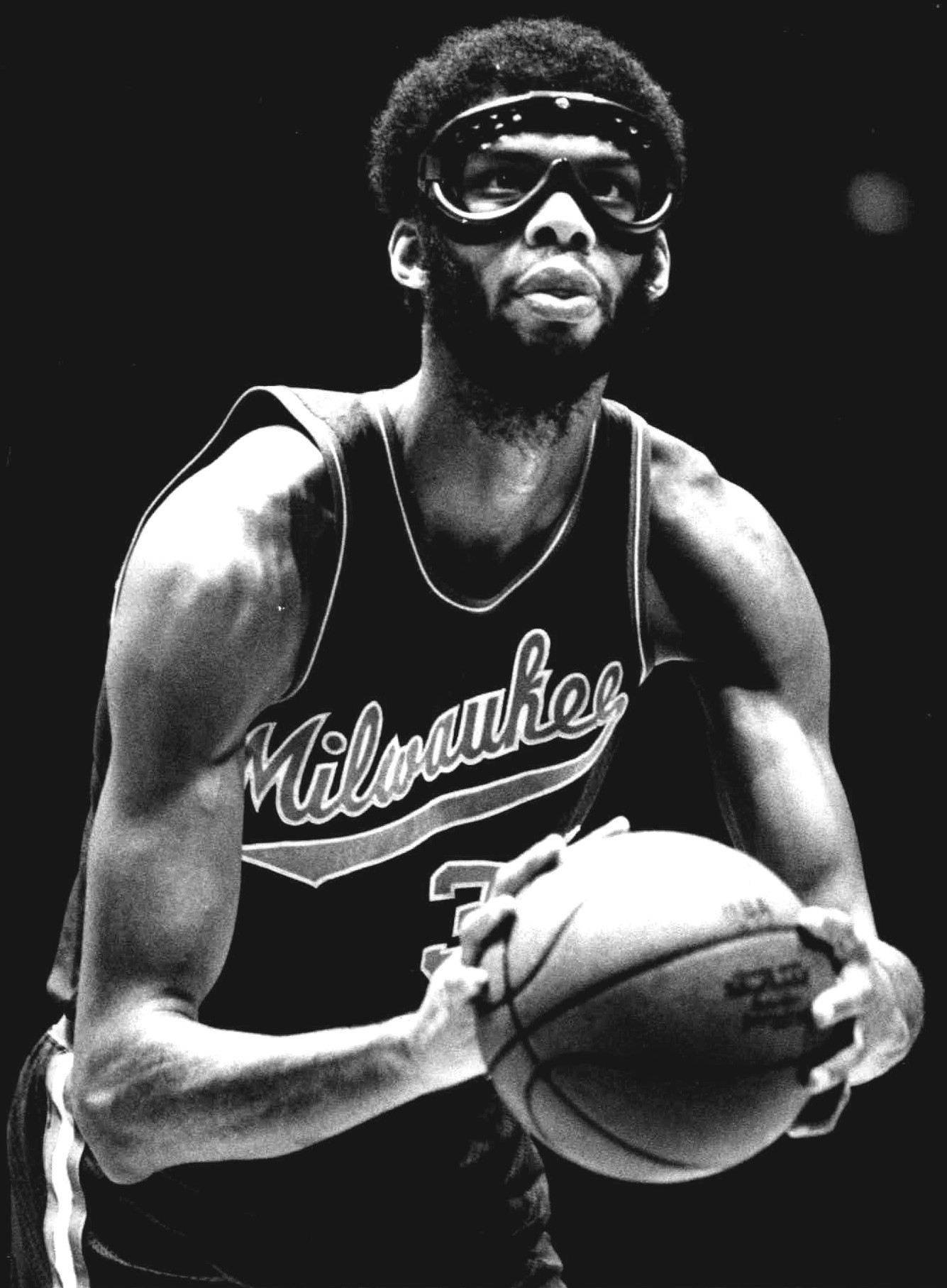
Kareem Abdul-Jabbar

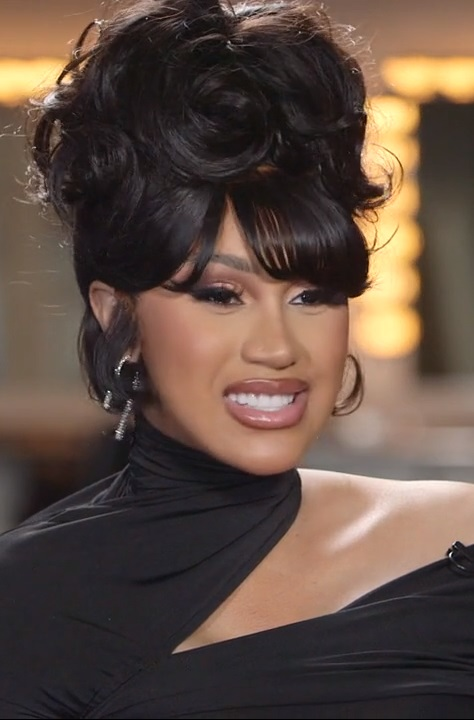
Cardi B

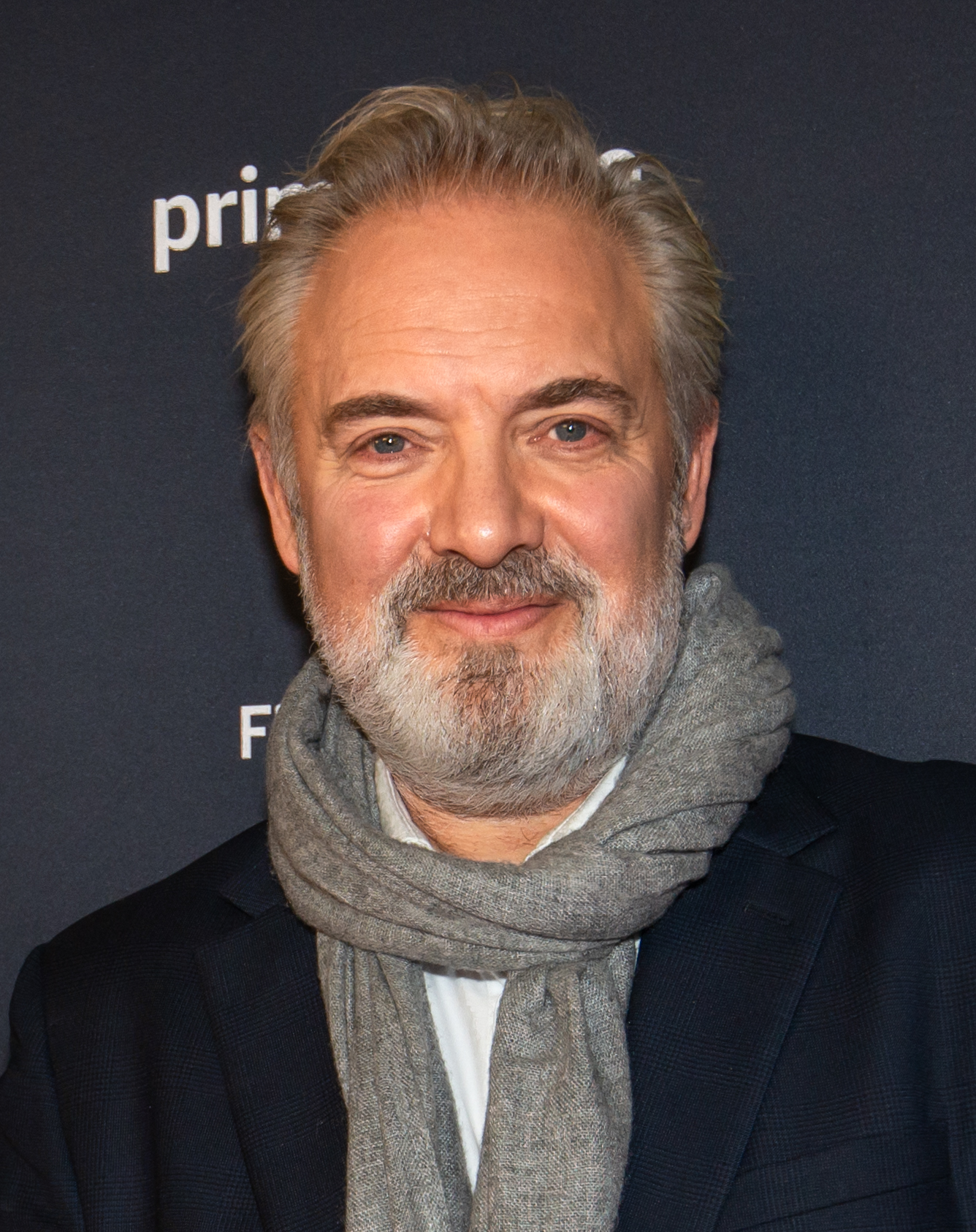
Sam Mendes

- Affion Crockett, American actor, writer, dancer, rapper, comedian, music producer
- AJ Tracey, British rapper
- Alfonso Ribeiro
- Cardi B, American rapper
- Danny Cipriani, English rugby union player
- Daymond John
- Errol Barrow
- Errol Louis
- Foxy Brown, American rapper
- Gabrielle Reece
- Harry Schachter, Canadian biochemist and glycobiologist
- Jadon Sancho, English footballer
- Jessica Sula, Welsh actress
- Jihad Ali, American jihadist
- Johnny Christmas, American lacrosse player
- Kareem Abdul-Jabbar, American basketball player
- Kai Cenat, American internet personality
- Kingsley Ben-Adir (born 1986), British actor
- Marger Sealey, singer, songwriter, and actress
- MF Doom
- Nia Long, American actress
- Nicki Minaj, American rapper
- Roger Gaspard
- Ronda Rousey, UFC fighter
- Roy Hibbert
- Sam Mendes, British film and stage director, producer, and screenwriter
- Shari Headley, American actress
- Sheff G, American rapper
- Sylven Landesberg (born 1990), American-Israeli-Austrian basketball player for Hapoel Haifa in the Israeli Basketball Premier League
- Tatyana Ali, American actress and singer
- Teyana Taylor, American singer, songwriter, actress, dancer, choreographer, and music video director
- Waheed Alli, Baron Alli, British media entrepreneur and politician
- Winston Duke, actor

== Notable residents of Trinidad and Tobago ==
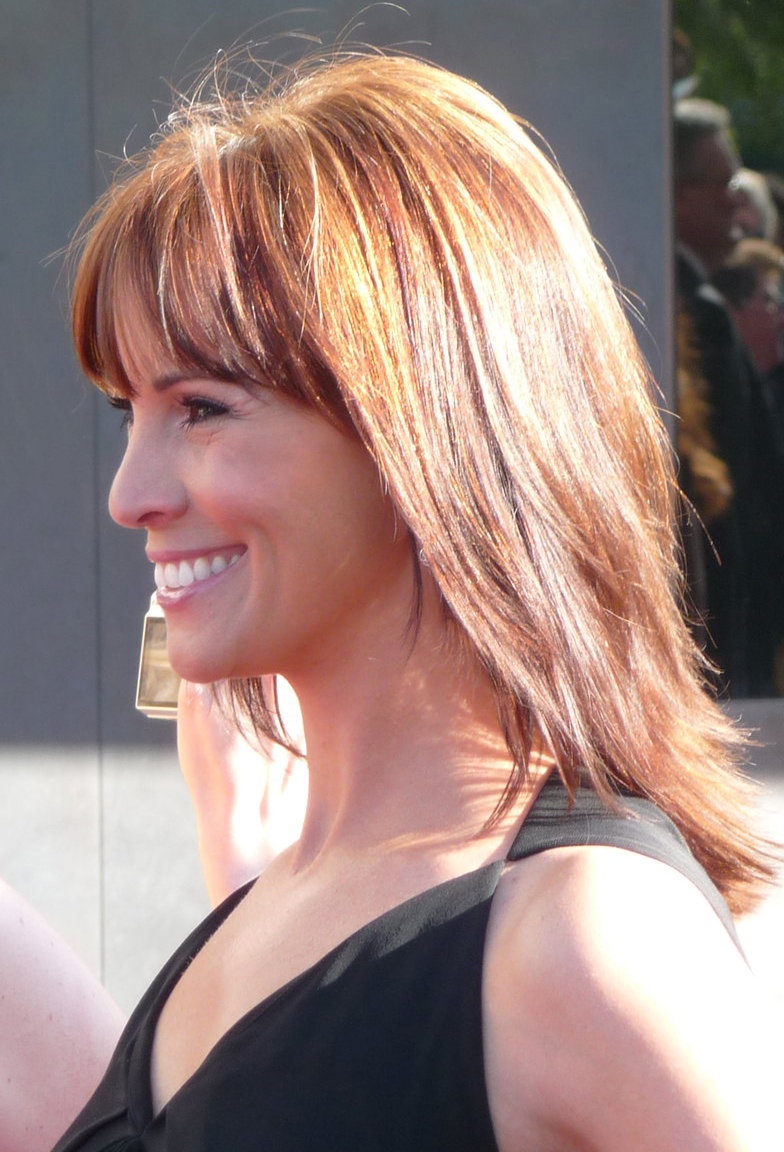
Andrea McLean

- Andrea McLean (born 1969), Scottish journalist and television presenter
- Chris Ofili (born 1968), British painter
- Derek Walcott (1930–2017), Saint Lucian poet and playwright
- Edward Lanza Joseph (c. 1792–1838), journalist, playwright, and author
- Lionel Belasco (1881–1967), pianist, composer, and bandleader
- Peter Doig (born 1959), Scottish painter
- Sylvia Kacal (1939–2003), British-Trinidadian conservationist, teacher and art patron
- Tubal Uriah Butler (1897–1977), Grenadian-born labour leader

== See also ==
- List of people by nationality
