= List of Indo–Trinidadians and Tobagonians =

This is a list of notable Indo–Trinidadians and Tobagonians.

== Politics and government ==
- Basdeo Panday
- Kamla Persad-Bissesar
- Noor Hassanali
- Christine Kangaloo
- Rudranath Capildeo
- Simbhoonath Capildeo
- Ramesh Maharaj
- Bhadase Sagan Maraj
- Roodal Moonilal
- Adrian Cola Rienzi
- Ashford Sinanan
- Rohan Sinanan
- Ranji Chandisingh
- Dana Seetahal
- Kenneth Lalla
- Sarran Teelucksingh
- George F. Fitzpatrick
- Isaac Hyatali
- Satnarine Sharma
- Hardeo Hardath
- Isaac Hyatali
- Richie Sookhai
- Kamaluddin Mohammed
- Renuka Sagramsingh-Sooklal
- Ravi Balgobin Maharaj
- Deoroop Teemal

== Literature ==
- Neil Bissoondath
- Vahni Capildeo
- Ismith Khan
- Seepersad Naipaul
- Shiva Naipaul
- V. S. Naipaul
- Kenneth Vidia Parmasad
- Lakshmi Persaud
- Kris Rampersad
- Kenneth Ramchand
- Rabi Maharaj
- Harold Sonny Ladoo
- Shani Mootoo
- Bhaskar Sunkara
- Kevin Jared Hosein
- Sam Selvon

== Sports ==
- Samuel Badree
- Denesh Ramdin
- Ravi Rampaul
- Manny Ramjohn
- Sunil Narine
- Daren Ganga
- Hermat Gangapersad
- Robin Singh
- Adrian Barath
- Inshan Ali
- Rayad Emrit
- Rangy Nanan
- Sonny Ramadhin
- Rajindra Dhanraj
- Amit Jaggernauth
- Ishwar Maraj
- Suruj Ragoonath
- Dinanath Ramnarine
- Charran Singh
- Subhash Gupte
- Greg Ranjitsingh
- Anisa Mohammed
- Nicholas Pooran
- Gopaul Sahadeo
- Kendall Jagdeosingh
- Ria Ramnarine
- Vikash Mohan
- Dave Mohammed
- Capil Rampersad
- Rajesh Latchoo
- Aditi Soondarsingh
- Amarnath Basdeo
- Donald Ramsamooj
- Karishma Ramharack
- Sookval Samaroo
- Amanda Samaroo
- Amir Jangoo

== Arts and entertainment ==
- Sundar Popo
- Sam Boodram
- Ravi Bissambhar
- Rikki Jai
- Rakesh Yankaran
- Parvati Khan
- Heeralal Rampartap
- Adesh Samaroo
- Drupatee Ramgoonai
- Jit Samaroo
- Neeshan Prabhoo
- Lakshmi Singh
- Gerry Bednob
- Errol Sitahal
- Chris Bisson
- Valene Maharaj
- Ian Hanomansing
- Ira Mathur
- Wendy Rahamut
- Lennox Mohammed
- Surujpat Mathura
- Kimberly Farrah Singh
- Chandini Chanka
- Shelly Dass
- Niala Boodhoo
- Al Ramsawack
- John Agitation
- Sintra Bronte
- M. P. Alladin

== STEM & medicine ==
- Rajendra Persaud
- Krishan Kumar
- Lall Ramnath Sawh
- Jean Ramjohn-Richards
- Sandra Ramdhanie
- Ria Persad
- Anna Mahase
- Stella Abidh
- Joan Latchman
- Rudranath Capildeo
- Harold Ramkissoon

== Business, economics, and finance ==
- Krishna Maharaj
- Haji Gokool Meah
- Reema Harrysingh-Carmona
- Sarran Teelucksingh
- Avinash Persaud
- Mahaboob Ben Ali
- Helen Bhagwansingh
- Sayeed Khan

== Religion, philanthropy, and philosophy ==
- Bhadase Sagan Maraj
- Pt. Dr. Rampersad Parasram
- Satnarayan Maharaj
- Anantanand Rambachan
- Simbhoonath Capildeo
- Capildeo family
- Sahadeo Tiwari
- Rabi Maharaj
- Imran N. Hosein
- Haji Gokool Meah
- Tara Ramoutar

== Military ==
- Kareem Rashad Sultan Khan, U. S. soldier

== Criminals ==
- Dole Chadee (born Nankissoon Boodram)
- Annie Dookhan
- Boysie Singh
