= Russell Leonce =

- Born: 1978 (age 47–48)
- Origin: Trinidad and Tobago, Caribbean
- Genres: Contemporary Christian Music / Gospel Music
- Occupation: Singer-songwriter / Music Minister
- Years active: 2000–present
- Website: http://www.russellleonce.com

Russell Leonce is a contemporary Christian music singer-songwriter and Music Minister in the Church of the Nazarene Trinidad and Tobago District. He is Caribbean Nazarene College with a Bachelor of Arts Degree in Theology.

== Discography ==
- 2009 "Stand Up"
- 2009 "This Love (Culture of Love)"
- 2009 "Why I Love You (Got to Tell Ya)"
- 2009 "Smile"
- 2009 "Grateful"
- 2009 "Culturelude 2 (Retro Funk)"
- 2009 "Troubles Won’t Last"
- 2009 "Culturelude 3 (Church)"
- 2009 "I Am"
- 2009 "L-I-V-E"
- 2009 "Runaway Child"
- 2009 "Don't Cry"
- 2009 "Unchanging"
- 2013 Yet Will I

== Awards ==
""Independent Music Awards""

- 9th Annual Independent Music Awards Winner 2010 (Gospel Category)
- 2010 Vox Pop Poll Award Winner (People's Choice)

2010 Caribbean Gospel Music Marlin Awards

- Contemporary Vocal Performance of the Year
- Male Individual for "L.I.V.E.", Contemporary Recording of the Year for "Smile"
- Packaging of the Year for the Album, "Culture of Love"
