= Lirim Sylejmani =

Kosovo-born American citizen who joined the Islamic State

- Born: 1976 (age 49–50); Kosovo
- Other name: Abu Sulayman al-Kosovi
- Citizenship: USA
- Education: University of Illinois Chicago
- Known for: Westerner who joined the Islamic State
- Children: 3 (1 deceased)
- Criminal charges: conspiracy to provide material support or resources to a designated foreign terrorist organization; providing and attempting to provide material support or resources to a designated foreign terrorist organization; receiving military-type training from a foreign terrorist organization
- Penalty: 10 years in prison

Lirim Sylejmani (sometimes spelled Lirim Sulejmani) (born 1976) is a Kosovo-born naturalized American citizen who traveled to Syria and joined the Islamic State of Iraq and the Levant in 2015. In December 2024, he pleaded guilty to three felony charges connected to his ISIL membership. He was sentenced to ten years in prison.

== Recruitment by ISIL and life in the Islamic State ==
Sylejmani was born in Kosovo and moved to the United States with his mother and siblings in 1999 when he was 23, fleeing the Bosnian genocide. He was granted refugee status and became an American citizen. He studied civil engineering at the University of Illinois Chicago. He lived in Northbrook, Illinois, married and had three children. One of his daughters died young. After the 2008 recession and his daughter's death, Sylejmani went to Canada, where he says he became more religious.

In November 2015, he traveled with his wife and two surviving children, aged four and one, to Kosovo. From there they flew to Turkey, and a smuggler took them over the Syrian border to join ISIL. In a 2019 interview with journalist Robin Wright, Sylejmani said, "My goal wasn’t to come fight, it was making hegira," and "I did not come to die here. I wanted to live under Sharia. I mean, it was open enrollment." In another media interview he said, "I watched this video, they said we’ll give you housing, free electricity. It just sounded very nice." He denied having watched any ISIL videos depicting violent acts such as beheadings, but said he was aware of their existence.

Sylejmani adopted the nom de guerre Abu Sulayman al-Kosovi when he joined ISIL. After three weeks of military training he was assigned to a battalion in Mosul, Iraq. In the Manbij offensive in May 2016 he was wounded, hit in the legs by shrapnel. In 2017, he was transferred to another battalion. Sylejmani told Wright, "I shot about twenty bullets when I was doing the training in Mosul. And I shot one bullet in a house, by accident, in the ceiling. That’s as much fighting as I did."

== After ISIL ==
After the defeat of ISIL in Baghuz, on February 17, 2019, Sylejmani and his family were captured and Sylejmani was jailed by Syrian Democratic Forces. He told CBS News reporter Holly Williams he had made "in somebody's eyes, the wrong choices, so I face jail time," but said he didn't believe he'd done anything wrong. He told Wright that if given another chance he would still choose to live in a caliphate, saying, "For me, at this point, everything is religious."

Sylejmani asked to be deported to Kosovo, but he was transferred to the United States in 2020 to face criminal charges. He had not lived there since 2011. In December 2024, he pleaded guilty in U.S. District Court to three charges: conspiracy to provide material support or resources to a designated foreign terrorist organization, providing and attempting to provide material support or resources to a designated foreign terrorist organization, and receiving military-type training from a foreign terrorist organization. He was sentenced to ten years in prison, with a lifetime of supervised release to follow.

== See also ==
- Emraan Ali and Jihad Ali
- Omar Shafik Hammami
- Ifthekar Jaman
