= Piparo =

Village in Trinidad

Coordinates: 10°20′N 61°20′W

Piparo is a village in Central Trinidad on the southern edge of the Central Range. The village has three main claims to fame:

1. Piparo was the base of operations of Dole Chadee (born Nankissoon Boodram), a notorious drug lord who was executed in 1999 for the murder of four members of the Baboolal family.
2. Piparo was the home of Ras Shorty I (born Garfield Blackman) during his self-imposed break from the soca world. Living simply in this rural community Ras Shorty-I developed jamoo, a fusion of soca and gospel music.
3. Piparo was the site of a large mud volcano eruption on February 22, 1997. The eruption covered an area of 2.5 km² and displaced 31 families. The mud volcano now lies active where the eruption took place (as of October 2019).

During the early twentieth century, Piparo was an important cocoa bean producer.

The small village is mainly inhabited by people of African and Indian descent. There is a mandir, two mosques, and three churches.

Since the eruption in 1997, an alternative road to the village has been established through the village of Guaracara or a detour around the volcanic site through Panchoo trace.

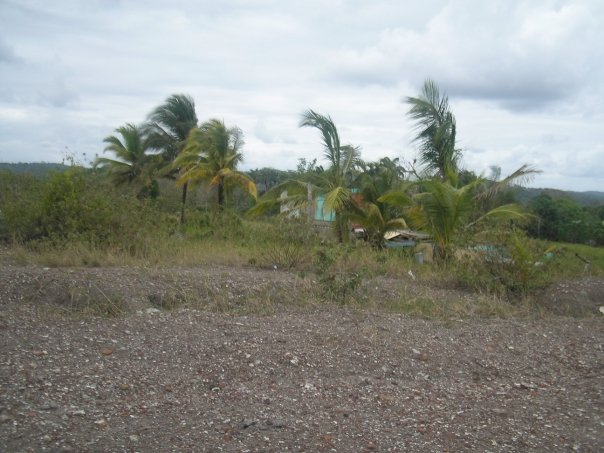
Remnants of the damage, 11 yrs later

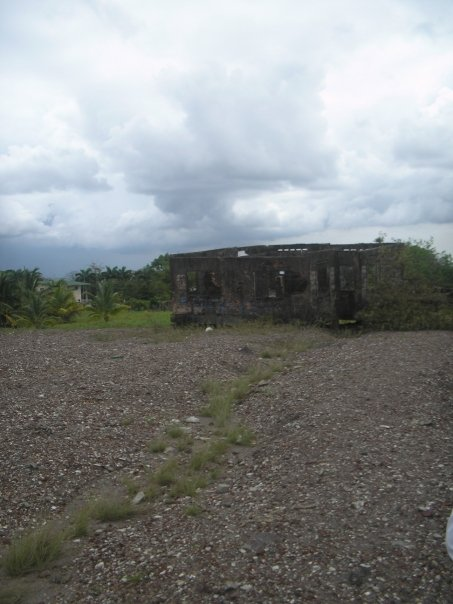
Piparo damage

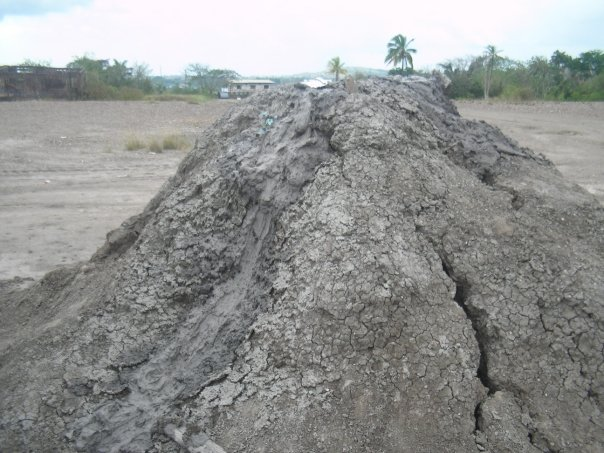
Main vent at Piparo
