= Kenneth Lalla =

Kenneth Lalla S.C. C.M.T (born October 1926) is a lawyer and politician from Trinidad and Tobago, formerly the Democratic Labour Party Member of Parliament for Couva.

He founded K. R. Lalla and Company and has been in practice for the past 50 years. He has had an extensive commercial and administrative law practice. Mr. Lalla S.C. sat as the Chairman of the Police Service Commission, Public Service Commission and Defence Commission and served as a member of the judicial and legal service and a member of the Caribbean Court of Justice Legal Service Commission. He was born in October 1926 learned the alphabet at the age of 17 studied law at Lincoln's Inn and became the MP for Couva at age 36 .He founded the California Literary and Dramatic Club in 1947 (CALDRAC) . He is the author of his autobiography "I am a dream to my village" and "The Public Service and Service Commissions"
