= Sharlene Flores =

Trinidad and Tobago musician

Sharlene Flores, born as Sharlene Ali-Khan in St. Joseph, Trinidad and Tobago, is a singer of parang music.

In 1975 she joined parang band San Jose Serenaders as a background singer. After the death of lead singer Gloria Alcazar she took her position. In 1982 she founded parang band Flores de San Jose together with her husband Wayne Flores.

Flores comes from a muslim family.
