= Simone Harris =

Trinidad and Tobago actress

Simone Harris is a Trinidadian actress and television presenter. Before going into the media industry, she worked in the airline industry for 17 years. She was an actress for the Trinidadian soap opera Westwood Park from 1997 to 2004. Then she became a television presenter for Caribbean News Media Group TV Channel 9 in that country and hosted the new programme Live with Simone, a talk show. She resigned to take up the post of communications manager at the National Flour Mills Company Limited.
