= Vena Jules =

Vena Jules is an educator from Trinidad and Tobago. She was the new Senior Programme Executive for Curriculum Development at the Catholic Religious Education Development Institute (CREDI) (2009) Jules was appointed president of CREDI in July 2011. At the graduation ceremony in November 2013, Jules was awarded "the honour of being the first Fellow of CREDI". A CIDA scholar and graduate of Queen's University, Canada (BSc Hons. Geography and Master of Education), Jules obtained her Ph.D. at the University of the West Indies (UWI). She was a senior lecturer at the School of Education of the University of the West Indies, St. Augustine Campus, where she served from 1983 to 2008. In 2004, she was one of four lecturers who was awarded the Guardian Life of the Caribbean Premium Teacher Award for excellence in teaching at the University of the West Indies.

Her research focus was on students, their classroom experiences, their perceptions and teaching/learning strategies that empower students as learners and give them voice and agency in the classroom. She has published both independently and in teams including refereed journals, books and reports (UNDP, UNICEF, UNESCO). With Professor Peter Kutnick (University of London), she has researched and published works on the Trinidad and Tobago students' perceptions of a good teacher, with analyses and findings providing both longitudinal and gender perspectives.

Jules has been the representative for the University of the West Indies on the UNESCO Education for All in the Caribbean (EFA) Monograph series and was the researcher and co-writer of the EFA sub-regional report as well as the writer and editor of a number of monographs in the series. She was the EFA representative for the Americas at the UNESCO: Paris EFA International Consultative Forum in March 2000. Her findings under the EFA protocol were the stimuli for the adoption, throughout the Americas, of Early Childhood Care and Education policy and the implementation of a regulatory framework for provisions from birth to eight years of age.

Her other works include "Students' Experiences of Secondary Schooling in Trinidad and Tobago: The first three years" (1998); A study of the Secondary School Population in Trinidad and Tobago: Placement Patterns and Practices: A research report (1994); Gender and School Achievement in the Caribbean (with Peter Kutnick and Anthony Layne, 1997); A Situational Analysis of Children and Their Families in Trinidad and Tobago (with G. Pargass and J. Sharpe, UNICEF (World Bank) 1998); and The State of Education in the Caribbean in the 1990s: Sub-Regional Synthesis and Annexes (UNESCO, 2002).
