= Choc'late Allen =

Trinidad and Tobago activist

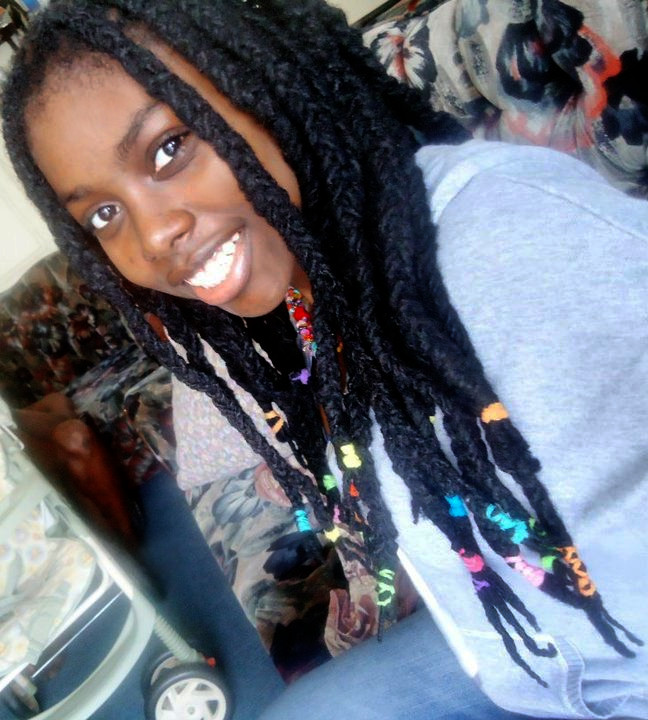
Choc'late Allen

Choc'late Allen (born 19 June 1993) is a Trinidad and Tobago activist and CEO of Caribbean Vizion (a nonprofit youth organization).

In early 2007 she engaged in a 5-day fast in an effort to promote the concept of taking personal responsibility for individual thoughts and actions and addressing social issues in Trinidad and Tobago. During her fast, she received visits from citizens and dignitaries, including the opposition leader Kamla Persad-Bissessar and Prime Minister Patrick Manning.

As part of her "100% Crime-Free" inititive, Allen conducted motivational school tours and other community projects focused on personal responsibility and violence prevention.

Allen also formed youth committees of young persons under the age of 17 who have the same goal of making a positive impact on youths and society; and who are interested in being effective, future leaders.

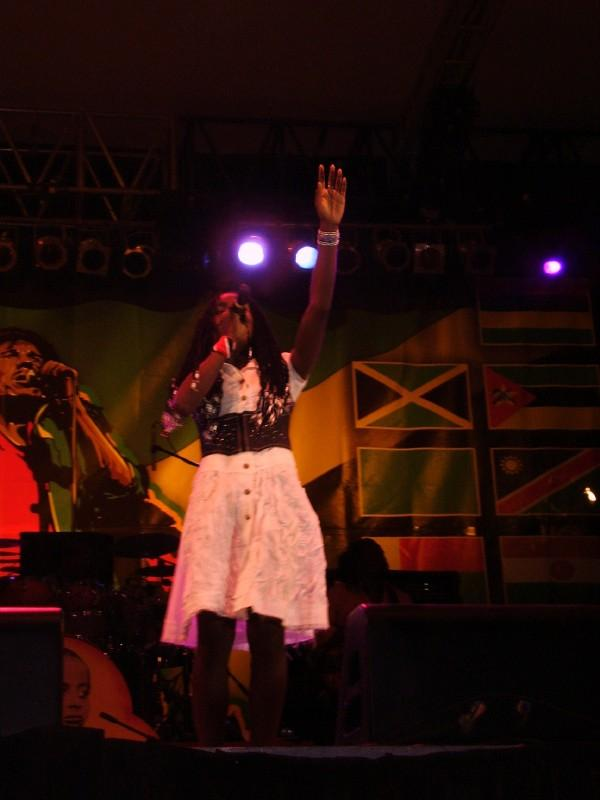
Choc'late performing at Bob Marley tribute concert - Jamaica

In 2008, Allen launched her singing career and 2008-initiative at the 15th annual Rebel Salute concert in Jamaica. Rebel Salute is a reggae concert held and formed by Tony Rebel and Flames Productions. The concert is one of no alcohol, no violence, no meat and no drugs. Following this event, Allen was invited by Rita Marley to be the co-chair of the Africa Unite Youth Symposium and to perform at the Africa Unite-Smile Jamaica concert. The concert featured the acts Bunny Wailer, John Legend, Rihanna, Ziggy Marley and the Melody Makers/ The Marley brothers and other local and international artists.

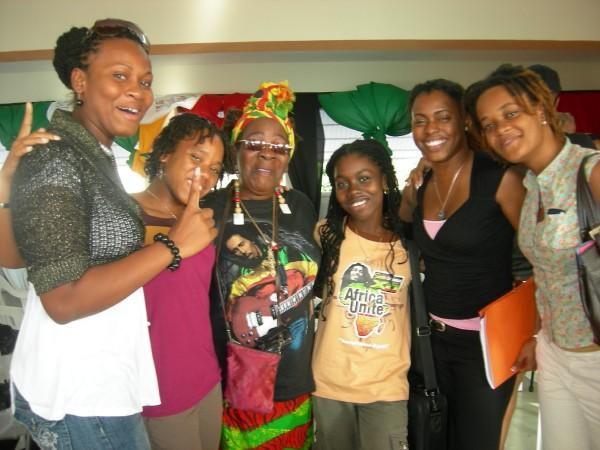
Choc'late and Rita Marley

Recently, in addition to the continuation of her Taking Personal Responsibility movement, as an activist, she has visited several schools in Jamaica; with the support of UN agencies and other organizations. As an artist, Choc'late collaborated with reggae artist Queen Ifrica in the song "Friends", which covers both a child and adult vision of friendship. The two performed the song at the first international night of the Reggae Summer Festival.

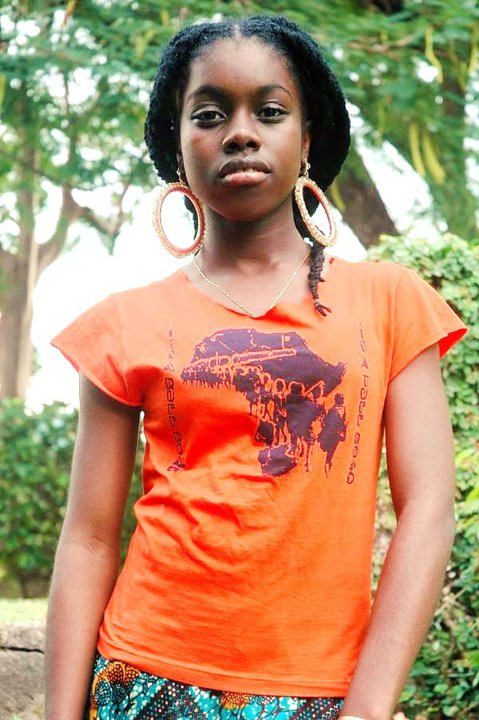
Choc'late Allen

== Early life ==
Allen is a home-schooled student, who as a toddler showed qualities of determination and enthusiasm towards learning. This led to her being a consistent A+ student and heavily involved in cultural, sporting and social activities. From 1993 to 2000, she lived in Trinidad and Tobago. In 2001, Allen began touring the region as an actress, singer and dancer with the organization Caribbean Vizion.

== Caribbean Vizion ==
In 2004, Caribbean Vizion lost its St. Lucian C.E.O – Ms. Jany Williams – to a vehicle accident that Allen and four other C.V cast members were involved in. After campaigning against a 34-year-old, Choc'late was elected CEO of the regional organization Caribbean Vizion. Tours took her to schools (elementary, primary, secondary, and tertiary institutions), prisons (adult and youth correctional facilities), communities, children homes and institutions for the hearing and visual impaired and for the physically challenged.

After touring with Caribbean Vizion from 2001 to 2006, Allen began putting structure to an independent movement, which would be presented through the channels of education and culture (Educulture), music, workshops, and social activism.

== Fast ==
In 2007, 13-year-old Allen began the year with a five-day fast at the National Library in Port of Spain, Trinidad. Inspired after reading the biography of Mahatma Gandhi, she did not consume food and drink for five days. During the fast, she urged the nation to take personal responsibility for their thoughts, words and actions; and work together toward positive nation building. Following her fast, she conducted motivational school tours, award ceremonies, summer camps, and formed youth groups that flew the TPR (taking personal responsibility) flag.

In 2009, Allen and her organization produced an audio disk entitled "Children Must be Seen and Heard". This disk was the result of Allen's "Creating a vision for our future" workshop; a tour of schools, communities and institutions in all 40 parishes in Jamaica. The tour was supported by UNESCO, UNAIDS, UNDP, UNICEF, and UNEP, and was executed over a period of two years. The audio disk was endorsed by the then Prime Minister, Mr. Bruce Golding and then Minister of Education, Dr. Andrew Holness, and was implemented as a training tool for teachers, guidance counselors, peer counselors, and students; in all schools on island.

From 2007 onward, Allen continued her work as a youth activist and motivational speaker, conducting school tours and social-awareness projects across several Caribbean countries. She also pursued music, performing at Rebel Salute in Jamaica in 2008 and receiving an offer to record with Tuff Gong International. In 2012, Allen announced plans to publish a book based on the life of a young woman.

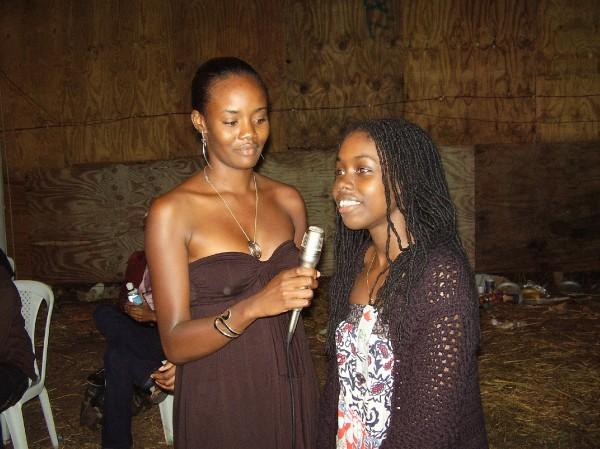
Choc'late being Interviewed

== Bibliography ==
- Agile Telecom Ltd. and Xidemia. "Trinidad and Tobago's Newsday : newsday.co.tt". newsday.co.tt. Archived from the original on 2 February 2014.
- https://web.archive.org/web/20120424194954/http://test.guardian.co.tt/index.php?q=commentary%2Fletters%2F2010%2F01%2F12%2Fchoc-late-allen-responds-letter
- Raffique Shah. "Trinicenter.com : One Choc'late with courage, please". trinicenter.com.
- https://web.archive.org/web/20120424173814/http://www.ttentonline.com/press-release/choclate-allen-co-chairs-for-the-4th-annual-africa-unite-
- http://www.trinidadandtobagonews.com/blog/?p=165
- "Choc'late's burden". landofsixpeoples.com.
- "Choc'late to unleash at Western Consciousness - YardFlex.com". yardflex.com.
- https://web.archive.org/web/20111218065357/http://www.go-localjamaica.com/readarticle.php?ArticleID=10759
- "The Jamaica National Commission for UNESCO :: Education". jncunesco.gov.jm. Archived from the original on 25 January 2014.
- Raymond Syms. "Choc'late - wisdom beyond her years". Catholic News.
- http://www.businesssolarpanels.org/choclate/
- "Entertainment News - IslandEvents.com - Choc'late Allen In Jamaica Fasting For Peace - May 16, 2007". islandevents.com. Archived from the original on 25 April 2012.
- https://archive.org/details/alchemystics2011-08-05.jz-bt201.flac16
- "Danah Alleyne to get youth award". islandmix.com.
