= Drupatee Ramgoonai =

Trinidad and Tobago musician

Drupatee Ramgoonai (pronounced [drʊpəti raːməɡʊɳaːjə]; born 2 March 1945) is a Trinidadian and Tobagonian chutney and chutney soca musician. She was responsible for coining the term "chutney soca" in 1987 with her first album, entitled Chutney Soca, which included both English and Hindustani versions of the songs. She had her biggest hit the following year when her "(Roll Up the Tassa) Mr. Bissessar" was a Road March contender. She was instrumental in tassa and chutney soca finding its place in Carnival and her efforts later led to competitions such as Chutney Soca Monarch.

== Biography ==
Drupatee Ramgoonai was born on Sunrees Road in Charlo Village, Penal, Saint Patrick County, (present-day region of Penal-Debe), Trinidad and Tobago, on 2 March 1958 into a Hindu Indian family. She started singing alongside her mother in the mandir at a young age, then went on to learn Indian classical singing from her trainer Ustad James Ramsewak, a veteran in the field. She also gained exposure on Mastana Bahar, the Indian Cultural Pageant, winning the local song category in 1983 and 1984.

Ramgoonai recorded her first crossover tune in 1987, entitled "Chutney Soca", and gained moderate success in the calypso tents. The term chutney soca was first coined by Drupatee Ramgoonai with that crossover tune "Chutney Soca" in 1987 and Ramgoonai is considered the mother of chutney soca. The following year, she released "Mr Bissessar (Roll Up de Tassa)". She has also released songs such as "Pepper", "Hotter Than a Chulha", "Careless Driver", "Motilal", "Tassawalley", and "Manzalina" and "Wuk Up D Ladki" with Machel Montano.

She created history as being the first woman of Indian descent to sing calypso and soca and has been one of the main targets of those who are scandalised by women and Indians singing chutney, chutney soca, calypso, and soca.

In 2016 Drupatee signed an exclusive digital distribution agreement with Fox Fuse, making her entire music catalog available digitally worldwide for the first time. In 2025 she was awarded the Hummingbird Medal Gold, by the Government of Trinidad and Tobago.

== Collaborations ==
- "Indian Gyal" – Drupatee and Machel Montano
- "Real Unity" – Drupatee and Machel Montano
- "Nani Wine Remix" – Drupatee and Crazy
- "Curry Tabanca" – Drupatee and Mighty Trini
- "Roll Up De Tassa" – Drupatee, ft. Alison Hinds
- "Be Mines Tonight" – Drupatee and Blazer
- "Jep Sting Naina" – Drupatee, ft. Hunter (Lalchan Babwa), D'Hitman (Neeshan Prabhoo), Ravi Bissambhar, Anil Bheem, and Andy Singh
- "Nazron Se Kehdo" - Drupatee and Satnarine Ragoo
- "Mujko Thand" -Drupatee and D'Hitman (Neeshan Prabhoo)
