= Sylvia Kacal =

British-Trinidadian conservationist

- Born: Anne Sylvia Greenwood; April 1939; Yorkshire, UK
- Died: 24 October 2003 (aged 64) between Mulanje and Blantyre, Malawi
- Occupation(s): conservationist, teacher
- Spouse: Vlad Kacal (m. 1963-1977)

Anne Sylvia Kacal (née Greenwood; April 1939 – 24 October 2003) was a British-Trinidadian conservationist, teacher, and art patron. She was the founding president of the Caribbean Forest Conservation Association (CFCA), and helped to found many local environmental action groups. She was also involved with the Trinidad and Tobago Field Naturalists' Club.

== Early life ==
Anne Sylvia Greenwood was born in April 1939 in Yorkshire, England. She graduated from the University of London with a BA in modern languages. After working briefly as a teacher, she also completed a teaching diploma at the University of Bristol.

Greenwood was a girl guide, and became the president of Bristol Guides Club. Through contact with the scouts, she met Vlad Kacal. The two married in 1963; they moved to Trinidad and Tobago (T&T) the following year to join Vlad's family.

== Career ==
To help fellow expatriate women, Kacal founded the British Women’s Club in 1966. She also worked in the family business, Kacal's Woodworking. She ran an art gallery in the Hilton Shopping Arcade and gained a reputation for supporting new artists; together with William Gordon, Kacal organised Shastri Maharaj's first solo exhibition in 1982. Although the gallery closed in the mid-1980s due to declining economy, she remained a member of the Art Society of Trinidad and Tobago and continued to organize exhibitions, including a National Museum exhibition on primitive art. Kacal regularly participated in the Trinidad Carnival festivities, especially J'ouvert.

Kacal and her husband had two sons and one daughter. The couple divorced in 1977, but she decided to stay in Trinidad and kept her married name. She began working as a teacher at St Andrew’s School.

Kacal first joined the Trinidad and Tobago Field Naturalists' Club to take her daughter for the Club's field trips. As she became more involved with the club's work in studying local plants and animals, Kacal became interested in conservation as well. She served on the governmental committee for wetlands. She also organised the "Day of 1,000 Trees". She protested against environmentally-unsound practices of local miners, and set up educational programs against forest burning. In 1988, Kacal, Eden Shand, and other conservationists founded the Caribbean Forest Conservation Association (CFCA); Kacal served as its first president for four years. Kacal helped set up local nature conservation organisations, and founded the Council of Presidents of the Environment (COPE) for better coordination among these organisations. She wrote a weekly "Environment" column for the Trinidad and Tobago Guardian to increase public awareness of environmental issues.

In 1995, Kacal retired from teaching and began a Master's degree in environmental resource management at the University of the West Indies at Cave Hill in Barbados. After graduating, Kacal returned to Trinidad to work full-time on environmental projects, and co-drafted the Wildlife Conservation Bill. She remained active with the CFCA: when the World Bank contracted the CFCA to develop a National Parks and Protected Areas plan for the country, Kacal played a prominent role in the process. She then received World Bank assignments to advise environmental organisations in Vietnam and Sri Lanka. These assignments helped Kacal bid for consulting contracts with ecotourism and conservation projects first in Tanzania, then (after 1999) in Malawi. She would take a 6-9 month contract, visit Trinidad for 1-2 months, then return to bid on another contract. Her last contract was with Mulanje Mountain Conservation Trust in Malawi.

== Death ==
In Malawi, Kacal was diagnosed with malaria on 20 October 2003. She died on 24 October while being transferred from the mission hospital in Mulanje to Blantyre. The T&T Field Naturalists' Club and the CFCA commissioned a memorial plaque for her; it is installed in the Garden of Peace at the Holy Trinity Cathedral, Port of Spain.

Kacal was a contributor to the Dictionary of the English/Creole of Trinidad & Tobago (2009).

== Partial bibliography ==
=== Books ===
- Sculpture: 1980-86 = Escultura (with Luise Kimme, 1985)
- Albert Prince: Sculpture 1979-86 (with Luise Kimme, 1986)

=== Articles ===
- "Nesting Stilts" in Naturalist, vol.6, No.11, Nov.-Dec., 1986, p.27.
- "Stabroek Market" in Caribbean Beat (May-Jun. 1996), p. 27.
- "Weaning Cushe Away From Ganja" in Trinidad Guardian (12 May 1997), p. 25.

=== Other ===
- "Developing Strategies for Community Involvement in Protecting Fragile Areas" presented at the XVII International Congress of the Latin American Studies Association (1992)
- Drains and You: A Manual for Drainage Maintenance Workers (PAHO, 2000)
