= Michelle Borel =

Trinidad and Tobago radio personality

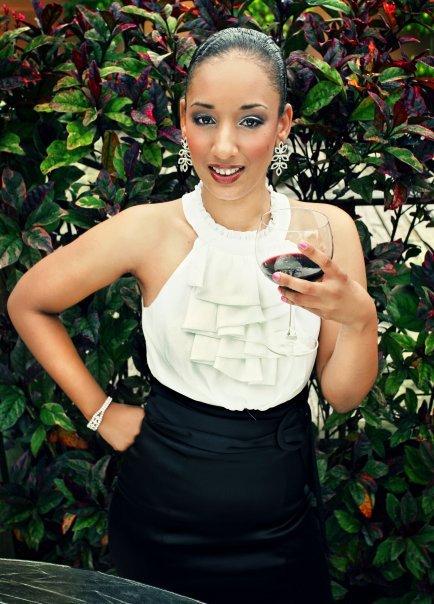
- Born: 13 April 1983 (age 43); Trinidad and Tobago
- Presenting career
- Show: The Morning Show
- Station: www.1077musicforlife.com
- Network: Trinidad & Tobago Radio Network
- Time slot: 5:00 – 9:00am
- Country: Trinidad & Tobago

Michelle Borel (born 13 April 1983 in Trinidad and Tobago) is a radio personality, television host, producer, baker, marketer and author. Her voiceover work has been used to launch a local nightclub The Living Room, and other brands and events including Temple of INK, Digicel, Unit Trust, Pizza Hut, Francis Fashions/Shoe Locker, Seacrets and The Auto Guru.

From 1998 Borel also performed as a 'sound gyal' with Rapid Response sound system, later leaving to form the first all-female sound system in Trinidad and Tobago, Zephers, followed by a solo career. She is one of the most recognised female voice artists in the country and across the Caribbean, as the voice ID of several radio stations and DJs.

== Life and career ==
Borel started her schooling at Dunross Preparatory, Westmoorings. In 1995, she moved on to St. Francois Girls College, Belmont, after what was previously known as Common Entrance. At St. Francois she participated in various school clubs including drama, chess, and language. A teacher at the school who was impressed by Borel's voice on a demo cassette suggested that she host an upcoming school event, and she subsequently started hosting all school events.

Borel started her broadcasting career at 96.1wefm in 1998, gaining further experience at HOTT 93 and Heartbeat 103.5 (radio for women), before returning to her home network, Trinidad and Tobago Radio Network- 96.1wefm and 107.7fm - Music for Life.

In 2004, she produced and hosted a competition titled Lipsync Fever, which aired on a local station, ieTV. She also produced and hosted Triple F – Fashion and food with friends, which aired on CNC3.

== Personal life ==
Borel married in 2004 and has four children. She was previously the Regional Brand Manager of TGI Friday's Caribbean. She also founded Cookie Castle Trinidad.

Borel writes poetry, and has been published in two international poetry publications, The International Who’s Who of Poetry in 2012 and The Book of Laughter and Forgetting. In 2016 she published a poetry book entitled, Soulspection, a collection of poetry for which she won a NGC Bocas Lit Fest/Newsday's People's Choice T&T Book of the Year award.

She currently has two children's books 'Magic Words with Max' and 'Now I'm Two.'
