= Naomi Chin Wing =

Trinidadian fashion model (born 2000)

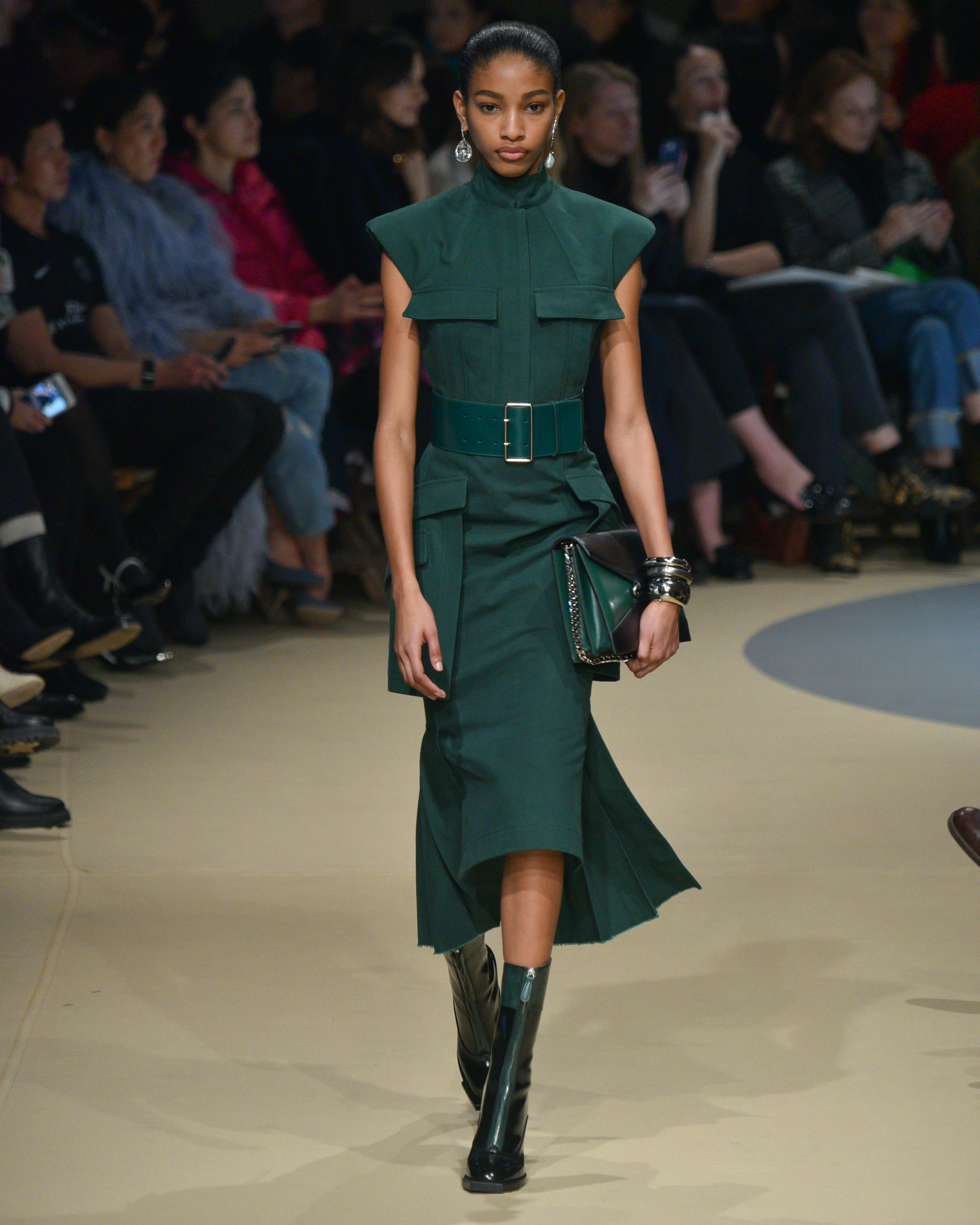
- Chin Wing in 2018
- Born: January 2000 (age 25); Port of Spain, Trinidad and Tobago
- Modeling information
- Height: 1.80 m (5 ft 11 in)
- Hair color: Brown
- Eye color: Brown
- Agency: Elite Model Management (New York); Select Model Management (Paris); Monster Management (Milan); M + P Models (London); 28 Models Trinbago (New York) (mother agency)

Naomi Chin Wing (born January 2000) is a Trinidadian fashion model.

== Career ==
On her 16th birthday, Chin Wing was signed to IMG Models in London, after winning a local modeling competition, as well as signing with Elite Model Management's Latin and South America division. She debuted as an exclusive for Yves Saint Laurent in 2018 during Paris Fashion Week, also walking for designers like Alexander McQueen, Givenchy, Valentino, Dior, John Galliano, Giambattista Valli, Jean Paul Gaultier, Off-White, and Altuzarra and appearing in British Vogue and i-D. After walking for Alexander Wang, Coach New York, Calvin Klein, Marc Jacobs, 3.1 Philip Lim among others, she was chosen as a "top newcomer" by models.com. Chin Wing appeared in a Miu Miu campaign alongside models like Kendall Jenner, Ariel Nicholson, Adriana Lima, and Taylor Hill. She has also appeared in campaigns for Roberto Cavalli, Ralph Lauren, Zara, and Versace.
