= Ravi B =

Trinidadian chutney musician

- Also known as: Ravi B
- Born: Ravi Bissambhar; 27 October 1982 (age 43)
- Origin: Sangre Grande, Trinidad and Tobago
- Genres: Chutney Soca and Chutney
- Occupations: Musician, producer, Vocalist
- Instruments: Vocals
- Member of: KARMA
- Website: www.karmatt.com

Ravi Bissambhar, also known as Ravi B, (pronounced [rəvi bisəⁿbʰərə]; born 27 October 1982) is a Trinidadian chutney soca musician.

== Personal life ==
Ravi Bissambhar was born in Sangre Grande.

== Karma ==
Bissambhar is the lead male vocalist, music director, producer, and arranger for the Caribbean-fused band Karma.

== Reception ==
Karma was awarded the Best Chutney Soca band of the year, Best Male Chutney Soca Artiste and Chutney Song of the year at the 2015 International Soca Awards in New York City.

In 2024, Eastern Eye called him the "king of chutney".

Ravi B also placed first in the Chutneymusic.com Top 10 and Top 100 several times.

== Albums and hit songs ==
- Evolution (2002)
- Another Bad Creation (2003)
- Secret 48 (2004)
- Karma Mangalam (Bhajan CD) (2005)
- Karma Sutra (2005)
- Destiny 1 (2005)

Badi Door

- Destiny 2 (2006)

Rum is Meh Lover

- Destiny 3 (2007)

Gul Gul
Wine On Meh
Ta La La La

- Karma Sutra 2.0 (2008)

Barahee
Bison
Parbatee

- Karmageddon (2009)

Jep Sting Naina
Tell Where Yuh From
Tek Meh Gyul
Dularie Nanny

- Secret 69 (2013)

Gyal Wukkin
Prescription
Wine Up Your Body
Keep Working – Gregory Ayuen
Choli Ke Peeche – Nisha B & Ravi B
Karma Slam 4 – Ravi B
Jiya Re – Nilli B & Nisha B
Karma Heer – Nisha B & Ravi B
Sanam Teri Kasam – Ravi B & Anil Bheem
Friends With Benefits – Ravi B & Konshens
Gul Doh Bother Me – Ravi B
Bacchanal – Omadath Maharaj & Ravi B
Gul Doh Bother Me – Ravi B
Lawa – Ravi B & Iwer George
Sindoor Lagawe – Nisha B
Tassa – Gregory Ayuen
License To Wine – Ravi B
Budget - Ravi B (2017)
Start Over - Ravi B (2018)
Gunga Ghana - Dubraj Persad & Ravi B (2019)
Headshot - Ravi B (2019)
Deal With Dat - Ravi B (2020)

== Collaborations ==
- "Jep Sting Naina"
- "Bhaigan & Aloo" – Lalchan Babwa(Hunter), Ravi Bissambhar, Anil Bheem, Neeshan Prabhoo, Drupatee Ramgoonai, Andy Singh
- "Tek Me Gyal" – Ravi Bissambhar, ft Neeshan Prabhoo
- "De Hammer" – Ravi Bissambhar ft. S.W. Storm
- "Ah Drinka" – Ravi Bissambhar & Johnny Fontainne
- "Vanni" – Ravi Bissambhar & Shiva Lakhan
- "Player" – Ravi Bissamber
- "Cya Cum" – Ravi Bissambhar
- "Sumatee" – Ravi Bissambhar & Terry Gajraj
- "Ah Rose" – Ravi Bisshambhar
- "Single" – Ravi Bissambhar & Rick Ramoutar
- "She Horning Meh" – Ravi Bissambhar
- "Doh Wah Me Go" – Ravi Bissambhar
- "De Limer, Drinka & Barman" – Ravi Bissambhar, Dollyboy & Rikki Jai
- "Lawa" – Ravi Bissambhar & Iwer George
- "Doh Go Away" – Ravi Bissambhar & Rick Ramoutar
- "Prescription" – Ravi Bissambhar
- "Bacchanal" – Ravi Bissambhar & Omardath Maharaj
- "Friends With Benefits" – Ravi Bissambhar & Konshens
- "All Out Of Rum" – Ravi Bissambhar, Hunter, Rikki Jai & Soca Elvis
- "Gyal Wukkin" – Ravi Bissambhar
