= Lovey's String Band =

Band from Trinidad

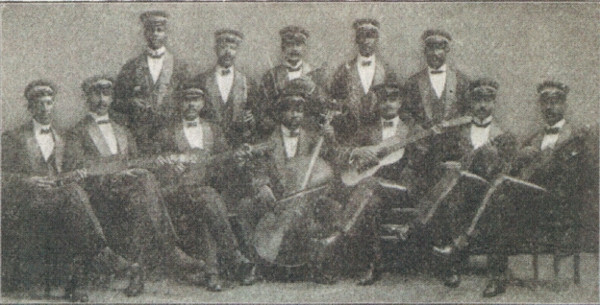

Lovey's String Band were a Trinidadian musical group. They are known primarily for having been the earliest known calypso group to have recorded. They originally formed sometime in the 1890s and continued performing until the early 1920s.

== Recordings ==
The band did a recording session in New York City in 1912, five years before the first jazz recordings, and these instrumental recordings document a style of "hot" music in fashion in the Caribbean around that time. The recording was selected for preservation in 2002 by the National Recording Preservation Board of the Library of Congress.

Trinidad Paseo

Their first recording was the song "Mango Vert" for Columbia Records and a week later they switched stables to record with Victor Records. Other songs in their catalogue include "Trinidad Paseo", "Petrol and Sara", "Mari-Juana", and "Manuelito".
