= Emraan Ali and Jihad Ali =

American citizen father and son who joined ISIL

Emraan Ali
- Born: July 4, 1967 (age 59); Trinidad and Tobago
- Other name: Abu-Jihad al-Trinidad al-Amriki
- Citizenship: USA
- Known for: Westerner who joined the Islamic State
- Children: 5 (2 deceased)
- Criminal charges: conspiring to provide material support to a designated foreign terrorist organization
- Penalty: 20 years in prison

Jihad Muhammad Ali
- Born: November 30, 2000 (age 25); North Hempstead, New York, USA
- Other names: Abu Dujanah al-Amriki, Abu Dujanah al-Hindi
- Citizenship: USA
- Known for: Westerner who joined the Islamic State
- Criminal charges: conspiring to provide material support to a designated foreign terrorist organization
- Penalty: 5 years in prison

Emraan Ali (born July 4, 1967) and Jihad Muhammad Ali (born November 30, 2000) are an American father and son who traveled to Syria with their family in March 2015 to join the Islamic State of Iraq and the Levant. Emraan's wife's sister and her family also joined ISIL. Both Emraan and Jihad surrendered in 2019 and were repatriated to the United States in 2020 and charged with material support violations related to their ISIL membership. Emraan pleaded guilty to conspiring to provide material support to a designated foreign terrorist organization and was sentenced to 20 years in federal prison. Jihad was found guilty of the same charge and sentenced to five years in prison.

Emraan and Jihad were members of a large extended family, fifteen of whom joined ISIL. In 2023, Emraan's father-in-law, Nazim Mohammed, said he had not received word from most of his relatives since their departure for Syria and feared many of them were dead. The disappearance of so many of Nazim's family members, including Emraan and Jihad, into the Islamic State is also discussed in Simon Cottee's book Black Flags of the Caribbean: How Trinidad Became an ISIS Hotspot.

== Life before ISIL ==
Emraan was born in Trinidad and Tobago on July 4, 1967, and moved to New York in the United States on January 9, 1991. He was naturalized as an American citizen in 2007. In around 2008, he moved back to Trinidad and Tobago. He was married to Sulaimah Abdul Aziz Mohammed.

Sulaimah's father, Nazim Mohammed, was a former member of Jamaat-al-Muslimeen, an Islamist organization which did a coup attempt in 1990. He is an imam who owned and ran the Boos Settlement Muslim community, which had thirty houses and a mosque in Rio Claro, Trinidad and Tobago. The majority of Trinidadians who joined ISIL lived on or near the Boos Settlement. Emraan and Sulaimah had five children together, and one stepchild. Emraan’s son Jihad was born in North Hempstead, New York on November 30, 2000. Sulaimah is not his mother.

In December 2014, Emraan found out his wife's sister, her husband, and their three adult daughters had all traveled to Syria. They sent Emraan photographs and videos of their lives in the Islamic State. Emraan began listening to lectures by jihadist cleric Anwar al-Awlaki around this time. By early 2015, he later said, he had decided to join ISIL in order that his children would grow up in an Islamic environment.

== In the Islamic State ==
On March 20, 2015, Emraan took his family from Trinidad and Tobago to Brazil, and from there to Turkey. He told his children they were taking a vacation. Before they left Trinidad and Tobago, he collected $15,000 in cash and melted down gold. The family traveled to Gaziantep near the Syrian border, and Emraan got in touch with contacts to arrange for their travel across the border into ISIL territory. Just before they crossed the border into Syria, he asked each member of the family if they wanted to join ISIL, and they said they did. The family first settled in Manbij. They later moved to Raqqa.

Between July and November 2015, Emraan and Jihad both got military and religious training in Raqqa, ISIL's Syrian capital. Emraan took the nom de guerre Abu-Jihad al-Trinidad al-Amriki. Jihad's nom de guerre was Abu Dujanah al-Amriki, but he also used the name Abu Dujanah al-Hindi. Both had the designation "TNT" applied to their names, for Trinidad and Tobago. Both father and son were assigned to the same battalion, the Anwar al-Awlaki battalion. During his first and only raid, Emraan complained of heart problems, and was discharged from military service for medical reasons. Thereafter he worked in residential construction. He also made money buying and selling livestock, cars, phones, weapons and weapons accessories, and as a hawla broker for other Trinidadian ISIL fighters.

Sometime in 2016, Sulaimah gave birth to twins, but one of the twins subsequently died. In November that year, Emraan arranged the marriage of his 14-year-old daughter to a 21-year-old British ISIL fighter. She had a son when she was 15.

In May 2017, Nazim Mohammed appeared in an Al Jazeera documentary about Trinidadian ISIL fighters, Caribbean to Caliphate - People & Power. Nazim said fifteen of his relatives had traveled to Syria to join ISIL. His mosque had also come to the attention of several international police agencies, since at least one dead Trinidadian ISIL fighter had attended it. Nazim said he'd asked that person to leave the mosque after he displayed "disobedient" behavior unbecoming of a Muslim. He denied being an ISIL recruiter or propagandist or having any foreknowledge of his relatives’ plans to join ISIL, saying, "My daughter went there. I never knew that. Until a week after she rang and she told me she was in so and so place."

Simon Cottee discusses the Boos Settlement, Nazim Mohammed, and the disappearance of so many of Nazim's family members, including Emraan and Jihad Ali, in his book Black Flags of the Caribbean: How Trinidad Became an ISIS Hotspot. In December 2024, Nazim gave an interview with the Trinidad and Tobago Guardian and urged the government should facilitate the return of its minor child citizens from ISIL territory, saying minors brought to the caliphate by their parents shouldn't have to pay the price of their parents’ choices.

In late 2017, when the Syrian Democratic Forces retook Raqqa, the Ali family moved. They had to move again several more times as the Islamic State lost territory. In Hajin, Emraan was tasked by ISIL with constructing a community well. Jihad continued to serve in the Anwar al-Awlaki battalion. He kept in touch with his biological mother, who was back in Trinidad, over WhatsApp and described participating in battles with his thirteen-year-old brother. He fought in several places but later told the Federal Bureau of Investigation he had never killed anyone.

In September 2018, the US Treasury Department designated Emraan Ali as one of two terrorist financiers working on behalf of Caribbean ISIL fighters. His father-in-law in Trinidad spoke to the press at that time and said he hadn't heard from Emraan since the family left for Syria years earlier.

In March 2019, during ISIL's final territorial stand at the Battle of Baghuz Fawqani, Emraan urged other Trinidadian ISIL members not to surrender. He said he hoped the coalition forces would allow them to simply relocate.

== Return to the United States and criminal charges ==
On March 17, 2019, Emraan, his son Jihad and Jihad's younger brother all surrendered near Baghuz. Emraan and Jihad were the last known suspected terrorists in SDF custody to get repatriated to the United States, in September 2020, to face criminal charges. In March 2023, Emraan Ali pleaded guilty to conspiring to provide material support to a designated foreign terrorist organization. He was sentenced to 20 years in prison. Jihad Ali was sentenced to five years in prison.

== See also ==
- Khaled Sharrouf
- Lirim Sylejmani
- Cubs of the Caliphate
- Gailon Su and Su-lay Su
