= The Church of the Nazarene in Trinidad and Tobago =

The Church of the Nazarene in Trinidad and Tobago is a part of the international Church of the Nazarene.

== History ==
The Christian denomination entered Trinidad and Tobago in 1926 by sending USA missionary couple James and Nora Hill and Barbados missionary Carlotta Urchilla Graham. Their labor culminated in the incorporation of the Church of the Nazarene in Trinidad and Tobago by Act of Parliament in 1974. The story of the growth of the Church of the Nazarene in Trinidad and Tobago is recorded in the book, A History of the Church of the Nazarene in Trinidad and Tobago by Dr. Gelien Matthews. In 2013, the Church of the Nazarene in Trinidad and Tobago has approximately 4,000 members in 31 congregations, and is part of the Mesoamerica Region of the International Church of the Nazarene.

The growth of the Church of the Nazarene in Trinidad and Tobago has also been tied to the establishment of a Nazarene College (NTC then CNTC and now CNC) in Trinidad. This story has been vividly captured in the book, Triumph in Trinidad-God's Promises never failed by USA missionary Dr. Ruth O. Saxon, who served as Professor, Academic Dean, and President in her forty-three years at the College, and as a Supply Pastor to a number of Local churches.

The Church of the Nazarene in Trinidad and Tobago is led by the ministry of the District Superintendent. In the early years the church was led by American District Superintendents Raymond Miller (1949–55), Prescott Beals (1955-57), Wesley Harmon (1958–63), and William Fowler (1963–71). The first Local District Superintendent was Hugh Mc Kenzie (1971–75). He was followed by nationals Farrell Chapman (1975–83), Carl Bompart (1983-86), Clifford Manswell (1986-2006).

The Church of the Nazarene in Trinidad and Tobago is currently led by District Superintendent, the Rev. Dr. Victor Everton George, who assumed this ministry in 2006.
