= Eden Shand =

Trinidad and Tobago environmentalist and politician (1939–2021)

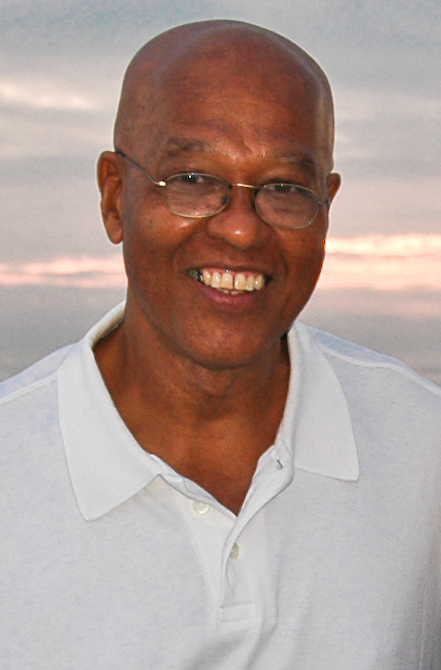
- Shand in 2007

Member of Parliament
- In office 12 January 1987 – 19 November 1991
- Prime Minister: A. N. R. Robinson
- Constituency: St. Ann's West

Personal details
- Born: Eden Arthur Shand; 14 September 1939 Trinidad and Tobago
- Died: 20 January 2021 (aged 81) Port of Spain, Trinidad and Tobago
- Party: National Alliance for Reconstruction (NAR)
- Education: University of Aberdeen; University of British Columbia

Eden Arthur Shand (14 September 1939 – 20 January 2021) was a Trinidadian environmentalist and politician. He worked toward establishing environmental standards in Trinidad and Tobago.

Shand served as an MP for St. Ann's West (1987–1991) under the National Alliance for Reconstruction. He was a Parliamentary Secretary in the Ministry of Food Production, Marine Exploitation, Forestry and the Environment (1987–1988) and the Minister of External Affairs and International Trade (1988–1991).

== Early life ==
Shand was born on 14 September 1939 in Williamsville, Trinidad. He attended St. Mary's College in his high school years and received a BSc (Hons) in Forestry from the University of Aberdeen in 1963. He received an MBA from the University of British Columbia in 1968.

Shand worked in the Trinidadian government Division of Forestry from 1963 to 1965. After finishing his MBA, he worked as a forest economist in Vancouver from 1968 to 1972, then returned to Trinidad. In 1979, Shand was one of the founding members of Citizens For Conservation.

In the 1980s, Shand hosted a youth-focused talk show called Feedback on Trinidad and Tobago Television.

== Politics ==
In 1986, Shand won the St. Ann's West seat in the House of Representatives as a candidate of the National Alliance for Reconstruction (NAR) party, defeating the incumbent candidate of the People's National Movement (PNM). The newly-founded NAR became the first opposition party to win a national parliamentary election since independence in 1962.

Shand was sworn in on 12 January 1987. He was initially appointed a Parliamentary Secretary in the Ministry of Food Production, Marine Exploitation, Forestry and the Environment. However, he was removed from this portfolio in 1988 after proposing restrictions on deliberate forest burning. He then became the Minister of External Affairs and International Trade. Together with Sylvia Kacal and other conservationists, he founded the Caribbean Forest Conservation Association (CFCA) in 1988.

Shand was one of the MPs held hostage during the Jamaat al Muslimeen coup attempt in 1990.

St. Ann's West was merged with Port of Spain North for the 1991 elections. Shand did not stand for reelection.

== Later activism ==
After leaving Parliament, Shand gained certification as an Associate Environmental Auditor from the Environmental Auditors Registration Association (UK). He set up a consultancy, Environmental Management and Planning Associates Limited. Shand also became the chairman of the Caribbean Forest Conservation Association; during his tenure, the organisation began setting up conservation parks.

Shand campaigned against projects to build over the Queen's Park Savannah. During a 1999 sit-in, builders attempting to pave over a section of the park dumped a truckload of gravel on Shand. He was excavated alive, but had lasting injuries. He opposed a 2006 government proposal to build a stadium at the park, and exposed other cases where construction projects had been approved without securing environmental assessments.

Shand wrote articles in the Trinidad Express and the Trinidad Guardian where he critiqued the governance structure of the state Environment Management Agency. He was chairman of Trinidad and Tobago's Earth Charter National Committee.

== Personal life ==
Shand had five children. His two younger children were from his marriage to Mary Schorse, an American social scientist. Shand and Schorse co-founded the Tropical Re-Leaf Foundation.

=== Death ===
Shand died on 20 January 2021 at the age of 81 after a long illness. The House of Representatives paid tribute to Shand at the beginning of the 27 January session.

== Electoral history ==
1986 Trinidad and Tobago general election: St. Ann's West
Party	Candidate	Votes	%	±%
NAR	Eden Shand	6,305		
PNM	John Stanley Donaldson	6,196		
NJAC	Anum Bankole	452		
PPM	Solange Bailey	68		
Total valid votes		13,021		
Rejected ballots		68		
Turnout		13,089		
Registered electors		24,339		
NAR gain from PNM		Swing		

== Partial bibliography ==
=== Books ===
- The Development of the Japanese Market for Pacific Northwest Lumber (1968, thesis)
- The Estates Within: A Docu-Drama (1992)

=== Articles ===
- "Global Warming and the Caribbean" in Caribbean Beat (1992)
- "Rehabilitating Our Forests" (2009)
