= Roger Gaspard =

- Born: April 27, 1902
- Died: August 14, 1982 (aged 80)
- Education: École polytechnique École supérieure d'électricité
- Occupations: Businessman, engineer
- Known for: Chair of Électricité de France (1962–1964), French Resistance

Roger Gaspard (April 27, 1902 – August 14, 1982) was a French engineer and member of the French Resistance.

== Biography ==
The son of a colonial artillery officer, Roger Gaspard was a student at the École Polytechnique, the École Nationale des Ponts et Chaussées, and the École supérieure d'électricité. He was an engineer and then Chief engineer of the Department of Roads and Bridges of Seine from 1927 to 1942. Gaspard was also Chief of Staff of Paul Ramadier, Secretary of State for Public Works between June 1936 and January 1938, and then Director of Electricity at the Ministry of Industrial Production. Gaspard represented the government at the Committee for the Organization of Electric Power between 1942 and 1946.

A member of the French Resistance, Gaspard was arrested and imprisoned for hiding copper from the German authorities.

After the liberation of France and the nationalization of the electricity sector, Gaspard began a career at Électricité de France (EDF) and became a deputy director general in 1946, director general from 1947 to 1962, and then chairman from 1962 to 1964. At the same time, he was vice-chair of the Compagnie nationale du Rhône from 1946 to 1962 and Chair of Schneider Electric from 1966 to 1969.

Gaspard was Chair of the Ligue nationale contre le cancer – National League Against Cancer from 1971 to 1981.

== Sources ==
- René Gaudy (1978). Et la lumière fut nationalisée – Naissance d'EDF-GDF. Éditions Sociales. ISBN 978-2209052974.
- Henri Morsel (1996). Histoire de l'électricité en France. Vol. 3. Fayard. ISBN 978-2213029122.
