= Jo-Anne Sewlal =

Trinidad and Tobago arachnologist (1979–2020)

- Born: Jo-Anne Nina Sewlal; 29 March 1979; Point Fortin, Trinidad and Tobago
- Died: 20 January 2020 (aged 40); Port of Spain, Trinidad and Tobago
- Education: University of the West Indies at St. Augustine
- Occupation: arachnologist

Jo-Anne Nina Sewlal (29 March 1979 - 20 January 2020) was a Trinidad and Tobago arachnologist. She discovered several new species of spiders in Trinidad and Tobago, and published some of the first surveys of spider populations in many countries of the Caribbean.

== Biography ==
Jo-Anne Nina Sewlal was born in Point Fortin on 29 March 1979. In 1999, she began her Bachelor of Science in Zoology at the University of the West Indies at St. Augustine. She completed her MPhil in Entomology from the same university in 2005, and continued on to a PhD in Arachnology. As a PhD student, Sewlal won a research award from the Royal Entomological Society (2008), an International Darwin Scholarship (2009) from the Field Studies Council, and a NIHERST 2012 Award for Excellence in Science and Technology (Junior Scientist category). She was invited by the Smithsonian Institution in 2008 to identify its collection of spiders from Tobago.

She completed her PhD under the advice of Adrian Hailey in 2013. After graduation, Sewlal became a lecturer at UWI St. Augustine. In her field work, she surveyed spider populations in Anguilla, Montserrat, St. Kitts and Nevis, Grenada, Antigua and St. Lucia; for several countries, this was the first arachnid survey. Her work was also featured on the Science Channel.

Sewlal was involved with the NGO Environment Tobago, and wrote columns for it in the Tobago News. She was also an active member of the Trinidad and Tobago Field Naturalists' Club (TTFNC). She led the searches for new spider species in the TTFNC's annual BioBlitz. As a lecturer, she cofounded the Point Fortin Chess Centre to introduce the game to schoolchildren. She served as the Secretary of the Trinidad and Tobago chapter for the Caribbean Academy of Sciences at the time of her death.

Sewlal died of an allergic reaction at the Port of Spain General Hospital on 20 January 2020.
