= Sintra Bronte =

Trinidadian model and entrepreneur

- Born: Sintra Bronte; Trinidad
- Occupations: Model, Entrepreneur
- Years active: 1972–present
- Known for: Iconic 1972 Jamaica Tourist Board promotional poster

Sintra Bronte is a female Trinidadian model and entrepreneur. She is best known for her 1972 appearance in a promotional poster for the Jamaican Tourist Board. In the poster she is photographed wearing a wet orange T-shirt, with the word "Jamaica" printed on it in bold black lettering, clinging to her body. The Jamaican Tourist Board commissioned an American advertising company, Doyle Dane Bernbach, to do the poster campaign. The art director from Doyle Dane Bernbach was Mel Sant. Sintra had to stand outside the Jamaica Pegasus Hotel, now known as Le Meridien Jamaica Pegasus for seven hours during the poster shoot campaign.

== Fame ==
Named after her was a race course and a wrist watch, the "Sintra" by the Swiss Company Rado.

== Career in Destination Management ==
Today Sintra owns a destination management company called, A.J.M. Tours in her homeland of Trinidad.
