= Gokool =

Haji Gokool Meah
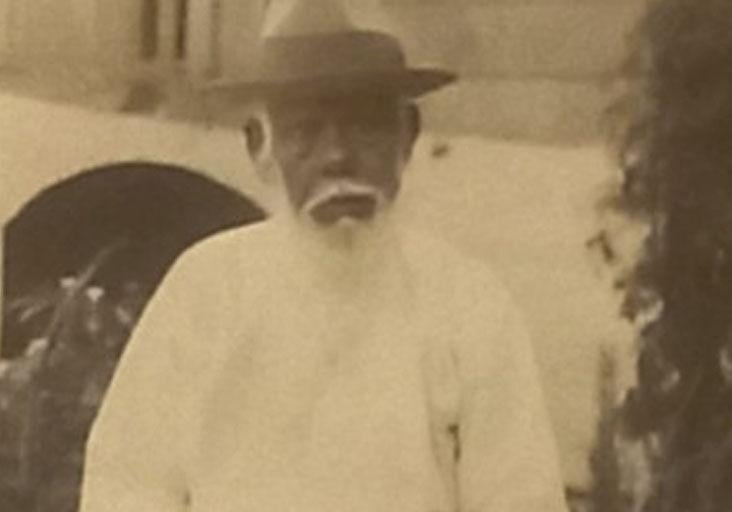
- Born: 1847; Kashmir
- Died: 1939 (aged 91–92)

Haji Gokool Meah (1847–1939) was an Indo-Trinidadian and Tobagonian industrialist and philanthropist. He was born into a Kashmiri Muslim family to Caulloo and Puddoo in the Vale of Kashmir, within the princely state of Jammu and Kashmir in British India. He was originally named Modhoo. His father died shortly before his birth and his mother remarried.

As a small child, his family left Kashmir and ended up in Calcutta, Bengal where in 1852 they signed up as indentured Indian labourers bound for the sugarcane fields of Trinidad and Tobago. On 25 January 1853 they arrived in Trinidad aboard the Benares. They were indentured at the Concord Estate in Pointe-à-Pierre. After three months, his mother died of malaria and his stepfather took little interest in him. He was informally adopted by a Hindu couple who gave him the name Gokool.

Once he was old enough, Gokool secured his own indentureship contract with the Concord Estate. He renewed his contract once it expired, and then went out on his own. He purchased a donkey cart and made a living hauling sugarcane to the factory at Usine Sainte Madeline, then the second largest sugar refinery in the world. After a few years of this trade, he sold his cart and established a shop in Danglade Village on the road to San Fernando (now part of the Petrotrin oil refinery at Pointe-à-Pierre). Gokool was a true entrepreneur who started off in the cane-cart business and then was a shopkeeper. By 1892, Gokool was able to purchase Diamond, Greenhill and River Estates, comprising almost the whole Diego Martin valley, which he developed as cocoa plantations.

He married Rojan and had 17 children, 11 of whom survived. From shopkeeping he moved on to cocoa cultivation, establishing one of the early cocoa plantations in the Diego Martin valley. From cocoa he moved on the real estate, by 1918, Gokool took advantage of recession prices in the wake of World War I and brought several properties in Port-of-Spain. This turned out to be a masterstroke in the long-run, becoming one of the major landlords in Port of Spain. In 1933, he also established himself as a cinema magnate, establishing the Metro cinema in collaboration with MGM. Gokool opened the cinema at the corner of St Vincent and Park Streets, called Green Corner, and called it the Metro Cinema. The ornate faux classical-style building, with its plush red-carpeted walls, could seat over 1,000 people in balcony and pit, and cost over $80,000 to construct. By comparison, in those days you could buy the whole of Aranguez for $22,000. The cinema was as big a hit as its films. He later split with MGM and renamed his cinema the Globe Cinema, eventually operating a string of five cinemas in Port of Spain and San Fernando. He also opened other Globe cinemas in Princes Town and Chaguanas. Gokool died in 1940, aged 92, leaving behind the cinemas he founded.

In 1922 he performed the Haj (Muslim pilgrimage to Mecca) with his son Noor. In 1927, he built a masjid in St James which stands to this day. In his will, he established the Haji Gokool Meah Trust, a trust to continue the charitable works which had earned him the title Meah (benefactor).
