= Wendy Rahamut =

Wendy Rahamut is a Trinidadian author, television personality and chef. She is the author of three internationally published Caribbean cookbooks, and for ten years she published the Caribbean Gourmet magazine. She was the host and executive producer of the TV show Caribbean Flavors, which ran on CCN and CNMG from 1998 to 2017. She introduced Indigenous Bites, an on-line cooking show with the objective of highlighting local indigenous ingredients and their uses in Trinidad.

Rahamut was the weekly food writer for the Trinidad Guardian from 1995 to 2017. Since then she writes her weekly food column for the Trinidad Newsday.

She trained in Canada and is of Indo-Trinidadian Descent.

== Books ==
- Caribbean Flavors
- Modern Caribbean Cuisine
- Curry Callaloo and Calypso
