= Donald Ramsamooj =

Trinidadian cricketer

Personal information
- Born: 5 July 1932; San Fernando, Trinidad
- Died: 24 May 1994 (aged 61); Toronto, Ontario, Canada
- Batting: Right-handed
- Bowling: Right-arm off spin
- Role: Batsman

Domestic team information
- Years: Team
- 1952–1957: Trinidad
- 1958–1964: Northamptonshire

Career statistics
Competition	First-class	List A
Matches	79	6
Runs scored	2,755	49
Batting average	20.55	12.25
100s/50s	4/9	0/0
Top score	132	21
Balls bowled	222	–
Wickets	3	–
Bowling average	59.33	–
5 wickets in innings	0	–
10 wickets in match	0	–
Best bowling	1/28	–
Catches/stumpings	36/–	7/–
- Source: CricketArchive, 21 June 2010

Donald Ramsamooj (5 July 1932 – 23 May 1994) was a professional cricketer who spent his career between Trinidad and Northamptonshire.

== Career ==
Ramsamooj started his career and played five first-class games for Trinidad during a five-year spell before moving to England to join Northamptonshire. While at Northampton, he played 71 games and scored his highest first-class score of 132 against Derbyshire in 1963.
