= Rabi Maharaj =

Indian author and speaker

Rabi Maharaj (born 8 August 1947) is Trinidadian-born Indian author and evangelist. He is descendant of a long line of Brahmin priests and gurus from the city of Varanasi (Banaras) in Uttar Pradesh, India. Before moving to London in 1967, he converted to Christianity, and then authored the book Death of a Guru, the story of his conversion to Christianity, first published in 1977. The book has been translated into over 60 languages.

== Biography ==
Maharaj grew up in a Hindu community in Trinidad and Tobago. Trained as a yogi, he eventually converted to Christianity After pre-medical studies in London, he received theological training at London School of Theology (formerly London Bible College), and then began charity work.

== Maharaj's Work ==
Maharaj has worked with Billy Graham, preached in thousands of churches, university campuses, and auditoriums all over the world. He also worked to rehabilitate drug addicts in Europe in the 1970s. He is founder of East-West Gospel Ministries.

== Lectures and Broadcasts ==
Maharaj's most popular lecture topics have included "Encounters with the Supernatural" and "Krishna, Buddha, Mohammad, or Christ?". His other speaking topics have included, "Sexual Mysticism", "Yoga and Meditation in the West", and "Death of a Guru: A Search for Truth". Maharaj has appeared in several documentaries including the Mystics and Gods of the New Age.
