= Ria Persad =

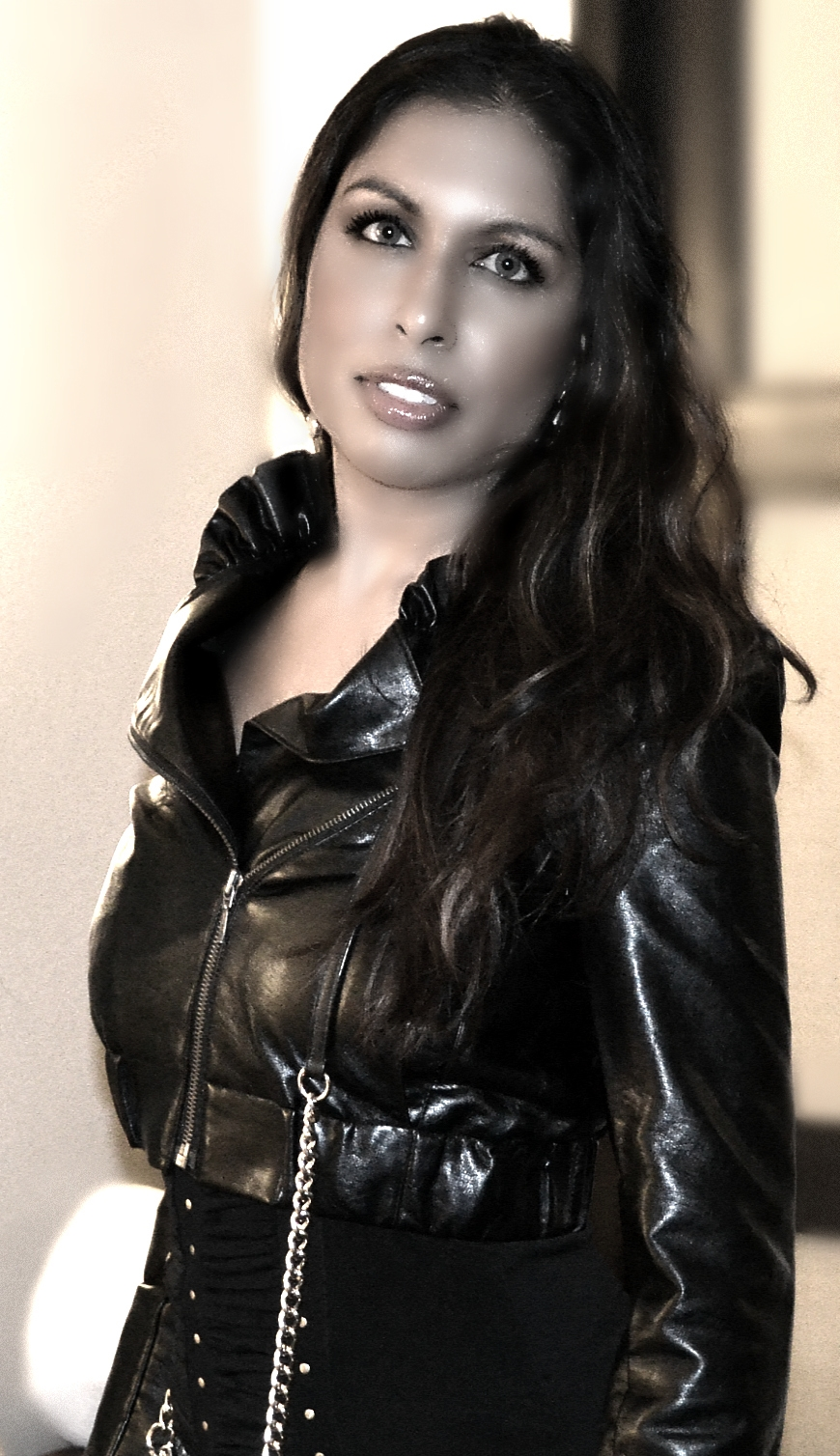
- Ria Persad, October 2015
- Born: June 18, 1974 (age 51); Port of Spain, Trinidad and Tobago
- Occupations: Mathematician; Pianist

Ria Nutan Persad (born June 18, 1974, in Trinidad and Tobago), also known as Ria Carlo, is a mathematician and a classical musician of Indian descent. She moved to the United States of America as a child. She currently mentors technology companies and is a public speaker. She is signed as a fashion model, was the Ms. Tennessee titleholder in 2017 and the 2017 Ms. America (US) National Choice Winner. In 2018, Persad was a finalist and titleholder and was granted the title “Mrs. Grand Universe" in a pageant organized by Mrs. Universe in Cebu, Philippines.

== Scientific career ==
As an immigrant at the age of 12, Persad started doing research under mentor Eleanor F. Helin at Jet Propulsion Laboratory, California Institute of Technology, in Asteroid Discovery, Origin, and Motion, and at the age of 13, she was a research assistant at the High-temperature Superconductivity Lab at Boston University. Persad's research in calculus won her the 1st Award for 2 years in a row at the M.I.T. State Science Fair.

From the age of 14, Persad took mathematics coursework at Harvard University. At the age of 16, she graduated valedictorian of the Class of 1991 at Boston Latin School. She was subsequently recruited by Princeton University, where she worked as research assistant under John N. Bahcall at the Institute for Advanced Study on Hubble Space Telescope Data Analysis of Quasar Spectrum Emission. She was a presenter at the Harvard AAVSO.

Persad later studied Mathematics and Physics at the University of Cambridge on a Commonwealth Scholarship. She entered the Ph.D. mathematics program at Rice University in 1995, but did not complete the program, instead taking a job at NASA's Johnson Space Center as a Martian Meteoroid Analyst during the Mars Pathfinder Mission.

Persad received a Highest Honor Award from the Society of Women Engineers. She was honored in the National Scholars Program under President George H. W. Bush. She was awarded citations by Ted Kennedy of the United States Senate and Hazel R. O'Leary of the U.S. Department of Energy. Working as a climatologist at Enron and Duke Energy, she recognized the needs of energy trading and weather risk management operatives. Seeing a gap in the availability of data for these industries, she went on to develop short, medium and long-range weather prediction systems which were peer-reviewed among academia and U.S. Department of Defense scientists and rigorously tested for the top meteorological broadcasting station in the Midwest. Her mathematical and scientific areas of interest have been in Space Physics and Defense Systems, Orbital Dynamics, Geospace and Climatology, Computational Modeling, and Predictive Analytics. She ranked in the Top 7 Global "Lifetime Achievement" Leaders in the Platts Global Energy Awards, the "Oscars" of the Energy industry.

== Business career ==
In 2009, Persad founded StatWeather, a weather and climate services corporation specializing in the novel application of Bayesian neural networks and artificial intelligence to automated forecasting systems. The results of this method came to attention of Platts and Energy Risk, winning StatWeather the 2013 Newcomer of the Year Award and ranking as a top global provider in the Weather Data Management category of Energy Risk Software Rankings. Forbes, in an article on the future of innovation, reported that StatWeather "has managed to double the accuracy of weather forecasts.". In January 2018, StatWeather was ranked as the #1 Climate Technology globally by Environmental Business International.

Since 2019, Persad is the president of the European Chamber of Digital Commerce, formed in 2019 as an activity of the Swiss Chamber of Commerce in The Netherlands, formed in 1933. She hosts the Chamber's 'Digital Future Boardroom', televised by CNNMoney Switzerland and is the Chief Editor of the Chamber's periodical 'Digital Future Magazine'.

== Musical career ==
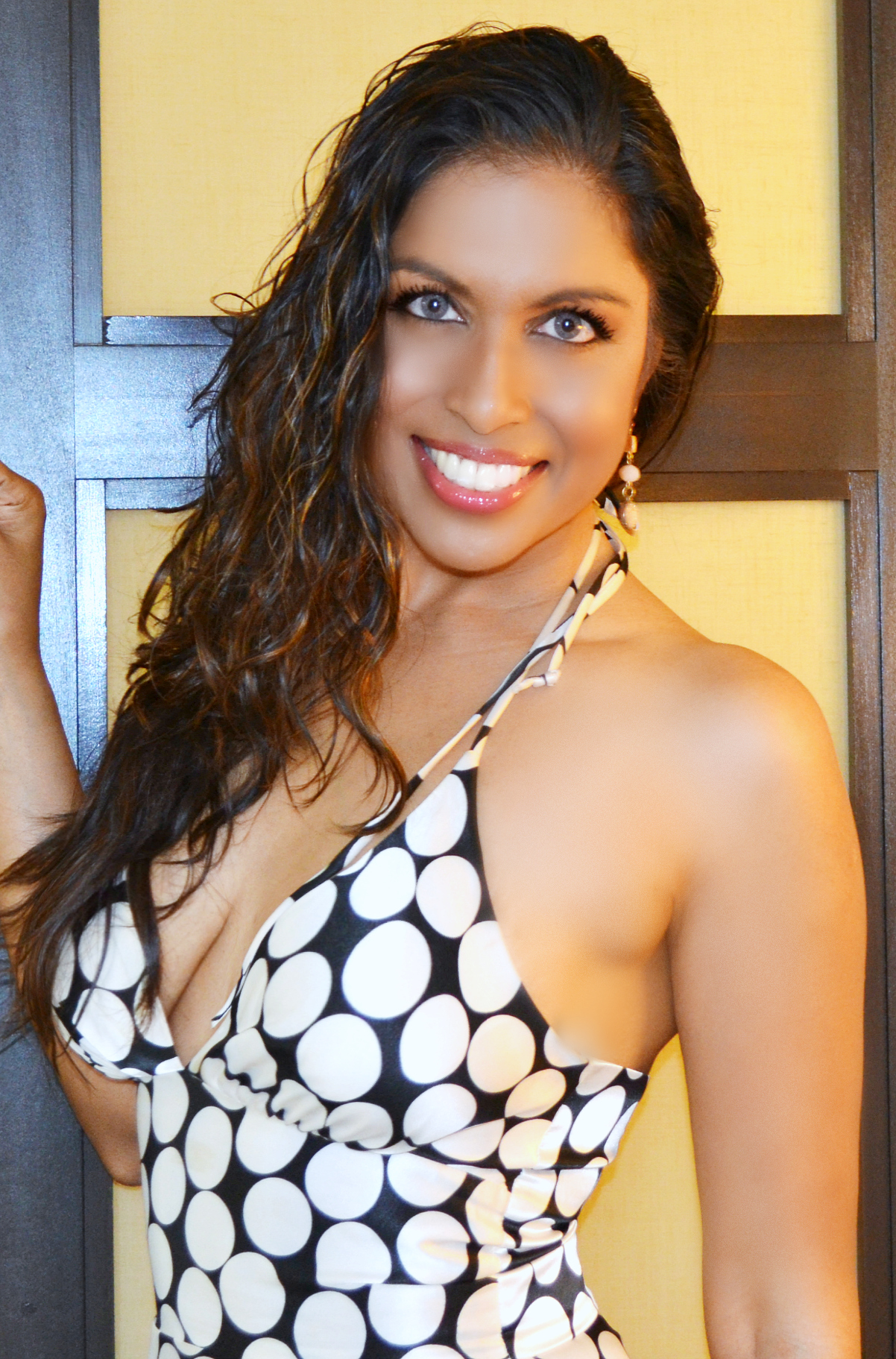
Ria Persad Carlo, October 2015.

Persad first heard the sound of a piano aged 6 when her teacher played "When the Saints Go Marching In." Persad decided to teach herself to play the piano by ear. She eventually received piano lessons at the age of 9, and, at the age of 11, she was considering becoming a concert pianist. She was told that the only way she could survive as a concert pianist was to become the one-in-a-million who wins the International Tchaikovsky Competition. Discouraged, Persad pursued mathematics as a more viable career option. Throughout high school, she continued piano lessons at the New England Conservatory under Alice Canaday, scoring "high honors" on her piano examinations. She became the youngest member and piano accompanist of Princeton University's Glee Club. She also studied pipe organ, early instruments, and voice while in high school and college.

For nearly 20 years, Persad did not pursue classical piano. In 2008, she decided to again take up her hobby of classical piano in the Tampa Bay area of Florida while still working as a mathematician, taking lessons under Linda Pointer and Russian virtuoso Eleonora Lvov. Persad won a series of local and state piano competitions and then became a prizewinner of the 2010 Bradshaw and Buono International Piano Competition and was Artist of the Month. She has given numerous piano performances in Italy and throughout the United States, performing for charities and benefits, and made her Carnegie Hall debut in April 2011.

Persad has been featured in Nancy Williams' piano magazine, Grand Piano Passion, and also appears on Oprah Winfrey's website in a feature on "Turning Dreams Into Reality.".

Persad has released an all-Yamaha CD Solace (2011), a historical journey through 250 years of lyrical classical music with some recordings from rare manuscripts never before commercially available.

Persad was the winner of the 2010 Bradshaw & Buono International Piano Competition.

== Personal life ==
Persad was married to Mark Christopher Carlo, a chemical engineer, in 2009, and is currently divorced. She is the founder of Freedom Scholars of America, a scholarship fund which has awarded over 100 university scholarships. She currently serves as Advisor to JHS-Tek, a health and fitness technology startup. Persad is signed as a model with Wings Model Management. In 2017, she founded the StatWeather Institute, a humanitarian effort featuring global climate and disaster risk as well as climate impacts.
