= Lall Sawh =

Trinidad and Tobago medical researcher (born 1951)

Lall Ramnath Sawh
- Born: 1 June 1951 (age 75); Couva, Trinidad and Tobago
- Education: West Indies School of Medicine, Jamaica; Royal College of Surgeons Edinburgh, Mayo Clinic, Minnesota, USA
- Years active: 1970s-present
- Relatives: Wife: Sylvia S. Sawh (nee Ragobar) - Teacher Son: Dr. Sean L. Sawh - Urologic Surgeon (Harvard Medical School) Son: Dr. Shane S. Sawh - Dental Surgeon (UWI-Trinidad) / University of London
- Medical career
- Profession: Surgeon
- Institutions: Port-of-Spain General Hospital; Southern Medical Clinic, San Fernando; Westshore Medical Clinic, West Moorings
- Sub-specialties: Urology
- Research: Kidney transplantation Urological disease
- Awards: Who's Who in the World of Science and Technology; 100 Greatest Living Surgeons; Chaconia Medal - Gold

Lall Ramnath Sawh CMT, FRCS (Edin), FACS (born 1 June 1951) is a Trinidadian urologist in the Caribbean and Latin America. Based in Trinidad and Tobago, Sawh was a pioneer of kidney transplantation in the Caribbean in 1988 and is a recognized leader in the field of urology.

== Early life and medical training ==
Lall Sawh was born in a Couva, Trinidad and Tobago where most of his time was spent selling produce in a local market. Despite having to utilize brown paper bags as notebooks, Sawh was able to excel in school and attended Naparima College, San Fernando, one of Trinidad's premiere secondary schools. He held the position of "Head Prefect" and subsequently entered medical school at the University of the West Indies - Jamaica, when he was just seventeen years old.

Graduating with first class honours, Sawh was awarded a Commonwealth Scholarship after medical school and moved to the United Kingdom to specialize in urology. In 1985, he moved to the United States to complete his training as a Laparoscopic and Endoscopic Urology Fellow at Mayo Clinic in Rochester, Minnesota. He completed further training at the Urology Department at Washington University School of Medicine. He would later complete further training in transplant surgery and minimally invasive laparoscopic surgery and is credited as introducing these procedures to the Caribbean.

== Career ==
By 1962 Trinidad and Tobago had gained independence from Great Britain, and by 1976 the country had become a republic with the Commonwealth nations. Urology in Trinidad was in its infancy, and the departure of the only two practising urologists left a void in the field. Dr. Sawh was therefore left as the sole urologist, giving him the opportunity to pioneer several urological procedures at the San Fernando General Hospital. This included the introduction of the percutaneous nephrolithotomy surgery for staghorn calculi on the island. After observing the high rate of diabetes and renal failure on the island, Dr. Sawh returned to America for further training in renal transplant surgery. On 27 January 1988, Sawh was the lead Urologist who performed the first set of kidney transplants in the country. He would later collaborate with some of the surgeons on that team on what would become very high-profile cases on the island. Sawh is also acknowledged for introducing renal hypothermic surgery on the island and is credited as the first surgeon in the Caribbean to perform a phalloplasty.

In 1994, Sawh, through his company Uroco Limited, implemented the use of the first Dornier lithotripsy machine in Trinidad, thereby expanding the treatment options available for kidney stone treatment in Trinidad. In 1989, he was awarded the post of Consultant Urologist at Port-of-Spain General Hospital. Due to a paucity of equipment in the government hospitals, he was forced to purchase and use his own equipment during his career at the Port-of-Spain General Hospital. Sawh was also awarded the post of senior lecturer at the University of the West Indies - Mt. Hope Medical Sciences Complex in the fields of surgery and urology. He was also a senior examiner for the final year surgery examinations. In 2007, the Government of Trinidad and Tobago authorized free brachytherapy services for the treatment of prostate cancer as a direct appeal from Sawh for that service.

In December 2015, Dr. Sawh made history again when he removed the second largest renal tumor in the western hemisphere. Sawh and his team removed an eight-pound tumour from a 52-year-old man at the Southern Medical Clinic, San Fernando.

On June 1, 2017, Dr. Sawh introduced the Aries system by Dornier MedTech. This is a novel, minimally invasive approach for the treatment of erectile dysfunction.

== Awards ==
Dr. Sawh's services to Trinidad and Tobago have earned him a National award, "The Chaconia Gold Medal" - the highest award given by that country for excellence in the fields of medicine and surgery. At the time of the award, he was 43 years old, making him the youngest person in the history of Trinidad and Tobago to be awarded the Chaconia Medal Gold for his contribution to surgery in Trinidad.

In 2009, Sawh was named a "National Icon" by the Government of Trinidad and Tobago and was furthered honoured by the Society of Surgeons in Trinidad and Tobago when he was featured in their publication Trinidad and Tobago Icons in Science and Technology - Volume II.

In 2012, Sawh was included as one of the few surgeons, and only urologist, in Nasser Khan's historical recount, "Profiles - Heroes, Pioneers & Role Models of Trinidad and Tobago".

In 2018, Sawh was named one of twelve people who helped transform Trinidad and Tobago. He was the only surgeon to make the list.
