= Krishna Maharaj =

British businessman convicted of murder (1939–2024)

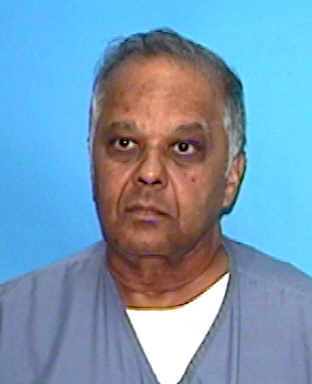
- Prison mug shot of Maharaj
- Born: Krishna Nanan Maharaj; 26 January 1939; Diamond Village, Victoria County, Trinidad and Tobago
- Died: 5 August 2024 (aged 85); Florida, United States
- Other name: Kris Maharaj
- Citizenship: British; Trinidadian
- Occupation: Businessman
- Spouse: Marita Maharaj
- Parents: Nanan Maharaj (father); Dolly Nanan Maharaj (mother)
- Relatives: Ramesh Maharaj (brother); Roopnarine Rambachan (brother-in-law)
- Status: Deceased
- Convictions: First degree murder, kidnapping
- Penalty: Death; commuted to life imprisonment

Krishna Nanan Maharaj (pronounced [kɾiʂɳaː naːnənə məɦaːɾaːdʒə]; 26 January 1939 – 5 August 2024) was a British Trinidadian businessman. In 1987 he was convicted by a Florida, U.S., court of the double murders of Chinese Jamaican businessmen Derrick Moo Young and his adult son Duane Moo Young, and was sentenced to death. Maharaj always denied committing the murders, and according to the human rights organisation Reprieve, the case of Krishna Maharaj was "an epic miscarriage of justice".

Although Reprieve claimed that on 13 September 2019, Federal Magistrate Judge Alicia M. Otazo-Reyes made a legal finding that Maharaj had proven his innocence by "clear and convincing evidence" and that "no reasonable juror could convict him" but ruled that this was not sufficient for Maharaj to be set free, their claim is false. In Maharaj v. Florida Dept. of Corrections, No. 1:17-cv-21965 (S.D. Fla.), on 13 Sept. 2019, MJ Otazo-Reyes only ordered an evidentiary hearing. On 11 Sept. 2020, MJ Otazo-Reyes recommended that his habeas petition be denied, and on 30 Nov. 2020, District Judge Jose Martinez affirmed that recommendation, writing in part:

With this in mind, the Court must also dispel Petitioner’s notion—or insistence, rather— that the Eleventh Circuit’s permission to file a second or successive petition constitutes a finding that no reasonable jurist could find Petitioner guilty—i.e., that its permission amounts to a declaration of Petitioner’s innocence. This is not so.

For example, the Eleventh Circuit stated:

Mr. Maharaj has sufficiently alleged a Brady violation: he learned in 2014 that Mejia—an individual who resided in close proximity to the murder scene and who apparently was involved with the cartel—was under criminal investigation of the Moo Young murders, a fact that the prosecution or the police knew but did not disclose.

11th COA Order Permitting Successive Petition, ECF No. 63-1 at 5. This statement, however, merely means that Maharaj has made a threshold showing; it is not a finding that a Brady violation indeed occurred. The Eleventh Circuit highlighted this point, stating “’[a]s usual nothing about our ruling here binds the district court, which must decide every aspect of the case fresh, or in the legal vernacular, de novo.’” Id. at 6 (quoting In re Chance, 831 F.3d 335, 1338 (11th Cir. 2016)). This includes—as the Eleventh Circuit clarified—“the merits” of Maharaj’s Brady claims. Id. at 7.

== Background ==
Maharaj was of Indo-Trinidadian descent and was the brother of Ramesh Maharaj, former Attorney General of Trinidad and Tobago. He was also the brother of Indra Rambachan (née Maharaj), who is married to National Award-winner lawyer Roopnarine Rambachan.

== Charge and detention ==
According to the prosecution, in December 1986 Maharaj arranged a false meeting with Derrick Moo Young in the DuPont Plaza Hotel, in order to demand Moo Young repay money that he had fraudulently taken from Maharaj's relatives in Trinidad. Derrick Moo Young turned up at room 1215 together with his son Duane. Once inside the room, Maharaj is said to have appeared with a gun from behind a door. An argument resulted, and the father, Derrick Moo Young, was allegedly shot to death by Maharaj. The prosecution stated that the son, Duane, was then taken upstairs in the suite and shot by Maharaj.

In 1997, a Florida court overturned the death sentence. In 2001, almost 300 British politicians, church leaders and judges wrote a letter to the then Governor of Florida, Jeb Bush, asking for a retrial. The letter stated that there were "astonishing flaws" in the case against Maharaj. Among those signing the letter were Lord Goldsmith, then Attorney General for England and Wales and Northern Ireland, Lynda Clark, then Advocate General for Scotland, Charles Kennedy, then Leader of the Liberal Democrats, Ken Livingstone, then Mayor of London, and Nicholas Lyell, former Attorney General for England and Wales and Northern Ireland.

The governor denied him a retrial; Maharaj was instead re-sentenced to life imprisonment in 2002.

In 2006, the British human rights organisation Reprieve made an appeal to Governor Jeb Bush for clemency on Maharaj's behalf, pointing out that the jury had heard from none of Maharaj's alibi witnesses, who would have put him 25 miles away at the time of the murder; that the prosecution's star witness had changed his story several times; and that evidence had emerged since the trial that the murder victims were involved in money laundering and had links to drug traffickers, and that there were a number of alternative suspects with strong motives, which had not been considered at the time. The appeal was denied.

In 2008, Reprieve made a second appeal for clemency to the then Governor of Florida, Charlie Crist, but this appeal was also denied.

On 24 April 2014, Judge William Thomas, from the 11th Judicial Circuit Court of Florida, Miami, allowed Maharaj's lawyer to present witnesses during an evidentiary hearing.

On 14 November 2014, Henry Cuervo, a former US Drug Enforcement Administration Agent, told a court that ex-hitman Jhon Jairo Velásquez Vásquez had confessed to him that Pablo Escobar had arranged the hit on the Moo Youngs. Cuervo said that Velásquez wanted to clear his conscience and had asked Cuervo to testify on his behalf. He also submitted an affidavit from Velásquez – a cartel assassin known as "Popeye" who was recently released from prison in Colombia, where he is reviled as one of the country's most infamous killers.

On 4 April 2017, the US 11th Circuit Court of Appeals granted a hearing based on evidence pointing to the involvement of Pablo Escobar's Medellín Cartel in the killings of which Maharaj had been convicted. The court said that the additional witnesses had presented "compelling" accounts that "independently corroborate one another's" and that "[a]ll five individuals' stories reflect that the Moo Youngs were killed by the cartel."

Maharaj died on 5 August 2024, at the age of 85. His body was flown to the United Kingdom, where his wife lives in the town of Bridport in Dorset. His funeral was held on 27 August 2024 in West Bay.
