= Dole Chadee =

Caribbean drug lord

Dole Chadee (born Nankissoon Boodram) (executed June 4, 1999) was an accused drug lord and convicted murderer. His base of operation was in Piparo, Trinidad and Tobago.

Chadee was reputed to be one of the top drug lords in the Caribbean, but was never convicted of drug-related offenses. Together with eight members of his gang, he was convicted of the January 10, 1994 murders of Deo, Rookmin, Hamilton and Monica Baboolal of Piparo. All nine were executed over a four-day period in Port of Spain. Dole Chadee's last rites were performed by his priest, the late Pundit Karamchandra Dinanath Dubay located in Sangre Grande.

After his arrest, Chadee's 46.5 hectare estate with a number of erected buildings in the rural village of Piparo, in south central Trinidad, was reclaimed by the authorities, under the amended Dangerous Drugs Act of 1991, after it was discovered that he was squatting on state land for more than 15 years. In February 1999, it was converted by the government into a drug rehabilitation centre.

Almost 20 years after he was sentenced to death for murder and executed, a letter allegedly containing the crime lord's last confession has surfaced on Facebook.

== Bibliography ==
- Report from the UN Human Rights Committee
- Trinidad and Tobago: Three men hanged today - Amnesty International, June 4, 1999.
- Drug Lord’s Estate Turned Addicts’ Haven
