= Neeshan Prabhoo =

Trinidadian chutney musician

Neeshan Prabhoo, also known as "The Hitman" or "D'Hitman" is a Trinidadian chutney musician.
