= Persaud =

Persaud is a Hindu surname primarily found in the Caribbean, especially Guyana and Trinidad and Tobago. It is derived from the Hindi surname प्रसाद which is predominantly transliterated as Prasad in India. Other variant forms include Persad, Prashad, Persard, Pershad, Prasada, Prashad, Presad, and Presaud.

The surname primarily originated in the Hindi Belt of India, especially in the present-day states of Bihar, Uttar Pradesh, Jharkhand, and Madhya Pradesh; it also originated in the neighboring Terai-Madhesh region of Nepal. Persaud is the most prevalent surname in Guyana with 21,855 Guyanese persons documented to hold the name. It is the 22nd most prevalent name in Suriname. Persad is also the sixteenth most prevalent surname in Trinidad and Tobago and the other variant, Persaud, is the 431st most prevalent surname. Persaud is also the number one most popular Hindu surname in the United States, based on data from the 2010 U.S. census.

== Etymology and history ==
The name Persaud means "Gracious gift" originally deriving from Hindi "Prasad". The name has connection to multiple Dharmic religions including Hinduism, Jainism and Sikhism where "Prasada" is a food that is used in religious offering.

== Geographical distribution ==
Persaud is the most common surname in Guyana, where 1 in 35 persons hold the surname; it is also an increasingly common name in Canada, ranking 862nd, and the UK where 1 in 52,000 hold the surname. This is due to a large amount of Indo-Caribbean immigration to North America and Europe (mainly the United Kingdom and the Netherlands).

== Notable people named Persaud ==
=== Persaud ===
- Anjulie Persaud (b. 1983), an Indo-Guyanese Canadian singer
- Avinash Persaud (b. 1966), an Indo-Bajan businessman
- Bernadette Indira Persaud (b. 1946), Indo-Guyanese painter
- Bishnodat Persaud (1933–2016), a British Indo-Guyanese economist
- Christopher Paul Persaud-Jagdhar (b. 1967), professionally known as CJ Wildheart, British Guyanese-Seychellois musician
- Deborah Persaud (b. 1960), an Indo-Guyanese American virologist
- John Derek Persaud (born 1956), Guyanese-born Jamaican Roman Catholic bishop
- Kriskal Persaud (b. 1975), an Indo-Guyanese chess player
- Lakshmi Persaud (b. 1939), a British Indo-Trinidadian writer
- Nikhil Persaud, a British poker player
- Rajendra Persaud (b. 1963), a British Indo-Trinidadian/Indo-Guyanese psychiatrist
- Reepu Daman Persaud (1936–2013), an Indo-Guyanese former agricultural minister of Guyana
- Robert Persaud (b. 1974), Guyanese Foreign Secretary and former minister
- Roxanne Persaud (b. 1966), Indian-African Guyanese American politician
- Shanta Persaud, diabetes researcher and academic

=== Persad ===
- Kamla Persad-Bissessar (b. 1952), first woman to be Prime Minister of Trinidad and Tobago
- Prakash Persad, Trinidad and Tobago politician
- Ria Persad (also known as Ria Persad Carlo) (b. 1974), a Trinidad and Tobago mathematician, classical musician and model

=== Prashad ===
- Thara Prashad (born 1982) - singer and model
