= British Indo-Caribbean people =

Residents of the UK

Total population
- Indo-Guyanese - Unknown; Indo-Jamaican - Unknown; Indo-Trinidadians - Approx 25,000; Indo-Surinamese - Unknown

Regions with significant populations
- United Kingdom; In particular London, Birmingham, Manchester, Leicester, Leeds, Glasgow, Preston, Sheffield, Liverpool, Nottingham, Southampton, Bristol, Newcastle upon Tyne, Slough, Edinburgh, Cardiff, Stoke on Trent, Coventry

Languages
- British English (predominantly Multicultural London English); Caribbean English (predominantly Trinidadian and Tobagonian and Guyanese); Caribbean Hindustani; Hinglish; Tamil

Religion
- Majority: Hinduism; Significant Minority: Christianity; Islam; Other Minority: Sikhism; Jainism; Buddhism; Zoroastrianism; Baháʼí; Others

Related ethnic groups
- British Indians · Indian diaspora · Indo-Caribbean people · Indo-Caribbean Americans · Dutch Indo-Caribbeans

British Indo-Caribbean people are British citizens, whose recent ancestors came from the Caribbean, and who further trace their ancestry back to India and the wider subcontinent. The UK has a large population of Indo-Caribbean people.

== Background ==
Indian people were first introduced to the Caribbean as indentured laborers by the British government beginning in the 1830s after the abolition of slavery and when cheap labour was needed. The majority settled in Trinidad and Tobago, Guyana, and Suriname. There are smaller but well established population in Jamaica, Saint Lucia and other Caribbean countries. The Indian communities in these countries have now become extremely well established and currently have a very successful diaspora. With the strong links between the Caribbean and the UK, as well as the large Indian community in the UK, it has proven a popular destination for Indo-Caribbean emigrants. In 1990, between 22,800 and 30,400 Indo-Caribbean people were estimated to be living in the UK. In the recent UK 2021 census, 10,841 persons self-identified as having Indo-Caribbean ancestry using the categories of "Other ethnic group: Caribbean Asian" and "Mixed or Multiple ethnic groups: Caribbean Asian. This is a lower estimate as Indo-Caribbean people had to write this in for their ethnicity under Asian: Other, and may have found it easier to click Asian: Indian for example.

== Sub-groups ==
=== British Indo-Guyanese people ===
Notable Britons of Indo-Guyanese descent include Arif Ali, Waheed Alli, Baron Alli, Shakira Caine, David Dabydeen, Gina Miller, Bishnodat Persaud, Avinash Persaud, Raj Persaud and Gordon Warnecke, and Mark Ramprakash.

=== British Indo-Jamaicans ===
A notable Briton of Indo-Jamaican descent is Lee Gopthal. The British eighties pop group Five Star are of Indo Caribbean descent through their mother.

=== British Indo-Trinidadians ===
Indo-Trinidadian people are thought to number well over 25,000, which is even more than the number of people born in Trinidad and Tobago living in the UK according to the 2001 Census. Notable Britons of Indo-Trinidadian descent include Waheed Alli, Baron Alli, Chris Bisson, Vahni Capildeo, Krishan Kumar, Krishna Maharaj, Shiva Naipaul, V. S. Naipaul, Lakshmi Persaud, Avinash Persaud and Raj Persaud.

== See also ==
- Indo-Caribbean people
- British Indians
- Indian Canadians
- British African-Caribbean people
- British Asian
- Indo-Caribbean Americans
