= Prasad =

Prasad and similar terms commonly refer to:

- Prasad (food offering), a religious offering in Hinduism and Sikhism
- Prasad (name), an Indian name (includes a list of people with this name)

Prasad and similar terms may also refer to:

== Arts and entertainment ==
- Prasad (2012 film), an Indian Kannada-language drama
- Prasad (2018 film), a Nepali language social drama romance

== Other uses ==
- Prasada Rao (disambiguation)
- Prasad Art Pictures, an Indian film production house
- Prasad Studios, an Indian motion picture post production studios
- L. V. Prasad Eye Institute, in Hyderabad, India
- Prāsāda, the Sanskrit term for 'palace' or 'temple', known in Southeast Asia as prasat; see Prasat (disambiguation)
- Prasadi (elephant), an elephant that belonged to Guru Gobind Singh at the turn of the 18th century
- The Prasada, a luxury building in New York City

== See also ==
- Persada (disambiguation)
- Persaud, a surname
- Prasaadam, a 1976 Indian Malayalam film
