= Prasad (name) =

Prasad is an Indian subcontinental name, used as a personal name, middle name, or surname. It is derived from the Sanskrit term prasāda, meaning “grace,” “blessing,” or “divine gift.” In Hinduism, prasāda also refers to an offering that has been blessed by a deity and received as a sacred gift. When used with a personal name, Prasad conveys the meaning of a divine blessing or gift bestowed upon the family. Examples include:

- Devi Prasad – "the gift of a Devi"
- Hari Prasad – "the gift of Hari"
- Lakshmi Prasad – "the gift of Lakshmi"
- Shiva Prasad – "the gift of Shiva"

== Geographical distribution ==
As of 2014, 95.9% of all known bearers of the surname Prasad were residents of India, 0.8% were residents of Nepal, and 0.7% were residents of Fiji. In India, the frequency of the surname was higher than national average in the following states and union territories:

1. Bihar (1: 71)
2. Uttarakhand (1: 103)
3. Sikkim (1: 147)
4. Uttar Pradesh (1: 162)
5. Delhi (1: 196)

== Notable people with the last name Prasad ==
=== Scientists ===
- Ananda Prasad, Indian biochemist specialising in Zinc metabolism
- Ganesh Prasad, Indian mathematician
- Kavirayani Ramakrishna Prasad, Indian chemist, recipient of Shanti Swarup Bhatnagar Prize (2014)
- Malur R. Narasimha Prasad, Indian endocrinologist at the World Health Organisation
- Vinay Prasad, American hematologist-oncologist

=== Politicians ===
- Badri Nath Prasad, Indian politician member of Rajya Sabha (1964–1966)
- Biman Prasad, Indo-Fijian politician
- Brij Behari Prasad, Indian politician, murdered minister in the government of Bihar
- H. S. Mahadeva Prasad, Indian politician
- Jitin Prasada, Indian politician from the Bhartiya Janata Party
- Jitendra Prasada, Indian politician and a former vice-president of the Indian National Congress
- Mahaveer Prasad, Indian politician, Governor of Himachal Pradesh (1995, 1996–1997), member of Lok Sabha (from 2004)
- Rajen Prasad, Indo-Fijian politician in New Zealand
- Rajendra Prasad, first President of India
- Ravi Shankar Prasad, Indian lawyer, politician, Minister of Law and Justice, Minister of Electronics and Information Technology, and Minister of Communications
- Srinivasa Prasad, Indian politician
- Yarlagadda Lakshmi Prasad, Indian writer and politician, Chairman of the A.P. Hindi Academy, member of Rajya Sabha (1996–2002)

=== Performers ===
- L. V. Prasad, Indian film actor, producer and director
- Narendra Prasad, Indian actor, playwright, director, teacher and literary critic
- Nutan Prasad, Indian film actor
- Rajendra Prasad, Telugu Indian film actor
- Shweta Basu Prasad, Indian actress

=== Film production ===
- Ramesh Prasad, Indian businessman and chairman of Prasad Studios
- Sreekar Prasad, Indian film editor
- Devi Sri Prasad, Indian music composer, lyricist, singer, and director
- V. Vijayendra Prasad, Indian film screenwriter and director

=== Sportspeople ===
- M. S. K. Prasad, Indian cricketer, chief selector of the Indian National Cricket Team
- Venkatesh Prasad, Indian cricketer

=== Historians ===
- Ishwari Prasad, Indian historian
- Vijay Prashad, Indian historian and journalist

=== Others ===
- Brajkishore Prasad, lawyer, Indian independence activist
- Eswar Prasad, American economist
- H. Y. Sharada Prasad, Indian civil servant, journalist and writer, media adviser to Indira Gandhi
- Jaishankar Prasad, Indian litterateur and writer
- R. Prasad, Indian cartoonist
- Shalini Prasad, Indian bioengineer

== Notable people with the middle name Prasad ==
- Amod Prasad Upadhyay, Nepali politician
- Ananta Prasad Paudel, Nepali politician
- Bidur Prasad Sapkota, Nepali politician
- Bishnu Prasad Shrestha, Nepali Gorkha soldier of the Indian Army
- Bishweshwar Prasad Koirala, former Prime Minister of Nepal
- Dilendra Prasad Badu, Nepali politician
- Dip Prasad Pun, Nepali Gurkha soldier of the British Army
- Durga Prasad Bhattarai, Nepali representative
- Girija Prasad Joshi, Nepali poet
- Girija Prasad Koirala, former Prime Minister of Nepal
- Gopal Prasad Rimal, Nepali poet
- Govind Prasad Lohani, Nepali politician
- Guru Prasad Mainali, Nepali storywriter
- Hora Prasad Joshi, Nepali Justice
- Kali Prasad Baskota, Nepali singer
- Keshab Prasad Badal, Nepali politician
- Keshav Prasad Mainali, Nepali politician
- Khadga Prasad Oli, former Prime Minister of Nepal
- Krishna Prasad Bhattarai, former Prime Minister of Nepal
- Krishna Prasad Koirala, Nepali politician
- Kul Prasad Nepal, Nepali politician
- Lalu Prasad Yadav, Indian politician
- Laxmi Prasad Devkota, Nepali Poet; titled Mahakavi
- Madhav Prasad Ghimire, Nepali Poet; titled Rastrakavi
- Man Prasad Khatri, Nepali politician
- Mata Prasad, Indian Administrative Service officer
- Matrika Prasad Koirala, former Prime Minister of Nepal
- Nagendra Prasad Rijal, former Prime Minister of Nepal
- Nanda Prasad Adhikari, Nepali activist
- Narayan Prasad Adhikari, Nepali politician
- Rabindra Prasad Adhikari, Nepali politician
- Ram Raja Prasad Singh, Nepali politician
- Rameshwor Prasad Dhungel, Nepali politician
- Subash Prasad Khakurel, Nepali national cricketer
- Tanka Prasad Acharya, former Prime Minister of Nepal
- Tarini Prasad Koirala, Nepali politician
- Thakur Prasad Mainali, Nepali artist
- Vinaya Prasad, Indian actress
- Yadav Prasad Pant, Nepali economist

== Notable people with the given name Prasad ==
- Ahuti Prasad, Indian character actor
- Dhammika Prasad, Sri Lankan cricketer
- Devendra Prasad Gupta, Indian academician and a former vice chancellor of Ranchi University
- Prasad Babu, South Indian film actor
- Prasad Barve, Indian television actor
- Prasad Bidapa, fashion designer specialised in training models for the Miss India beauty pageants
- Prasad Dias, Sri Lankan cricketer
- Prasad Murella, Indian film cinematographer
- Prasad Shrikant Purohit, Indian army officer
- Samta Prasad, Indian classical musician and tabla player

== See also ==
- Persaud
- Prasad (disambiguation)
- Prasada Rao (disambiguation)
