= 29 East 32nd Street =

Building in Manhattan, New York

- Old Grolier Club
- U.S. National Register of Historic Places
- New York State Register of Historic Places
- New York City Landmark
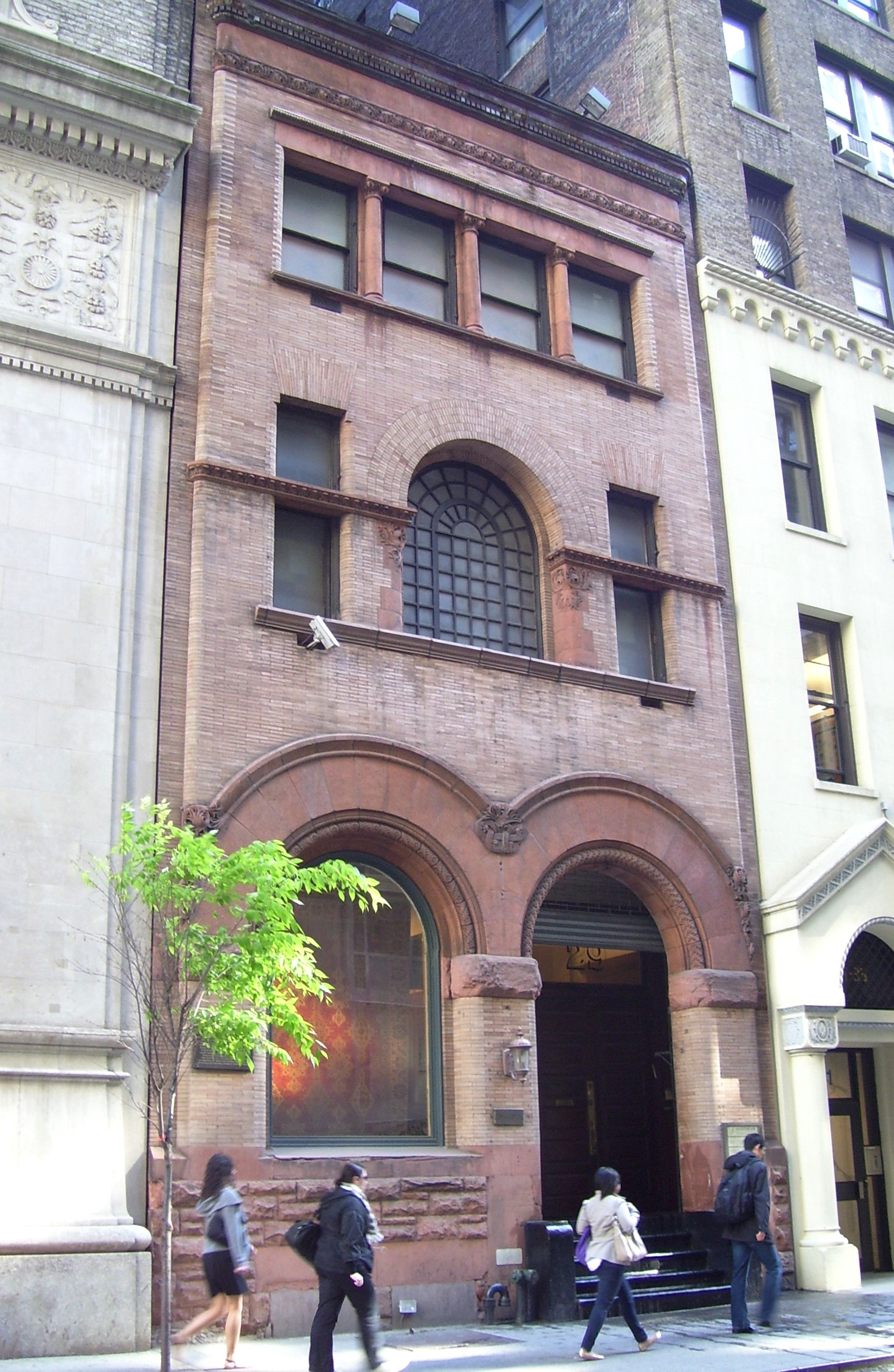

- Location within New York City Location within New York Location within the United States
- Location: 29 East 32nd Street, Manhattan, New York City, New York
- Coordinates: 40°44′47″N 73°59′2″W
- Built: 1889
- Architect: Charles W. Romeyn
- Architectural style: Romanesque or Richardsonian Romanesque
- NRHP reference No.: 80002707
- NYSRHP No.: 06101.000632
- NYCL No.: 0597

Significant dates
- Added to NRHP: April 23, 1980
- Designated NYSRHP: June 23, 1980
- Designated NYCL: August 18, 1970

29 East 32nd Street (also known as the Old Grolier Club or Gilbert Kiamie House) is a building in Manhattan, New York City. Built in 1889 and designed by Charles W. Romeyn in the Richardsonian Romanesque style, it originally housed the Grolier Club. It is now called the Madison and became a New York City designated landmark in 1970. It was added to the National Register of Historic Places in 1980. Since 2023, the Korean restaurant Moono, a sister restaurant to Michelin-starred eatery Jua, has occupied the downstairs space.

== See also ==
- List of New York City Designated Landmarks in Manhattan from 14th to 59th Streets
- National Register of Historic Places listings in Manhattan from 14th to 59th Streets
