= Persada =

Persada may refer to:

- PT Asiatic Persada, a palm oil firm from Jambi, Indonesia
- Persada PLUS, original name of PLUS Expressways, a large highway concessionaries or build–operate–transfer operator company in Malaysia
- Persada Johor International Convention Centre, Johor Bahru, Johor, Malaysia

== See also ==
- Prasad (disambiguation)
- Persad, a variant of the name Persaud, also Persard, Pershard, Prasada, Prashad, Presad, Presaud and Persand.
