= Taffin (surname) =

Taffin is a surname. Notable people with the surname include:

- Jean Taffin (1529–1602), Dutch Walloon minister, theologian, and author
- John Taffin (1939–2025), American author
- Rémi Taffin (born 1975), French engineer

== See also ==
- Taffin Khan (born 1992), Guyanese chess player
- James de Givenchy (born 1963), American businessman and jewelry designer, son of Jean-Claude
- Jean-Claude de Givenchy (1925–2009), French aristocrat, businessman, and perfumer
