= East 73rd Street Historic District =

Block of former carriage houses in Manhattan, New York

- U.S. National Register of Historic Places
- U.S. Historic district
- New York State Register of Historic Places
- New York City Landmark
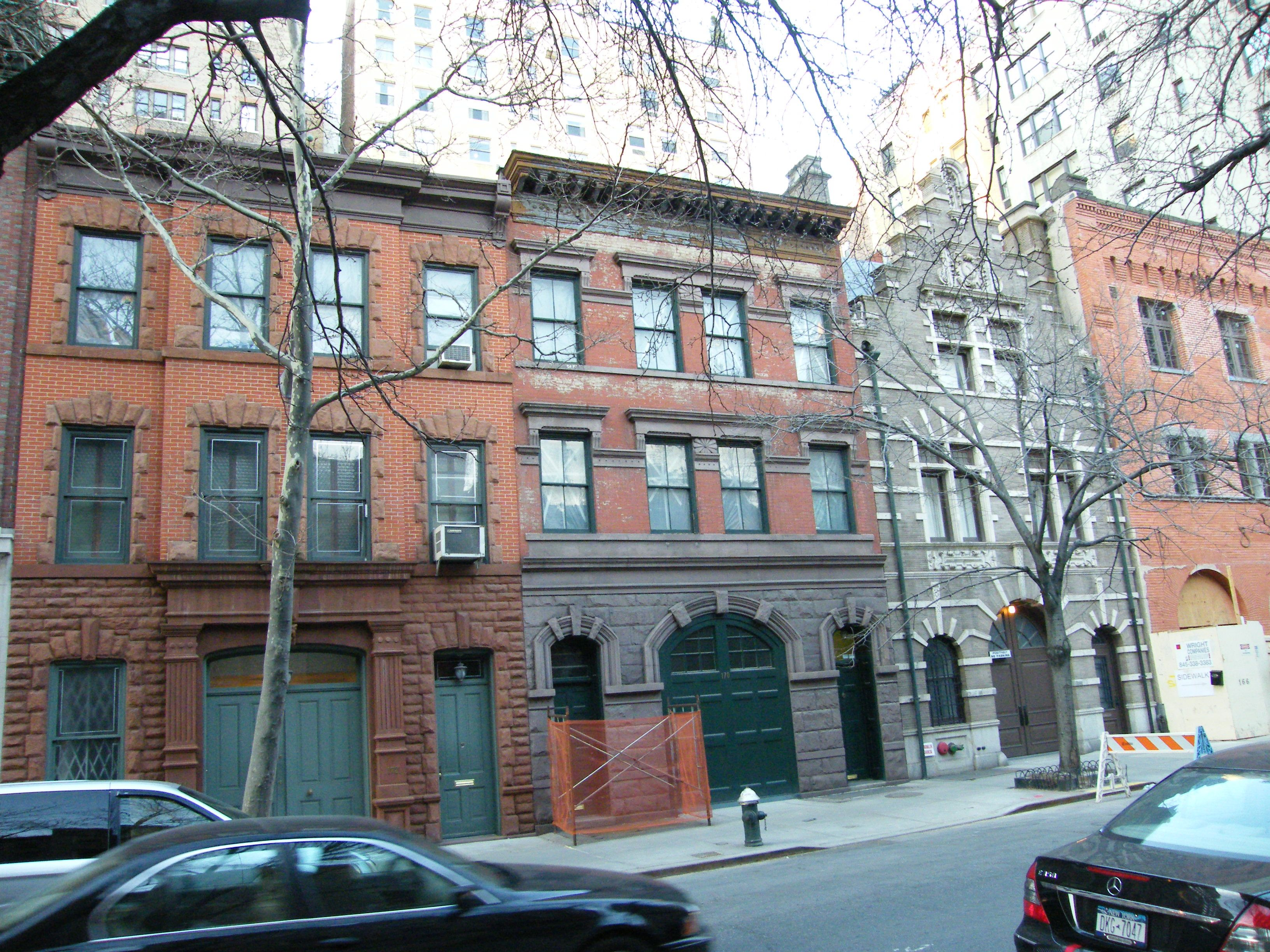
- 168–174 East 73rd Street, all former carriage houses on south side, 2009

- Location within New York City
- Location: Upper East Side, New York, NY
- Coordinates: 40°46′14″N 73°57′39″W
- Area: 1.4 acres (5,700 m^{2})
- Built: 1860–1920
- Architect: Various
- Architectural style: Italianate, Romanesque, Beaux-Arts
- NRHP reference No.: 82003374
- NYCL No.: 1058–1071, 1229

Significant dates
- Added to NRHP: July 22, 1982
- Designated NYSRHP: June 16, 1982
- Designated NYCL: May 13, 1980

The East 73rd Street Historic District is a block of that street on the Upper East Side of the New York City borough of Manhattan, on the south side of the street between Lexington and Third Avenues. It is a neighborhood of small rowhouses built from the mid-19th to early 20th centuries.

Many of the houses were originally carriage houses for wealthy residents of the Upper East Side, such as Edward Harkness, and their facades still reflect that origin. Among the architects who designed the buildings were Richard Morris Hunt and Charles Romeyn. Later owners included Joseph Pulitzer. Eventually the buildings were converted for automotive use. Some have become purely residential.

The block has remained architecturally distinct even as those around it have seen larger and more modern construction replace all or some of their original buildings. In 1980 the individual buildings were designated New York City Landmarks, and two years later it was added to the National Register of Historic Places as a single historic district.

== Geography ==
Most of the buildings on either side of 73rd Street between Lexington and Third Avenues are part of the 1.4-acre (5,700 m^{2}) district. Specifically, the fifteen buildings from 161 to 169 and from 166 to 182 East 73rd Street make up the historic district. This excludes the two large apartment buildings, constructed later at the intersection with Lexington Avenue on the west side of the block.

This area is flat and just outside the boundaries of the larger Upper East Side Historic District, designated later. The buildings along this block are from three to five stories in height, lower than the more modern buildings on adjacent blocks. All are contributing properties; there are no non-contributing resources in the district.

At the time of its creation the district was not contiguous with the Upper East Side Historic District to the west. In 2010 that district's boundaries were extended slightly by the city so that it now includes the buildings at 150 and 153–157 (usually referred to as 155) East 73rd Street, immediately adjacent to the district. This extension has not yet been recognized at the state or federal level.

== History ==
Development of the future Upper East Side began in the early 1860s with the construction of rowhouses for middle and working class buyers on the cross streets several blocks east of Central Park. Among those houses were a row of six built by an E.H. Robbins on East 73rd. Two of those, 171 and 175, are the only rowhouses left from that group.

In the decades at the end of the century, the city's wealthy began building large houses for themselves near the park, sometimes demolishing the original rowhouses to do so. The East 73rd Street houses were not in an ideal location for such housing, but they were the right distance for carriage houses for their horses and buggies: a short walk from their houses but far enough away that the noise and odor would not disturb them. They usually included housing for the servants who fed and drove the horses.

Richard Morris Hunt designed 166 East 73rd, the first one, for art collector Henry Marquand in 1883. In 1890 the large stable at 182 was built to rent stable space to owners who did not want or could not afford to build their own carriage houses. The other carriage houses were gradually built in the 1890s, with the last ones completed early in the next century. Among these, Charles Romeyn contributed the neo-Flemish building next to Hunt's in 1899. Shortly after Marquard's death, Hunt's was sold to Joseph Pulitzer, then publisher of the New York World, who lived several blocks to the east at 73rd and Park.

By this time the automobile was beginning to come into use, especially among the wealthy residents of the Upper East Side. In 1906 the newest building in the district, 177–79 East 73rd, was built specifically to house cars instead of horses. Two years later, in 1908, the commercial stable across from it at 182 was converted for automotive use as well.

At that same time, in 1907, Standard Oil heir and philanthropist Edward Harkness, who lived nearby at Fifth Avenue and 75th Street, bought 161. He spent two years converting it into a garage with a squash court and locker room upstairs, in addition to chauffeur's quarters. Gradually the other carriage houses followed, with some being sold and converted into owner-occupied housing with an attached garage. By 1920 this process was complete, and the neighborhood assumed its present form.

During the 20th century some of the buildings took on importance in the city's musical community. Pulitzer's estate sold the carriage house at 166 to the MacDowell Club, named after composer and pianist Edward MacDowell, after his death. The club in turn sold it to the Central Gospel Chapel of New York, which met there until 1980. In 1950 the Dalcroze School of Music in New York, the only music teachers' training school in the Western Hemisphere personally authorized by Émile Jaques-Dalcroze, moved into 161 for a few decades.

== Buildings ==
The district's buildings fall into three types, representing different eras of local development: two Italianate rowhouses, 11 carriage houses and two taller structures built for commercial purposes. The rowhouses are the oldest, dating to the early development of the Upper East Side during the Civil War. The carriage houses came later, some built on the site of demolished early rowhouses, with the commercial buildings coming near the end of the block's development.

=== Rowhouses ===
The rowhouses

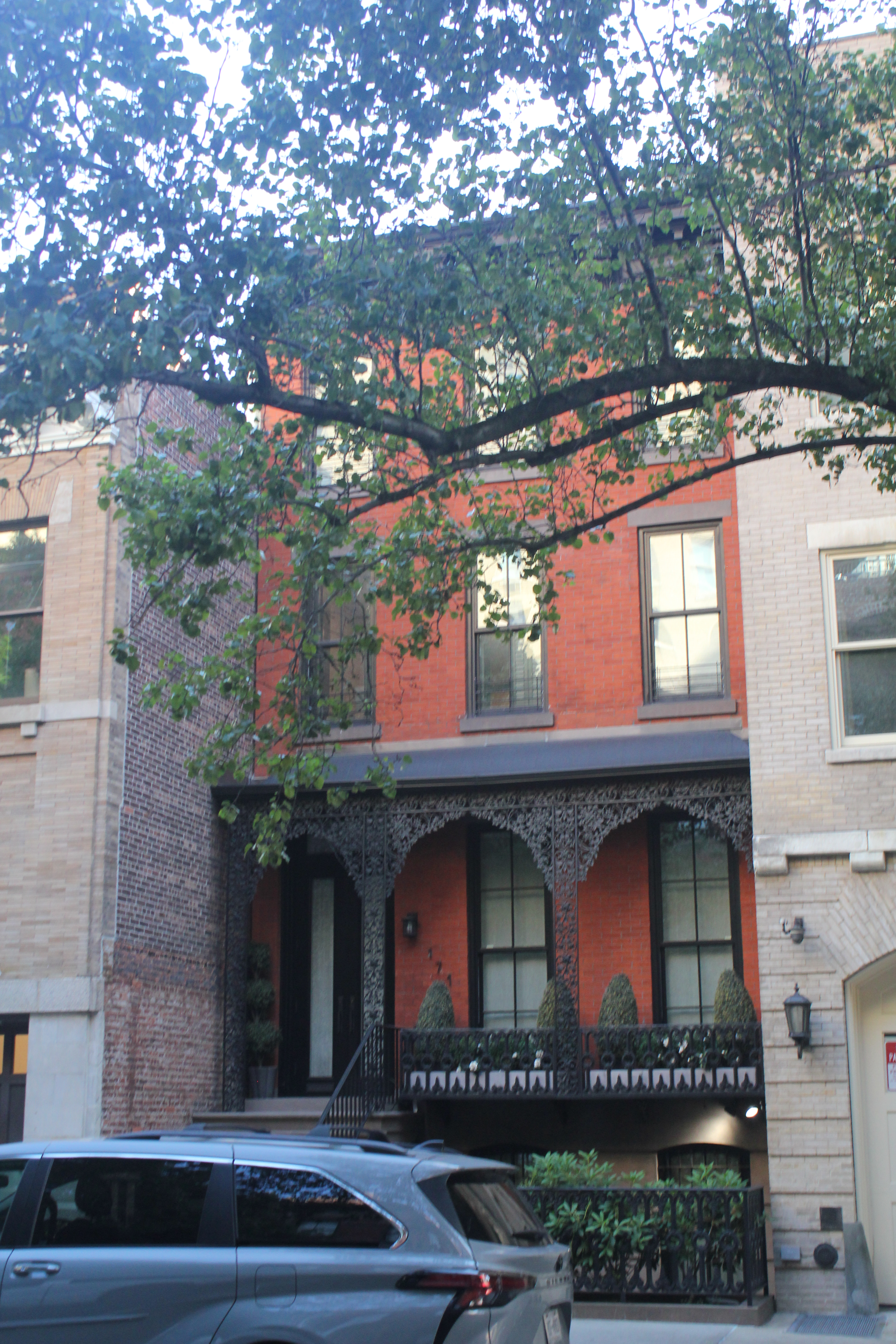
171 East 73rd Street

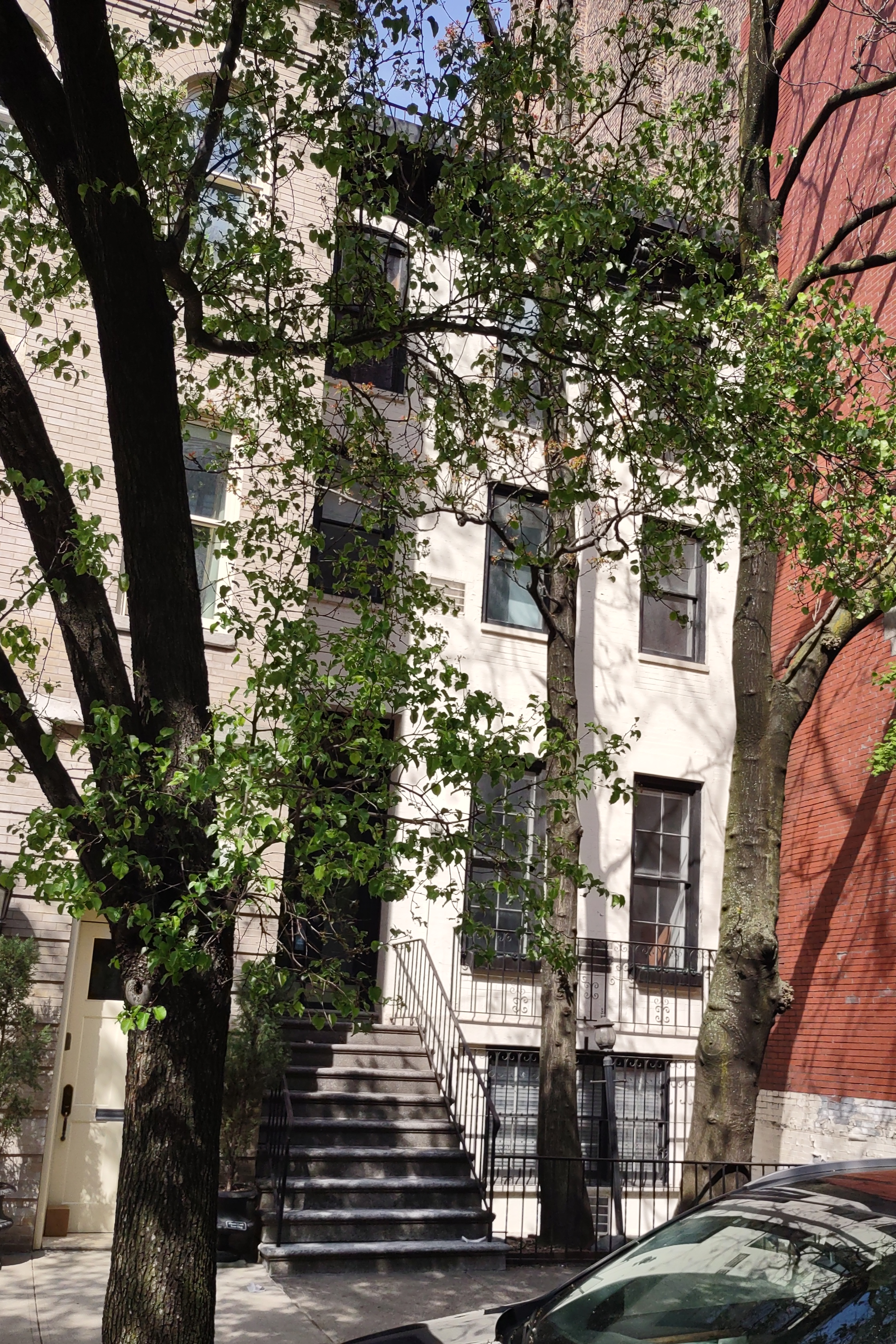
175 East 73rd Street

The two rowhouses are both on the north side of the street, at 171 and 175. Both are narrow three-story brick Italianate buildings built in 1860, part of an original row of six. They are trimmed with stone around the windows and doors and decorative wooden cornices. The house at 171 also retains a cast iron veranda shading the first floor. Once common in the city, few now remain.

=== Carriage houses ===
All the carriage houses follow a similar basic plan that persists despite later conversion into private homes and a variety of facade materials. The ground floor entrance has a large round or segmental arch, but is sometimes flat, with an accompanying pedestrian entrance. Specifically equestrian decorative touches such as symbols or cartouches were kept to a minimum. The interiors have often been extensively remodeled for their current residential use. They are two or three stories tall.

Among the carriage houses, 161 and 163 are distinguished by rock-faced brick with limestone trim. Equestrian symbols such as saddle pouches, horse heads and reins are carved into their ground floors. Their galvanized iron friezes are further decorated with embossed garlands and rosettes. The neighboring building at 165 East 73rd is a Beaux-Arts style building in yellow Roman brick with foliate carvings. The Romanesque house at 166 has a finely detailed corbelled brick cornice with its date of construction, 1883, in cast iron letters below.

Architectural eclecticism arises further down the block's south side. At 168 East 73rd the roofline is broken by the stepped gable, a hallmark of the neo-Flemish Renaissance style unusual in the city and usually not developed to the extent it is at 168 East 73rd. Next door, 170 and 172–74 show signs of the Neo-Grec style with the latter also having some Queen Anne elements. The last building in the carriage house row on the south side, 178 East 73rd, combines Beaux Arts decor with neo-Georgian brickwork.

Some of the carriage houses

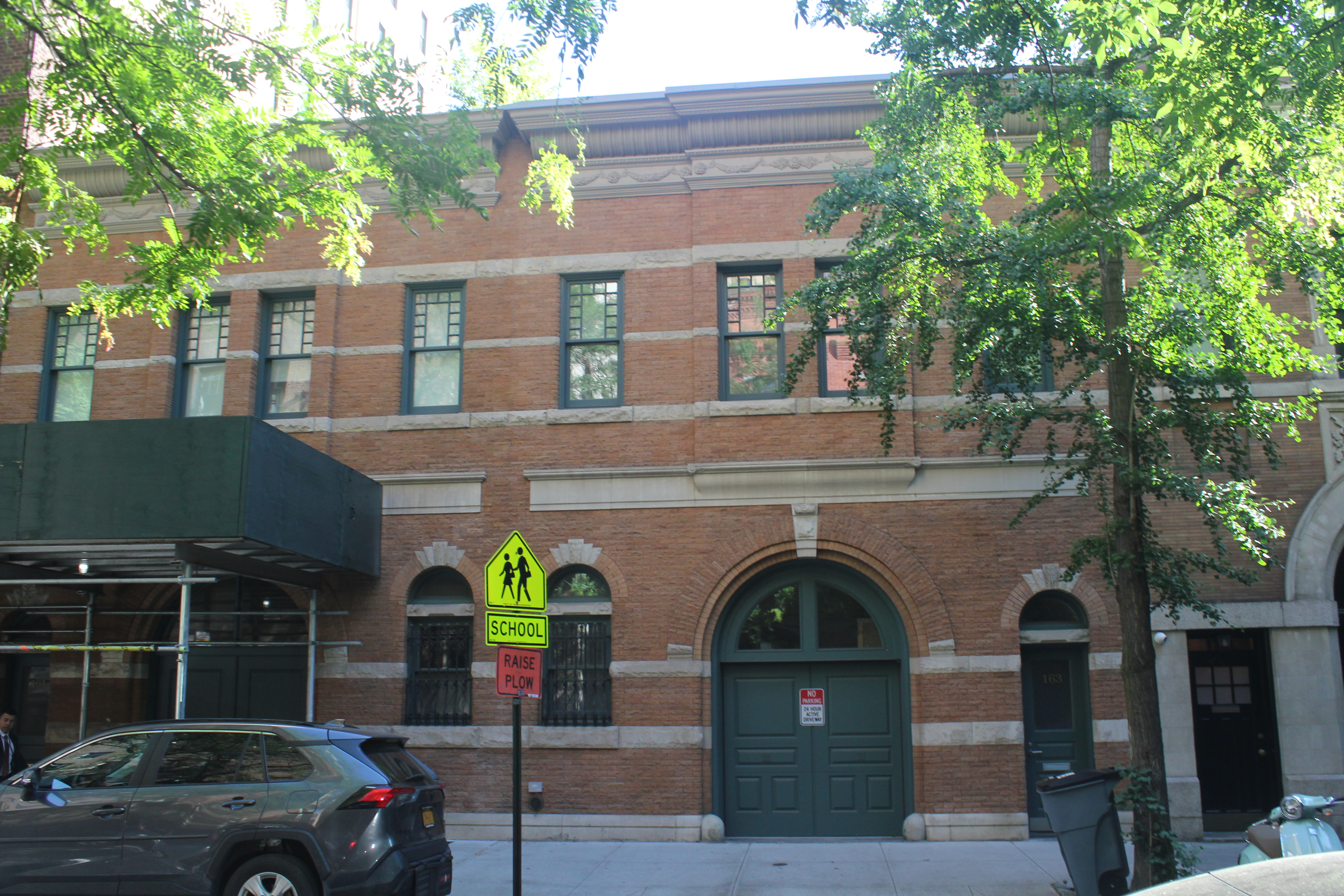
161 and 163 East 73rd Street

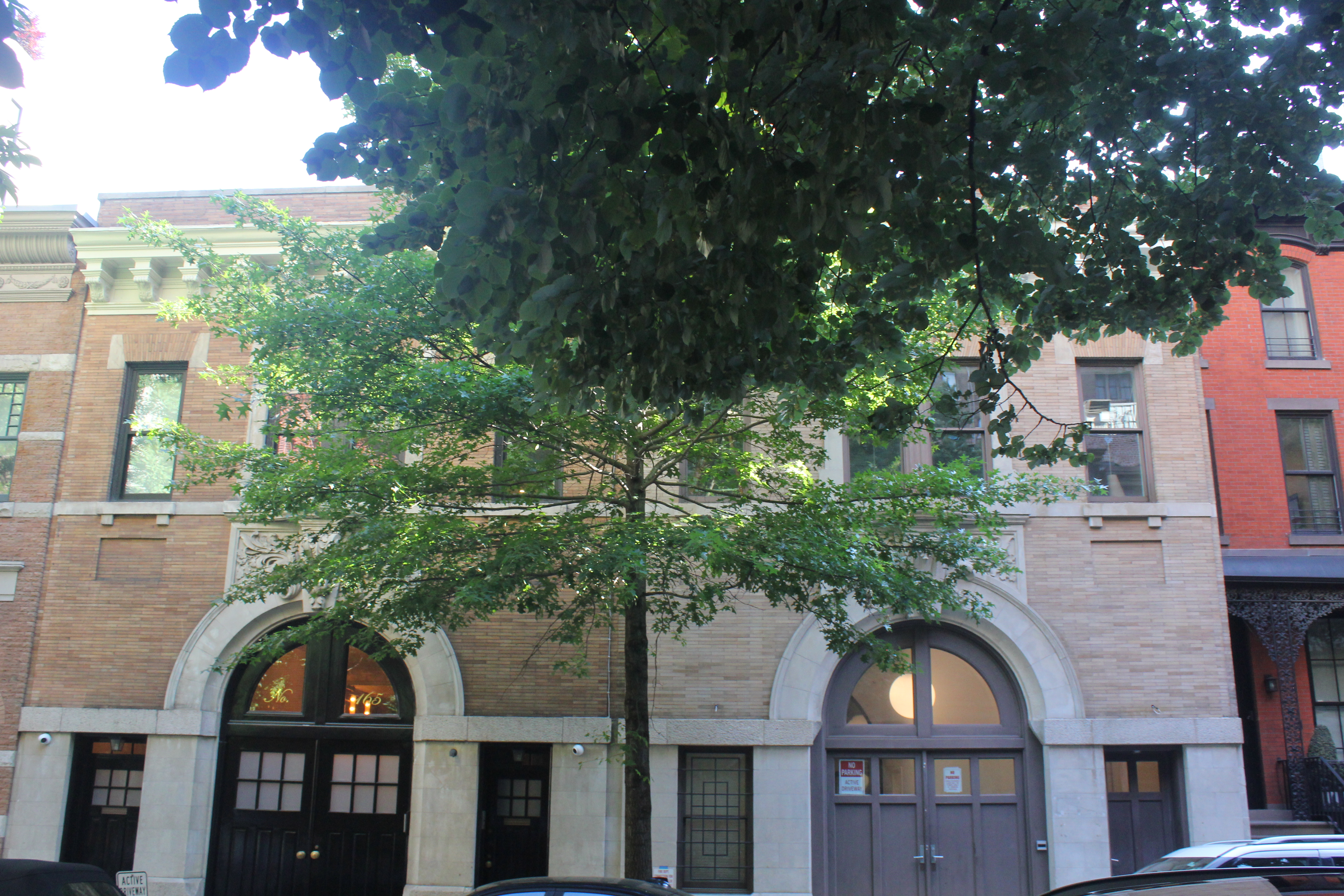
165 and 167 East 73rd Street

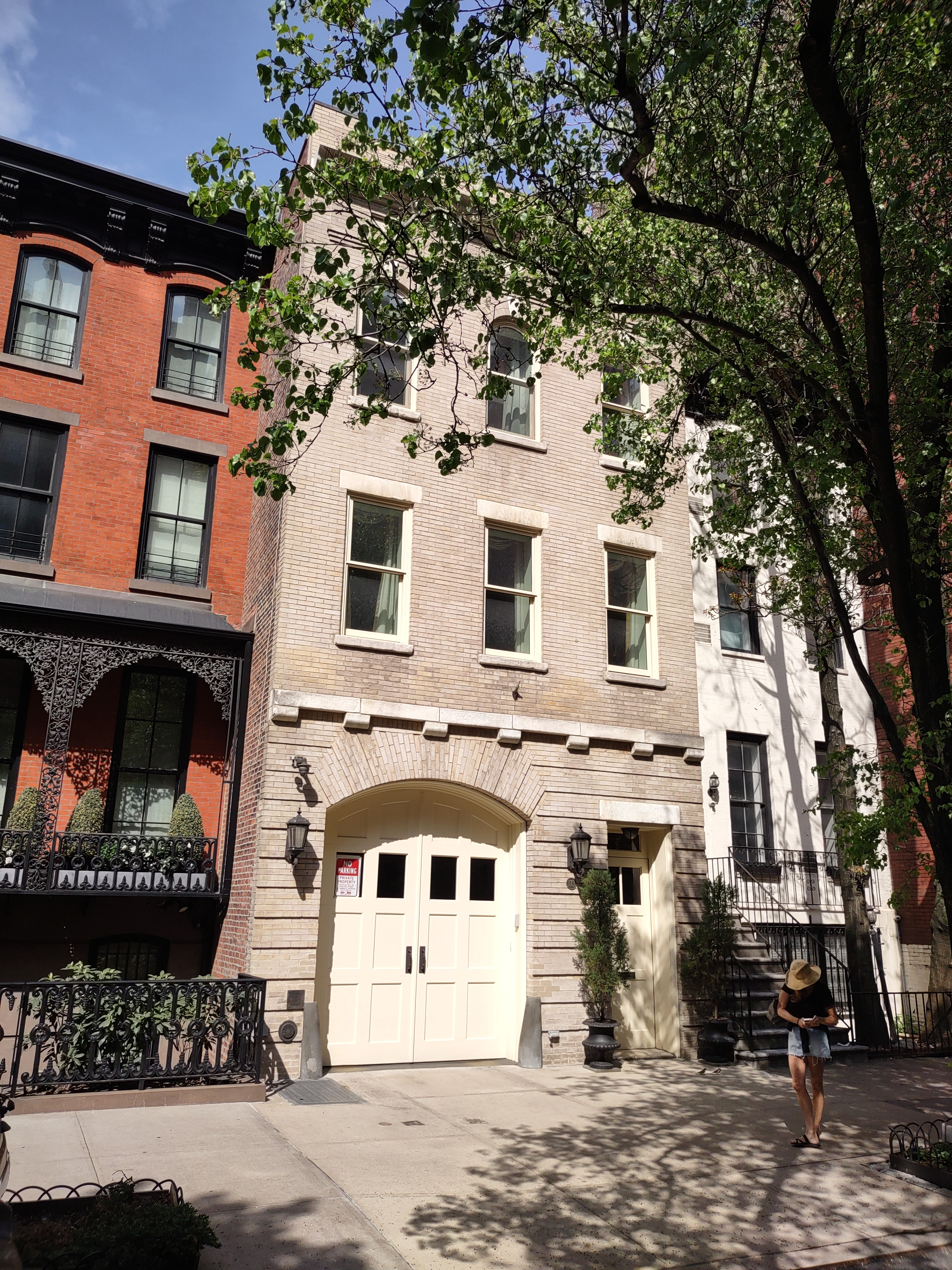
173 East 73rd Street

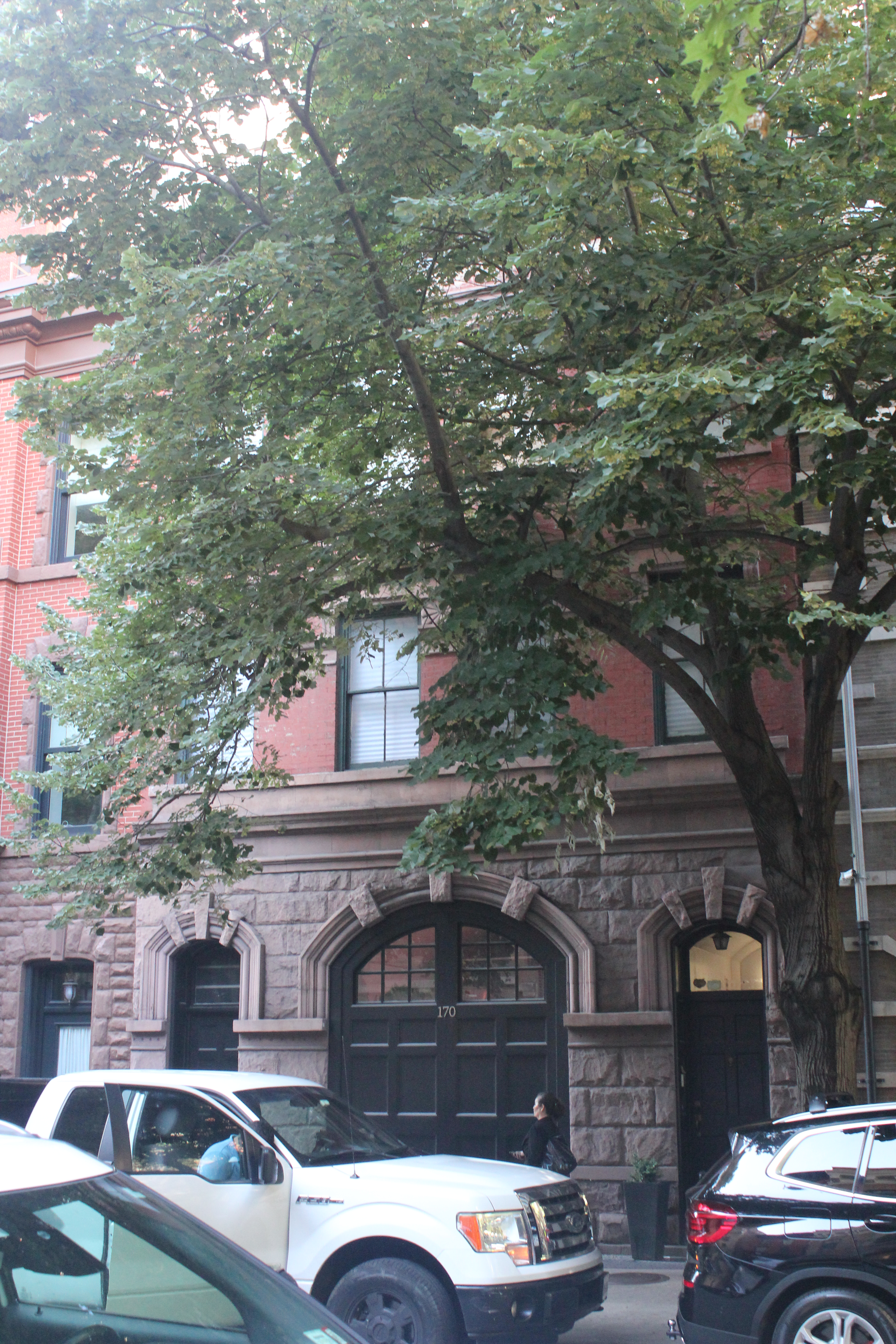
170 East 73rd Street

=== Commercial buildings ===
The commercial buildings

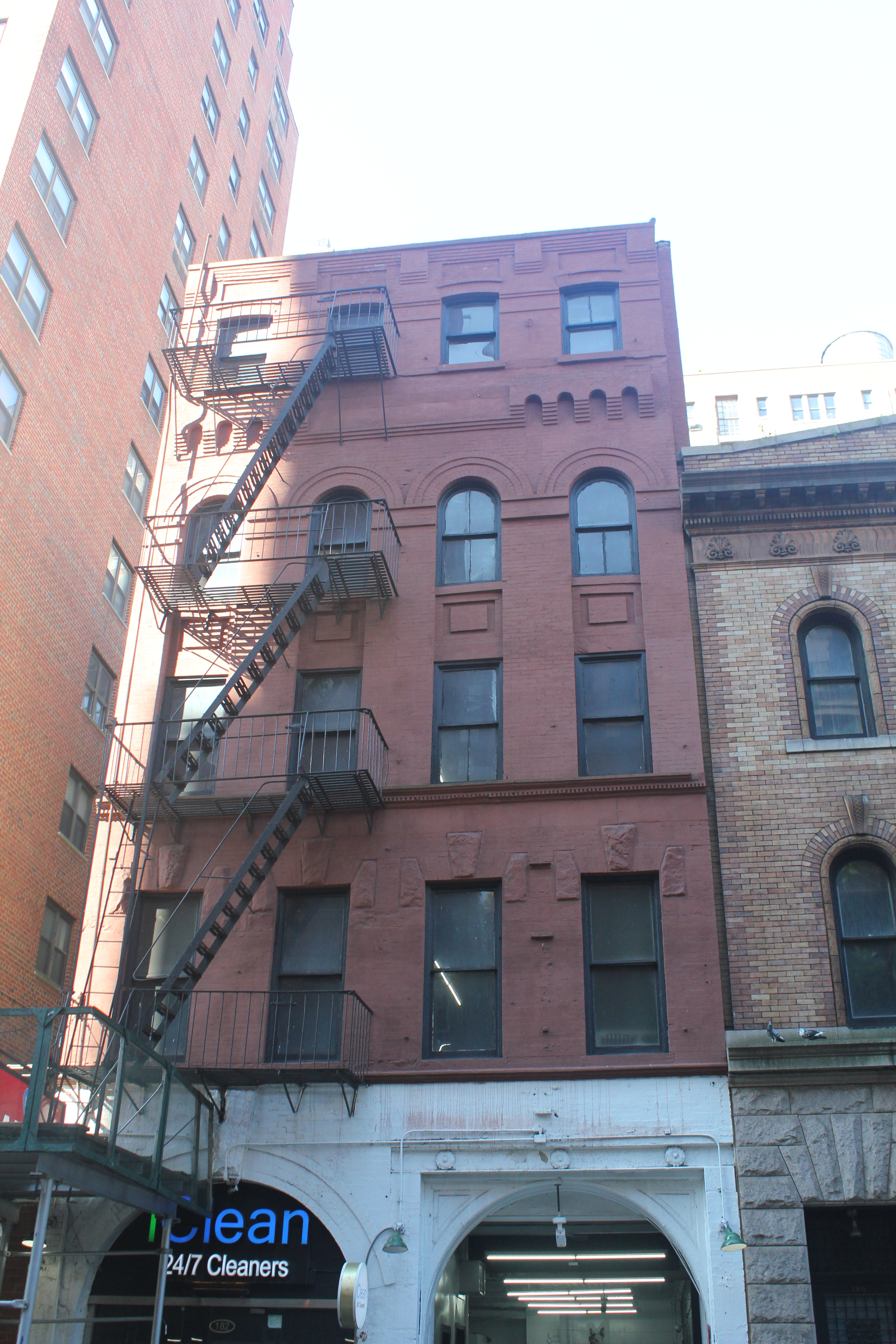
182 East 73rd Street

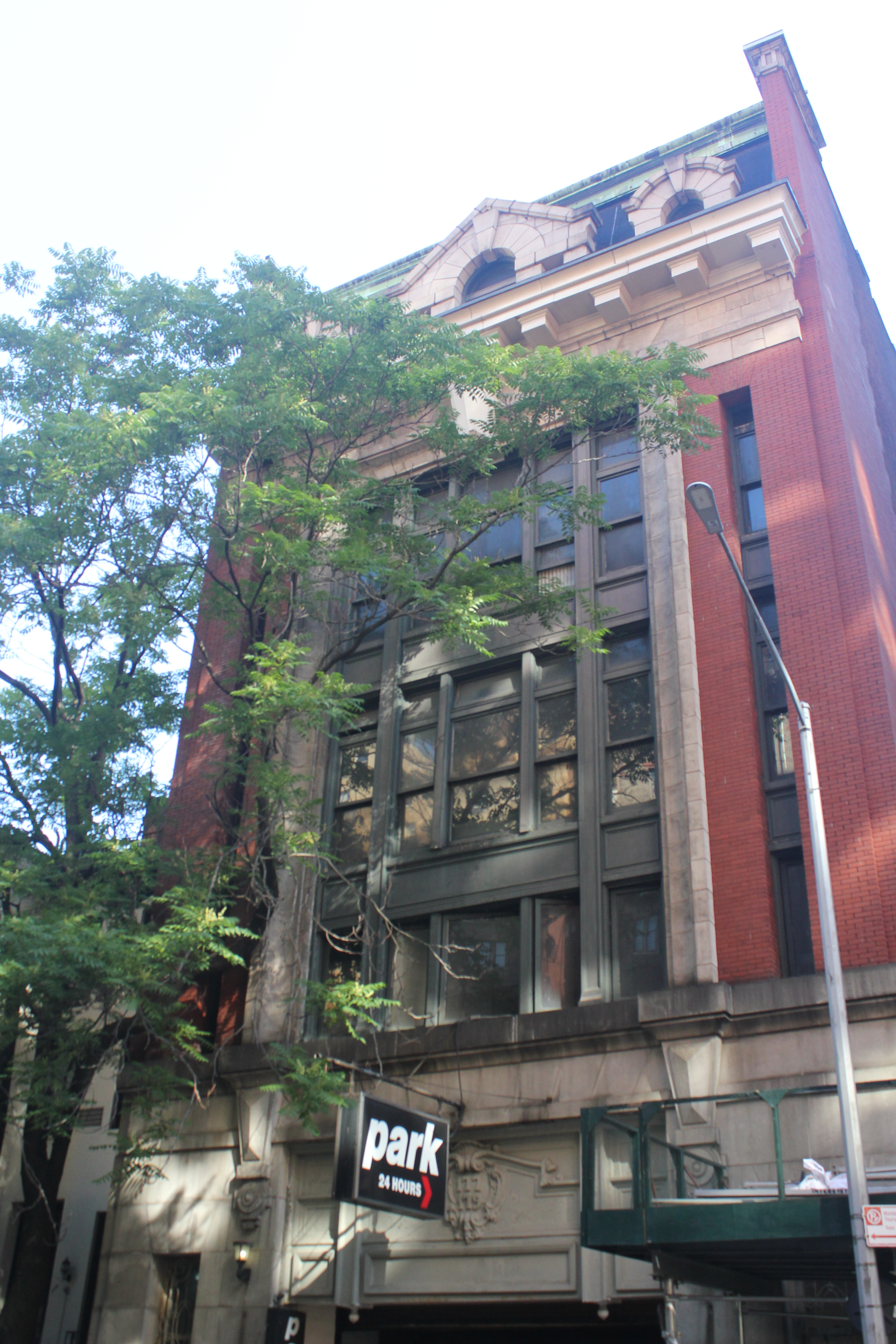
177–179 East 73rd Street

The two commercial buildings, at 177–79 and 182 East 73rd, are the highest on the block at five stories. Both were originally built for paying customers who rented and were not wealthy enough to afford their own separate buildings rather, with 177–79 the only one on the block designed with automobile use in mind. It is a Beaux Arts building on an exposed limestone and granite foundation with the middle stories faced in brick with terra cotta trim. Its upper story is a mansard roof pierced by three unusually large dormer windows with terra cotta enframements. The central dormer takes the form of a triumphal arch with heavy stone blocks. Its overall level of decoration is unusually sophisticated for a utilitarian structure.

Across the street, 182 East 73rd is a brick Romanesque Revival structure with stone trim and cornices separating several of its stories. Above the fourth story "S KAYTON & CO." is inscribed on a corbelled name panel in the middle of a round-arched cornice. Many of the windows are set in arches themselves.

== See also ==
- List of New York City Designated Landmarks in Manhattan from 59th to 110th Streets
- National Register of Historic Places listings in Manhattan from 59th to 110th Streets
