= Ronuel Greenidge =

Guyanese chess player (born 1983)

Ronuel Egbert Greenidge
Personal information
- Born: 29 March 1983 (age 43) Georgetown, Guyana

Chess career
- Country: Guyana
- Title: Candidate Master (2014)
- Peak rating: 1830 (March 2024)

Ronuel Egbert Greenidge is a Guyanese chess player. He has competed at several Guyana National Chess Championships and in 2008 defeated Errol Tiwari but was eventually defeated by the champion Kriskal Persaud on a tie breaker.
