= Indians in Barbados =

Total population
- 3,000

Regions with significant populations
- Bridgetown

Languages
- English, Bajan, Bengali, Gujarati, Hindi-Urdu, Caribbean Hindustani, Tamil, Telugu, Sindhi, Kutchi

Religion
- Islam, Hinduism, Christianity

Related ethnic groups
- Non-resident Indian and person of Indian origin, Indo-Caribbean, Indian people

Indo-Barbadian or Indo-Bajan, refers to Barbadians of Indian ancestry from the Indian subcontinent, including present-day Bangladesh and Pakistan. Currently, there is a 3,000-strong Indian community in Barbados.

== History ==
Research has shown that the first known Muslim to arrive in Barbados was over one hundred years ago when in 1913 Abdul Rohul Amin, a silk merchant from West Bengal came to Barbados.

Soon after, some more Bengalis arrived and they shared a house in Wellington Street, in the city. Some of them also lived in Milk Market and Tudor Street (upstairs Bata Shoe Shop) in Bridgetown. Most of these Bengalis married local Barbadian women and started families in Bridgetown. Today many well-known Barbadians are the grandchildren of these unions.

These Muslims started the itinerant trading process, which continues up to this day. In the early stages most of the trading was with poor Barbadians living in the country areas who found it difficult to get to Bridgetown to do their shopping. The traders would take the bus to get their wares to the people in the country. If there were no buses available they would walk long distances just to accommodate the customers. Over the years, these traders built up a relationship with Barbadians, which still remains of mutual benefit.

Following the Bengalis, Muslims from villages in Gujarat, West India arrived. It is reported that the first of the Gujarati Muslims came in 1929. These Muslims had set out for Brazil to cut timber but ended up in Guyana and stayed there for a while. In Guyana they learnt that there was money in coal trading with Barbados. They visited Bridgetown a couple of times by boat and then decided to make Barbados their home.

The Indo-Guyanese and Indo-Trinidadian community in Barbados have introduced Indian dishes such as roti to Barbados.

== Demography ==
There are reports of a growing Indo-Bajan diaspora originating from Guyana, Trinidad and Tobago, and India. Mostly from southern India and other Indian states, Indo-Bajans are growing in size but smaller than the equivalent communities in Trinidad and Tobago, Jamaica and Guyana. Hinduism is one of Barbados' growing religions.

== Notable people ==
- Avinash Persaud, Barbados-born British business executive of Indo-Trinidadian and Indo-Guyanese descent
- Sir Lionel Alfred Luckhoo KCMG, CBE, Q.C. Barbados' first High Commissioner to London from (1967–1970).

== See also ==
- Barbados § Demographics
- Indo-Caribbeans
- Barbados–India relations
