= Prasat =

Prasat (Khmer: ប្រាសាទ, Thai: ปราสาท) is a Khmer and Thai term meaning "castle", "palace", or "temple" (derived from the Sanskrit prāsāda / प्रासाद). It may refer to:

- Prasat, towers in Khmer architecture
- Prasat (Thai architecture), a royal or religious building form in Thai architecture
- Prasat, Preah Netr Preah, a khum (commune) of Preah Netr Preah District, Banteay Meanchey Province, Cambodia
- Prasat District, Surin Province, Thailand

== See also ==
- Prasad (disambiguation)
