= Barbados–India relations =

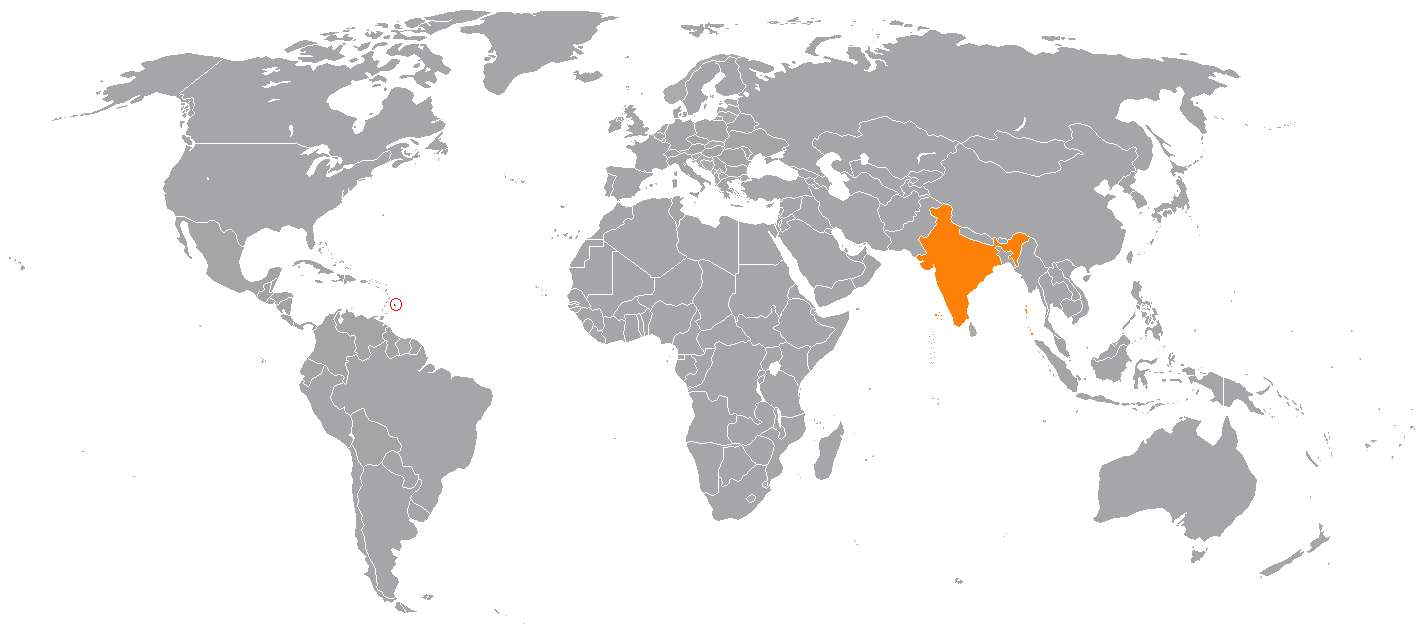
- Barbados: India

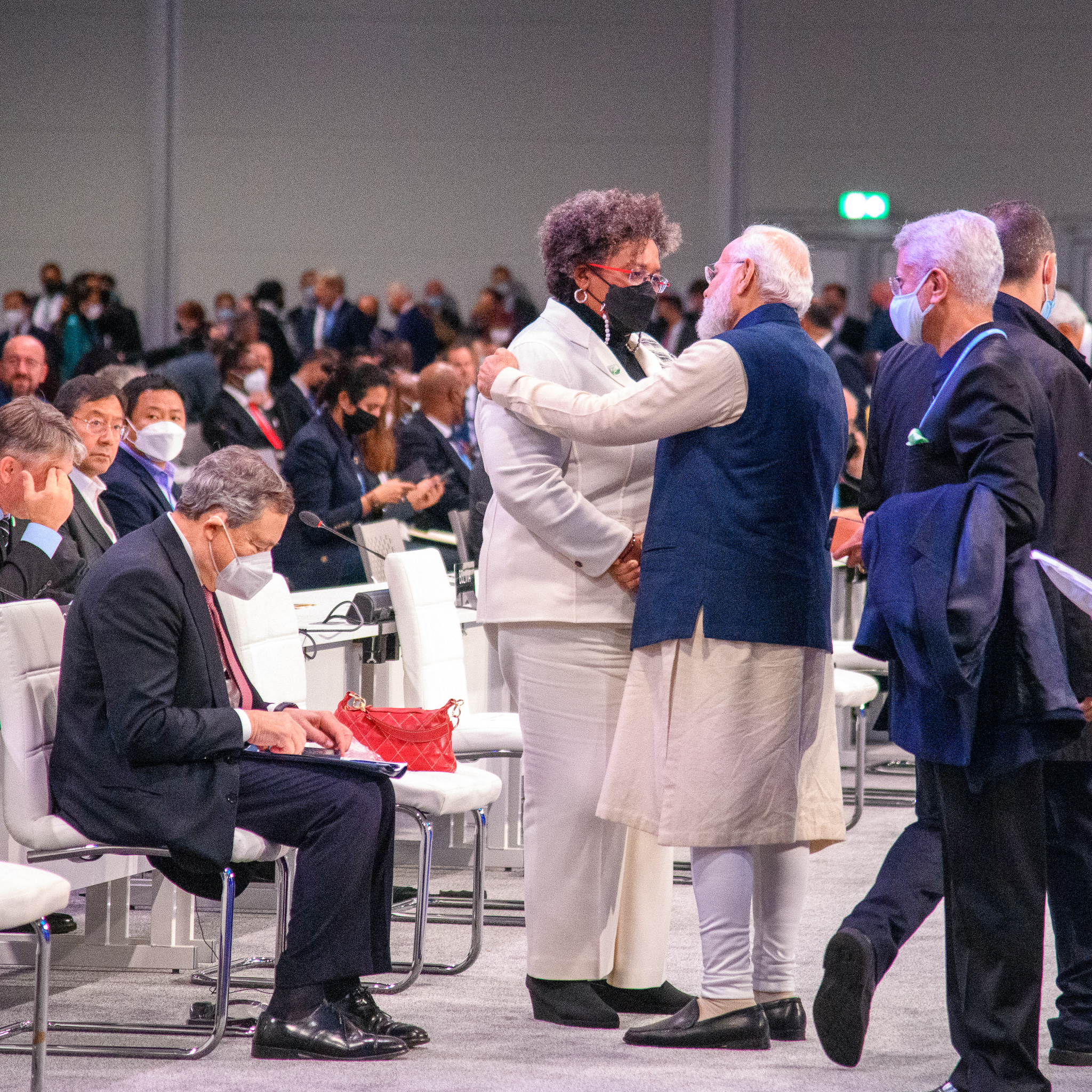
Indian Prime Minister Narendra Modi meeting Barbadian Prime Minister Mia Mottley at COP26 in Glasgow, Scotland; November 2021

Barbados–India relations are the international relations that exist between Barbados and India. The Embassy of India in Paramaribo, Suriname is concurrently accredited to Barbados. India also maintains an Honorary Consulate in Holetown.

== History ==
Many Indians from Gujarat, Bengal and Sindh emigrated to Barbados in the early 20th century. According to historian Sabir Nakhuda, the first Indian to arrive in Barbados was Beshart Ali Dewan. Dewan who hailed from the present-day state of West Bengal emigrated to Barbados in 1910.

Diplomatic relations between Barbados and India were established on 30 November 1966, the date the former became an independent country. On the same day, India gifted a throne that was placed in the Barbadian House of Assembly.

An Indian delegation visited Barbados to attend the CARICOM Summit in July 1996. Barbados supported the G-4 resolution on expanding the UN Security Council in 2007. The country also voted for India's candidature for Non-Permanent seat on the UN Security Council in 2011–12, and supports India's candidature for a permanent seat on the Security Council.

Barbadian Minister of Foreign Affairs Billie A. Miller has visited India on numerous occasions to participate in various international conferences. Minister of State for External Affairs Digvijay Singh visited Barbados in June 2003 and held talks with Deputy Prime Minister and Attorney General Mia Mottley, and Senior Minister and Foreign Minister Billie Miller. During the visit, the two countries signed an MoU agreeing to hold regular Foreign Office Consultations. Finance Minister P. Chidambaram visited Barbados in September 2005 to participate in the Commonwealth Finance Ministers' Meeting.

The first-ever Foreign Office Consultation (FOC) between Barbados and India was held in Bridgetown from 28 April to 1 May 2015. Special Secretary (AMS & CPV) in the Ministry of External Affairs R. Swaminathan and Permanent Secretary in the Ministry of Foreign Affairs and Foreign Trade Simone Rudder led the Indian and Barbadian delegations at the FOC. Swaminathan also held bilateral talks with Minister of foreign Affairs and Foreign Trade Maxine McClean, Minister of Industry, International Business, Commerce and Small Business Development Donville Inniss and Health Minister John Boyce.

Barbados and India signed an Air Services Agreement on 6 October 2015. The agreement provides fifth freedom rights and permits Indian and Barbadian airlines to operate direct scheduled flights and chartered flights between the two countries.

In May 2018, P. P. Chaudhary, the Indian government's Minister of State, Law, Justice and Corporate Affairs visited Barbados and discussed the framework of doctors from India working and operating in Barbados as well as the areas of international business and financial services, health care, Double Taxation Agreements (DTA), tax information agreements, Air Services Agreements, and micro, small and medium-sized enterprises (MSMEs).

In 2024 India's Prime Minister, Narendra Modi was conferred with the Order of Freedom of Barbados award by the Barbadian Prime Minister, Mia Mottley.

== Trade ==
Bilateral trade between Barbados and India totaled US$10.67 million in 2015–16, recording a growth of nearly 4% over the previous fiscal. Indian exports to Barbados stood at $10.50 million and imports were $170,000. The main commodities exported by India to Barbados are vehicles, pharmaceuticals, textiles, iron and steel, and organic chemicals. The major commodities imported by India from Barbados are electrical machinery, optical photography cinematographic equipment.

Indian firm Larsen & Toubro was awarded a ₹1.3 crore (US$130,000) contract by the West Indies Cricket Board in February 2005 to serve as the "construction management consultant" on a project to rebuild the Kensington Oval. In August 2005, L&T was awarded a ₹211 crore (US$22 million) contract to carry out the construction work. As part of the upgrade, two stands were renovated and 7 new stands were built raising the stadium's capacity from 13,000 to 26,500. L&T completed the work by January 2007, in time for the 2007 Cricket World Cup.

During the CoVID-2019 pandemic the Indian government allocated aid in the form of 100,000 AstraZeneca vaccines for Barbados which arrived on 9 February 2021. The Barbados Government then allocated approximately 70,000 doses for the Commonwealth of Dominica.

== Cultural relations ==
Cricket is the primary cultural tie between the two countries. The Indian and West Indian cricket teams regularly tour each other's countries. Several Barbadian cricketers such as Carlos Brathwaite, Jason Holder, and Dwayne Smith have played in the Indian Premier League.

Indo-Barbadians or Indo-Bajans are Barbadian nationals of full or partial Indian ancestry. As of 2010, according to Barbados' national census agency, Indo-Barbadians made up 1.3% of the country's population and were the fourth largest ethnic group in country, after blacks (92.4%), mixed-race (3.1)%, and whites (2.7%). Of the nearly 3,000 Indo-Barbadians, almost 2,000 originate from the Surat district of Gujarat. Around 130 Indo-Barbadian families are of Sindhi origin and are primarily involved in business. About 150 Indo-Barbadians are professionals involved in education and medicine, and 30 Indo-Barbadians are enrolled as students at a private medical university. There are also some British Indians and Indo-Trinidadian and Tobagonians who own hotels and other real estate in Barbados.

Nationals between the nations are eligible for scholarships under the Indian Technical and Economic Cooperation Programme.

== See also ==
- Indians in Barbados
- Indo-Caribbeans
