= John Plender =

British journalist

John Plender is a British financial journalist.

John Plender is with the Financial Times where he has been a columnist and a senior editorial writer since 1981. He is also a broadcaster on current affairs for Channel 4 and the BBC. Earlier in his career he was with The Economist.

In 1992, he broke the story of the Church of England's investment losses.

== Books ==
- That’s The Way The Money Goes, with Andre Deutsch, (1982)
- The Square Mile, with Paul Wallace, (Hutchinson, 1984)
- A Stake in the Future, with Nicholas Brealey, 1997)
- Going Off The Rails - Global Capital and the Crisis of Legitimacy, with John Wiley (2003)
- Ethics and Public Finance with Avinash Persaud, (Longtail, 2007)
- Capitalism: Money, Morals, and Markets, (Biteback, 2015)
