= Prasadi (elephant) =

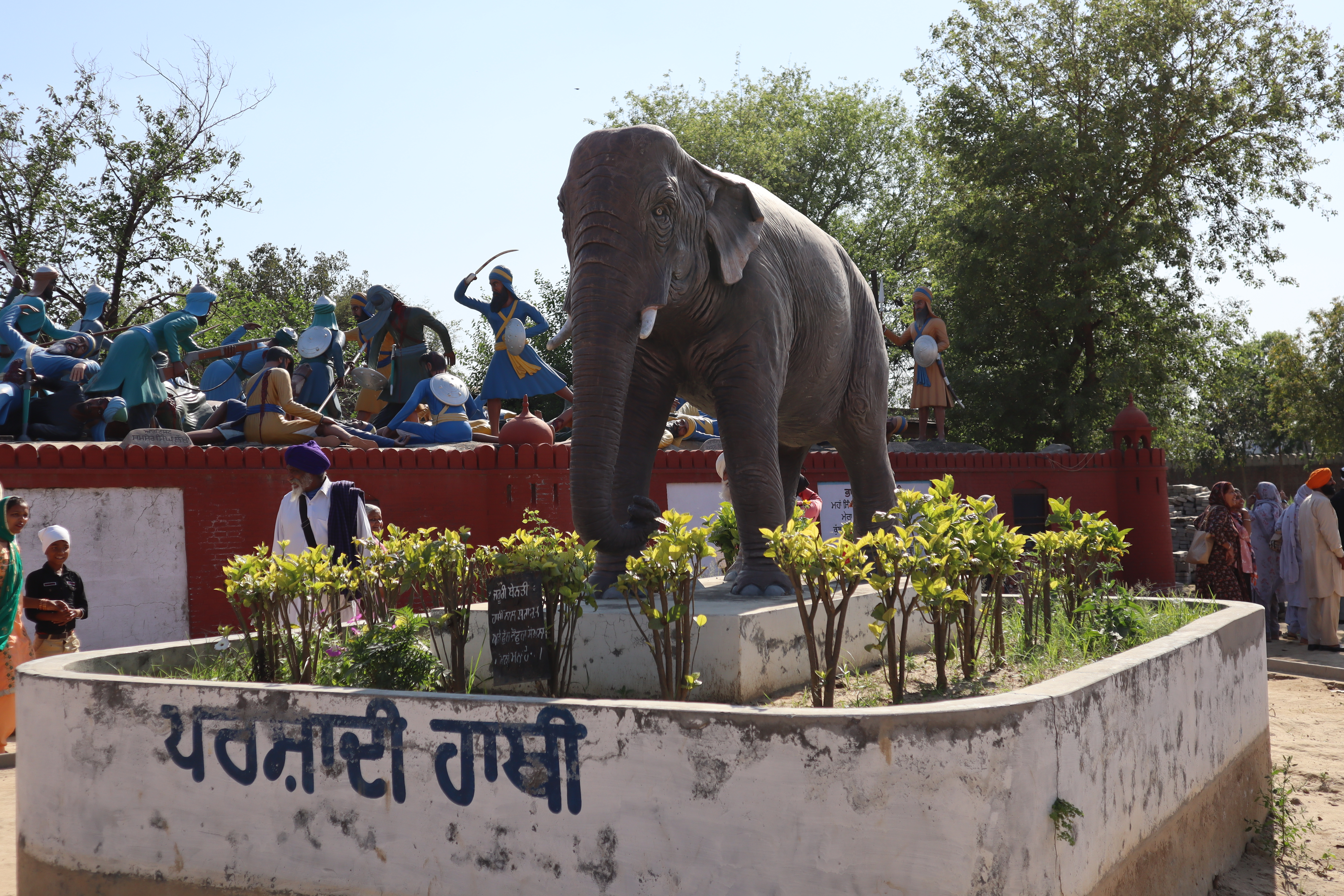
- Sculpture of Prasadi Hathi, Gurdwara Mehdiana Sahib, Mehdiana, Ludhiana district, Punjab, India, 9 April 2023
- Died: 1705; Anandpur
- Cause of death: Mercy killing
- Owner: Guru Gobind Singh

Prasadi, also known as Prasadi Hathi, was an elephant that belonged to Guru Gobind Singh which was celebrated in the Sikh court. The elephant possessed notable white-streaks on certain areas of its body and could perform many tricks.

== History ==
Sikh sources claim that a man named Ram Rai had served Guru Tegh Bahadur whilst he was travelling in Assam in the mid-1660's. Ram Rai, whom was childless, would eventually be blessed by the Sikh guru. After the blessing of Guru Tegh Bahadur, Ram Rai had a son named Ratan Rai (also known as Rattan Chand), who would become a zamindar of Assam. When Ratan Rai became an adult, he learnt that Guru Tegh Bahadur had been succeeded by his son, Guru Gobind Singh. Wishing to see the guru, Ratan Rai travelled to Anandpur to pay tribute to the Sikh guru. Ratan Rai came bearing gifts to bestow to the Sikh guru, these gifts included a young and trained elephant, five horses whom belonged to a rare breed, and a five-in-one weapon (a contraption that contained a pistol, sword, lance, dagger, and a club). Other gifts included a special throne, a drinking cup, and jewels. Thus, the young elephant was gifted to Guru Gobind Singh by the Assamese chief. Sikh accounts claim the Assamese chief requested that Guru Gobind Singh never let go of possessing the elephant.

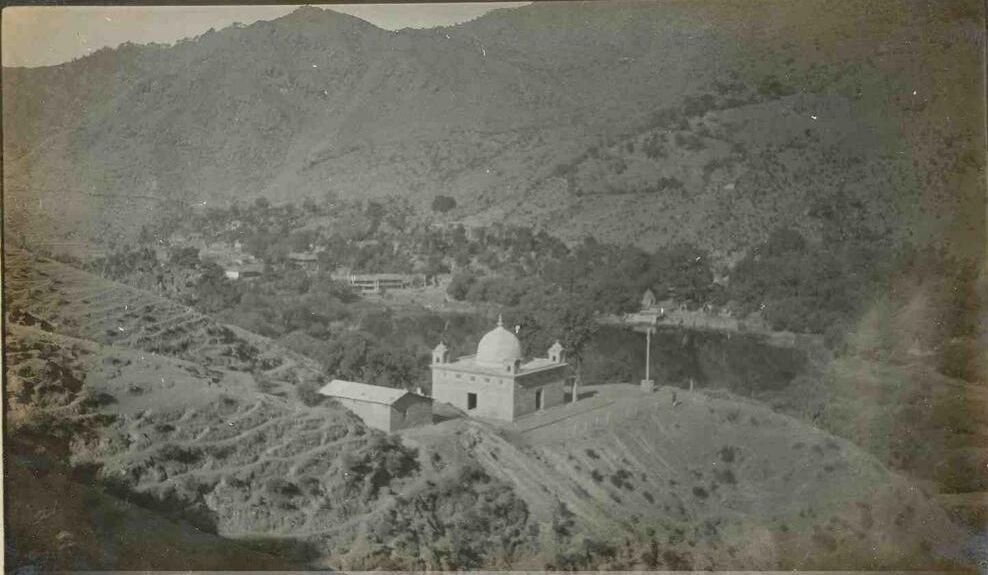
Photograph of Gurdwara Rewalsar Sahib, by Dhanna Singh 'Patialvi', 1934. According to legend, the guru was gifted the elephant at this location.

Kavi Santokh Singh's Suraj Prakash narrates that Guru Gobind Singh named the young elephant Prasadi. Prasadi had distinguishing characteristics, its head bore a round, white mark (like a tilak) and there were white-streaks running along its trunk and back. Prasadi also knew tricks, such as saluting the guru, washing the guru's feet, applying a saffron mark on the guru's forehead, waving a fly-whisk or fan (chaur sahib) over the guru, escort the guru at night whilst holding a torch in its trunk, and it also could retrieve arrows that had been fired by the guru.

Fame of the elephant grew in the Punjabi Hills region and the raja of Kahlur State, Bhim Chand, drew jealous of the guru's possession of such a well-trained beast, after witnessing the animal during a visit to the guru. Whilst visiting the guru, Prasadi, elaborately decorated, was displayed before Bhim Chand, who was seated under an expensive Kabuli tent that had been gifted by Duni Chand, a Sikh from Afghanistan. Bhim Chand attempted to obtain the elephant through scheming, by requesting the guru lend him the elephant for the purpose of displaying it during his son's, Ajmer Chand, wedding. According to Kesar Singh Chibber's account of the events, the Sikh guru replied that Prasadi was originally a gift and gifts should not be loaned-out. The Sikh guru was aware that this was a ploy of Bhim Chand in-order to gain permanent possession of Prasadi. After his non-military attempts at taking possession of the elephant failed, Bhim Chand eventually launched a military attack on the guru at Anandpur over the matter of the elephant. Bhim Chand's attack failed to gain possession of Prasadi.

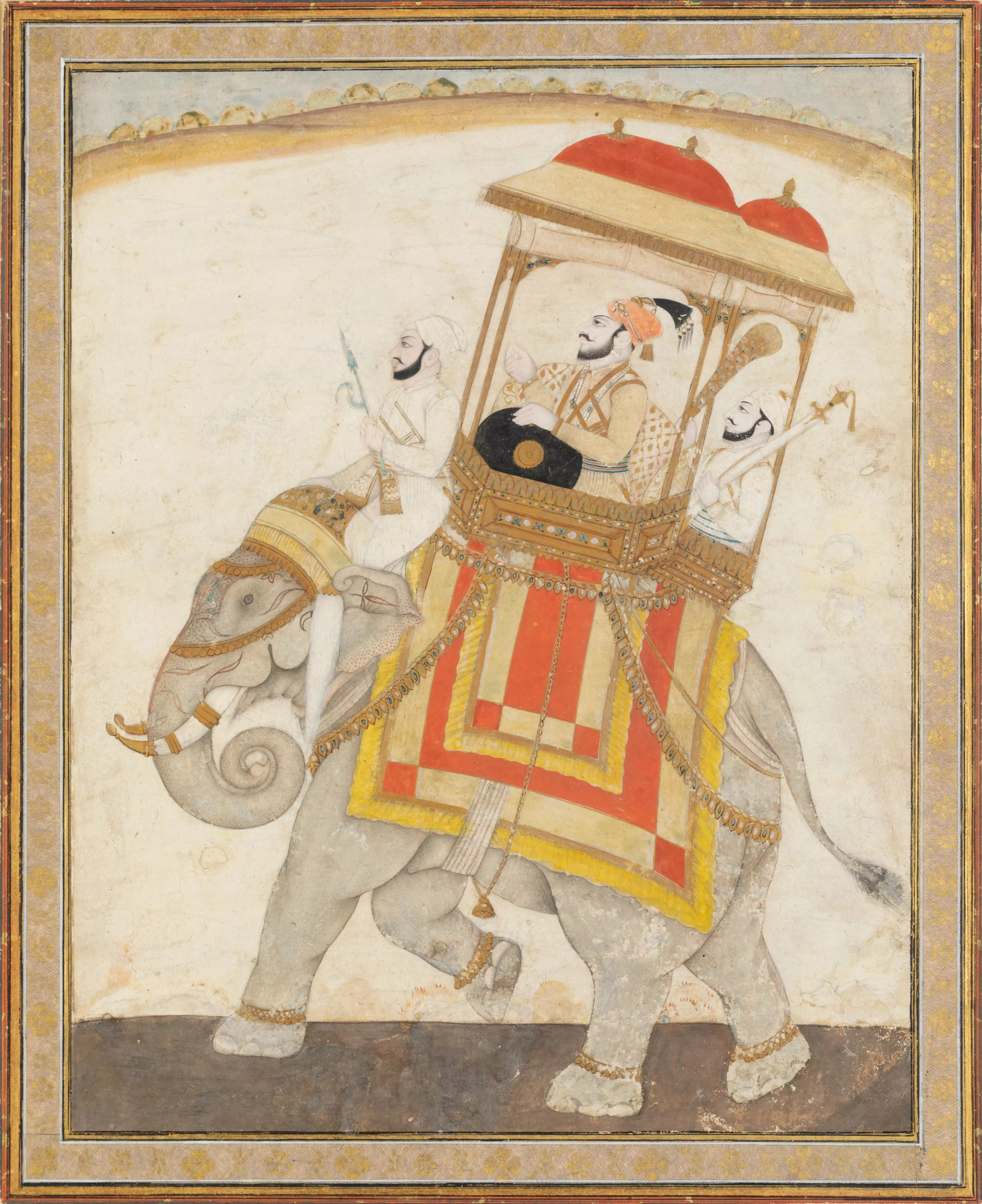
Painting of Guru Gobind Singh and Sahibzada Ajit Singh mounted atop of an elephant, circa late 17th to early 18th century

Guru Gobind Singh utilized Prasadi in his battles. However, Prasadi was not the only elephant possessed by the Sikh guru, another elephant had been donated by the local Sikh congregants (sangat) of Dhaka to the guru.

According to the Gurbilas Dasvin Patshahi by Sukha Singh, Prasadi became emaciated during the 1705 siege of Anandpur and eventually was killed by the Sikhs on the order of the guru to end the animal's suffering. Some sources claim that the drunken elephant slain by Bachittar Singh at Lohgarh Fort was Prasadi.

== Popular culture ==
Vir Singh's 1925 work, Sri Guru Kalgidhar Chamatkar, contains the tale of Prasadi, describing the elephant as "jet black animal whose forehead was white like ivory".
