= The Prasada =

Apartment building in Manhattan, New York

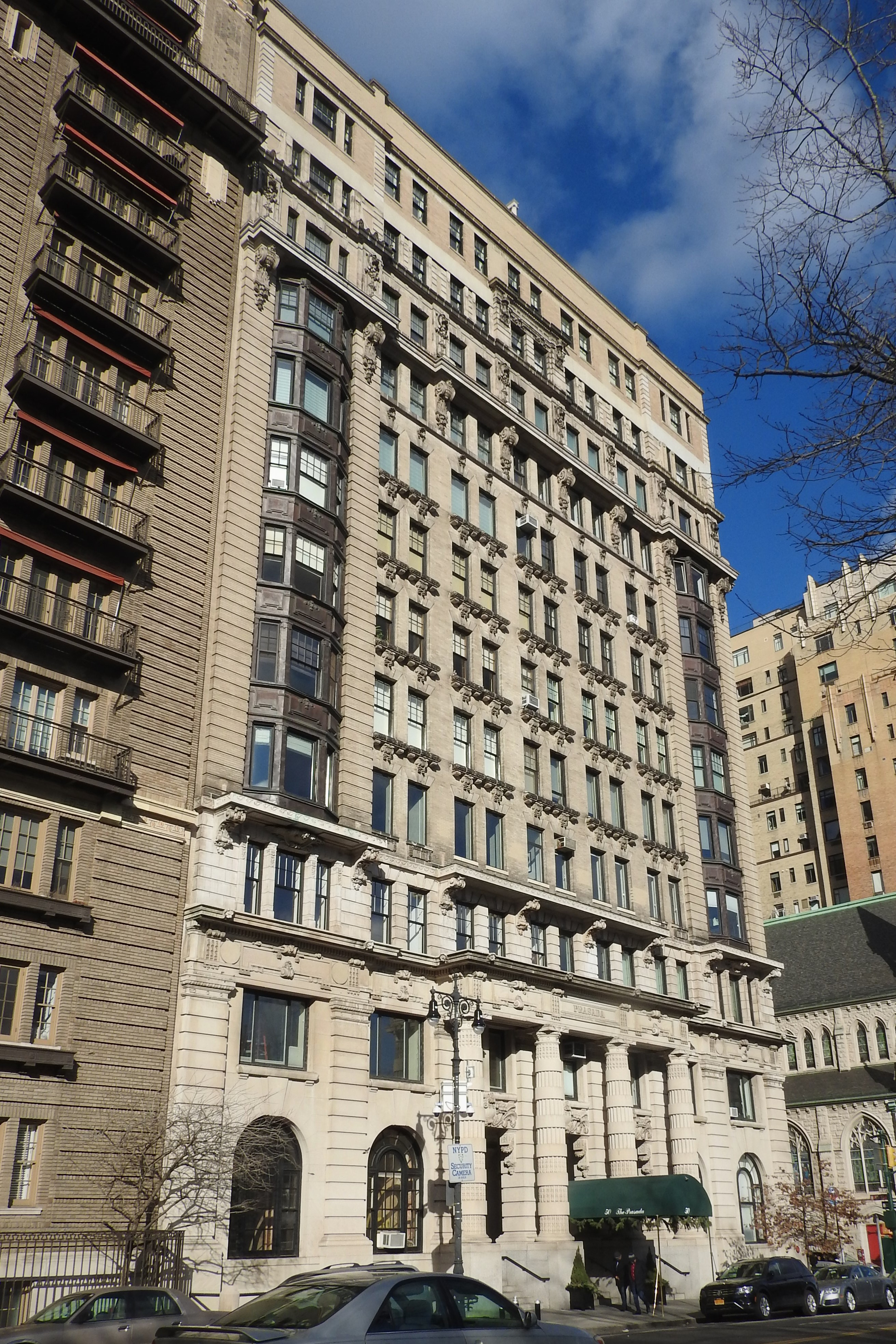
- Interactive map of the The Prasada area

General information
- Type: Housing cooperative
- Location: 50 Central Park West, Manhattan, New York, U.S.
- Coordinates: 40°46′18″N 73°58′46″W
- Completed: 1907

Technical details
- Floor count: 12

Design and construction
- Architecture firm: Charles W. Romeyn
- Developer: Samuel B. Haines

The Prasada is a luxury apartment house at 50 Central Park West on the Upper West Side of Manhattan in New York City.

== History ==
Built between 1904 and 1907, The Prasada is a contributing building in the Central Park West Historic District. It cost $250,000 (the equivalent of more than $7 million in 2022). Originally, it contained three luxury apartments per floor: an eight-room apartment at the rear and two ten-room apartments facing Central Park in the front. Servants' bedrooms, bathrooms, kitchens, and other rooms were located facing the court.

The building became a co-op in 1973.

In 2014, Jon Stryker sold his Prasada penthouse for $42 million. Antonio Banderas owned an apartment in the building from 2005 to 2018.

== Description ==
The building surrounds an open court, with stained-glass skylights illuminating the lobby.

The structure is a bold essay in the French Second Empire style and was one of three that established Central Park West as an avenue of tall apartment blocks, in this case of twelve storeys.

Extensive alterations in 1919 removed the mansard roof that was a prominent feature when viewed from the park and provided more modern facilities.

Residents and guests enter through a recessed portico supported by four two-story banded pillars styled as Roman Doric columns. A dry moat separates the ground floor from pedestrian passers-by.

== In popular culture ==
The building was featured in the movies The Fan, Three Men and a Baby, and Lord of War.
