= Caribbean Policy Research Institute =

Jamaica-based think tank

- Abbreviation: CAPRI
- Formation: c2006
- Type: Non-profit organization
- Purpose: Promotes evidence-based policy dialogue within Caribbean societies.
- Location: The University of the West Indies (Mona), Kingston 7, Jamaica
- Coordinates: 18.016385°N 76.766072°W
- Website: capricaribbean.org

CaPRI, 29 Munro Road, Kingston 6, Jamaica

The Caribbean Policy Research Institute (CAPRI) is a public policy think tank based at the University of the West Indies, Mona, Kingston, Jamaica. The think tank's executive director is Dr. Damien King, Jamaican economist and lecturer in economics at the University of the West Indies, Mona.

== Operation ==
The institute publishes research in the areas of Economics, Governance, Sustainability and Social Issues. Recommendations from CAPRI's studies are shared with the public via large forums, and with policy-makers and influencers in Jamaica and other Caribbean countries. CAPRI puts strong emphasis on advocating for the evidence-based policy recommendations it puts forward.
