= R. Prasad =

Indian cartoonist

- Born: 17 March 1966 (age 60); Pala, Kottayam, Kerala, India
- Education: Bachelor of Arts
- Occupation: Cartoonist

R. Prasad (born 17 March 1966) is an Indian cartoonist associated with Delhi-based Mail Today daily. Since Mail Today is a joint venture between India Today group and Daily Mail, Prasad's works appear in these publications.

R Prasad was born on 17 March 1966 at Pala, Kottayam in the southern Indian state of Kerala in a Hindu Nair family. He currently lives in Safdarjung Enclave, New Delhi. Prasad's cartoons usually get widely circulated in India for their political insight, humour and irony.

In 2010, Prasad's cartoon, published in Mail Today, likening Australian police to Ku Klux Klan drew condemnation across Australia from police and political leaders.
