= Taffin Khan =

Guyanese chess player (born 1992)

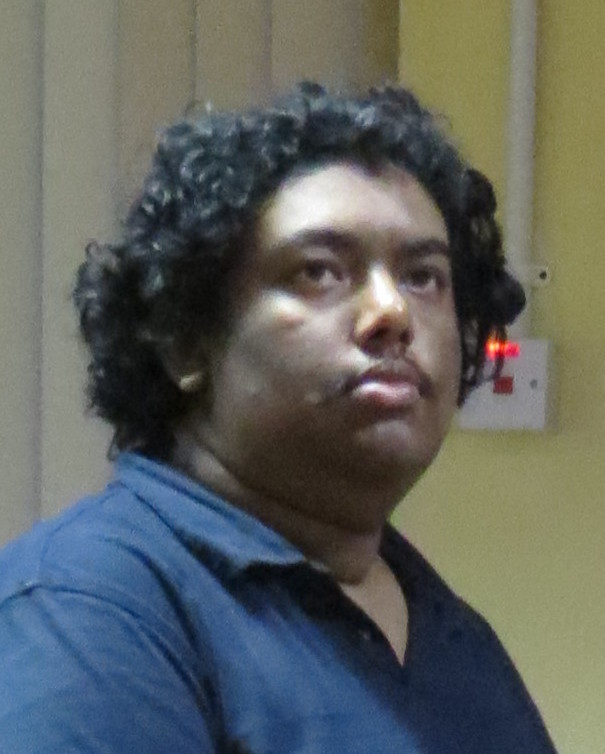

Personal information
- Born: 25 August 1992 (age 33) Georgetown, Guyana

Chess career
- Country: Guyana
- Title: Candidate Master (2016)
- Peak rating: 2066 (July 2024)

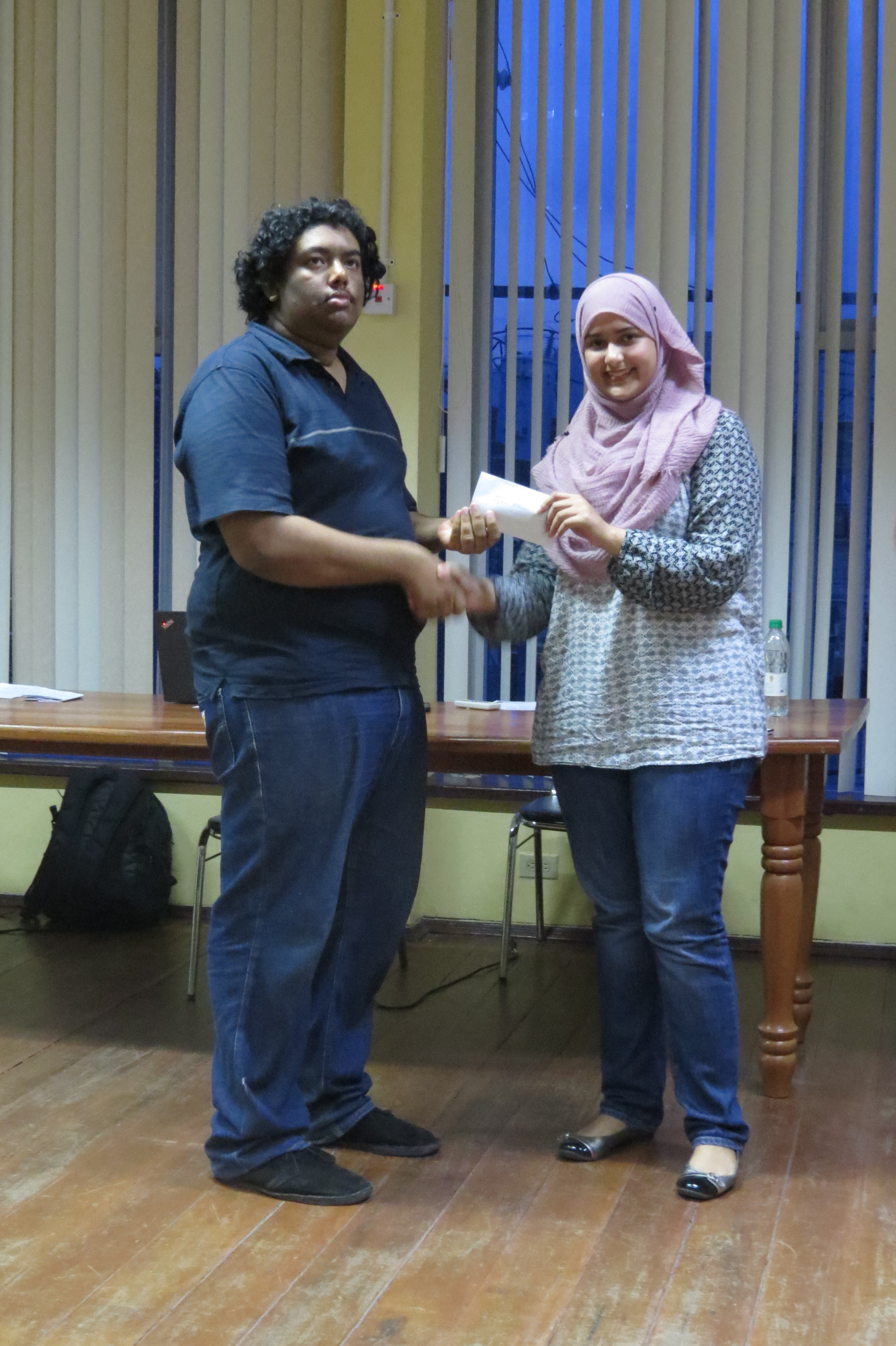
Khan receiving a chess award from Aneesa Maryam Hussain

Taffin Khan is a Guyanese chess player. He has competed at the Guyana National Chess Championships and is the 2008 junior chess champion of Guyana. He has played matches with players such as Kriskal Persaud, Wendell Meusa, Rashad Phoenixx Hussain, Llambi Pasko, Raymond Song, Filip Pancevski, and Carlos A Juarez Flores. On January 9, 2009, Khan was honoured for his victory in the 2008 national chess championship at a prize giving ceremony at Ramphal House in which he received his trophy from the Minister of Culture, Youth and Sport in Guyana, Frank Anthony. Khan has been described by noted Guyanese chess player and head of the Guyana Chess Federation, Errol Tiwari, as, "a person serious about his games, coming from a family of chess players and may have been the reason why he won 14 games and will be moving on to the senior level for the second tournament".
