= Shanta Persaud =

Diabetes researcher and academic

Shanta Jean Persaud is a diabetes researcher and academic. She is professor of diabetes and endocrinology at King's College London, England.

== Career ==
Persaud obtained a BSc degree in physiology and pharmacology and a PhD in the area of islets of langerhans. She started working at King's College London in 1989. Her current research focuses in the area of islet β-cells, receptors in islet function, and insulin secretagogues. According to Scopus, she has published over 198 scientific research documents with 5677 citations, and has an h-index of 45.

== Selected publications ==
- Faria, Alyssa; Persaud, Shanta J (2017). "Cardiac oxidative stress in diabetes: Mechanisms and therapeutic potential". Pharmacology & Therapeutics. 172: 50–62.
- Atanes P., Ruz-Maldonado I., Olaniru O.E., Persaud S.J. (2020). "Assessing Mouse Islet Function". In: King A. (eds) Animal Models of Diabetes. Methods in Molecular Biology, vol 2128. Humana, New York, NY.
- Altaf Al-Romaiyan, Bo Liu, Shanta Persaud, Peter Jones (2020). "A novel Gymnema sylvestre extract protects pancreatic beta-cells from cytokine-induced apoptosis". PHYTOTHERAPY RESEARCH. 34, 1, p. 161-172.
