= Kriskal Persaud =

Guyanese chess player

Personal information
- Born: 1975 (age 50–51) Berbice, Guyana

Chess career
- Country: Guyana
- Peak rating: 1846 (March 2024)

Kriskal Persaud (born 1975 in Berbice) is a Guyanese chess player of Indian descent and one of the country's leading players, he is the current national chess champion of Guyana.

Persaud first came to attention locally as a 12-year-old junior player. In 1988, he was crowned national junior chess champion after participating in the national chess championships. After a break from the game in 1992, when the Guyana Chess Federation's venue got into difficulty, he continued playing. He won the Guyanese national chess championship in 2007 and has defeated players such as Ronuel Greenidge and Taffin Khan.

He retained his title in November–December 2008.

== External links and sources ==
- Kriskal Persaud rating card at FIDE
- Guyanalive.com
- Kaieteur News
