= Bishnodat Persaud =

Guyanese economist

Prof. The Honourable Bishnodat Persaud CHB, Ph.D., FRSA (1933 – 24 July 2016) was a Guyanese economist who served as Alcan Professor of Sustainable Development at the University of the West Indies, and Director of Economic Affairs, Commonwealth Secretariat. In November 2013 he was awarded The Companion of Honour in the Barbados Independence Day Honours List for distinguished national achievement and merit for his outstanding contribution to the regional and international public service.

Persaud spent eighteen years in the service of the Commonwealth Secretariat (1974–1992); for the last eleven, he was Director and Head of the Economic Affairs Division. Before joining the Commonwealth Secretariat, he was Research Fellow at the University of the West Indies (UWI) in Barbados, and served for a period as head of the Eastern Caribbean branch of the Institute of Social and Economic Research in Barbados.

== Biography ==
Persaud was born in Guyana. He gained a first degree in Economics from Queen's University Belfast and a Ph.D. in Agricultural Economics from the University of Reading, UK. He served as external examiner for post-graduate degrees for Universities in the UK and Malta. He was a Fellow of the Royal Society of Arts in the UK. Persaud was the husband of award-winning Caribbean novelist Lakshmi Persaud. They had three sons, psychiatrist Rajendra Persaud, financial economist Professor Avinash Persaud, and Sharda Dean. He died on 24 July 2016 at the age of 82.

== Director of Economic Affairs, Commonwealth Secretariat ==
Persaud served as Director and Head of the Economic Affairs Division from 1982 to 1992. This was the largest technical division of the Secretariat, concerned with trade, finance, commodities and Development. As Head he was Secretary to the annual meetings of Commonwealth Finance Ministers and co-Secretary to the biennial Meeting of Commonwealth Heads of Government Meetings (CHOGM). He headed also the Secretariat support team for over a dozen Commonwealth Expert Groups. While at the Secretariat, he served as chief economic adviser to the Commonwealth Secretary-General, providing technical support at high-level international commissions and committees, including the Brandt Report, by the Independent Commission on International Development Issues, chaired by Willy Brandt in 1980, and South Commissions and the UN Committee on Development Policy, incl. list of previous and current CDP members.

== Professorship at UWI and Director (UWICED) ==
On leaving the Commonwealth Secretariat in 1992, he became Alcan Professor of Sustainable Development at the University of the West Indies. He was the founding Director of the University’s Centre for Sustainable Development. On leaving the University in 1996, he was made an Honorary Professor of the University. He then served as the first Chief Technical Coordinator of the newly established Caribbean Regional Negotiating Machinery.

== Regional and International Missions ==
Persaud sat on many Governmental and Inter-Governmental Commissions of Enquiry, including the Anguilla Commission (the UK and St Kitts-Nevis Governments Commission on the Anguilla Crisis under the chairmanship of Sir Hugh Wooding) the Chancellor’s Commission on the University of Guyana, the Presidential Commission on the University of Guyana, the Commonwealth Commission on Commonwealth Studies, the Belize Sugar Commission of Enquiry, the Grenada Sugar Commission of Enquiry and the UK Government Commission on Wickam’s Caye and Anegada in the British Virgin Islands. He also served on a number of technical investigation teams. In 1998 he was a member of the Advisory Panel to UNDP on that year’s Human Development Report. Earlier in his career in Barbados, he was a member of the Board of the Central Bank and a member of the Committee appointed by the Government to recommend a national severance pay scheme.

For six years (1994–2000), he was a member of the UN Secretary-General’s High-Level Committee on Development Policy (CDP). During this time he was a member of the sub-committee, which advised the UN’s ECOSOC on the classification of states as Least Developed. In 1993 he was appointed a member of the Canadian International Development Agency (CIDA) Review Group on the Organisation of Eastern Caribbean States. In 2006–2010 Prof. Persaud served as a Senior Associate of the Caribbean Regional Negotiating Machinery.

In 1994, the Inter-American Development Bank appointed him joint leader with Mike Faber of the University of Sussex, of a team to prepare a comprehensive report on socio-economic problems of Guyana. In 2000 he served as co-Chair of a UN Expert Group on the Vulnerability of Small States and earlier in 1998 as co-Chair for a similar UN Expert group on vulnerability indices for small island developing States. In 2005 he co-authored a study for the World Bank and the Commonwealth Secretariat on Towards an Outward Oriented Strategy for Small States.

== Boards of Directors ==
Persaud has served on many Boards as Director or Trustee on the Commonwealth Equity Fund, the Barbados Central Bank, the Ramphal Institute, World Aware, Commonwealth Partnership for Technology Management, The Iwokrama International Rain Forest Programme, the UK Universities FSSU, The Jamaica Conservation and Development Trust and The Environmental Foundation of Jamaica.

== Publications ==
He has written a number of articles and reviews in journals, chapters in books and technical reports. He co-edited and co-authored three books, Developing with Foreign Investment with Vince Cable in 1987; Building Consensus for Social and Economic Reconstruction in Guyana, IDB 1994 with Mike Faber et al.; and Economic Policy and the Environment: the Caribbean Experience UWI, 1995 with Mark Griffith.
