= Avinash Persaud =

Barbadian entrepreneur and academic (born 1966)

Avinash D. Persaud
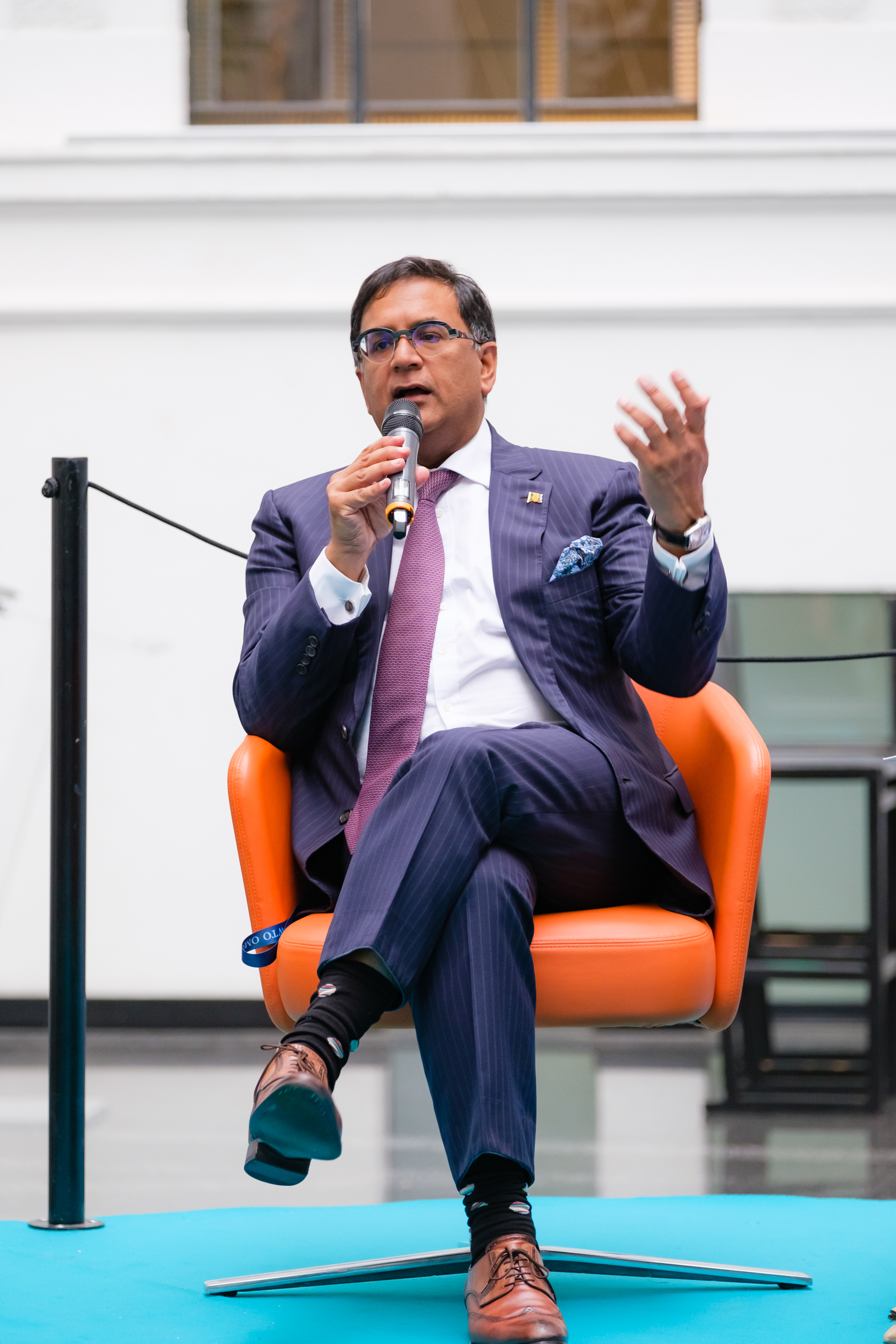
- Born: 22 June 1966 (age 59); Saint James, Barbados
- Occupation: Businessman
- Parents: Bishnodat Persaud (father); Lakshmi Persaud (mother)
- Relatives: Raj Persaud (brother)

Avinash D. Persaud (born 22 June 1966) is a Barbadian entrepreneur and academic who is emeritus Professor of Gresham College in the UK. He was the Chairman of Intelligence Capital Ltd., a company specializing in analyzing, managing and creating financial liquidity in investment projects and portfolios. He was also the non-Executive Chairman of the London-based Elara Capital, an investment bank. Persaud was a Non-resident Senior Fellow of the Peterson Institute of International Economics, Executive Fellow of London Business School and Senior Fellow with the Caribbean Policy Research Institute and Head of its Barbados office.

He was previously managing director and Global Head of Research at State Street Bank, the world's largest institutional investor, (1999–2003) and Global Head of Currency and Commodity Research at J.P. Morgan & Co.(1993–1999). He was ranked within the top 3 of currency analysts in major international investor surveys, (e.g. Institutional Investor and Global Finance) between 1992 and 1999. In December 2009, he was listed by a high level Panel set up by Prospect magazine, second of 25 world brains who have been the best contributors in the public conversation on the financial crisis (Prospect, December 2009).

Persaud was Chairman of the Financial Services Commission of Barbados (2018-2021). He was co-chair of the OECD Emerging Market Network. He was a Director of the Global Association of Risk Professionals (2002–2009) (GARP). In 2008 he was appointed member of a French Presidential Commission on the global credit crunch. He was the economic expert on the UK Government's Advisory Panel on Public Sector Information, (2005–2009) (APPSI). In 2001 he was made a Distinguished Visitor of the Republic of Singapore. He was appointed a visiting scholar at the International Monetary Fund (IMF) (2001–2002) working on risk appetite measures and a visiting researcher at the European Central Bank (ECB) (2005) working on issues of liquidity and transparency in European financial markets. He is frequently a guest speaker at G20 central banks and meetings of officials.

In December 2008, he was appointed a Member of the UN Commission of Experts on International Financial Reform.

In January 2009, he was appointed Chairman of the Second Warwick Commission.

In October 2009, he was appointed an Expert Member of HMT's Audit and Risk Committee.

He held the Mercer's School Memorial Chair in Commerce at Gresham College (2002–2005) and was subsequently elected a Fellow of Gresham College (2005–2008) and emeritus Professor of Gresham College (2007-). He is an elected member of the Council of the Royal Economic Society (2006–2010). He is a Governor and Member of the Council of the London School of Economics (2004–2008) and served on its Investments and Audit committees. He is a visiting fellow at the Centre for Financial Analysis and Policy, at the Judge Institute, University of Cambridge and is a Member of the Scientific Committee of the International Centre for Money and Banking Reports on the World Economy (Geneva, Switzerland).

Persaud has published widely in academic and professional journals including International Finance, Oxford Review of Economic Policy, Central Banking and the Financial Regulator, and his work has appeared in the financial press including The Economist and BusinessWeek. He has authored a dozen "Op Ed" pieces for the Financial Times. He co-authored with John Plender Ethics and Public Finance, published by Longtail (2007) and edited Liquidity Black Holes, published by Risk Books, 2005.

Persaud has won a number of prizes and awards in finance, including First Prize, Jacques de Larosiere Award from the Institute of International Finance (2000) and a Bronze, Amex Bank Award in 1994. He is known for creating a number of practical ideas and tools in finance including the EMU Calculator (1997), the Risk Appetite Index (1996) and the idea that market-sensitive risk management systems can create liquidity black holes in financial markets.

Persaud is actively involved in education and poverty related charities. He is Deputy Chair of the Overseas Development Institute, He is a Member of the Finance Committee of Coram Family. He is a patron of the Bishnodat Persaud Scholarship and a former trustee of the Nita and Errol Barrow Educational Trust and the Lokahi Foundation.

Persaud is the son of development economist Bishnodat Persaud and novelist Lakshmi Persaud. His elder brother is psychiatrist Raj Persaud and his younger sister is former city Economist Sharda Dean.
