= Prasada Rao =

Prasada Rao or Prasadarao (Telugu: ప్రసాదరావు) is one of the Indian names.

- Akkineni Lakshmi Vara Prasada Rao shortly L. V. Prasad, an Indian film actor, producer and director.
- B. G. Prasada Rao was the third successor of Frank Whittaker as bishop in Medak.
- Nanduri Prasada Rao was a famous freedom fighter.
- Vangapandu Prasada Rao is an Indian poet, lyricist and actor.
