= Charles W. Romeyn =

American architect

The former carriage house at 159 East 69th Street, designed by Charles W. Romeyn in the Queen Anne style

Charles William Romeyn (died February 5, 1942) was a prominent American architect. In partnership with Henry R. Wynne he designed many buildings in New York City. The Prasada (1905-07) on Central Park West is considered to be his most famous work that still stands to this day. He was a member of the Architectural League of New York.
