= Raj Persaud =

English Psychiatrist

Rajendra Persaud
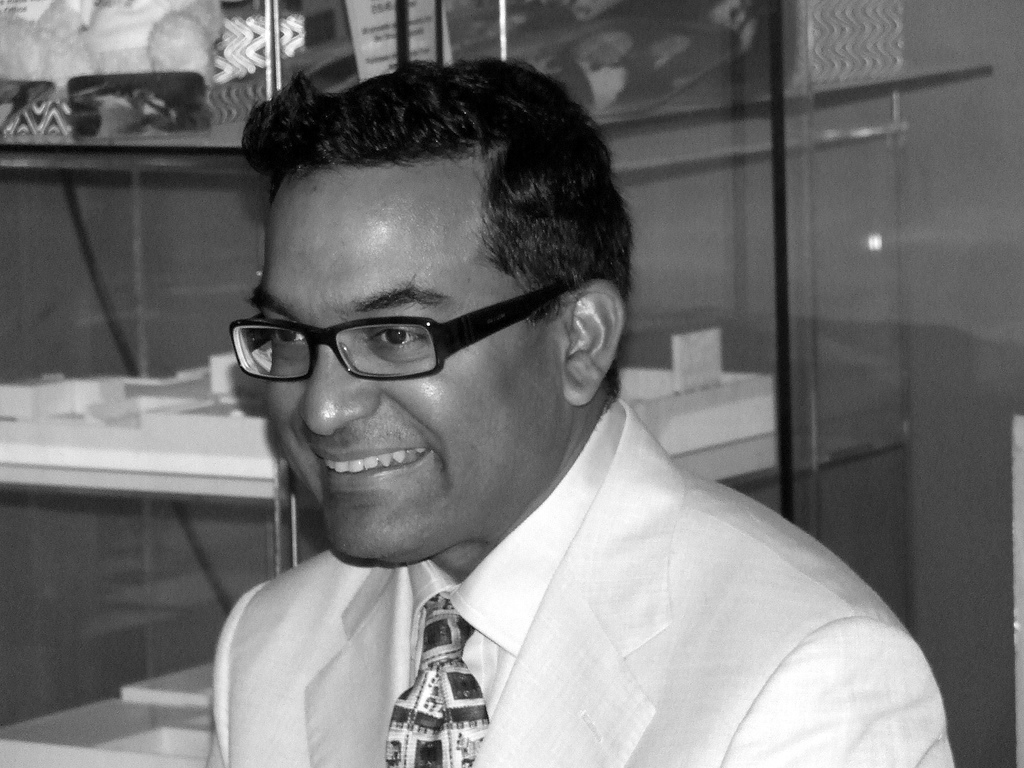
- Persaud in 2007
- Born: 13 May 1963 (age 63); Reading, England
- Education: Haberdashers' Aske's Boys' School
- Alma mater: University College London
- Occupations: Psychiatrist, TV and radio presenter
- Parents: Bishnodat Persaud (father); Lakshmi Persaud (mother)
- Relatives: Avinash Persaud (brother)
- Website: https://drrajpersaud.com/

Rajendra "Raj" Persaud (born 13 May 1963) is a British consultant psychiatrist, broadcaster and author of books about psychiatry. He is known for raising public awareness of psychiatric and mental health issues in the general media, has published five books and received numerous awards.

In October 2008, Persaud resigned from his position as consultant psychiatrist at the South London and Maudsley NHS Foundation Trust.

== Early life and academic career ==
Persaud is the son of Trinidad-born author Lakshmi Persaud and Professor Bishnodat Persaud. He was educated at Haberdashers' Aske's Boys' School and at University College London, where he read for his degrees in medicine and psychology, and wrote for the student newspaper Pi. In his first year at UCL he had to re-sit the examinations in anatomy, which he attributed later to availing himself too freely of the other educational opportunities there. He told the British Medical Journal that this left him "traumatised" and he compensated by virtually taking up residence in the college library, eventually achieving at least three degrees, four diplomas and a membership examination, including:

- BSc Degree in Psychology with First Class Honours, Department of Psychology, University College London (1984)
- MB BS Degree in Medicine, The School of Medicine, University College London (1985)
- DHMSA, Diploma in the History of Medicine, Worshipful Society of Apothecaries (1988)
- Dip Phil (Diploma in Philosophy) Extra-Mural Department, Birkbeck College (1990)
- MRCPsych Membership of Royal College of Psychiatrists (1990)
- MPhil Master of Philosophy, Institute of Psychiatry (1992)
- Dip Hlth Econ, Diploma in Health Economics, Planning and Management, with Distinction, London School of Hygiene and Tropical Medicine (1993)
- MSc Social Research Methods and Statistics, City University London (1995)

He was a psychiatric trainee at the Bethlem Royal Hospital and Maudsley Hospital in London, a research scholar and post-doctoral fellow at Johns Hopkins Hospital in the US in 1990 and a research worker at the Institute of Neurology at UCL. In 2000 he was awarded a UCL Fellowship, and in 2005 he was made a Fellow of the Royal College of Psychiatrists. He is also a Fellow of the Worshipful Society of Apothecaries. In 2002 he was voted one of the top ten psychiatrists in the UK by a survey of the Institute of Psychiatry and the Royal College of Psychiatrists, published in the Independent on Sunday newspaper.

He was a senior lecturer in psychiatry at the University of London and had a visiting professor role at Gresham College for Public Understanding of Psychiatry from 2004–2008.

== Plagiarism and suspension ==
In 2008, Persaud was suspended from practising psychiatry for three months by the General Medical Council, having admitted being guilty of nine cases of plagiarism. He subsequently left his consultant position with the South London and Maudsley NHS trust.

His book From the Edge of the Couch contained material plagiarised from four academic articles written by nine authors. Four of his articles also contained plagiarised passages from an article and book by Thomas Blass, The Man Who Shocked the World. The case against him began after a complaint by the Church of Scientology.

== Media career ==
Persaud regularly appeared on radio and TV programmes, as either interviewee or presenter and was resident psychiatrist on the daytime television programme This Morning. In addition to writing regularly for The Daily Telegraph and The Independent, Persaud also had columns in the Times Educational Supplement, Cosmopolitan and Canary Wharf City Life magazine. He is a former presenter of the BBC Radio 4 psychology and psychiatry programme All in the Mind. He was a presenter for Travels of the Mind for BBC World Service. He is the joint editor of the Royal College of Psychiatrists "discover psychiatry podcasts".

Persaud has appeared on talk shows such as Richard and Judy and Good Morning with Anne and Nick, promoting psychiatric treatments for mental health issues. With the general practitioner Mark Porter, he co-presented the live medical talk and phone-in TV programme Doctor, Doctor on Channel Five.

Persaud's media work has earned him a mixed reception. Francis Wheen, then a Guardian columnist, wrote that he is "paid a lot of money for stating the obvious". In contrast, Phil Hammond, a GP and journalist, applauded Persaud for his populist appeal, saying Persaud is a "good media communicator" for the psychiatric industry, albeit lacking the sophistication of the late Anthony Clare.

Persaud has worked in the NGO sector. He is a patron of OCD-UK, a British charity for people affected by obsessive–compulsive disorder (OCD). He also works with ActionAid and visited Bangladesh with the charity.

== Personal life ==
He lives in Central London and is married to Francesca Cordeiro, an eye surgeon of Goan descent who works at Moorfields Eye Hospital. They have a son and daughter.

== Awards ==
- John Jepson Prize, Special Commendation (1986)
- Osler Medal, Worshipful Society of Apothecaries (1991)
- Denis Hill Prize, Bethlem Royal Hospital (1991)
- Young Scientist Award, Biennial International Schizophrenia Workshop, Badgastein, Austria (1992)
- Research Prize and Medal, Royal College of Psychiatrists (1993)
- Fellow of University College London (2000)
- Fellow of the Royal College of Psychiatrists (2005)
- Morris Markowe Prize, Royal College of Psychiatrists (2005)
- Tony Thistlethwaite Award Commendation for Excellence, Medical Journalists' Association (2005)

== Publications ==
- Staying Sane: How to Make your Mind Work for You. September 1997 (Metro). ISBN 1-900512-38-6
- From the Edge of the Couch. March 2003 (Bantam Press). ISBN 0-553-81346-3
- The Motivated Mind. March 2005 (Bantam Press). ISBN 0-553-81345-5
- Simply Irresistible: The Psychology of Seduction – How to Catch and Keep Your Perfect Partner. January 2007 (Bantam Press). ISBN 0-593-05588-8
- The Mind: A User's Guide. July 2007 (Bantam Press). ISBN 0-593-05635-3
