= Lakshmi Persaud =

Trinidadian writer (1937–2024)

Lakshmi Persaud (20 September 1937 – 14 January 2024) was a Trinidad-born, British-based writer who resided in London, England. She was the author of five novels: Butterfly in the Wind (1990), Sastra (1993), For the Love of My Name (2000), Raise the Lanterns High (2004) and Daughters of Empire (2012).

== Personal life ==
Lakshmi Persaud was born on 20 September 1937, in the small village of Streatham Lodge, later called Pasea Village, in what was then still rural Tunapuna, Trinidad. Her forefathers, Hindus from Uttar Pradesh, moved from India to the Caribbean in the 1890s. Both her parents were in the retail business.

Persaud attended the Tunapuna Government Primary School, St. Augustine Girls' High School and St. Joseph’s Convent, Port of Spain.

Persaud left Trinidad in 1957 to study for a B.A. and her Ph.D. at Queen's University Belfast, Northern Ireland and her postgraduate Diploma in Education at University of Reading, United Kingdom. Her doctoral thesis was "The Need for and the Possibilities of Agricultural Diversification in Barbados, West Indies".

Lakshmi Persaud was the wife of the late economist Professor Bishnodat Persaud, with whom she moved to the United Kingdom in 1974. Her three children are psychiatrist Rajendra Persaud, financial economist Professor Avinash Persaud, and economist and author Sharda Dean. She has lived mainly in the UK since the 1970s, with a two-year spell in Jamaica in the 1990s.

On 14 January 2024, Lakshmi died at her home in London after living with dementia since 2017. She was 86. Despite occasional forgetfulness, she retained her strength, wit and sharp intellect to the end.

== Career ==
Persaud taught at various schools in the Caribbean including St. Augustine Girl's High School, Bishop Anstey High School and Tunapuna Hindu School in Trinidad, Queen's College in Guyana, and Harrison College and The St. Michael School in Barbados.

After leaving teaching she became a freelance journalist. Persaud wrote articles on socio-economic concerns for newspapers and magazines for many years. She also read and simultaneously recorded books in Philosophy, Economics and Literature for the Royal National Institute for the Blind in London. She began a new career in the late 1980s writing fiction. Her short story "See Saw Margery Daw" was broadcast by the BBC World Service on Saturday 18 and Sunday 19 November 1995.

== Works ==
Persaud published five novels that have been frequently reviewed and discussed in a number of academic publications.

- Butterfly in the Wind, Leeds, England: Peepal Tree Press, 1990.
- Sastra, Leeds, England: Peepal Tree Press, 1993.
- For the Love of My Name, Leeds, England: Peepal Tree Press, 2000.
- Raise the Lanterns High, London: BlackAmber Publishers, 2004.
  - translated into Italian as Tenete alte le lanterne, Rome: 66thand2nd, 2010.
- Daughters of Empire, Leeds, England: Peepal Tree Press, 2012.

Persaud’s novels deal with the intricacies of Caribbean identity and individual and communal memory.

Her first novel Butterfly in the Wind was published by Peepal Tree Press in 1990, and in it Persaud records the mental conflicts that attending a Catholic school caused for a Hindu girl. The novel deals in an imaginatively autobiographical way with the first 18 years of her life. Persaud records that her reading of Edmund Gosse’s Father and Son: A Study of Two Temperaments and Laurie Lee’s Cider with Rosie were significant influences in writing this book.

It was followed by her second novel, Sastra, which was published in 1993 also by Peepal Tree Press. In one of the episodes, Persaud draws on her tertiary experience. Both novels explore the tensions within Hinduism between the somewhat puritanical, patriarchal forms orthodox Hinduism took in the Trinidad of her childhood and youth and its latent capacity for a sensuous embrace of life.

In October 1994, the Trinidad Guardian published the bestseller list for Caribbean books published abroad. Sastra was placed first on the list and Butterfly in the Wind was fifth.

Following extensive visits to Guyana (the birthplace of her husband), she wrote For the Love of My Name, published by Peepal Tree Press in 2000, a novel which moves far from the more familiar domestic Hindu territory of the earlier two novels. Though the fictional island of Maya draws heavily on the actuality of Guyana from the mid-1960s to the 1980s, it has resonances for states throughout the world where political repression and ethnic conflict have gone hand in hand.

In March 2004, Raise the Lanterns High was published by BlackAmber Publishers and in 2012, Persaud's fifth novel, Daughters of Empire, was published by Peepal Tree Press.

There has been increasing recognition of Lakshmi Persaud’s work by academic institutions. Her novels are being used as texts in Caribbean and post-colonial literature courses in a number of universities and extracts from her novels have been used in English exams in the Caribbean.

== Awards ==
In recognition of her work, Warwick University established a 'Lakshmi Persaud Research Fellowship' at its Centre for Translation and Comparative Cultural Studies.

In 2012, in recognition of the 50th Anniversary of the Independence of Trinidad and Tobago, the National Library and Information System Authority (NALIS) awarded Lakshmi Persaud a Lifetime Literary Award for her significant contribution to the development of Trinidad and Tobago’s Literature.

In October 2013, Persaud was conferred with an Honorary Doctorate, Doctor of Letters (D.Litt.), by The University of the West Indies, St. Augustine, in recognition of her literary contributions.

In March 2020, Persaud was awarded a Chaconia Medal (gold) as part of the National Awards in Trinidad and Tobago. The Chaconia is awarded to “any person who has performed long and meritorious service to Trinidad and Tobago tending to promote the national welfare or strengthen the community spirit”. She received the Chaconia Medal for her work in education and culture.
