= List of Carnegie libraries in the Caribbean =

This is a list of Carnegie libraries in the Caribbean. Although most of Carnegie's philanthropic efforts were aimed at North America and Europe, a handful of libraries are scattered in other areas of the world.

	Community	Country	Image	Date granted	Grant amount	Location	Notes
1	Bridgetown, (St. Michael)	Barbados		Aug 22, 1903	$23,330	Coleridge St.	UNESCO listed main branch of the National Library Service of Barbados
2	Roseau	Dominica		Mar 14, 1905	$7,500		
3	Georgetown	Guyana		Oct 15, 1906	$34,100		
4	San Juan	Puerto Rico		c. 1914	$100,000		Listed on the National Register of Historic Places as Biblioteca Carnegie
5	Castries	Saint Lucia		May 15, 1916	$10,400		
6	Kingstown	Saint Vincent		Oct 15, 1906	$9,825		
7	Carapichaima	Trinidad and Tobago		c. 1919			Now the Indian Caribbean Museum of Trinidad and Tobago
8	San Fernando	Trinidad and Tobago		Sep 25, 1914	$12,200		Site of the 1921 meeting requesting elected representation
Total	—	—	—	—	$197,355	—	—
