= Biblioteca Carnegie =

- U.S. National Register of Historic Places
- U.S. Historic district – Contributing property
- Puerto Rico Historic Sites and Zones
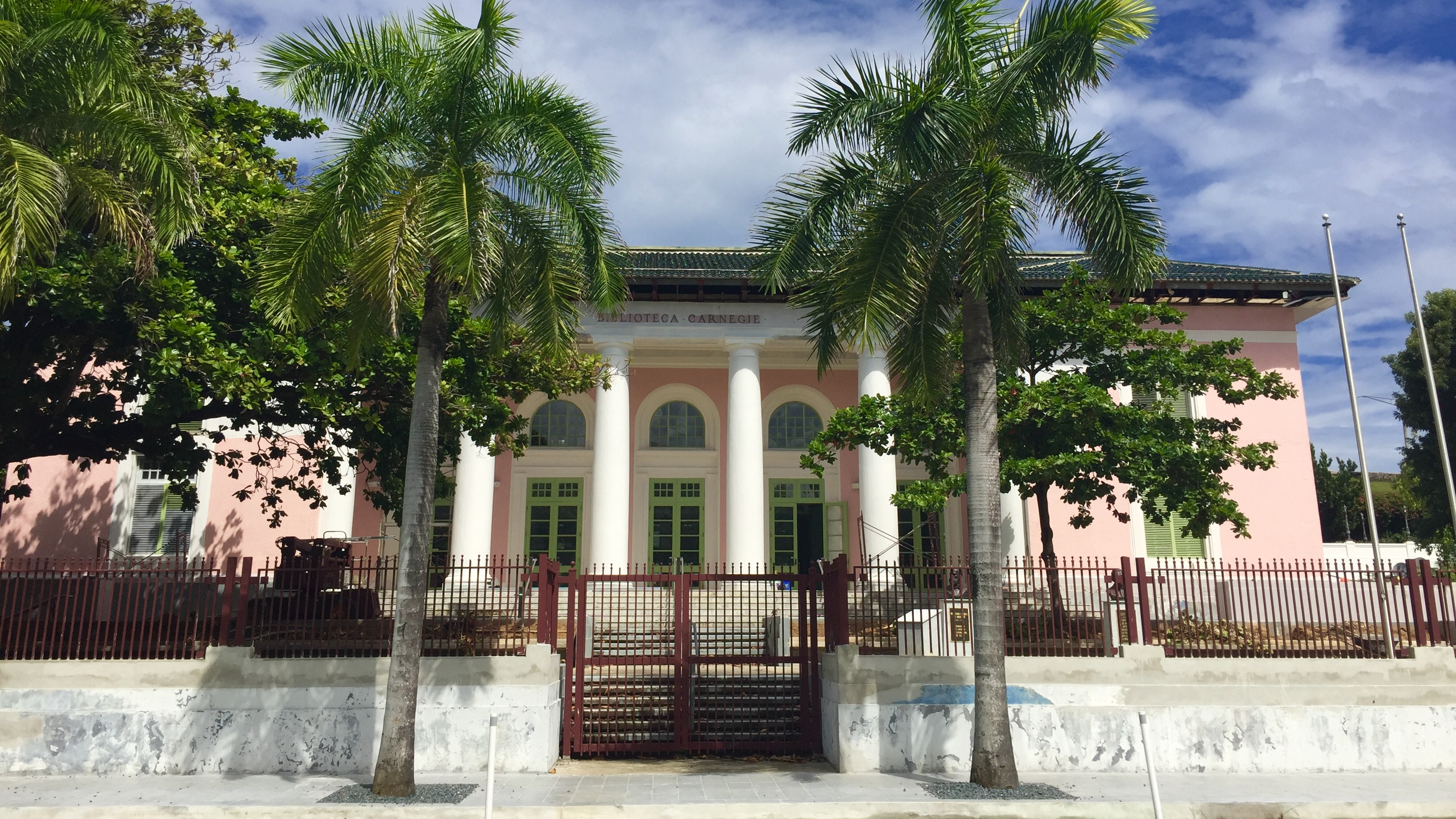

- Location within Puerto Rico
- Location: Ponce de Leon Ave., Puerta de Tierra, Puerto Rico
- Coordinates: 18°28′6″N 66°6′34″W
- Area: 1.1 acres (0.45 ha)
- Built: 1915
- Architect: Henry D. Whitfield (Ramon Carbia, contractor)
- Architectural style: Classical Revival
- Part of: Puerta de Tierra Historic District (ID100002936)
- NRHP reference No.: 83004196
- RNSZH No.: 2000-(RMSJ)-00-JP-SH

Significant dates
- Added to NRHP: October 20, 1983
- Designated CP: October 15, 2019
- Designated RNSZH: February 3, 2000

The Biblioteca Carnegie (or Carnegie Library) on Avenida Juan Ponce de León in Puerta de Tierra, San Juan, Puerto Rico is a NRHP-listed Carnegie library funded through a $100,000 donation from the Carnegie Foundation, becoming Puerto Rico's first purpose-built library when it was completed in 1915.

== History ==
In 1901, then-Education Commissioner, Martin Grove Brumbaugh, initiated talks with Andrew Carnegie with the purpose of building a public library in San Juan, as part of the United States' Puerto Rican education program. For this, the San Juan municipal legislature had agreed to give $6,000 for maintenance expenses. Carnegie's private secretary, James Bertram, indicated that the amount usually donated was 10 times the promised maintenance expenses. Nevertheless, Brumbaugh obtained the $100,000 amount. This was in part due to then-Governor Arthur Yager's friendship with Carnegie himself.

Its origins stem from the Insular Library created in 1903, created by the then-new civil government, which itself came from the military-rule era San Juan Free Library, which was a merger of five pre-existing libraries under Spanish-rule: the library of the Dominican and Franciscan monasteries, the Real Sociedad Económica de Amigos del País, the library of the Provincial Council and Treasury Department of Puerto Rico, the library of the Royal College of Lawyers-General Secretary and the library of the Institute of Secondary Education and Normal School.

It has a Classical Revival stylings and was designed and built by the Puerto Rican engineer Ramón Carbia in 1914, when work on the project commenced on land donated by the Puerto Rico government. In June 1916, the collection of the Insular Library, which had previously been known as the San Juan Public Library, was transferred to the building, and the library, which was named Biblioteca Carnegie, was inaugurated on 27 July, when the Puerto Rican government formally accepted the donation. From 1917 until 2010, the library was administered by the Department of Education. In its first forty years, the library had nine reading rooms, membership, and an average of 200 daily visitors.

Under the 222 Law of 1946 $6,000 was made available to the library's board of trustees with the intention of establishing the Biblioteca Rodante ("Library on Wheels"). The then-Department of Public Instruction was authorized to organize and equip the Biblioteca Rodante, which offered its services via cajas viajeras ("travelling boxes"), which were shelves used to carry books to isolated schools and communities. The project started in 1948 under the direction of Federico Porrata Doría, Francisco Porrata-Doría's brother, with two vehicles carrying books for children and adults, as users ranged from elementary-level school children to adults aged eighty to ninety-years old.

However, in 1965, the library was closed to due the deterioration, which in response Nilita Vientós Gastón, who had served as president of the neighboring Ateneo Puertorriqueño, penned her essay on the library. It was remodelled with some alterations on the floors and reopened in 1969, albeit with a reduced number of visitors, registering 7,000 users that year.

That same year it hosted its first Salón de Humoristas de Puerto Rico ("Puerto Rico Comedian's Hall"), which continued for 22 years, displaying the work of humourists such as Carmelo Filardi, Ramón Arroyo Cisneros, Arturo Yépez, José Ramón Cepero, Ismael Rodríguez, Díaz de Villegas among others. The library received commendations from former-Governor Luis Muñoz Marín, who had recently started his vacation in Rome, writing "Humor is intelligent laughter."

In addition, the library was host to the first meetings of the UNESCO Cultural Center in 1973 and held 36 "UNESCO Chamber Music Concerts" with the likes of Jesús María Sanromá and Héctor Campos Parsi. Ricardo Alegría had talented students from the Escuela de Artes Plásticas y Diseño de Puerto Rico present their "masterpieces" at exhibitions held in the library's exhibition hall on the upper floor. It was also the meeting place for the first meetings and exhibitions of the Academy of Heraldic and Historical Studies and the Theatre Board, then directed by Raulito Carbonell's namesake father.

During the following decades, it closed by season and had its working hours reduced because of a lack of funds. In 1989, the building suffered significant damage due Hurricane Hugo, and the library was closed, leaving San Juan without a public library. In 1991, the Department of Education, "supported by a group of citizens interested in the library, decided to restore the building." The next year, a law was passed which permitted the Department of Education integrate the community by subdelegating the administration of the library to a governmental agency or non-governmental organization. The organization selected was the Biblioteca Carnegie Board of Trustees, reopening in 1995.

In 2010, the San Juan municipal legislature approved an ordinance to accept the library building, possessions and land from the Department of Education, per a Legislative Assembly resolution. Afterward, San Juan mayor Jorge Santini commenced the "total disinterest of the municipality in preserving it"; "community efforts have been made to reopen it without success." After the José Julián Acosta Theater Arts School, located down the street, was declared "partially not apt for use" after the 2019–20 Puerto Rico earthquakes, Mayor Carmen Yulín Cruz announced an agreement with the Department of Education to rehabilitate the library and transfer students temporarily, using 11 classrooms and a recreation area at the library and supplying the use of the Ateneo Puertorriqueño's theatre and the Teatro Tapia, equipment and breakfasts supplied by the municipality, while lunches were the Department's responsibility, as well as Wi-Fi and a radio with direct communication to the municipality's Emergency Management Office and establishing an identification card system for the 182 students and 31 faculty, amounting to a sum of $85,000 investment.

== Description ==
In 1983 the state architect of Puerto Rico wrote "This is a fine Neoclassical, 2-storied building with a rectangular plan." but noted that the building "has not been properly maintained and is in fair condition."

It was listed on the NRHP in 1983 and on the Puerto Rico Register of Historic Sites and Zones in 2000.

== Services ==
Puerto Rico law permits members of the Legislative Assembly, Supreme Court, Court of First Instance and District court judges as well as prosecutors to check out most books for a maximum of thirty days. Among the collection there were books from the collections from three Princes of Wales, three Medieval abbots and Ludwig II. When the library closed after Hurricane Hugo it was open seven days a week, had rooms for references, circulation, magazines, teenagers, children, computer, movies and cultural events, as well as virtual references and night galleries.

The library held alliances with the Pedro Henríquez Ureña National Library as well as Juan Bosch himself, it hosted a camp for children below the poverty line, with meals provided by the Department of Education's school cafeterias. Its bebeteca ("baby's library") hosted children's festival, while it held "la hora del cuento ("story hour") with older children. The teenagers' room had book and computers, prepared for their homework or entertainment. It also hosted computer classes for the elderly, and invited the homeless to use their facilities as well.

== See also ==
- List of Carnegie libraries in the Caribbean
- National Register of Historic Places listings in San Juan, Puerto Rico
