= Parliament Buildings (Barbados) =

Government complex in Bridgetown, Barbados

Coordinates: 13°05′49.15″N 59°36′50.11″W

The Parliament Buildings
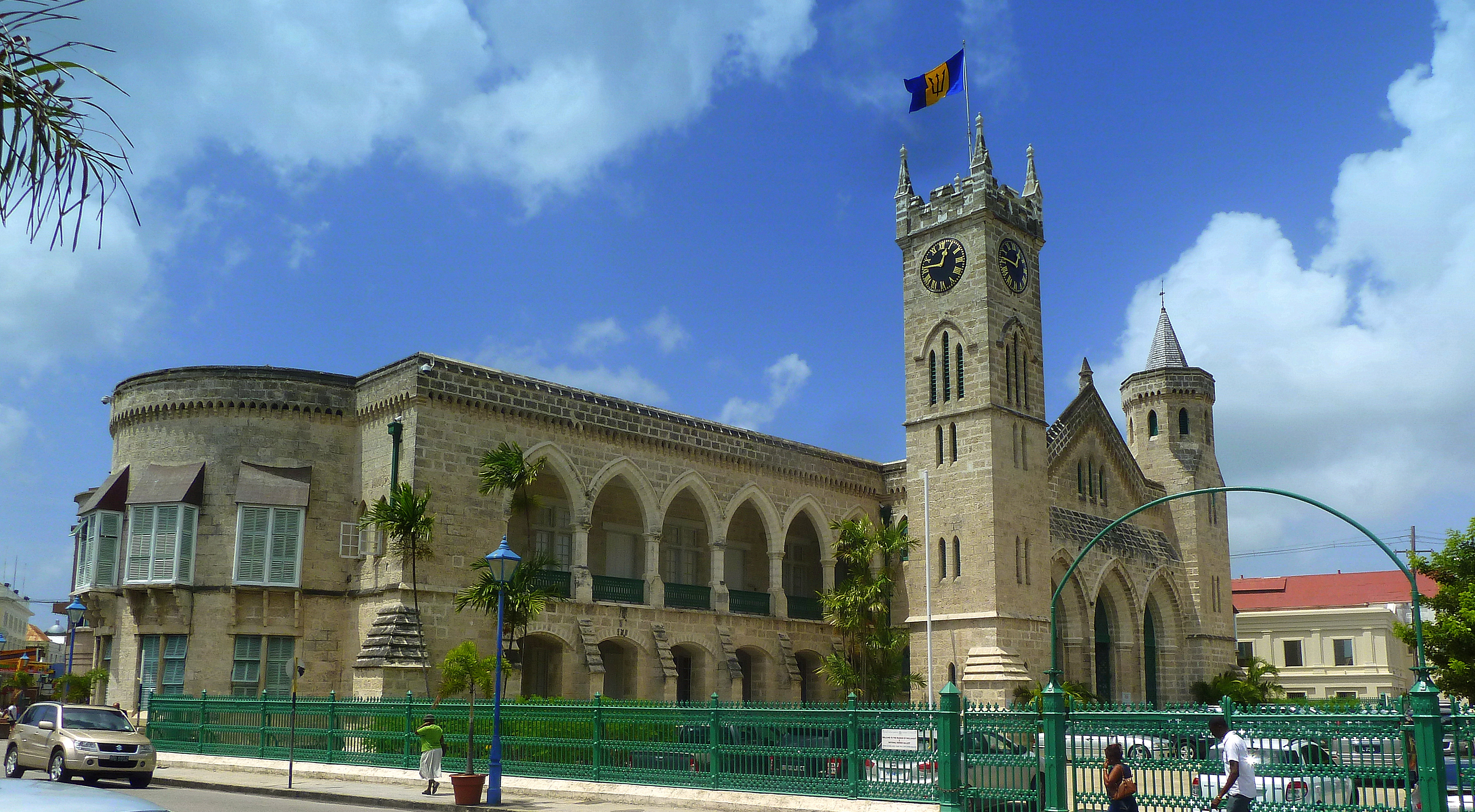

- Location within Barbados
- Former names: The Public Buildings
- Alternative names: Parliament House

General information
- Status: Completed
- Architectural style: Gothic (neo-gothic, with a local or vernacular flavour)
- Location: Bridgetown, Barbados, Parliament Square
- Elevation: 2 m (7 ft)
- Year built: 1870-1874
- Inaugurated: 16 June 1874; 152 years ago
- Cost: £25 000
- Client: Barbadian government

The Parliament Buildings (also known as The Public Buildings, or more rarely Parliament House), is the seat of the Parliament of Barbados. Built between 1870 and 1874, the buildings have served as the meeting place for both chambers of Parliament since 16 June 1874, and were formerly the site of the Colonial administration of Barbados. It consists of two buildings in the neo-Gothic architectural style, and is reminiscent of the Victorian era of Great Britain.

The buildings are situated along the north bank of the Constitution River and are bordered by Upper Broad Street and National Heroes Square to the south; strategically at the heart of the capital city Bridgetown. Before the establishment of the buildings, the legislature met at the Town Hall building (beside the now abandoned National Library Service of Barbados building) on Coleridge Street.

In 1989, the Public Buildings were officially renamed the Parliament Buildings by Act of Parliament. In 2011, both buildings were designated as UNESCO protected properties within the World Heritage Site of Historic Bridgetown and its Garrison area.

== History ==
Although Parliament was established in 1639, these buildings, which house the Parliament, were only constructed in the late 19th century. The reason behind the erection of these buildings was twofold. Firstly, there was a need to find a safe place to store the island's public records, which, before the construction of the Parliament buildings, were stored in various government offices located around Bridgetown. Secondly, the island's legislature needed an appropriate place to convene. From the establishment of the House of Assembly in 1639 to the erection of the Parliament buildings, the legislature shifted from building to building around Bridgetown, and at several instances it actually met at taverns and alehouses. This, of course, was frowned upon by many of the island's previous Governors, several of whom proposed that money be voted for the erection of an appropriate building to house Parliament.

Several plans were made for the erection of a building for Parliament. In 1701, a house was constructed within James Fort, but it was later used as the island's Common Gaol. In 1844, there were plans to erect a Sessions House, but these plans were later abandoned when a great fire in Bridgetown allowed the Government to find a more suitable site.

In 1857, John Glasglow Grant, a member of the House of Assembly, tabled a motion for the erection of the public buildings. A Public Buildings Erection Committee was appointed by the Speaker of the Assembly, whose members included Grant. The committee proposed that not only should the buildings house Parliament but also the Custom House, the Marshal's Office, the Post Office and the Prothonotary's Office.

As of February 2020 the government has been renting various private buildings around Barbados, including the Worthing Corporate Centre and Conference Centre (on 15 Sep 2020 for the State Opening of Parliament) to host Parliament without any firm return date mentioned as too when it might return to using the capital site.

== Construction ==
The construction of the buildings was met with several delays. However, in 1860, there was yet another fire in Bridgetown, and the Government decided to purchase the land, which they believed would be an even better site than the one upon which they had previously agreed. After requesting and unanimously accepting the design of John F. Bourne, the then Superintendent of Public Works, the Committee invited tenders for the construction of the west building. The Assembly decided on the tender of £13,750 submitted by Mr Benjamin L. Harris. Construction of the west building was completed in late 1871 and was presented to the Government at the beginning of 1872. Although Mr Harris had also presented a tender for the East building to the tune of £15,750, the Assembly accepted the tender of Mr Richard F. Roberts for £11,750. The east wing was handed over to the Government two years later.

== East wing ==
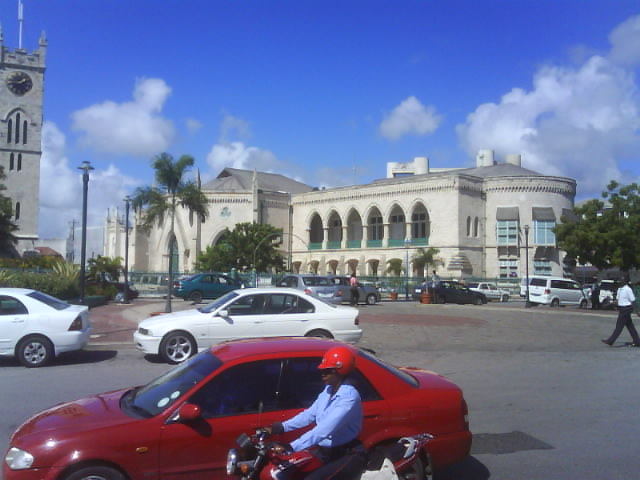
The east-wing of the Parliament of Barbados, completed in 1873.

The East Wing was completed in late 1873. It still houses the Chambers and offices of the once Legislative Council (now the Senate) and the House of Assembly. The Attorney-General, Solicitor-General and the Chief Parliamentary Council also had offices there.

Several offices were located on the ground floor of the East Wing at various periods. These included:

- The Public Library
- The Public Works Department
- The Master-in-Chancery (later known as the Registrar)
- The Legal Draftsman (later known as Chief Parliamentary Counsel)
- The Income Tax Department
- The Post Office
- some offices of the Central Bank

The east wing has undergone several renovations: In 1970, the East Wing was extended to facilitate a separate entrance to a Strangers Gallery of the House of Assembly from the courtyard; in 1977, a mezzanine floor was then constructed in the central area of the East Wing; in 1986, the chamber of the House of Assembly was comprehensively renovated, starting on 7 May. A separate mezzanine floor was established for the Public Gallery. A sound and vision system was also installed. New furniture, made exclusively of Barbadian mahogany wood, was also heralded. The stained glass windows to the chamber were also re-leaded and otherwise restored. The walls (formerly plastered) were stripped and grouted, and otherwise restored to display their natural sawn Barbadian limestone look. New lighting was also upgraded using the purely decorative original gas chandeliers which are still in place; in September 1988 renovations of the Senate Chamber commenced using the same applications as in the work for the House of Assembly, except the ceiling was aesthetically restored to its original finish; also in 1988 the ground floor of the East Wing was fully renovated to allow for the whole east wing to be available for parliamentary purposes.

Notable features: The stained glass windows in the House of Assembly show the British sovereigns spanning from James I to Queen Victoria. The glass windows within the Senate show the armorial bearings not only of past presidents of the council but also of past speakers of the House of Assembly.

== West wing ==
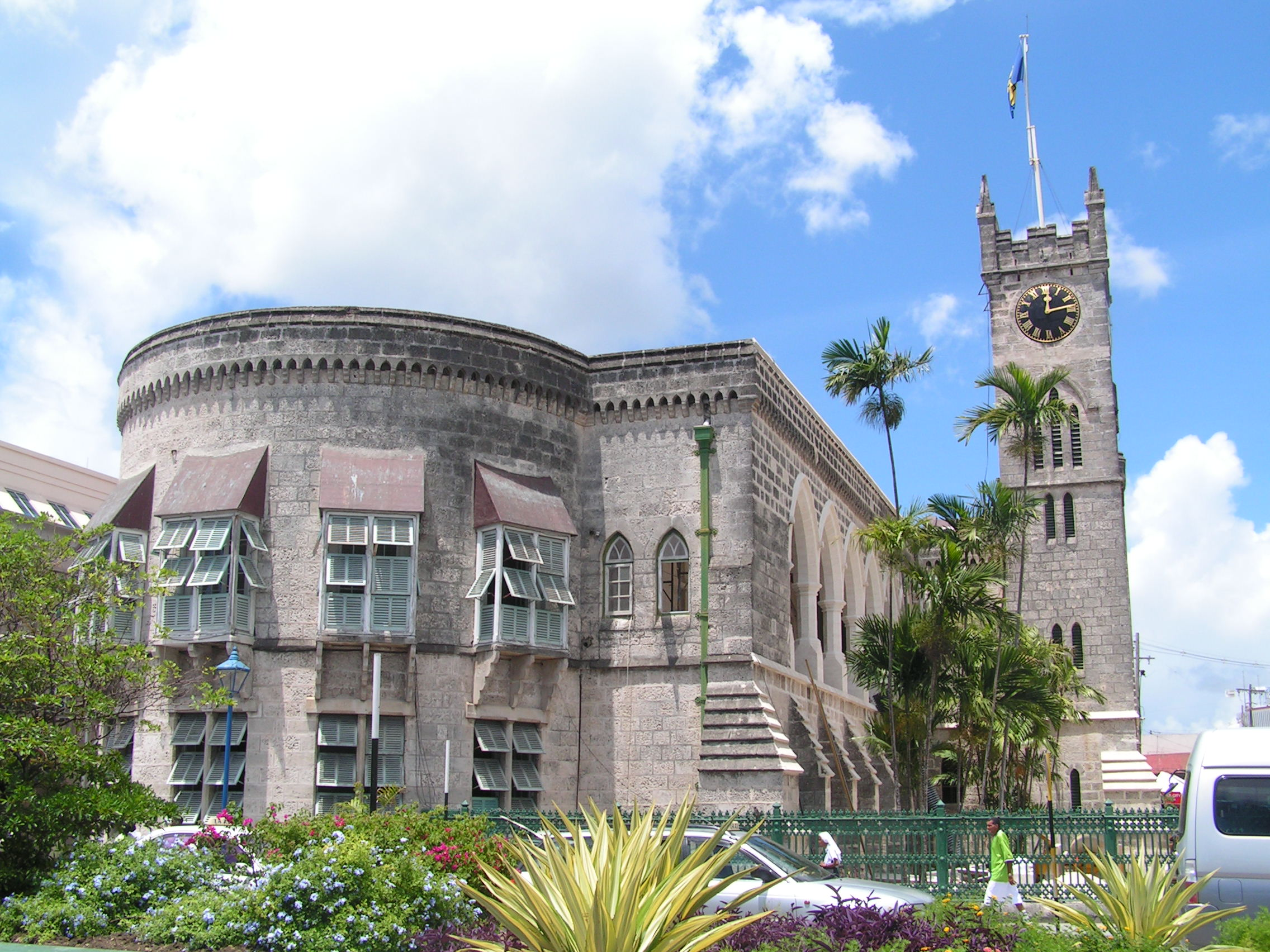
The west-wing of the Parliament of Barbados, completed in 1872.

The West Wing was finished in 1872 and, over the centuries, has accommodated several principal public offices:

- The Colonial Secretary
- The Government Savings Bank
- The Colonial Treasurer
- The Auditor-General
- The Accountant-General
- The Postmaster-General
- The Comptroller of Customs
- The Provost Marshal
- The Director of Education

Also located there were the offices of the first elected Ministers (there were 5 in all) from 1954. During late 1885 to 1886, the clock and bells of the tower once found in the East Wing were relocated to the West Wing. (See more about the clock further down the page.) On the main stairways of this wing, one can also see two stained glass windows which bear the Biblical quote "Render to Caesar the things that are Caesar's...". (Matthew 22:21)

In November 2006, the West Wing of Parliament was refurbished to mark the island's 40th year of Independence. Among other things, the newly refurbished West wing houses a National Heroes Gallery as well as a Museum of Parliament. A ceremony was held to commemorate the reopening of the west wing and was attended by dignitaries as well as the general public.

== Notable features of the Parliament Buildings ==
In addition to its beautiful architecture, the Parliament buildings have several notable architectural features.

The green colour cast iron railing surrounding the courtyard of the Parliament Buildings was made by a British firm called Messrs Andrew Handyside & Co. Ltd. Another notable feature of the building itself is that many of the windows of the building have louvred shutters for blocking out direct sunlight.

During November and December, the city of Bridgetown has an annual national lighting ceremony. During this time, the Parliament Buildings are often elaborately illuminated in the colours of the National Flag (in November) or Green/Red for Christmas (by the middle of December).

=== The Clock tower ===
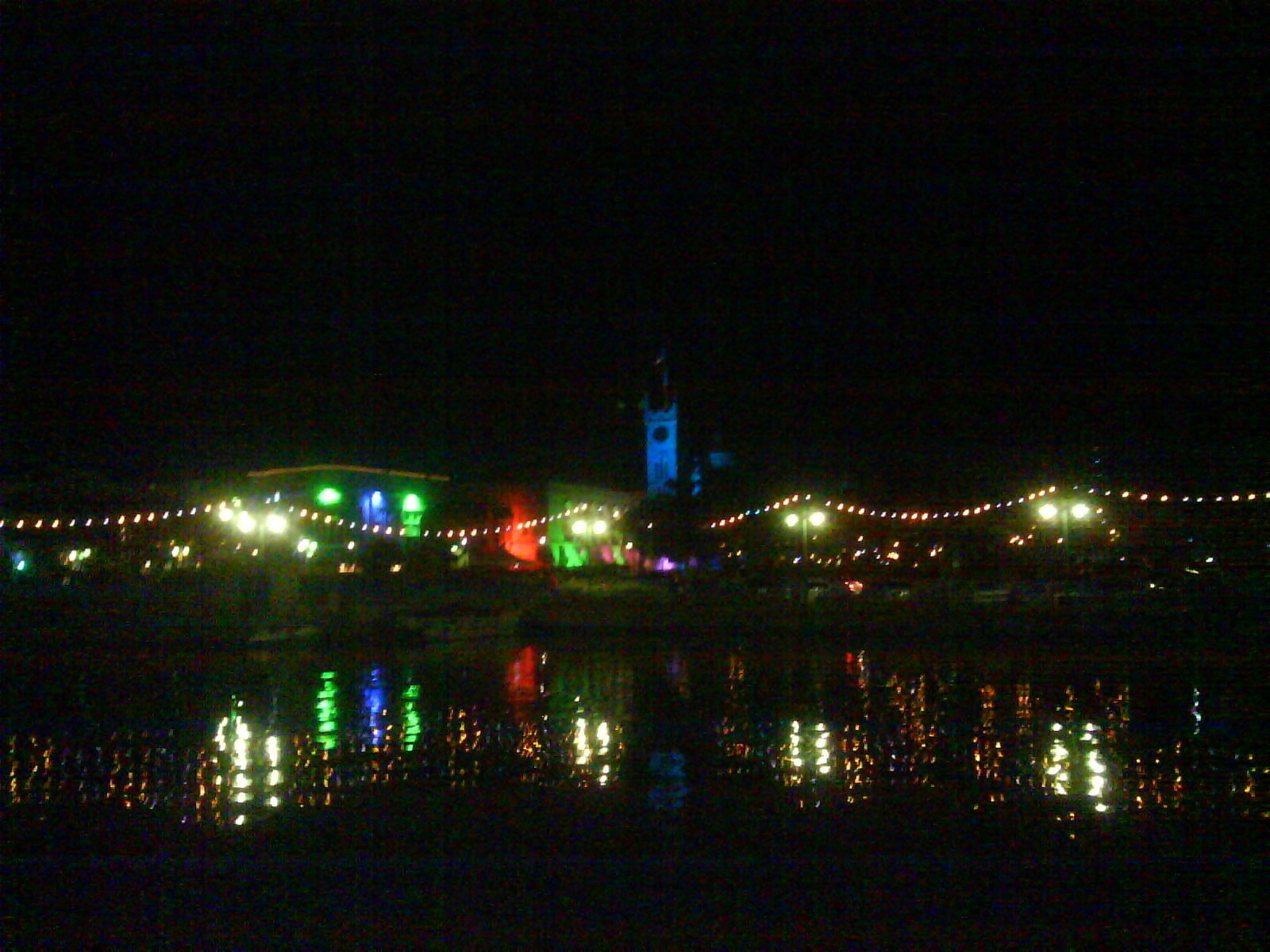
Parliament illuminated at night

A prominent feature of the coral-limestone structures is the clock tower attached to the west wing. The Tower, located in the west wing, can be seen from several vantage points around Bridgetown and is complemented by a four-faced clock on each side. The Barbadian flag is flying triumphantly on top of it. However, the clock tower was not always located in the west wing.

A clock tower with a peal of bells was previously attached to the east wing, where both the Senate and House of Assembly chambers are located, however, poor soil conditions destabilised the clock tower's base, causing it to begin sinking. Within ten years of its construction, the clock tower had sunk by ten feet into the ground. The tower was dismantled in 1884, and a clock tower was later constructed at the west wing, where it stands today. The clock was designed and manufactured by John Moore & Sons of Great Britain (1875). It was designed to run for 8 days and is designed to continue operating even when being wound.

In 2010, the clock was damaged during Tropical Storm Tomas, causing the hands to cease on 2:12. Smith of Derby Group, England was contracted to refurbish the clock.
