= Indian Caribbean Museum of Trinidad and Tobago =

Museum in Trinidad and Tobago

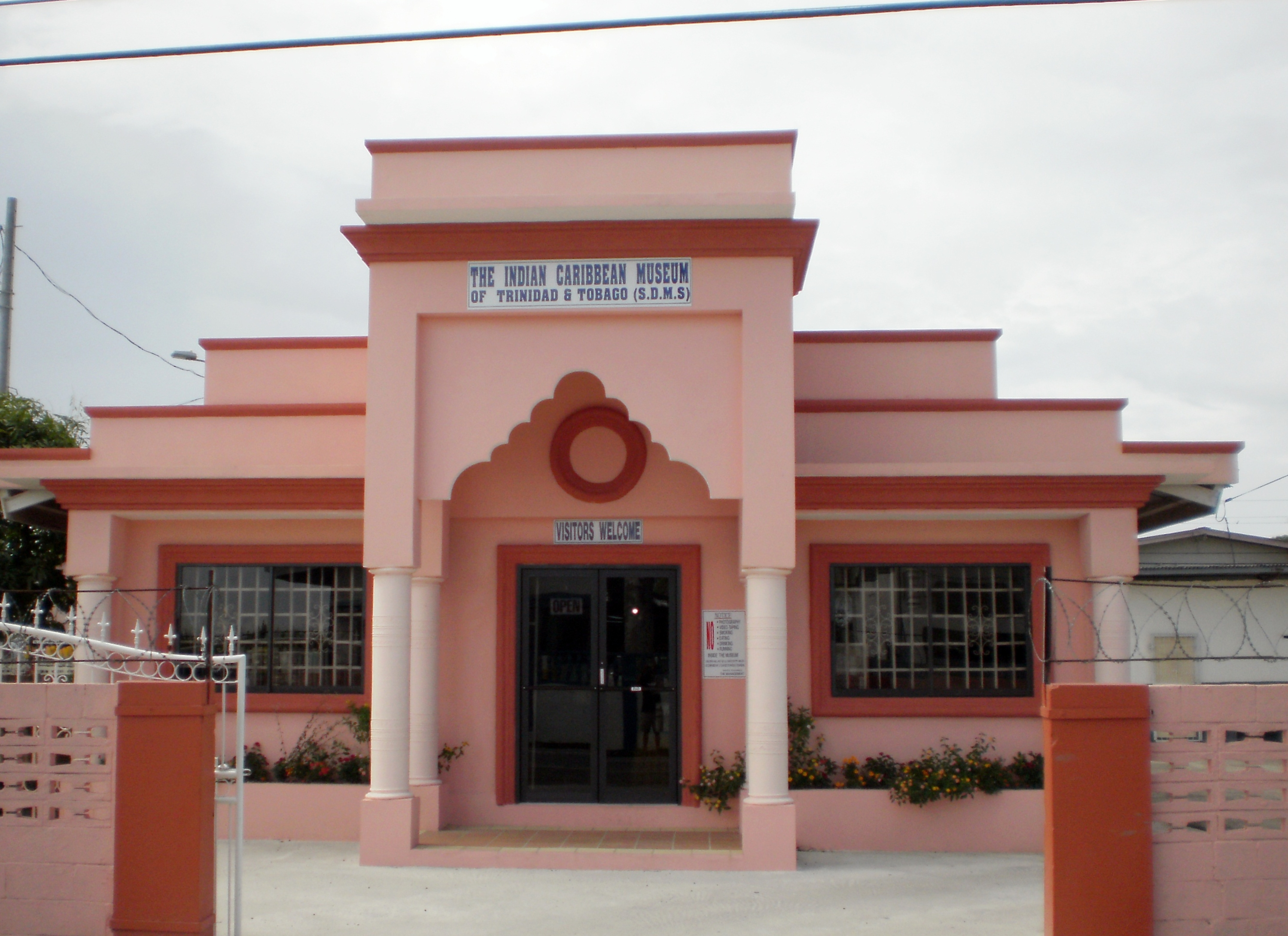
- Indian Caribbean Museum, in the 1919 Waterloo Carnegie Library.

- Location within Trinidad and Tobago
- Established: 2006
- Location: Waterloo, Carapichaima, Trinidad and Tobago
- Coordinates: 10°28′48″N 61°27′31″W
- Owner: Sanatan Dharma Maha Sabha
- Website: icmtt.org

The Indian Caribbean Museum of Trinidad and Tobago is a museum founded by the Sanatan Dharma Maha Sabha in Carapichaima, Trinidad and Tobago. It is dedicated to preserving the history of Indo-Caribbean culture. It is housed in the village of Waterloo, near the Temple in the Sea. In 2006, the Sanatan Dharma Maha Sabha created history by opening the first East Indian Museum in the Caribbean.

== See also ==
- Indo-Trinidadian and Tobagonian
- Indo-Caribbean
- Indian indenture system
- Lalla Rookh Museum
- List of Carnegie libraries in the Caribbean
