= Temple in the Sea =

Temple in the Sea Sewdass Sadhu Shiva Mandir
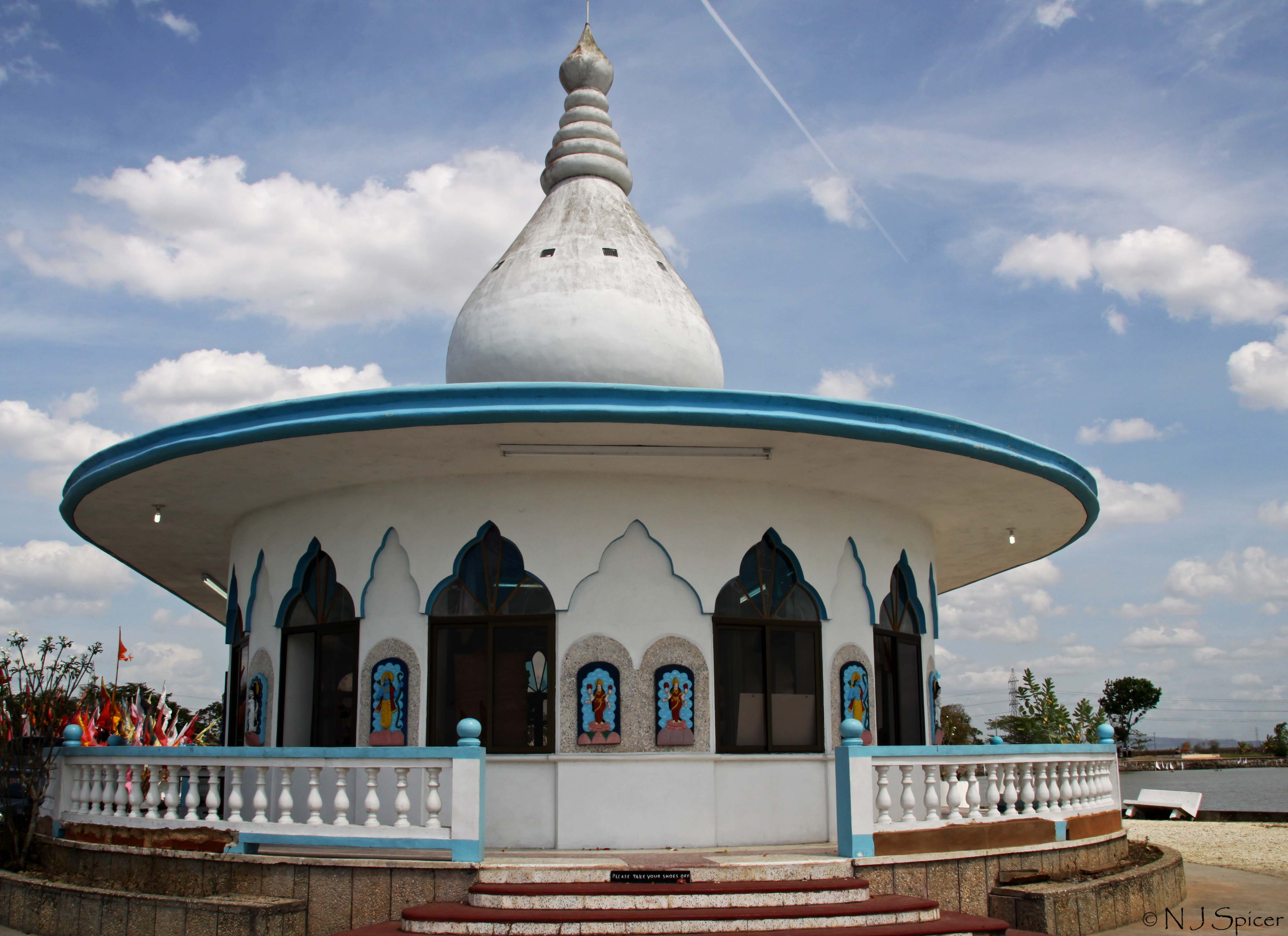

- Location within Trinidad and Tobago

Religion
- Affiliation: Hinduism
- Deity: Shiva, Durga, Ganesha, Hanuman and Krishna
- Festivals: Maha Shivaratri, Kartik Poornima, Ganesh Chaturthi, Diwali
- Governing body: Randolph Rampersad (president)

Location
- Location: Waterloo, Carapichaima
- State: Couva–Tabaquite–Talparo
- Country: Trinidad and Tobago
- Interactive map of Temple in the Sea; Sewdass Sadhu Shiva Mandir
- Coordinates: 10°28′54.1″N 61°28′31.9″W

Architecture
- Type: Hindu architecture and Indian architecture
- Creator: Sewdass Sadhu
- Established: 1947
- Completed: 1952 (original building); 1995 (rebuilding)

The Temple in the Sea, officially known as the Sewdass Sadhu Shiva Mandir, is a Hindu mandir in Waterloo, Carapichaima, Couva–Tabaquite–Talparo, Trinidad and Tobago. Sewdass Sadhu, an indentured laborer from India, constructed the original temple in the Gulf of Paria in 1952. The temple was reconstructed by Randolph Rampersad and reopened in 1995.

== History ==
Between 1845 and 1917, through the establishment of a labour indentured system, many Indians migrated to Trinidad and worked as indentured labourers in plantation sites across the country. In the 1930s, Sewdass Sadhu, an indentured labourer, built a sewalla, a small temple dedicated to Shiva, on an estate owned by The Tate and Lyle Sugar Company by facing the Gulf of Paria. Five years later, the estate management requested Sadhu to remove the temple because it was not his land, but he refused. Sadhu was sent to prison for 14 days and fined 100 pounds for refusing to remove the temple and it was destroyed.

After his release from prison, Sadhu built the temple with the belief that colonial powers had no ownership of the sea. In 1947, Sadhu began riding a bicycle to transport stones, cement, and sand in his bag from the island and unloaded them at the coast of the island to extend the island borders offshore. After the creation of the rocky pathway, Sadhu built another temple in the Gulf of Paria. The rocky pathway into the gulf and the temple were completed in 1952.

== Sewdass Sadhu ==
Sewdass Sadhu was born in 1901 in present-day Uttar Pradesh, India and was the original builder of the temple. He was the son of Boodhram and Bissoondayia, indentured labourers at the Waterloo Sugar Estate in Trinidad. Sadhu traveled to Trinidad on the SS Mutlah when he was 4 years old. He was a devout Hindu who chose to live as a sadhu. He died in 1970.

== Reconstruction ==
After Sadhu's death in 1970, the temple deteriorated in the sea through high tides and a lack of maintenance from people. The Hindu Prachar Kendra started to repair the land connecting the island to the temple. This effort was continued, and the temple was reconstructed and opened in 1995 under the direction of Randolph Rampersad, a third generation Trinidadian of indentured Indian ancestry. The temple was opened in 1995 to commemorate the 150th anniversary of the first arrival of indentured labourers from India. Remnants of the original temple in the sea were used to create the roof of a sewalla that now stands in the same spot as the temple built by Sewdass Sadhu. The reconstructed temple is 100 yards further in the sea than the original temple that Sadhu built. Also in Waterloo is the Indian Caribbean Museum of Trinidad and Tobago. In the nearby community of Orangefield, that is also in Carapichaima, is the Dattatreya Temple and Karyasiddhi Hanuman statue, the tallest Hanuman statue outside of India. Both of these sites are often stops on tours to the Temple in the Sea.

== Deities ==
The Idols of Shiva, Ganesha, Hanuman, Durga, and Krishna are consecrated in the temple.
