= Karya Siddhi Hanuman Temple =

Religion
- Affiliation: Hinduism
- Deity: Hanuman

Location
- Location: 12030 Independence Pkwy, Frisco 75035
- State: Texas
- Country: United States
- Interactive map of Karya Siddhi Hanuman Temple

Architecture
- Creator: Ganapathi Sachchidananda Sthapathi (Temple Architect) Thangam Subramanian Sthapathi
- Completed: July 2009

Website
- www.dallashanuman.org

The Karya Siddhi Hanuman Temple is a Hindu temple in Frisco, Texas. The newly renovated temple was inaugurated in 2015 by its founder, Ganapathi Sachchidananda. The temple's tower, or Raja Gopuram, was constructed in 2019. The central deity of the temple is Hanuman.

== History ==
The Karya Siddhi Temple was established by Ganapathi Sachchidananda Swamiji, a spiritual leader known for his teachings and charitable works. The temple is 34,000 square feet and began its construction in 2007 and was renovated in 2015. The main deity of the Hindu temple is Hanuman. The temple is known for its spiritual atmosphere and is a place where devotees come to seek the blessings of Lord Hanuman for success and fulfillment of their wishes ("karya siddhi" translates to "fulfillment of desires"). The temple's tower, also known as a Raja Gopuram, was developed by Epsilon Architecture in 2019, and was constructed according to the Agama Shastras, which provide guidelines for Hindu temple construction. The tower is 72 feet tall and 900 square feet.

The newly, renovated temple opened on July 23, 2015, and a week later, on August 1, the temple was the venue for a Guinness World Record for the longest continuous chanting with over 24 hours of recitation of Hanuman Chalisa.

In late 2025 and early 2026, amid wider controversy in Frisco over the city's growing Indian American population, the temple was the site of several protests. A Turning Point USA reporter made a video at the temple that generated hate comments directed at the temple and Indian Americans.
