= Ganapathi Sachchidananda =

Indian Hindu avadhuta

His Holiness Sri Sri Datta Naada Swamiji (Ganapathi Sachchidananda) Swamiji
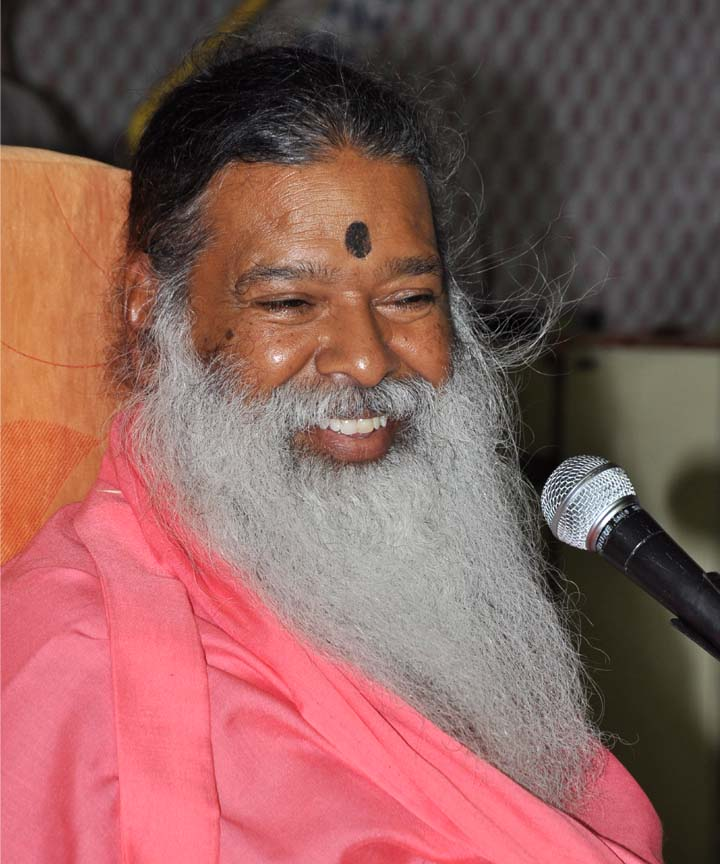
- Sri Datta Naada Swamiji (Sri Ganapathi Sachchidananda Swamiji.jpg)

Personal life
- Born: 26 May 1942 (age 84) Mekedatu, Madras Presidency, British India (present-day Karnataka, India)

Religious life
- Religion: Hinduism

Sri Datta Naada Swamiji (Sri Ganapathi Sachchidananda Swamiji) is a Hindu avadhuta and an extremely mystical Indian guru. He is primarily active in the Indian states of Andhra Pradesh, Karnataka and Tamil Nadu, and has a huge following in the United States, the United Kingdom, Ireland and Trinidad and Tobago.

== Shuka Vana Aviary ==
Sri Ganapathi Sachchidananda Swamiji founded Shuka Vana, a rehabilitation center for birds located at the Avadhoota Datta Peetham ashram in Mysore. The aviary has over 2,100 rare birds of more than 470 endangered and critically endangered exotic species which is a Guinness World Record.

A well-equipped hospital is attached to the Shuka Vana and the hospital helps injured and ill birds and helps with their rehabilitation.

== Associated organizations ==
Ganapathi Sachchidananda founded several organizations, including :

=== Avadhoota Datta Peetham ===
Avadhoota Datta Peetham is an umbrella organisarion supporting Sri Swamiji's vision and mission by providing the necessary guidance to all devotees

The Datta Peetham is a prominent spiritual, cultural, and humanitarian institution headquartered at the Sri Ganapathy Sachchidananda Ashrama in Mysuru, Karnataka, India.

Founded by Sri Ganapathy Sachchidananda Swamiji, the Peetham is dedicated to the preservation and propagation of ancient Vedic traditions, the promotion of music therapy, and the advancement of universal social welfare.

The Peetham serves as the central administrative hub for a vast network of over 100 ashram branches throughout India and across the globe, including centres in the United States, the United Kingdom, Trinidad and Tobago, Canada, Ireland and Germany. Sri Datta Vijayananda Teertha Swamiji (known as Sri Bala Swamiji) serves as the junior pontiff and designated spiritual successor of the Ashram.

The Mysuru headquarters features several architecturally and culturally significant facilities:

Nada Mantapa: A massive, technically advanced auditorium explicitly dedicated to Nada (sound and music). It hosts international music, dance, and cultural programs throughout the year.

Shuka Vana: A world-record-holding bird rehabilitation center and aviary located within the ashram premises. It houses over 2,100 rare, exotic, and endangered birds and an avian

Renowned as one of the largest bonsai collections in India, the Kishkinda Moolika Bonsai Garden showcases a diverse variety of miniature trees nurtured under organic conditions.

Dharma Dhwajam : A 45-foot monolithic octagonal stone pillar carved with universal symbols representing world religions, yoga, philosophy, and music.

The complex also houses several holy shrines, including the universal prayer hall dedicated to Kaalaagni Samana Dattatreya, the Sri Datta Venkateswara Kshetram, and the Karya Siddhi Hanuman Temple.

The Peetham structures its ongoing operations into three distinct pillars:

Education and Culture :

The institution runs a Veda Pathashala, where young scholars are trained in traditional Vedic literature, Shastras, Aagamas, and Sanskrit linguistics. Certificates and Medals are awarded to those who have mastered the Bhagavad Gita.

Humanitarian and Healthcare Services : The SGS Charitable Hospital provides both Ayurvedic and Allopathic medical care to local populations. The Peetham also operates multiple philanthropic programs.

Music Therapy Research :

Under Swamiji's guidance, the Peetham acts as a foundational research center exploring the spiritual and physiological impacts of meditation music and ragas on human health.

=== Amma Vodi ===
Amma Vodi, meaning Mother's Lap is a 200 bed rehabilitation center and hospital for destitute women in Dundigal, near Hyderabad, India.

== Recognitions ==
=== Guinness World Records ===
Guinness World Records set by Sri Swamiji.

- Most people chanting: a world record of 128,918 people in Tenali, India on 31 January 2015
- Largest Hindu smriti: (body of Hindu texts) 2.24 metres (7 ft 4 in) x 1.56 metres (5 ft 1 in) on 26 May 2017
- Largest music therapy lesson: a world record of 1,841 people at the Sydney Opera House conducted by Sri Swamiji on 6 April 2015
- Longest chanting marathon (team): 24 hours, 10 minutes, 8 seconds on 31 July 2015, at Karya Siddhi Hanuman Temple in Frisco, Texas.
- Largest breathing lesson: July 2016, at India Community Center, Milpitas, California, USA
- Largest online video album of people chanting: 40,976 videos announced at Carapichaima, Trinidad and Tobago 31 July 2016
- Largest display of bonsai trees: over 2,600 at the World Bonsai Convention in Mysore Ashrama December 2016
- Most bird species in an aviary: 486 species, 6 May 2017
- World's largest special stamp: measures 2.87 m^{2} (30.9 sq ft), on 26 May 2018 at Avadhoota Datta Peetham, Mysuru, India. The stamp was issued by the Indian Postal Department commemorating the Vishwam Museum.

== In popular culture ==
- Swamiji appeared in the movie Swathi Kiranam (1992), in the song "Shivani Bhavani" shot in his ashram.
