= List of historic buildings in Bridgetown and Saint Ann's Garrison =

This is a list of buildings which have been listed as protected properties of UNESCO's World Heritage site within Historic Bridgetown, Barbados and its Garrison.

== List of buildings ==
Historic buildings in the City of Bridgetown and St. Ann's Garrison
NAME OF PROPERTY (former)	Current occupant	Address (Alley, Gap, Row, St., Rd., Ln.)	Status	Usage	Photo	Architectural style	Built	Notes
Paul's Boutique	Snaps	McGregor St.	In-use	Commercial (A)				
ManShop		McGregor St.	vacant					
Mustor's Restaurant	Mustor's Restaurant	McGregor St.	In-use	Restaurant				
Lynch Insurance Building	N/A	McGregor St.	In-use	Commercial (A)				
Le Bistro & Timex Centre	N/A	Prince William & Henry St.	In-use	Commercial (A)				
The Spirit Bond	N/A	The Wharf Rd.	In-use	Mixed-use				
Dacosta Mall	Dacosta Mall	Broad St.	In-use	Commercial (A)				
Barbados Mutual Life	Butterfield Bank/ Goddards Enterprises	Lower Broad St.	In-use	Commercial (B)				
Town Hall Building	Barbados Tourism Investment Inc.	Cheapside Main Rd.	In-use	Commercial (B)				
Saint Mary's (Anglican) Church	Saint Mary's (Anglican) Church	Cheapside Main Rd.	In-use	Church				
Carlisle Bond	Carlisle Bond	Hincks St.	In-use	Commercial (A)				
Gretna Green	Gretna Green	Mason Hall St.	In-use	Residential				
Viola Cot	N/A	Mason Hall St.	Residential	Residential				
Mrs. Drakes House	Mrs. Drakes House	Mason Hall St.	Unk.	Dilapidated				
Saint Mary's Junior School	Saint Mary's Junior School	Mason Hall St.	In-use	School				
Scotty's	Scotty's	Cheapside Main Rd.	In-use	Commercial (A)				
Travel House	Travel House	Cheapside Main Rd.	vacant					
Queensbury	Queensbury	Reed St.	In-use	Mixed-Use				
Thinking Computers	Thinking Computers	Reed St.	In-use	Commercial (A)				
C. M. Greenidge & Sons	N/A	Tudor St.	Unk.	Dilapidated				
Maxwell Shop	Flame Shop	Tudor St.	In-use	Commercial (A)				
Liberty Store	Liberty Store	Swan St.	In-use	Commercial (A)				
Kirpalani Ltd.	Stepper's Boutique	Swan St.	In-use	Commercial (A)				
Kiddies Korner	Tim's Restaurant	Swan St.	In-use	Mixed-Use				
Foam House	Foam House	Lucas St.	In-use	Commercial (A)				
Mr. Waithe's House	Mottley House	Coleridge St.	In-use	Commercial (B)				
Central Police Station	Central Police Station	Coleridge St.	In-use	Governmental				
Supreme Court	Supreme Court	Coleridge St.	vacant	Governmental				
Carnegie Public Library building	Public Library	Coleridge St.	vacant	Governmental				
Parliament	Parliament & Museum	Trafalgar St.	In-use	Governmental				
Jewish Synagogue	Nidhe Israel Jewish Synagogue	Magazine Ln.	In-use	Synagogue				
Nidhe Israel Jewish Museum	Jewish Synagogue	Synagogue Ln.	In-use	Jewish Museum				
The Torch Printery	N/A	Marhill St.	In-use	Commercial (A)				
Building No. 1	Shalom Hair & Nails Salon	Dottin's Alley	In-use	Mixed-Use				
Building No. 3	Island Treasure / Tasty Treats	Dottin's Alley	In-use	Mixed-Use				
Olympic Cinema	Bell's Leather Establishment & Accessories	Palmetto St.	In-use	Commercial (A)				
Pal-Mal	Pal-Mal	Palmetto St.	In-use	Commercial (A)				
Sahely's	Sahely's	Palmetto St.	In-use	Commercial (A)				
Realty Investments	Realty Investments	Palmetto St.	In-use	Commercial (A)				
Masonic Lodge	Masonic Lodge	Spry St.	In-use	Lodge				
Saint Michael's (Anglican) Cathedral	Saint Michael's (Anglican) Cathedral	Saint Michael's Row	In-use	Church				
Stratton House	Stratton House	Saint Michael's Row	vacant					
Gitten's Cozy Nook	N/A	Roebuck St.	vacant					
Hilton Bar and Restaurant	N/A	Roebuck St.	In-use	Mixed-Use				
Grasmere	Grasmere	Roebuck St.	Unk.	Residential				
Alders Furniture Depot	N/A	Roebuck St.	In-use	Commercial (A)				
V Bourne Bar	Andy's Bakery & Vegetarian Deli	Roebuck St.	In-use	Restaurant				
De Freitas and Company	De Freitas and Company	Roebuck St.	In-use	Mixed-Use				
Straughns Garage	N/A	Roebuck St.	In-use	Mixed-Use				
Lenville	Lenville	Crumpton St.	Unk.	Dilapidated				
The Retreat	Harrison's College	Crumpton St.	In-use	Secondary School				
Villa Angela	Villa Angela	Crumpton St.	vacant					
Rus In Urbe	Rus In Urbe	Crumpton St.	In-use	Commercial (C)				
Ministry of Agriculture	Harrison's College (Laboratories)	Crumpton St.	In-use	Secondary School				
Queen's Park House	Queen's Park House	Constitution Rd.	In-use	Mixed-Use				
The Engine Room / the Pumping House	The Clock House	Constitution Rd.	In-use	Storage				
College Gate	College Gate	Constitution Rd.	In-use	Access point				
Governor-General's Gate	Governor-General's Gate	Constitution Rd.	In-use	Access point				
Bandstand	Bandstand	Constitution Rd.	In-use	Gazebo				
Old Headmistress Office: Queen's College	Ministry Of Education	Constitution Rd.	Unk.	Governmental				
Old Combermere	Ministry Of Education	Constitution Rd.	Unk.	Governmental				
Old Queen's College	Ministry Of Education; Elsie Payne Complex	Constitution Rd.	Unk.	Governmental				
The Grotto	The Grotto	River Rd.	Demolished	null				
Norma Villa	Norma Villa	River Rd.	vacant					
H Lynch Liquor store	N/A	Beckwith St.	Unk.	Dilapidated				

== Note ==
- UP IN ARMS
