= National Heroes Square =

Location in Bridgetown, Barbados

Coordinates: 13°05′46″N 59°36′51″W

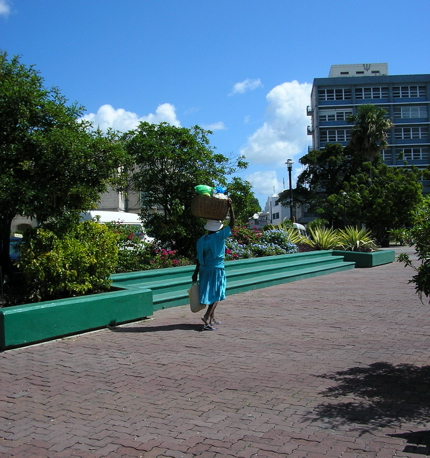
View of National Heroes Square, Bridgetown, Barbados, February 2007

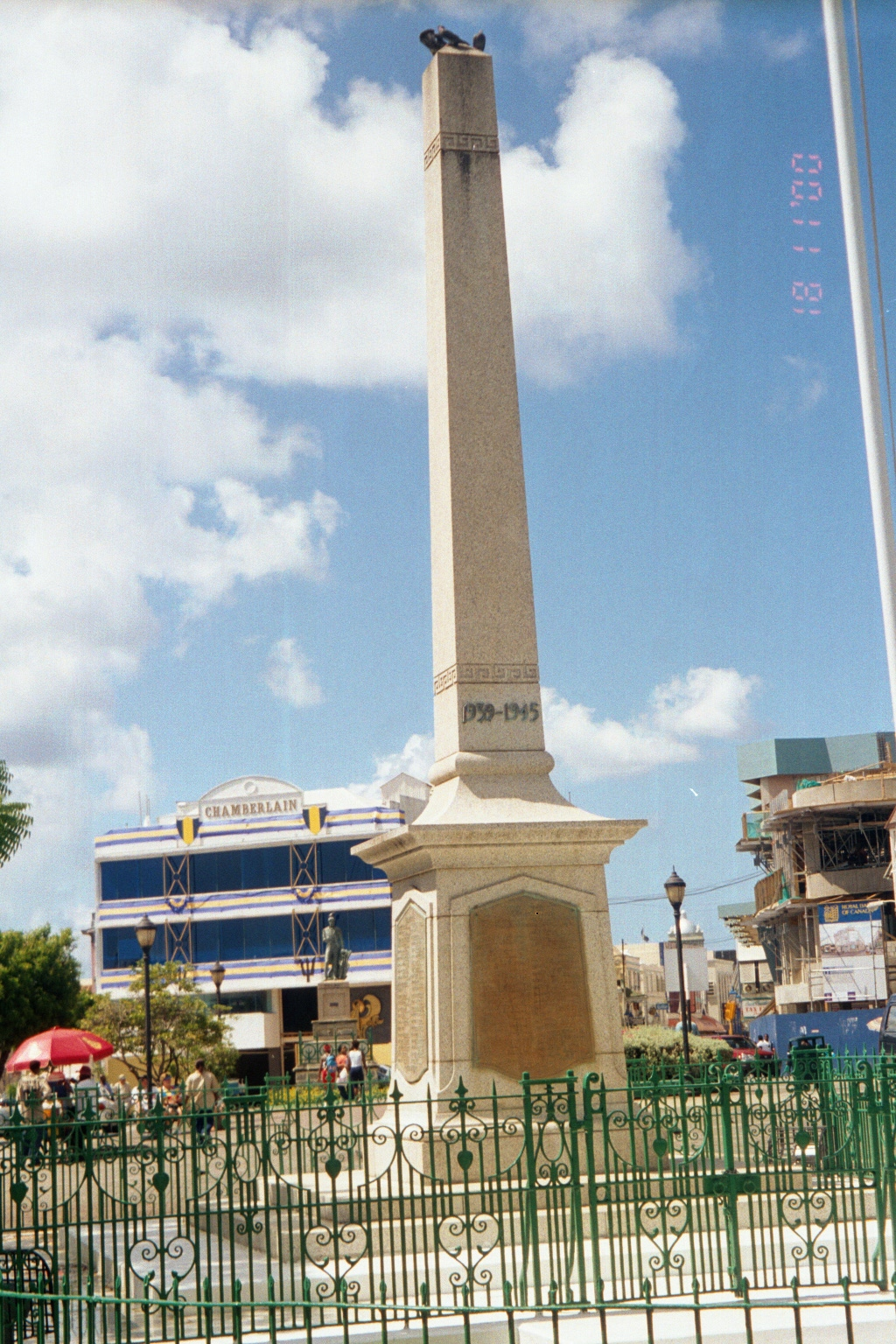
The Cenotaph War Memorial and Lord Nelson's statue, November 2000

National Heroes Square, formerly Trafalgar Square, is located in Bridgetown, the capital and principal commercial centre of the island-nation of Barbados. The square lies along Upper Broad Street and is on the northern shore of the Careenage ("Constitution River"), found directly in the centre of Bridgetown.

== Name ==
The current name of National Heroes Square was adopted on 22 April 1999 and officially took effect on 28 April 1999. The name refers to the Barbadian National Heroes.

In 2009, the government of David Thompson opened up a proposal to rename the square as Parliament Square, and to completely redevelop and reconfigure the Square's layout.

== Statue of Lord Nelson ==
Until 2020, a bronze statue of British naval hero Vice Admiral Horatio, Lord Nelson was a fixture of the Square on the west end. The statue in Bridgetown had been unveiled on 22 March 1813 to commemorate the anniversary of the British Royal Navy's victory in the Battle of Trafalgar in 1805, and was erected approximately 27 years before the more famous Nelson's Column in London, which serves as the centrepiece of Trafalgar Square.

As a point of reference, the statue of Nelson served as the geographic centre of Bridgetown. Since the colonial period many distances on the island from Bridgetown have historically been measured from the base of Nelson's statue, so that the statue functioned as Barbados' mile zero. The use of the Bajan Nelson statue as a centring point is similar to the London statue in the British capital; however, Trafalgar Square is adjacent to the actual historic and geographic centre of London, which is actually located, immediately to the east, in Charing Cross. The monument which serves as London's exact centre is therefore not of Nelson, but the equestrian statue of Charles I, at Charing Cross, facing down Whitehall, standing where the Queen Eleanor Memorial Cross had previously stood before being moved to the Charing Cross railway station forecourt.

Since 2020, the statue has been relocated to the Barbados Museum.

== Gallery ==
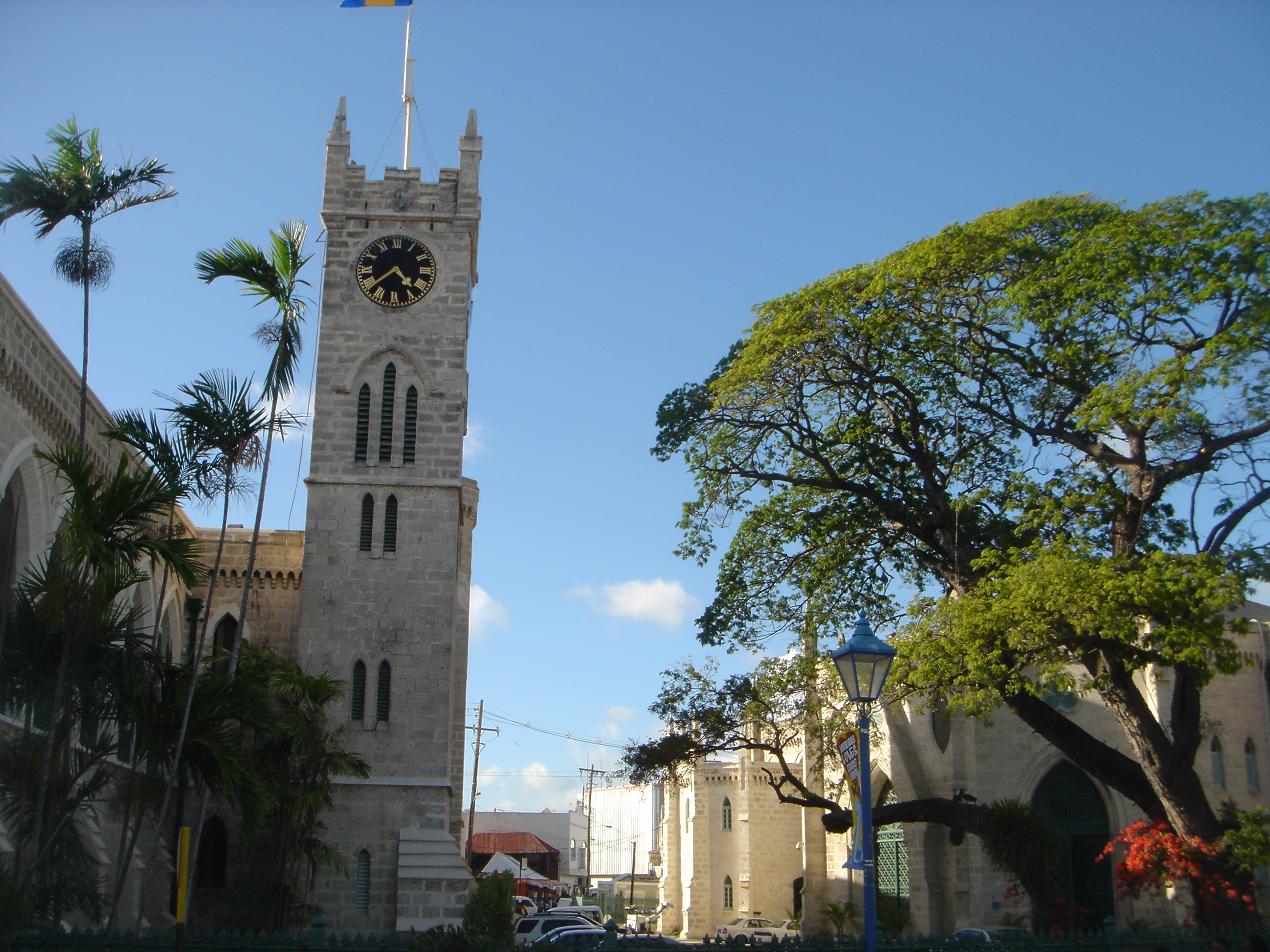
View of the west wing of the Barbados Parliament Building from National Heroes Square.

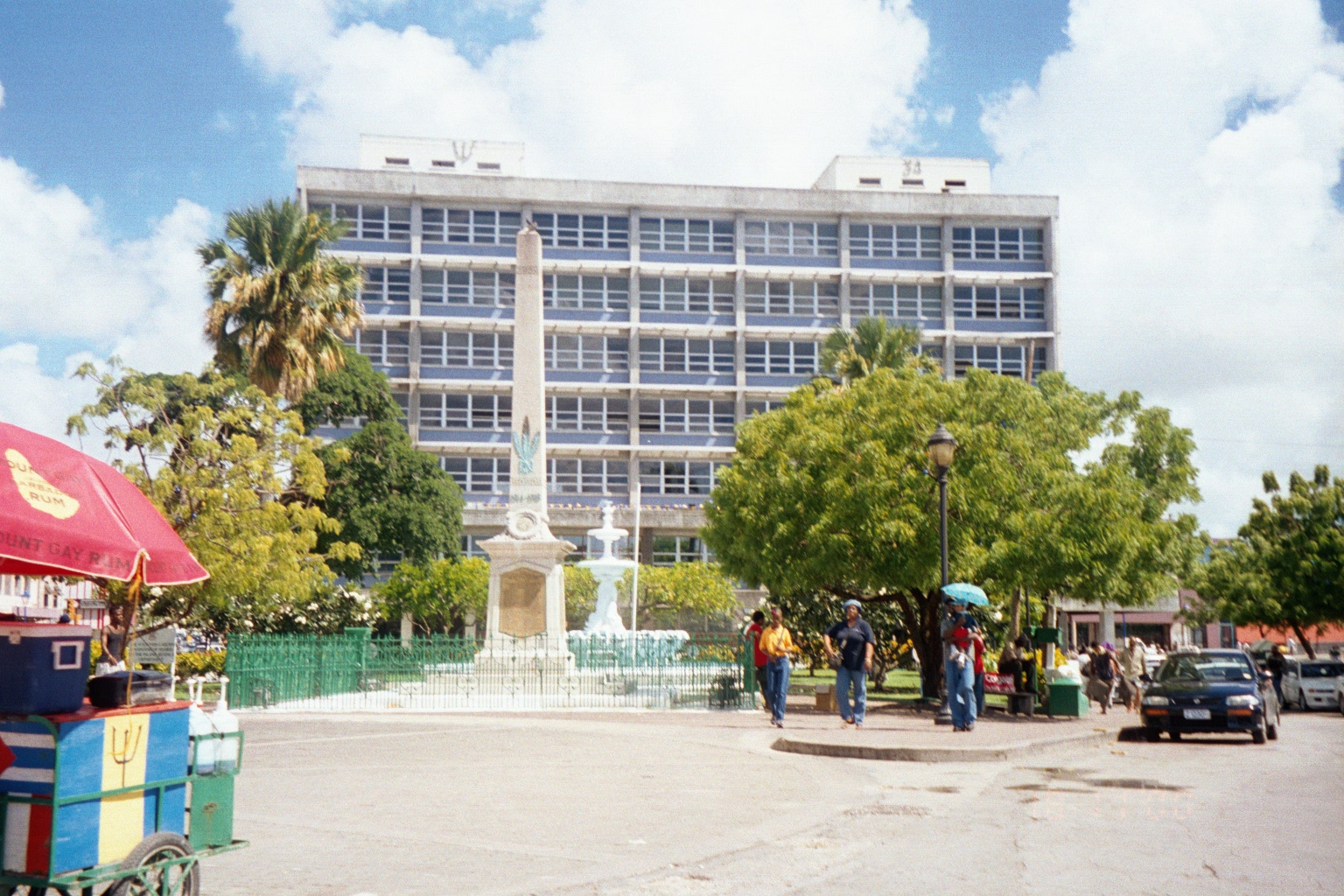
The Cenotaph War Memorial, the Fountain Gardens, and Department of Inland Revenue in the background, November 2000.

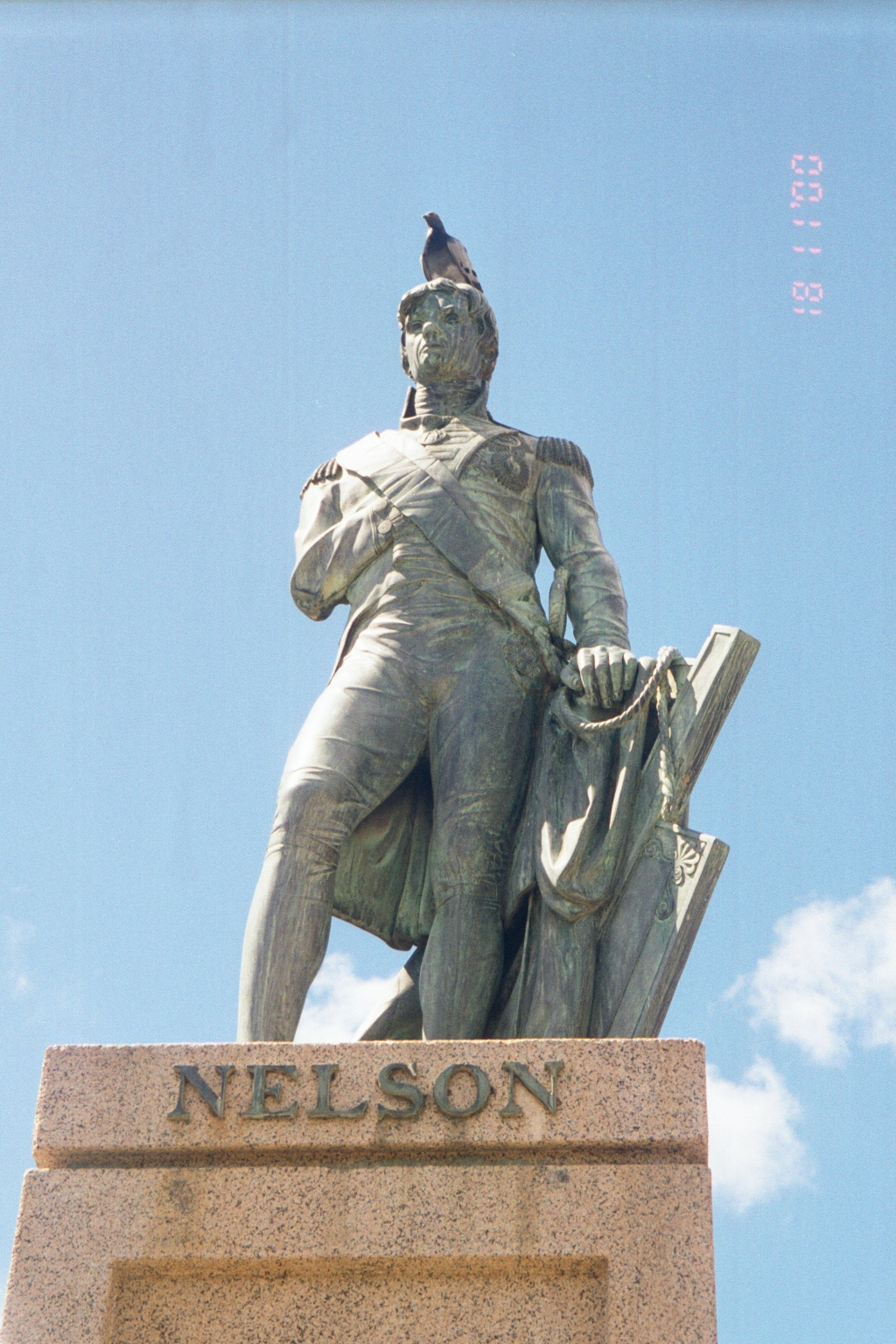
Lord Nelson's statue in Barbados, West Indies, November 2000 (close-up).

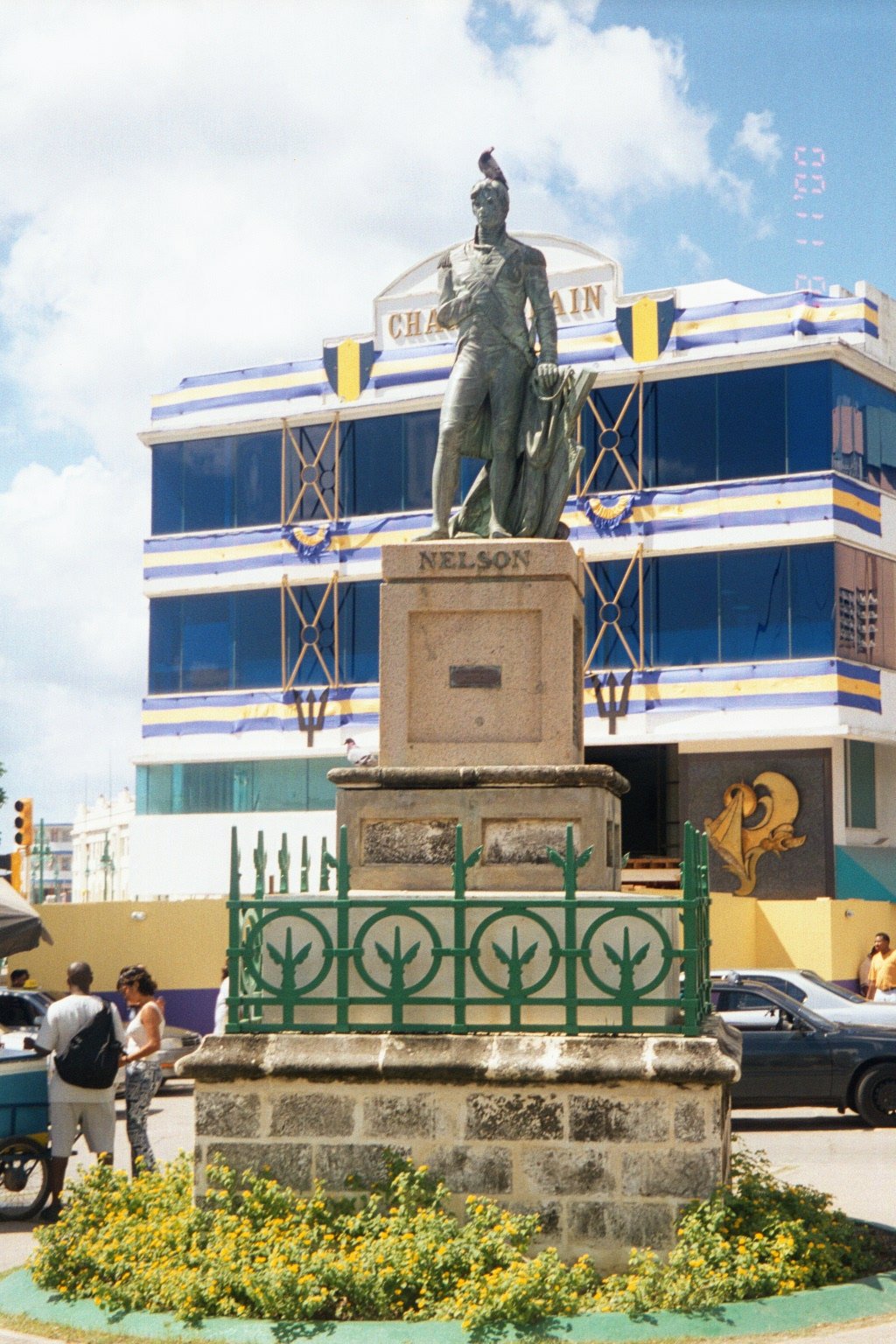
Lord Nelson's statue in Barbados, West Indies, November 2000.

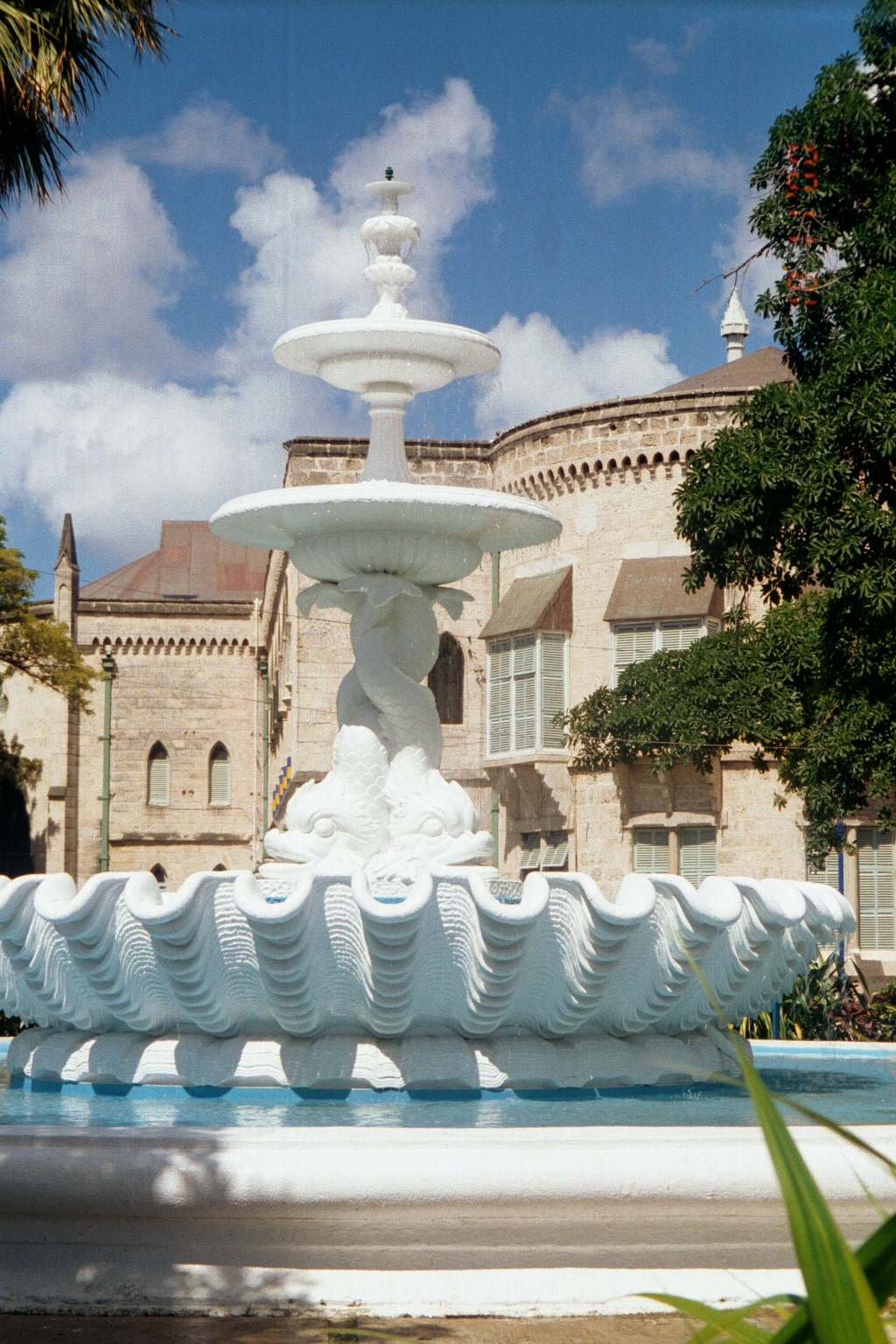
This fountain commemorates the introduction of piped water in Bridgetown. It was built in 1865.
