= Filardi House =

Historic house in Yauco, Puerto Rico

- U.S. National Register of Historic Places
- Puerto Rico Historic Sites and Zones
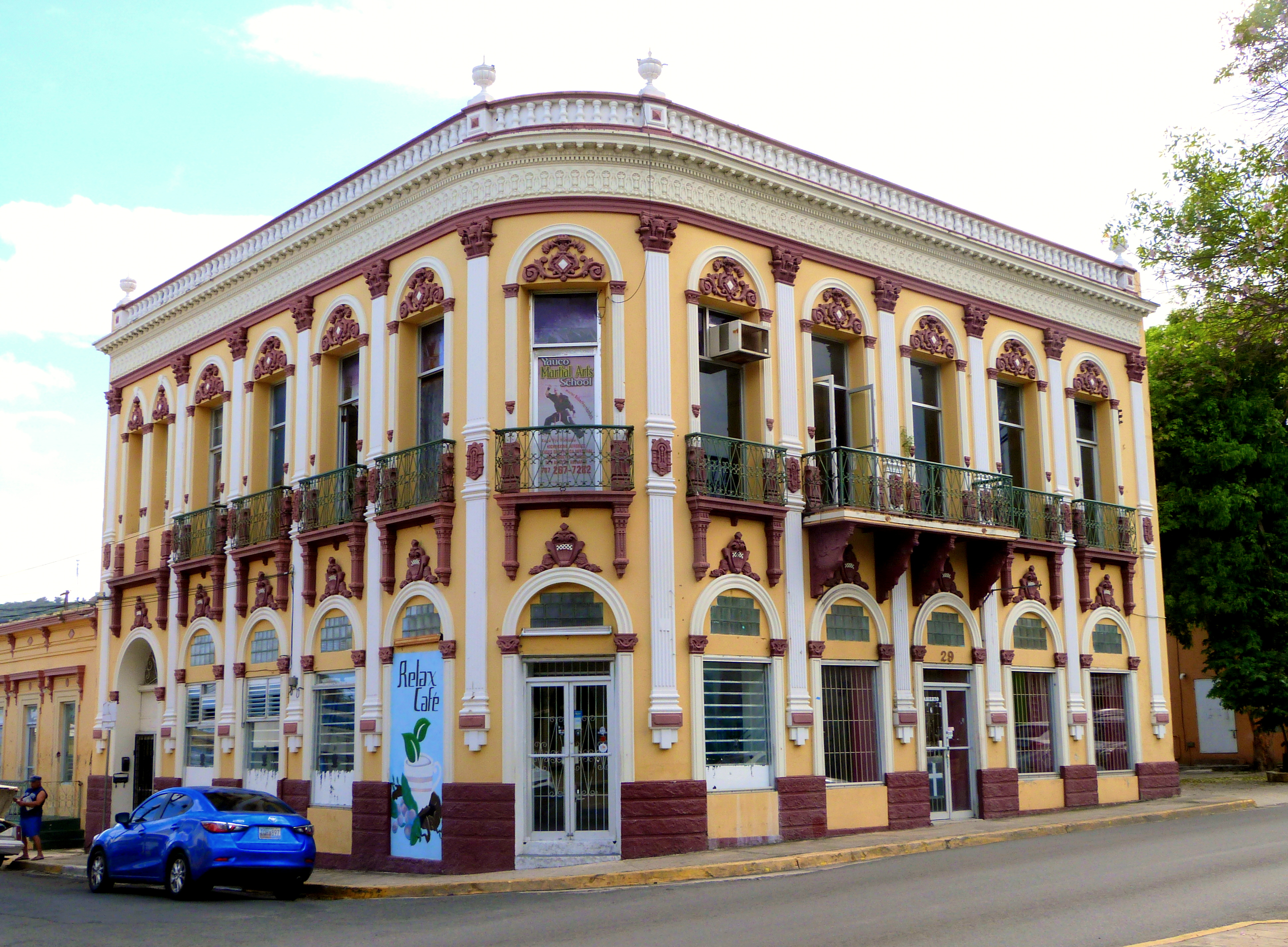
- The Filardi House in 2017

- Location within Puerto Rico
- Location: Junction of Calle 25 de Julio and Calle Baldorioty; Yauco, Puerto Rico
- Coordinates: 18°02′00″N 66°51′00″W
- Area: 225 m^{2} (2,420 sq ft)
- Built: 1916
- Architect: Vicente Filardi Ponzi, Juan Bautista Filardi Cantizani, Domingo Filardi Cantizani
- Architectural style: Beaux-Arts
- NRHP reference No.: 85000116
- RNSZH No.: 2001-(RS)-23-JP-SH

Significant dates
- Added to NRHP: January 16, 1985
- Designated RNSZH: May 16, 2001

The Filardi House (Spanish: Casa Filardi), also known as Casa Muñoz (English: Muñoz House), is a historic house with ground-level commercial space in Yauco, Puerto Rico. It is notable for the extensive use of concrete sculptural ornamentation on its facade. Italian immigrant Vicente Filardi, a contractor with business in Ponce and Yauco, designed and built the house in 1916 with his sons Juan Bautista and Domingo. The younger Filardis were responsible for the integration of the elaborate decorative features with the overall Beaux-Arts plan, and later came to be recognized as experts in production of ornamental elements of cast concrete.

The house was added to the U.S. National Register of Historic Places in 1985, and on the Puerto Rico Register of Historic Sites and Zones in 2001.

== See also ==
- National Register of Historic Places listings in Yauco, Puerto Rico
- Alex Llombart Filardi
- Carmelo Filardi
