= Carmelo Filardi =

Puerto Rican artist (1900–1989)

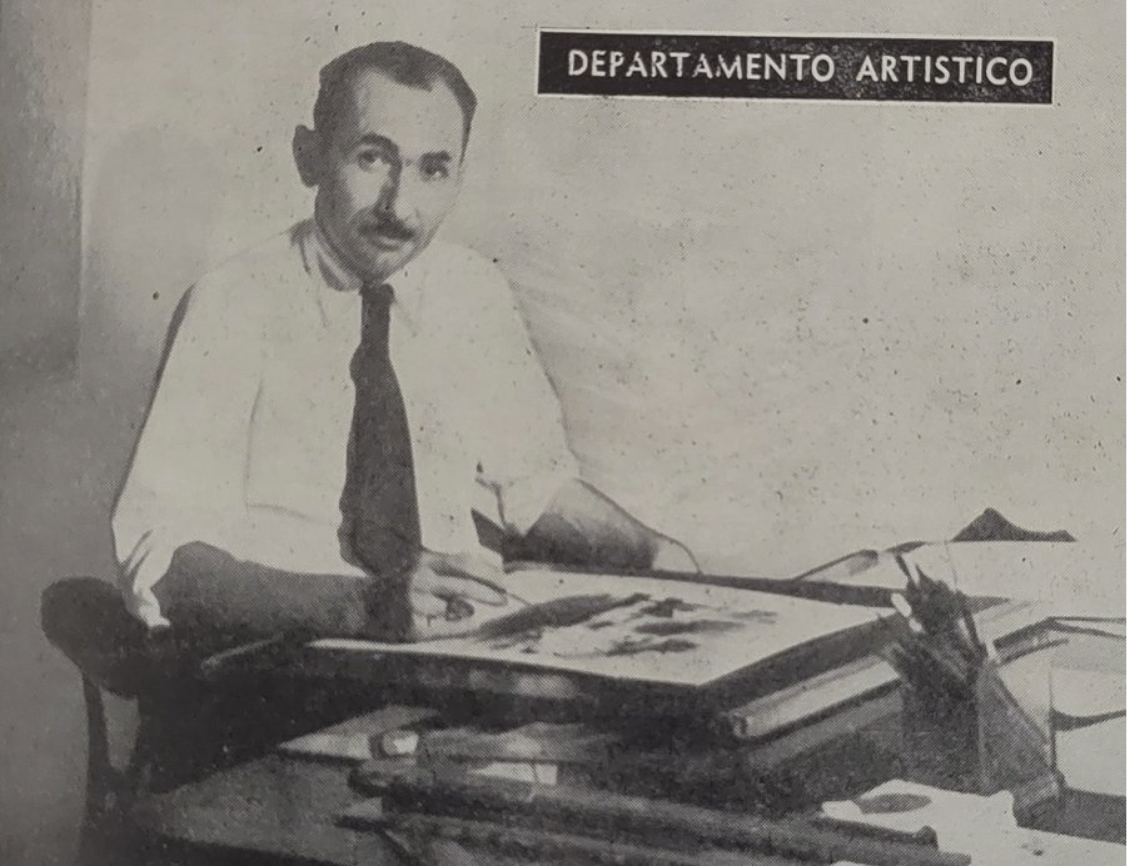
- Carmelo Filardi de Cantisani in his office
- Born: Carmelo Filardi Cantisani; November 25, 1900; Yauco, Puerto Rico
- Died: December 7, 1989 (aged 89); Rio Piedras, Puerto Rico
- Occupation: Cartoonist
- Known for: cartoons published in El Mundo newspaper
- Children: Carlos Filardi Antonmattei
- Parent(s): Vicente Filardi, Maria Cantisani
- Relatives: Domingo Filardi, Juan Bautista Filardi

Carmelo Filardi (1900–1989) was a Puerto Rican artist of Italian ancestry. He was a cartoonist who had his work published in Puerto Rico's El Mundo newspaper starting in 1927. He was from Yauco, Puerto Rico and his parents were born in Italy. Filardi specialized in satire and journalistic criticism. To do this, he used depictions of average daily life in Puerto Rico to illustrate his thoughts. He was a caricaturist and his work is included in University of Puerto Rico collections.

His first published cartoon in El Mundo was in 1927. In 1947, he published a book called Un año de historia en caricaturas, which contained a selection of his works from 1946 to 1947.

In 1971, he published a book called Una Época de historia en Caricaturas. The book contained a collection of his works from 1948 to 1963. Eliseo Combas Guerra, wrote the prologue, selected the cartoons and annotated the work for the book, which was published by Editorial Universitaria of the University of Puerto Rico.

Filardi's published books
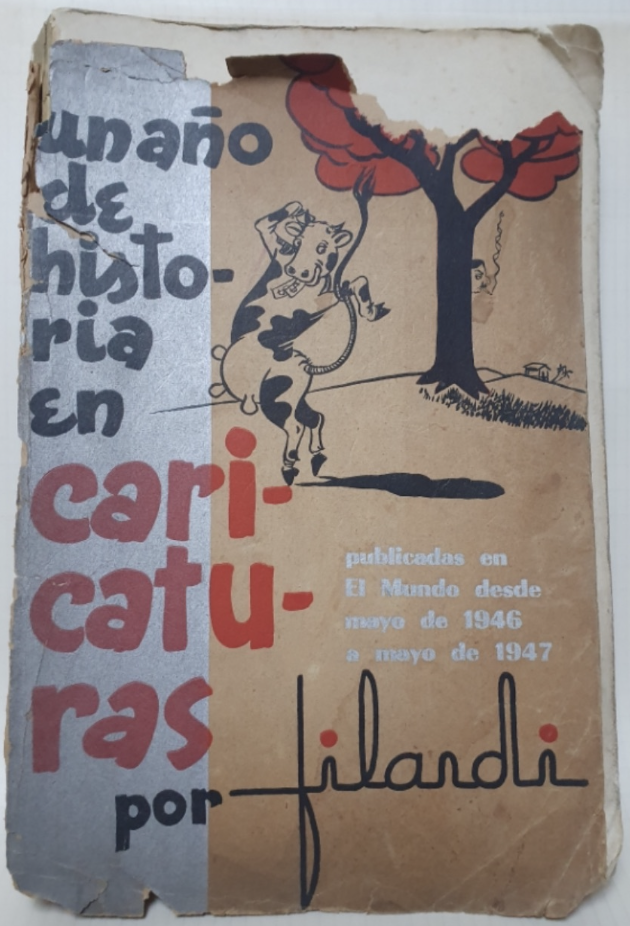
Cover of Filardi's first book: Un año de historia en caricaturas (1947)

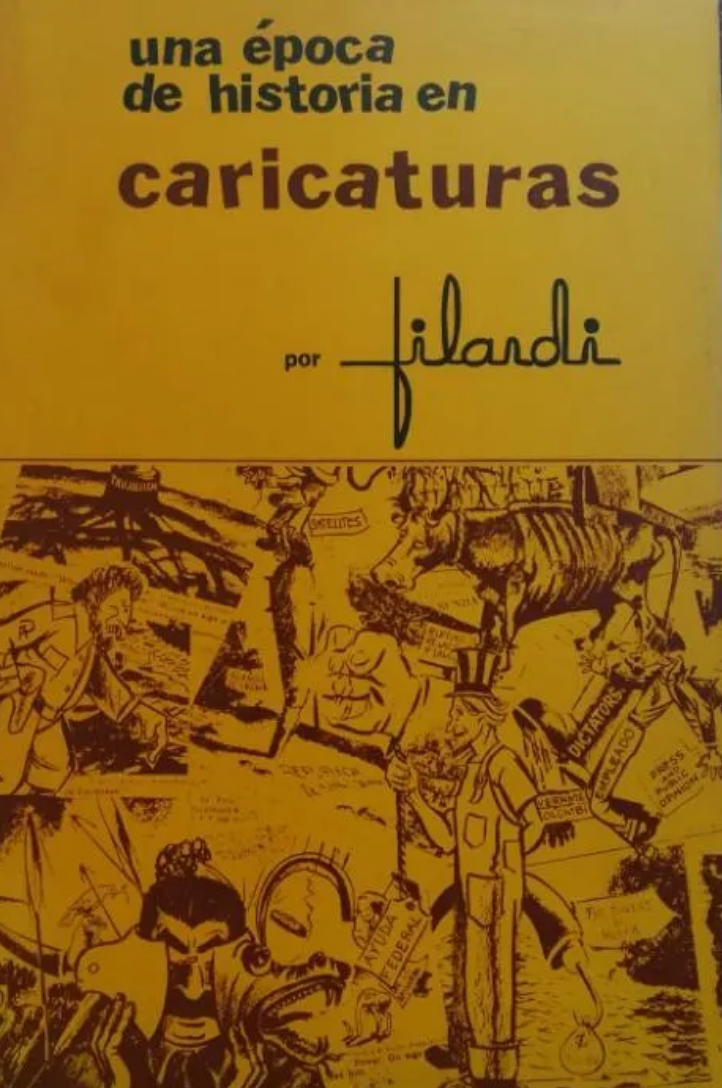
Cover of Filardi's second book: Una Época de historia en Caricaturas (1971)

His cartoons which featured life and events about Puerto Rico include one when José Ferrer, a Puerto Rican actor won an Oscar.

Filardi's works and cultural influences have been featured and discussed in numerous books, publications and national archives such as:

- Women, Creole Identity, and Intellectual Life in Early Twentieth-century by Magali Roy Féquière
- Harry S. Truman library & museum
- Journal of the Center for Puerto Rican Studies(Vol. 20, Issue 1)
- Así es la vida (That's Life) by "Joaquín" Jack Delano
- Medios y resistencia en la era muñocista: el periódico El Mundo y la caricatura de Filardi ante el proyecto histórico del Partido Popular Democrático, 1950–1960 by Rafael L. Cabrera Collazo
- Los dibujos del progreso: el mundo caricaturesco de Filardi y la crítica al desarrollismo muñocista 1950–1960 by Rafael L. Cabrera Collazo
- Recordando a Carmelo Filardi (Remembering Carmelo Filardi) by Helga I. Serrano
- Horizontes by S. Damary Burgos
- Abriendo Puertas by José Giovannetti
- Sources for the Study of Puerto Rican History: A Challenge to the Historian's Imagination by Blanca Silvestrini-Pacheco and Maria de los Angeles Castro Arroyo
- Activismo, literatura y cambio social en el Caribe Hispano: aproximación en tres movimientos by María Alejandra Aguilar-Dornelles
- Historia del Humor Gráfico en Puerto Rico by Arturo Yépez
- Analizarán el impacto de la caricatura y la sátira by Inter News Service
- El caso del señor Carmelo Filardi
- Luis Negrón López Rescatado por la historia by Héctor Luis Acevedo
- Salón de Humorismo | Exhibición 40/30
- DESTILANDO CAÑA: Resistência e rumclandestino na ilha de Porto Rico by José Manuel González Cruz
- Antología del olvido by Eugenio Ballou

There is a Carmelo Filardi Medal award.

Filardi is related to the family which built the Filardi House. His father was Vicente Filardi, the primary builder. His older brothers Juan Bautista and Domingo were also contributors. The professional tennis player Alex Llompart Filardi is also related to Carmelo Filardi.

== See also ==
- Filardi House
- Filardi surname
