= Carapichaima =

- Town
- Location within Trinidad and Tobago
- Coordinates: 10°28′N 61°27′W
- Country: Trinidad and Tobago
- Region: Couva-Tabaquite-Talparo

Population (2011)
  - Total: 4,465

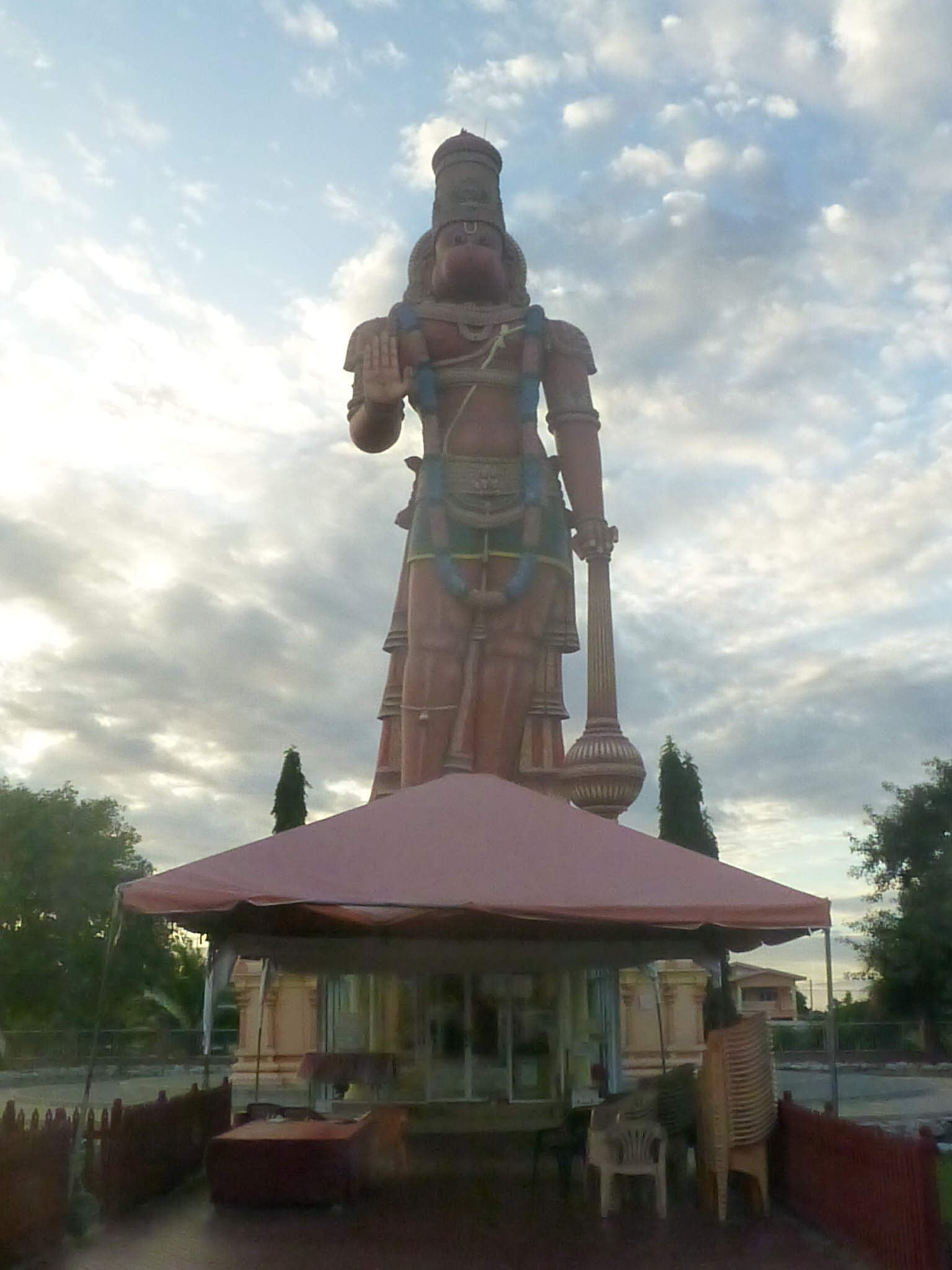
Karyasiddhi Hanuman statue, Carapichaima is the largest statue of Hanuman in the Western Hemisphere.

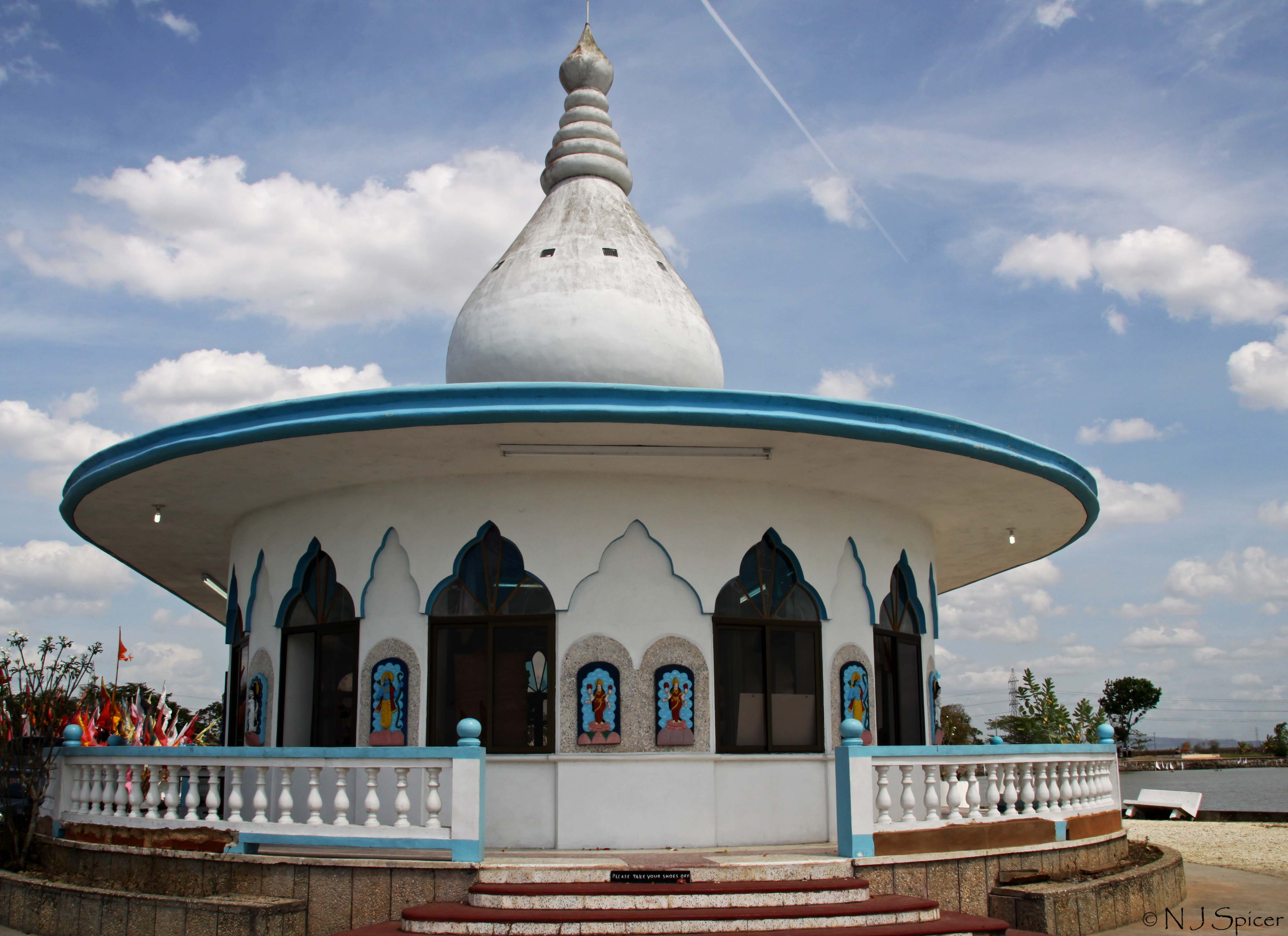
Temple in the Sea

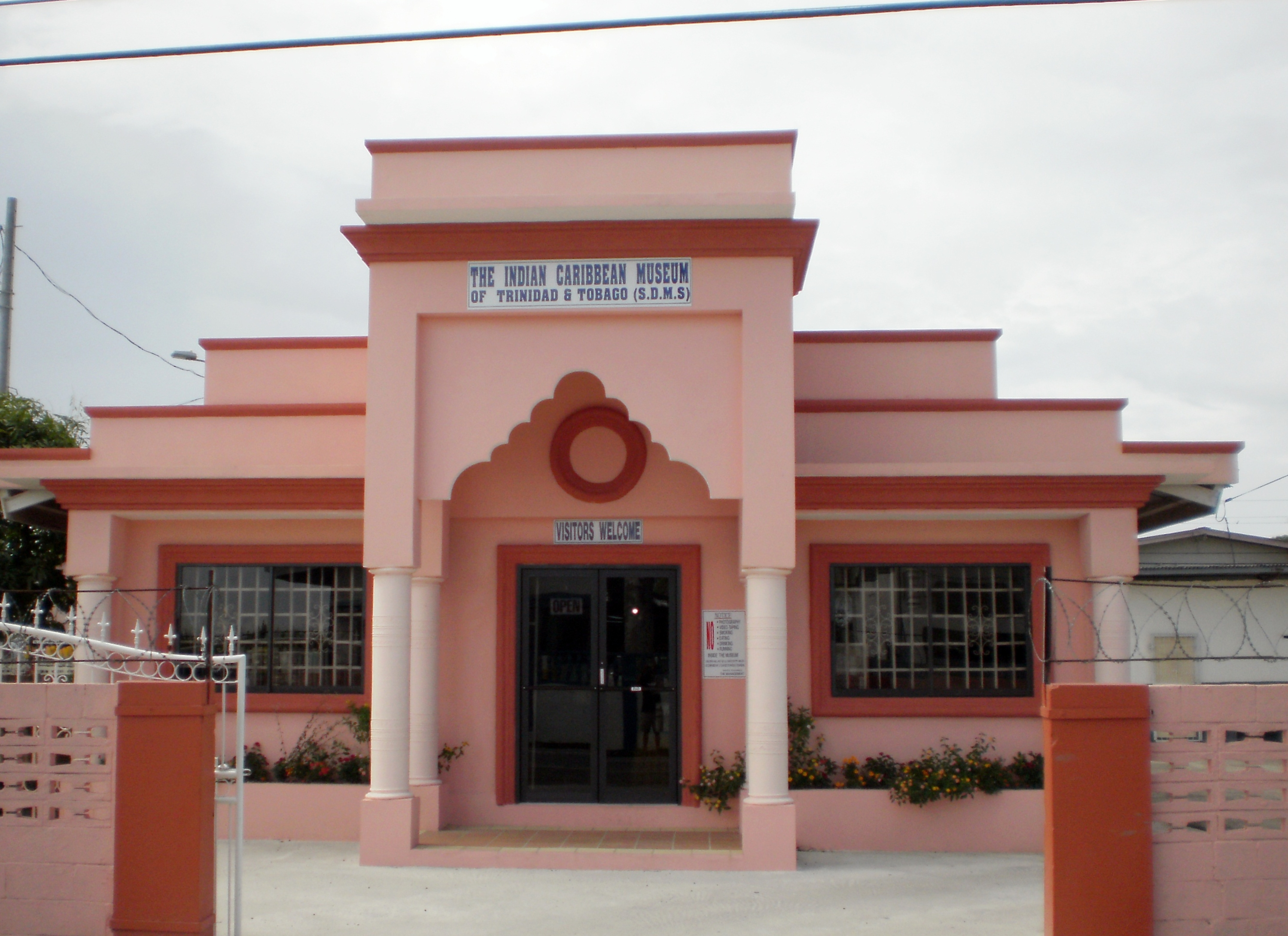
Indian Caribbean Museum of Trinidad and Tobago

Carapichaima is a town in central Trinidad, Trinidad and Tobago. Communities and villages in Carapichaima include Orangefield, Waterloo, Brickfield, and Korea Village.

== History ==
Carapichaima had been a sugar producing village that expanded after the railroad opened up central Trinidad to development and population movements. Better access to transportation allowed the village to expand into a hub for transportation in central Trinidad and center for commerce for the surrounding areas and rural communities.

Carapichaima has seen major changes and growth due to a number of factors. These include the construction of new schools in the area, the establishment and expansion of business into the area and the increase in tourism into the area.

Major structural changes occurred in the past few years when the main sugar producing, state owned company, Caroni 1975 Ltd., was closed in 2003. A significant part of the rural population were employed in the sugar industry. Among some of the major problems plaguing this community is increasing crime rates and difficulty coping with the previously mentioned structural changes.

== Religion ==
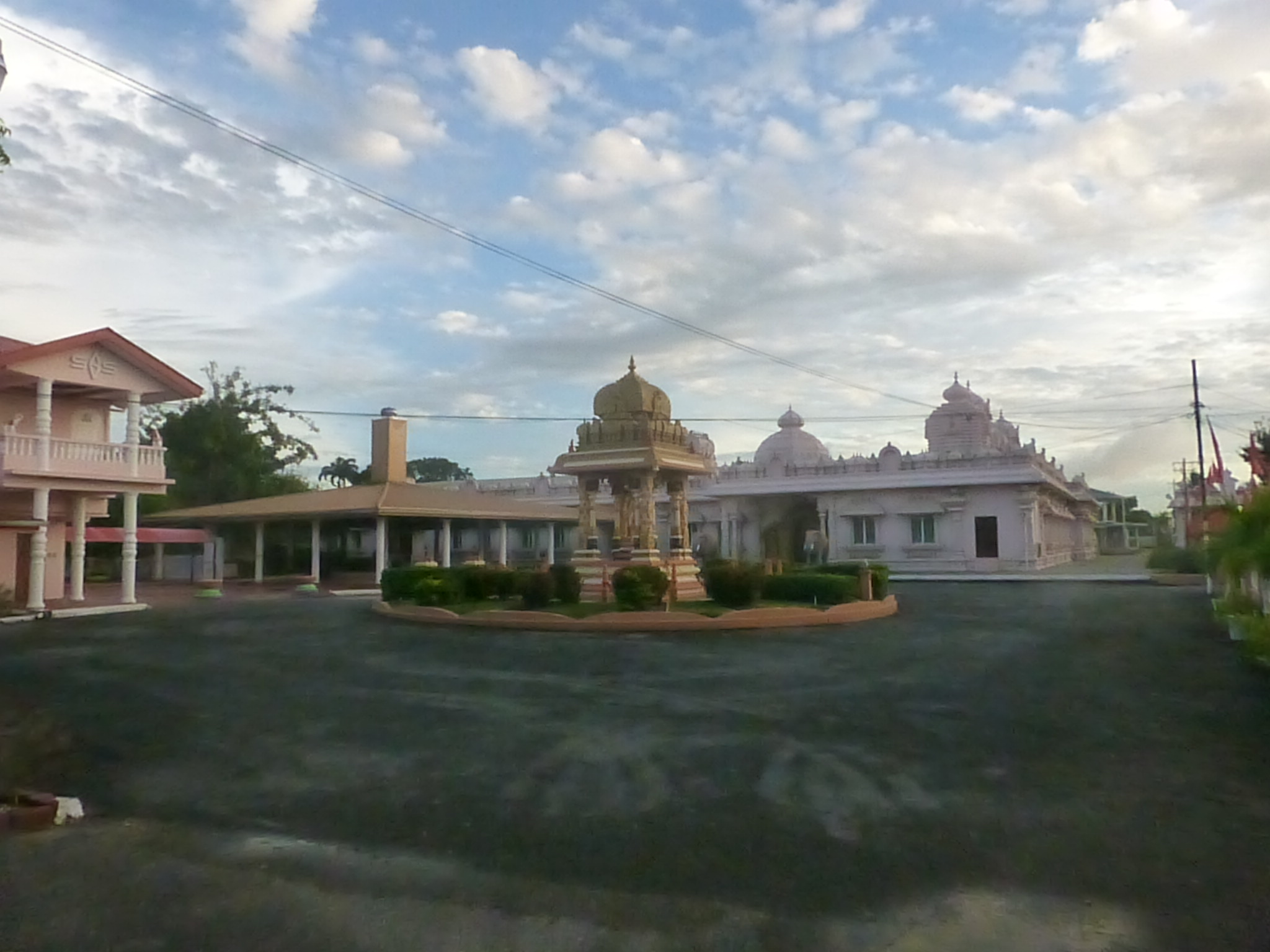
Dattatreya Mandir

The town is very culturally diverse hosting a very large East Indian population as well as a significant African population. The predominantly East Indian population explains the dominance of religions like Hinduism and Islam in the area. This dominance is evident by the amount of Temples and Mosques located in the area. The Dattatreya Mandir is a Hindu temple dedicated to Ganapathi Sachchidananda. Situated on the temple ground is the tallest (85 feet) Lord Hanuman statue in the Western Hemisphere completed in 2001. The statue was designed and constructed by T. Subramanian Sthapathi (Chief Architect) from Chennai. Also of significance is the temple in Waterloo, which extends into the sea. Several Mosques dot the area and a Muslim school is centrally located close to the former train station. A number of churches also exist to serve the growing Christian population in Carapichaima. Carapichaima has been a major staging point for Carnival celebrations in Central Trinidad.

== Schools ==
A number of schools have sprouted in the area to accommodate its rising population. One of the first was the Canadian Missionary school, the Waterloo Presbyterian School. This was originally built to educate the rural East Indians who lived and formed the workforce of the sugar plantations that encompassed the region at that time. Eventually a number of schools were established like the Waterloo Hindu School, Orange Field Hindu School, Carapichaima RC School and the Carapichaima ASJA Muslim Primary School to name a few.
