= National Library Service of Barbados =

Coordinates: 13°06′01″N 59°36′55″W

National Library Service
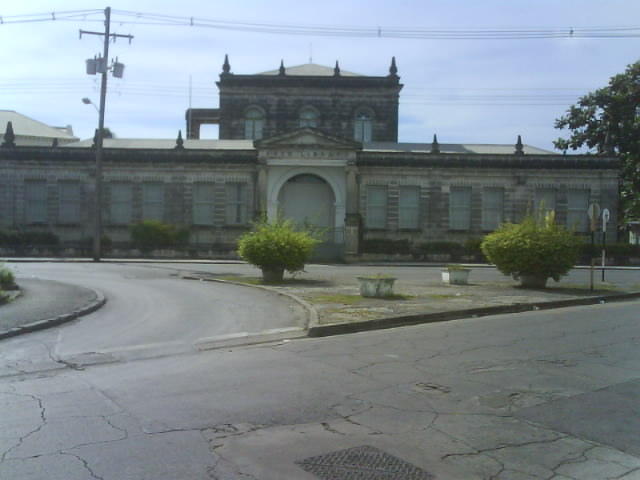
- Main branch of Barbados National Library Service
- Location: St. Michael, Bridgetown, Barbados
- Type: Public Library of Barbados
- Established: 1847
- Branches: 9

Collection
- Items collected: business directories, phone books, maps, government publications, books, periodicals, genealogy, local history

Other information
- Website: library.gov.bb

The National Library Service of Barbados is the government supported public-library service in the nation of Barbados. Headquartered in the capital-city Bridgetown, the main branch was located on Coleridge Street. It was constructed between 1903 and 1906, funded by a grant donated by Scottish-American philanthropist, Andrew Carnegie.

== Background ==
The public library act was passed on October 24, 1847, with a collection of books being made accessible to the public exactly two years later. It wasn't until 1903 that the Coleridge Street library, the first permanent home for the collection started construction, and this opened to the public in 1906.

The main branch on Coleridge Street is a coral-stone building, built in the style of the English Renaissance. The library held and preserved in both print and non-print formats an impressive collection of Barbadiana dating back to the 18th century.

The library in Bridgetown and another eight branches across the island offer registered membership to all Barbadians and visitors. The first of the other branches opened on February 23, 1905 at Speightstown.

The National Library Service is managed by the government.

== Branches ==
The library has nine branches in total across the island, established between 1905 and 2009.

- Coleridge Street, Bridgetown (temporarily housed at Fairchild Street)
- Eagle Hall
- Valley, St. George
- Six Cross Roads, St. Philip
- Gall Hill, St. John
- Tamarind Hall, St. Joseph
- Speightstown
- Holetown
- Oistins

== Restoration ==
The Carnegie Free Library on Coleridge Street was closed in August 2006 for much needed renovations after 100 years of service to Bridgetown and its environs. The Library was moved to a building on Independence Square until such time that renovations could be completed. As of 2025, the library still remains at the temporary location.

== See also ==
- List of national and state libraries
- List of Carnegie libraries in the Caribbean
