= Carnival Road March =

Song played at carnivals

The Carnival Road March is the musical composition played most often at the "judging points" along the parade route during a Caribbean Carnival. Originating as part of the Trinidad and Tobago Carnival, the term has been applied to other Caribbean carnivals. There it was and is still viewed as a musical genre.

In Trinidad and Tobago the Road March title has been officially given out every year since 1932 (with the exception of the years affected by World War II when Carnival did not officially take place). Popular Unofficial Road Marches have also been recognized in T&T since 1834 after slavery was abolished. Prior to World War II, T&T Road Marches were referred to as "Leggos" or "Breakaways" by the general population but were rebranded by the Carnival authorities as the Road March from 1946. Scoring is based upon a register-and-count system devised by a Carnival committee before the start of the parade.

After a German pop song "Happy Wanderer" by the Obernkirchen Children's Choir won the Trinidad & Tobago Road March title in 1955 the rules were amended to restrict songs eligible to be in the road march competition to only songs vocalized by local Trinidad & Tobago artists. The Road March title is among the most prestigious in Trinidad Carnival. The most such titles are Machel Montano with twelve wins, ahead of the late Lord Kitchener with eleven wins, Super Blue with ten wins, and the Mighty Sparrow with eight wins. In the mid-1970s, a woman officially broke through in the male dominated Calypso arena. Calypso Rose was the first female to officially win the Trinidad and Tobago Road March competition in 1977 with her song "Give More Tempo". The following year 1978 with "Come Leh We Jam" in addition to winning the Road March title again, Calypso Rose also won the "Calypso King" competition, the first time a woman had received that award. As a result, the "Calypso King" competition was officially renamed the "Calypso Monarch" competition to take into account that females also take part and have won titles.

First Calypso recordings were made in 1912 so Trinidad & Tobago Road Marches prior to 1912 were not recorded that year but may have been recorded years later after recording technology became available to Calypso pioneers of the 1910s to 1930s. In 2019 Skinny Fabulous of St. Vincent & the Grenadines created history by becoming the second foreign artiste (after the German Obernkirchen Children's Choir) and the very first foreign soca artiste to win the prestigious Trinidad & Tobago Road March title with a song called "Famalay" which was vocalized by Skinny Fabulous, Machel Montano and Bunji Garllin.

== Trinidad and Tobago ==
Below are over 100 T&T Road Marches starting from this year going back to the 1800s when most calypsos were sung in patois.

Year	Performer	Song	Album / Notes
2026	Machel Montano	”Encore"	12th Road March win
2025	Machel Montano	"Pardy"	11th T&T Road March win
2024	Mical Teja	"DNA"	HOME / 1st T&T RM win
2023	Bunji Garlin	“Hard Fete"	2nd T&T RM win
2022	None due to COVID-19 Pandemic (Restricted Carnival activities)		
2021	Farmer Nappy	“Backyard Jam" (Online Road March)	No Carnival.
2020	Neil “Iwer” George & Kes Dieffenthaller	“Stage Gone Bad" (also won ISM)	2nd & 1st T&T RM wins
2019	Skinny Fabulous, Machel Montano & Bunji Garlin	"Famalay"	G.O.A.T / 1st, 10th & 1st T&T RM wins
2018	Machel Montano & Superblue	"Soca Kingdom"	9th & 10th T&T RM wins
2017	Ultimate Rejects featuring MX Prime	"Full Extreme" (also won Panorama)	1st T&T RM win
2016	Machel Montano	"Waiting On the Stage"	Monk Evolution
2015	Machel Montano	"Like Ah Boss" (also won ISM)	Monk Monte
2014	Machel Montano	"Ministry Of Road" (MOR) (also won ISM)	Happiest Man Alive
2013	Superblue	"Fantastic Friday" (also won ISM)	Soca Gold 2013
2012	Machel Montano	"Pump Yuh Flag" (PYF) (also won ISM)	Double M
2011	Machel Montano	"Advantage" (also won ISM)	The Return
2010	JW & Blaze	"Palance" (also won ISM)	Monkey Steak Play Soca
2009	Fay-Ann Lyons-Alvarez	"Meet Super Blue" (also won ISM)	
2008	Fay-Ann Lyons-Alvarez	"Get On"	Best Of Best Soca 2008
2007	Machel Montano	"Jumbie"	Book of Angels
2006	Machel Montano & Patrice Roberts	"Band Of De Year" (BODY)	B.O.D.Y.
2005	Shurwayne Winchester	"Dead or Alive"	
2004	Shurwayne Winchester	"The Band Coming"	Press Play
2003	Fay-Ann Lyons-Alvarez	"Display"	Soca Gold 2003 (3rd female winner)
2002	Naya George	"Trinidad"	Soca Gold 2002
2001	Shadow aka Mighty Shadow	"Stranger" (also won ISM)	Shadow - Just For You
2000	Superblue / Iwer George (TIE)	"Pump Up" / "Carnival Come Back Again"	Soca Matrix / Iwer & Family
1999	Sanell Dempster	"De River"	Blue Ventures 1999 (2nd female winner)
1998	Wayne Rodriguez	"Footsteps"	Charge
1997	Machel Montano	"Big Truck"	Heavy Duty (1st Road March win)
1996	Nigel Lewis	"Moving"	Performed live with his brother Marvin Lewis
1995	Superblue	"Signal For Lara"	Happy Carnival
1994	Preacher	"Jump and Wave"	Rattlesnake Wine
1993	Super Blue	"Bacchanal Time" (also won SM)	Bacchanal Time
1992	Super Blue	"Jab Jab" (Wine On Something)	In The Power
1991	Super Blue (formerly Blue Boy)	"Get Something and Wave"	10th Anniversary
1990	Tambu	"No No We Eh Going Home"	The Cry
1989	Tambu	"Free Up"	The Journey
1988	Tambu	"This Party Is It"	Culture
1987	Mighty Duke	"Is Thunder"	Yester, Today, Tomorrow
1986	David Rudder	"Bahia Gyal"	The Hammer
1985	Crazy	"Soucouyant"	Caribbean Hits Makers
1984	Sparrow	"Don't Back Back"	King Of The World
1983	Blue Boy	"Rebecca" (also won Panorama)	Superman
1982	Penguin	"Deputy"	Life Is A Lollipop
1981	Blue Boy	"Ethel"	Soca In Shaolin Temple
1980	Blue Boy	"Soca Baptist" (3rd soca to win RM)	Blueboy's breakout song (1st Road March win)
1979	Poser	"Ah Tell She" (Smoke Ah Watty)	2nd soca to win RM
1978	Calypso Rose	"Come Leh We Jam" (Soca Jam)	Her Majesty Calypso Rose (1st soca song to win RM)
1977	Calypso Rose	"Give More Tempo" (uptempo calypso)	Action Is Tight (1st official female winner)
1976	Kitchener	"Flag Woman" (soca style bassline)	Kitch: Home For Carnival (11th & final Road March win)
1975	Kitchener	"Tribute to Spree" (also won Panorama)	Carnival Fever In Kitch
1974	Shadow	"Bass Man"	Bass Man LP
1973	Kitchener	"Rain-O-Rama" (also won Panorama)	We Walk 100 Miles
1972	Sparrow	"Drunk and Disorderly"	Hotter Than Ever
1971	Kitchener	"Mas' At Madison"	Curfew Time With Kitch
1970	Kitchener	"Margie" (also won Panorama)	Sock It To Me Kitch
1969	Sparrow	"Sa Sa Yea"	16 Carnival Hits (Ice)
1968	Kitchener	"Miss Tourist"	Play Mas' With Kitch
1967	Kitchener	"Sixty Seven" (also won Panorama)	16 Carnival Hits (Ice)
1966	Sparrow	"Obeah Wedding" (also won Panorama)	Calypso Genius Vol.1
1965	Kitchener	"My Pussin"	Mr. Kitch (RCA Victor)
1964	Kitchener	"Mama This Is Mas" (also won Panorama)	Lord Kitchener (RCA)
1963	Kitchener	"The Road"	Klassic Kitchener Vol.2
1962	Lord Blakie	"Maria"	Trinidad All Time Calypso
1961	Sparrow	"Royal Jail"	Sparrow The Conqueror
1960	Sparrow	"Mae Mae"	Calypso King Of Trinidad
1959	Lord Caruso	"Run the Gunslingers"	Ten For The Road
1958	Sparrow	"Pay As You Earn"	16 Carnival Hits (Ice)
1957	Lord Christo / Nelson Cato	"Chicken Chest" / "Doctor Nelson"	Two competitions
1956	Sparrow	"Jean and Dinah" (Yankee's Gone)	Sparrow's breakout song (1st Road March win)
1955	Obernkirchen Children's Choir	"Happy Wanderer" (Valderi, Valdera!)	German singalong pop song
1954	Lord Blakie	"Steel Band Clash"	
1953	Vivian Comma / Spit Fire	"Madeline Oye" / "Bow Wow Wow"	Two competitions
1952	Spit Fire	"Post, Post Another Letter For Thelma"	
1951	Mighty Terror	"Tiny Davis Blow"	
1950	Mighty Killer	"In A Calabash"	
1949	Lord Wonder	"Ramgoat Baptism"	
1948	Lord Melody	"Canaan Barrow"	
1947	King Pharaoh	"Portuguese Dance" (Vishki Vashki Voo)	
1946	Kitchener	"Jump In The Line"	Competition re branded;1st official Road March win
1945	World War II (No Official Carnival): Roaring Lion	"(All Day All Night,) Mary-Ann"	Calypso Carnival (Decca)
1944	World War II (No Official Carnival): King Radio	"Brown Skin Girl"	
1943	World War II (No Official Carnival): Lord Invader	"Rum & Coca Cola"	Lord Invader Calypso
1942	World War II (No Official Carnival): Lord Kitchener	"Lai Fook Lee"	Kitchener's breakout hit song
1941	Lion (aka Roaring Lion)	"Whoopsin Whoopsin"	5th & final "Leggo" win
1940	Lord Beginner	"Run Yuh Run"	
1939	King Radio	"Mathilda"	Rough Guide To Calypso
1938	Lion (aka Roaring Lion)	"No Nora Darling"	4th consecutive win
1937	Lion (aka Roaring Lion)	"Netty Netty"	Roaring Lion Sacred 78's
1936	Lion (aka Roaring Lion)	"Advantage Could Never Done"	
1935	Lion (aka Roaring Lion)	"Dingolay Oy"	1st official "Leggo" win
1934	Railway Douglas	"After Johnny Drink Me Rum"	
1933	King Radio	"Wash Pan Wash"	
1932	King Radio	"Tiger Tom Play Tiger Cat"	1st official competition, 1st official "Leggo" champ
1931	King Houdini	"Mr. Huggins" (Remake)	
1930	Lord Inveigler	"Captain Cipriani"	
1929	Atilla The Hun	"Toddy"	
1928	Mentor	"Mr. Huggins"	
1927	Atilla The Hun	"???" (Song to be confirmed)	
1926	Sam Manning	"Camilla"	Sam Manning Volume 1
1925	King Houdini	"Fire Brigade Water the Road"	
1924	??? (Singer to be confirmed)	"Mavis Powder"	
1923	King Houdini	"Sly Mongoose"	
1922	Atilla The Hun	"Toddy"	
1921	Johnny Walker	"Go Way Gal"	
1920	Atilla The Hun	"Bigman Sweetman"	
1918	World War I (No Official Carnival)	(No winning "Breakaway/Leggo" song)	
1917	World War I (No Official Carnival)	(No winning "Breakaway/Leggo" song)	
1916	World War I (No Official Carnival)	(No winning "Breakaway/Leggo" song)	
1915	World War I (No Official Carnival)	(No winning "Breakaway/Leggo" song)	
1911	Lionel Belasco	"Poeme One"	
1907	Lionel Belasco	“L'Année Passée“ (English: "Last Year") Interpolates melody from Martiniquan folksong; Melody also used by Lord Invader in his 1943 hit "Rum & Coca Cola"	Sung in Patois & English
1906	Sophie Mataloney (aka Jamette Matador)	"Pauline" (Rework of Guadeloupan folksong)	Sung in Patois & English
1899	Chantwell	"Prisonié Lévéz" (Version of 1830s kaiso)	Sung in Patois & English
1897	Chantwell	"J'ouvert Band"	Sung in Patois & English
1834	Congo Barra (or other early Calypsonian)	"Point De Six Ans" (English: "No Six Years")	Protest Calypso in Patois

== Antigua and Barbuda ==
Year	Performer	Song	Album / Notes
2026	Ballo	"Bang E Line”	1st ever RM win
2025	Soca Villan	"BB Service”	2nd RM win
2024	Yung Vice & Newgen Band	"Gravity Falls”	1st ever RM win
2023	Ricardo Drue/ Psycho, Empress, Soca Villan/ Claudette Peters (TIE)	"Last Man Standing" ”Let It Rain” ”Nat U”	Three-way tie; each receiving 25 plays
2022	Lyricks Man	"How Ma Sound"	
2021	No Carnival	COVID-19	
2020	No Carnival	COVID-19	
2019	Low Rider	"Fish Dance"	
2018	Red Hot Nation	"Gallop"	
2017	Claudette CP Peters	"Out Deh"	First Female Winner
2016	Tian Winter	"In De Middle"	
2015	Boasta	"Ole time Something"	
2014	Menace	"Fete Me Ah Fete"	
2013	Ezzy Rattigan	"Golden Cup"	
2012	Burning Flames	"Kick Een She Back Door"	
2011	Hard Knaxx	"KFC (Kentucky)"	
2010	Burning Flames	"Bullbud"	
2009	Red Hot Flames	"Trademark"	
2008	Red Hot Flames	"Musical Bomb"	
2007	Burning Flames	"Papi"	
2006	Red Hot Flames	"Trouble"	
2005	Burning Flames	"De Harder Dey Come"	
2004	Burning Flames	"Road Rage"	
2003	Burning Flames	"Rush"	
2002	Wanskie	"More Gyal"	
2001	High Intensity	"Ole Time Something"	
2000	Calypso Jim	"Exercise"	
1999	Burning Flames	"I Command You"	
1998	Burning Flames	"Sweet Song"	
1997	Onyan	"Crazy Man"	
1996	Burning Flames	"Fire Unda Me Foot"	
1995	Burning Flames	"Gym Jam"	
1994	Vision Band ft Eddie Mello	"Dress Back"	
1993	Burning Flames	"Wet Down De Place"	
1992	Burning Flames	"Donkey"	
1991	Burning Flames	"Piece of Iron"	
1990	Burning Flames	"Congo Man"	
1989	Burning Flames	"Workey Workey"	
1988	Lion	"Bad Girl"	
1987	Short Shirt	"J'Ouvert Rhythm"	
1986	Burning Flames	"Rudeness Mek Me"	
1985	Burning Flames	"Stylie Tight"	
1984	Swallow	"Satan Coming Down"	
1983	Swallow	"Party In Space"	
1982	Short Shirt	"Push"	
1981	Redding	"Up and Jumping"	
1980	Short Shirt	"Summer Festival"	
1979	Short Shirt	"Kangaroo Jam"	
1978	Short Shirt	"Benna Music"	
1977	La Tumba	"Supa Jam"	
1976	Short Shirt	"Tourist Leggo"	
1975	Swallow	"Shake and Break You Bam Bam"	
1974	Short Shirt	"Lucinda"	
1973	Swallow	"Push Ya, Push Dy"	
1972	Swallow	"Pow Pow"	
1971	Razor Blade	"Shake You Waist"	
1970	Calypso Joe	"Bum Bum"	

== Barbados ==
Year	Performer	Song	Album / Notes
2026	Mikey	"Like Ah Bajan"	4th RM win
2025	Lead Pipe	"Tek Charge"	3rd RM win
2024	Brucelee Almightee x Noize Boyz	“Tomorrow"	2nd RM win
2023	Quan De Artist	“Waistline"	Pay The People Riddim
2022	Brucelee Almightee	"Mauby"	Red Dead Riddim
2021	No Crop Over	COVID-19	
2020	No Crop Over	COVID-19	
2019	Lead Pipe & Jus Jay	"Sometime"	
2018	Lil Rick	"Mudda Sally"	
2017	Stiffy	"Tip & Ben Ova"	
2016	Lil Rick	"Iz A Bajan"	
2015	Peter Ram	"All Ah We"	Get Soca 2016
2014	Lead Pipe & Saddis	"Ah Feeling"	
2013	Soca Kartel (Blood & Mikey)	"Roll It"	
2012	Mikey	"We Loose"	
2011	Edwin Yearwood	"Cova de Road"	
2010	Blood	"Foot On Fire"	
2009	Edwin Yearwood	"In Da Middle Of Da Road"	
2008	Edwin Yearwood	"Handle Yah Business"	
2007	Mr Dale	"Soka Junkie"	
2006	Jabae	"Flames"	
2005	Natahlee & Shontelle	"Colours"	
2004	Mikey	"Come Together"	
2003	Lil' Rick	"Mash Up & Buy Back"	
2002	Lil' Rick	"Hypa Dogg"	
2001	Krosfyah	"Sak Pase"	
2000	Rupee	"Jump"	
1999	Red Plastic Bag	"Volcano"	
1998	Grynner	"Grind Them"	
1997 [Tie]	Alison Hinds / Edwin Yearwood	"In The Meantime" / "Highway Robbery"	
1996	Alison Hinds	"Raggamuffin"	
1995	Edwin Yearwood	"Obadele"	
1994	Serenader	"Juck Fuh Juck"	
1993	Ras Iley	"Inez"	
1992	De Great Carew	"Mad Woman Jam"	
1991	Madd	"Tribute To Grynner"	
1990	Grynner	"Get Out The Way"	
1989	Grynner	"Leggo I Hand"	
1988	Grynner	"Wait For Me"	
1987	Red Plastic Bag	"Can't Find Me Brudda"	
1986	Ras Iley	"Spring Garden On Fire"	
1985	Grynner	"More Grynner"	
1984	Grynner	"Stinging Bees"	
1983	Grynner	"Mr T"	
1982	Mighty Gabby	"Jack"	
1981	Adonijah	"Ethiopian Rock"	
1980	Viper	"Ting Tong"	
1979	Mighty Gabby	"Burn Mister Harding"	

== Grenada ==
Grenada Carnival, also known as Spicemas, was founded to celebrate the anniversary of the independence of Grenada, Carriacou, and Petit Martinique, which gained their independence on 7 February 1974. In 1978 Grenada Carnival was moved to the month of May by the Eric Gairy led government but after that government was overthrown in March 1979, the 1979 Carnival celebration was cancelled. In 1980 the new People's Revolutionary Government (PRG) led by Maurice Bishop brought back Grenada Carnival, which was held in May that year. After a feasibility study Grenada Carnival was moved to August the following year. Hence annually from 1981 Grenada's Carnival has been held in August culminating with their Road March competition.

Year	Performer	Song	Album / Notes
2026	Lil Kerry	"Mayhem"	2nd RM Win
2025	Lil Kerry x Build De Vibes	"Bury All"	First RM Win
2024	Dash	"The Tape"	
2023	Temptress & Rabulous (TIE)	"Toot Toot & D Farmer "	
2022	Jab King	"High"	
2021	No Spice Mas	COVID-19	
2020	No Spice Mas	COVID-19	
2019	Runi Jay	"Diagnosis"	
2018	Lil Natty & Thunda	"Get In Your Section"	
2017	Lil Natty & Thunda	"Top Striker"	
2016	Lil Natty & Thunda	"Take It To Dem"	
2015	Synnah	"Jab on Sesame Street"	
2014	Squeeze Head	"Turbo Charge"	
2013	Boyzie	"Mas Everywhere"	
2012	Boyzie	"Born Troublesome"	
2011	Lavaman	"So We Dey"	
2010	Otis	"Tornado"	
2009	Mr. Killa	"Swing It Away"	
2008	Miney	"10,000 Masqueraders"	
2007	Berbice	"Traffic"	
2006	Soca Banton	"Over You Head"	
2005	Boogie B	"Clear The Smoke"	
2004	General PP	"Never Say Never"	
2003	Super P	"Do What You Want"	
2002	Japs	"Helicopter"	
2001	Tallpree	"Rags Invasion"	
2000	Tallpree	"Grave, Jail, Hospital"	
1999	Sheldon Douglas	"Find Something"	
1998	Sheldon Douglas	"Stamp Up"	
1997	Tangler	"Chala Baiti"	
1996	Tangler	"Bouncing Low"	
1995	Inspector	"Madness"	
1994	Inspector	"Sweeter Than Home"	
1993	Flying Cloud	"Way You Man"	
1992	Flying Cloud	"Raise You Hand"	
1991	Moss International	"Jambalesse Rule"	
1990	Ajamu	"Open Up"	
1989	Skylark	"Simple Policeman"	
1988	Black Wizard	"Soca Feeling"	
1987	Squeezy	"To Cork Ah Hole"	
1986	Inspector	"No Kicks"	
1985	Inspector	"Dance"	
1984	Flying Turkey	"Byron"	
1983	African Teller	"You Cock Ain’t Dey"	
1982	Snakey Boy	"Charmaine Darling"	
1981	Timpo	"We Want We Carnival"	

== St. Lucia ==
Invader has won the Road March in St. Lucia seven times. In a period from 1970 to 1972 and again from 1974 to 1976, Road March winners were imported from Trinidad and Tobago.

Year	Performer	Song	Album / Notes
2026	Andrew	"Biscuit"	Also won Piton Soca Starz
2025	Dezral x Jardel	"The Car"	Also won Soca Monarch,
2024	Ricky T	"Look Something To Talk About"	Also won Soca Monarch, 9th RM Win
2023	Imran Nerdy	"Clock Out"	Also won Soca Monarch
2022	Frost & 4-1 band	"Eat Man Money"	
2021	No Carnival	COVID-19	
2020	No Carnival	COVID-19	
2019	Edwin George	"Call My Mother For Me"	
2018	Krome Ft Nassis	"Bend Dong For De Hmm"	
2017	Ricky T	"Sully"	
2016	Mac 11	"Padnas"	
2015	Ricky T & Superman HD	"Perfect Storm"	
2014	J Mouse	"Hurt It"	
2013	Ricky T	"Mass Attack"	
2012	Soca Syco	"Gallop"	
2011	Ricky T	"Mad Ting"	
2010	DJ HP	"Pa Mele”	
2009	Ricky T	"Like a Jumbie"	
2008	Ricky T	"Wheel & Come Again"	
2007	Ricky T	"Pressure Boom"	
2006 [Tie]	Ricky T / Vertex Band	"Bring Your Container" / "My Pressure Up"	
2005	Nicole David	"Queen of the Jungle (Bounce)"	
2004	Alpha	"Down De Road"	
2003	X Man	"Pee Pee In Me Poo Poo"	
2002	Invader	"Bo Bee Wia Wea"	
2001	Invader	"Be Le Lesh"	
2000	Rootsy	"Hillary"	
1999	Invader	"Take My Money"	
1998	Jaunty	"Military Jam"	
1997	Twop Chance	"Hospital Burning"	
1996	Jaunty	"Bobolist'"	
1995	Jaunty	"We Shall Hop"	
1994	Stylist Black	"Okay Okay"	
1993	Jaunty	"Oh La Lay"	
1992	Invader	"Vievxe Nomme Sa La"	
1991 [Tie]	Invader / Buffalo	"Wine Down William Peter" / ”Manje”	
1990	Translator	"Ninja"	
1989	Educator	"Calypso Tyson"	
1988	Chippy	"One Bad Prick"	
1987	Inspector Red	"Zodi Zodi"	
1986	Ashanti	"Sufferer’s Song"	
1985	Invader	"Carnal Knowledge"	
1984	Shakey	"Twavay Mwen Vle"	
1983	Invader	"Yellow Man"	
1982	Get Through	"What De People Chanting"	
1981	Educator	"Mon Kon Arrow"	
1980	Jackson	"Guy Love Dance"	
1979	Barrie	"Sailor In The Band”	
1978	Pelay	"Sweet Suzette"	
1977	Prince	"Doh Smoke Dope"	
1973	Desper	"Popham ‘72"	
1969	Pelay	"Jump, Jump, Jump"	

== St. Vincent ==
Year	Performer	Song	Album / Notes
2026	Problem Child	"Party Time"	
2025	Problem Child	“Fraid Horn"	Power Pack Project
2024	Problem Child	“Carnival Jumbie"	Carnival Jumbies Experiment Project
2023	Fireman Hooper	"Madness"	
2022	Kemmy	"Daz the Call"	
2021	No Carnival	COVID 19	
2020	No Carnival	COVID 19	
2019	Luta	"Lehgo Ting"	
2018	Fimba	"Funky Business"	
2017	Problem Child	"Never Bow"	
2016	Hypa 4000	"No Behaviour"	
2015	Hypa 4000	"Dutty Dancing"	
2014	Fireman Hooper	"Unruly"	
2013	Skinny Fabulous	"The General"	
2012	Fya Empress	"Rum Please"	
2011	Gao	"The Sheep	
2010	Maddzart	"The King Road"	
2009	Problem Child	"Mad House"	
2008	Icon	"Two Knees"	
2007	Problem Child	"Party Animal"	
2006	Jamesy P & Skarpyon	"Leave Me Alone"	
2005	DJ Twenty & Poorsah	"Googa Googa"	
2004	Bomani	"I Am Soca"	
2003	Poorsah	"Sling Shot"	
2002	Poorsah	"Chook It”	
2001	Poorsah	"Hairy Bank"	
2000	Touch	"Take Away"	
1999	Becket	"Small Pin"	
1998	Becket	"Tone Up"	
1997	Rebels	"Rumping"	
1996	New Direction	"Rudeness on the Road"	
1995	Touch	"Macco"	
1994	Touch	"Butt"	
1993	Touch	"Kangaroo"	
1992	Touch	"Puss Man"	
1991	Touch	"Move Yo Front"	
1990	Becket	"Teaser"	
1989	Touch	"Jam Dem"	
1988	Poorsah	"Mouth in Me Moma"	
1987	Becket	"Ten Years"	
1986	Becket	"Ah Want Soca"	
1985	Becket	"Tone"	
1984	Man CP	"Rhythm Colour"	
1983	Poorsah	"Right Up In Dey"	
1982	Scakes	"Mambo in De Disco"	
1981	Asterisks	"Yuh Can’t Wine"	
1980	Becket	"Cocoa"	
1978	Becket	"Wine Down Kingstown"	
1977	Mighty Gringo	"Don’t Lock Me Up"	
1976	King Brooklyn	"Largo Heights Busy Heights"	
1975	Mighty Gringo	"Leggo Me Hand"	
1974	Mighty Toiler	"The Puppy"	
1973	Lord Hawke	"Ding Dong"	
1972	Lord Hawke	"Oupane"	
1971	Lord Hawke	"Sweeeter That This"	

== Saint Kitts and Nevis ==
Year	Performer	Song	Album / Notes
2025	Nu Vybes Band	"Homecoming"	
2024	Kollision Band	"Keys To The City"	
2023	Small Axe Band x Ras Kelly	"Showcase"	
2022	Grand Masters	"Outside Again"	
2021	No Sugar Mas		
2020	No Sugar Mas		
2019	Grand Masters	"Lift Off De Stress"	
2018	Small Axe Band	"Get Jiggy Wid It"	
2017	Small Axe Band	"Puppy Song"	
2016	Grand Masters	"Wuk U Shift"	
2015	Small Axe Band	"Pepper Dem"	
2014	Small Axe Band	"Bottoms in de Road"	
2013	Small Axe Band	"We Got De Hardware"	
2012	Small Axe Band	"Do The DCH"	
2011	Grand Masters	"None a Dem (Step Pon Dem)"	
2010	King Konris	"Unstoppable Force"	
2009	Grand Masters	"Bust U Bubble"	
2008	Grand Masters	"A Want Whale"	
2007	Grand Masters	"Boom Boom Bam"	
2006	Small Axe Band	"Masquerade"	
2005	Nu Vybes	"Ting Lang"	
2004	Grand Masters	"Money Wutt"	
2003	Small Axe Band	"Watch De Creep Up"	
2002	Nu Vybes	"Step Up"	
2001	Nu Vybes	"Sugar"	
2000	Small Axe Band	"Shub Back On De"	
1999	Grand Masters	"Millenium Jam"	
1998	Grand Masters	"Masters' Massive"	
1997	Nu Vybes	"Street Style"	
1996	Nu Vybes	"Hand Signal"	
1995	Pungwa	"Stranded Night"	
1994	A U Brown	"Fan Me"	
1992	Ellie Matt	"Jump"	
1991	Mic Stokes	"All Kinda Tings"	
1990	Small Axe	"Pan Man"	
1989	Small Axe	"Who is De Dan"	
1988	Small Axe	"Big League"	
1987	Grand Masters	"Masters' Jam"	
1986 [Tie]	De Coach / Contender	"De Boops" / "Living in De Band"	
1985	Mic Stokes	"One Shot Man"	
1984	Shango	"Chin Chin Bar"	
1982	Ellie Matt	"Patsy"	
1981	Starshield	"Hooray Mass"	
1980	Ranger	"Seven Day Mass"	
1979	Ellie Matt	"Tune for De Children"	
1978	Ellie Matt	"Sugar City Jam"	
1977	Ellie Matt	"Shang Shang"	
1976	Ellie Matt	"Jam Back"	
1975	Arrow	"Rummy Song"	
1974	Mark the First	"Come Forward"	
1973	Ellie Matt	"All Day, All Night"	
1972	Controller	"Right On"	
1971	Sundar Popo	"Play You Mas"	Trinidadian artiste and song

== St. Thomas, US Virgin Islands ==
The Jam Band, formerly Eddie and the Movements has won the Road March Title a record 21 times.

Year	Performer	Song	Album / Notes
2025	Spectrum Band	"Carnival Is We"	
2024	Spectrum Band	"V.I. People"	
2023	Karnage (Formerly Poizon Band)	"Shake Up"	
2022	No Road March		
2021	No Carnival		
2020	No Carnival		
2019	Pressure Buss Pipe	"Do It & Done"	
2018	Spectrum Band	"Cyah Mash Up Carnival"	
2017	Spectrum Band	"My Life"	
2016	Spectrum Band	"I Don't Care"	
2015	Spectrum Band	"Left Right Stop Wukup"	
2014 [Tie]	Spectrum Band / Volume International XL	"Manners" / "Recipe"	
2013	Spectrum Band	"Wake Up To Wuk Up"	
2012	Spectrum Band	"V.I. Party"	
2011	Spectrum Band	"Boom"	
2010	Spectrum Band	"Kallaloo"	
2009	Jam Band	"Sickness"	
2008	JDPP Jammerz	"Bedrock"	
2007	JDPP Jammerz	"Bunny Train"	
2006	Whadablee	"Steel Pan Comin Up Deh Road"	
2005	Jam Band	"How To Take De Road"	
2004	Jam Band	"Soldiers"	
2003	Jam Band	"Jockey"	
2002	Alwyn Baptiste Jr & Pat Raguette of the Xpress Band	"Happy Birthday Carnival"	
2001	Jam Band	"Tear Down De Roof"	
2000	Jam Band	"Inspection Lane"	
1999	Jam Band	"Iron"	
1998	Whadablee	"This One is for Milo"	
1997	Jam Band	"Road Runner"	
1996	Jam Band	"Time For Wuk"	
1995	Jam Band	"Man Terrible"	
1994	Jam Band	"Showtime"	
1993	Jam Band	"Possessed"	
1992	Imaginations Brass	"All Out Posse"	
1991	Jam Band	"Let Loose"	
1990	Jam Band [Formerly Eddie and the Movements]	"Horse Chip"	
1989	Eddie and the Movements	"We Run Things"	
1988	Eddie and the Movements	"Kool Um Down"	
1987	Eddie and the Movements	"Legal"	
1986	Eddie and the Movements	"Lamboushay"	
1985	Eddie and the Movements	"Pepper"	
1984	Eddie and the Movements	"Tramping Style"	
1983	Mandingo Brass	"Traffic Tight"	
1982	Mandingo Brass	"Off Man Jam"	
1981	Eddie and the Movements	"Backbone"	
1980	Dread Ones	"Hey Hey Hey"	
1979	Mandingo Brass	"Man For She"	
1978 [Tie]	Ellie Matt and the G.I. Brass / Mandingo Brass	"Shang Shang / Winey Eva Mae"	

== Anguilla ==
Year	Performer	Song	Album / Notes
2025	Pantha Vibes International	"Kross"	
2024	Pantha Vibes International	"I Ain't Missing It"	
2023	Latest x XHD	"Sing Nah"	
2022	Latest x XHD & PNDRN	"Say It With Your Chest"	
2021	No Summer Festival	COVID-19	
2020	No Summer Festival	COVID-19	
2019	Exodus HD	"De Ting Start"	
2018	Exodus HD	"Dancing"	
2017	Infusion XL	"Look Me Over Here"	Levels Up
2016	Exodus HD	"Gone too far"	
2015	Exodus HD	"Hello"	Thrillogy
2014	Exodus HD	"Wash & Rinse"	De Encore
2013	Exodus HD [Formerly Exodus Band]	"For Di Fans Dem"	For Di Fans Dem
2012	Pantha Vibes International	"On De Road (My Riddim)"	
2011	Pantha Vibes International	"I Love PVI"	
2010	Pantha Vibes International	"Make It Rain"	
2009	Exodus Band [Currently Exodus HD]	"Cut Them Off"	
2008	Pantha Vibes International	"We want Action"	
2007	Better Band	"Keep Movin"	
2006	Better Band	"Jam-A-Robics"	
2005	Better Band	"Imagine"	
2004	Better Band	"Toss Up"	
2003	Mussington Brothers	"Dust Dem"	
2002	Mussington Brothers	"Dig Um"	
2001	AXA Band	"Caribbean Mass"	
2000	Better Band	"Misbehave"	
1999	Better Band (Formerly Vito)	"Soggy"	
1998	Vito	"Raise De Roof"	
1997	AXA Band	"On De Track"	
1996	North Sound	"Year 2000"	
1995	Mussington Brothers	"J’ouvert Slammer"	
1994	Mussington Brothers	"Hold Ya Balance"	
1993	Mussington Brothers	"Jam Up"	
1992	Mussington Brothers	"It’s A Business"	
1991	Mussington Brothers	"In De Valley"	
1990	Lord Anything	"Tired Bodies"	

== United Kingdom ==
Year	Performer	Song	Album / Notes
2016	Sunshine & Nadiva	"Unstoppable"	
2015	TriniBoi Joocie	"Mawd"	
2014	TriniBoi Joocie	"Must Be In Dat"	
2013	Soca Johnny	"Don't Do Me That"	
2012	Chardanai	"See Mi On The Road"	
2011	Chardanai	"Down Deh"	
2010	Soca Johnny	"Madness"	
2009	Soca Johnny	"Disorganise"	

== See also ==
- Caribbean music
