= St. Kitts Music Festival =

St. Kitts Music Festival Logo

The St. Kitts Music Festival is a festival of popular music held annually in June on the Caribbean islands of St. Kitts. The festival was originally called the Shak Shak Festival, and was first held in 1996. The first Festival featured Arrow, Nigel Lewis, Roy Cape Band, Krosfyah, Nu Vybes and the Small Axe Band, as well as the Su Wen-Ching Chinese Ensemble.

== 2007 line-up ==
Thursday 21 June 2007 (Soca/Calypso Night)

- Alison Hinds
- Machel Montano
- Crazy and The Lejah Band
- Small Axe Band
- Better Band
- King Konris and Queen Anastasia
- Royaltiez Band
- Highlights

Friday 22 June 2007 (Reggae/Dancehall Night)

- Pan Tribute to the Boots (The man that introduced Steel Pan to St. Kitts)
- Pluto Shervington
- Tessanne Chin
- Richie Stephens
- Lady Saw
- Steel Pulse
- Sean Paul
- Highlights

Saturday 23 June 2007 (R&B/Hip hop and Soul)

- Jazzique

== 2008 line-up ==
The 2008 St. Kitts Music Festival will take place at Warner Park on the island of St. Kitts from June 26 to 28, 2008. All concerts begin at 8:00 p.m. Admission is EC $135 or US$50 per night.

Thursday, June 26

- Kassav
- Calypso Rose
- Shadow
- El-A-Kru Featuring Tizzy
- Roy Cape All Stars
- Shurwayne Winchester
- The Grandmasters Band
- Nu Vybes Band International

Friday, June 27

- Billy Ocean
- Macka Diamond
- Pluto Shervington
- Ernie Smith
- Boris Gardiner
- Pressure
- Busy Signal
- Mykal Somer
- Kasanova Band

Saturday, June 28

- John Legend
- Ja Rule
- Mario
- Russell Thompkins, Jr. and the New Stylistics
- Kenrick Georges and the Bits & Pieces
- Paul Peress All Stars
- Brenda Russell
- Phil Perry
- Tom Scott
- Tah Mac
- Maxi Priest
- Ne-Yo
- Michael Bolton
- Big Boi
