= Caribbean Rising =

2005 concert tour

- Tour by MTV Networks
- Associated album: Various
- Start date: October 15, 2005
- End date: November 5, 2005
- Legs: 1
- No. of shows: 7 in North America

Caribbean Rising Tour was a concert tour hosted by MTV Networks. It featured performances by more than eighty artists across several different musical genres including reggae, dancehall, reggaeton, soca, quelbe, hip hop, and calypso. The concert series was held in conjunction with the launch of Tempo Networks, which debuted "in 20 Caribbean markets, providing both original and acquired programming." The channel launched in the United States in 2006. The tour featured performances by mainstream artists such as Rihanna, The Game, Musiq Soulchild, Elephant Man, Wyclef Jean and Ivy Queen, among others.

== Background ==
In October 2005, it was announced that MTV Networks would launch a "new cable television network devoted to Caribbean music and culture." In conjunction with the launch on November 21, MTV Networks announced the concert tour Caribbean Rising to be held in various countries in the Caribbean.

== Tour dates ==
Date	City	Country	Venue	Performing artists
North America
October 15, 2005		Jamaica		I Wayne, Luciano, Morgan Heritage, Jimmy Cliff, Richie Spice, T.O.K., Turbulence, Barrington Levy, Musiq Soulchild, Sasha, Toots & the Maytals, Marlon Binns, Bushman, Selah, Cherine Anderson, Sparkles, Swamp King, Gary "GQ" Hardie, Doneisha Prendergast, Erica "Milk" Sewell
October 16, 2005	St. Mary	Jamaica		Wayne Marshall, Assassin, Bounty Killa, Elephant Man, Kiprich, Lady Saw, Leftside & Esco, The Game, Voicemail, Vybz Kartel, Mario, Stone Love, Razz & Biggy
October 21, 2005	Christ Church	Barbados	The Plantation Garden Theatre	Natalie Burke & Chantal, Little Rick, Krosfyah, Edwin Yearwood, David Kirton, Allison Hinds, Johnnie King, Rihanna, Rupee, Arturo Tappin, Statement, Kimberly Innis, Toni Norville
October 25, 2005		St. Maarten		Elvis White, Mix Master Pauly, Band Mix, Sweet Mickey, Ebony & Steelpan Orchestra, Control Band, King Beau Beau, Youth Wave, Pedrin Pacheco & Su Orchestra, Mighty Dow and Super Mix Band
October 27, 2005		St. Croix		Stanley & 10 Sleepless Nights, Xpress, Ebenezer Methodist Steel Pan, Ricardo Richards Steel Pan, Extaushaun, Machel Montano, Midnight Youth Wave
October 30, 2005		Nevis		Masud Sadiki, Pepper Ranks, King Meeko, Kasanova, Crucial Banks, Marcia Griffiths, Morgan Heritage, Beres Hammond, Luciano, Angie Stone, Ivy Queen, Wyclef Jean
November 5, 2005	Port of Spain	Trinidad and Tobago	Queen's Park Savannah	H2O Flow, Maximus Dan, Shurwayne Winchester & Traffik, Bunji Garlin & Asylum, Doug E. Fresh, Machel Montano, Xtatik
