= Shurwayne Winchester =

- Born: Shurwayne Winchester; 8 February 1974 (age 52)
- Origin: Scarborough, Tobago, Trinidad and Tobago
- Genres: Soca
- Occupations: Musician, producer, Song-writer
- Instrument: Vocals
- Years active: 1996–present
- Formerly of: Y.O.U.- Yes One Unit
- Website: www.shurwayne.com

Shurwayne Winchester is a Tobagonian soca musician from The Republic of Trinidad and Tobago, who has twice won the Road March title.

== Biography ==
He was born on 8 February 1974 and was raised in Tobago. When he was 12, he began competing in local calypso competitions, and consistently placed within the top three. In 1990, he began competing against veteran performers, including Calypso Queen Denyse Plummer and Calypso Monarchs Cro Cro and Luta.

Winchester has won numerous Calypso Monarch and Road March titles. In 2004, having already made a name for himself with tracks such as "Baby Love" and "Under My Spell", he won the Road March title in 2004 with "The Band Coming". In 2005 he won again with "Dead or Alive".

In 2006 when he won both the Power and Groovy soca Monarch titles with "Can't Wait" and "Don't Stop". He won awards for "Songwriter of the Year", "Song of the Year" (for "Dead or Alive") and "Groovy Soca of the Year" (for "Don’t Stop", his collaboration with Shawn Noel) at the 8th annual Copyright Organisation of Trinidad and Tobago (COTT) awards in 2006.

In 2008 he formed his own band, Y.O.U. (Yes One Unit). Winchester collaborated with Maxi Priest on "Make It Yours" and with Serani on "All I Need".

== Discography ==
- Under My Spell (2002)
- Press Play (2004)
- Give Thanks (2005)
- Evolution (2006)
- Adrenaline (2007)
- Renaissance (2008)
- Y.O.U. (2009)

== Collaborations ==
- "Rags Don't Care" (featuring Chinese Laundry and Bunji Garlin) (2003)
- "Come Beta" (featuring Destra Garcia) (2004)
- "Don’t Waste Water" (featuring Bunji Garlin) (2005)
- "Give Thanks" (featuring Maximus Dan) (2005)
- "Tempo" (featuring Calypso Rose) (2006)
- "Move With Us" (featuring Bunji Garlin and Machel Montano) (2006)
- "Woman By My Side" (featuring Peter Ram) (2007)
- "Adrenaline" (featuring Elephant Man) (2007)
- "Poody" (featuring JMC 3Veni) (2007)
- "Give It To Me" (featuring Natalie Wilson (2007)
- "Hard Work" (featuring Mr Slaughter) (2008)
- "Whole Day" (featuring Johnny King) (2008)
- "Loving Again" (featuring Nadia Batson) (2008)
- "Allequa" (featuring Collie Buddz) (2008)
- "Traffic" (featuring Berbice) (2008)
- "Elevator" (featuring Shazelle) (2008)
- "Make It Yours" (featuring Maxi Priest) (2009)
- "All I Need" (featuring Serani)(2009)
- "Rough Wine" (featuring Bad Gyal Ce'Cile) (2009)
- "Road Calling" (featuring Skinny Fabulous) (2011)
