= Kes (band) =

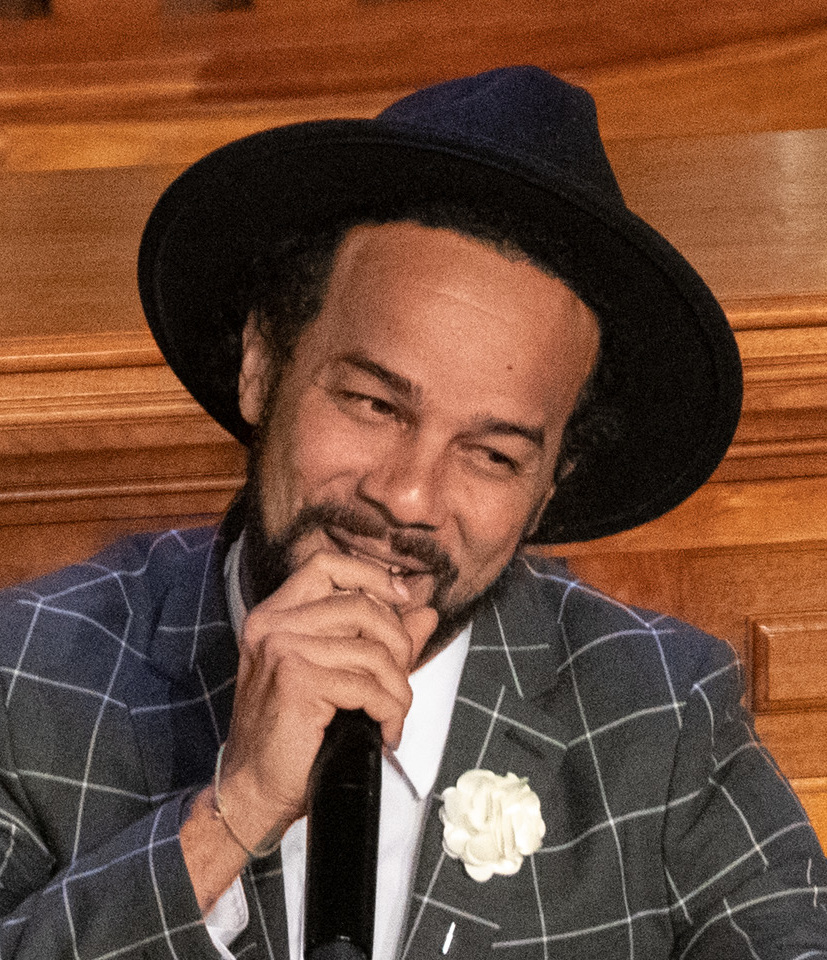
- Kees Dieffenthaller (2021)

Background information
- Origin: Trinidad and Tobago
- Genre: Soca
- Years active: 2005–present
- Website: Kestheband.com

Kes (commonly known as Kes the Band or KTB) is a Trinidadian soca group formed in 2005, known for their eclectic mix of R&B, Pop, Rock, Soca, EDM and reggae. The band originally comprised brothers Kees Dieffenthaller on lead vocals, drummer Hans Dieffenthaller, rhythm guitarist Jon Dieffenthaller along with friend Riad Boochoon on bass guitar. Hans was eventually replaced by Dean James with keyboardist Mario Callender and DJ Robbie Persaud appearing as supporting members. Since the band's inception, they've been elevated to mainstream popularity nationally and throughout the Caribbean diaspora.

In 2011, Kees was crowned T&T's International Groovy Soca Monarch The band's hit tune "Wotless" was also nominated for a 2011 BET Soul Train Music Award in the category of best Caribbean Performance. Another hit single called "Hello", released in 2017, has since earned the most digital streams of any soca song in the last decade. Kes teamed up with Iwer George to win both the 2020 T&T International Soca Monarch and Road March titles. The band has also collaborated with artistes such as Joss Stone, Shaggy, Busy Signal, Shenseea, Snoop Dogg, Major Lazer and Tesanne Chin.

Kes the Band has released ten albums to date, Three Baldheads and a Dread, Lion, On in 5, Wotless, Stereotype, Wired, MadMen Productions Presents: Kes, Windows to the World, We Home, and Man With No Door.

== Origins ==
Born to Deanna (née Prudent), a classical trained opera singer and accountant George “Bunny” Dieffenthaller, oldest son Hans began playing the drums at the age of 10. With younger brother Jon as bass player, both sought to form a garage band. When they got ahold of enough musicians, they eventually choose Kees as the band's lead singer. Performances were usually held on a stage that was built in the backyard of the Dieffenthaller home. Though the band waned off, the siblings' musical talents continued to blossom. As time went by Kees became a member of numerous choirs, theatre productions and other musical projects. At the age of 13, Kees formed an R&B group called KLAS, comprising former T&T Miss Universe Faye Alibocus, schoolmates Michael Zephyrine and Marc Alexander.

Hans, Jon and Kees eventually attended Presentation College, San Fernando. At the college they met Riad Boochoon, a classically trained pianist who shared a mutual interest in music. Riad then and there began a longstanding relationship with the Dieffenthaller brothers. The foursome later formed the core of pop/rock outfits Limestone and Rydimorai.

== History ==
=== 2006–2007 ===
In 2006, Kes launched their debut album titled Three Baldheads and a Dread (a reference to the hairstyles of the band members). This album featured tracks such as "Stay with Me" and "Heads High". The track, "The Calling" was featured on the soundtrack of EA Sports' FIFA 06.

=== 2007–2008 ===
Kes released their second album, Lion, in 2007. The title song was popular among fans due to its inspiring and motivational lyrics. "My Land" a collaboration with Nadia Batson was a hit during the carnival season that year. "My Land" placed Kes and Nadia second in the Trinidad and Tobago International Soca Monarch Competition. Kes released other tracks such as "Our Prayer", and reggae-influenced songs "Limin" and "Bigger Brighter Day" from this album which received heavy rotation on local radio stations. Later in 2007, Kes released tracks that were more diverse, such as "Come a Little Closer" which also dominated local radio stations. In 2008, Kes' carnival releases included "Right Dey" and "De Remedy". Kes also released their music video for the single "Lion" in May.

Bandleader Kees Dieffenthaller composed with noted songwriter Desmond Child, a song on American Idol alum Ace Young's 2008 studio album.

=== 2009–2010 ===
The band's third album, On In 5, was released on 10 February 2009. On In 5 featured a mix of new and old releases as well as live performances. In 2010, the band's song "Let Me Know" was selected by Six Flags to play throughout all their amusement parks. "Let Me Know" was also chosen by American Airlines to play during their in flight programmes. In this said year, Kes performed a set of three songs on the BBC World Service and launched their first ever ITunes app. What's more they earned an Independent Music Award nomination in the category of World Beat Song for "Stalker", a track from On In 5.

=== 2011–2014 ===
Kes released Wotless in 2011, their fourth studio album. The album's title song was penned by Kes and Canadian based singer/songwriter/producer Kerwin Dubois. Kees won that year's International Groovy Soca Monarch competition with "Wotless". Kes was named USA 4 Real's international artiste of February 2011. In September they featured on Fox5's Good Day New,York as the first Caribbean band to perform on this show. October saw the band nominated for a BET Soul Train Music Award in the category of Best Caribbean Performance.

August 2011 saw the band release their fifth album, Stereotype. This album featured "Loving You", a collaboration with Jamaican singer and winner of The Voice, Tessanne Chin. Another Song called Take Me Away's music video was selected as a finalist in the International Songwriting Competition. Kes released their sixth album entitled Wired in February 2012, which included popular tracks such as "Precision Wine" "Stress Away" and "Coming Over". In 2012, Kes collaborated with Snoop Dogg on a remix of "Stress Away". The song's music video was selected to appear in the 2013 BBC Music Video Festival.

During this said year, the band released the well-received track "Tuesday On The Rocks". The song's eventual popularity inspired an annual concert, launched that same year and held on the Tuesday before T&T's Carnival. Also dubbed "Tuesday On The Rocks", this show featured renowned international, regional and local artists along with young, up-and-coming acts.

2014 ushered in another hit for the band, by way of the Ricky Blaze-produced track "Endless Summer" on the "Uptown Julie Riddim". Deidre Dyer of The Fader described "Endless Summer" as an easy-on-the-ear, yet heavy-on-the-rum Soca music tune. The band collaborated with noted photographer and film director, Johnathan Mannion for the music video, which also features cameo appearances by Anya Ayoung Chee, winner of Project Runway, season nine and Major Lazer member, Jillionaire. In that year Kes, collaborated with Jamaican Reggae singer Gyptian, on a track entitled "Wet Fete" which was featured on Gyptian's album, Sex Love & Reggae. Kees appeared alongside Gyptian for the music video of "Wet Fete" which was filmed in Tobago.

=== 2017 ===
Carnival, proved to be another successful year for Kes, as their music was well-received locally and throughout the Caribbean. Tracks such as "Wine up", "Incredible", "How We Like it" and "Ramp Up" were in heavy rotation on local radio stations. 2017 also saw two major collaborations between Kes and Kernal Roberts on the track entitled "Shake", and "Workout" which featured Nailah Blackman. "Workout", a mixture of Soca music and Afrobeat quickly became one of the more popular songs coming out of Trinidad and Tobago Carnival 2017, generating over 3,000,000 views on YouTube. During his performance at "Tribe Ice" (Fete), Kees invited Jamaican Olympic Games gold medalist Usain Bolt on stage side during his segment with Kernal Roberts. This caused a buzz in the international community as video footage of this event was featured on popular gossip blogs.

The Florida Caribbean Students Association (FCSA) featured Kees as their keynote speaker at the 43rd annual Leadership Conference, which was held at the University of Florida in March 2017. Kees also served as a guest judge at that year's FCSA annual Banquet and Miss FCSA Pageant.

Another artist pairing occurred at the Decibel Entertainment Exposition in Trinidad in May 2017. Will Smith, who was a featured speaker at the event, made a surprise appearance during Kes' performance. Will performed a medley of his hit songs while accompanied by Kes.

== Performance ==
Kes live shows incorporate additional musicians Mario Callender (keyboards), Robbie "Styles" Persaud (DJ and samples), Ricardo Rameshwar (keyboards and musical director) and Aaron Vereen (percussion). During the carnival festival, Kes also makes multiple appearances and performances on various music trucks as masqueraders and spectators parade thought the streets. Kes has performed all over the Caribbean, United States, Canada, Europe and parts of Asia including Japan and China. The band has opened for acts such as Sugar Ray (2005), Musiq Soulchild (2008), Sean Paul, Rihanna, (2006), John Legend (2006), Maroon 5 (2010), Evanescence (2011) and Ne-Yo (2013). In 2016, Kes shared the stage with British music sensation, Joss Stone, where they sang a duet, of their Carnival 2016 hit song, "For the Love of the Music".

== Discography ==
- Three Baldheads and A Dread (2006)
- Lion (2007)
- On In 5 (2009)
- Wotless Carnival Album (2011)
- Stereotype (2011)
- Wired (2012)
- MadMen Productions Presents (2014)
- We Home (2020)
- Man With No Door (2024)

=== Charted singles ===
List of charted singles, showing year released, chart positions and album name
Title	Year	Peak chart position	Album
Title	Year	JAM Air.	Album
"Hello (Jott Remix)"	2018	5	Non-album single
"Rum & Coca-Cola" (with Tano)	2025	4	Non-album single

== Collaborations ==
- "Jepp Sting Naina" - Kes ft. Hunter (Lalchan Babwa) and Ravi Bissambhar
- "Loving You" - Kes the Band ft. Tessanne Chin
- "Wet Fete" - Kes ft. Gyptian
- "Ah Ting" - Kes and Kerwin DuBois
- "Heaven" - Kes ft. Nadia Batson
- "Stress Away" - Kes ft. Snoop Dogg
- "Head Bad On De Road" - Kes ft. Michelle X
- "Island Love" - Kes ft. Jenna De Leon
- "Body Talk" - Kes ft. Chris Hierro
- "Workout" - Kes ft. Nailah Blackman
- "Shake" - Kes ft. Kernal Roberts
- "Go Dung" - Major Lazer ft. Kes
- "Close To Me" - Kes and Shenseea
- "Mrs. Parker" - Rooftop ReP and Kes
- "Stage Gone Bad" - Kes and Iwer George
- "Dear Promoter" - Voice and Kes
- "Baila Riddim Mega Mix" - Motto, Kes & Skinny Fabulous
- "Magic "- Kes and Jimmy October ft. Etienne Charles
- "Liki Tiki" - Kes ft. J.Perry (prod by Michael Brun)
- "Mood" - Shaggy ft. Kes
- "Out of this World" - Sean Paul & Kes (2024_Men's T20 World Cup official theme song)
- "Gimme Everyting" - Len Boogsie Sharpe ft. Kes and Keshav
- "Live Yuh Life" - (Like Yuh Playing Mas)- Kes feat. David Rudder
