= Obolo =

Obolo may refer to:

- The obolus, a Greek silver coin worth a sixth of a drachma
- Obolo language, a language of Nigeria
- Eastern Obolo, a local government area in Nigeria
- Peter's Pence
- Obolo, Akwa Ibom, a town in Nigeria
- Andoni people, also called Obolo

== People with the surname ==
- Iván Obolo, Argentinian former football player
- Pascale Obolo (born 1960), Cameroonian film director and artist
