= Fay-Ann Lyons =

Fay Ann Lyons-Alvarez
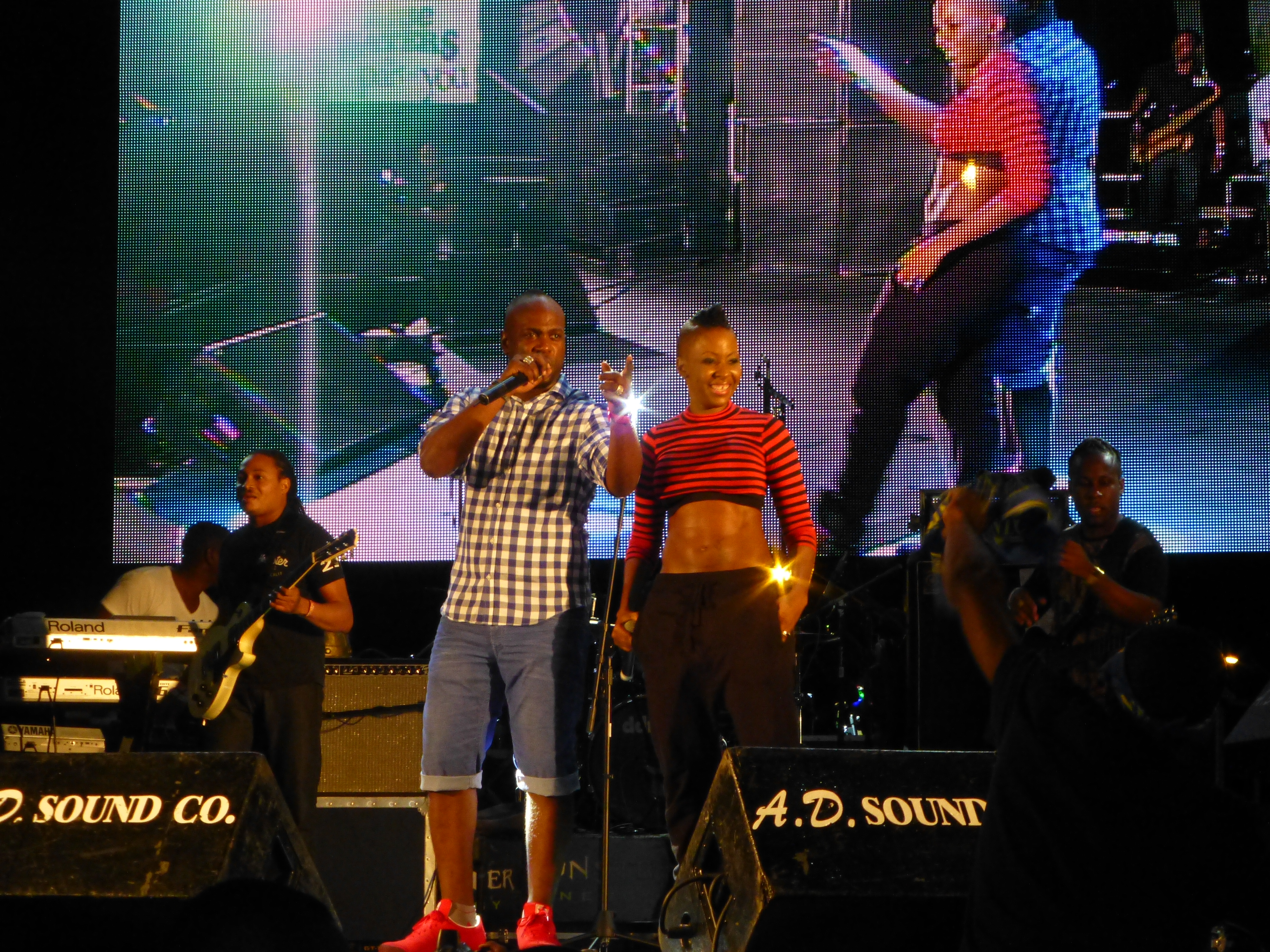
- Bunji Garlin and Fay-Ann Lyons 2014

Background information
- Also known as: Silver Surfer, Lyon Empress, Aza Sefu, Viqueen
- Born: Fay-Ann Lyons; November 5, 1980 (age 45)
- Origin: Point Fortin, Trinidad and Tobago
- Genres: Soca
- Occupations: Performer, recording artist, singer/songwriter, Chairperson of Caribbean Prestige Foundation
- Instrument: Vocals
- Years active: 2002–present
- Spouse: Bunji Garlin (married 2006)
- Website: http://www.asylumfamily.com/

Fay-Ann Lyons-Alvarez (born November 5, 1980) is a Trinidadian soca recording artist and songwriter. She is also known by the stage names Lyon Empress, Mane the Matriarch, and the Silver Surfer, a nickname which she claimed during her performance at the 2008 International Soca Monarch. Personally she's married to Bunji Garlin.

== Early life and career ==
Fay-Ann was born in Point Fortin, Trinidad to parents Austin Lyons (sobriquet Superblue/SuperBlue, formerly known as Blueboy) and Lynette Steele (sobriquet Lady Gypsy), who is also a sister to Winston "Gypsy" Peters, hence the gypsy part of her stage name.

Fay-Ann Lyons is a three-time Trinidad and Tobago Carnival Road March champion (2003, 2008, 2009) and the 2009 International Soca Monarch and International Groovy Soca Monarch champion. She created history (again) when she won the International Soca Monarch for the first time in 2009, as the first female to win the Power category, and the first individual (male or female) to win the Power, Groovy and People's Choice awards on Fantastic Friday (aka Carnival Friday) during the finals of the competition which is held annually in Trinidad. She also went on to win the Carnival Road March that year, becoming the first soca artist to win that soca 'triplet' of titles. She is the first (and only) woman to accomplish that feat while pregnant. Fay-Ann is the youngest solo artist (male or female), still actively recording, with multiple wins of the Carnival Road March crown. (Machel Montano is the youngest male with multiple wins, now that he has four solo wins and a joint win with Patrice Roberts). Fay-Ann remains the only female artist who has won the Carnival Road March three times, and is the third to attain back-to-back wins in two consecutive years joining fellow Trinidadian Macartha Calypso Rose Lewis and Alison Hinds of Barbados. Fay-Ann and husband Bunji Garlin also became parents in 2009 to a daughter born on February 28, 2009, just a few weeks after Carnival. Fay-Ann has performed at musical events both locally and abroad. Her on-tour performance events and locations include: Washington DC (2009) & (2017) BET's 106 & Park (2014), Coachella (2015), Glastonbury Festival (2015), London's Coronet (2015), Berlin Carnival-Germany and, BET X Live (2018).

== Background ==
Now an official member of the Asylum band (previously known as "Censation"), founded by husband, Bunji Garlin. Lyons is a former member of the band Invazion led by Naya George. Fay-Ann became a front-liner for the band Invazion and performed with them at many fete/concert events including the infamous 'Brass Festival' (now defunct) which was an annual event during the pre-Carnival season in Trinidad and Tobago featuring a musical 'battle' between the hottest soca bands.

== As songwriter ==
Fay-Ann writes many of her own songs, having learnt from her father, Superblue, who has won the Carnival Road March title nine times (He is second only to Aldwyn Roberts, sobriquet Lord Kitchener), and is a seven-time winner of the Trinidad Soca Monarch competition, which is the predecessor of the current International Soca Monarch. Fay-Ann's compositions have earned several nominations and wins of Copyright Music Organisation of Trinidad and Tobago (COTT) music awards including Female Songwriter of the Year and she has also received honours (listed in Awards section) from the Soca Awards Organization (SAO) for her music. Fay-Ann was profiled along with other top local and internationally renowned artists Machel Montano, Bunji Garlin (and Isaac Blackman in the documentary Soca Power in Trinidad and Tobago, the Trinidad edition of the six part film series titled Musique Creole. The documentary is available on DVD.

== Discography ==
=== Albums ===
- 2015: Raze (EP, VP Records)

=== Singles ===
- 2004: Ain't See Nothing/Wine Yeah (Bacchanal 45 Records, with Micky Rich)
- 2008: Helpless Child/Lonely Girl (Supersonic Sound, with Bunji Garlin)
- 2011: All Over (Slu Records, with The Baron)
- 2012: Rum Please (Remix) (Energy Music, with Fya Empress)

== Filmography ==
- 2006: International Soca & Groovy Soca Monarch '06
- 2007: Soca Gold 2007
- 2008: Soca Power In Trinidad & Tobago
- 2008: Soca Gold 2008
- Nikki on de Promenade

== Awards ==
- NEA: Afrosoca Artist (2017)
- SAO: Soca Collaboration of the Year: Call Me (with Bunji Garlin) (2010)
- SAO: Best Up-tempo Soca – Female: True Lies (2010)
- NACC: Top 20 Award: Tribute To Super Blue (2009)
- SAO: Hall Of Fame Award (2009)
- SAO: Soca Song Writer of the Year: Heavy T, Meet Super Blue, Wine Faster (2009)
- SAO: Overall Female Soca Artist of the Year (2009)
- SAO: Female Soca Performer of the Year (2009)
- SAO: Favorite Groove Soca – Female: Heavy T (2009)
- SAO: Favorite Up-tempo Soca – Female: Meet Super Blue (2009)
- COTT: Soca of the Year: Get On (2008)
- SAO: Female Soca Performer of the Year: Get On (2008)
- SAO: Overall Female Soca Artist of the Year: Get On (2008)
- SAO: Favorite Up-tempo Soca – Female: Get On (2008)
- SAO: Soca Song of the Year: Get On (2008)
- COTT: New Songwriter of the Year: Display (2004)
- COTT: Female Songwriter of the Year: Display (2004)
- COTT: Song of the Year: Display (2004)

List of abbreviations

NEA: Nigerian Entertainment Award COTT: Copyright Organisation of Trinidad and Tobago NACC: National Action Cultural Committee (Trinidad and Tobago) SAO: Soca Awards Organization www.socaawards.com

=== Carnival crowns ===
- 2003: Carnival Road March
- 2008: Carnival Road March
- 2009: Carnival Road March
- 2009: International Soca Monarch
- 2009: Groovy Soca Monarch
- 2009: International Soca Monarch: People's Choice
- 2010: International Soca Awards: Best Up-Tempo Soca - Female
