= Techier =

Place in Trinidad and Tobago

Coordinates: 10°10′14″N 61°40′21″W

Techier is a community in the Republic of Trinidad and Tobago. It is located in south-western Trinidad and is administered by the Point Fortin Borough Corporation. As of 2011, its population was 1,621.
