= Nadia Batson =

- Born: Nadia Batson; 7 December 1976 (age 49); Port of Spain, Trinidad and Tobago
- Other name: SASS Queen
- Occupations: Singer; Songwriter; Dancer; Businesswoman; Band Leader
- Years active: 2005–present
- Musical career
- Genres: R&B; pop; Soca
- Labels: Dynamic Entertainment; Fox Fuse
- Website: sassnation.com

Nadia Batson is a Trinidadian singer, songwriter, producer and model. She was a runner-up in the Power Category at the 2007 International Soca Monarch with her song "My Land" with Kees Dieffenthaller.

Raised in Barataria, Trinidad, she spent years behind the scenes as a songwriter, producer and a background vocalist, before becoming a notable singer. She also assists other artists behind the scenes, having written and co-produced the popular single "Go Ahead And Do Dat" for soca singer Michelle Sylvester.

== Early life ==
Nadia Batson was born on December 7, 1976, in Port of Spain, Trinidad and Tobago and raised in Barataria, a small commercial town on the East–West Corridor outside of Port of Spain City. Singing and writing since the age of eight, Batson started singing Quseedas, Muslim ballads, while attending the St Joseph TML School. As a teen she became part of an all-girls group called Silhouette which won the popular Party Time show with an a cappella version of En Vogue's remake of The Beatles' "Yesterday". She also attended high school at St. George's College until her graduate year in 1993. Batson began singing professionally at the age of 17.

Batson joined Andre Tanker's One World Contraband where she stayed until his death in 2003. She then became the lone female voice in Kes the Band until 2011, when she left to form an all-female soca band called SASS in July 2011. She is of Afro-Trinbagonian descent and has ancestry in the Caribbean island of Saint Lucia. Batson has stated in interviews that she is of the Christian faith.

== Competition history ==
Nadia contested the 2007 International Soca Monarch held on February 16, 2007. She competed in the Groovy category with her song "Caribbean Girl", and in the Power category with her song "My Land" alongside Kees Dieffenthaller. She placed 2nd in the Power category behind Iwer George and 3rd in the Groovy category. Nadia was also a finalist in the 2012 and 2014 competition in the Power category. She also competed as a finalist at the 2015 Chutney Soca Monarch competition held on January 31, 2015.

== Career ==
=== 2014–15 Digicel Rising Stars ===
On September 14, 2014, it was announced that Nadia Batson had joined the judges' panel for the eighth season of Digicel Rising Stars Trinidad and Tobago with fellow new judge 1st Klase and returning judge Sheldon Ramgoolam. In the fall of 2015 in September, Nadia Batson's contract was renewed for the ninth season of Digicel Rising Stars T&T, to continue her job being a part of the judges' panel alongside new judges Neval Chatelal and Nigel Rojas.

=== Kes The Band ===
In 2005, Batson joined the pop band, Kes The Band as a leading female vocalist, and has gone on world tours to the United States, Canada and the Caribbean with the band. In the Summer of 2011, Batson announced that she had left the band to form her own band.

=== SASS Nation ===
In the fall of 2011, Batson announced the launch of her all-female soca band, SASS Nation, lies alongside lead vocalists Terri Lyons (the sister of Fay-Ann Lyons-Alvarez) and Megan Walrond. SASS Nation is now one of Trinidad and Tobago's premier soca bands and Trinidad and Tobago's only established female soca band.
