= Tempo Networks =

Caribbean television channel

- Broadcast area: Pan-Caribbean
- Headquarters: Newark, NJ

Ownership
- Owner: Frederick Morton Jr.

History
- Launched: November 21, 2005
- Former names: MTV Tempo

Links
- Website: www.gottempo.com

Tempo Networks is a pan-Caribbean television channel that broadcasts Caribbean music and other cultural products. Its programming includes music videos, news, dramas, and documentaries about Caribbean life. Musical genres broadcast include Reggae, Soca, Dancehall, Ska, Calypso, Chutney, Chutney Soca, Reggaeton, and Punta rock. Its programming is mostly in English.

It was launched on November 30, 2005 under the ownership of MTV Networks and corporate parent Viacom. Since 2007, it has been owned by founder Frederick Morton, Jr., and is based in Newark, NJ.

The station broadcasts on Cablevision in the New York Metropolitan Area (Channel 1105), and reaches over 3,500,000 viewers in the Caribbean. It streams live over the internet 24 hours a day.

== History ==
Tempo was launched by MTV Networks in 2005. In conjunction with the launch of Tempo, MTV Networks hosted a concert series entitled "Caribbean Rising." It featured performances across several different musical genres.

== Programs ==
- Badness Outta Style
- Choices
- Cook-Up
- Cross Caribbean Countdown
- Downtown Island
- Inside the Rhythm
- My TEMPO Trip
- Pull up Selecta
- Rise & Shine
- TEMPO Live & Direct
- TEMPO Presents: Artists, Events, and Music Video Making-ofs
- West wood Park

ORIGINAL FILMS

- HUSH
- HUSH 2
- Hooked
- The Black Moses Pindling
- Chrissy
- Between Friends

== Events ==
Major events hosted by Tempo include the "Tempo Turns" events, concerts held throughout the Caribbean islands and United States, which draw tens of thousands of attendees from around the world. "TEMPO Turns 6" was held at Six Flags / Great Adventure in Jackson, New Jersey.

== Pro-social initiatives ==
TEMPO has carried out several socially conscious campaigns, including the Badness Outta Style school tours, One Love/Haiti, and TEMPO Water.

== Other ==
Additional projects include TEMPO Bookings, connecting Caribbean artists with event planners, and the TEMPO Web Store. It has also worked with tourist boards throughout the region, including those of Antigua, Trinidad & Tobago, Grenada, USVI, Barbados, and Turks & Caicos.

== Partners ==
- American Airlines
- Bahamas Telecommunications Company
- Cable & Wireless
- Carib
- Digicel
- Heineken
- Liat
- Lime
- RIM/Blackberry
- Sony/Ericsson
- VP Records

== See also ==
- CaribVision
- List of Caribbean television stations

== Press ==
- Atlanta Post - How he Built it: Frederick A. Morton, Founder of Caribbean Media Company TEMPO Networks
- New York Times - Selling the Caribbean from the Island of Newark
- NJ Monthly Magazine - Island in the City
- Newark Star Ledger - Newark Entrepreneur Creates TV Station Devoted to Caribbean Content
- Montclair Times - Montclair Man Preps to Launch Caribbean Television Station in the U.S.
- Trinidad and Tobago Guardian - TEMPO Networks Gears Fifth Anniversary
- Cable & Wireless Caribbean - Partnerships : MTV Tempo - Press Release
- Is MTV Losing Tempo?
