= International Soca Monarch =

Annual music competition

- Formation: 1993
- Founder: William Munroe
- Type: Music competition
- Headquarters: Port of Spain, Trinidad and Tobago
- Location: Trinidad and Tobago
- Official language: English
- Website: www.socamonarch.net

International Soca Monarch was an annual soca music competition/fete event. The finals were traditionally held on every Carnival Friday (aka Fantastic Friday) in Trinidad and Tobago. Contestants in the event vied for two separate crowns or titles, the International Soca Monarch (aka the Power Soca Monarch) for uptempo songs (135 bpm and above), and Groovy Soca Monarch for slower-paced songs (134 bpm and below). Between 2016 and 2018 a change in format meant that contestants vied for only one award but this one category changed was reversed in 2019. In 2016 an additional award was added, called the People's Choice, then subsequently removed, which involves text message voting by Digicel subscribers. Subscribers could have voted multiple times for their favorite artist during the competition and the artist who received the most votes was given an additional cash prize. The International Soca Monarch competition has become the mecca event for soca artists in Trinidad and Tobago (T&T) where the event has been hosted since its inception; and also the rest of the Caribbean region, as many artists who have competed on its stage have moved on to successful soca careers. Dubbed the "Super Bowl of soca music" it is a highly anticipated and well-attended event that has been graced with internationally acclaimed recording artists. Some of the prominent artists include SuperBlue (Austin Lyons), Machel Montano, Bunji Garlin, Fay Ann Lyons, Kes, Iwer George, Kevin Lyttle and Rupee (Barbados).

Soca musicians from around the region and the world are eligible to compete in the preliminary round of the competition and must attain the required number of points (in a preliminary judging) to advance into the semi-finals and subsequently the finals which is an action-packed event and has been televised and broadcast live (though not always) to viewers in Trinidad and Tobago and (via internet streaming to) the Caribbean and other regions of the world. The competition began in 1993 as a local competition for soca called the Soca Monarch (aka Trinidad & Tobago Soca Monarch), and the event quickly grew in popularity as it always featured the more popular artists singing their favoured songs for each Carnival season. It was redubbed The International Soca Monarch in 1996 when for the first time acts from around the world became eligible to compete for a place in the finals and a chance at the envied title of International Soca Monarch.

At the inception of the competition, all soca artists (whether their song was uptempo or slower) competed for the same prize. In its current format, a distinction is recognised between faster-paced soca songs (135 bpm and above) and their slower counterparts (134 bpm and below) which can still become crowd favorites. Between 2005 and 2015 artists with these slower-paced songs had a chance to compete separately from the usually more hyped-up (and consequently more popular) Power soca songs/artists, and vie for a different title, the International Groovy Soca Monarch. Between 2016 and 2018 the Power and Groovy Soca categories were merged back into one category however in 2019 the growing distinction between both styles of Soca has officially been reinstated. Therein is official recognition of the evolution of Soca music into two distinctive subgenres.

== Prizes ==
Prize money for the competition was raised to $1 million in 2009 for the Power Soca Monarch winner although reports by Caribbean Prestige Foundation indicated there would be a reduction in the prize money. Fay Ann Lyons, the 2009 winner reportedly received the full amount of the promised award (less 5% for administrative costs) when the prizes were distributed on March 20, 2009. Second and third-place winners received cash prizes valued according to their placing. In 2010 the first prize for the Power category was set at US$100,000 and the first prize for the Groovy Soca Monarch was increased to TT $200,000. The prize for 2018 was $300,000. Prize money for the International Soca Monarch has grown over the years and was announced as being $1 million TT dollars for the 2009 winner when the competition was launched in 2008. Fay-Ann Lyons-Alvarez, the 2009 winner reportedly received her prize money (subject to a small deduction) at the prize-giving ceremony in March, 2009. T&T Ministry of Community Development, Culture and Gender Affairs have reportedly suggested future prize money be reduced to $750,000 due to the downturn in the global economy. In 2004, the winner received $150,000, which was an increase from the previous year.

In 2006, $500,000 and a car constituted the winnings for double-winner Shurwayne Winchester. In 2008, the first prize was also $500,000. Since 2003, all finalists have been guaranteed a cash award for their appearance.

== Prize sponsorship ==
Past title sponsors of the event such as TSTT, bmobile and the T&T National Lotteries Control Board (NLCB) have in the past contributed to the cash awards for winners. In 2017 and 2018, the title sponsor was billed as Lotto Plus and Play Whe (respectively), which are both run by the NLCB. In August, 2010, T&T's culture minister announced a prize increase to $2M for the following year. In 2014, a new category of "Carib Break Out Artiste" was added. It was awarded to Mr. Killa of Grenada. The prize for the International Groovy Soca Monarch peaked at $500,000 TT Dollars.

== History ==
The first soca artist to win the Soca Monarch title is Superblue. He went on to win the competition a record of seven times. This record is as yet unbeaten, although several artists are closing in on that number. Since the competition has been split into two back-to-back contests, there have been only three performers to simultaneously capture both titles: Shurwayne Winchester was the first in 2006, Fay-Ann Lyons the second in 2009, and Machel Montano in 2012 and 2013. Fay-Ann is also the first female winner of the International Soca Monarch in the Power category and the first female to win both titles simultaneously. Having also won the People's Choice award that year, she is the first artist to make a clean sweep of all the prizes at the International Soca Monarch. When the local T&T competition first became an international event in 1996, all contestants were required to pass the preliminary stages to qualify for the finals. In 2009, this was changed with winners from other countries' soca monarch competitions being automatically "seeded" into the final round. Biggie Irie from Barbados became the first non-Trinbagonian to win the Groovy Soca Monarch title in 2007. In 2019 when the separate Groovy Soca and Power Soca categories were re-introduced, Mr. Killa from Grenada became the first non-Trinbagonian to win the prestigious ISM Power Soca Monarch title.

== International Power Soca Monarch Winners ==
Year	Performer	Song	Album / Notes
2020	Iwer George (featuring Kes)	"Stage Gone Bad”	Also won T&T Road March competition
2019	Mr. Killa	"Run Wid It"	Power Soca category re-introduced
2018	Voice	"Year For Love" (Groovy Soca)	One Soca category ISM competition
2017	Voice	"Far From Finished" (Groovy Soca)	One Soca category ISM competition
2016	Voice	"Cheers To Life" (Groovy Soca)	Power Soca & Groovy Soca merged
2015	Machel Montano	"Like Ah Boss" (Power Groovy)	Also won T&T Road March competition
2014	Machel Montano	"Ministry of Road"	Also won T&T Road March competition
2013	Machel Montano / Superblue (Tie)	"Float" / "Fantastic Friday"	3rd Tie In ISM History
2012	Machel Montano	"Pump Yuh Flag"	Also won T&T Road March competition
2011	Machel Montano	"Advantage"	Also won T&T Road March competition
2010	JW & Blaze	"Palance"	Also won T&T Road March competition
2009	Fay Ann Lyons-Alvarez	"Meet Superblue" (also won R.March)	First female winner of both categories
2008	Bunji Garlin	"Firery"	His 4th ISM Power Soca Monarch title
2007	Iwer George	"Fete After Fete" (Power Groovy)	BPM on borderline of Groovy & Power
2006	Shurwayne Winchester	"Ah Can't Wait"	First winner of both categories
2005	Bunji Garlin	"Blaze de Fire"	Two category ISM from 2005 to 2015
2004	Bunji Garlin	"Warrior Cry"	One category ISM from 1993 to 2004
2003	Iwer George	"Ah Home"	
2002	Bunji Garlin / Iwer George (Tie)	"We From de Ghetto/Gimme Ah Bligh"	2nd Tie In ISM History
2001	Mighty Shadow	"Stranger"	Also won T&T Road March competition
2000	SuperBlue	"Pump Up"	Also won T&T Road March competition
1999	Kurt Allen	"Dus Dem"	
1998	SuperBlue	"Ato Party"	
1997	SuperBlue / Ronnie McIntosh (Tie)	"Barbara" / "Ent"	1st Tie In ISM History
1996	SuperBlue	"Bounce"	Became International Soca Monarch
1995	Ronnie McIntosh	"On The Road"	T&T Soca Monarch from 1993 to 1995
1994	SuperBlue	"Flag Party"	
1993	SuperBlue	"Bacchanal Time"	Also won T&T Road March competition

== International Groovy Soca Monarch Winners ==
Year	Performer	Song	Album / Notes
2021	Farmer Nappy	"Backyard Jam"	Virtual Soca Monarch competition
2020	College Boy Jesse	"Happy Song"	Groovy Soca category competition
2019	Swappi	"Party Start"	Groovy Soca category re-introduced
2018	Voice	"Year For love"	One Soca category ISM competition
2017	Voice	"Far From Finished"	One Soca category ISM competition
2016	Voice	"Cheers To Life"	Groovy Soca & Power Soca merged
2015	Olatunji	"Ola"	Get Soca 2015
2014	Kerwin Du Bois	"Too Real"	
2013	Machel Montano	"The Fog"	
2012	Machel Montano	"Mr. Fete"	
2011	Kes The Band	"Wotless"	
2010	Shurwayne Winchester	"Murdah"	
2009	Fay Ann Lyons-Alvarez	"Heavy T Bumper"	First female winner of both categories
2008	Shurwayne Winchester	"Carnival Please Stay"	
2007	Biggie Irie	"Nah Going Home"	First Non-Trinbagonian Winner
2006	Shurwayne Winchester	"Don't Stop"	First winner of both categories
2005	Michelle Sylvester	"Sleeping In Your Bed"	

bmobile TSTT People's Choice
2006: Bunji Garlin
2007: Shurwayne Winchester
2008: Bunji Garlin
2009: Fay Ann Lyons-Alvarez
2010: JW & Blaze
2011: Neil 'Iwer' George
2012: Machel Montano
2013: Superblue

A new feature was added to the 2010 International Soca Monarch - text voting. Fans could text the relevant code to 7622 in the Caribbean and 78247 in US & Canada to vote for their favorite Artiste - text voting accounted for 35% of the artiste's final score. Text messaging platforms: TSTT - Trinidad and Tobago, Lime - Caribbean, All major carriers - USA & Canada.

== Sources ==
- Gov't cuts $$ for Soca Monarch
- Newsday: Soca Monarch — a springboard to success
- Caribbean Beat
- Trinidad Guardian
- Newsday: 2006 — A cultural journey
- NALIS: Carnival results
- Soca Monarch winner still to receive $
- Double victory for Shurwayne
- Daily Express: Fantastic Friday
- SocaMonarch.net
- Newsday: Prize cut for Soca queen
- Fay-Ann's prizemoney slashed by $.25m
- Fay-Ann to receive full $1 million first prize

== General References ==
- Fay Ann: Soca Monarch no longer just an event
- Power and Groovy categories return to Soca Monarch
- Soca Monarch competition now in hands of Fay Ann Lyons-Alvarez
