= Lord Christo =

Trinidadian Calypsonian

Christopher Laidlow
- Photo of Lord Christo from the 1950s
- Born: 1916; Port of Spain, Trinidad and Tobago
- Died: 1984 (aged 67–68); Trinidad and Tobago
- Occupation: Calypso musician (Calypsonian)
- Years active: 1952–aft. 1971

Christopher Laidlow known as Lord Christo/Cristo (1916–1984) was a Trinidadian Calypsonian who produced early calypso songs mainly in the 1950s and 1960s.

== Biography ==
Christopher Laidlow was born in Port of Spain in 1916 and worked as a church singer and carpenter before becoming a singer in John “Buddy” Williams’ band, his Calypso career began when he appeared at Attila the Hun’s victory tent in 1952 before going to work with the McLean Brothers. He then became a stand-alone musician creating his own songs in the 1950s and early 1960s, he also collaborated with other calypsonians, mainly Lord Melody. Lord Christo’s song “Chicken Chest” was made Carnival Road March competition in 1957. Not much is known about the life of Lord Christo outside of his musical career, his calypsos never gained the same amount of traction as Mighty Sparrow's or Lord Kitchener's calypsos.

== Albums ==
- Authentic Calypso with Lord Christo (1958)
- Cristo in Calypso (1959)
- Cristo's Calypso Flambeau (1959)
- Lord Cristo in Jamaica (1963)

== Discography ==
- Indian Fiancée and Trip to Mars (1953)
- Englishman (Humorous Englishman)
- Last Night the landlord nearly killed me (1956)
- Chicken Chest (Frozen Chicken) (1957)
- Shakespeare's quotations
- Dumb Boy and the Parrot (1962/1963)
- The Obeah Man (1963)
- Chinaman and Yankee man (1971)
