= Paul Peress =

American drummer, composer, & record producer

- Born: New York, New York, U.S.
- Genres: Jazz, Latin jazz
- Occupations: Musician, composer, record producer, fiction writer
- Instrument: Drums
- Years active: 1988–present
- Website: paulperess.com

Paul Peress is an American drummer, composer, and record producer.

== Career ==
Peress grew up in Corpus Christi, Texas. He started on violin when he was six years old, then played trumpet when he was twelve. His family moved after his father, Maurice Peress, became music director for the Kansas City Philharmonic. He attended Hunter College, then Columbia University, achieving a BA in Economics. After college, He went on to study drums privately with Kenwood Dennard and Kim Plainfield. In 1987, he formed a jazz rock band with his sister, singer Anika Paris; they released an album in 1990. Peress took a departure from music from 1992 to 1998: Peress was Director of Commercial Leasing for the firm Walter & Samuels in New York City. He returned to Music full-time in 1998, as composer, drummer, and bandleader of The Paul Peress Project, and began touring almost immediately.

=== Appearances ===
The Paul Peress Project–with Peress as Music Director/Drummer–has been the backing band for Chaka Khan, Moby, Regina Belle, Brenda Russell, Deniece Williams, Tom Scott, Phil Perry, and sideman with Mary Wilson (The Supremes). The Paul Peress Project has appeared internationally: at the Standard Bank Joy of Jazz festival in Johannesburg SA, St. Kitts Music Festival, Saint Lucia Jazz Festival, Jamaica Jazz and Blues Festival, Berkeley Jazz Festival, Heineken Jazz Festival, Kaslo Jazz Etc. Festival, Puerto Rico's Festival Internacional de Jazz Latino, and Lincoln Center Out-of-Doors Festival. Peress has lent his services to Foundation Fighting Blindness, Farm Sanctuary, In Defense of Animals, and Humane USA, performing with Moby, The B-52's, Stephen Bishop, and Eileen Ivers.

=== Songwriting ===
Peress has co-written songs with Grammy winners Brenda Russell, Bill Champlin, & Deniece Williams.

=== Productions ===
New-York Historical Society: Peress produced four concerts in 2005 and 2006 paralleling NYHS's groundbreaking exhibit, "Slavery in New York". The 2005 concerts were coined, "The Influence of Enslaved Peoples on Music in and About the Americas", and featured Arturo O'Farrill, Candido Camero, David Amram, and Guy Davis. In 2006, the series continued with two more concerts, one with Jimmy Heath and the other with Candido Camero. All four concerts were designed to show the evolution of the respective genres (Afro-Cuban, blues, jazz, Latin jazz) and demonstrated the music's development from its earliest forms to the present.

Lincoln Center: Guy Davis, Michael Hill, and Paul Ossola were featured in a "Routes of the Blues" concert at Lincoln Center Out of Doors Festival, demonstrating the history of the blues.

Merkin Concert Hall: Peress was commissioned by Donald Maggin in 2007 to co-produce a concert titled "Jazz, The Religious Roots". It featured Carla Cook and Arturo O'Farrill with guests, Michael Mossman, and Chembo Corniel.

Concert for Haiti: Peress performed at the Hard Rock Hotel Punta Cana on April 30, 2011, in a concert benefiting Wyclef Jean's Yéle Haiti Foundation to raise funds for Haitian earthquake victims. Guests included Gerald Veasley, the Manhattans lead singer, Lee Williams, and Grammy winner Deniece Williams.

== Personal life ==
His sister, singer and pianist Anika Paris, wrote Making Your Mark in Music about performing. His aunt, Jane Velez-Mitchell, wrote about addiction in iWant.

== Discography ==
- 2002 Awakening
- 2006 Then Again
- 2010 Can't Let Go
- 2021 Falling Awake
