= Crazy (singer) =

Trinidadian calypsonian (born 1944)

- Also known as: Wong Ping, The Mighty Arawak
- Born: Edwin Ayoung; 1944 (age 81–82); Port of Spain, Trinidad
- Genres: Calypso, soca, parang soca, chutney soca, reggae
- Years active: 1974–present
- Labels: Crazy, Charlie's, Kalico, Ice, JWP, Hometown Music
- Website: www.calypsocrazy.com

Edwin Ayoung (born 1944), better known as Crazy, is a Trinidadian calypsonian. He has been active since the mid-1970s and is one of the most successful artists from Trinidad and Tobago.

== Career ==
Ayoung was born in 1944 at Maraval Road, Port of Spain, Trinidad, one of eleven children to a Chinese Trinidadian father and an Afro-Venezuelan mother. As a youth he showed promise as a cricketer, but chose a career in music. He initially worked under the names Wong Ping and the Mighty Arawak, but was renamed 'Crazy' by fellow calypsonian Fred Farrell due to his extravagant performances.

Crazy made his solo carnival debut in 1975 with "The Electrician", which was also released as a single. He followed this with "Satan's Coming" and "A Great Achievement", before signing for Eddy Grant's Ice Records label, for which he had his first hit, "Dustbin Cover"/"Listen Joffre Serrette". The two songs from the single gained him second place at the National Calypso Monarch finals in 1978.

Crazy was the first artist to sing a "Parang Soca" song (mixing soca and hymnal Latin music) in 1978. His debut album, Crazy's Super Album, was released in 1979 and sold over 35,000 copies in his home country.

Crazy acted in the Trinidad All Theatre Productions' shows Cinderama (1980) and Snokone and the Seven Dwens (1981), and in 1982 toured Europe with the company in their re-enactment of carnival's traditional J'Ouvert opening ceremony.

In 1982, he finished joint second at Road March with "Uncle Crazy". In 1984 he became one of the first soca artists to perform at Reggae Sunsplash. He won Road March in 1985 with "Suck Meh Soucouyant", and finished as runner-up in 1989.

He pioneered the crossover genre chutney soca with his 1989 Road March entry, "Nani Wine", a big hit in North America and the West Indies in 1989.

After a relative lack of success in the early 1990s, which included an album recorded with Byron Lee, his fortunes improved in 1997 with the release of the album Still Crazy After 25 Years, the same year finishing third in the Soca Chutney Monarch competition and reaching the final of International Soca Monarch.

He continues to feature in major contests, and in 2007 placed 5th at Road March with "Cold Sweat".

In 2012 he pioneered another new style, "Trini-style reggae", releasing a Trini-reggae cover of "Hotel California".

In 2013 Crazy was named in a list of the top 50 calypsonians of the 20th century by the Trinbago Unified Calypsonians' Organisation (TUCO).

In 2015 he headlined the Pan New England Steelband Festival in Blue Hill, Maine.

== Lyrical content ==
Crazy's lyrics are often humorous, but have also incorporated political themes. While many of his lyrics have been risqué, in 2011, he appealed to parang soca artists to keep lyrics 'holy' in the runup to Christmas. In contrast to the homophobic lyrics of many calypsonians, Crazy's "Take ah Man", with its line "If yuh cyar get ah wooman, take ah man", was adopted as a gay anthem in Trinidad and Tobago. He wrote "Stop the Crime" in response to the murder of state prosecutor Dana Seetahal and general level of crime in Trinidad.

== Discography ==
=== Albums ===
- Crazy's Super Album (1979), Crazy
- Madness Is Gladness (1980), Crazy
- My Method of Madness (1980), Crazy
- Mad Man Jam (1982), CCM
- New Direction (1983), Kalico
- Fire (1985), Crazy
- Here I Am (1986), Crazy
- Chief Crazy (1987), Crazy
- Crazy Crazy (1981), Kai Soca
- Nani Wine (1989), Trinity
- Soca Beti (1990), Benab
- Jump Leh We Jump (1991), Dynamic
- Crazymania (1992), JWP
- Let's Go Crazy (1993), JWP
- Craziah Than Ever (1994), JWP
- Crazy For You (1995), JWP
- Wildness (1996), JWP
- Still Crazy After 25 Years (1997), JWP
- Ah Crazy Again (Back to Basics) (1999), JWP
- Dangerously Crazy (2001), JWP
- Masquerade (2002), JWP
- Best of Crazy (2002), JWP
- Crazy On De Loose (2003), JWP
- Trnidad Crazy (2004), Hometown Music
- Sweet Madness (2005), Hometown Music
- De Maddest (2006)
- Cold Sweat (2007)
- Unstoppable (2008)
- Crazylicious (2009)
- Evergreen (2010)
- The Recipe (2012)

=== EPs ===
- Crazy 2011 (2011)
- Crazy's Crazy Singles 2012 (2012)
- Crazy 2013 (2013)

=== Singles ===
- "Chinaman" (1974), Strakers
- "Religious Procession"/"The Electrician" (1975), Crazy
- "Satan's Coming" (1976), MAM/Charlie's
- "Band Leaders Ain't Care" (1977), MAM/Bellini
- "A Great Achievement" (1977), MAM/Bellini
- "Dustbin Cover"/"Listen Joffre Serrette" (1978), Ice
- "Parang Soca"/"Guadeloupe Chick" (1979)
- "Crazy’s Contribution To The International Year Of The Child" (1979), Crazy
- "Muchacha" (1979)
- "Don't Try That" (1980)
- "Sweet Daisy" (1983), Kalico
- "Ain’t Boung For You" (1984)
- "Drive It" (1988)
- "Christmas Parang Parti" (1990), Charlie's
- "De Party Now Start" (1992)
- "Parang Soca" (1992), Cahrlie's
- "Dis Is How" (1994), JWP
- "D'Ride" (1998)
- "Qualified Cashier" (2003), Hometown Music

Digital singles/tracks

- "Phone Card" (2008)
- "When Steel Talks" (2009)
- "Rub It Up" (2010)
- "Patrick Manning Must Go" (2010)
- "More Percy" (2010)
- Crazy 2012 (2012)
- "I For Kamla" (2013)
- "Big Band" (2013)
- "De Bull" (2013)
