= Point Fortin =

Borough in Trinidad and Tobago

- Borough
- Republic Borough of Point Fortin
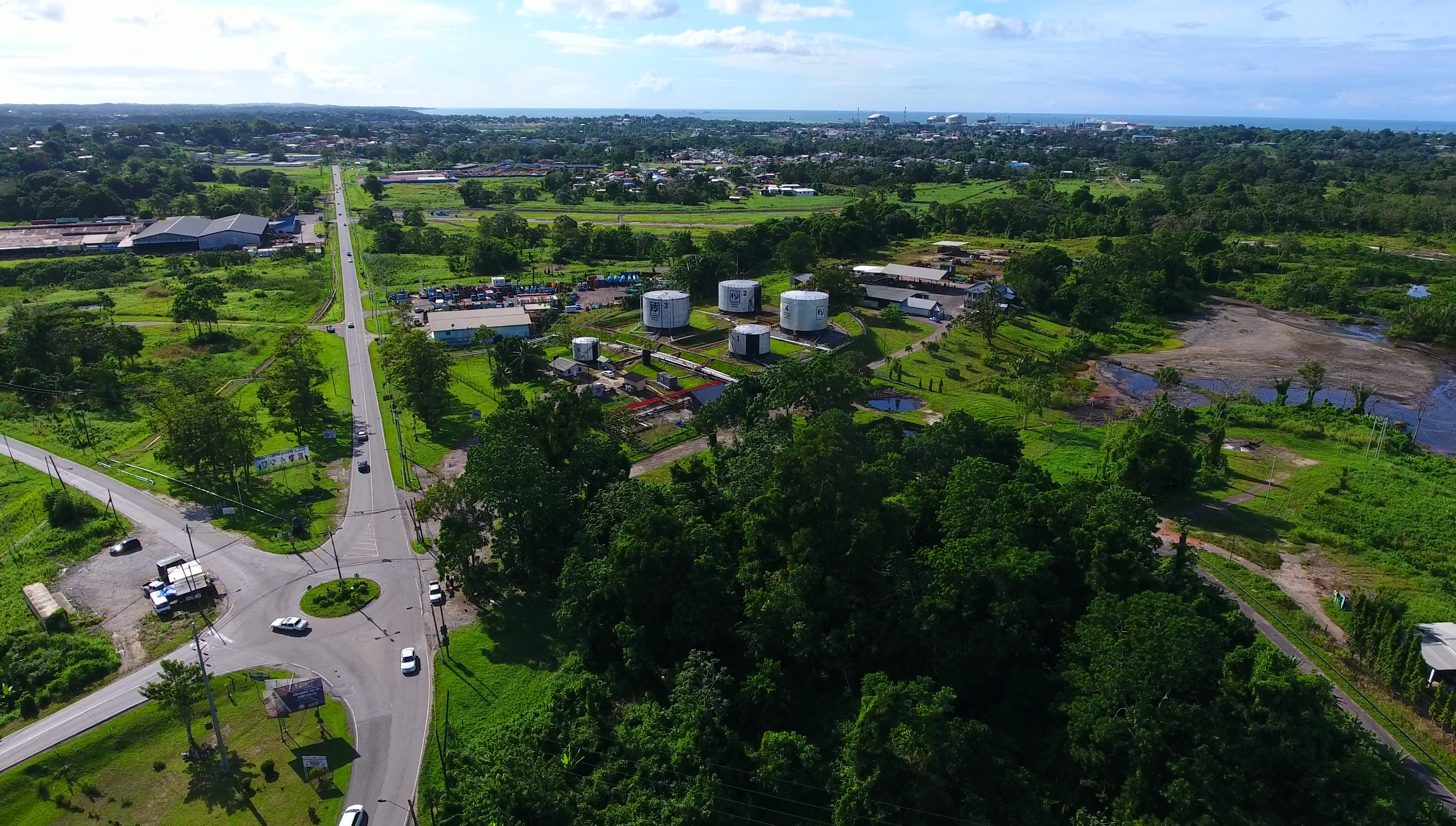
- Point Fortin (in the background)
- Motto: Aspire to Achieve
- Location within Trinidad and Tobago Location within the Caribbean Location within North America
- Coordinates: 10°10′N 61°40′W
- Country: Trinidad and Tobago
- Jurisdiction: Republic Borough of Point Fortin
- Settled: 1783
- Borough: 24 March 1980

Government
  - Governing body: Point Fortin Borough Corporation
  - Mayor: Saleema McCree Thomas, PNM
  - Deputy Mayor: Councillor Leslie Chang Fong
  - Chief Executive Officer: Donnamay Taylor, PNM
- Borough Corporation seats: 6 electoral districts
- House seats: 1/41

Area
  - Total: 23.88 km^{2} (9.22 sq mi)
- Elevation: 9 m (30 ft)

Population (2011)
  - Total: 20,235
  - Density: 843/km^{2} (2,180/sq mi)
- Time zone: UTC-4 (AST)
- Postal Code: 64xxxx, 70xxxx
- Area code: +1 (868) 648, 651, 690
- ISO 3166 code: TT-PTF
- Website: pointfortinborough.com

Point Fortin, officially the Borough of Point Fortin, is the smallest borough in Trinidad and Tobago and is located in southwestern Trinidad, about 32 km (20 mi) southwest of San Fernando. After the discovery of petroleum in the area in 1906 the town grew into a major oil-producing centre. The town grew with the oil industry between the 1940s and 1980s, culminating in its elevation to borough status in 1980. After the end of the oil boom Point Fortin was hit hard by economic recession in the 1980s and the closure of its oil refinery. Construction of a Liquefied Natural Gas plant by Atlantic LNG in late 1990s boosted the economy.

== History and development ==
At the beginning of the 20th century (before the discovery of oil), Point Fortin was an agricultural community with three distinct and separately owned cocoa and coconut estates.

These estates were sparsely populated. Employment was provided for a small number of workers who depended on the estates for their living accommodation as well as their food and other supplies. Travel in and out of Point Fortin was by coastal steamers as there was no road into or out of the area. The inhabited area was located along the seacoast.

In 1907, the Trinidad Oilfields moved into Point Fortin on an expedition for the exploration of oil and sank its first oil well on the La Fortunee Estates. That company turned out to be the only one that survived successfully, although there had been several similar expeditions by other oil companies.

The company later changed its name to the United British Oilfields of Trinidad then became Shell Trinidad Limited. In 1974 it was acquired by the Government and named TRINTOC or the Trinidad and Tobago Oil Company, today known as Petrotrin.

The change from an agricultural to an oil based economy made a significant impact in Point Fortin. There was rapid development in the construction of dwelling houses, plant, pipelines and oil tanks in the area. Point Fortin was booming and labour, particularly skilled labour for the new technology, was scarce and posed a major problem. Trinidadians did not seem to be attracted to the area.

Although people migrated from all over the country, the population in 1931 was less than 500. There were very few houses, no schools, and recreational and other facilities. As a result, Trinidadians who went to work in Point Fortin never took their families with them.

However, this changed when the company realised that in order to attract and retain workers, they needed to develop the area. This encouraged families to settle in the area, and coupled with a growth in the commercial sector, brought about such facilities as a post office, police station as well as other governmental agencies and banks.

In the 1960s the town began to see a decline due to massive retrenchment. The Government tried to revive the economic activity and eventually succeeded in establishing the Dunlop Tyre Factory. However the economic revival was only achieved in the early 1970s as a result of the Oil boom and the acquisition of Shell Trinidad Limited by the government. Point Fortin's Mayor is Clyde James (PNM). The MP for Point Fortin is Ernesto Raymond Kesar. (UNC).

== Demographics ==
=== Ancestry ===
Historical populations
| Year | Pop. | ±% |
|---|---|---|
| 1980 | 16,710 | — |
| 1990 | 18,622 | +11.4% |
| 2000 | 17,755 | −4.7% |
| 2011 | 20,161 | +13.6% |

Borough of Point Fortin racial breakdown
| Racial composition | 2011 |
|---|---|
| Black (Afro-Trinidadian/Tobagonian) | 59.5% |
| South Asian (Indo-Trinidadian) | 11.5% |
| Multiracial | 9.1% |
| Dougla (South Asian and Black) | 8.9% |
| White Trinidadian | 0.4% |
| East Asian (Chinese) | 0.12% |
| Native American (Amerindian) | 0.09% |
| Arab (Syrian/Lebanese) | - |
| Other | 0.1% |
| Not stated | 10.4% |

== Notable natives ==
Culture

- Fay-Ann Lyons Alvarez – Soca artiste
- Austin Lyons (Superblue) – Calypsonian / Soca artist/ father of Fay-Ann Lyons and her sister Terri Lyons
- Kelvin Pope (The Mighty Duke) – Calypsonian

Sports

- Atiba Charles
- Avery John
- Kenwyne Jones
- Keyeno Thomas
- Warren Archibald
- Steve David
- Anthony Douglas
- Randy Samuel - Canadian soccer player
- Marsha Mark-Baird

== Education ==
Primary schools

- Point Fortin Roman Catholic Primary School
- Point Fortin S.D.A Primary School
- Egypt Village Government Primary School
- Point Fortin Anglican Primary School
- Point Fortin A.S.J.A Primary School
- Cap-de-Ville Government Primary School
- Fanny Village Government Primary School

Secondary schools

- Point Fortin East Secondary School (formally known as PFC)
- Point Fortin West Secondary School (formally known as the Junior Secondary)
- Holy Name Convent'

== Electoral districts ==
- Egypt Village
- Techier/Guapo Village
- Mahaica/New Lands Village
- Cap-De-Ville/Fanny Village
- New Village
- Hollywood Village
