= Pascale Obolo =

Cameroonian film director and artist (b. 1967)

- Born: January 7, 1967 (age 59)
- Occupations: Film director artist

Pascale Obolo (born 7 January 1967) is a Cameroonian film director and artist.

== Biography ==
A graduate of the Conservatoire Libre du Cinéma Français in Paris University of Paris VIII she is noted for her feminist films documenting women in Hip Hop in the French suburbs and African musical culture. In 2005 she released her debut film, Calypso at Dirty Jim's, a tribute to calypso and Trinidad, which won numerous awards in 2006 including the International Pan-African Film Festival of Cannes and African Diaspora Film Festival in New York. In 2008 she produced the short film La Femme invisible (The Invisible Woman). Her first full-length film was a documentary about Calypso Rose in 2011.

Obolo co-founded the art magazine Afrikadaa, and also participates in the African Art Book Fair (AABF). She has worked with the Goethe Institute in Cameroon for several years with what she describes as an "architecture-driven film-meets-print project".
