= Mighty Shadow =

Calypsonian from Tobago (1941–2018)

The Mighty Shadow OBE HBM (Silver), DLitt

Background information
- Also known as: The Mighty Shadow
- Born: Winston McGarland Bailey; 4 October 1941; Belmont, Trinidad and Tobago
- Died: 23 October 2018 (aged 77) St. Joseph, Trinidad and Tobago
- Genres: Calypso, soca
- Occupations: Musician, singer, record producer, songwriter
- Instrument: Vocals

Winston McGarland Bailey (4 October 1941 – 23 October 2018), better known by his stage name The Mighty Shadow or Shadow, was a calypsonian from Tobago.

== Career ==
Bailey was born in Belmont, a suburb of Port of Spain in Trinidad, but grew up in Les Coteaux, Tobago, with his grandparents. He started singing calypsos at the age of 8.

At the age of 16 he moved back to Port of Spain, where for a time he was homeless while trying to established himself. In 1970, he performed as part of the chorus in Mighty Sparrow's "Young Brigade" calypso tent, and by the following year he had begun to establish himself as a calypsonian in his own right. He chose the stage name "Shadow" (he did not use "Mighty" himself) after coming across some workmen digging a road while he was walking. One of the workmen was in a hole below the road surface and the others were calling him "Shadow", and Bailey said: "I felt like they was calling me." In his early years he performed wearing all black, with a large hat covering part of his face.

The Guardian newspaper, speaking of Shadow's stagecraft, argued that he had "a persona and outlook that stood in dramatic contrast to the classic bravura of the typical calypsonian, one that might have been expected to generate either bemusement or scorn in his native Trinidad and Tobago", and yet noted that on the contrary his stage presence and music "proved so original, so eerily amusing and so engaging that [he] quickly came to be hailed as one of the greats".

He won the Road March in 1974 with "Bassman" (where he also placed second with "I Come Out to Play") by a record margin, and won again in 2001 with "Stranger", making him the competition's oldest winner. He won the Calypso Monarch contest in 2000 with "What's Wrong With Me" and "Scratch Meh Back". His music used bass more prominently than most calypsonians, of which he said: "I did 'Bassman', then I started to use melodic bass lines, not like they used before, and when I performed in the calypso tents in the early days, I had one extra sheet of music, just for the bass." Shadow's innovative use of the melodic bassline in "Bassman" was a harbinger of things to come with the emerging soca music style that would transform calypso in the mid-1970s. Shadow is also known for his unique dance in which he jumped to the tempo of his music in "skip-rope style" with both feet in the air at the same time.

He was the second calypsonian to win both the International Soca Monarch and the Trinidad Road March competitions simultaneously, a feat he accomplished in 2001 with "Stranger". He rivalled fellow calypsonians Mighty Sparrow and Lord Kitchener after winning the Road March in 1974.

Shadow is the subject of Christopher Laird's 2017 film King from Hell, featuring concert performances and an interview.

He died on 23 October 2018 at the age of 77 at Mount Hope Hospital in St. Joseph, after suffering a stroke two days earlier.

== Awards and recognition ==
- 1988 - NAFEITA Award
- 1991 - N.A.C.C. - Top 20 Stars of Gold Calypso Award - "If the Poor Get Rich"
- 1993 - 3rd Annual Caribbean Music Awards - Best Engineered Recording
- 1994 - N.A.C.C. Calypso of the Year Award - "Poverty is Hell"
- 1995 - 5th Annual Caribbean Music Awards - Best Record, Calypso/Social Commentary
- 1995 - Sunshine Awards - Best Social Commentary
- 1995 - Everybody's, The Caribbean Magazine - Calypso Awards - Most Humorous Calypso
- 1996 - Eastern Credit Union - Outstanding Contribution to the Calypso Artform
- 1996 - N.A.C.C. - Top 20 Stars of Gold Calypso Award - "For Better of Worse"
- 1997 - N.A.C.C. - Top 20 Stars of Gold Calypso Award - "Treat Your Lady Nice"
- 2000 - N.A.C.C. - Top 20 Stars of Gold Calypso of the Year Award - "Scratch Meh Back"
- 2000 - Trinidad and Tobago Association of Baltimore - Achievement Award for Lifetime Contribution
- 2000 - Mucurapo Senior Comprehensive - Recognition of Contribution to the Culture
- 2000 - Calypso Classics - Outstanding Contribution to the Artform
- 2000 - Top Fifty Calypsonians of the Twentieth Century
- 2001 - N.A.C.C. - Top 20 Stars of Gold Calypso Award - "Looking for Horn"
- 2001 - COTT - Song of the Year
- 2001 - Vibe CT 105/TUCO Kitchener - National Road March Winner
- 2001 - TUCO/Honda Calypso Monarch - 2nd Place
- 2001 - Vistrac Ltd - Outstanding Performance
- 2001 - UNAIDS - Spokesperson for the Caribbean in worldwide fight against HIV/AIDS
- 2001 - Power 102 - In Recognition of Carnival 2001 Soca Monarch and Road March
- 2002 - Sunshine Awards - Calypso of the Year "Looking for Horn"
- 2002 - Sunshine Awards - Producer of the Year - "Stranger"
- 2002 - COTT - Golden Achievement Award
- 2002 - The Port of Spain Corporation Award of Appreciation
- 2002 - N.A.C.C. - Top 20 Stars of Gold Calypso Award - "Goumangala"
- 2002 - Spektakula Promotions - Appreciation for Contribution to the Culture
- 2003 - N.A.C.C. - Top 20 Stars of Gold Calypso Award - "Find Peace"
- 2004 - Hilton Trinidad - Recognition for Contribution to the Culture
- 2004 - N.A.C.C. - Top 20 Stars of Gold Calypso Award - "Cocoyea"
- 2004 - TUCO - Chantuelle Excellence Award
- 2006 - Bmobile Award for Recognition of Contribution to Culture
- 2007 - N.A.C.C. - Top 20 Stars of Gold Calypso Award - For Excellence and Outstanding Achievement in Music
- 2007 - TUCO - Humorous Commentary 1st Place - "If Ah Coulda"
- 2008 - Crosstowm Carnival Committee - Dragon Nest Award of Merit
- 2009 - Signal Hill Alumni Choir - Music That Matters
- 2010 - TUCO Outstanding Contribution to the Calypso Artform
- 2014 - Sunshine Awards - Hall of Fame

== Honours ==
In 2003, Bailey received the Hummingbird Medal (Silver) for his contributions to music in Trinidad and Tobago.

On 27 October 2018, the University of the West Indies conferred on Bailey the Degree of Doctor of Letters (DLitt) Honoris Causa for his contributions as a musical composer, an award he had been due to receive before he died.

== Discography ==
=== Albums ===
- 1974 - De Bassman
- 1979 - If I Coulda I Woulda I Shoulda
- 1980 - Shadow
- 1984 - Sweet Sweet Dreams
- 1984 - Return of De Bassman
- 1987 - Raw Energy
- 1988 - Dingolay
- 1988 - High Tension
- 1990 - The Monster
- 1991 - Columbus Lied
- 1992 - Winston Bailey is the Shadow
- 1999 - Am I Sweet or What?
- 2000 - Once Upon a Time
- 2003 - No Middle Ground
- 2003 - Fully Loaded

== Other sources ==
- "In the Shadow of Great Music: The Bassman". Trinidad Guardian. 1 January 2000. p. 10. Archived from the original on 30 November 2007.
- Small, Essiba (18 February 2000). "Shadow's Untold Story". Trinidad Guardian. p. 3. Archived from the original on 30 November 2007.
