= Brucelee Almightee =

- Origin: Barbados
- Genres: Soca
- Occupations: Musician, Songwriter
- Years active: 2020–present

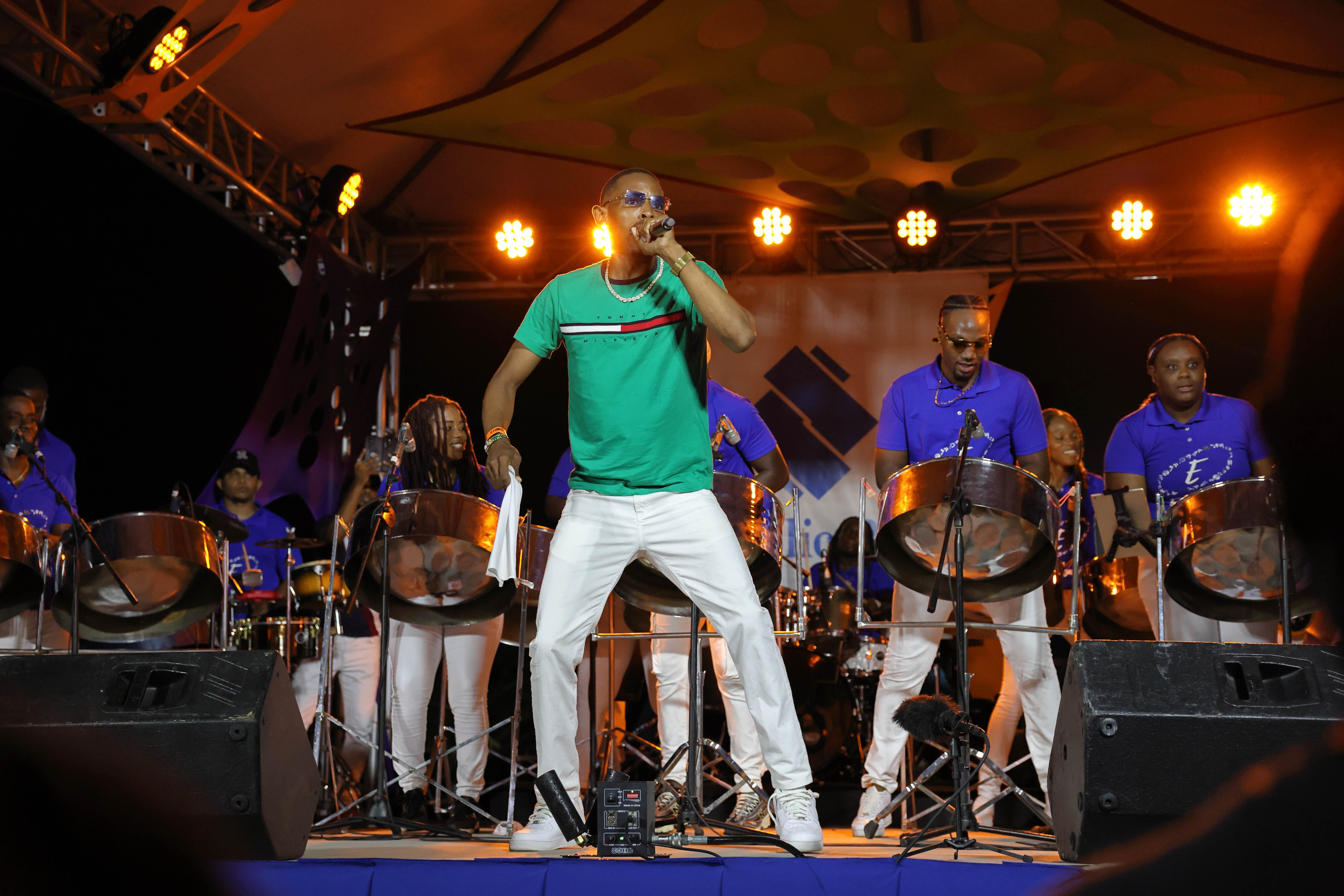
Brucelee Almightee performing at Crop Over in Barbados

Brucelee Almightee is a Barbadian soca musician and songwriter, best known for his hit song "Tomorrow," which won the prestigious Tune of the Crop award at the 2024 Flow Grand Kadooment in Barbados. The song became the most popular track of the event, being played 16 times as bands paraded before the judges, solidifying its place as a favorite during the festival.

In addition to this achievement, "Tomorrow" also led Brucelee Almightee to victory in the 2024 People's Monarch competition, where he competed against other top soca artists. His success in these competitions has marked him as a rising star in the Caribbean music scene.

Known initially for his fun and energetic songs, Brucelee Almightee has expressed a desire to be embraced by the public as a more serious soca artist. This shift in his musical direction has been well-received, contributing to his growing reputation within the soca community.
