= Tallpree =

- Birth name: Wilt Cambridge
- Born: 29 July 1973 (age 52); Vendome, St. George's, Grenada
- Genres: Soca, Dancehall
- Occupation(s): Musician, Singer, Songwriter
- Instrument: Vocals
- Years active: 1989–present
- Labels: FOX FUSE
- Website: tallpree.me

Wilt "Tallpree" Cambridge (born 29 July 1973) is a Grenadian soca artist.

He initially began performing as a reggae dancehall artist in the late 1980s and made the switch to becoming a soca artist the late 90s. His first stage name was Mr. Evilus, but by the time he began singing the popular "Jab Jab" – infused music soca enthusiasts have come to expect from him, he changed his name to Tallpree.

In 2000, Tallpree built a massive audience in the Spicemas Grenada Carnival season with the soca song "Grave, Jail, Hospital," which was named the Road March (most popular/played song) that year.

Tallpree continues to perform popular soca tunes all around the world, and in 2011, he was named Grenadian Cultural Ambassador.

== EPs ==
- Jab Love (FOX FUSE, 2017)
