= Skinny Fabulous =

Vincentian musician

- Birth name: Gamal Doyle
- Origin: Saint Vincent and the Grenadines
- Genres: Soca
- Occupation(s): Singer, songwriter
- Years active: 2005–present
- Website: instagram.com/skinnyfabulous instagram.com/oxygen_mas

Gamal Doyle, better known as Skinny Fabulous, is a Vincentian musician, singer and songwriter. He is a five-time Soca Monarch winner in Saint Vincent and the Grenadines and became the first non-Trinidad and Tobago citizen to win the Carnival Road March title in that country alongside Trinidadian soca artists Ian "Bunji Garlin" Alvarez and Machel Montano with the song "Famalay" in 2019.

== Career ==
His success continued in 2009 when he was awarded St. Vincent and the Grenadines Entertainer of the Year, and was the first runner up in the OECS Soca Monarch competition he also was adjudged Best New Male Artist at the Soca Music Awards.

== Discography ==
- "Beyond A Doubt"

=== Singles ===
- "Blinking Bad" (2021)
- "Inches" (2021)
- "Malibu and Pine" (2005)
- "The Cave" (2011)
- "Duracell" (2010)
- "Monster" (2012)
- "This Island is mine" (2015)
- "Born for This" (2015)
- "Head Bad" (2009)
- " Rave Out" (2012)
- "Angela" (2012)
- "Hurricane" (2013)
- "Watch Thing" (2016)
- "It's the Weekend" (2015)
- "Solid as a Rock" (2016)
- "Going Off" (2014)
- "Make it Rain" (2016)
- "More Jab" (2015)
- "Mash Up International" (2015)
- " What time is it" (2012)
- "Full Hundred" (2015)
- "Sober is over rated" (2015)
- "All Day, All Night" (2015)
- "Mad People" (2011)
- "Feeling so Blessed" (2016)
- "Party Again" (2016)
- "Vincy People" (2019)
- "Reckless" (2019)
- "Family" (2019)
- "Good People" (2017)
- "Solid as a Rock" (2016)
- "Amsterdam" (2015)
- "Don't give it away" (2016)
- "Brutal" (2017)
- "Lights Go Down" (2017)
- "Tallawah" (2016)
- "Letter to the Commissioner" (2019)
- "Party Start" (2018)
- "Worst Behaviour" (2014)
- "Happy" (2018)
- "Bipolar" (2019)
- "Up and Up" (2019)
- "Ignorant" (2015)

=== Collaborations ===
- "People Business" feat. Teddyson John - (2021)
- "Skinny Fabulous, Machel Montano & Bunji Garlin - FAMALAY" (2019)
- "Pick Your Position" Feat. Motto (2019)
- "Give It To Ya (Official Remix)", Marzville featuring Skinny Fabulous (2018)
- "Skinny Fabulous - "Good People" Feat. Azariah Gibson, Darron Andrews (2017)
- "Skinny Fabulous & Machel Montano - MONSTROSITY" (2013) * * "Nah Ready Yet" with Alison Hinds
