= Superblue =

Trinidad and Tobago musician (born 1956)

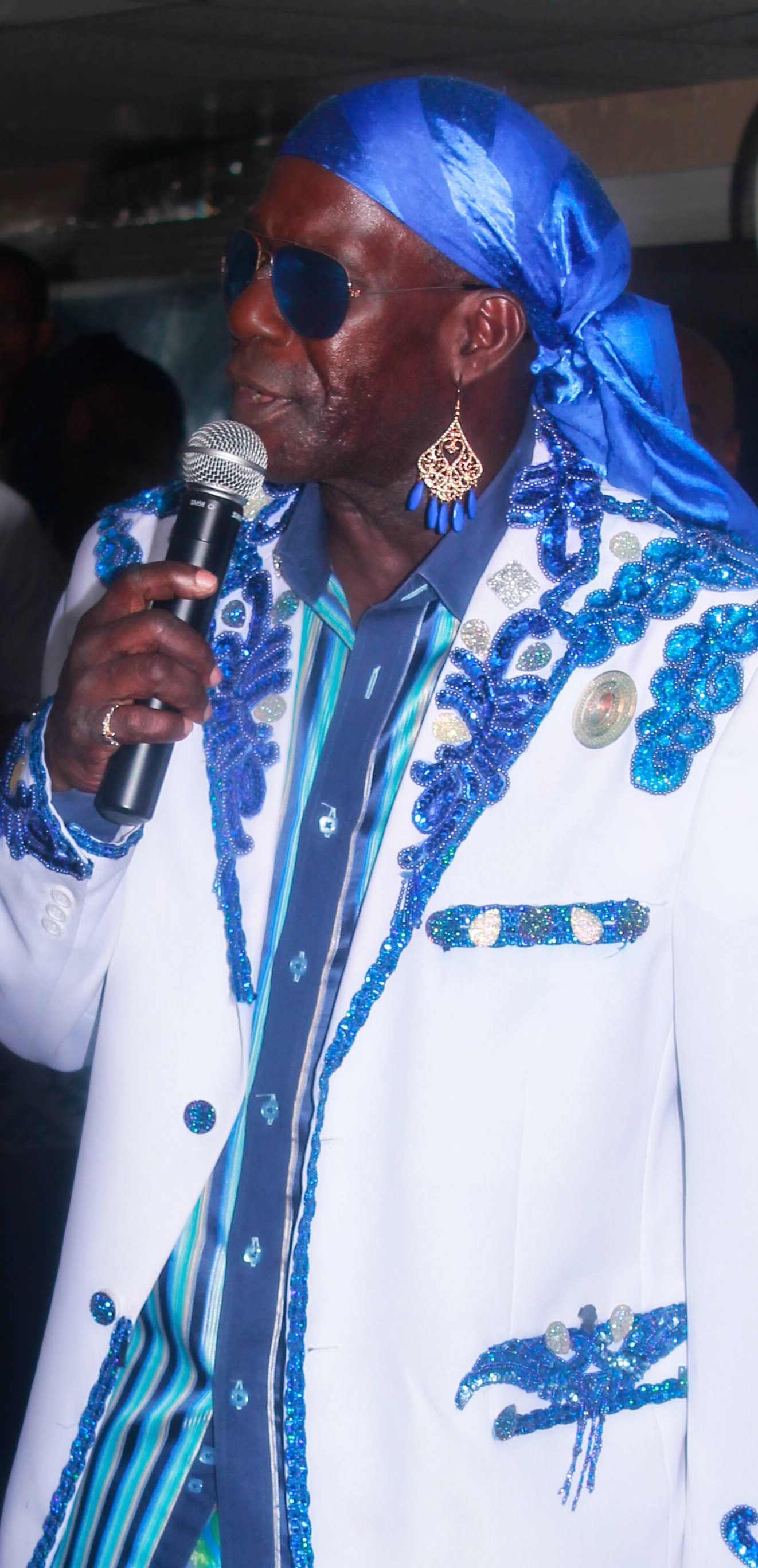
- Born: Austin Lyons; 25 May 1956 (age 70); Point Fortin, Trinidad and Tobago
- Other name: Blue Boy
- Years active: 1980–present

Austin Lyons (born 25 May 1956), better known as Superblue, Super Blue and Blueboy, is a Trinidadian calypsonian, soca artist, and songwriter.

== Early life ==
Lyons was born on 25 May 1956 in Point Fortin. His mother is a Grenadian and his father is Trinidadian.

== Career ==
Lyons became famous from his first entry into the calypso tent world in 1980 with "Soca Baptist," a song he penned in 1979. "Soca Baptist" won him his first Carnival Road March Monarch award in 1980. He won the Road March title a total of ten times. With triumphs in 1980, 1981 and 1983 as Blue Boy, and as Superblue in 1991, 1992, 1993, 1995, 2000, 2013 and 2018. He also won the Soca Monarch title seven times.

In 2011 he received the SAO Hall of Fame Award. In 2020 a street in Lyons' hometown of Point Fortin was named after him. In 2021 Lyons was also awarded, the Hummingbird Medal Gold, by the Government of Trinidad and Tobago.

== Personal life ==
Superblue has five biological children and two step children. His two daughters with fellow calypsonian Lady Gypsy, Terri Lyons and Fay-Ann Lyons-Alvarez, are both soca/calypso artists. Fay-Ann is a three time T&T Road March champion, while Terri won the 2020 & 2026 Calypso Monarch title.

== Discography ==
- Soca in the Shaolin Temple (1981)
- Tic Tac Toe (1982)
- Superman (1983)
- 10th Anniversary (Vinyl)
- Happy Carnival (1995)
- Flag Party (1994)
- Bacchanal Time (1993)
- Soca Matrix (2000)
- Extreme Blue (2009)
- Joy (2011)

== Notable firsts ==
- First calypsonian to ever perform at Wembley Convention Centre in London, UK
- First Soca Monarch winner
- "Bacchanal Time" and "Birthday Party" performances appeared on the first worldwide broadcast of Trinidad and Tobago Carnival via CNN
- First double winner of Soca Monarch and Road March in the same year with Bacchanal Time in 1993
- Only calypsonian to appear on Sesame Street
