= Maximus Dan =

Trinidad and Tobago musician

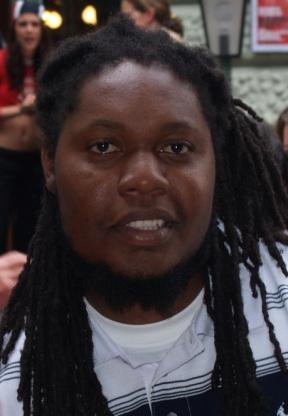
Maximus Dan (2006)

MX Prime previously Maximus Dan (born as Edghill Thomas on 1979 in Carenage, Trinidad and Tobago) is a Trinidadian soca / dancehall musician. He is also known by his former stage name Maga Dan.

After working with Jamaican producer Danny Browne between 1997 and 2000, and releasing dancehall and reggae influenced music, Maximus Dan moved in the direction of soca and has developed his own style. His biggest hit single to date was "Fighter", which was made for the Soca Warriors (the Trinidad and Tobago national football team) in 2006. "Fighter" became the rallying song for the first ever appearance by Trinidad and Tobago in the FIFA World Cup finals in Germany.

His song "Love Generation" is featured on the Cricket 07 game by EA Sports for the PC and PlayStation.

== History ==
Born and raised in the fishing village of Carenage on Trinidad's west coast, Edghill Thomas, was at first known as Magadan. He made a name for himself with a few local hits and was eager to collaborate with more established artists.

He signed with Main Street Records in 1997, becoming one of the first artists out of Trinidad to work with a major Jamaican label. Under the supervision of producer Danny Browne, he was a featured artist on the single Do you see what I see on the filthy rhythm with label mates Red Rat, Hawkeye, Goofy, General Degree and others. The rhythm sold well globally.

In 2000 he adopted the "Maximus Dan" moniker and had a string of hits with his own style of soca music. He used his unique voice to deliver conscious messages over driving blends of soca and dancehall music.

When the news came that Trinidad and Tobago’s national football team had qualified for the FIFA 2006 World Cup the streets erupted in spontaneous euphoria. The song on everyone’s lips, some with tears streaming down their faces was Soca Warrior by Maximus Dan.
