= Krosfyah =

Barbadian Soca band

- Origin: Barbados
- Genres: Soca
- Years active: 1989–present
- Labels: Kalinago, VP, Crossfire
- Members: Edwin Yearwood; Anthony Bailey; Mario Burnett; Neil Burnett; Antonio Rudder; Corey Jordan
- Past members: Leslie Lett; Felix Lord *Khiomal Nurse; Dwain Antrobus; Michael Agard; Elvis Edwards; Cameron "Doc" Quintyne; Mark Husbands; Sherwin King; Ray Armstrong; Sharon Darlington; Morris Cassell; Henderson Quimby

Krosfyah (pronounced "Crossfire") is a Soca band from the Caribbean island of Barbados. The group is best known for the hits "Road Jam", "Pump Me Up", and "Sak Passe".

== History ==
Formed in 1989 from the earlier band Higher Level by Edwin Yearwood, Michael Agard, Felix Ford, and Anthony Bailey, Crossfire (as they were initially known) initially played covers and local folk songs on the Barbados tourist circuit of hotels and nightclubs.

In 1993 they took part in tour of the Caribbean sponsored by the Barbados Tourist Board, and around the same times as the band name spelling changed to Krosfyah, also moved to performing mainly original material. Debut single "Hot Tempo", was followed by the album Ultimate Party in 1994, the band going on to win the Barbados Band of the Year title.

The band's 1995 single "Pump Me Up" was successful in their home country, and in 1997 went gold in Canada.

In 1995 the band's second album Ultimate Party-Pump Me Up was released, going on to sell more than 50,000 copies, and Yearwood became the first artist to win all three of the Party Monarch, Road Monarch, and Calypso King titles at the Crop Over festival, also going on to win titles in later years, including five Party Monarch titles and 'Tune of the Crop' six times. The band's success across the Caribbean continued with the 1996 album Aim High and the single "Wet Me", and Fyah Riddims (1997).

Reigning World Soca Monarch Ray "Papi Chulo" Armstrong joined, and in 1998 they released Hot Zone and played in the US and Europe.

Yearwood also started releasing solo material in 2000.

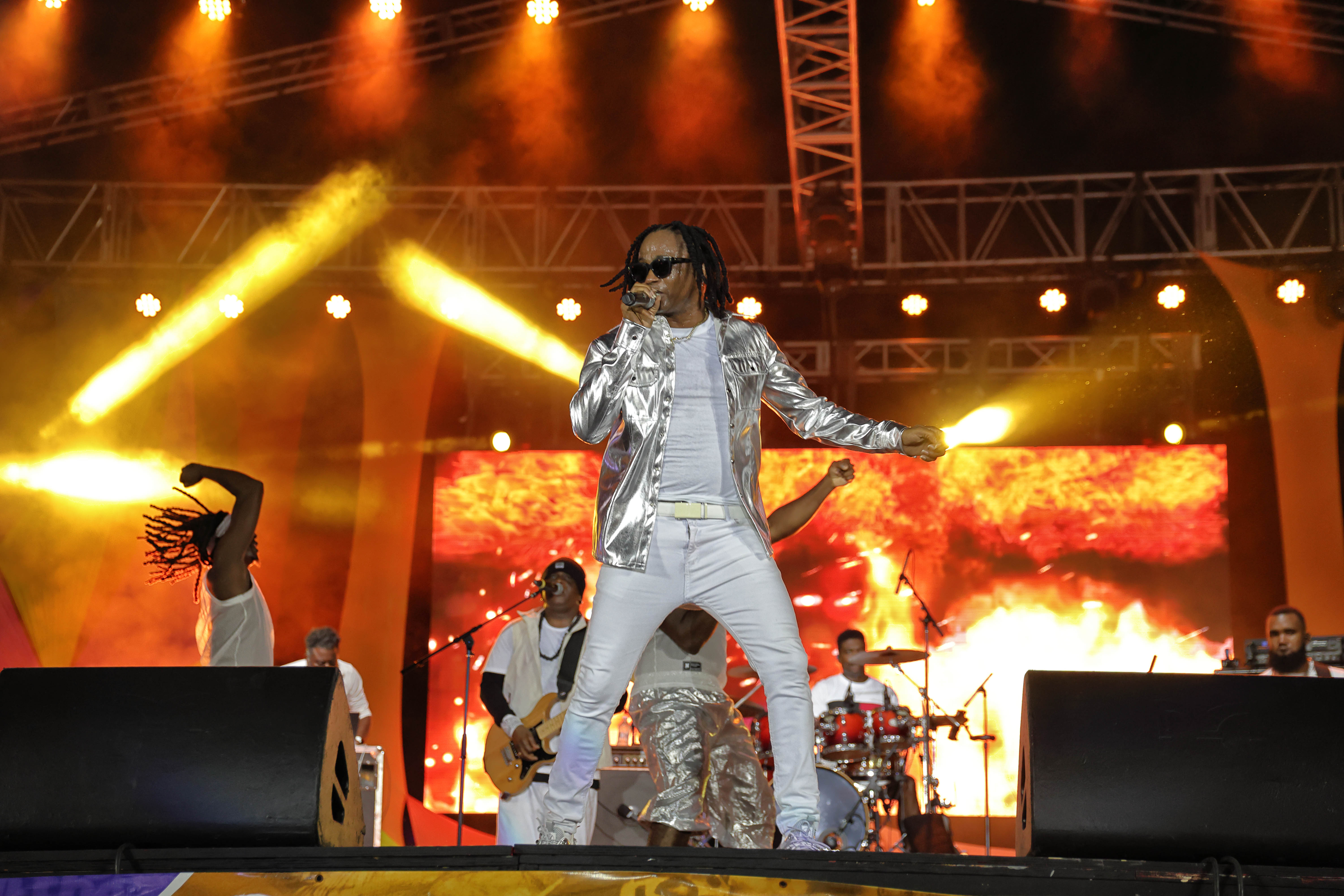
Edwin Yearwood of Krosfyah

In 2004 they 'banned' Liberty FM Radio's Tony "Admiral" Nelson from playing their music in response to what they perceived to be negative statements he made about Barbadian artists.

Krosfyah has gone on to become one of the best known and most successful Soca bands of the Caribbean. Their worldwide sales have topped 300,000.

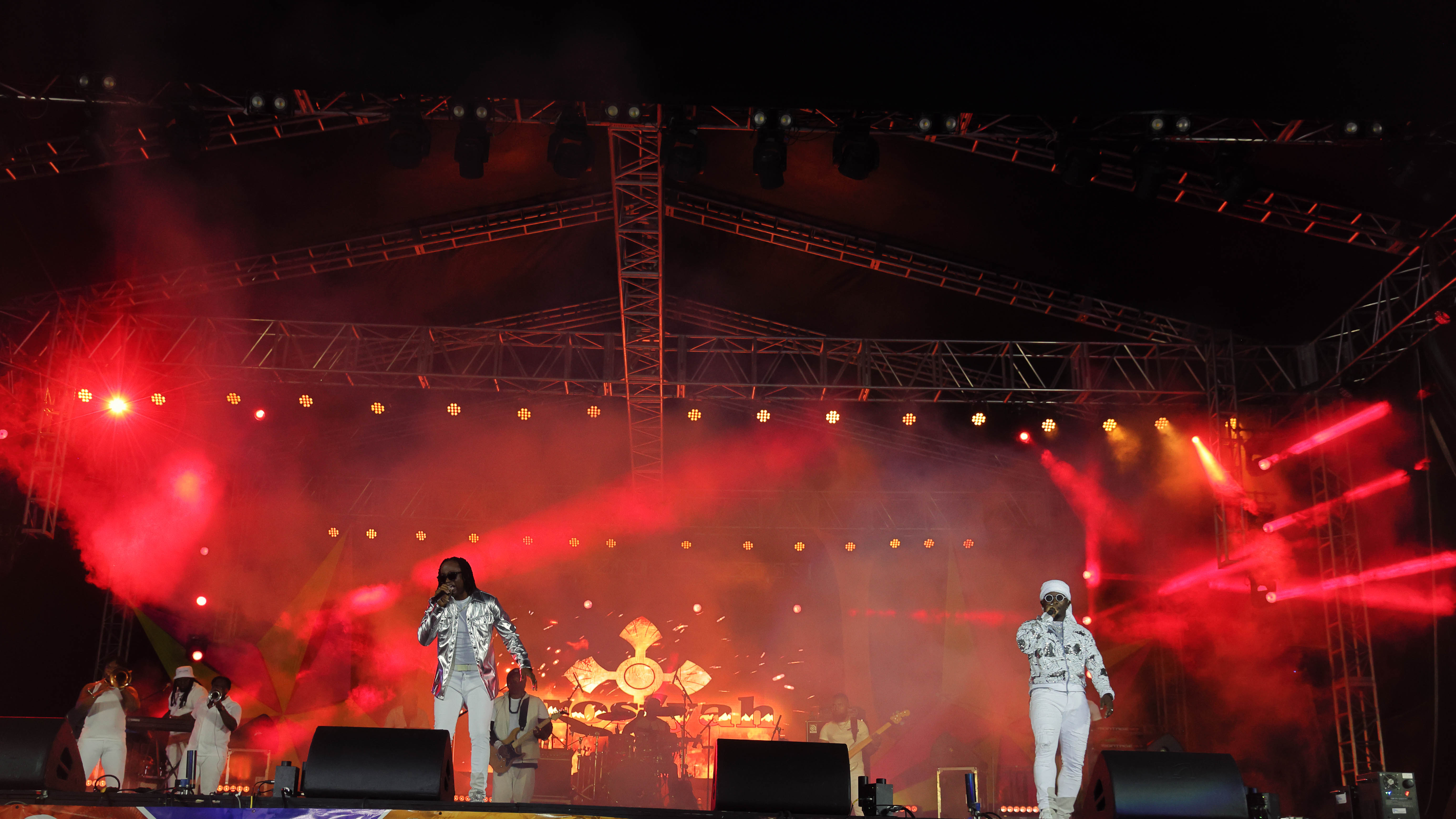
Krosfyah performing at Crop Over

== Discography ==
- Ultimate Party (1994), Kalinago
- Ultimate Party-Pump Me Up (1995), Kalinago
- Aim High (1996), Kalinago
- Fyahside Christmas (1997), Crossfire
- Fyah Riddims (1997), Kalinago
- Krosfyah 97 EP (1997), Steel Donkey
- Hot Zone (1998), VP
- krosfyah.com (1999), Crossfire
- Kool Under Fire (2001), Caribbean
- Lock Down (2002), Crossfire
- Enchanted (2003), Crossfire
- Zero Tolerance (2004), Crossfire
- Timeless (2005), Krosfyah Ventures
- Everblazin (2006), Crossfire
- Fire Proof (2007), Crossfire
- The Experience (2012), Faluma
- One On One (2012), Faluma
- Kings of the Groove (2012), Faluma
- The Journey (2012), Faluma

Compilations

- The Best of Krosfyah (2000), Crossfire
- The Best of Krosfyah, Vol.2 (2003), Crossfire
- 20th Anniversary Special Edition (2000), Crossfire
