= Calypso Rose =

Tobagonian calypsonian (born 1940)

- Calypso Rose in 2016

Background information
- Also known as: Crusoe Kid
- Born: Linda McArtha Monica Sandy-Lewis (or McCartha Linda Sandy-Lewis); April 27, 1940 (age 86); Bethel Village, Tobago, Trinidad and Tobago
- Genres: Calypso; soca
- Occupations: Musician; songwriter
- Instrument: Vocalist
- Years active: 1964–present
- Label: Because Music
- Website: Official website

Calypso Rose or Linda McCartha Monica Sandy-Lewis (born April 27, 1940, in Bethel Village, Tobago) is a Trinidad and Tobago calypsonian. She started writing songs at the age of 13; over the years, she has composed more than 1000 songs and recorded more than 20 albums. Considered the "mother of calypso", Rose was the first female calypso star and her lyrics frequently address social issues like racism and sexism. Her influence over the calypso music genre forced the renaming of the Calypso King competition to the Calypso Monarch instead. In addition to writing songs about social issues, Rose is also an activist and was given the title of UNICEF Goodwill Ambassador for former child soldiers along with performing at numerous events for social change. She has received every award available to living artists in the Caribbean.

She currently resides in Queens, New York, and regularly returns to Trinidad and Tobago in addition to touring.

== Early life ==
Calypso Rose was born with the name Linda McCartha Monica Sandy-Lewis. Her mother gave her this name as an homage a respectable army general by the name of Douglas MacArthur. At the beginning of her music career, the singer originally took the name Crusoe Kid but later changed it to Calypso Rose. This occurred when she auditioned for the managers of a calypso tent called Young Brigade. The name Crusoe Kid was meant to signify her origins in Tobago, and a reference to the novel Robinson Crusoe. After hearing her perform, the managers at Young Brigade renamed her Calypso Rose because a rose is considered the mother of all flowers and she considers herself the mother of female calypsonians that came after her. She grew up in the small village of Bethel on the island of Tobago, one of the two Caribbean islands forming Trinidad and Tobago and the birthplace of calypso. Rose's earliest memory is her grandmother sitting at the seashore and telling her that no one knows where they would be buried because her grandmother was originally from French Guinea and ended up in Tobago because she was kidnapped and sold there. Calypso Rose was the fourth child to be born by her mother, Dorchea Sandy, who had a total of thirteen children, two of which died. Her father, Altino Sandy, was a leader of the Spiritual Shouter Baptists. In addition to being a leader in the church, he was also a fisherman and Rose would to go with him every evening to the beach when she lived with him. To this day, Calypso Rose says she drinks seamoss, and eats a lot of fish, ginger, garlic, and banana to give her the energy to put on a powerful show. Her family was very traditional and were initially opposed to her singing in Carnival tents; her father saying that "calypso belongs to the devil" She lived with her parents and her ten siblings in a two-bedroom house until she was nine-years-old, at which point she went to live with her aunt and uncle on the neighboring island of Trinidad. Her aunt, Edith Robinson, was wanting a child so she suggested to her husband that he go to his brother, Altino Sandy, and ask to take care of one of his children. Ms. Edith Robinson came and asked for Rose's permission to adopt her, Rose agreed and went with her to Trinidad. Shortly after arriving in Trinidad, she began to get bullied because she was a 'small islander' which she didn't expect because she thought Trinidad and Tobago was one place.

One of the many struggles that Rose endured was being raped at the age of 18 and ever since then she has not pursued a relationship with a man. Rose came out in an interview as a lesbian at the age of 72 and was married to woman for 17 years by then. Her health was not always in its best form as she faced and survived breast cancer in 1996, stomach cancer in 1998, diabetes, and two heart attacks which was solved by a pacemaker.

== Career ==
When she went to live with her uncle and aunt, her aunt was a big influence on her love of calypsos because of the many records that she owned and the freedom she would give her. Rose then began to write her first calypso called "Glass Thief" which signified her shock to Trinidad after her aunt gave her money and told her to go to the market where she saw boys stealing eyeglasses from someone's face. This was the start of her voicing her opinion on gender equality and later on writing her second calypso that empowered women to dance. Calypso Rose began singing at calypso tents in the 1950s at the age of 15 going against her harsh critics, and had the opportunity to perform in different places from Grenada, St. Vincent to the US Virgin Islands . A large influencer and supporter of Rose was a man named Lord Kitchener, a calypsonian who was the first to recognize her as a composer. From 1963 to 1965, she would continue to perform in his tent. She knew Lord Kitchener from the age of 9 and he was known for his influence on many young calypso singers because of the songs he would make. Even with many of the religious elders in Trinidad's disapproval for Rose's participation in calypsos, she was able to win them over with her song "Abide With Me" which is about hurricane Florence that hit Tobago and Grenada in 1964. In 1966 she would perform with a very well known calypsonian in many occasions by the name of the 'Mighty Sparrow' (Slinger Francisco). Despite many people's misconceptions, Rose was not the first female calypso singer. However, with her song "Cooperation", she was able to compete outside of Tobago and Trinidad against other male calypsonians and win her first title as Calypso King in the Virgin Islands and win Virgin Island's Road March in the same year. In 1966, she wrote the song "Fire in Meh Wire" that had gone international and was translated into eight different languages, and was the first calypso to run two years in a row at the Trinidad Carnival. With the making of another song called "Tempo", Rose was able to become the first female to win the national Road March title with "Gimme More Tempo". Soon after, in 1978, she performed "Her Majesty" and "I Thank Thee" and was able to win another national Road March and became the first to win Calypso King with "Come Leh We Jam", which changed to Calypso Monarch because of the successful integration of females in a male-dominated competition. By the mid-1970s Rose had located to Queens, New York. She recorded for the Brooklyn-based calypso labels Straker's Records and Charlie's Records, and used the city as a base for international touring. Her 1977 Road March winning song, “Tempo,” was written while riding the New York subway. In 2016 she released a song titled "Calypso Queen" in which she confirms her reign. In 1979 Calypso Rose performed in a concert put on by the Colombia's Caribbean Students' Association and was later reviewed by Robert Palmer (writer) from the New York Times. Palmer tells how powerful she was as a performer including a quote by the master of ceremonies for the evening; "people who will not trust politicians will listen to the common sense commentary of a celebrated calypso singer and song-writer like Calypso Rose".

Rose has collaborated with many artists. In 1967, Rose and Bob Marley performed together in the Grand Ballroom in New York City and later they got to perform together once again in Miami. Rose's relationship with Marley was very close; she named him an inspiration. Other music legends that she got to meet are Michael Jackson and Miriam Makeba in 1978 when she won Trinidad Road March. Her album "Far From Home" led her to collaborate with French/Spanish singer Manu Chao who sang three songs from her album 'Leave Me Alone", "Far From Home", and "Human Race". The album was produced by Ivan Duran. The two were first introduced when her manager, Mr. Jean Micheal invited Chao to the Carnival season in 2015 where Calypso Rose recounted that they spoke for 3 hours about music. She gave him an early copy of the album which he later mixed and added in his own vocals. Calypso Rose has continued to collaborate with other artists, including Machel Montano in a song called "Young Boy" and Kobo Town in a song called "Scarborough Girl" in 2018 with home she performed with in 2019, and helped co-write some of her songs from her album "Far From Home". Calypso Rose is still actively writing new music and carries around a tape recorder with her to keep track of her ideas. In October 2019, she released a song titled "Baila Mami" from the new Calypso Rose & Friends EP featuring Nailah Blackman, Lao Ra, Manu Chao, Machel Montano, Patrice, Tim Armstrong & The Interrupters and King Doudou. The song is a mix of Spanish and English encouraging women to break free and dance.

Calypso Rose's music, known for its political and social justice narrative, has had significant impact. Her song "No Madam", about the practice of labor exploitation in the Caribbean, led to the government of Trinidad and Tobago enacting minimum wage for civil servants. There were other songs like "The Boat is Rocking" which signified a time in which there was a critical local election occurring. Her album "Far From Home" exemplifies the narrative of social and political injustice like her song "I Am African" which is about the black diaspora.

In an interview, Rose said that her two proudest moments in life was when she was named Calypso Monarch and when she won the French Grammy award, Victoire de la Musique, in Paris in 2017 because of her album "Far From Home".

Alongside her career in music Calypso Rose was a part of many documentaries including "Calypso at Dirty Jim's", and "Calypso Rose, Lioness in the Jungle". "Calypso at Dirty Jim's" was directed by Pascale Obolo and was produced in 2005 which discusses many Caribbean artists like Mighty Sparrow, Mighty Terror, Bomber, Lord Superior, and Calypso Rose. "Calypso Rose, Lioness in the Jungle" was produced in 2011 which was also made by Pascale Obolo, and it follows Rose's life as a prominent voice and ambassador of Caribbean music.

In 2019, Rose performed at Coachella, marking the first time a calypso performer played a full set at the festival. At 78, she became the festival's oldest performer to date.

== Discography ==
=== Studio albums ===
Year	Title
1969	Queen of the Calypso World
1971	Calypso Queen of the World
1972	Sexy Hot Pants
1977	Action Is Tight
1978	Her Majesty
1979	Mass Fever
1980	We Rocking for Carnival
1981	Ah Can’t Wait
1982	Mass in California
1983	Rose Goes Soca Unlimited
1984	Trouble
1985	Calypso Train; Pan in Town
1986	Stepping Out
1987	Leh We Punta
1989	Soca Explosion
1990	Soul on Fire
1991	Jump with Power
1992	Rosie Doh Hurt Them
1993	Breaking the Sound Barrier; Soca Diva
1996	Tobago
1999	Ringbang Queen
2000	Jesus Is My Rock
2003	Calypso at Dirty Jim’s
2008	Calypso Rose
2016	Far from Home
2018	So Calypso!

=== Compilations ===
- The Golden Hits of Calypso Rose (1986)
- The Best of Calypso Rose (2005)

=== EPs and singles ===
- Calypso Rose and Friends (EP, 2019)
- Heavenly Sweetness Loves Calypso Rose (EP, 2020)
- Watina (single, 2022)

== Awards and honours ==
- 1978: Award for Unprecedented Achievement by a Calypsonian from the Trinidad and Tobago Alliance of the USA
- 1978: Distinguished Achievement Award for the First Triple Crown Calypso Monarch of the World by The Tobago Benevolent Society
- 1979: Award for Magnanimous Contribution to the Culture by the Caribbean Arts and Culture Council
- 1982: Rose was named an honorary citizen of Belize in 1982 in recognition of her work to raise the country's international awareness on the cultural front
- 1983: Top Female Calypsonian by the Smithsonian Institution, Washington D.C.
- 1985: Best Female Recording Artist Award by C.E.I.
- 1986: Recognition for Achievement in Human Progress from the Concerned Citizens of Liberia Organization
- 1988: Gratitude and Commendation for the Development of Arts and Culture in Belize by the National Arts Council of Belize
- 1988: Appointment as Foremost Ambassador of Culture by the West Indian Day Association
- 1989: Humanitarian Award by Sunshine Music Awards
- 1989: Recognition for contribution to the steelpan by the Calypso and Steelband Music Awards
- 1989: Best Party Song by the Sunshine Music Awards
- 1989: Best Female Vocalist by the Sunshine Music Awards
- 1990: Nafeita Lifetime Achievement Award
- 1991: Outstanding Female in the Field of Music Award by the National Woman's Action Committee
- 1991: Most Outstanding Woman in Trinidad and Tobago by the National Women's Action Committee
- 1993: Inducted into the Tobago Walk of Fame as a charter member
- 1993: Honored by the mayor of St. Catharines, Ontario, Canada, with the keys to the City
- 2011: Africa Festival Lifetime Achievement Award
- 2014: Honorary Doctor of Letters - University of the West Indies
- 2016: WOMEX Artist of the Year Award
- 2017: Calypso Rose's Far From Home won the World Music Album of the Year contest at the 32nd annual French music award ceremony, Les Victoires de la Musique
- 2017: The Order of the Republic of Trinidad and Tobago, the highest honor in the country

== Films ==
- 1979 - Bacchanal Time
- 1991 - One Hand Don't Clap
- 2011 - Calypso Rose: the Lioness of the Jungle
