= BRT =

BRT may refer to:

== Businesses and organizations ==
- Bayrak Radio Television, a Turkish Cypriot broadcaster
- Belgische Radio- en Televisieomroep (now VRT), a Flemish broadcaster
- Business Research and Training Center (BR&T), Ho Chi Minh City University of Technology, Ho Chi Minh City, Vietnam
- Business Roundtable, an American lobbying group
- Brain Research Trust, a British medical charity
- BRT Laboratories, an American biotech firm
- BRT S.p.A., a Geopost-controlled Italian courier

== Places ==
- Big Round Top, Gettysburg, Pennsylvania, US
- Bradford Robotic Telescope, on Tenerife, Spain

== Transportation ==
- BA Connect (ICAO airline code BRT), British airline
- Block register territory, a method for dispatching trains
- Boeing Research and Technology (BR&T), Boeing Phantom Works
- British Rail Telecommunications
- Brookhaven Rail Terminal, Yaphank, Brookhaven, Long Island, New York State, USA
- Brooklyn Rapid Transit Company, a former transit holding company in New York City
- Brotherhood of Railroad Trainmen, a former US railroad union
- Bus rapid transit
  - Bangkok BRT, Thailand
  - BRT Sunway Line, a bus system in Malaysia
  - Dhaka BRT, Bangladesh
  - Transjakarta, Jakarta, Indonesia; world's largest BRT network
  - Tokyo BRT, Japan
  - Amman Bus Rapid Transit, Jordan
- UD BRT, a UD Trucks bus
- Bathurst Island Airport (IATA airport code "BRT"), Wurrumiyanga, Bathurst Island, Northern Territory, Australia
- Bruttoregistertonne, a unit of ship's total internal volume

== Other uses ==
- Bitare language (ISO 639 language code brt), a West African language
- Black Russian Terrier, a dog breed
- Brasília time (BRT), UTC−03:00, see Time in Brazil#Brasília time
- Base Resistance Controlled Thyristor
- Boosted regression tree, gradient boosting used in machine learning

== See also ==
- "Brrt" (also known as "Brrrt", "Brrrrt"), 2007 song by 'Bunji Garlin' off the album Global ('Bunji Garlin' album)
