= B.O.D.Y. (album) =

Studio album by Machel Montano
- Released: March 7, 2006
- Recorded: 2005, 2006
- Genre: Soca
- Length: 57:03
- Label: Mad Bull Music
- Producer: Machel Montano

Machel Montano chronology
The Xtatik Experience (2005)	B.O.D.Y. (2006)	Book of Angels (2007)

B.O.D.Y. or Band Of D Year is an album released by popular Soca artist Machel Montano and his group Xtatik from Trinidad and Tobago in 2006. The album features several solo and collaborative tracks, with popular artists such as: American Doug E. Fresh, Jamaicans Mr Vegas & T.O.K., Trinidadians Patrice Roberts and Benjai.

The title song Band Of De Year on the album won the 2006 Road March Competition for Trinidad and Tobago Carnival. This was the second time Machel Montano won the competition, previously with Big Truck on the Heavy Duty album in 1997.

== Track listing ==
1. "Scandal (Delirious)"
2. ""Band Of D Year (B.O.D.Y.)" – (with Patrice Roberts)
3. "Dance With You (Reggaeton Remix)" – (featuring Mr Vegas)
4. "La Vida Es En Carnival" – remix of original from Celia Cruz
5. "Amnesty (Rah, Rah, Rah)" – (featuring Benjai)
6. "Forever" – (featuring Onika Bostic)
7. "O'Larki" – (featuring Andy Singh & Fabien Canning Downing)
8. "Madology (King Kong Crew)" – (featuring Kerwin Du Bois)
9. "Scandal (Delirious) (Road Mix)"
10. "Band Of De Year (B.O.D.Y.) (Road Mix)" – (with Patrice Roberts)
11. "Oh Girl" – (featuring Prestan Andries)
12. "We Not Giving Up (Remix)" – (featuring Doug E. Fresh and T.O.K.)
13. "Heart of a Man" – (with Zan)
