= Mighty Cypher =

- Also known as: Lord Cypher
- Born: Dillary Scott
- Origin: Trinidad
- Genre: Calypso
- Years active: 1940s–1990s

Mighty Cypher aka Lord Cypher was a Trinidadian calypsonian who won the Calypso King title at the 1967 carnival.

Known as the 'Clown Prince of Calypso', Cypher was an established calypsonian since the 1940s and appeared on the Cook Records compilations Calpypso Kings and Pink Gin (1958, with "PNM Balisier"), Calypso Atrocities (1959, with "Sailor Man in Donkey Pants") and Calypso Exposed (1961 with "Love Miss Dove").

After finishing as runner-up in 1956 (to Mighty Sparrow), Mighty Cypher won the 1967 Calypso King title with the songs "Last Elections" and "If the Priest Could Play". This victory led to the issue of a postage stamp in Trinidad and Tobago bearing his image.

He continued to perform and was a regular in the Original Young Brigade tent at the carnival into the 1990s.

Scott is known to be deceased.
