= Heavenly Drum =

Studio album by Machel Montano
- Released: June 19, 2009
- Recorded: 2008, 2009
- Genre: Soca
- Length: 61:01
- Label: Ruf Rex Records Ltd
- Producer: Machel Montano

Machel Montano chronology
Flame On/Winning Season (2008)	Heavenly Drum (2009)	Album 34 (2010)

Heavenly Drum is an album released by popular Soca artist Machel Montano from Trinidad and Tobago in 2009. It was first launched at J&R Music World in New York City on June 19, 2009. The album marks Machel Montano's third solo release after rebranding to Machel Montano HD in 2007.

The album features several solo and collaborative tracks with popular artists such as: Bermudian Collie Buddz, Jamaican Busy Signal, Trinidadians Umi Marcano, Chinese Laundry, Make It Hapn and Len "Boogsie" Sharpe & Phase 2 (A Steelpan band).

The song Wild Antz on the album placed fourth in the 2009 Road March Competition and the song Magic Drumz, played by the Phase 2 Steel Orchestra, placed second in the "Large Bands" category at the Panorama Finals steelpan competition at Trinidad and Tobago Carnival.

== Track listing ==
1. "Mesmerize"
2. "Fly Away" – (featuring Collie Buddz)
3. "Push Bumpers (Remix)" – (featuring Busy Signal)
4. "Block to Block" – (featuring Umi Marcano)
5. "Ravin"
6. "Won't Stop"
7. "Oil & Music (Remix)"
8. "Magic Drum (Remix)" – (featuring Chinese Laundry)
9. "Stunning"
10. "Wild Antz"
11. "Push Bumpers"
12. "Pray" – (featuring Make It Hapn)
13. "Magic Drum" – (featuring Len "Boogsie" Sharpe & Phase 2)
14. "Wild Antz" (Road Mix)
15. "Jumbie Antz" Mix

(source)
