= Brain Trust (disambiguation) =

The term brain trust (or brains trust, the form more common in British English) may refer to:

- Brain trust, a close group of advisors, including those who advised United States President Franklin D. Roosevelt
- Brain Trust (GetBackers), a secret organization from the anime/manga GetBackers
- Braintrust: What Neuroscience Tells Us about Morality, a 2011 book by Patricia Churchland
- Brain Trust, a 2011 TV pilot produced by Dean Devlin
- A group led by the Janitor in the TV series Scrubs
- A group of villains in Batman Beyond
- The Brains Trust, a British radio/television programme

== See also ==
- Brain Research Trust, a British medical research charity
