= Here Comes the Band =

Here Comes the Band may refer to:

- Here Comes the Band (album), a 2000 album by Xtatik
- Here Comes the Band (film), a 1935 American comedy film
