= The Xtatik Parade =

Studio album by Xtatik
- Released: March 3, 2004
- Recorded: 2003, 2004
- Genre: Soca
- Length: 68:02
- Label: JW Productions
- Producer: Machel Montano

Xtatik chronology
The Xtatik Circus (2003)	The Xtatik Parade (2004)	The Xtatik Experience (2005)

The Xtatik Parade is an album by Trinidadian Soca artist Machel Montano and his band Xtatik released in 2004. the album sold more than 10,000 copies.

== Track listing ==
1. "Craziness"
2. "No War (remix)" - (featuring Fresh Life)
3. "Bubblenut" - (featuring Kerwin Du Bois)
4. "Doh Tell Meh"
5. "Love Fire" - (featuring Black Stalin, Farmer Nappy & Fresh Life)
6. "The Sun"
7. "Dancing"
8. "Marching Band"
9. "Hot Steppin'"
10. "Girls Gone Wild"
11. "Be Yourself" (featuring Nicolas Montano & Meledi Montano)
12. "Get in D Game"
13. "Love Is" - (featuring Trini Jacobs)
14. "Angels" - (featuring KMC)
15. "Carnival (razorshop remix)" - (featuring Destra Garcia)
