= Flame On =

Studio album by Machel Montano
- Released: (Trinidad and Tobago) 16 January 2008 (United States) 11 June 2008
- Recorded: 2007, 2008
- Genre: Soca
- Length: 57:40
- Label: Ruf Rex Records Ltd
- Producer: Machel Montano

Machel Montano chronology
Book of Angels (2007)	Flame On (2008)	Heavenly Drum (2009)

Wining Season
- Cover to the North American release Winning Season which included two additional tracks over the original release.

Professional ratings
Review scores
Source	Rating
TriniJungleJuice.com	(not rated) link

Flame On is an album by Trinidadian soca artist Machel Montano, released in 2008. It was first launched at Trinidad's Club Zen on 16 January 2008. The album marked Montano's second release after rebranding to Machel Montano HD in 2007. A release for the North American market had come out on June 11, 2008 under a different album name, Wining Season.

The album features several solo and collaborative tracks, with popular artists such as: Cuban-American Pitbull, American Lil Jon, Jamaicans Shaggy and Buju Banton, Trinidadians Patrice Roberts, The Mighty Sparrow and David Rudder.

The song Blazin D Trail on the album placed third in the 2008 Road March Competition for Trinidad and Tobago Carnival.

== Track listing ==
=== Trinidad and Tobago release ===
1. "Unconditional Love (Prelude)" – 2:11
2. "Unconditional" – 4:22
3. "Blazin D Trail" – 4:50
4. "Rollin" – (featuring Patrice Roberts) – 5:29
5. "Wining Season" – 3:42
6. "Make Love" – 4:25
7. "Oil & Music" – (featuring David Rudder) – 4:54
8. "Congo Man" – (featuring Mighty Sparrow) – 4:39
9. "Jamishness" – 3:48
10. "We Will Live" – 5:46
11. "Wining Season (remix)" – (featuring Shaggy) – 4:33
12. "Make Love (remix)" – (featuring Buju Banton) – 4:49
13. "Defense (The Anthem)" – (featuring Pitbull, Lil Jon); remix of The Anthem – 4:20

=== United States release ===
1. "Unconditional Love (Prelude)" – 2:11
2. "Unconditional" – 4:22
3. "Wining Season (remix)" – (featuring Shaggy) – 4:33
4. "Make Love" – 4:25
5. "Oil & Music" – (featuring David Rudder) – 4:54
6. "Congo Man" – (featuring Mighty Sparrow) – 4:39
7. "Blazin D Trail" – 4:50
8. "Rollin" – (featuring Patrice Roberts) – 5:29
9. "One More Time (remix)" – (featuring Mr Vegas)
10. "Wining Season" – 3:42
11. "Make Love (remix)" – (featuring Buju Banton) – 4:49
12. "Defense (The Anthem)" – (featuring Pitbull, Lil Jon); remix of The Anthem – 4:20
13. "We Will Live" – 5:46
14. "Higher Than High" – 5:47

(source)
