= Book of Angels =

Book of Angels or variants may refer to:

== Books ==
- Mäṣḥafä Mäla'əkt (Book of Angels) Haymanot Falasha text based on the first part of the Apocalypse of Paul

== Music ==
- "Book of Angels" (2005–2017) a composition series of 32 albums by John Zorn performed by various artists:
  - For a complete listing, see John Zorn discography#Masada Book Two - The Book of Angels
- Book of Angels (Machel Montano album)
