= Byron Lee and the Dragonaires =

Jamaican ska, calypso and soca band (1950–2020)

- Also known as: The Ska Kings, Byron Lee's Dragonaires
- Origin: Jamaica
- Genres: Ska, mento, reggae, calypso, soca
- Years active: 1950–2020
- Labels: WIRL, Dynamic Sounds, JAD

Byron Lee and the Dragonaires (known as Byron Lee's Dragonaires after Lee's death and now The Dragonaires) are a Jamaican ska, calypso and soca band. The band played a crucial pioneering role in bringing Caribbean music to the world. Byron Lee died on 4 November 2008, after suffering from cancer for a sustained period.

== History ==
The band was originally formed around 1950 by Byron Lee and his friend Carl Brady, taking its name from the St. George's College football team for which they played. The band originally played mento, and performed their first shows in the college common room to celebrate the team's victories.

After a few years of playing at parties, birthdays and weddings, Lee decided to turn professional. By 1956, the Dragonaires had become a fixture on Jamaica's hotel circuit, playing under their own name and also providing backing to visiting American stars including Harry Belafonte, Chuck Berry, The Drifters, Sam Cooke, and Fats Domino. The Dragonaires prided themselves on being able to play any style of music, their repertoire including covers of American pop and R&B hits, and they soon adapted to include ska when that became popular.

The band recorded their debut single, "Dumplin's", in 1959 at the WIRL (West Indies Records Limited) studios, owned by future Prime Minister Edward Seaga, who became the band's manager. The single was released on the Dragonaires' own Dragon's Breath label in Jamaica, and was the second release on the Blue Beat label in the United Kingdom. It was unusual for a Jamaican single as it featured an electric organ and a Fender Precision Bass, which Lee had purchased during a visit to the United States—the first such instruments seen on the island. Lee and Seaga both realised that ska was the music to provide Jamaica with a musical identity that could break the domination of American R&B, and the Dragonaires became one of the major ska bands of the early 1960s, releasing singles such as "Fireflies", "Mash! Mr Lee", "Joy Ride", and a ska version of "Over the Rainbow", both under their own name, and as the Ska Kings. In 1961, the band received a huge break when they were cast as the hotel band in the first James Bond film, Dr. No. The band performed several songs in the film, although the recordings were actually made by guitarist Ernest Ranglin. The songs "Jump Up" and "Kingston Calypso" appeared on the Dr. No soundtrack. In 1964, the band was featured in a program called "This is Ska!" alongside Jimmy Cliff, Prince Buster, and Toots and the Maytals.

The band received another major boost when they were selected by Seaga, then the island's head of Social Welfare and Economic Development, in 1964 to travel to the New York World's Fair and perform as a backing band for a showcase of Jamaican talent, including Jimmy Cliff, Prince Buster, and Millie Small. The trip was not a great success, with the Dragonaires' "uptown" musicians not fitting in with the other "downtown" artists. Realising that their appeal to ska crowds was diminishing, Lee took the band in a new direction, incorporating calypso and touring Trinidad and Tobago in 1963 and 1964. Also the band contributed the instrumental part of Mighty Sparrow's recording of Only a Fool in 1966. Lee's relationship with Atlantic Records (he acted as head of distribution for the US company in Jamaica) led to the label releasing Dragonaires records in the US, including two albums timed to capitalise on interest generated from the World's Fair performances, Jump Up and Jamaican Ska (on which the Dragonaires backed the likes of The Blues Busters, The Charmers, The Maytals, Stranger Cole, Ken Boothe, and Patsy Todd). The band also targeted the international rocksteady market with albums of mainly cover versions such as Rock Steady Beat and Rock Steady '67. Further, Atlantic Records tried to push the album Jamaican Ska by using house producer and sound engineer Tom Dowd, who produced all of Aretha Franklin's greatest singles, to produce the album. In addition, the Dragonaires were renamed The Ska Kings on the album. Despite Atlantic's best efforts, Jamaican Ska failed to take off in the United States, although the record "Jamaica Ska" became a top 30 single in Canada.

Lee bought the WIRL studios from Seaga and turned them into Dynamic Sounds Recording Co., where the Dragonaires naturally recorded, using the superior facilities to record a string of well-produced albums during the late 1960s and early 1970s, often containing cover versions aimed at tourists, and they went on to record a series of "Reggay"-titled albums in the early 1970s.

The WIRL name had remained with its division in Barbados and had remained the ever-popular brand of Bajan music until 1995, when it changed its name to E.A. Best Music Ltd, and eventually to its current name, Caribbean Records—still the major record company and distributor of Barbados. Back in Jamaica, Dynamic had become a bigger force than ever before, investing in pressing more of Jamaica's talent to vinyl, including Toots & the Maytals, Eric Donaldson, John Holt, Barry Biggs, Freddie McKay, Tommy McCook, and Max Romeo, issued on imprints such as Jaguar, Panther, Afrik, and Dragon.

In 1974, the band played at Trinidad and Tobago's carnival for the first of many times, and the same year they released the Carnival in Trinidad album. They would release both reggae and carnival-oriented albums throughout the 1970s, and in 1975 took in another genre with the Disco Reggae album, released on Mercury Records in the US.

The band played at the Reggae Sunsplash festival in both 1978 and 1979, and were one of the main backing bands in 1982. They would also appear in 1984 and 1990.

From 1979, the Dragonaires output was heavily concentrated on calypso, soca, and mas, regularly performing at Trinidad and Tobago's carnival, and also touring the Caribbean and North America. It was during this time that many of their most famous calypso songs were recorded, including the hit "Tiny Winey" (1984).

Throughout the 1990s they were also regulars at Jamaica's carnival, and their "Dance Hall Soca" hit (recorded with Admiral Bailey) was credited with starting the ragga-soca craze of the late 1990s.

The band continued to tour, performing with Kevin Lyttle at the Cricket World Cup 2007 opening ceremony.

Byron Lee died on 4 November 2008, aged 73, from cancer.

The band has continued since Lee's death, with the name initially slightly altered to Byron Lee's Dragonaires. They later changed the band name to The Dragonaires as they were no longer able to use Lee's name.

In August 2014, it was announced that Carl Brady would receive the Order of Distinction in October that year.

== Discography ==
=== Albums ===
- Come Fly with Lee (1962)
- The Sound of Jamaica (1963)
- First Class with Lee (1964)
- Caribbean Joyride (1964)
- Dance the Ska (1964)
- Jump Up (1964)
- Christmas Party Time (1966)
- Rock Steady '67 (1967)
- Rock Steady Beat (1967)
- People Get Ready, This Is Rock Steady (1967)
- Byron Lee and the Dragonaires (1968)
- Rock Steady Intensified (1968)
- Reggay with Byron Lee (1968)
- The Many Moods of Lee (1968)
- Reggay Blast Off (1969)
- Reggay Eyes (1969)
- Tighten Up (1969)
- Goin' Places (1970)
- Reggay Splash Down (1971)
- Reggay Hot Cool and Easy (1972)
- Reggay Roun' the World (1973)
- Reggae Fever (1974)
- Dancing Is Forever (1974)
- Carnival in Trinidad (1974)
- The Midas Touch (1974)
- Carnival 75 (1975)
- Disco Reggae (1975)
- Reggay International (1976)
- Six Million Dollar Man (1976)
- This Is Carnival (1976)
- Art of Mas (1977)
- Jamaica's Golden Hits (1977)
- More Carnival (1978)
- Reggae Hits (1978)
- Carnival Experience (1979)
- Soca Carnival (1980)
- Carnival '81 (1981)
- Byron 1982 (1982)
- Soft Lee Vol 1 (1983)
- Soul Ska (1983)
- Carnival City '83 (1983)
- Original Rock Steady Hits (1984)
- Jamaica's Golden Hits Vol 2 (1984)
- Heat in De Place (1984)
- Christmas in the Tropics (1984)
- Wine Miss Tiny (1985)
- Soca Girl (1986)
- Soca Thunder (1987)
- De Music Hot Mama (1988)
- Soca Bacchanal (1989)
- Jamaica Carnival '90 (1990)
- Carnival Fever (1991)
- Wine Down (1992)
- Dance Hall Soca (1993)
- Soca Butterfly (1994)
- Soca Tatie (1995)
- Soca Engine (1996)
- Soca Greatest Hits (1997)
- Trinidad Tobago Carnival City (1997)
- Socarobics (1997)
- Soca Frenzy (1998)
- Soca Tremor (1999)
- Soca Fire Inna Jamdown Stylee
- Jump and Wave for Jesus (1999)
- Soca Thriller (2000)
- Soca Vibes (2001)
- Caribbean Sty-Lee (2002)
- Sexy Body (2003)
- Jamaica Ska & Other Jamaican Party Anthems (2004)
- Sweet Music (2004)
- Soca Royal (2008)
- The Man and His Music (2010)
