= Only a Fool Breaks His Own Heart =

Song

"Only a Fool Breaks His Own Heart" is a song that was composed in Brooklyn New York in 1964 by Norman Bergen and Shelly Coburn in response to a request by United Artists Music who was looking for songs for British duo Chad & Jeremy. Going for a British sound, Bergen started with a chord progression based on The Beatles’ “I Want to Hold Your Hand” and Coburn added a lyric. The writers did not receive the usual $25 or $50 advance, but the company did pay for a one-hour demo recording which took place with studio players including Frank Owens (piano) and Kenny Karen (vocals). The session ended early so producer Ken Lauber spent the final ten minutes changing the original uptempo concept to a ballad approach. He asked Karen to do his best Jerry Butler impression, and asked Owens to play the way he had on the Dionne Warwick records (that piano part is still copied today on many of the newer versions of the song.) The next day, at Coburn’s suggestion, the writers took the demo to Hy Weiss at Old Town Records for jazz singer Arthur Prysock. Old Town used the demo track, added Prysock’s vocal plus strings arranged by Mort Garson, and it became the next single.

== Success Overseas ==
The record received ‘easy listening’ airplay but not much in the way of sales. However, the song took off overseas through cover versions in the Caribbean Islands including #1 calypso singer Mighty Sparrow, and a Finnish translation by Juha Vainio as “Muisto vain jää", a top five hit performed by Jouko and Kosti. In 1968, the song was included on Tom Jones' #1 LP Delilah.

The version by The Mighty Sparrow with Byron Lee & the Dragonaires charted in 1969 in the UK as well as in the Netherlands, where it re-entered the charts in 1977, spending a staggering 27 weeks on the charts and peaking at #2 in the spring of 1978. During its charts stay, in March 1978, “Only a Fool” appeared in Billboard Magazine's International Charts section at #8 in the Netherlands by Mighty Sparrow, released by United Artists Records. The record company’s Dutch affiliate had not realized the incorrect writer and publisher information was edited on the label: the song had been credited to Slinger Francisco, Mighty Sparrow’s real name. The situation was later corrected and the record would become the #3 hit of 1978.

The song has since become a true standard in Finland as “Muisto vain jää”, with recent versions by Harri Marstio, Kari Tapio, Pekka Tiilikainen and Beatmakers, The Heartbreakers, and inclusion in the soundtrack of the 2009 film Rööperi (aka Hellsinki).

It has also been translated into Dutch as "Zonder Gevoel" by Jan Rot, Swedish as "Bara ett fån gör så mot sig själv" by Moneybrother (Anders Wendin), and German as "Noch einen Tag und es ist aus".

== Current activity ==
There are now more than 80 versions of the song with new recordings all the time. In some ways it has come full circle. In recent years it was recorded by Dion DiMucci who is from the Bronx, the first by a New York singer since 1965; it was recently performed at Brooklyn College in New York by the Mighty Sparrow, a few blocks from where the song was first written. It has been recorded in most styles including pop, blues, r&b, c&w, rock, and reggae, and can be found on internet lists from ‘Words of Inspiration’ to ‘The Most Depressing Songs of All Time’, and is even mentioned on a website devoted to vampires.

In addition to the aforementioned mistake in the Netherlands, quite a few singer-songwriters have been credited with the composition, some by their own doing, and some through the assumptions of others. Arthur Prysock admitted that he had told people he wrote the song, but corrected things before a Los Angeles audience in 1988. One recording artist apparently told the president of a record label that he had written a ‘great new song’ and then played his version of “Only a Fool…” over the phone.

== Recorded versions ==
- 1965 Arthur Prysock
- 1966 Mighty Sparrow with Byron Lee & the Dragonaires (Trinidad & Tobago/Jamaica); listed as: “Only a Fool”
- 1966 Long John Baldry (U.K.); re-issued in 1967
- 1967 Lord Brynner (Trinidad); steel drums instrumental; listed as “Only a Fool”
- 1967 Jackie Edwards (Jamaica)
- 1968 Dandy Livingstone
- 1968 Tom Jones (U.K.) Delilah album
- 1968 Jouko and Kosti (Finland) top five single (in 2009 film Rööperi aka Hellsinki)
- 1970 Tui Fox (Australia)
- 1971 Vigon (France)
- 1972 Oscar Harris & Billy Jones & The Twinkle Stars (Netherlands) Ballads album
- 1977 Mighty Sparrow with Byron Lee & the Dragonaires (1966 recording re-issued in the Netherlands; 27 weeks on charts)
- 1978 Mighty Sparrow (U.K.) (new recording); 2 million sold in Caribbean islands
- 1980 Pat Kelly (Jamaica)
- 1988 Arthur Prysock (new recording)
- 1996 Jan Rot (Netherlands) (in Dutch as “Zonder gevoel”)
- 1997 Wyclef Jean under new title "Prelude to: ‘To All the Girls'" aka "To All the Girls" (Prelude); (uses excerpt of Mighty Sparrow recording; 2 million sold)
- 2001 Nick Lowe (U.K.) (featured on NPR's All Songs Considered in 2002; CBS TV series Hack in 2003)
- 2001 Dion DiMucci (only available as bonus single on box set: The Wanderer; Then & Now)
- 2001 Sly & Robbie (Jamaica)
- 2005 Mighty Sparrow (DVD) (Sparrow in Concert Live)
- 2005 Kari Tapio (Finland)
- 2006 Moneybrother (Sweden); translated as "Bara ett fån gör så mot sig själv" (Album debuted at #2 on Swedish top 60)
