= Charge (Machel Montano album) =

Studio album by Xtatik
- Released: March 10, 1998
- Recorded: 1997, 1998
- Genre: Soca
- Labels: JW Productions, Mad Bull Music
- Producer: Machel Montano

Xtatik chronology
Xtatik Live (1997)	Charge (1998)	Any Minute Now (1999)

Charge is an album by Trinidadian soca artist Machel Montano and his band Xtatik released in 1998 by JW Productions.

== Background ==
Artists such as Andre Tanker, Lord Nelson and Shaggy appeared on the album.

== Critical reception ==
Professional ratings
Review scores
Source	Rating
AllMusic	4/5 stars

Allmusic gave the album a four out of five stars rating.

== Singles ==
Toro Toro featuring Shaggy peaked at No. 19 on the UK Independent Singles chart.

== Track listing ==
1. "Mad Bull Intro"
2. "Toro Toro (Original)"
3. "Xtatik Prayer (Interlude)"
4. "Stand Up" - (featuring Andre Tanker)
5. "Footsteps"
6. "Feeling 2 Fete"
7. "Jeunes Agape (Interlude)"
8. "Set My Music Free"
9. "Trumpet Man"
10. "Pump D Iron"
11. "Harry Krishna"
12. "Vendors"
13. "Daddy Axe"
14. "We Like It" - (featuring Lord Nelson)
15. "Rag Singers (Interlude)"
16. "Lonely Rag"
17. "Mad Bull Body" - (featuring Breeze)
18. "Hard Working Dog"
19. "Toro Toro (Remix)" - (featuring Shaggy)
