= Mighty Sparrow =

Grenadian calypso musician (1935–2026)

Mighty Sparrow ORTT CM OBE OCC
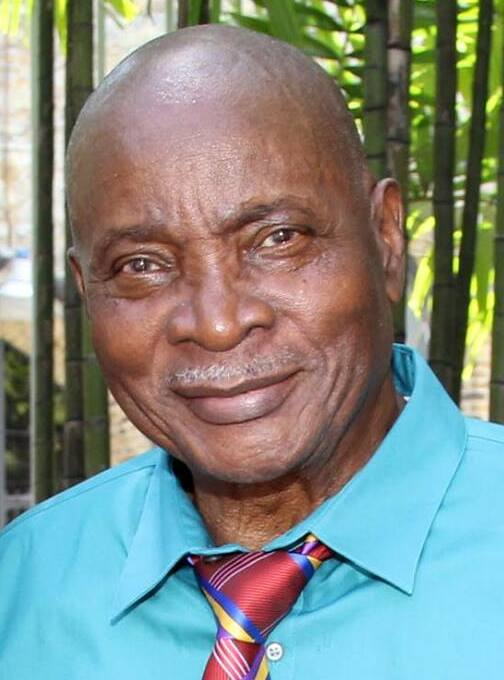
- Sparrow in 2015

Background information
- Born: Slinger Francisco; 9 July 1935; Grand Roy, Saint John Parish, Grenada, British West Indies
- Died: 27 September 2026 (aged 91) New York City, US
- Genres: Calypso; soca
- Occupations: Musician; producer; Calypsonian; songwriter
- Instrument: Vocals
- Years active: 1949–2026
- Labels: Balisier; RCA; National; Recording Artists; Warner; Charlie's; B's; Ice
- Website: Official website

Slinger Francisco ORTT CM OBE OCC (9 July 1935 – 27 September 2026), better known as The Mighty Sparrow, was a Trinidadian calypso vocalist, songwriter and guitarist. Known as the "Calypso King of the World", he was one of the best-known and most successful calypsonians. Francisco won Trinidad's Carnival Road March competition eight times, Calypso King/Monarch eight times, and twice won the Calypso King of Kings title.

== Early life and career ==
Slinger Francisco was born in the fishing village of Grand Roy, Grenada, British West Indies, on 9 July 1935. He moved to the Colony of Trinidad and Tobago as a one-year-old with his mother, his father later relocating there in 1937. He grew up in Laventille, a suburb of Port of Spain. He began singing as a small child, but his love of calypso was discouraged while at Newtown Boys Catholic School, where he sang in the choir. At the age of 14, he joined a steel band comprising neighbourhood boys, and performed with the band at Carnival.

He received his performing name "Little Sparrow" during his early career, as a result of his energetic stage performances:

Your calypso name is given to you by your peers, based on your style. In the old days they tried to emulate British royalty. There was Lord Kitchener, Lord Nelson, Duke. When I started singing, the bands were still using acoustic instruments and the singers would stand flat footed, making a point or accusing someone in the crowd with the pointing of a finger, but mostly they stood motionless. When I sing, I get excited and move around, much like James Brown, and this was new to them. The older singers said "Why don't you just sing instead of moving around like a little sparrow?" It was said as a joke, but the name stuck.

— Mighty Sparrow

After a couple of years, he changed his stage name to "Mighty Sparrow". On leaving school, he began working for the government Control Board, but continued to perform calypso, which became the better paid of the two, and his residency at the Lotus Club made him a star locally.

=== Calypso King ===
His first performance as a carnival singer came in 1954, with "The Parrot and the Monkey". In 1955, Sparrow made his first recordings – "Missing Baby (Ruby)", "High Cost of Living" and "Race Track" for Vitadisc – which were included on the Royalties of Calypso Kingdom compilation a few years later. In 1955 and 1956, he also recorded "Give The Youngsters A Chance", "Family Size Coke", "Goaty", "Clara Honey Bunch" and "Yankee's Back Again" for GEMS, "Jean And Dinah" and "The Queen's Canary" for Kay, and "Sailor Man" for Veejay Special Ace.

In 1956, Sparrow won Trinidad's Carnival Road March and Calypso King competitions with his most famous song, "Jean and Dinah" (also known as "Yankees Gone", a song celebrating the departure of U.S. troops from Trinidad). A live performance of "Yankees Gone" was included on the album Jump Up Carnival in Trinidad. His prize for winning the Calypso King title was $40. In protest at the small sum (the winner of the Carnival Queen beauty contest won $7,500), he wrote the song "Carnival Boycott" and attempted to organize other singers to boycott the competition. About half of the singers followed, including Lord Melody. Sparrow claimed credit for succeeding improvements in the conditions of calypso and steelband musicians in Trinidad, as well as the formation of the Carnival Development Committee, a musicians' assistance organization. Sparrow refused to officially participate in the competition for the next three years, but he continued to perform unofficially, even winning another Road March title in 1958 with "P.A.Y.E." He did perform at the 1957 carnival in the Young Brigade Calypso Tent, where the four songs he performed were recorded and later released on the album Calypso Kings and Pink Gin.

Sparrow went on to have local hits in 1956 and 1957 with singles such as "Jack Palance", "No Doctor No", and "Sailor Man", before beginning a musical slanging match with Lord Melody, wherein each released singles attacking the other. The rivalry went on for several years. In 1957, Sparrow recorded his first album, Calypso Carnival 58, released the following year on the Balisier label.

He again boycotted the carnival in 1959, choosing instead to tour extensively, and early that year released the album Sparrow in Hi Fi before signing a deal with RCA, for whom he recorded eleven albums between 1960 and 1964.

=== Taking calypso abroad ===
Calypso music enjoyed a brief period of popularity in other parts in the world during the 1950s. Trinidadian expatriate Lord Kitchener had helped popularize calypso in the United Kingdom, and Sparrow also found some success there. In the United States, interest in calypso was sparked largely by Harry Belafonte's 1956 album Calypso, the first LP to sell more than one million copies. In January 1958, Sparrow, along with longtime rival Lord Melody, travelled to New York City seeking access to the U.S. music audience. Sparrow had already been recording with Balisier and Cook Records, and with Belafonte's help he also began to record for RCA Victor. He did not achieve the success he had hoped for; he said in a 2001 interview: "When nothing happened for me, I went back to England and continued on with my career."

In 1960, Sparrow returned to the Calypso Monarch competition, winning his second Kingship and third Road March title with "Ten to One Is Murder" (an autobiographical song about an incident in which Sparrow allegedly shot a man) and "Mae Mae". He also began recording for his own label, National Recording. He won the Road March title in 1961 with "Royal Jail" and won his third Calypso King title in 1962 with "Model Nation" and "Sparrow Come Back Home". He won further titles in the 1960s and 1970s and continued to enjoy great popularity in Trinidad. He recorded prolifically, with forty of his albums released during the 1960s and 1970s. In the latter half of the 1960s his recordings began to be released in the United Kingdom.

In 1968, he recorded the album Sparrow Meets the Dragon with Byron Lee in Jamaica. Their version of "Only a Fool Breaks His Own Heart" (written by Norman Bergen and Shelly Coburn) gave them an international hit in 1969, earning a gold disc upon its re-release in late 1977, igniting a No. 2 hit record in 1978 in the Netherlands.

Sparrow had his greatest success internationally in the 1970s, starting with the album The Best Of, featuring live recordings in Brooklyn, New York of Sparrow favourites. In 1974, with Van Dyke Parks as producer, he recorded the album Hot and Sweet for Warner Bros. in Miami, and the following year reunited with Byron Lee for the Sparrow Dragon Again album. He had a big hit in 1977 with "Crawford", a tribute to sprinter Hasley Crawford, and that year embarked on a tour of West Africa, during which he was given the honorary Yoruba title Chief Omo Wale of Ikoyi. In 1978, he recorded the album Only a Fool in London for Trojan Records.

He recognised the advantages of using New York as a base for recording and international touring, and by the mid-1960s moved his operation and family to Jamaica, Queens. He became a fixture in Brooklyn's Labor Day Carnival, regularly appearing at the big Dimanche Gras show at the Brooklyn Museum. He wrote a number of calypsos about life in New York, bookended by his 1969 classic "Mas in Brooklyn" and his provocative 1991 "Crown Heights Justice".

=== Soca ===
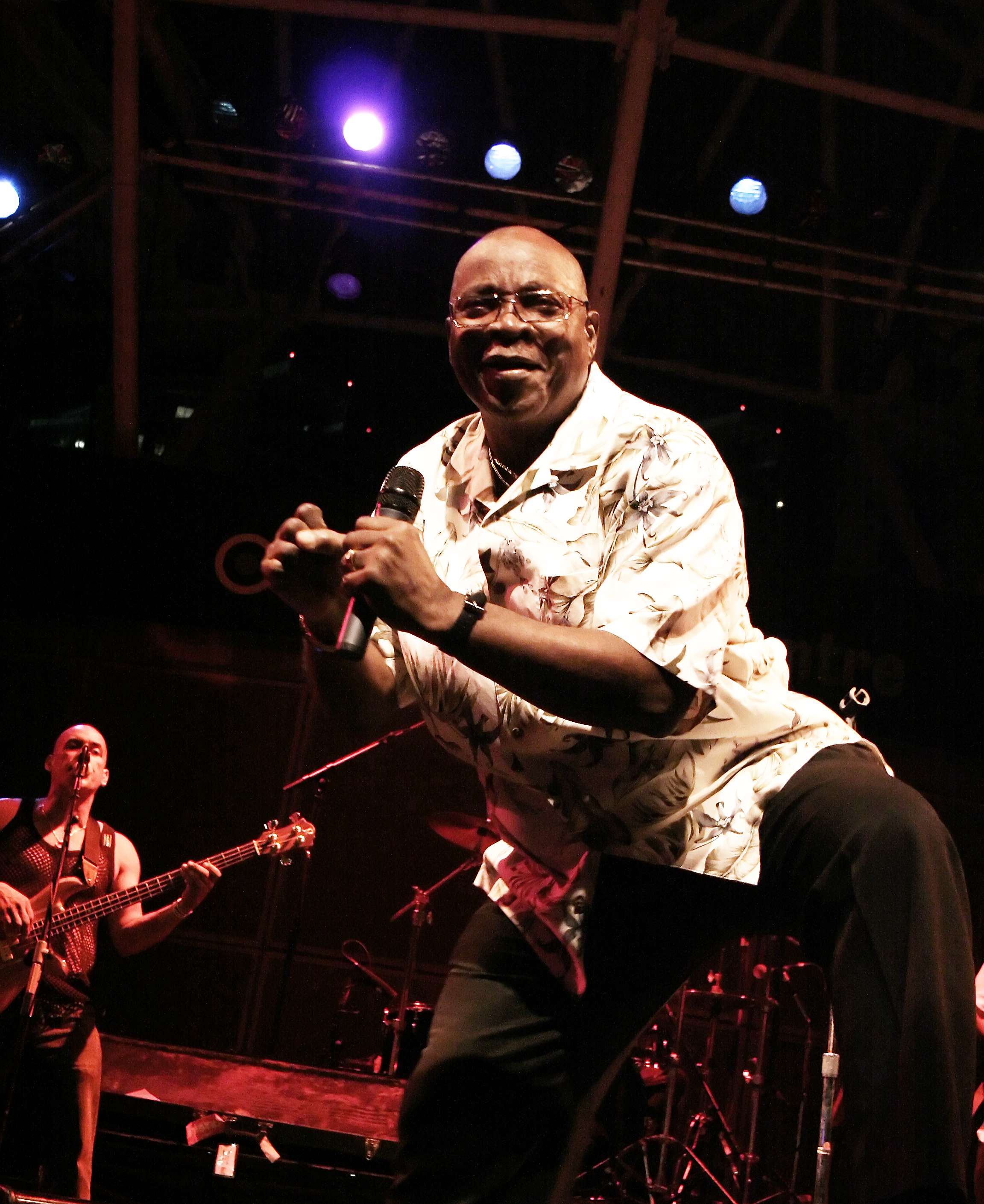
Sparrow performing at Harbourfront Centre (2006)

As soca began to supplant calypso in popularity in Trinidad and Tobago during the late 1970s and early 1980s, Sparrow embraced the hybrid of calypso and soul fused with the local chutney music. In 1984 he won his eighth Road March title with the soca-influenced "Doh Back Back". Also around this time, he began to spend at least half the year in New York City, finding an apartment in the West Indian neighbourhoods in Jamaica, Queens. In 1985, he performed at the carnival's King of Kings show alongside The Mighty Swallow, Blue Boy, Scrunter, Blakie, Mighty Duke, and Black Stalin, taking the "King of Kings" title and the US$10,000 first prize. He would later win the title for a second time. His last major title came in 1992, with "Both of Them" and "Survival" winning him the Calypso Monarch title. He made an appearance at the Reggae Sunsplash festival in 1993. Although less active since the mid-1990s, Sparrow continued to perform, and tour into the 21st century; in a 2001 interview, he mentioned that he had been singing and performing a "Gospel-lypso" hybrid. In 2008, he released a song supporting Barack Obama's presidential campaign, "Barack the Magnificent". He also did a remake of his "Congo Man" song with fellow Trinidadian Machel Montano on the 2008 Flame On album.

In 2010, Sparrow left the stage in a wheelchair after a performance in Trinidad, and later that year was hospitalised after suffering an inguinal hernia while performing in Maryland. He made a full recovery and continued to tour internationally. He was hospitalised several times with complications of diabetes. In September 2013, he was due to receive a lifetime achievement award from the Trinidad and Tobago consulate in New York, but was admitted to a New York hospital, where he fell into a coma for two weeks before regaining consciousness.

Sparrow returned to public performance in January 2014, with a 40-minute set at a bar in Brooklyn, New York. At the end of the year, he was voted "Express Individual of the Year 2014" by the Trinidad Express.

In 2020, he released Live at 85!, a recording from December 2019 of a show at Joe's Pub in New York City.

== Lyrics ==
Sparrow's lyrics are famous for being witty, ironic, and ribald. He sang flirtatiously of the attractions of Hispanic women in "Margarita", and of East Indian women in "Marajhin". He told some outrageously frank tales of sexuality in "Mae Mae", "The Lizard" and "Big Bamboo", and there is humorous commentary on West Indian culture to be found in "Obeah Wedding" and "Witch Doctor". Robert Christgau called his controversial song "Congo Man" "a wildly perverse piss-take on African roots, interracial revenge, interracial sex, male-female relations, and cannibalism". The 1965 song was criticized for its attitudes toward women and Africans, and banned from radio airplay until 1989.

He also frequently commented on social and political issues in his songs. During his early career he was a supporter of Eric Williams and his People's National Movement (PNM), which formed in 1955 and led Trinidad and Tobago to independence in 1962; songs such as "Leave The Damn Doctor Alone" and "William the Conqueror" mentioned Williams directly, while others such as "Federation" (blaming Jamaica for the breakup of the short-lived West Indies Federation), "Our Model Nation" (celebrating Trinidadian independence), and "PAYE" (supporting the PNM's pay-as-you-earn tax system) echoed PNM positions. Sparrow did express discontent in 1957's "No, Doctor, No", but it was comparatively mild, and aimed at holding PNM politicians to their promises rather than replacing them. Sparrow cleverly combined political criticism with sexual innuendo in his mid-1960s song "BG Plantain", which decried the ban levied by PM Williams on imported plantain from British Guiana (BG); plantain, a large banana-shaped vegetable, is a staple of West Indian cuisine, and Sparrow praised the BG plantain as larger, sweeter, and superior to the home-grown Trinidadian variety.

One of his most famous hits, "Dead or Alive" (1979), which achieved international acclaim, addressed the tyranny of rulers such as Idi Amin, the Shah of Iran and other leaders of the era.

His tongue-in-cheek humour is best expressed by his 1970 hit "Sparrow Dead", addressing the premature rumours of his death, which persisted until his actual death in 2026. The lyrics of the song include:

"I hear he have cancer
I hear he have yellow fever
Something in the bladder
And a double dose of leukemia!"

Two gossip mongers gossipin'
I stand in a corner listenin'
Before I could ask who dey talkin' about
A newspaper boy started to shout
"Extra! Read all about it! Paper!"
"Who killed the Sparrow – nobody know . . . "

Well big mouth Lillian
Say de funeral was on television
She picky head cousin say that the coffin cost twenty thousand
This is why he sell de company
To pay de doctor and de burial fee!"

In later years, Sparrow continued to incorporate social issues into his music. "Crown Heights Justice" is a plea for peace and understanding in the wake of the 1991 Crown Heights Riot in Sparrow's adopted home of New York City. The themes of peace, tolerance, and concern for the poor show up repeatedly in songs such as "Human Rights" (1981), "Capitalism Gone Mad" (1983), and "This Is Madness" (1995).

== Later years and death ==
Sparrow survived a coma in 2013 but was left with reduced mobility, which limited his performances in the years that followed. In 2014, he said: "I can deal with it, but I prefer to just take it a little slower." In his later appearances he performed in a motorised wheelchair. Hopes that he would return to the stage to mark his 90th birthday in July 2025 were not realised, and he did not appear at the 2026 Trinidad and Tobago Carnival.

Sparrow died at a hospital in Queens, New York, on 27 September 2026, at the age of 91.

== Discography ==
- Calypso Carnival 58 (1958), Balisier
- This Is Sparrow (1958), Balisier
- Sparrow in Hi Fi (1959), Balisier
- King Sparrow's Calypso Carnival (1959), Cook
- Sparrow (1960), RCA
- The Mighty Sparrow (1960), RCA
- Sparrow's Greatest Hits (1960), RCA
- More Sparrow's Greatest Hits (1960), RCA
- Sparrow Calypso King (1960), RCA
- Sparrow the Conqueror (1961), RCA
- The Calypso King of Trinidad (1961), RCA
- Sparrow Come Back (1962), RCA
- Calypso Sparrow (1963), RCA
- The Slave (1963), RCA
- Sparrow Sings Songs for Lovers (1964), RCA
- The Outcast (1964), National
- Christmas with Sparrow (1964), National
- Congo Man (1965), National
- "Dan Is The Man" (1965), Wirl Records, Jamaica 7"
- "Harry And Mama" (1965), Wirl Records, Jamaica 7"
- Sparrow's Calypso (1965), National
- Tattooed Lady (1966), National
- The Calypso Genius (1966), National
- Spicy Sparrow (1967), Recording Artists
- Sparrow Calypso Carnival (1968), Recording Artists
- Sparrow Meets the Dragon (1968), Spalee – aka Only a Fool – Mighty Sparrow & Byron Lee
- "Jughead" (1969) Tiger, Jamaica 7" (DYNA 868)
- More Sparrow More (1969), Recording Artists
- Bang Bang Lulu in New York (1969), Recording Artists
- Calypso Time (1970), Recording Artists
- Calypso a la King (1971), Hilary
- Sparrow Power (1971), Recording Artists
- Moods of Sparrow (1972), Bestway
- Hotter Than Ever (1972), Recording Artists
- Sparrow Spectacular (1973), WIRL
- Knock Dem Down (1973), Recording Artists
- Hot and Sweet (1974), Warner Bros. – produced by Van Dyke Parks and Andy Wickham
- Calypso Maestro (1974), Recording Artists
- Sparrow Dragon Again (1975), Spalee – Mighty Sparrow & Byron Lee
- "How You Jamming So" (1976), Tysott, Jamaica 7" (SP 1002 DSR 4048-A-DT)
- Sparrow vs the Rest (1976), Tysott
- "Witch Doctor" (1976) Tysott, Jamaica 7" (SP 1002 DSR 4048-B-DT)
- Boogie Beat 77 (1977), Semp
- Sparrow NYC Blackout (1977), Charlie's
- Only a Fool (1978), Trojan
- Pussycat Party (1978), SH
- London Bridge (1979), JAF
- Latin Black (1980), Sparrow
- Sparrow Sanford (1981), Charlies
- Sweeter Than Ever (1982), Charlies
- The Greatest (1983), Charlies
- Vanessa (1984), B's
- King of the World (1984), B's
- A Touch of Class (1986), B's
- One Love One Heart (1987)
- Dr Bird (1988)
- Hot Like Fire (1992), Ice
- Dancing Shoes (1994), Ice
- The Supreme Serenader (1998), AR
- Barack De Magnificent (2008), BLS/VP
- Fyaah and Fury (2018), BLS/VP

Live albums

- Sparrow at the Sheraton Kingston (1963), National
- Sparrow at the Hilton (1967), Recording Artists
- Live Volume Two (1971), Hilary
- The Best of (1971), Strakers – recorded live in Brooklyn
- Live at 85! (2020)

Major compilations

- Mighty Sparrow Volume 1 (1992), Ice
- Mighty Sparrow Volume 2 (1993), Ice
- Mighty Sparrow Volume 3 (1993), Ice
- Mighty Sparrow Volume 4 (1994), Ice
- The Millennium Series (2000–2001), Mika Enterprises – a series of 40 albums compiling Sparrow's recordings

Compilation appearances

- Calypso Kings and Pink Gin (Cook Records, 1957)
- Calypso Exposed (Cook, 1961)
- 16 Carnival Hits (with Lord Kitchener) – 1992
- Calypso Awakening from the Emory Cook Collection (Smithsonian Folkways, 2000)
- First Flight: Early Calypsos from the Emory Cook Collection (Smithsonian Folkways, 2005)
- Calypsoes (Trinidad, August 1959)

== Major awards and honours ==
- 1969 – Hummingbird Medal Silver
- 1993 – Chaconia Medal Gold
- 1987 – Honorary Doctor of Letters (D. Litt.) from the University of the West Indies
- 2001 – Order of the Caribbean Community from Caricom
- 2013 – Lifetime Achievement Award from the Consulate General of the Republic of Trinidad and Tobago in New York
- 2014 – Order of the Republic of Trinidad and Tobago
- 2015 Birthday Honours – Officer of the Most Excellent Order of the British Empire (OBE)

=== Carnival Road March titles ===
Year	Song
1956	"Yankees Gone"
1958	"P.A.Y.E."
1960	"Mae Mae"
1961	"Royal Jail"
1966	"Melda (Obeah Wedding)"
1969	"Sa Sa Ay"
1972	"Drunk And Disorderly"
1984	"Doh Back Back"

=== Calypso King/Monarch titles ===
Year	Song 1	Song 2
1956	"Yankees Gone"	none
1960	"Ten to One Is Murder"	"Mae Mae"
1962	"Sparrow Come Back Home"	"Federation"
1963	"Dan Is the Man (In the Van)"	"Kennedy"
1972	"Drunk and Disorderly"	"Rope"
1973	"School Days"	"Same Time, Same Place"
1974	"We Pass That Stage"	"Miss Mary"
1992	"Both of Them"	"Survival"
