= Album 34 =

Studio album by Machel Montano
- Released: 9 March 2010
- Recorded: 2009, 2010
- Genre: Soca
- Length: 55:21
- Label: VP Records
- Producer: Machel Montano

Machel Montano chronology
Heavenly Drum (2009)	Album 34 (2010)	The Return (2011)

Album 34 is an album released by popular Soca artist Machel Montano from Trinidad and Tobago in 2010.

== Track listing ==
1. "Bumper to Fender"
2. "Alright (Ramajay)"
3. "Hot Like" – (featuring Serani)
4. "Thiefin"
5. "Doh Hold Meh Back"
6. "No Behaviour"
7. "Slow Wine"
8. "Really Hot" – (featuring Wildfire)
9. "Wooeeii Gyal Wooeeii" - (featuring Busy Signal)
10. "Tell Me"
11. "Fetting On" – (featuring Skinny Fabulous)
12. "Doh Hold Meh Back (Remix)"
13. "No Behaviour (Road Mix)"
14. "Not Going Home"
15. "Wooeeii Gyal Wooeeii" (Tegareg Speed Remix)
