= Lord Nelson (calypsonian) =

Trinbagonian calypsonian (1960–present)

- Also known as: Nello, Papa Nelo
- Born: Robert Alphonso Nelson; 27 July 1931; Plymouth, Trinidad and Tobago
- Genres: Calypso; Soca
- Occupation: Calypsonian
- Years active: 1962 - 2022
- Label: Diverse

Lord Nelson, born Robert Nelson, is one of the acknowledged stars of soca.

== Background and music career ==
Born and raised in Plymouth, Tobago, Nelson went to the United States after graduating from high school, hoping for a better life in Brooklyn. However, he was soon drafted and sent off with the U.S. forces to Korea, which was where he first showed his talents as a singer and comedian, performing in Army shows. He patterned himself after calypsonians such as the Mighty Sparrow, Lord Melody, and Lord Kitchener, especially Sparrow, and sang calypso and ballads for his fellow troops.

Back in America, he began singing with West Indian steel bands in Brooklyn, covering calypso hits in his original fashion, much appreciated by the Caribbean community. He started writing his own material under the mentorship of another calypsonian, Mighty Duke and was heralded as the Calypso King of New York in the 1960’s

Nelson's personal style derived from calypso, but also from the American music he heard every day, adding some funk to his Caribbean hits like "La La Jam Back" and "King Liar". While he was not the first to make soca music, he found a great deal of popularity, and won the title of Uncrowned King in a competition for off-island artists at Trinidad's annual Carnival in 1989, Nelson has said the average person did not know that he was instrumental in inventing what would be known as soca along with Ras Shorty I and Maestro. He often mentions his deep hurt at not initially being accepted in calypso circles, due to the fact that he was born in Tobago. Nelson has documented that dark moment in his musical history in the 1978 calypso "Foreigner".

In 1990, he signed with Shanachie, which ensured good distribution for his music and was then able to go global with his sound. His label debut, "When the World Turns Around", offered a digital remake of his earlier album "Love You Forever", which had originally appeared on the Joker label. He is recognized as a soca pioneer making the music known in places like Sweden, Germany Norway, England and Latin America.

His legacy consists of more than a party song composer and singer, but also a calypsonian who covered humorous topics, and included social commentary—on subjects such as racism, colonialism, politics, inequality, cultural identity and corruption—in his songs. Nelson, as a resident abroad, had both the opportunity to spread the soca and calypso message beyond the boundary of the islands, as well as performing in Trinidad and Tobago, in the calypso tents. He has also performed at prestigious venues and events around the world, such as Madison Square Garden, Carnegie Hall, and the Smithsonian Institution.

He is widely regarded as a pioneer and a legend of soca music, and has influenced many younger artists in the genre. Indeed, Nelson not only built a career in music for himself, but also helped others to start their musical careers. He is credited with giving nine-year-old Machel Montano an opening slot to perform at his show in Paris, singing “Too Young to Soca”.

Nelson continues to record and perform. On July 30, 2022 (age 91) he performed at the Friends of Lord Nelson tribute concert at Queen's Hall, St Ann's (Trinidad). He attributes his health to his diet of seafood, but not eel as it resembled a snake. He says his hobby is fishing, he likes to go out there and try his best to see if he can outsmart the fish below the water.

He is known for wearing one of his jumpsuits when performing on stage, and loves to be referred to as ‘Disco Daddy’ from one of his tunes.

== Merits ==
- Lord Nelson was presented with a Lifetime Achievement Award for his devotion and commitment to Trinidad and Tobago and soca music - spanning 60 plus years and ongoing - on February 20, 2019.
- Lord Nelson was granted an Honorary Doctorate of Letters (DLitt) from the University of the West Indies for his contributions to culture and calypso, on October 29, 2022.

== Family ==
Lord Nelson is the uncle of another young soca/rapso artist, Mojah.

== Discography ==
=== Albums ===
- “A Proud West Indian” (1963), N.L.P. 4189
- ”Garrot Bounce” - “Whoopsin” (1964), N.R.C. 01-1
- ”Again” (1973), Camille 9028
- ”This is Lord Nelson” (1973), Camille 9022
- ”Mr. Kaiso” (1975), Camille 9033
- ’Then and Now” (1975), Camille 9039
- ”Hot, Sweet and Jumpy” (1977), Richie’s Music
- ”Ah, Ha” (1977), Charlie’s Records
- ”Black Gold” (1978), Charlie’s Records
- ”Disco Daddy” (1980), Charlie’s Records
- ”Pepper” (1981), Romey’s Records, Charlie’s Records
- ”Family” - ”All of We is One Family” (1981), B’s Records
- ”We Like it” (1982), B’s Records
- ”Hotter than Hot” (1983), B’s Records
- ”The Chief Breakin’ for 85’” (1985), M.R.S. Records
- ”Gimme Something” (1986), Charlie’s Records
- ”Love you Forever” (1988), Joker Records
- ”Yesterday, Today and Forever” (1989)
- ”When the World Turns Around” (1990), Shanachie
- ”Bring Back the Voodoo” (1991), Shanachie
- ”Greatest Hitz” (1999), Charlie’s Records

=== Singles, EPs & Digital ===
- ”Michele” (1962)
- “Save the Federation” / “Dove and Pigeon” (1962) - Cab Records
- “Stella” / “Party For Santa Claus” (1963) - N.R.C
- “The Itch” / “Problems on my Mind” (1963) - N.R.C
- “Nelo Drunk Again” / “Bedtime Stories” (1964) - N.R.C.
- “Freedom” (1965) - N.R.C.
- “Save the Federation” / “Dove and Pigeon” (1965) - Cab 101 (With Milo and the Kings)
- ”Play Mask” / “Nelson Know” (1965) - Cab 106 (With Milo and the Kings)
- ”The Itch” / “Proud West Indian” (1965) - Cab 107
- ”Calamity” / “Twilight Zone” (1966) - Camille 108
- ”Don't Let The Party End” / “Human Convertibles” (1966) - National N.S.P. 089
- ”No More White Christmas” / “Merry Christmas To One and All” (1966) - National N.S.P. 090
- ”Neighbour” / “Sugar” (1966) - National N.S.P. 100
- ”Doo Doo Darling” / “He And She” (1966) - National N.S.P. 101
- ”Neighbour” / “Sugar” (1966) - National N.S.P. 101
- ”Don't Ever Say (It's All Over)” / “When He Lets You Down” (1966) - National N.S.P. 107
- ”The Army” / “Nelsonia” (1967) - Camille 111
- ”Garrot Bounce '67 Part 1” / “Garrot Bounce '67 Part 2” (1967) - Camille 113
- ”Pressure” (1967) - Camille Records
- ”Nelo's Calamity” / “Dingo-lay” (1967) - National N.S.P. 189
- ”Poo Poo” / “Peter” (1967) - Camille Records
- ”Moonlight Shining Bright” / “Till Foreday Morning” (1967) - Camille Records
- ”Michael” / “No Hot Summer” (1968) - Camille Records
- ”(Leh We) Carry On” / “Vero” (1972) - 45, Camille 129
- ”A Party for Santa Claus” / “Merry Christmas to One and All” (1973) - Camille 136
- ”Saving That for Company” (1973)
- ”Since You Gone” / “Grandma & Grandpa” (1974) - Camille 137
- ”Moonlight Shining Bright” / “Till Foreday Morning” (1974) - Camille 141
- ”Poo Poo” / “Peter” (1974) - Camille 151
- ”Immigration” / “Old Youth” (1975) - Camille 154
- ”Pressure” / “Stella” (1975) - Camille 158
- ”Miss Falsie” (1976) - Straker’s GS 222
- “La La Jam Back” - “La la” (1976) - Straker’s GS 223
- ”King Liar” (1977) - Richie’s Music
- ”Ah, Ha” / “Boat Ride” - “The Boat” (1977) - Richie’s Music
- ”Metric System” (1978)
- ”The Scroll” (1978)
- ”Foreigner” (1978)
- ”Calistra’s Donkey”/”Norman and Audrey” (1979), RCA PB5205
- ”Siamese Twins” (1980)
- ”Ah Going and Party Tonight” - “Party Tonight” (1981)
- ”Family” (1981)
- ”When de Time Come” (1981)
- ”Jenny” (1981)
- ”Meh Lover” (1982)
- ”Darling” (1984)
- ”Sweet Carnival” (1984)
- ”Feelings” (1984)
- ”Soca in the Street” (1987)
- ”Party Time” (1989) - Shanachie
- ”Love you Forever” (1990) - Totem Records
- ”Bald Head Rasta” (2009)
- ”Shango” (2012) - Soundway
- ”Do We Ting” (2022) - With Kes, G.M.B.

=== Compilations ===
- ”The Best of Nelson” (1998), Nelson Records
