= Book of Angels (Machel Montano album) =

The Book of Angels

Studio album by Machel Montano
- Released: (Trinidad and Tobago) 27 February 2007 (United States) 25 March 2007
- Recorded: 2006, 2007
- Genre: Soca
- Length: 55:40
- Label: Ruf Rex Records Ltd
- Producer: Machel Montano

Machel Montano chronology
| B.O.D.Y. (2006) | The Book of Angels (2007) | Flame On/Winning Season (2008) |

The Book of Angels is an album released by popular Soca artist Machel Montano from Trinidad and Tobago in 2007. The album marked Machel Montano's 25th year in the Music industry and was his first album under a Machel Montano HD re–branding. The album was launched at Trinidad's Club Zen on 27 February 2007 and reportedly sold out within days of its release. The album was relaunched in New York City on 25 March 2007 for the North American market.

The song Jumbie on the album won Trinidad's 2007 Road March Competition for Trinidad and Tobago Carnival.

The album features several solo tracks as well as collaborations with several popular artists: Jamaicans Sizzla & Vybz Kartel, American M.O.P., Trinidadians Patrice Roberts & Nadia Madoo and Japan's Minmi.

== Track listing ==
1. "Higher Than High"
2. "Jumbie"
3. "Light It Up" – (featuring Patrice Roberts)
4. "One More Time"
5. "Hold You Tonight" – (featuring Vybz Kartel)
6. "Like Bollywood (Together)" – (featuring Nadia Madoo)
7. "Higher Than High (Kettle Drum Mix)"
8. "Mud"
9. "Down D Road"
10. "Sha Na Na / Japanese Wine" – (featuring Minmi)
11. "Higher Than High (Remix)" – (featuring Sizzla)
12. "One More Time (1 Series Remix)" – (featuring M.O.P.)
