= Grand Roy =

- Village
- Grand Roy
- Location within Grenada
- Coordinates: 12°07′56″N 61°44′45″W
- Country: Grenada
- Parish: Saint John
- Elevation: 89 ft (27 m)

Population
  - Total: 2,400
- Time zone: UTC-4

Grand Roy is a town in Grenada. It is located on the island's west coast, in the Parish of St. John, to the north of Marigot on the road to Gouyave.

== Born in Grand Roy ==
- Mighty Sparrow (1935)
