= Patrice Roberts =

Trinidadian soca singer (born 1986)

- Roberts in 2009

Background information
- Born: April 1986 (age 40)
- Origin: Toco, Sangre Grande, Trinidad and Tobago
- Genre: Soca
- Occupations: Musician, Song-writer
- Instrument: Vocals
- Years active: 1994–present
- Website: http://www.instagram.com/patriceroberts1

Patrice Roberts (born April 1986) is a Trinidadian soca singer. She began singing and winning calypso and soca competitions as a child. Her first hit was "The Islands", a collaboration with her cousin Bunji Garlin. In 2006, she became the first female member of Machel Mantano's soca band, Xtatic, later winning Carnival Road March for the song "Band of D Year". She is one of the most streamed female soca artists. Between 2023 and 2025, she won Female Soca Artist of the Year at the annual Caribbean Music Awards.

== Early life ==
Patrice Roberts was born in April 1986. She grew up in the rural village of Toco, Trinidad, where she attended Toco Composite Secondary School. She started singing when she was 7 years old and was mentored by calypso singer and composer Beulah Bobb. Bunji Garlin is her second cousin.

== Music career ==
When she was 9, Roberts won the 1995 Sangre Grande Junior Calypso Monarch competition. In the year 2001, she became the National Soca Monarch, the National Library Calypso Monarch and the National Junior Calypso Monarch. She again won the National Junior Calypso Monarch in 2002.

She came to national attention in 2005 with the hit collaboration "The Islands" alongside Bunji Garlin, written by Kernal Roberts and produced by Shawn Noel (Da Mastermind). The song was used in promotional commercials by the Ministry of Tourism. It features a theme of pan-Caribbean identity.

In 2006, she became the first female member of Xtatic (later known as HD), a soca group headed by Machel Mantano. Together Mantano and Roberts won the 2006 Road March competition for their song "Band of D Year". At the time she was the youngest female artist to win this award.

"A Little Wine", her 2013 Carnival hit song, includes the lyrics: "Everybody wine on somebody now, a little wine never hurt nobody..." It was first released for the 2012 Barbados Crop Over festival. Trinidad Express Newspapers criticized it as unoriginal. That year Roberts performed on her Love Music tour, including stops in the Caribbean, Europe, and North America.

During the Covid-19 pandemic, Carnival celebrations were cancelled. Roberts performed virtually and continued to release music. "Tender", which has afrobeat influences, was named as one of 100 Best Songs of 2020 by NPR.

"Mind My Business", a collaboration with Travis World and Dan Evens, was released in 2022 while Carnival remained suspended. The song, which includes the lyrics: "I go drink water and mind my business", was described by NPR as a "long-toted internet mantra... set to joyous gyration". The song is one of her biggest hits, accruing more than 7 million views on YouTube and winning soca video of the year at the Caribbean Music Awards. Rozonda Thomas, Michelle Williams, and Karlie Redd posted videos with the song on social media.

Roberts was featured on Nicki Minaj's 2022 "Fine Nine" remix of the dancehall song "Likkle Miss" by Skeng.

As of 2023, Roberts is the most streamed female soca artist. Between 2023 and 2025, she won Female Soca Artist of the Year at the annual Caribbean Music Awards.

=== Style ===
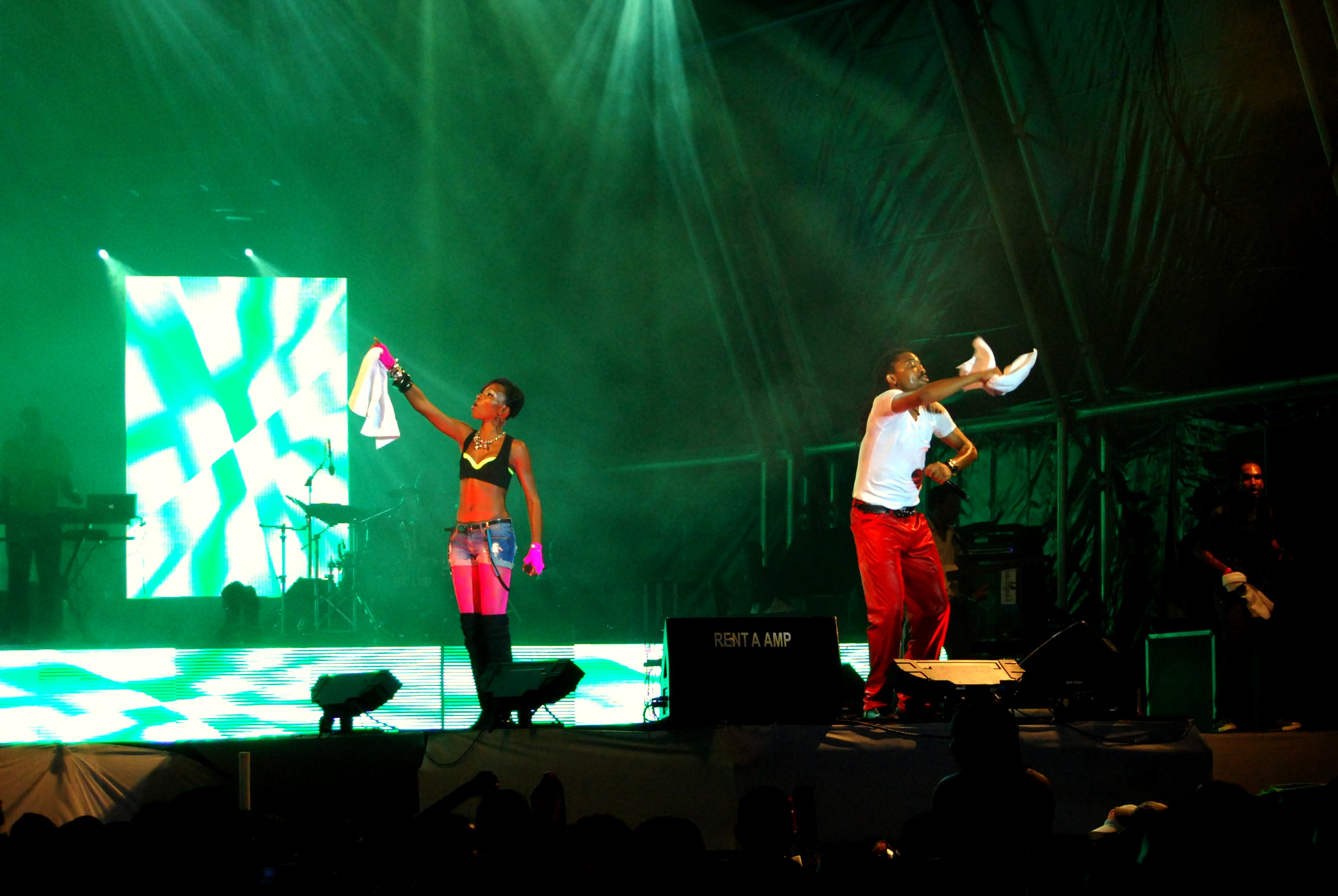
Patrice Roberts (left) and Machel Montano (right) perform at UWI Splash in Chaguaramas, Trinidad in 2009.

Roberts has been described as part of a feminist movement in soca music that challenges gender and morality norms and celebrates female sexuality. In the song "Looking Hot", she "imparts a specific script that encompasses strength, control, and liberation". Her music also has themes of "collective joy and healing". Additionally, her music has been described as demonstrating creolization, "mixing what we monolithically term American, African, European, Asian cultural styles into specific complex wholes".

== Personal life ==
Roberts has one child with fellow soca artist Ricardo Drue. They collaborated on the song "Toxic Love" in 2021. He proposed during a live performance in his home country of Antigua and Barbuda in 2022, and they planned to marry in 2024. Drue died in December 2023 at age 38 after he was found unresponsive. Roberts posted a photo of Drue on Instagram with the caption: "I’d do anything to hear your voice...wake up!" At a 2024 concert, she briefly spoke to a hologram of Drue.

Roberts is interested in fashion and has spoken about getting plastic surgery.

In April 2026, her former management company won a lawsuit against her for breach of contract.

=== Charted singles ===
List of charted singles, showing year released, chart positions and album name
Title	Year	Peak chart position	Album
Title	Year	SUR	Album
"Trouble"	2026	27	Non-album single

== Awards and nominations ==
Year	Awards	Category	Work	Result	Ref.
2006	Carnival Road March		"Band of the Year" (with Machel Montano)	Won	
2023	Caribbean Music Awards	Female Soca Artist of the Year	—N/a	Won	
2023	Caribbean Music Awards	Soca video of the year	"Mind My Business"	Won	
2024	Caribbean Music Awards	Female Soca Artist of the Year	—N/a	Won	
2025	Caribbean Music Awards	Female Soca Artist of the Year	—N/a	Won	

== Discography ==
- Blossoming (2003)
- Looking Hot (2008)
