= Differentology (album) =

Studio album by Bunji Garlin
- Released: August 12, 2014
- Genre: Soca
- Length: 48:40
- Label: RCA/VP Records
- Producers: Edwin Howell, Ian Alvarez, Chris Chin (Exec.)

Differentology is an album by soca singer Bunji Garlin released in 2014 by RCA/VP Records. The album peaked at No. 6 on the US Billboard Reggae Albums chart.

== Critical reception ==
Professional ratings
Review scores
Source	Rating
AllMusic	4/5 stars
Rolling Stone	3/5 stars

Julianne Escovedo Shepherd of Rolling Stone gave Differentology a 3 out of 5 stars rating. Shepherd took note that Garlin "blends dancehall, EDM and even trap ("Truck on D Road," with ASAP Ferg) into his sound, without ever seeming like he's trying too hard. It's soca for the Spotify generation."

Jon Caramanica of The New York Times praised Differentology saying "Decades ago, reggae made peace with dancehall, its younger, rowdier, more digital version, but soca — reggae’s Caribbean cousin — has been slower to modernize. That’s one of a few reasons that “Differentology” (VP/RCA), the new Bunji Garlin album, feels like such a shock to the system. This is the album that assuredly moves soca into the now era."

David Jeffries of AllMusic remarked "singer Bunji Garlin offers a much more rough and energetic take on the (Soca) genre. Having collaborated with Busta Rhymes and been remixed by Major Lazer, his 2014 effort Differentology retains some of these pop influences with hip-hop beats and EDM production techniques scattered about...He sees dance music as freedom and works James Brown-hard at delivering this message, while his combination of charisma and supreme leader stylings comes straight out of Paisley Park, even if Bunji is a much more gruff character than Prince. Filled with the tracks that made him Trinidad's Soca Monarch, plus a favorite among those who those who like to see the boundaries of pop music pushed, Differentology is a fine intro to this dynamic and vital artist.

Chris Richards of The Washington Post exclaimed "The Trinidadian vocalist might be the shiniest star in soca music, but his new album throbs with a rich, pulsating pan-Caribbean energy that should translate easily on any dance floor."

Natalie Weiner of NPR commented "Differentology is the soca singer's 11th album, and that after 16 years in the business, Garlin is finally poised for crossover success...the album's first line is its mission statement: "Somebody give me a riddim to activate the waistline on the feminine gender, now please," Bunji intones. Thankfully, someone complied."

Differentology was placed upon Rolling Stone's list of the 20 Best EDM, Electronic and Dance albums of 2014.

== Track listing ==
No.	Title	Writer(s)	Length
1.	"Red Light District"	Ian Alvarez, Darien Bailey, Kevin Marshall	04:08
2.	"Carnival Tabanca"	Ian Alvarez, Keron Thompson	03:47
3.	"Savage"	Ian Alvarez, Keron Thompson	03:15
4.	"Differentology (Ready for the Road)"	Ian Alvare, Keron Thompson	04:19
5.	"Truck on D Road [Remix]"	Ian Alvare, Darold Ferguson, Paul "Jester" Jones	03:48
6.	"West Indian Jungle"	Ian Alvare, Jason Farmer	04:11
7.	"Touchless"	Ian Alvare, Klase Gonzales	03:38
8.	"Differentology (Ready for the Road) [Major Lazer Remix]"	Ian Alvar, Thomas Wesley Pent, Keron Thompson	05:00
9.	"Carnival Tabanca [Viking Remix]"	Ian Alvare, Paul "Jester" Jones	04:30
10.	"All O'Dem"	Ian Alvarez, Dwain Antrobus	03:21
11.	"Stages"	Ian Alvarez, Keston Patrick	03:01
12.	"Over the Hills"	Ian Alvarez, Keron Thompson	03:32
13.	"Gi Dem Dey"	Ian Alvare, Klase Gonzales	02:10
