= Any Minute Now (Machel Montano album) =

Studio album by Xtatik
- Released: February 9, 1999
- Recorded: 1998, 1999
- Genre: Soca
- Label: VP Records
- Producer: Machel Montano

Xtatik chronology
Charge (1998)	Any Minute Now (1999)	Here Comes the Band (2000)

Any Minute Now is an album by Trinidadian Soca artist Machel Montano and his band Xtatik released in 1999.

The album features guest appearances from Beenie Man on "Outa Space", Burning Flames on "Showdown (Band Meet Band)", and Red Rat on "Rubber Waist".

A promotional video for "Outa Space" was made featuring Montano and Beenie Man as 'Men in Black' in search of two female aliens.

== Critical reception ==
Professional ratings
Review scores
Source	Rating
AllMusic	3.5/5 stars

With a 3.5 out of 5 stars rating, Rosalind Cummings-Yeates of AllMusic praised the album saying "Montano's innovation is in abundant display on Any Minute Now...Although the dancehall overtones are slightly tedious at times, this album definitely qualifies as a soca standout."

== Track listing ==
1. "Close Encounter (Interlude)"
2. "Outa Space (UFOs)" - (featuring Beenie Man)
3. "Big Phat Fish"
4. "We Sound (Ba Dang)"
5. "Soca"
6. "With Or Without You" - (featuring Walker Hornung)
7. "Mocking Meh"
8. "February"
9. "Rubber Waist" - (featuring Red Rat)
10. "Powder Puff"
11. "Size"
12. "Lo Riders"
13. "Showdown (Band Meet Band)" - (featuring Burning Flames)
14. "Quicksand"
15. "Any Minute Now"
