= Travis World =

Trinidadian DJ and dance music producer

Travis Hosein, known professionally as Travis World, is a Trinidadian DJ and dance music producer, who works in soca and related genres of music from the Caribbean. He has produced tracks featuring many prominent Caribbean artists, including Superblue, Machel Montano, Lyrikal, Nessa Preppy, Konshens and Skinny Fabulous.

== Career ==
From an early age, his talents were noticed by his mother Betty Ann, who encouraged him to hone his DJ skills at school, and family events. At the age of 15, he began his career as a radio DJ at Slam 100.5FM, becoming one of the youngest DJs in the country. He began producing music at the age of 16, and aspires to following the career paths of Major Lazer and DJ Khaled in taking Caribbean music to a global audience. In 2018, he produced the hit single "Soca Kingdom" by Superblue and Machel Montano, which won the 2018 Road March during Trinidad and Tobago Carnival, and propelled him to national fame. With the cancellation of the 2020 Carnival due to the COVID-19 pandemic, his output slowed down considerably, although he did participate in a virtual Battle of the Hits against Saint Lucian producer Motto that May.
