= Jean and Dinah =

Calypso from Trinidad and Tobago

"Jean and Dinah" (When The Yankees Gon) is a calypso from Trinidad and Tobago in the Caribbean sung by calypsonian Mighty Sparrow that became an international hit in 1956. It was also his first of eight roadmarches. This calypso, Sparrow's first hit, commented on the large-scale prostitution that the bases once supported and the desperation of these prostitutes following the closure of many American military bases in Trinidad in the post-war period.

Jean and Dinah, Rosita and Clementina
Round de corner posin'
Bet your life is something dey sellin'
But when you catch them broken [="broke"] you could get dem all for nuttin'
Doh make a row
De Yankee gone, and Sparrow take over now!

American movie star Robert Mitchum also recorded the song and released it on his 1957 hit album Calypso… is like so.
