= Bunji Garlin =

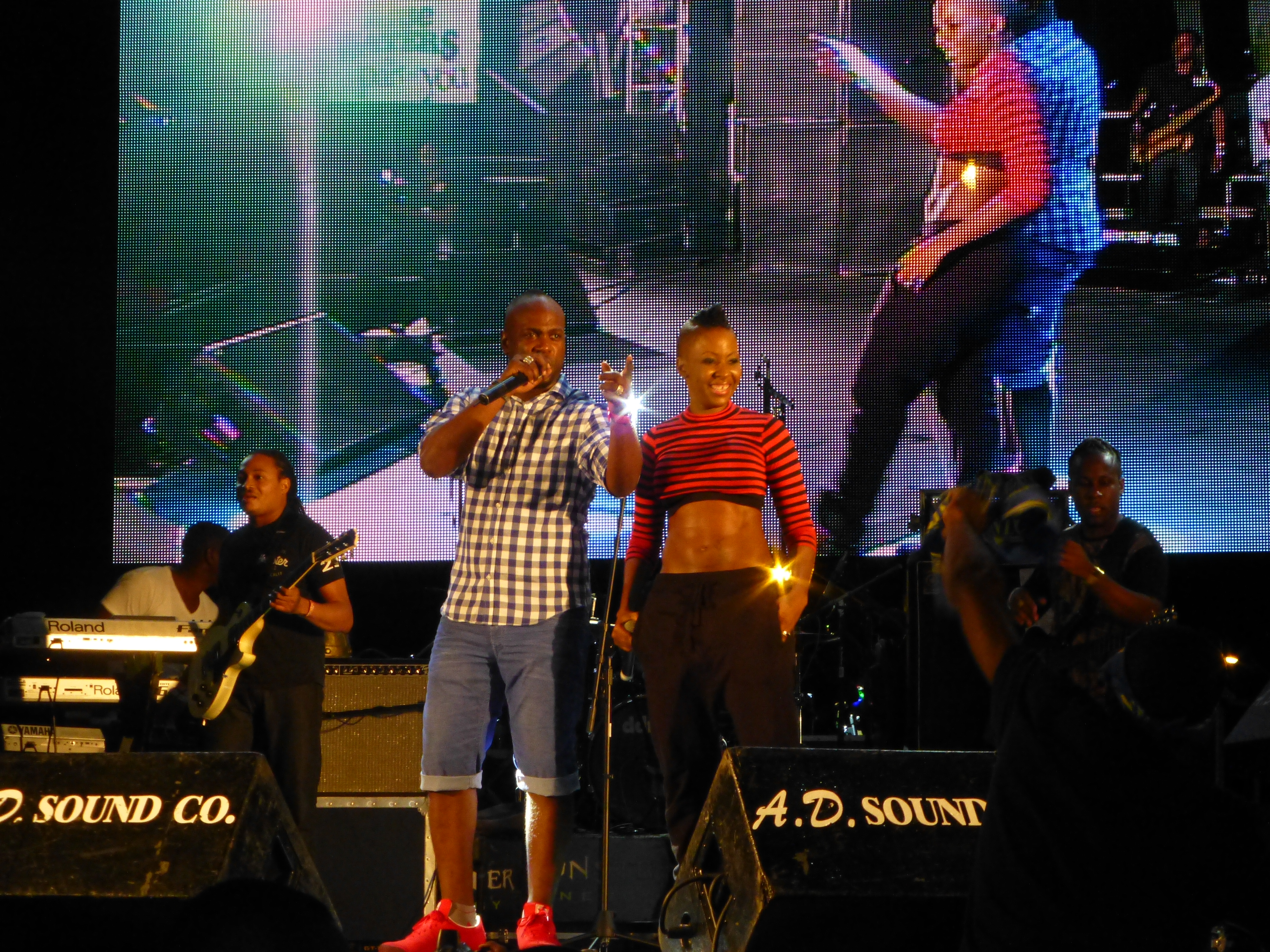
- Bunji Garlin and Fay-Ann Lyons 2014

Background information
- Born: Ian Antonio Alvarez; July 14, 1978 (age 47); Arima, Trinidad
- Genres: Reggae, soca, dancehall
- Occupations: Musician, producer, songwriter
- Instrument: Vocals
- Years active: 1999–present
- Labels: VP, RCA
- Spouse: Fay-Ann Lyons-Alvarez (married 2006)

Ian Antonio Alvarez (born July 14, 1978), better known by his stage name Bunji Garlin, is a Trinidadian ragga and soca artist. He is also affectionately known as the Viking of Soca. His spouse is Fay-Ann Lyons.

== Early life ==
Bunji was born on July 14, 1978, in Arima, Trinidad. He is of Saint Lucian and Venezuelan descent.

== Personal life ==
He married fellow soca artist Fay-Ann Lyons on December 23, 2006, daughter of successful soca singer Superblue. He is also a second cousin of singer Patrice Roberts, who performs alongside the popular Machel Montano.

== Career ==
Bunji has won Trinidad's Soca Monarch/International Soca Monarch competition on several occasions: 2002 (tied with Iwer George) with "Down in the Ghetto", 2004 with "Warrior Cry", 2005 with "Blaze the Fire" (both songs were produced by then band member Shawn Noel (Da Ma$tamind) and 2008 with "Fiery". He placed second in the International Soca Monarch 2009 with "Clear de Road", while his pregnant wife Fay-Ann Lyons placed first with "Meet Super Blue". She also won the Groovy Soca Monarch title that same night with "Heavy T Bumpa".

Bunji Garlin's "Brrt" is featured on the Grand Theft Auto IV soundtrack.

In 2013, Garlin won the Soul Train Award for Best International Performance for the song "Differentology", which features Nigel Rojas on guitar. An album of the same name was released by RCA and VP Records in August 2014.

In 2017, he released Turn Up, his highest chart placing to date, reaching No. 3 on the Billboard Reggae Albums chart. On September 24, 2017, Garlin was bestowed with a national award of T&T, the silver Hummingbird Medal. A song by Garlin entitled "All or Nothing" also appeared in the pilot of the Netflix TV series Impulse.

== Discography ==
=== Albums ===
- The Chronicles (1999)
- Revelation (2002)
- Black Spaniard (2003)
- Graceful Vengeance (2004)
- Flame Storm (2005)
- Next Direction (2006)
- Global (2007)
- Fiery (2008)
- "iSpaniard" (2012)
- The Viking (2013)
- Differentology (2014), VP/RCA - US Reggae no. 6
- Turn Up (2017), VP - US Reggae No. 3
- Ayl'Ian (2024)

=== Singles ===
- "Differentology" (2013)
- "Truck on D Road" (2014) (featuring A$AP Ferg)
- "The Message" (2015) (featuring Damian Marley)
- "Television" (2016)

=== Collaborations ===
- "Carnival Tabanca" (featuring Tarrus Riley) 2014
- "Coofy Lie Lie" (featuring Singing Sandra) (2002)
- "Let's Get It On" and "That Woman" (featuring Walker Hornung) (1999, 2001)
- "Rags Don't Care" (featuring Chinese Laundry and Shurwayne Winchester) (2003)
- "Soca Bhangra" (featuring Shami) (2003)
- "Don't Waste Water" (featuring Shurwayne Winchester) (2005)
- "The Islands" (featuring Patrice Roberts) (2005)
- "Lorraine" (featuring Explainer) (2005)
- "Move with Us" (TSTT jingle also featuring Shurwayne Winchester and Machel Montano) (2006)
- "Get Up Stand Up" (featuring T.O.K.) (2007)
- "Hardcore Loving" (featuring Rita Jones) (2007)
- "Swing It" (featuring Chris Black) (2007)
- "One Family" (featuring Freddie McGregor) (2007)
- "Bring It" (featuring Lalchan Babwa (Hunter)) (2008)
- "Country Rum (featuring Neeshan Prabhoo) (2008)
- "Bring It Superstar Mix" (Lalchan Babwa (Hunter) featuring Alison Hinds, Andy Singh, Bunji Garlin & Ziggy Rankin) (2008)
- "That's How We Party" (featuring Busy Signal) (2005)
- "Big Blood" (featuring 3suns and Sir Skarz) [2011]
- "Sex, Love and Reggae" (Gyptian featuring Bunji Garlin and Angela Hunt) (2013)
- "All or Nothing" (Elliphant featuring Diplo and Bunji Garlin)
- "Jungle Bae" (Jack Ü featuring Bunji Garlin) (2015)
- "Baddest Things" (Party Favor & Nymz featuring Bunji Garlin) (2015)
- "Buss Head" (with Machel Montano) (2017)
- "Ride It" (Sebastian Ingrosso & Salvatore Ganacci featuring Bunji Garlin) (2017)
- "Famalay" (with Machel Montano and Skinny Fabulous) (2019)
- "Bomboclat (Light It Up)" (with Dillon Francis, from the EP Magic Is Real) (2019)
- "Break a Branch" (with Motto) (2020)
