= Jan Rot =

Dutch singer-songwriter (1957–2022)

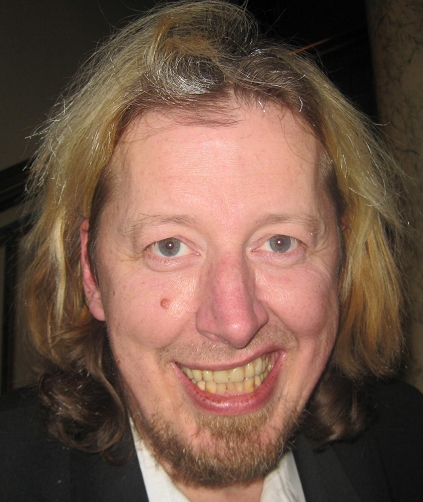

Background information
- Born: 25 December 1957; Makassar, Indonesia
- Died: 22 April 2022 (aged 64) Rotterdam, Netherlands
- Occupations: Singer, composer, songwriter
- Instruments: Guitar, piano
- Years active: 1978–2022
- Website: janrot.nl

Jan Rot (25 December 1957 – 22 April 2022) was a Dutch singer-songwriter born in Makassar, who was famous in the Netherlands for his many translations of songs, pop as well as classical ones. His Dutch translation of Bach's St Matthew Passion peaked in the Dutch pop album charts at Easter 2006. In 2021, Rot was diagnosed with terminal cancer; he continued performing till April 2022 and died in Rotterdam on 22 April.
