= Chinese Laundry =

Historic building in San Diego, California, U.S.

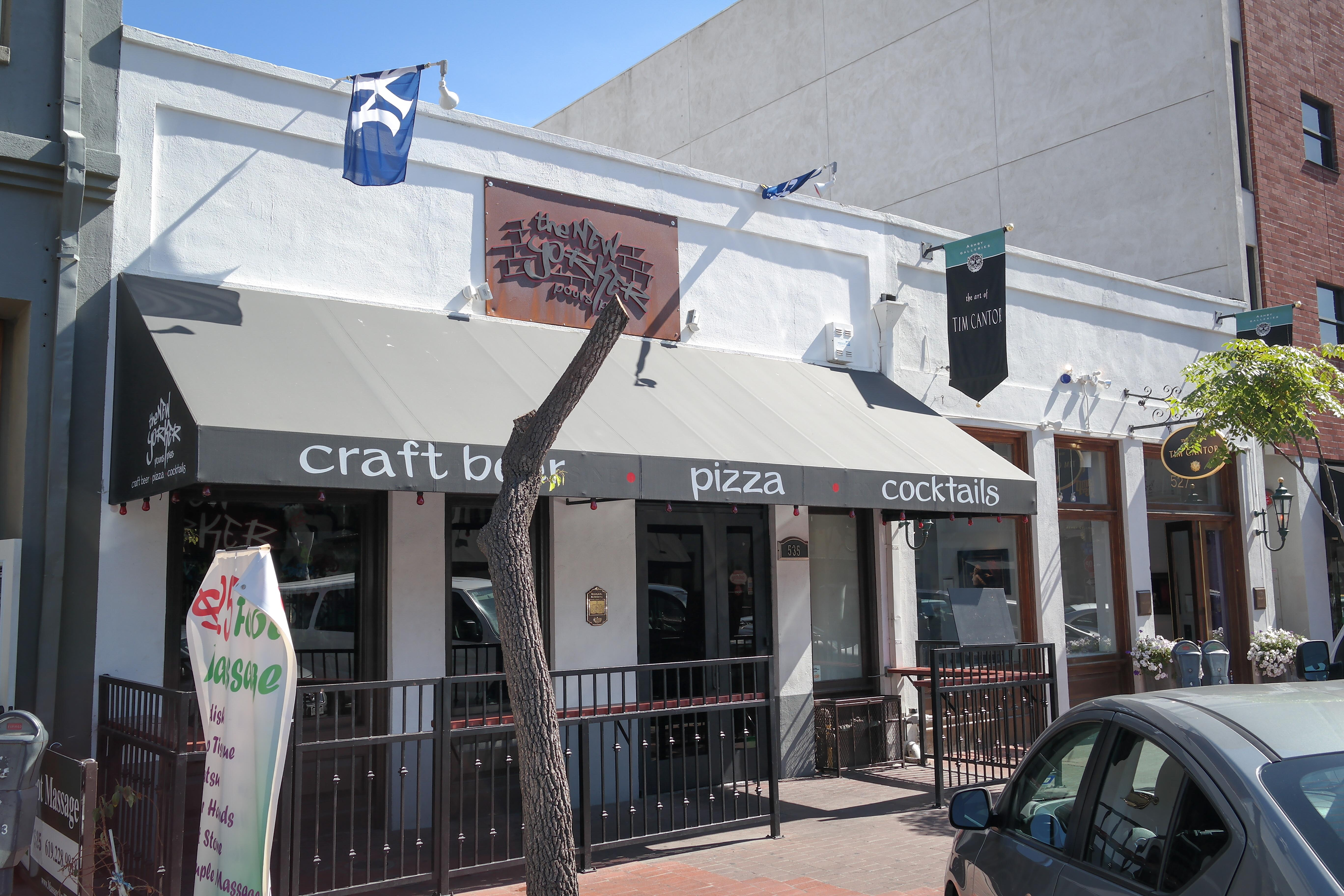
- The building in 2014
- Interactive map of the Chinese Laundry area

General information
- Location: 527 4th Avenue, San Diego, California, United States
- Coordinates: 32°42.65′N 117°9.653′W

The Chinese Laundry building (also called Hop Lee Chong Laundry) is a historic structure at 527 4th Avenue in the Gaslamp Quarter, San Diego, in the U.S. state of California. It was built in 1923.

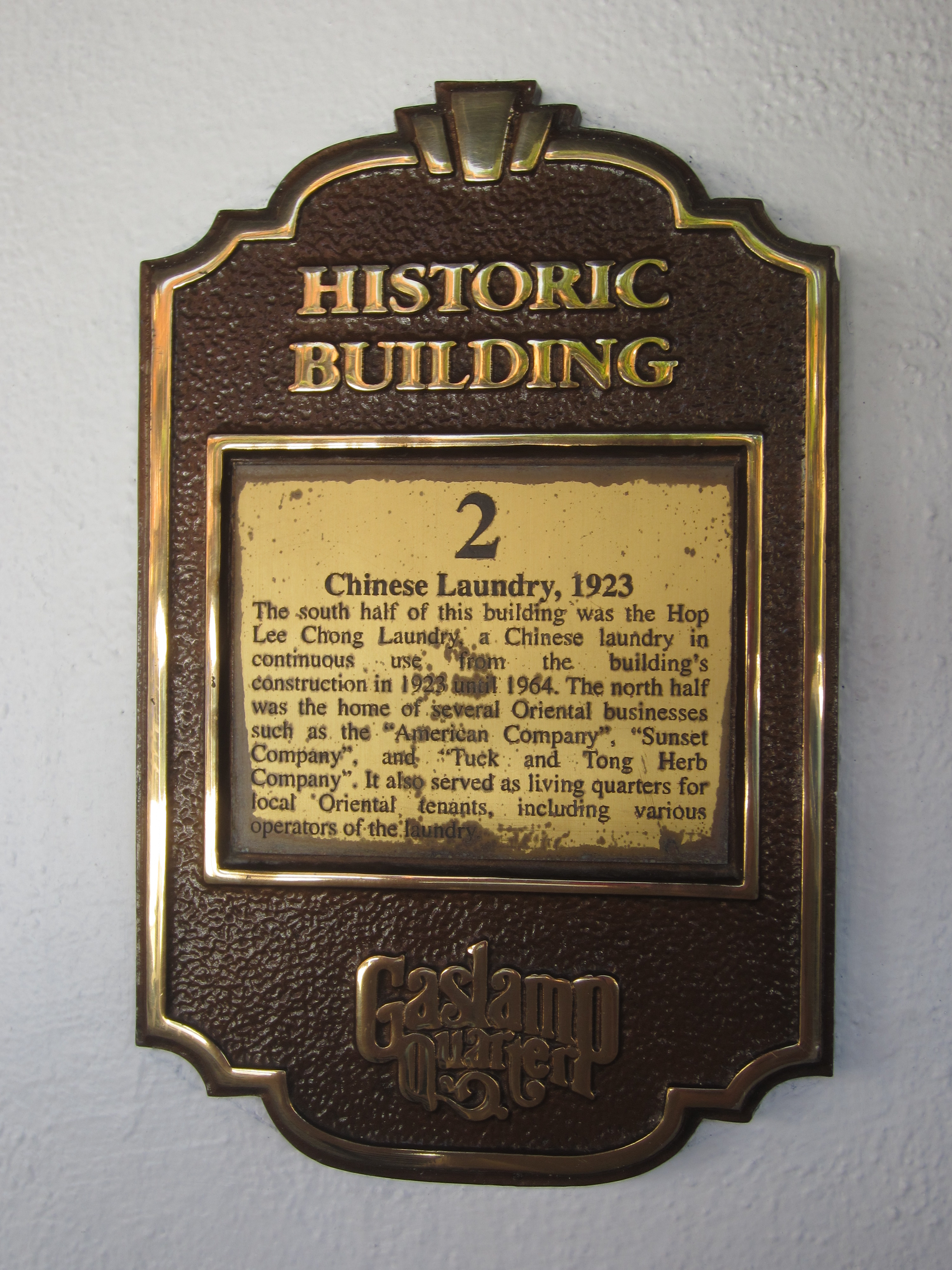
Plaque for the building, 2016

== See also ==
- List of Gaslamp Quarter historic buildings
