= Machel Montano =

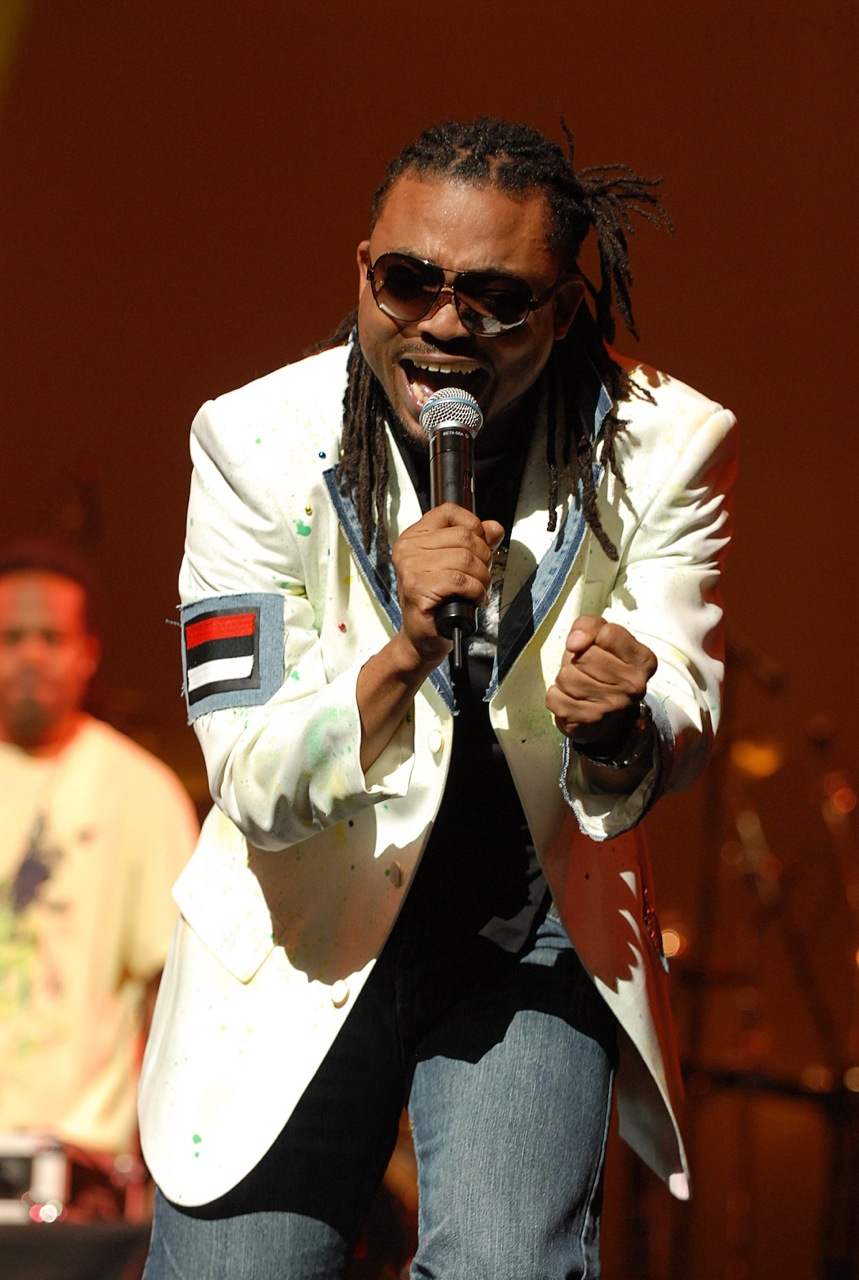
- Machel Montano performing in 2007

Background information
- Born: Machel Montano; 24 November 1974 (age 51); Carenage, Trinidad and Tobago
- Origin: Siparia, Trinidad and Tobago
- Genres: Soca, Calypso
- Occupations: Singer, songwriter, record producer
- Instruments: Vocals, guitar, keyboards, percussion
- Years active: 1982–present
- Label: Monk Music
- Website: www.machelmontano.com

Machel Montano (born 24 November 1974) is a Trinidadian singer, songwriter and record producer. He is widely regarded for globalising and pioneering the soca music genre. Renowned for his high-energy, fast-paced, and often unpredictable performances, Montano is one of Trinidad and Tobago's most popular musicians of all time.

== Early life ==
Montano was born in Carenage (Northwestern Trinidad) on 24 November 1974. His family moved to Siparia (Southwestern Trinidad) when he was very young. He attended Siparia Boys R.C., then Presentation College, San Fernando, where he sang in the school's choir led by Mrs. Cynthia Lee-Mack.

Machel's first shot to fame as a nine-year-old boy came with the song "Too Young To Soca" while he was still in primary school. In 1984, along with his older brother Marcus and neighbours, the group Panasonic Express was started and, in 1989, the band became Xtatik. In April 1986, at the age of 11, Montano appeared on the mainstream television show Star Search. In 1987, he took part in the Trinidad and Tobago National Song Writers Festival, and placed second with his song "Dream Girl". He also won the Caribbean Song Festival in Barbados, becoming the first Trinidadian and youngest contestant to win this competition.

== Musical career ==
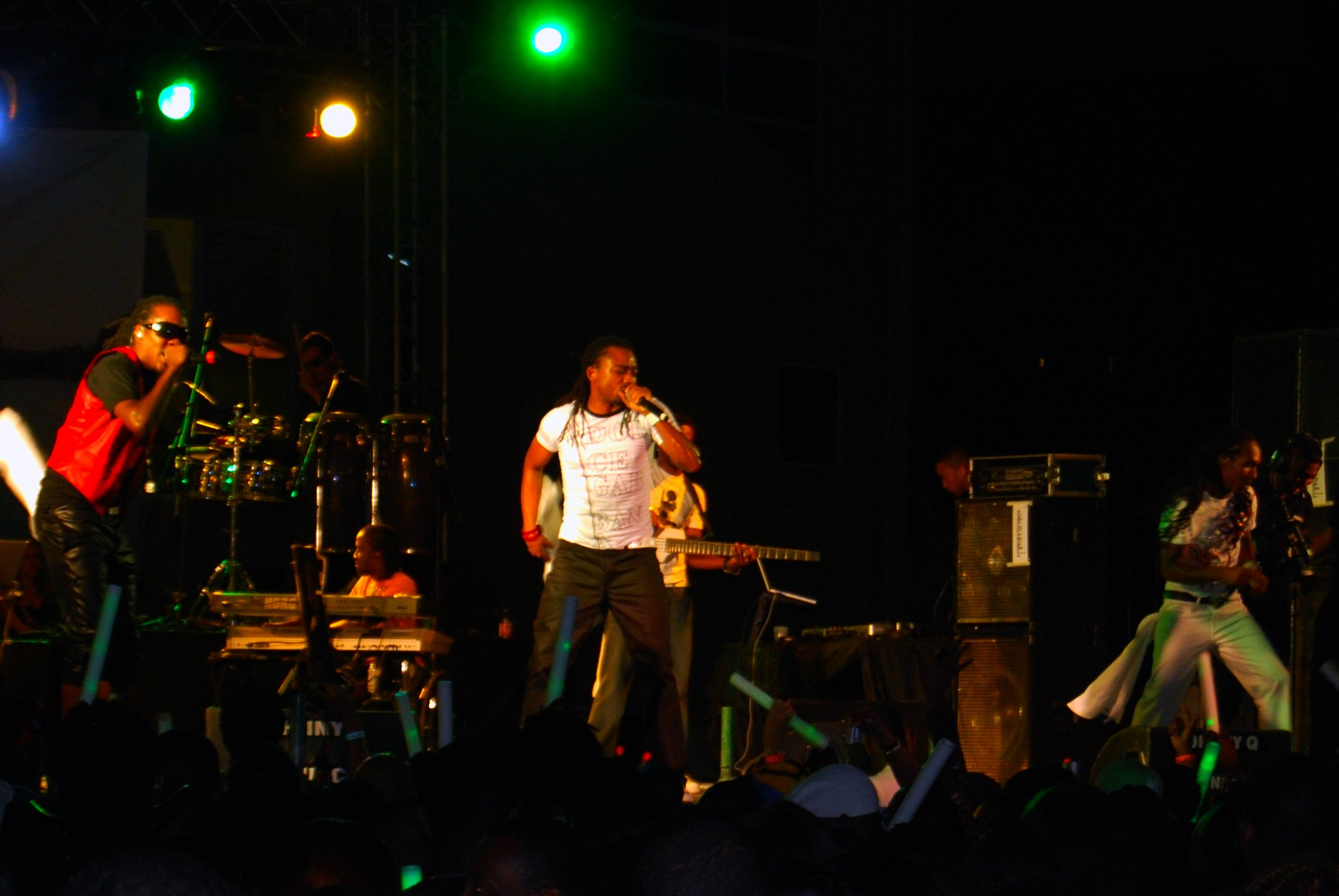
Machel (center) performing on stage alongside Zan (left) and Farmer Nappy (right)

Montano's band was originally entitled the Panasonic Express. The band was later re-invented and retitled as The Xtatik Circus, Xtatik, The Road Marching Band and The Band of the Year. Since 2007, they have been known as Machel Montano HD (High Definition). During the early 2000s, Kernal Roberts, son of the late calypsonian Lord Kitchener, was appointed the band's drummer and musical director.

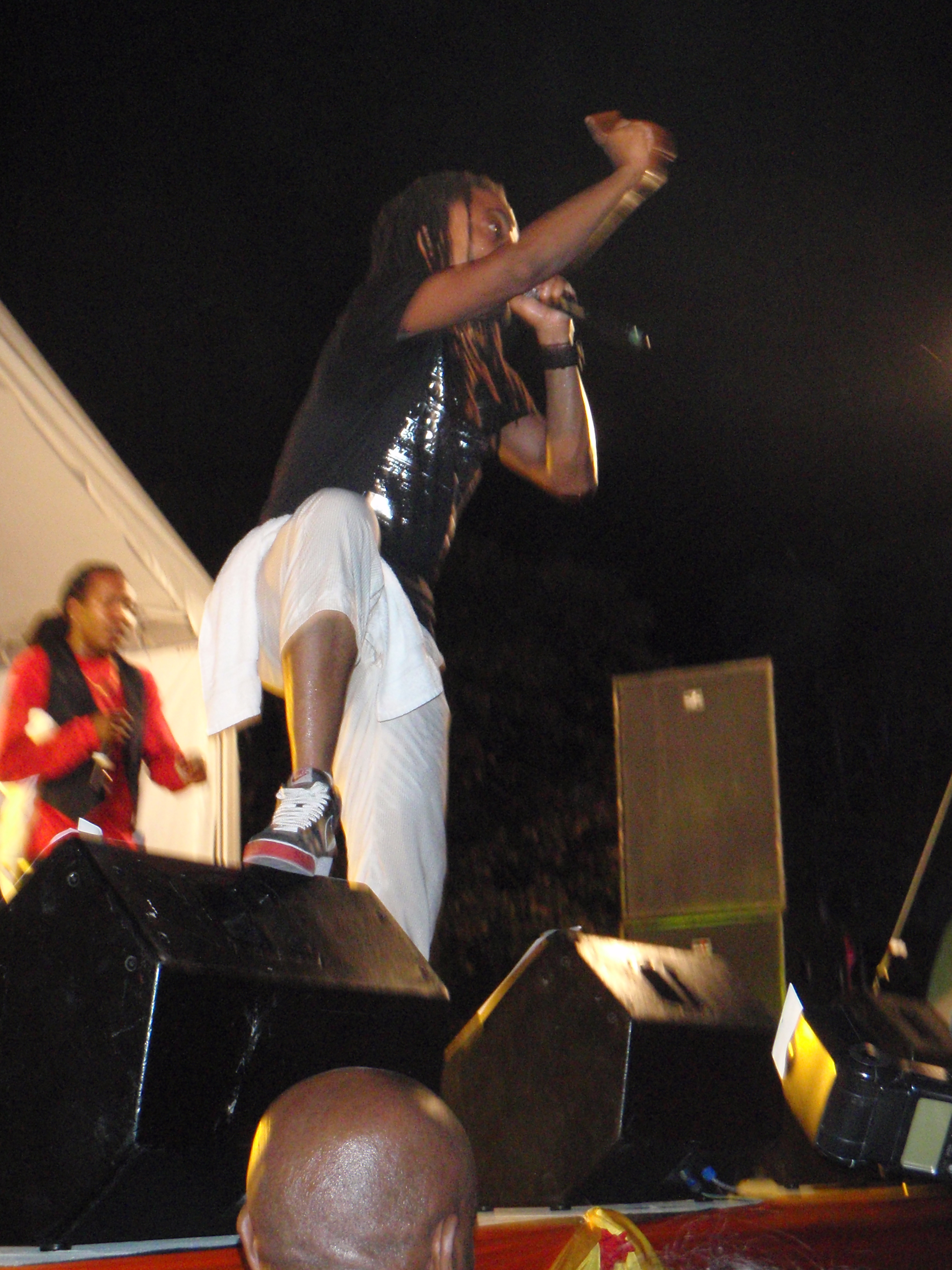
Machel Montano performing at a fete at Brian Lara's house in Barbados (2008)

Montano also co-presented the International Sounds of Soca show on BBC Radio 1Xtra for four years with DJ Slic. His successful singles, with and without Xtatik, include "Big Truck" (Xtatik's most successful single, which won the Road March title in 1997), "Outa Space" (with Beenie Man), "With or Without You", "Runaway" (with Walker Hornung), "Music Farm" (Xtatik), "It's Carnival" (with Destra Garcia), and his Road March title wins in 2006, "Band Of The Year" (with Patrice Roberts), and in 2007, "Jumbie".

1998's Toro Toro featuring Shaggy peaked at No. 19 on the UK Independent Singles chart, and 2015's One Wine featuring Sean Paul and Major Lazer peaked at No. 37 on the US Billboard Dance/Electronic Digital Song Sales chart. Additionally, Mr Fete along with Soca Kingdom featuring Superblue both peaked at No. 22 on the US Billboard World Digital Song Sales chart.

Machel is well known in New York City, where he has had sold-out concerts in Madison Square Garden many times over. He is a six-time International Soca Monarch, a twelve-time Trinidad and Tobago Road March winner, and a one-time Calypso Monarch.

=== Appearances in other media ===
Montano made his movie debut with Bazodee (2016), which was filmed entirely in Trinidad and Tobago. He stars in the movie as a soca singer who falls in love with a businessman's daughter.

In 2017, Montano also released an autobiographical documentary entitled "Machel Montano: Journey of a Soca King".

In the 2026 video game Grand Theft Auto VI, he appears as character Kenton Rees.

== Accolades ==
In November 2014 Montano won a Soul Train Award for Best International Performance for the song "Ministry of Road (M.O.R.)". His win for "Ministry of Road" is the second consecutive win at the BET Soul Train Music Awards for Soca Music just after Bunji Garlin won in 2013 with Differentology.

On November 15, 2018, Montano acquired an honorary doctorate of arts from the University of Trinidad and Tobago. He was later bestowed, in September 2022, with a Hummingbird Gold Medal, a national award of Trinidad and Tobago.

== Personal life ==
Montano holds a Master's degree in Carnival Studies from the University of Trinidad and Tobago.

On February 14, 2020, Montano married his longtime girlfriend Renee Butcher. His wedding ceremony occurred at T&T's' Red House, the nation's parliament building. He is the father of three children, Melanie, Nicholas, and Maya Journey.

== Discography ==
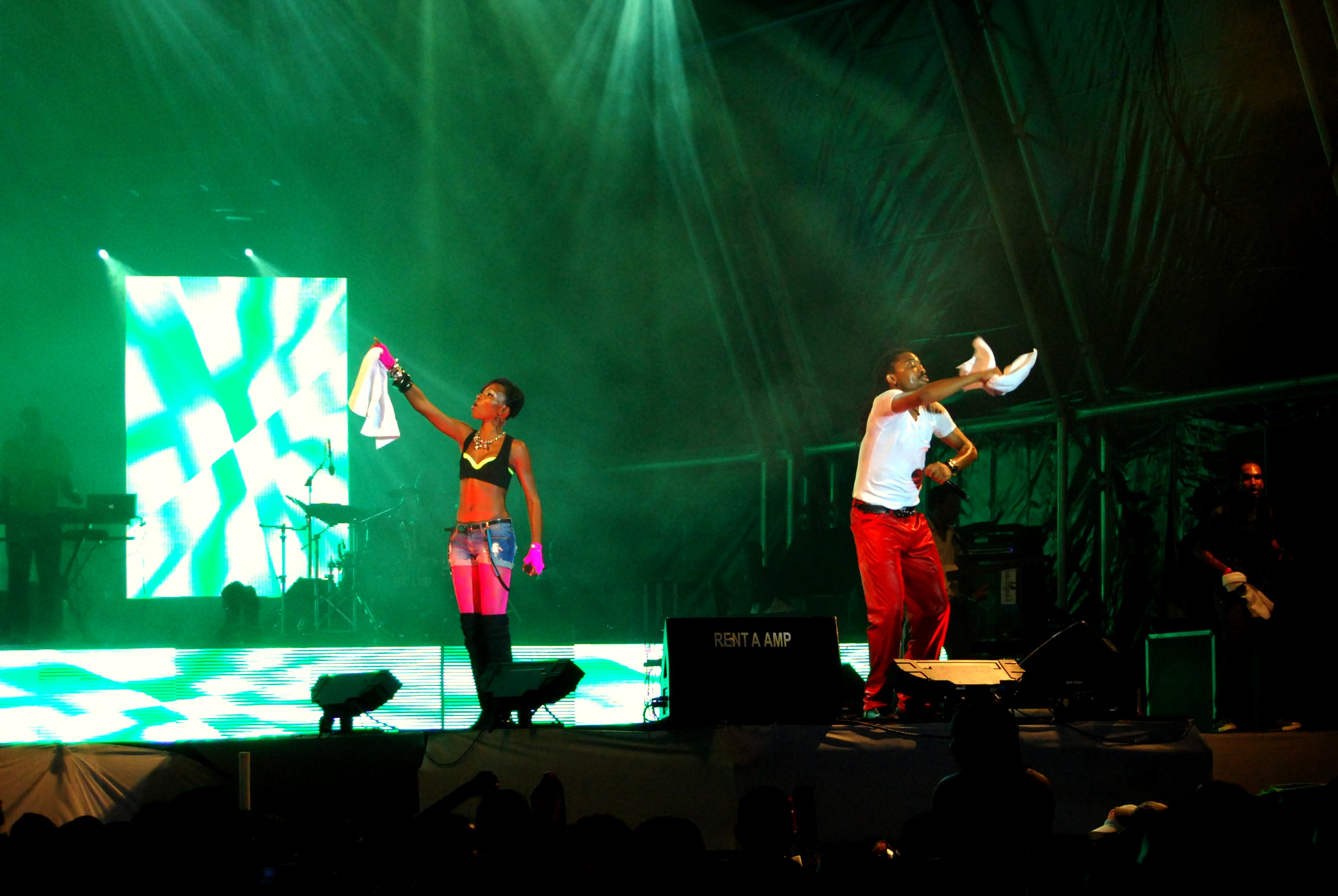
Patrice Roberts (left) and Machel perform at UWI Splash in Chaguaramas, Trinidad.

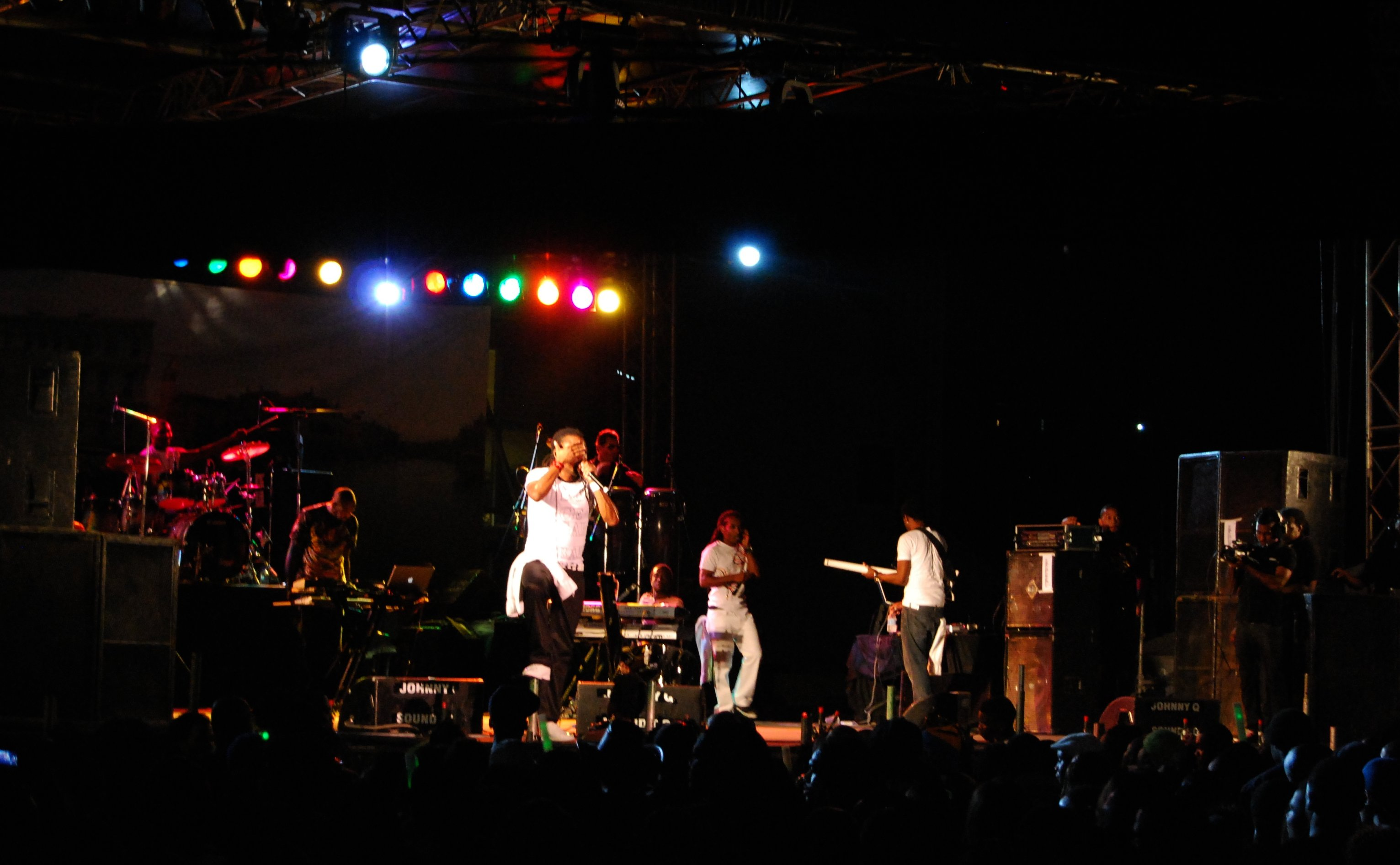
Machel and his band perform in front of a live audience at a fete

=== Solo albums ===
- Too Young to Soca? (1985)
- Soca Earthquake (1987)
- Dr. Carnival (1988)
- Katch Ya! (1989)
- Breakin Out! (1990)
- One Step Ahead! (1991)
- 2000 Young To Soca (2000 Re-Edition)
- The Xtatik Parade (2004)
- The Xtatik Experience (2005)
- B.O.D.Y. - Band Of D Year (2006)
- The Book of Angels (2007)
- Flame On, released as Winning Season in the United States (2008)
- Heavenly Drum (2009)
- Album 34 (2010)
- The Return (2011)
- Double M (2012)
- Going for Gold (2012) - Machel Montano and Friends
- Machelements (Volume 1) (2013)
- Happiest Man Alive (2014)
- Monk Monté (2015)
- Monk Evolution (2016)
- G.O.A.T. (2019)
- The Wedding Album (2021)
- One Degree Hotter (2025)
- Encore (2026)

=== Xtatik albums ===
- X Amount Ah Sweetnesss (1992)
- Soca Style Hot (1993)
- By All Means (EP) (1994)
- Loose Yuh Waist (1995)
- Men at Work (1996)
- Heavy Duty (1997)
- Xtatik Live (1997)
- Charge (1998)
- Any Minute Now (1999)
- Here Comes the Band (2000)
- Same High (2001)
- On the Cusp (2002)
- The Xtatik Circus (2003 – as "Xtatik Band 5.0")

=== Charted singles ===
List of charted singles, showing year released, chart positions and album name
Title	Year	Peak chart position	Album
Title	Year	JAM Air.	Album
"Road Trip"	2015	8	Monk Evolution

=== Guest appearances ===
- "With or Without You" and "Runaway" by Machel Montano with Walker Hornung from Q-South and The Brotherhood of the Grape (1999,2000)
- "Floor On Fire" by Lil' Jon featuring Pitbull and Machel Montano (2009)
- "Alright" by Pitbull featuring Machel Montano (from the album Planet Pit) (2010)
- "Can't Let Go" by Boyz II Men featuring Machel Montano (from the album Collide) (2014)
- "Shake Yuh Bum Bum" by Timaya featuring Machel Montano (2014)
- "All My Love (Remix)" by Major Lazer featuring Ariana Grande and Machel Montano (2015)
- "Taxi (Carnival Remix)" by Pitbull, Lil' Jon and Machel Montano (2016)
- "Carnaval (T&T Remix)" by Claudia Leitte featuring Pitbull and Machel Montano (2018)
- "Issa Vibe/Pick Your Position" by Motto featuring Skinny Fabulous and Machel Montano (2019)
- "Young Boy" by Calypso Rose featuring Machel Montano (2019)
- "Gud Gud" by Hey Choppi featuring Machel Montano (2021)
- "Soil Song" by Sounds of Isha featuring Machel Montano, Arjuna Harjai, Marge Blackman, and Sandeep Narayan (2022)
- "Come Awake" by Sounds of Isha featuring Machel Montano and Arjuna Harjai (2022)
- "Jessica (Island Remix)" by Michaël Brun featuring Charly Black, Machel Montano, and J Perry (2023)
