= Block register territory =

Concept in rail transportation operations

Block register territory (BRT) is a designation applied to some lightly used segments of railroad track in the United States. In these areas, trains are only authorized to move into the territory when a special type of log book is filled out correctly. BRT is described in the General Code of Operating Rules (GCOR) as Rule 6.15. A standard block register has rows divided into five columns:

- An identifier for the train, work crew, or other equipment using the line
- The last name of the employee in charge of the equipment or crew
- The current date
- The time at which the track was entered
- The time at which the track was cleared

The first four columns of the register are filled out upon entering the block. When the track is exited, the last column is filled out and the entire entry is crossed out.

Generally, only one train can occupy block register territory at a time. Additional trains are only allowed to occupy the block if the operator of the incoming train has contacted all of the other employees named in the open entries in the block register. Train movements are then made at restricted speed, a low enough speed that the train could stop within half the distance between it and an oncoming train or obstacle.
