= Global (Bunji Garlin album) =

Studio album by Bunji Garlin
- Released: May 22, 2007
- Genre: Ragga; soca; dancehall
- Label: VP

Bunji Garlin chronology
Next Direction (2006)	Global (2007)	Fiery (2008)

Global is an album by Trinidadian ragga soca musician Bunji Garlin released in 2007 by VP Records. The album is Garlin's first that he aimed at international audiences, with previous releases aimed only at the West Indies, and he explained "In order for the genre to grow, we have to put out music that people throughout all of the islands can feel, not just for Trinidad".

== Background ==
The album features guest appearances by T.O.K. (on "Get Up Stand Up") and Freddie McGregor (on "One Family").

The song "Brrt" from this album is also featured on the Grand Theft Auto IV soundtrack.

== Critical reception ==
Professional ratings
Review scores
Source	Rating
AllMusic	3.5/5 stars

AllMusic's Rick Anderson took note that "Hindsight is 20/20, but the dancehall-soca fusion now known as "ragga soca" really was inevitable — in part because dancehall culture has so completely overtaken the Caribbean music scene, and in part because soca's bouncy, three-against-two rhythm has been an important element of the ragga sound for years. In fact, unless you're paying very close attention, you might not even notice that this album is more soca than reggae until several tracks into the program. Garlin's vocal delivery is straight out of the dancehall — more rapid-fire declamation than melodic calypso crooning. And it's extremely effective".

== Track listing ==
1. "No Super Hero"
2. "Pan and Soca"
3. "Brrt" (Marchout Riddim)
4. "Get Up Stand Up" - (featuring T.O.K.)
5. "Fire Fi Dem"
6. "Hardcore Lover" - (featuring Rita Jones)
7. "We Maniac"
8. "Globally"
9. "Raise Yuh Hand"
10. "Blaze It Up"
11. "Swing It" - (featuring Chris Black)
12. "One Family" - (featuring Freddie McGregor)
13. "Put in the Thing"
14. "Turn Me On"
15. "Hands Up"
