= Heavy Duty (album) =

Studio album by Xtatik
- Released: March 10, 1997
- Recorded: 1996, 1997
- Genre: Soca
- Label: JW Productions
- Producer: Machel Montano

Xtatik chronology
Men At Work (1996)	Heavy Duty (1997)	Xtatik Live (1997)

Heavy Duty is an album released by popular Soca band Xtatik from Trinidad and Tobago in 1997. The album was considered one of the most successful Soca albums at the time of its release. In a 2004 interview, lead vocalist of the band Machel Montano claimed it was his favourite album of all time.

The song Big Truck on the album won Trinidad's 1997 Annual Road March Competition for Trinidad and Tobago Carnival.

== Critical reception ==
Professional ratings
Review scores
Source	Rating
Allmusic	4/5 stars

AllMusic gave the album a 4 out of 5 stars rating.

== Track listing ==
1. "Intro"
2. "Big Truck"
3. "Follow Yuh Partner"
4. "Winerboi"
5. "Calypso Nice"
6. "Tayee Tayee"
7. "J'Ouvert Girls"
8. "What They Say (They Say)"
9. "Pretty Gyal"
10. "No Carnival"
11. "Crowded"
12. "Music Farm"
13. "Outro"

== Vocals ==
- Machel Montano - Lead Vocalist
- Wayne Rodriguez - Vocalist
- Darryl Henry (Farmer Nappy) - Vocalist
- Vincent Rivers - Vocalist
- Winston Bailey - Vocalist
- Sean Caruth - Vocalist
- Samuel Jack - Vocalist
- Joseph Rivers - Vocalist
- Richard Felix - Vocalist
- Nicholas Antoine - Vocalist
- Errol Singh - Vocalist

== Musicians ==
- Bass - Vincent Rivers, Joseph Rivers
- Trumpet - Nicholas Antoine
- Tenor Saxophone - Charles Dougherly
- Trombone - Kurt Francisco
