= BRT Laboratories =

DNA sequencing laboratories

BRT Laboratories, Inc
- Company type: Privately owned
- Industry: Biotechnology
- Founded: 1945
- Headquarters: Baltimore, MD, United States
- Key people: Robert E. Wenk, MD
- Website: brtlabs.com

BRT Laboratories, Inc. is a Baltimore, Maryland-based biotechnology company that performs DNA testing. The company has three divisions: Relationship Testing, Forensics, and Clinical Services. It is a privately held, wholly owned subsidiary of Baltimore RH Typing Laboratory, Inc.

== History ==
BRT Laboratories, Inc., with its parent company Baltimore RH Typing Laboratory, has been a provider of products and services to the medical, research, and commercial communities since 1945. In April 2000, BRT Laboratories, Inc. was established as an independent and wholly owned subsidiary of Baltimore Rh Typing Laboratory, Inc., for the purpose of continuing commercial testing and service activities.

== Services ==
=== Relationship Testing ===
BRT's Relationship Testing division offers services in Paternity Testing and Family reunification Immigration Testing. DNA testing can identify relationships between parent and child, full or half siblings, grandparent and grandchild, uncles or aunts and nieces or nephews, as well as identical and non-identical twins. The Laboratory is accredited by the AABB (formerly, American Association of Blood Banks). Testing can be performed for submission in legal proceedings (court admissible) or for personal knowledge.

Application for immigration to the United States and Canada often requires documentation of biological relationship between a petitioner and his or her beneficiary. DNA testing can be used to prove a relationship if documents are absent or challenged. The US Immigration and Naturalization Service (INS) and United States Citizenship and Immigration Services (USCIS) offices accept DNA testing results from AABB accredited laboratories only.

=== Forensics ===
BRT's Forensics division offers services in serology screening, DNA profiling, and case review. These services are contracted by government agencies, defense counsel, and private citizens or organizations for several applications.

Government agencies contract BRT’s Forensic division for criminal and “no-suspect” casework. The Laboratory offers STR analysis and Y-STR analysis with each of the commercial kits commonly used in the US. The Forensic division is accredited by ASCLD/Lab – International and meets the requirements of ISO/IEC 17025. BRT has also received accreditation from the Texas Department of Public Safety and has been approved by the Maryland State Police Forensic Science Division for analysis of casework that can be uploaded to CODIS. The Laboratory adheres to current Scientific Working Group on DNA Analysis Methods (SWGDAM) and FBI DNA Advisory Board (DAB) guidelines.

Defense counsel contract BRT Laboratories to perform case reviews, which may include assistance with the interpretation of subpoena documents, sample retesting, and/or expert witness testimony.

The Forensic division also provides serology and DNA profiling services to private citizens for infidelity testing and to private organizations or medical professionals for sample identity verification.

=== Clinical Services ===
BRT's Clinical Services division is licensed by the State of Maryland Department of Health and Mental Hygiene for Molecular Biology and Molecular Genetics and is registered under the US Department of Health and Human Services' Clinical Laboratory Improvement Amendments. Test offerings include Tuberculosis testing and Bone Marrow Engraftment (chimerism) monitoring.

BRT’s tuberculosis (TB) testing is performed using the Interferon-gamma release assay T-SPOT.TB. This assay is recognized by the Centers for Disease Control and Prevention as a special TB blood test with an accuracy of diagnosing active TB >80%.

Bone Marrow Engraftment monitoring assesses the relative ratio of donor and recipient cell populations in the post-transplant peripheral blood or bone marrow of the patient. BRT performs this test using STR analysis, the current "gold standard," yielding a sensitivity of 95–98%.

== Accreditations ==
- Member of and accredited by the American Association of Blood Banks (AABB)
- Registered by the Clinical Laboratory Improvement Amendments (CLIA)
- Licensed by the State of Maryland Department of Health & Mental Hygiene
- Licensed by the State of New York Department of Health
- 17025 and Forensic Requirements for Accreditation (FRA 1 and FRA 2)
- College of American Pathologists (CAP) Proficiency Participant
- American Society of Crime Laboratory Directors (ASCLD/LAB-International)

== Locations ==
BRT is headquartered in Baltimore, Maryland, with an extensive network of sample collection centers located across the United States and throughout the world.
