= Here Comes the Band (album) =

Studio album by Xtatik
- Released: March 14, 2000
- Recorded: 1999, 2000
- Genre: Soca
- Label: JW Productions
- Producer: Machel Montano

Xtatik chronology
Any Minute Now (1999)	Here Comes the Band (2000)	Same High (2001)

Here Comes the Band is an album by Trinidadian Soca artist Machel Montano and his band Xtatik released in 2000. The album's 22 tracks feature different singers on each, with the album covering a diverse range of styles. Allmusic writer Jason Birchmeier gave it a 3-star review, while in World Music: The Rough Guide, the authors view that "the 10 or so tracks that really work are great".

== Track listing ==
1. "Millennium (Intro)"
2. "Here Comes the Band" - Machel Montano
3. "Manners" - Farmer Nappy & Derwin Vallie
4. "Water Flowing" - Machel Montano (featuring Farmer Nappy)
5. "Drag Yuh Bow" - Peter C. Lewis
6. "Break Bottle" - Farmer Nappy (featuring Denise Belfon)
7. "Kiki" - Peter C. Lewis (featuring Lexxus & CL Smooth)
8. "Disco Grand Daddy" - Lord Nelson
9. "Shake That Business" - Kerwin Vallie
10. "Do You Know" - Yardmen College
11. "Bumper Carz (Back Up Back Up)" - Mr. Cash & Machel Montano (featuring Farmer Nappy)
12. "Agoni" - Peter C. Lewis
13. "Play Whe" - Lord Nelson
14. "Oh My Gosh" - Peter C. Lewis & Bigga
15. "People Business" - Shawn Bailey
16. "Free Yuh Mind" - Youth Promotion Crew
17. "Turn It Up" - Peter C. Lewis
18. "Jab Jab Re-Incarnation" - Ken Hunter (featuring The Laventille Rhythm Section)
19. "Five Kind of Wine" - Peter C. Lewis
20. "Going the Distance" - Yardmen College
21. "La Diablesse" - Shawn Bailey
22. "Biggie" - Lord Nelson
