= Differentology =

"Differentology (Ready for the Road)"

Single by Bunji Garlin

from the album Differentology
- Released: November 7, 2012
- Recorded: November 2012
- Genre: World; soca; jazz
- Length: 4:21
- Label: Sheriff; VP; RCA
- Songwriter(s): Bunji Garlin
- Producer(s): Keron "Sherriff" Thomson

Bunji Garlin singles chronology
"Born Ready" (2011)	"Differentology (Ready for the Road)" (2012)	"Carnival Tabancca" (2013)

"Differentology" is a song by Trinidadian singer and songwriter Bunji Garlin. "Differentology" was released by Sheriff Music on November 7, 2012, as one of the first of Garlin's offerings for the 2013 Carnival season in Trinidad and Tobago. The song was written by Garlin, and produced by Keron Thompson. Garlin stated that the song came to him while in an impromptu session with the guitarist.

The track was remixed by Major Lazer for their free EP Lazers Never Die Vol. 4.

"Differentology" was well received by soca music fans and critics alike. The song peaked at number 9 on the iTunes World Music Chart, and the exact download numbers have not yet been published.

A music video for "Differentology" was filmed in February 2013, directed and edited by Nigel Thompson (Black Ice Studios).

The song has been featured in an episode of ABC network's Grey's Anatomy and in the NBC arena.

During the 2019 Canadian federal election, the song was used heavily by New Democratic Party leader Jagmeet Singh.

== Background and inspiration ==
"Differentology" is a song that was written and recorded by Bunji Garlin in November 2012 and produced by Keron Thompson.

In a 2013 interview with Trinidad Urban radio station Slam 100.5 FM before his concert on February 7, 2013, Garlin said that the song came to him during an impromptu session in the studio with guitarist Nigel Rojas.

== Composition ==
"Differentology" has been described as a "Latin jazz infused soca ode to Carnival." The song is a call to music fans especially fans of Carnival and has a repetitive beat that becomes a hook, inviting you to be "ready for de road" at Carnival time. Its lyrics are naturally rhythmic and rhyming like many of Garlin's compositions. The song's unique appeal comes from the rhythmic beat that runs through it and the masterful guitar accompaniment, all embellished by Garlin's powerful and commanding vocals.

== Critical reception ==
Individual songs released for Carnival generally do not get critiqued extensively; however, "Differentology" was one of the few songs that merited many interviews and several articles in the local media in Trinidad and Tobago. A line in the song, "...and the crowd now waking up" was misheard by many and taken to be "and the cow now waking up". This phrase became well known among locals and has spawned a few parody accounts on popular social networks.

Differentology was nominated for Best International Performance in the 2013 Soul Train Awards.

The song also won the Hot 97 Battle of the Beats Competition. Unanimously out voting the likes of Eminem, No Malice, DJ Khaled and August Alsina.

== Music video ==
A music video for "Differentology" was released on May 17, 2013. The music video was directed by Nigel Thompson (Black Ice Studios Ltd). Most of the scenery was filmed in February 2013. The video features Garlin in Viking gear and other costumed masqueraders. Garlin tweeted pictures from the video shoot during filming. At least one other scene was still to be filmed after the first days of filming.

A music video for "Differentology (Major Lazer Remix)" was shot during the Major Lazer Concert held in Trinidad and Tobago on September 23, 2013. The video was directed and edited by Aaron Richards (ADR Productions).

== Awards ==
2013 – Soul Train Award for Best International Performance. This Soul Train Award category is one of four in which the winner is chosen by fan votes.

== Cover ==
No cover versions of "Differentology" have been officially released; however, there is at least one video on YouTube.

== Live performances ==
During the 2013 Carnival season in Trinidad, Garlin performed "Differentology" many times, in most appearances opening his act with the song and then closing with it at the end of his set. He usually introduced the phenomenal guitarist Nigel Rojas with whom he collaborated and who performed with him at those events.

Garlin is expected to continue performing the song at many international concerts as is customary for many soca artists at the end of the Carnival season in Trinidad and Tobago.

== Usage in popular culture ==
- The New Democratic Party used "Differentology" as their campaign song during the 2019 Canadian federal election.

== Track listings and formats ==
Upon Differentology

- 04. "Differentology" (Ready for the Road) – 4:20
- 08. "Differentology" (Ready for the Road) (Major Lazer Remix) – 5:00

Ready For the Road – EP (International Release)

- 01. "Differentology" (Ready for the Road) – 4:20
- 02. "Differentology" (Ready for the Road) (Major Lazer Remix) – 5:00
- 03. "Carnival Tabanca" – 3:49
- 04. "Carnival Tabanca" (Viking Remix) – 4:32
- 05. "Truck On D Road" (Solo Version) – 3:23
- 06. "Red Light District" – 4:09

== Personnel ==
- Lyrics and vocals by Bunji Garlin (Birth name: Ian Antonio Alvarez)
- Spanish guitarist: Nigel Rojas
- Producer: Keron "Sheriff" Thompson (Black Ice Studios)
- Distribution and marketing: Jarrod Faria (J-Rod Records)
