= Kernal Roberts =

Kernal "Kitch" Roberts (born Kernal Lincoln Roberts, 20 September 1980) is a soca producer, singer and songwriter from Trinidad and Tobago. He is best known for writing and producing Trinidad and Tobago Carnival Road March winners in 2006, 2007, 2010, 2011, and 2012. He also won the power soca monarch four times in a row from 2010 to 2013. Roberts currently lives at "Rainorama" the home of his father, calypsonian Lord Kitchener.
