= Brain Research UK =

United Kingdom medical research charity

Brain Research UK, formerly known as the Brain Research Trust, is a United Kingdom medical research charity dedicated to the research of neurological diseases and conditions.

Registered charity no. 1137560
