= Cook Records =

American record label (1952–1966)

Cook Records was a record label founded by Emory Cook (1913–2002), an audio engineer and inventor. From 1952 to 1966, Cook used his Sounds of our Times and Cook Laboratories record labels to demonstrate his philosophy about sound, recording equipment, and manufacturing techniques.

== Recording techniques ==
In addition to Sounds of Our Times, Cook released Road Recordings, a "White Label" series, test and binaural recordings.

Cook is sometimes said to have intended only to show the quality of his recording and molding process at an audio fair, with the added feature of binaural (i.e., stereophonic) sound to get attention. The overwhelming response led him to produce and sell his equipment and to produce records.

His micro-fusion process of pressing records required each mold be filled individually by people in a production line. The mold was then passed to someone at a record press. Cook thought it would be better for record stores to press records themselves, as they were requested by customers, rather than pay shipping and stocking fees. By 1958 there were record stores on Caribbean islands from Puerto Rico to Trinidad that had a Cook record-press in the back. Some stores began recording music. They shipped the master tape recording of an album to Cook, who made a metal mold of it and then returned it to the store. When a copy of a record was requested, the mold was filled with powdered vinyl and then placed in a high-pressure press.

== Cook Records ==
=== Genres ===
The 140-plus albums on Cook Records include European and American concert music, U.S. and Caribbean popular and traditional music, calliope and carrousel music, as well as mechanical and natural sounds. Over a quarter of these albums contained music from the Caribbean, many featuring calypso or steel bands. Many recordings were made in the field rather than by bringing musicians to a studio, with Cook traveling around Trinidad in particular, recording music wherever he heard it. Several of the first high-fidelity recordings of theatre organ music were made on Cook by British organist Reginald Foort, who first recorded using the name "Michael Cheshire."

=== Binaural recording ===
Cook Records may be best known because, in 1952, they were first to produce commercial stereo records, which Emory Cook called "binaural". About 50 "binaural" recordings were released in all (the term "binaural sound" should not be confused with the modern term of that name which describes 'inner-ear-microphone' recordings). Cook's sound was achieved by putting the output from two separate microphones on two independent monaural tracks on the same side of a record. On these records, the grooves of the first channel formed a single "band" that was concentric with and surrounded a second band that started about halfway into the record and which contained the grooves of the second stereo channel. The V-groove or Westrex stereo LP and cartridge that would become standard, which could play each wall of the groove as a separate track, were not released until 1957. After 1957, Cook also released V-groove stereo recordings as "Cook Vector Stereo". In the intervening years, Cook Labs, Livingston, Audiosphere, and Atlantic all released the two-track binaural disks.

=== The Clip-on ===
In order to play back binaural disks, a listener would need two separate pick-ups (LP cartridges), both of them monaural. Since the two pick-ups on a playback system had to be kept in very precise alignment with each other, Cook had to invent and market a system that could do this. Cook created a "binaural phonograph adaptor" or "Binaural Clip-On" which functioned as an outrigger that could be used on existing standard tonearm to hold a second pickup. The Binaural Clip-On was a well-made aluminum device that Cook Laboratories sold for US$5.95. The Clip-On made provision for very fine adjustment of the spacing of the cartridges: this level of adjustment was needed, because only a very slight misalignment of the two cartridge styluses would produce a phase difference between the two channels.

The fact that he was able to design and sell such a device at a reasonable price testified to Emory Cook's brilliance as an innovative engineer, who is now honored in the Audio Engineering Society Hall of Fame. It's also a testament to the passion and determination of early devotees of stereophonic sound that they would buy and deploy such a system.

=== Tonearm ===
In addition to working with Livingston Electronics Corporation (of Livingston, New Jersey) to release the records, Cook worked with Livingston to develop and market a tuning fork–shaped tonearm that was designed and built to take two pickups. Like the Clip-On, the unique tonearm allowed for the simultaneous use of two monaural cartridges, and spaced them apart at a distance that exactly corresponded to the distance separating the outer and inner band of grooves. And like the Clip-On, the tonearm also allowed for calibration of the position of the stylus within the groove so that the two tracks would play in synch and proper phase. To facilitate these fine adjustments, Cook sold a test disk with a recording of a "Binaural Clock" that had clicks that a user could adjust to. Other "HiFi" companies of the day followed Livingston in marketing binaural arms.

=== Preamp ===
The two tracks on Cook's binaural discs had different equalization curves. The RIAA equalization standard had not yet been adopted when Cook began his work. The bass turnover of 500 Hz on both tracks and the rolloff of 0 on the inside band and -11 on the outside band were meant to allow for greater modulation in the recording. As the two pickups required two preamps and HiFi preamps of the day included manual settings for turnover and rolloff, the difference in equalization was not a particular burden. Nevertheless, Cook designed and sold a two-channel preamp meant for binaural playback. While this preamp did not allow for the manual setting of turnover and rolloff of other manufacturers' disks, it did work for Cook-type binaural records. Livingston had also come out with a "stereophonic" integrated amplifier (i.e., including the preamps) by 1954.

=== Microfusion pressing ===
Cook's monaural records were also considered superior, with a wide dynamic range, and sold at a premium ($4.98 for a 12-inch disk) about twice the then-standard price for LP vinyl records. Their superiority was due to the superb quality of his recording techniques and his mastering which allowed for greater dynamic range and low noise levels, but also to the fact that, by 1955, they were manufactured by a special pressing process he developed. This process — which he named "Microfusion" — used cold vinyl powder sprayed into a metal mold (which looked somewhat like a round waffle iron), each one of which was then placed into a hot stamping press, the heat and pressure of which would melt the particles of plastic, and fuse them together while simultaneously imprinting the surface of each side of the record them with a negative image of the positive image of the record grooves that had been molded onto each side of the metal mold (the two sides were hinged together, which increased the waffle-iron resemblance. This process produced a better "fill" of the mold, which resulted in lower surface noise compared to the hot vinyl "biscuit" process that was the method of record-pressing standard process used by other manufacturers.

=== Unusual recordings ===
Strange projects and strange sound recordings were also part of the Cook legacy. "Night Rain" and katydid recordings were released alongside Caribbean steel band and blues recordings. A record like "Speed the Parting Guest" could even today fulfill its duty by speeding a parting guest in our modern day world. Records like "Burlesque Uncovered" in which he recorded a striptease show in sound, are today still amusing. A record like "Rail-dynamics", recorded on rainy nights along the tracks of the New York Central Railroad still delivers that 'rainy night feeling' it must have had when it was recorded. Cook's 1956 binaural record of decades-old steam-driven "Calliope and Carousels" is amusing not only for their tunes, but for hearing the audible struggles the machines had to go through just to produce a sound, and play anything even approximately in tune, all lovingly captured and preserved in their sour-note glory while the original 19th century machines could still function at all.

Though an audio artist and engineer, Cook covered himself by having musicians he recorded along the road sign pieces of paper giving him permission to market their performances, showcasing that he was also a businessman. In most cases, those papers stated that they sold all the rights to the recordings he made of them for the payment of one dollar. Naturally not all recordings were made for such cheap prices. But like a few others who did "road recordings", he brought his equipment to the artists wherever they were, and caught performances that otherwise likely would not have ever been recorded.

=== Stereo ===
In today's recordings, stereo means "left-right". A marching band on a stereo recording or a train, such as on Cook's Rail Dynamics, will run from left to right or vice versa. But, in most cases, Cook did not bother about left and right. For him stereo meant space and depth and he wanted to design his stereo sound with a different "image". So in most of his recordings the train would not go from left to right; he would instead place his microphones on both sides of the railroad track, carefully creating a small space for his wires under the track so that the train would not cut the wires as it passed by them. This way, with the mikes recording on the "same plane of movement", the train comes towards the listener and then seems to drive right over him. This was way before surround sound systems but the effect was perhaps even better than a "left-right pass-by" recording, as it captured subtle nuances produced by different moving parts on either side of train, adding a more realistic dynamic to the overall sound that was unique to Cook's mic placement techniques.

=== Remains of the company ===
Emory and Martha Cook donated the US branch of their record company, master tapes, patents, and papers to the Smithsonian Institution in 1990. The recordings are currently operated by Smithsonian Folkways.

The Trinidad branch of Cook was sold by Emory Cook some point earlier. There are a number of Trinidad-only releases (mostly singles) that Smithsonian is unable to reissue because their master tapes belong to the owners of the Trinidad branch.

== See also ==
- List of record labels
