= Xtatik =

Trinidad and Tobago Soca band

- Origin: Port of Spain, Trinidad and Tobago
- Genres: Soca, Calypso, Dancehall
- Years active: 1984-1989 (as Pranasonic Express); 1989-present (as Xtatik)
- Members: Machel Montano (vocals); Joseph Rivers (guitar); Dean Williams (guitar); Vincent Rivers (bass guitar); Derwin Vallie (keyboards); Sterling Paul (trombone); Oral Rodriguez (saxophone); Marlon Roach (trumpet); Rodney Daniel (trumpet); Gregory Pegus (drums); Darryl Henry (percussion); Peter C. Lewis (co-lead vocalist 1998-); Selwyn Buckmire (drums)
- Website: xtatik.com

Xtatik is a Trinidad and Tobago Soca band led by Machel Montano.

== History ==
The band evolved from Pranasonic Express, which was formed in 1984 in Port of Spain. The original line-up was (then 9-year-old) Machel Montano (vocals), Joseph Rivers (guitar), Vincent Rivers (bass guitar), Derwin Vallie (keyboards), Sterling Paul (trombone), Oral Rodriguez (saxophone), Marlon Roach (trumpet), Rodney Daniel (trumpet), Gregory Pegus (drums), and Darryl Henry (percussion). The group became Xtatik in 1989. Their early albums Breaking Out (1990) and One Step Ahead (1991) were both locally successful, and the band had several hit singles in Trinidad & Tobago. In 1991 they recruited guitarist Roger George and moved to a sound that fused Soca and Dancehall. Several albums followed in this vein and the band won road march titles at carnivals in Caribana and Miami in 1994. In 1995 they successfully blended soca and house on "Come Dig It", giving them exposure in the United States. They won the Trinidad Road March title in 1997 with "Big Truck", and again in 1998 with "Footsteps". In 1998, Peter C. Lewis joined as co-lead vocalist. In the late 1990s, Xtatik album releases were attributed to Machel & Xtatik for Charge (1998) and Machel Montano & Xtatik for Any Minute Now (1999). More albums followed in the 2000s.

Xtatik won the Party Band Competition in 1996. According to -Metro Connections, Montano "successfully crosses boundaries between young and old, between Jamaica and Trinidad and between soca and dancehall".

== Past members ==
Samuel Jack (1990-1996)

Dean Williams (2000-2006)

== Discography ==
- X Amount Ah Sweetness (1992)
- Soca Style Hot (1993)
- By All Means (EP) (1994)
- Loose Yuh Waist (1995)
- Men at Work (1996)
- Heavy Duty (1997)
- Xtatik Live (1997)
- Charge (1998)
- Any Minute Now (1999)
- Here Comes the Band (2000)
- Same High (2001)
- On the Cusp (2002)
- The Xtatik Circus (2003) – as "Xtatik Band 5.0"
