= Spice discography =

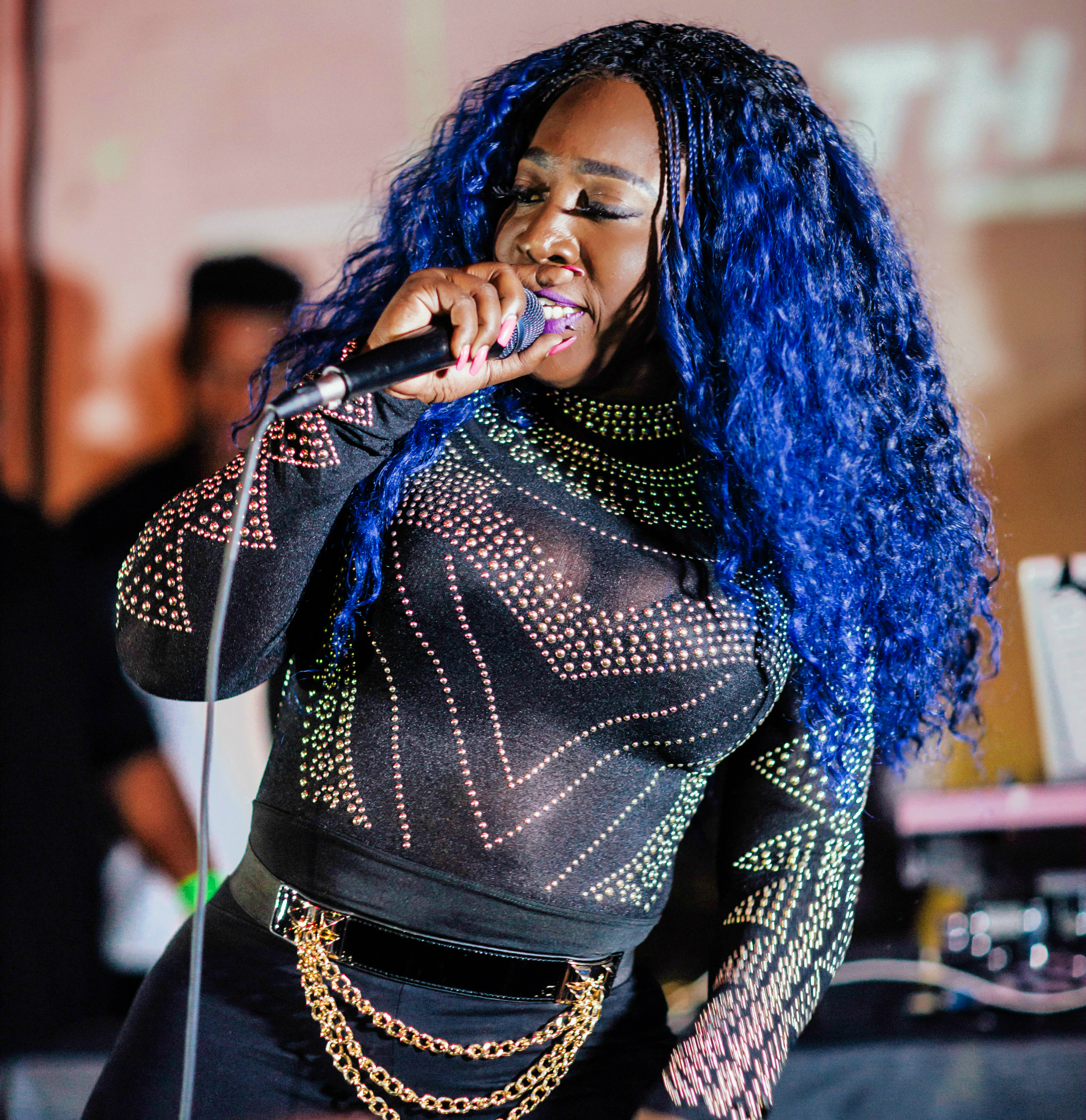
- Spice performing in Brooklyn, New York in November 2016
- Studio albums: 3
- EPs: 2
- Singles: 97
- Music videos: 76
- Mixtapes: 1

Jamaican dancehall recording artist Spice has released three studio albums, two extended plays, one mixtape, ninety-seven singles (including twelve as a featured artist) and seventy-six music videos (including ten as a featured artist).

In July 2009, Spice released her debut extended play Spice on 17 July 2009, by Zojak. She signed a recording contract with VP Records. Her second extended play So Mi Like It was released on 2 December 2014, and debuted at number 14 on Billboard's Top Reggae Albums. The EP spawned the singles "So Mi Like It" and "Conjugal Visit" featuring Vybz Kartel.

Following a legal dispute with her record label, Spice independently released her first full-length release, a mixtape titled Captured, on 2 November 2018. The mixtape debuted at number one on the Billboard Reggae Albums chart and included the single "Black Hypocrisy". Her debut studio album, 10, was released in 2021 and spawned the single "Go Down Deh" featuring Shaggy and Sean Paul.

In 2024, Spice released her second album, Mirror 25, on her own label, which was titled in honour of her 25 years as a musician in the industry.

== Studio albums ==
List of studio albums, with selected details and chart positions
Title	Details	Peak chart positions
Title	Details	US Reggae
10	Released: 6 August 2021; Label: VP; Formats: CD, digital download, streaming	6
Emancipated	Released: 26 August 2022; Label: Spice Official, Stealth; Formats: Digital download, streaming	7
Mirror 25	Released: 9 August 2024; Label: Spice Official; Formats: Digital download, streaming	7

== Extended plays ==
List of extended plays, with selected details and chart positions
Title	Details	Peak chart positions
Title	Details	US Reggae
Spice	Released: 17 July 2009; Label: Truck Back Records; Zojak; Formats: Digital download, streaming	—
So Mi Like It	Released: 2 December 2014; Label: VP; Formats: Digital download, streaming	14

== Mixtapes ==
List of mixtapes, with selected details and chart positions
Title	Details	Peak chart positions
Title	Details	US Reggae
Captured	Released: 2 November 2018; Label: Spice Official; Formats: CD, digital download, streaming	1

== Singles ==
=== As lead artist ===
List of singles as lead artist, with selected chart positions, showing year released and album name
Title	Year	Peak chart positions		Certifications	Album
Title	Year	US R&B/HH	US Reggae Digital	Certifications	Album
"Complain"	2003	—	—		Non-album singles
"Right There" (with Toi)	2004	—	—		Non-album singles
"Fight Over Man"	2005	—	—		Non-album singles
"Rude Boy Love" (with Pinchers)	2006	—	—		Non-album singles
"Romping Shop" (with Vybz Kartel)	2009	76	—		Pon Di Gaza
"Slim vs Fluffy" (with Pamputtae)	2009	—	—		Non-album singles
"Jim Screechie"	2010	—	—		Non-album singles
"Body Great"	2012	—	—		Non-album singles
"Hide & Do It"	2012	—	—		Non-album singles
"Crosses" (featuring Elephant Man)	2012	—	—		Non-album singles
"Dear Honorable"	2012	—	—		Non-album singles
"Nah Tek No Talk"	2012	—	—		Non-album singles
"Cyaan Manage It"	2012	—	—		Non-album singles
"Dun Wife"	2013	—	—		Non-album singles
"Whining Time"	2013	—	—		Non-album singles
"Twerk"	2013	—	—		Non-album singles
"Cheat On Me" (with Mavado)	2013	—	—		Non-album singles
"NTN New"	2013	—	—		Non-album singles
"Only Ting Me Want" (with Alkaline)	2013	—	—		Non-album singles
"So Mi Like It"	2013	—	—	BPI: Silver; MC: Gold	So Mi Like It
"Walk Like a Dog"	2014	—	—		Non-album singles
"Itsy Bitsy"	2014	—	—		Non-album singles
"Likkle Bit"	2014	—	—		Non-album singles
"Hustla" (with Fresh Tea)	2014	—	—		Non-album singles
"Wine Up Mi Body"	2014	—	—		Non-album singles
"Bounce"	2014	—	—		Non-album singles
"Back Bend"	2014	—	—		Non-album singles
"Bend Ova" (with DJ Greg)	2015	—	—		Non-album singles
"Go Go"	2015	—	—		So Mi Like It
"Conjugal Visit" (featuring Vybz Kartel)	2015	—	—		So Mi Like It
"Nuh Secret"	2015	—	—		Non-album singles
"Needle Eye"	2015	—	—		Non-album singles
"Hold Tight"	2015	—	—		Non-album singles
"Uh Oh"	2015	—	—		Non-album singles
"Sight & Wine"	2016	—	—		Non-album singles
"Inna Mi Pocket"	2016	—	—		Non-album singles
"Marijuana"	2016	—	—		Non-album singles
"Indicator"	2016	—	—		Non-album singles
"Siddung"	2016	—	—		Non-album singles
"Philosophy"	2016	—	—		Non-album singles
"50 Shadez"	2017	—	—		Non-album singles
"Long Division" (with I-Octane)	2017	—	—		Non-album singles
"Indicator (Soca Remix)" (featuring Bunji Garlin)	2017	—	—		Non-album singles
"Sheet"	2017	—	—		Non-album singles
"Beef Patty"	2017	—	—		Non-album singles
"No Worries" (with D'Angel)	2017	—	—		Non-album singles
"Set Me Suh" (with Tiana)	2017	—	—		Non-album singles
"Robot Wine"	2017	—	—		Non-album singles
"Couple Up"	2017	—	—		Non-album singles
"Ukku Wine" (featuring TC)	2017	—	—		Non-album singles
"Receipt"	2017	—	—		Non-album singles
"Tik Tak"	2018	—	—		Non-album singles
"Duffle Bag"	2018	—	—		Non-album singles
"Gum"	2018	—	—		Captured
"Yaaas Goodie"	2018	—	—		Captured
"Under Fire"	2018	—	—		Captured
"Stress Free"	2018	—	—		Non-album singles
"Woi"	2018	—	—		Non-album singles
"Down For Me" (with Doktor)	2018	—	—		Non-album singles
"Black Hypocrisy"	2018	—	1		Captured
"Mahma Man"	2018	—	—		Captured
"Romantic Mood"	2018	—	—		Captured
"Cool It"	2018	—	—		Captured
"Mine Mine Mine"	2018	—	—		Captured
"Genie"	2018	—	—		Captured
"Trouble" (with Destra Garcia)	2019	—	—		D-20
"Weh Me Want" (featuring Mettal)	2019	—	—		Non-album singles
"Rush"	2019	—	—		Non-album singles
"Back Way" (with Vybz Kartel)	2019	—	—		Non-album singles
"Pony" (with Big Narstie)	2019	—	—		Non-album singles
"Bruck It" (with Jugglerz)	2019	—	—		Jugglerz Radio
"Tables Turn"	2019	—	—		Non-album singles
"Rolling"	2020	—	—		Non-album singles
"Walk Out" (with Cadenza & Ms Banks)	2020	—	—		Dead Set
"Inches"	2020	—	—		Non-album singles
"Head"	2020	—	—		Non-album singles
"Hygiene"	2020	—	—		Non-album singles
"Frenz"	2020	—	—		10
"Watch My Life"	2021	—	—		Non-album singles
"Hydraulics Wine"	2021	—	—		Non-album singles
"I Feel A Way"	2021	—	—		Non-album singles
"Clean"	2021	—	—		Non-album singles
"Over Again" (Remix) (with Charly Black & Ne-Yo)	2021	—	—		Non-album singles
"Money Walk"	2021	—	—		Non-album singles
"Pay For It" (with Konshens & Rvssian)	2021	—	—		Red Reign
"Go Down Deh" (featuring Sean Paul & Shaggy)	2021	—	—	BPI: Silver; MC: Platinum	10
"Send It Up"	2021	—	—		10
"Condensed Milk" (with Cham)	2021	—	—		Non-album singles
"Private Message" (with Vybz Kartel)	2021	—	—		Non-album singles
"Different Category"	2022	—	—		Non-album singles
"Po-Po" (featuring Nicho)	2022	—	—		Non-album singles
"Love Triangle (Pum Pum)"	2022	—	—		Non-album singles
"Jiggle" (featuring Demarco and Meeka)	2022	—	—		Non-album singles
"Clap Clap"	2022	—	—		Emancipated
"Sexerice" (with Jugglerz)	2022	—	—		Family
"Tape Measure"	2022	—	—		Emancipated
"Worlds Apart" (with Vybz Kartel and Patoranking)	2022	—	—		Non-album single
"God a Bless Me"	2023	—	—		Mirror 25
"Spice Marley"	2023	—	—		Non-album single
"Queen of the Dancehall"	2023	—	—		Mirror 25
"Jealous"	2023	—	—		Non-album singles
"Get Loose" (Remix) (with Agnez Mo)	2023	—	—		Non-album singles
"Bed a Rock"	2023	—	—		Non-album singles
"Hollywood"	2024	—	—		Non-album singles
"2085 Tea"	2024	—	—		Mirror 25
"Round Round" (with Busta Rhymes)	2024	—	—		Mirror 25
"Gangster"	2024	—	—		Mirror 25
"Pull Up" (with Lil Scrappy featuring Neutron The God)	2024	—	—		Non-album single
"Ex Boyfriend"	2024	—	—		Mirror 25
"Sitt'n Fi Chat"	2024	—	—		Non-album singles
"Dun Out (Remastered)"	2024	—	—		Non-album singles
"No Standing Up" (with Lady Lava)	2024	—	—		Non-album singles
"Beg nor Borrow"	2025	—	—		Non-album singles
"Eleven"	2025	—	—		Non-album singles
"Pop Pill"	2025	—	—		Moroccan Gold Riddim
"Slow Motion" (featuring Lavbbe)	2025	—	—		Non-album singles
"Pon The Tip" (with Rvssian)	2025	—	—		Non-album singles
"God Don't Play About Me"	2026	—	—		Non-album singles
"Soft Girl Era"	2026	—	—		Non-album singles
"Batty Bubble" (with Asa Bantan)	2026	—	—		Non-album singles
"Degree" (with CJTheChemist)	2026	—	—		Non-album singles
"Clean and Fresh" (with DJ Mac and CrashDummy)	2026	—	—		Non-album singles
"That Girl" (with ZJ Chrome)	2026	—	—		Non-album singles
"Volcano"	2026	—	—		Non-album singles
"Miss World Body" (with La Joaqui)	2026	—	—		Non-album singles
"Miggle" (with Marlon Easy)	2026	—	—		Non-album singles
"—" denotes a recording that did not chart or was not released in that territory.

=== As featured artist ===
List of singles as featured artist, with selected chart positions, showing year released and album name
Title	Year	Peak chart positions		Album
Title	Year	US R&B/HH	US Reggae Digital	Album
"Take Him Out" (Mýa featuring Spice)	2011	—	—	K.I.S.S. (Keep It Sexy & Simple)
"Work It" (Touchless featuring Spice)	2013	—	—	Non-album singles
"Nasty" (Kid Ink featuring Jeremih & Spice)	2016	— (Note: "Nasty" did not enter the Hot R&B/Hip-Hop Songs chart, but peaked at number 27 on the R&B/Hip-Hop Digital Songs chart.)	—	Non-album singles
"Bala" (Bacano Bootleg #1) (Lao Ra featuring Tony Montana Music and Spice)	2017	—	—	Non-album singles
"You Don't Know Me" (Dre Skull Remix) (Jax Jones featuring Raye & Spice)	2017	—	—	Non-album singles
"Pull Up" (ZJ Elektra featuring Black Mattic, Dejour, Spice & Busy Signal)	2017	—	—	Press Play
"Ororo" (3gga featuring Spice & T-SER)	2017	—	—	Non-album singles
"Tick Tock" (Remix) (Dj Steel featuring Spice & Stylo G)	2018	—	—	Non-album singles
"Slow Whine" (Jimmy 2Timez featuring Demetri, Fatboy SSE & Spice)	2018	—	—	Non-album singles
"Imma Get It" (Tommie featuring Spice)	2018	—	—	Non-album singles
"Ride or Die" (JDiamondz featuring Spice)	2019	—	—	Virguoso
"Dumpling" (Remix) (Stylo G featuring Sean Paul & Spice)	2019	—	3	Non-album singles
"So Saucy" (Remix) (Kemar Highcon featuring Spice and Shaggy)	2020	—	—	Non-album singles
"Nightclubs" (UFO Fev featuring Spice)	2020	—	—	Non-album singles
"Bounce" (Remix) (DiCelebrityy featuring Spice & Sikka Rymes)	2020	—	—	Non-album singles
"Sex With You" (Triston Fivestar featuring Spice)	2021	—	—	I Am
"Solid Ground" (Pastor Stephen Blake featuring Spice)	2022	—	—	Non-album single
"Miss Bantu" (Harmonize featuring Spice)	2022	—	—	Made For Us
"Clockwork" (Stefflon Don featuring Spice)	2022	—	—	Non-album singles
"Werk" (Karlie Redd featuring Spice and Capella Grey)	2022	—	—	Non-album singles
"Bubble It" (Yemi Alade featuring Spice)	2022	—	—	African Baddie
"Likkle Miss" (Fine Nine Remix) (Nicki Minaj with Skeng featuring Spice, Destra Garcia, Patrice Roberts, Lady Leshurr, Pamputtae, Dovey Magnum, Lisa Mercedez & London Hill)	2022	—	—	Queen Radio: Volume 1
"Energy" (Flo Rida featuring Spice and Rotimi)	2023	—	—	Non-album singles
"Big Truck" (Mr Killa featuring Spice)	2023	—	—	Non-album singles
"Quiet It" (Jahyanai featuring Spice and Gold Up)	2025	—	—	Non-album singles
"Amanda" (Remix) (Zuchu featuring Spice)	2025	—	—	Non-album singles
"Rise Up" (Chip featuring Spice, Idris Elba and Keys N Krates)	2026	—	—	Non-album singles
"—" denotes releases that did not chart or were not released in that territory.

== Other charted songs ==
List of songs, with selected chart positions, showing year released and album name
Title	Year	Peak chart positions	Album
Title	Year	UK	Album
"First Time" (Krept & Konan featuring Tory Lanez & Spice)	2019	63	Revenge Is Sweet

== Guest appearances ==
List of non-single guest appearances, with other performing artists, showing year released and album name
Title	Year	Other artist(s)	Album
"I Want I Do I Get"	2004	Jimmy Cliff	Black Magic
"Hot"	2006	Beenie Man	Concept of Life
"Who God Bless"	2009	Vybz Kartel	None
"Dat Me Want"	2009	Mad Cobra	Helta Skelta
"Twenty Ten"	2010	Ghandi	None
"Whatever We Like"	2011	Gappy Ranks	Thanks & Praise
"Not After Your Love"	2011	Barbee	None
"Who Said"	2012	DJ Jazzy Joyce	Pandora's Box
"Represent (Jamaican Style)"	2013	Funktional J, Barka Moeri, Alozade	My Mellow Days
"All The Way"	2014	Elephant Man	Ragga Ragga Ragga 2014
"Mama Papa Fuck"	2014	Frassman Brilliant	None
"Jolly"	2014	ASAP Ferg, Bunji Garlin	Ferg Forever
"Benz Punaany"	2015	Sirene Factory	Sirene Factory
"What I Can Do"	2017	Charlie Sloth, Sean Kingston, Lady Leshurr	The Plug
"First Time"	2019	Krept and Konan, Tory Lanez	Revenge Is Sweet
"A Plus"	2020	Dexta Daps	VENT
"Robot Wine"	2021	CJTheChemist	The Formula, Vol. 1
"Any Man"	2021	Demarco	Melody
"Jiggle & Whine"	2024	Stonebwoy	Up & Runnin6
"Miss Pretty" (Remix)	2025	Bayka	Gyal Dem Shift
"Match My Mood"	2025	Sammy Virji, Flowdan	Same Day Cleaning
"No Competition"	2026	YowLevite	Levitate

== Music videos ==
=== As lead artist ===
List of music videos as lead artist, showing year released and directors
Title	Year	Director(s)	Notes	Ref.
"Right There" (with Toi)	2004	Lala	Released on the Bad Gal riddim medley.	
"Hype"	2004	Lala	Released on the Bad Gal riddim medley.	
"Fight Over Man"	2006	Big Daddy; Becky T		
"A Nuh Me"	2008	Nordia Rose	Released as a medley.	
"Not My Fault"	2008	Nordia Rose	Released as a medley.	
"Whoa"	2008	Michael Tingling	Released as a medley.	
"Giddy Up"	2008	Michael Tingling	Released as a medley.	
"Romping Shop" (with Vybz Kartel)	2008	Nordia Rose		
"No Matter What"	2009	Jay Jay		
"Slim vs Fluffy" (with Pamputtae)	2009	David G. Rogers		
"Back Broad"	2010	Jay Jay		
"Jim Screechie"	2010	Kirk Lee		
"Fun" (Remix) (featuring Missy Elliott)	2011	Spice		
"Hot Patty Wine"	2011	Dexter Pottinger		
"Body Great"	2012	Nicholas Lall		
"Come Wine" (with Specialist)	2012	Tenneile Baxter		
"The Holiday"	2012	Steven Bernard		
"Why You Mad" (with Tifa)	2012	Dexter Pottinger		
"Dun Wife"	2013	Michael Burbridge		
"Twerk"	2013	Michael Burbridge		
"Pon Top"	2013	Kareem J. Carr		
"Come Inside"	2013	Spice		
"So Mi Like It"	2014	Spice		
"Like a Man"	2014	Nicholas Lall		
"Conjugal Visit" (featuring Vybz Kartel)	2014	Xtreme Arts		
"Bend Ova"	2015	Jim Kanor		
"Back Bend"	2015	Xtreme Arts		
"Baby I Love You"	2015	Xtreme Arts		
"Needle Eye"	2015	Xtreme Arts		
"Sight & Wine"	2016	Xtreme Arts		
"Panda Remix"	2016	Xtreme Arts		
"Indicator"	2016	Chris Campbell		
"Indicator" (Soca Remix) (featuring Bunji Garlin)	2017	LOT Entertainment		
"Fifty Shadez"	2017	Xtreme Arts		
"Sheet"	2017	Xtreme Arts		
"Siddung"	2017	Xtreme Arts		
"Long Division" (with I-Octane)	2017	Sasha Bling		
"No Worries" (with D'Angel)	2017	Jahdean Van Gogh		
"Hooku Wine"	2017	Xtreme Arts	Released as a medley.	
"Couple Up"	2017	Xtreme Arts	Released as a medley.	
"Robot Wine"	2017	Xtreme Arts		
"Duffle Bag"	2018	Xtreme Arts		
"Gum"	2018	Xtreme Arts		
"Tick Tak"	2018	Xtreme Arts		
"Black Hypocrisy"	2018	Xtreme Arts		
"Under Fire"	2018	Xtreme Arts		
"Romantic Mood"	2018	Xtreme Arts		
"Cool It"	2019	Xtreme Arts		
"Trouble" (with Destra Garcia)	2019	Xtreme Arts		
"Mine Mine Mine"	2019	Xtreme Arts		
"Genie" (Version 1)	2019	Xtreme Arts		
"Genie" (Version 2)	2019	Xtreme Arts		
"Back Way" (with Vybz Kartel)	2019	Xtreme Arts		
"Pony" (with Big Narstie)	2019	Dego Visionz		
"Tables Turn"	2019	Xtreme Arts		
"Rolling"	2020	Xtreme Arts		
"02.20.2020"	2020	Xtreme Arts		
"Inches"	2020	Jay Will		
"Head"	2020	Magical Studio		
"Clean"	2020	Xtreme Arts		
"Hygiene"	2020	Magical Studio		
"Watch My Life"	2021	Demarco		
"Frenz"	2021	Xtreme Arts	Short movie.	
"Money Walk"	2021	Demarco		
"Pay For It" (with Konshens & Rvssian)	2021	Xtreme Arts		
"Bruck It" (with Jugglerz)	2021	Xtreme Arts		
"Go Down Deh" (featuring Sean Paul & Shaggy)	2021	Jay Will		

=== As featured artist ===
List of music videos as featured artist, showing year released and directors
Title	Year	Director(s)	Ref.
"Take Him Out" (Mýa featuring Spice)	2012	Ras Kassa	
"Hustla" (Fresh Tea featuring Spice)	2013	7 South & 2 Skullz	
"Nasty" (Kid Ink featuring Jeremih & Spice)	2016	Mike Ho	
"I Can Do" (Charlie Sloth featuring Sean Kingston, Spice & Lady Leshurr)	2017	TV Toxic	
"Ororo" (3gga featuring Spice & T-SER)	2017	Brainfack Propaganda	
"Slow Whine" (Jimmy 2Timez featuring Demetri, Fatboy SSE & Spice)	2018	Xtreme Arts	
"Imma Get It" (Tommie featuring Spice)	2018	Joe Yung Spike	
"Dumpling" (Remix) (Stylo G featuring Sean Paul & Spice)	2019	Kevin Hudson	
"Nightclubs" (UFO Fev featuring Spice)	2020	Rock Davis	
