= Lisa Mercedez =

Jamaican musical artist

- Origin: London, England
- Genres: Dancehall, Grime, Reggae
- Occupations: Singer, Songwriter, Rapper
- Instruments: Vocals
- Years active: 2005–present
- Labels: 3 Beat Records, Up-Tempo Records

Lisa Mercedez is a Jamaican dancehall recording artist, singer, and songwriter. She is best known for her collaborations with Stylo G, Vybz Kartel, Ms Banks, and touring with Nicki Minaj

== Career ==
Mercedez's career started in 2005, when she was introduced to Stylo G with whom she later collaborated in under the Stylo G led group 'Warning Crew' becoming the first and only female member. She coined her stage name 'Lisa Mercedez' as a tribute to her father, who was obsessed with his old Mercedes-Benz W201.

Mercedez moved on to become a solo artist and debuted with her first single 'Lets Get Drunk' in 2014 which was produced by DJ S.K.T. She took a hiatus from music before releasing numerous singles and her first mixtape BGC in 2017.

In February 2018, it was revealed that Mercedez would be one of only three women to perform at Wireless Festival in 2018. This caused controversy, leading to artist Lily Allen and DJ Annie Mac criticising the festival for its lack of diversity. Mercedez commented on the subject that "As a woman we have to work ten times as hard as the guys to make it".

== Personal life ==
On 3 March 2020 she announced her conversion to Islam on Instagram. The singer received death threats as she planned to continue her dancehall career. In August 2025, Lisa posted on Instagram that she had been baptized.

== Discography ==
=== Mixtapes ===
- Boss Girl Circle (2017)

=== Extended plays ===
- Drama Free (2020)

=== Singles ===
==== As lead artist ====
List of singles, showing year released and album name.
Title	Year	Album
"Lets Get Drunk"	2014	Non-album single
"Kitty Kat" (featuring Stefflon Don)	2016	Boss Girl Circle
"Shush"	2016	Boss Girl Circle
"Back It Up"	2017	Boss Girl Circle
"Badness"	2017	Boss Girl Circle
"Quint It"	2017	Non-album singles
"Waste Man"	2017	Non-album singles
"What A Night" (featuring Stylo G)	2018	Boss Girl Circle
"No Disturbance"	2018	Non-album singles
"Substance" (featuring Abra Cadabra)	2018	Non-album singles
"Feelings"	2018	Non-album singles
"Talk To Mi Nice"	2019	Non-album singles
"Drip" (with Hype and Fever)	2019	Non-album singles
"Shahada" (with Shy)	2020	Non-album singles
"Real Love" (with Vybz Kartel)	2020	Non-album singles
"Pressure Dem"	2020	Non-album singles
"Insecure" (featuring IQ)	2020	Non-album singles
"Night Love"	2020	Drama Free
"Bumpa"	2020	Drama Free
"As Long As Life" (with Vybz Kartel)	2020	Non-album singles
"Paranoid"	2021	Non-album singles
"Bored Asf"	2021	Non-album singles
"Hype & Bruk"	2022	Non-album singles
"Solo Tu" (with Angelo Flow)	2022	Non-album singles
"Karl Kani" (Remix) (with Yung Saber, Gaza Kim and Lady Lykez)	2023	Non-album singles
"Dutty Bwoy"	2023	Non-album singles

==== As featured artist ====
List of singles, showing year released and album name.
Title	Year	Album
"Be There" (Mimsi featuring Lisa Mercedez)	2017	Give It Away
"Yu Zimme (All Star VIP)" (Stylo G featuring Lisa Mercedez and Ms Banks)	2017	Non-album singles
"Bang" (Shaki Savi featuring Lisa Mercedez)	2018	Non-album singles
"Pop It Off" (Henry Fong with Vlien Boy featuring Lisa Mercedez)	2018	Non-album singles
"Hey Girl" (Shawn Antoine featuring Lisa Mercedez)	2018	Non-album singles
"Closer" (Jeorgia featuring Lisa Mercedez)	2018	Non-album singles
"Bad Bitch" (DJ Val S featuring Lisa Mercedez)	2018	Non-album singles
"Coño (Remix)" (Puri featuring Sneakbo & Lisa Mercedez)	2018	Non-album singles
"Everyday" (Redlight featuring Lisa Mercedez)	2018	Active
"Wait So Long (Cadenza Remix)" (Plan B featuring Ms Banks & Lisa Mercedez)	2018	Non-album singles
"No Makeup" (KickRaux, Stonebwoy and Yung Alpha featuring Lisa Mercedez)	2018	Non-album singles
"Driver Don't Stop" (Jammin featuring Lisa Mercedez)	2018	Non-album singles
"Run Dancehall" (Vybz Kartel featuring Lisa Mercedez)	2020	Non-album singles
"Badman" (Vybz Kartel and Massive B featuring Lisa Mercedez and Sikka Rymes)	2020	Non-album singles
"Likkle Miss (Fine Nine Remix)" (Nicki Minaj with Skeng featuring Spice, Destra Garcia, Patrice Roberts, Lady Leshurr, Pamputtae, Dovey Magnum, Lisa Mercedez & London Hill)	2022	Queen Radio: Volume 1
"Believe It" (Scrufizzer featuring Lisa Mercedez)	2023	Non-album singles
"Dancehall Girl" (Epik Jones with Shatta Wale and Ishawna featuring Lisa Mercedez and Jah Fabio)	2024	Non-album singles
