= Alkaline (musician) =

Jamaican musician (born 1993)

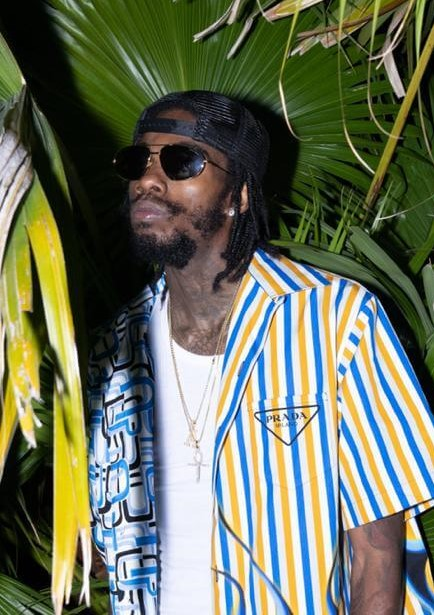
- Alkaline in 2022

Background information
- Also known as: Young Lawd; Vendetta Boss; ManHimselff
- Born: Earlan Bartley; 19 December 1993 (age 32); Kingston, Jamaica
- Genres: Dancehall, reggae
- Occupations: Singer; songwriter; record producer
- Instrument: Vocals
- Years active: 2011–present
- Label: Autobamb Records
- Website: alkalinemusiq.com

Earlan Bartley (born 19 December 1993), better known as Alkaline, is a Jamaican dancehall and reggae musician from Kingston, Jamaica. Known for entering the scene with an alluring perception heavily projected to his Jamaican audience and utilizing his stage name to represent the opposite principles of his personality, correlating the dichotomy of positive and negative. His music style captures the core of the dancehalls sound, whilst incorporating his unique artistry.

== Early life ==
Earlan was born in Kingston's Victoria Jubilee Hospital. He attended Ardenne High School and studied Media and Communication at the University of the West Indies. It was during his high school tenure when he began to develop a passion for music. With the support of his close friends, he visited local recording studios after school whenever he had the chance.

== Career ==
=== 2011–2014: Early career ===
Bartley began recording at the age of 16 and using the stage name Alkaline. When he was still in school, he made songs like "Proof", "Mi Love Woman", "Reflections" and "Missing You" creating long-term predictions and expressing his teenage experiences while making music videos on school grounds and in the streets of Jamaica with his close friends.

By 2013 he started to release a plethora of songs under the Cahban Rekords production. He made his first appearance on the Reggae Sumfest stage as an opener on 25 July 2013. In September of that year, he made a collaboration with dancehall artist Spice on the single "Only Ting Mi Want". Alkaline ended that year with a performance and first visit to Limón, Costa Rica on 15 December 2013.

Alkaline began the year of 2014 with his "Live Mi Life" concert on 31 January at Constant Spring, Jamaica. He eventually began working with Notnice Records, UIM Records and Zj Chrome becoming popular in Jamaica with a series of singles like "123", "High Suh", "Bruk Out", "Things Mi Love" and "Live Life" but the single he was very well known for was "Move Mountains", He went on to feature those singles on multiple EPs and Mixtapes. His early catalog propelled him to do consecutive shows around the Caribbean, North America, and Europe.

=== 2015–2016: Breakthrough with New Level Unlocked ===
In mid 2015 Alkaline pushed himself to the international market with his hit singles "On Fleek (Love Yuh Everything)" and "Ride on Me (Remix)" featuring Sean Kingston while consistently working on his debut album New Level Unlocked.

He released two other hit singles that year which was "ATM" on 30 September 2015, and "Champion Boy" on 30 October 2015, which were both featured on the New Level Unlocked Album. The album was released on 25 March 2016, under DJ Frass Records, going on to top the Billboard Reggae Albums Charts in April which stood for 18 weeks, making him the first dancehall deejay to have a number one album on the charts in five years. New Level Unlocked was selected at number 3 in Billboard's "10 Best Reggae Albums of 2016". He also had multiple hit singles that year with "Formula", "My Side of The Story", "Block and Delete", "After All", "12 PM (Living Good)", "Spoil You", "Extra Lesson" and "Badness It Name". In September 2016 he was nominated for a MOBO Award for the second time in the Best Reggae Act category. His "Champion Boy" single was used in an advertising campaign for the Red Stripe Premier League. With the crew's name Vendetta which he uses to categorize his fans, made the launch of a clothing line considered as Detta Gear. He was also featured on a remix of Shaggy's "That Love" on 11 November 2016.

=== 2017–2018: New Rules ===
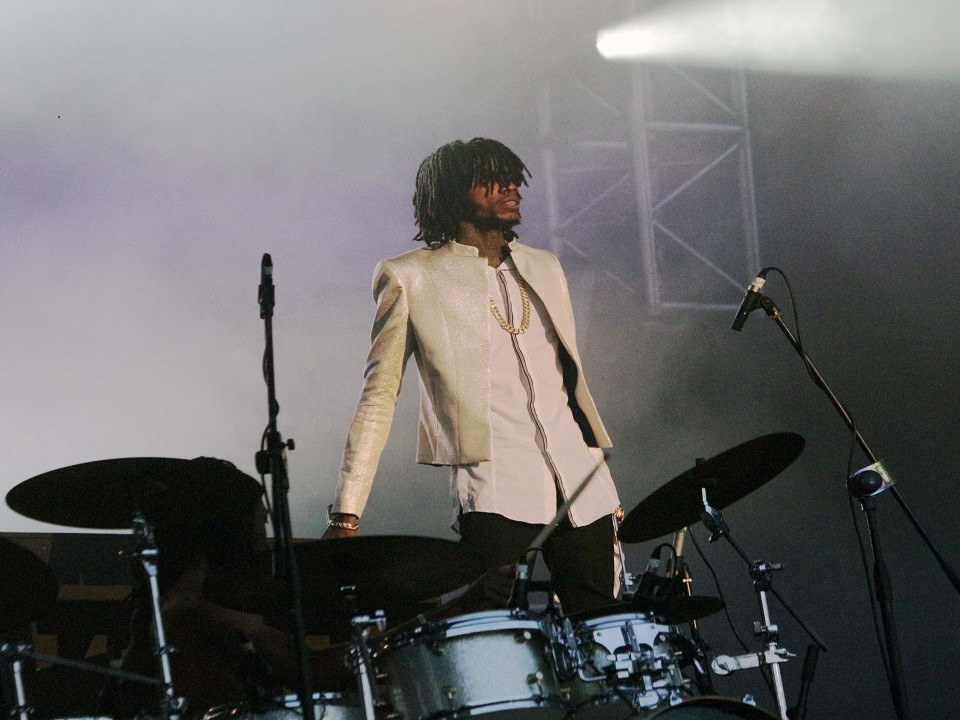
Alkaline performing at Reggae Sumfest in 2017.

Alkaline was considered one of the young hot acts in the dancehall space, not only because of his extreme talent but his huge controversial relevancy. For a certain period of time, he was very distant from Jamaica focusing more on the international scene. Over time there were critics claiming that he switched up on Jamaica given the fact that he didn't perform for a long time in his home country.

After his album tour, on 25 March 2017, Alkaline launched his own show called New Rules Festival which he brought to his home country. It featured artists like Mavado, Shaggy, I-Octane, Tarrus Riley, Jahmiel and many more at Jamaica's national stadium car park. It boasted one of the biggest turnouts on a Jamaican stage show and many attendees would go on to say "New Rules" was one of dancehall's greatest shows ever and would definitely go down in history.

In July of that year, Alkaline attended Jamaica's Biggest annual stage show, Reggae Sumfest at which he hadn't performed since 2014; making a huge come back as one of the main performers as he featured the legendary Dean Fraser.

On 10 August 2018 Alkaline made an appearance on FOX 5 News New York promoting the 13th annual Caribbean concert as the headline act interviewed by morning host Rosanna Scotto. The performance was held in Jackson, New Jersey at Six Flags Great Adventure amusement park 12 August 2018.

On 8 September 2018, Alkaline brought his second New Rules show to Queens, New York, in Amazura.

=== 2019–2022: Top Prize, Givenchy Feature, New Rules Festival's and The Ripple EFFX ===
In early December Alkaline's 2019 single "With the Thing" was featured on the Video game Grand Theft Auto V with the "iFruit Radio" soundtrack. He made his first appearance on the Afro Nation festival in Accra, Ghana 30 December 2019.

On 12 February 2021, Alkaline announced his second studio album Top Prize. With the announcement of his sophomore album, he made an appearance on Audiomack making him the first Jamaican dancehall artist to be featured on the Fine Tuned series. The album was published on 14 May 2021, with the lead single "Ocean Wave" which was published on 6 March 2020. After the first week the album peaked at No. 2 on the Billboard’s Reggae Albums Charts, No. 19 on the Heatseekers Charts for sale ranks and No. 56 on Top Current Album Sales which gained him a spot at No. 37 on Billboard's Emerging Artists that seeks to highlight the top performing and rising acts.

On 27 March 2022, Alkaline headlined his third New Rules Festival at the Miramar Regional Amphitheater in Miami, Florida, with featuring acts like Mavado, Kranium and Wayne Wonder.

On 22 June 2022, Alkaline had his music featured on Givenchy's Men's Spring Summer 2023 RTW Show in Paris, France, which was directed by fashion designer Matthew M. Williams. In the same year on 2 July 2022, Alkaline returned his New Rules Festival to Kingston, Jamaica at the national stadium car park featuring performances from Macka Diamond, Aidonia, Skeng and many more.

His fifth EP The Ripple EFFX was released on 9 December 2022 and went on to win EP of the Year at the very first annual Caribbean Music Awards on 31 August 2023.

=== 2023–2025: Givenchy Campaign, New Rules Festival's ===
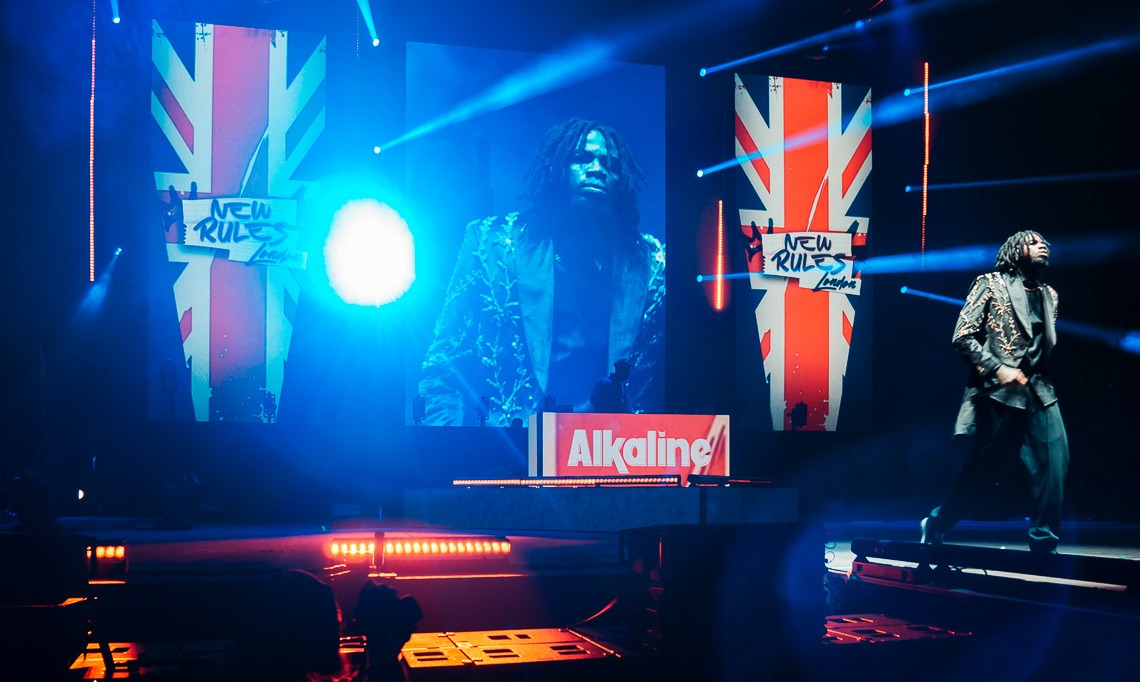
Alkaline performing in 2025 at Wembley Arena.

On 9 January 2023, Alkaline was partnered on Givenchy's spring-summer 2023 men's global advertising campaign wearing the latest collection with photography from Matthew M. Williams. It was announced that Alkaline will serve as the face of the SS23 campaign.

The fifth staging of the New Rules Festival returned to New York in the city of Mount Vernon on 3 September 2023, with featured performing acts like Mavado, Charly Black, Skinny Fabulous and Libianca.

Alkaline attended his first show in the year of 2025 in Boston, Massachusetts on 30 March where he was awarded by Liz Miranda, a representative of the State Senate honoring him with a citation in contributions to Jamaican music and culture while recognizing his global influence within the Dancehall genre.

While concluding an eight-year hiatus, Alkaline held the sixth staging of his New Rules Festival in the United Kingdom, London making its debut in the country at Wembley Arena on April 17, 2025. The show featured young dancehall acts such as Rajahwild and Armanii with a surprise performance by the West London collective group WSTRN.

The seventh staging of his New Rules Festival made its debut in Toronto, Canada on 21 June 2025 at the Rebel Entertainment complex. The eighth staging of New Rules Festival made its way back to Jamaica for the third time in the Trelawny Parish at the Trelawny Multi-purpose stadium on July 5, 2025.

=== 2026–present: New Rules Festival's, NPT ===
Alkaline brought the ninth staging of New Rules Festival in collaboration with Reggae Fest to the Barclays Center in Brooklyn on March 21, 2026, headlining his first-ever U.S. solo arena show and making history as the youngest Dancehall artist to sell out an arena at age 32. The night was further marked by a special honor, as Brian Cunningham of the 43rd Assembly District presented him with the key to Flatbush.

On March 23, 2026, Alkaline released his third studio album, NPT, which peaked at No. 10 on the Billboard Reggae Albums Charts.

== Philanthropy ==
In May 2014, Alkaline donated $200,000 JMD each to two financially impoverished female cancer patients in Jamaica to further progress their treatments from the tumorous disease.

In March 2020 During the COVID-19 pandemic, Alkaline and New Era Productions team donated cleaning agents and disinfectant to the Maxfield Park Children's Home in Kingston, Jamaica.

On 23 June 2022 Alkaline and New Era Productions donated $1 million JMD to the Jamaica Society for the blind at the media launch for the second staging of the New Rules Festival in Kingston, Jamaica.

On 24 June 2025 Alkaline and his New Era Production team partnered with the Ministry of Agriculture and Fisheries to create a workshop with the Jamaica 4-H Clubs in Trelawny attracting more young people to agriculture and making an innovative approach to youth engagement.

In December 2025 Earlan assembled the Alkaline Foundation with the pursuit to help Hurricane Melissa victims with relief packages in the parishes of Westmoreland and Trelawny.

== Controversies ==
=== Scleral tattooing ===
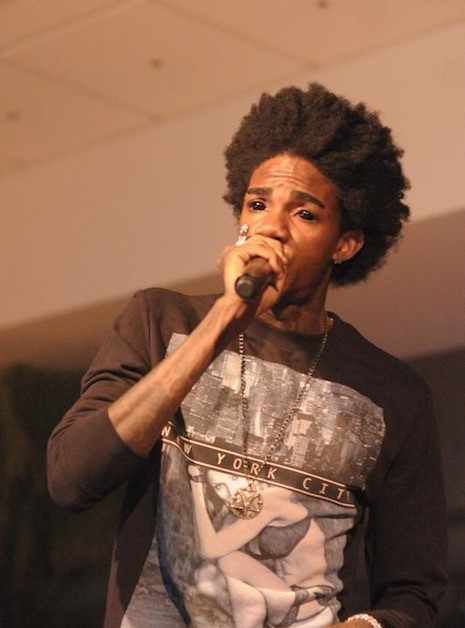
Alkaline in 2014 performing live at the Grugahalle arena in Essen, Germany.

When Alkaline first appeared on the Jamaican dancehall scene in 2013 he became known for his distinctive look and style, with the bleached skin and blond dreadlocks but the most controversial was his alleged tattooed eyes, which prompted others to follow suit. He caused quite the stir as he claimed to have Scleral tattooing in his eyeballs. Lauded as a publicity stunt by the Jamaican public, Alkaline received much backlash for the controversial move but also gained a heavy music following. An ongoing theme in much of his breakout music was the year "2016", which generated much intrigue as he never explicitly stated the year's meaning or significance. He would keep up the charade for about 3 years, until he finally revealed the "tattoos" to be nothing more than lenses. As the Jamaican public ushered in the year of 2016, this prompted the release of his debut album, New Level Unlocked. He has since halted wearing the black scleral lens that would cover his cornea.

On May 14, 2025, Alkaline made an appearance on BET UK for an interview, appearing back on scene with his infamous scleral lenses which he hasn't worn for a decade, once again creating a controversial buzz in the media. In a sit-down interview with Nationwide 90FM on July 2, 2025, He explained that the image was made for public relations and an expression of himself as an entertainer.

== Discography ==
=== Albums ===
List of studio albums, with selected details and chart positions
| Title | Details | Peak chart positions | | |
| Title | Details | US Reggae | US Heat. | US Sale. |
|---|---|---|---|---|
| New Level Unlocked | Released: 25 March 2016; Label: DJ Frass Records; Formats: CD, digital download, Streaming | 1 | — | — |
| Top Prize | Released: 14 May 2021; Label: Autobamb Records; Formats: CD, digital download, streaming | 2 | 19 | 56 |
| NPT | Released: 23 March 2026; Label: Autobamb Records; Formats: CD, digital download, streaming | 10 | — | — |
"—" denotes a recording that did not chart or was not released in that territory.

=== Mixtapes ===
| Title | Mixtape details |
|---|---|
| Mixtape | Released: 29 July 2014; Format: Digital download, CD; Label: Tad's Record |
| Raw as Eva | Released: 6 August 2014; Format: Digital download, streaming; Label: Notnice Records |
| Showcase | Released: 20 January 2015; Format: Digital download, streaming; Label: Tad's Record |

=== EPs ===
| Title | EP details |
|---|---|
| 123 EP | Released: 25 February 2014; Format: Digital download, streaming; Label: Tad's Record |
| Gone Away - EP | Released: 1 April 2014; Format: Digital download, streaming; Label: Tad's Record |
| F*ck You | Released: 8 July 2014; Format: Digital download, streaming; Label: Tad's Record |
| Ride or Die | Released: 20 January 2015; Format: Digital download, streaming; Label: DJ Frass Records |
| The Ripple EFFX - EP | Released: 9 December 2022; Format: Digital download, streaming; Label: Autobamb Records |

=== As featured artist ===
List of singles as featured artist, with selected certifications, showing year released and album name
| Year | Single | Album | Certifications | | |
|---|---|---|---|---|---|
| Year | Single | Album | 2014 | "Press Play" (Remix) (Rkade ft. Beenie Man & Alkaline) | Non-album singles |
| 2016 | "That Love" (Remix) (Shaggy ft. Alkaline) | | | | Non-album singles |
| 2017 | "Formula" (Remix) (French Montana ft. Alkaline) | Jungle Rules | | | |
| 2017 | "Txtin’" (WSTRN ft. Alkaline) | Non-album single | BPI: Silver | | |
| 2018 | "Nonchalant" (A Boogie wit da Hoodie ft. Alkaline) | International Artist | | | |
| 2018 | "Fuego" (Keith Sweat ft. Roi Chip Anthony, Ray Fade, Alkaline & Akon) | Playing For Keeps | | | |
| 2018 | "My Girl Remix" (Chip ft. Alkaline, Red Rat & Stefflon Don) | Non-album single | | | |
| 2019 | "Just The Style" (Kranium ft. Alkaline) | Midnight Sparks | | | |
| 2019 | "Rich N Comfortable" (Star Captyn ft. Alkaline) | Non-album singles | | | |
| 2020 | "Incognito" (Stalk Ashley ft. Alkaline) | Non-album singles | | | |

=== As lead artist ===
List of singles as lead artist, showing year released and album name
| Year | Single | Album | | | |
|---|---|---|---|---|---|
| Year | Single | Album | 2013 | "Only Thing Mi Want" (with Spice) | Non-album singles |
| 2014 | "Gyal Bruk Out (Remix)" (Featuring Japanese) | | | | Non-album singles |
| 2014 | "Love Doctor" (with Anju Blaxx) | | | | Non-album singles |
| 2014 | "Queng Dem" (with Anju Blaxx) | | | | Non-album singles |
| 2015 | "Ride on Me (Remix)" (Featuring Sean Kingston) | | | | Non-album singles |
| 2015 | "Above Dem" (with Mavado & I-Octane) | | | | Non-album singles |
| 2015 | "More Than Happy" (with Anju Blaxx) | | | | Non-album singles |
| 2015 | "Nice Suh" (with Anju Blaxx) | | | | Non-album singles |
| 2016 | "Company" (with Anju Blaxx) | | | | Non-album singles |
| 2016 | "ATM (Remix)" (Featuring Shatta Wale) | | | | Non-album singles |
| 2016 | "Farewell" (with Mavado) | | | | Non-album singles |
| 2017 | "Gyalis Pro" (with Sean Paul) | | | | Non-album singles |
| 2017 | "Extra Lesson (Remix)" (Featuring Chip & Kojo Funds) | | | | Non-album singles |
| 2018 | "Mamacita" (Featuring Justin Quiles) | Road to Success | | | |
| 2018 | "Fine Whine" (with Black Shadow) | Non-album singles | | | |
| 2018 | "Black Heart" (with Black Shadow) | Non-album singles | | | |
| 2019 | "Eva High" (with Black Shadow) | Non-album singles | | | |
| 2019 | "Fulla Vibez" (with Black Shadow) | Non-album singles | | | |
| 2019 | "No Negative Vibes" (with Walshy Fire & Runtown) | Walshy Fire Presents: ABENG | | | |
| 2019 | "Jealousy" (with Mavado & Jahmiel) | Non-album singles | | | |
| 2020 | "Riches" (Featuring Knaxx, Sashie Cool & Star Captyn) | Non-album singles | | | |
| 2020 | "Gladdest Night" (with Black Shadow) | Non-album singles | | | |
| 2020 | "Overseas" (with Serena Rigacci) (Featuring Famous Dex) | Non-album singles | | | |
| 2022 | "Static" (with Black Shadow) | Non-album singles | | | |
| 2022 | "Profile" (with Black Shadow) | Non-album singles | | | |
| 2023 | "First Touch" (with Black Shadow) | Non-album singles | | | |
| 2024 | "Wul Mine" (with Knaxx) | Non-album singles | | | |
| 2025 | "My Choice" (with Di Genius) | Non-album singles | | | |
| 2025 | "Millions" (with Intence) | Non-album singles | | | |
| 2026 | "Elevate" (with Knaxx & Sortie) | Non-album singles | | | |

== Awards and nominations ==
| Year | Award | Category | Nominated work | Result | Ref. |
|---|---|---|---|---|---|
| 2014 | MOBO Awards | Best Reggae Act | Himself | Nominated | |
| 2016 | 21st Hapilos Digital Music Awards | Song of The Year | "On Fleek (Love Yuh Everything)" | Won | |
| 2016 | MOBO Awards | Best Reggae Act | Himself | Nominated | |
| 2017 | 21st Hapilos Digital Music Awards | Top Male Artist | Himself | Won | |
| 2017 | 21st Hapilos Digital Music Awards | Most Streamed Artist | Himself | Won | |
| 2017 | 21st Hapilos Digital Music Awards | Most Downloaded Artist | Himself | Won | |
| 2017 | 21st Hapilos Digital Music Awards | Most Streamed Single | "Afterall" | Won | |
| 2017 | MOBO Awards | Best Reggae Act | Himself | Nominated | |
| 2018 | International Reggae and World Music Awards | Entertainer of the Year | Himself | Won | |
| 2018 | International Reggae and World Music Awards | Best Song | "Afterall" | Won | |
| 2018 | International Reggae and World Music Awards | Best Male Dancehall Artist | Himself | Won | |
| 2023 | International Reggae and World Music Awards | Best EP | The Ripple EFFX - EP | Won | |
| 2023 | Caribbean Music Awards | EP of the Year (Dancehall) | The Ripple EFFX - EP | Won | |
| 2024 | Caribbean Music Awards | Video of the Year (Dancehall) | "Boss" | Nominated | |
| 2026 | Caribbean Music Awards | People's Choice | Himself | Won | |
| 2026 | Caribbean Music Awards | Male Dancehall Artist of the Year | Himself | Nominated | |
