= London Hill =

American rapper

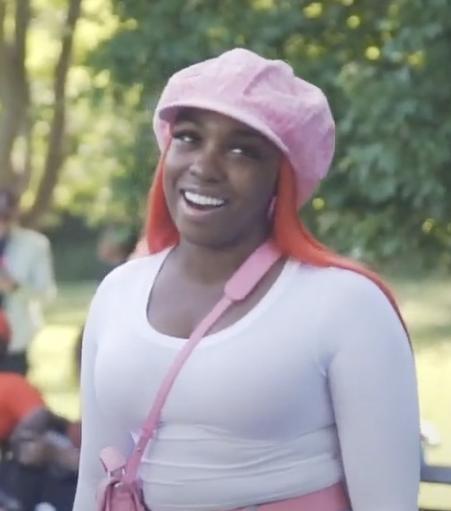

Background information
- Born: Juliana Jonhope
- Origin: The Bronx, New York
- Occupations: Rapper; songwriter
- Label: Heavy On It Records

Juliana Jonhope, known professionally as London Hill, is an American rapper. She is signed to Nicki Minaj's imprint under Republic Records.

== Career ==
In January 2022, she appeared on On The Radar Radio alongside Lola Brooke, K Goddess, Connie Diiamond, Billy B, Pretty Dij & Big Zen. In March 2023, Hill signed with Nicki Minaj's imprint under Republic Records, Heavy On It Records. Hill mentions influence from Foxy Brown (rapper), Nicki Minaj, Kelis, Shenseea, Cardi B & Roddy Rich.

== Personal life ==
London Hill was born and raised in The Bronx, New York. She has one son.

== Discography ==
All credits are adapted from Spotify and Apple Music.

=== Singles ===
==== As lead artist ====
Year	Title	Album	Writer(s)	Producer(s)
2024	"High Demand"	Non-album singles	Juliana Jonhope	Mizzy
2023	"London Drill"	Non-album singles	Juliana Jonhope	Kent M Edmonston Jr, Gregorio Ford
2022	"Who"	Non-album singles	Juliana Jonhope	Billionaire Beatz
2022	"Gassed Up"	Non-album singles	Juliana Jonhope	Billionaire Beatz
2022	"Flexer"	Non-album singles	Juliana Jonhope	Billionaire Beatz
2021	"No Hook"	Non-album singles	Juliana Jonhope	Billionaire Beatz
2021	"Respect" (featuring LGP QUA)	Non-album singles	Juliana Jonhope, Qidere Johnson	Billionaire Beatz
2021	"Pressure" (featuring Sosa Geek)	Non-album singles	Juliana Jonhope, J Madison	Billionaire Beatz
2020	"Wah Do Dem"	Non-album singles	Juliana Jonhope	Billionaire Beatz
2020	"Box"	Non-album singles	Juliana Jonhope	Billionaire Beatz
2019	"Treesh"	Non-album singles	Juliana Jonhope	Billionaire Beatz
2019	"Kitty"	Non-album singles	Juliana Jonhope	London Hill

==== As featured artist ====
Year	Title	Album	Writer(s)	Producer(s)
2025	"Beauty School Dropout" (Shontelle Sparkles featuring London Hill)	Butterfly Effect (Deluxe Edition)	Drew Louis, Jayelle, Juliana Jonhope, Shawn Davis Berger	Drew Louis
2025	"Shark Boots" (Ziico Niico featuring London Hill)	F*** Drill	Nico Burrell	Nico Burrell
2024	"Rotation" (Monét X Change featuring London Hill)	Grey Rainbow, Vol. 1	Alexander Nalpantidis, Cannon Mapp, Eritza Laues, Juliana Jonhope, Kevin Akeem Bertin	Alx Stefano, Eritza Laues, Cannon Mapp, Monét X Change
2023	"High Mileage" (J.B. Santiago and London Hill)	Provocative	Jamel Brown	4L Hundo
2022	"Likkle Miss (The Fine Nine Remix)" (Nicki Minaj, Skeng, Spice, Destra, Patrice Roberts, Lady Leshurr, Pamputtae, Dovey Magnum, Lisa Mercedez, and London Hill)	Queen Radio: Volume 1	Annette Lawrence, Destra, Emelio Lynch, Eveana Shacara, Henry, Grace Latoya Hamilton, Juliana Jonhope, Kevon Douglas, Kevon Hart, Kory Hart, Melesha O'Garro, Onika Maraj, Patrice Roberts, Rowan Melhado, Sebastian Loers, Simsky Kimberly Harrison	Droptop Records, Ditruth Records
2020	"Ride for Me" (Troyy Boii 6 Bloc and London Hill)	4 the Luv of the Street (Vol. 1)	Troy Rayon Chaplain	No producer credited
