= Spice (musician) =

Jamaican dancehall musician (born 1982)

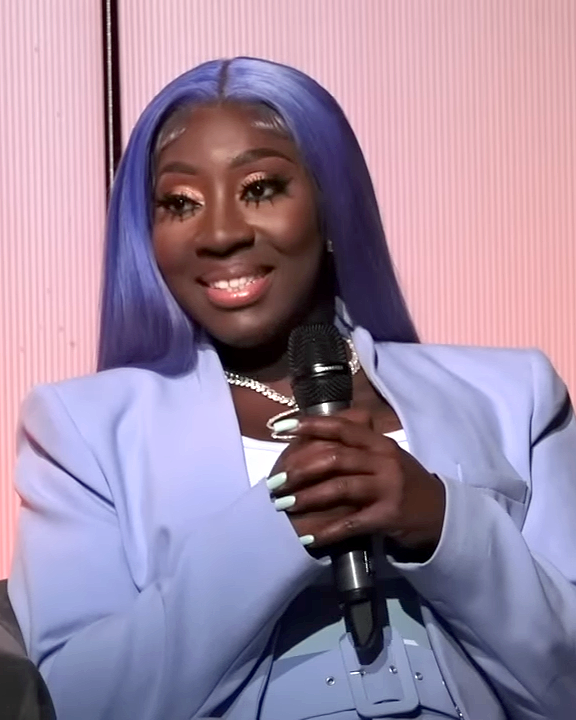
- Spice in 2023
- Born: Grace Latoya Hamilton; 6 August 1982 (age 44); Portmore, Jamaica
- Education: Edna Manley College of the Visual and Performing Arts
- Occupations: Deejay; singer; songwriter
- Years active: 1999–present
- Partners: Nicholas Lall (2006–2016; ex-fiancé); Justin Budd (2020–2022)
- Children: 2
- Musical career
- Genres: Dancehall; reggae fusion; reggae
- Instrument: Vocals
- Labels: VP; Spice Official
- Website: spiceofficial.com

Grace Latoya Hamilton (born 6 August 1982), known professionally as Spice, is a Jamaican dancehall recording artist, singer, and songwriter. Known as the "Queen of Dancehall" and credited as one of the most influential female Jamaican artists of all time, she is recognised globally as one of the most prominent dancehall artists in the world. Known for her aggressive flow, musical versatility and outspoken lyrics, Spice first gained recognition after performing at the annual Sting festival in 2000. She released her first single "Complain" for record producer Dave Kelly's Madhouse Records in 2003. She continued to release singles through the 2000s and was even featured on songs with Jimmy Cliff and Beenie Man.

Spice had her first major success with the controversial single "Romping Shop" with Vybz Kartel in 2009. She released her self-titled debut EP (2009). She subsequently signed with VP Records and released her second EP, So Mi Like It (2014), which was preceded by a single of the same name. During the 2016 MOBO Awards, Spice became the first woman dancehall artist to ever be nominated for Best Reggae Act, as well as the only woman to be nominated for the category overall. She appears as a regular cast member on VH1's reality television series Love & Hip Hop: Atlanta, which depicts her pursuit of reaching an international level in her music career and juggling her professional life with her personal life.

Spice's first full-length project, a mixtape titled Captured (2018), was released independently and debuted at number one on the Billboard Reggae Albums chart. Her long-delayed debut studio album, 10 (2021), was nominated for Best Reggae Album at the 64th Grammy Awards in 2022. Following her departure from VP, she independently released her second studio album, Emancipated (2022), under her own label, Spice Official Entertainment, from which she also released the deluxe version of her sophomore album in September 2022. Since then, she has released her second independent project Mirror 25 (2024), her third studio album.

== Early life ==
Grace Latoya Hamilton was born on 6 August 1982, in Spanish Town, Jamaica, and raised in Portmore. Her father died when she was nine years old. As a child, she used to attend her church regularly and lead the choir. Following her house burning down and a period of being homeless, she moved and spent part of her childhood living with her aunty and cousins in Finsbury Park, London, where she also attended school before returning to Jamaica. While a student at St. Catherine High School, she frequently participated in the Jamaica Cultural Development Commission (JCDC) festival in the music category and earned several medals throughout the years. Although she wanted to become a chartered accountant, she decided to pursue a music career. Spice graduated St.Catherine High School in 2000, then enrolled at the Edna Manley College of the Visual and Performing Arts to study music and drama. She then began experimenting with dancehall music and soon after generated interest in her community and its environs with her deejaying abilities at local stage shows.

== Career ==
=== 1999–2007: Career beginnings ===
Spice was introduced by Ninjaman to perform on stage with other artists in 1999. Spice then made her debut when she was given the opportunity to perform at the annual dancehall festival Sting in 2000. It was her first major appearance on a stage show, where she earned several encores from the crowd. During this early stage of her career, Spice went on to gain a reputation for her performing abilities, despite not having a hit record.

While on tour in the UK, Spice earned the attention of Baby Cham, who later introduced her to renowned record producer Dave Kelly. From there, she released her first single for Kelly's Madhouse Records label entitled "Complain", then followed by her singles on the Bad Gal riddim, "Right There" with Toi, and "Hype". At that time, she was featured on Jimmy Cliff's "I Want I Do I Get" from his album Black Magic (2004) and on Beenie Man's "Hot" from his album Concept of Life (2006). For her first hit single, Spice used the popular Eighty Five riddim to create "Fight Over Man", which was released in 2005 and became popular in the dancehall scene. In 2007, she went on a hiatus due to the birth of her son, but soon returned to performing.

=== 2008–2012: Breakthrough and continued success ===
In late 2008, Spice collaborated with fellow dancehall artist Vybz Kartel on the single "Romping Shop", which samples "Miss Independent" by Ne-Yo. The song quickly achieved international recognition, receiving immense rotation on mainstream urban stations in the US. "Romping Shop" spent 15 weeks on the Billboard Hot R&B/Hip-Hop Songs chart, peaking at number 76. Shortly after its release, the song was banned by the Jamaica Broadcasting Corporation due to its explicit lyrical content. "Ramping Shop" was ranked number 9 on both Pitchfork's list of the 50 Best Dancehall Songs of All Time and Billboard's 12 Best Dancehall & Reggaeton Choruses of the 21st Century.

In July 2009, Spice released her self-titled debut EP on July 17, 2009, by Truck Back Records and Zojak, this EP features three songs: "Swear", "Inna Di Light", and "Whoa". She signed a recording contract with VP Records. In 2010, she released the song "Jim Screechie". In 2011, she released a remix for her single "Fun" featuring American rapper Missy Elliott and collaborated with Mýa on the single "Take Him Out" from Mýa's sixth studio album K.I.S.S. (Keep It Sexy & Simple). Spice went on to perform the song with Mýa during that year's annual Reggae Sumfest. A music video for "Take Him Out", directed by Ras Kassa, was released in 2012.

=== 2013–2016: So Mi Like It and growing popularity ===
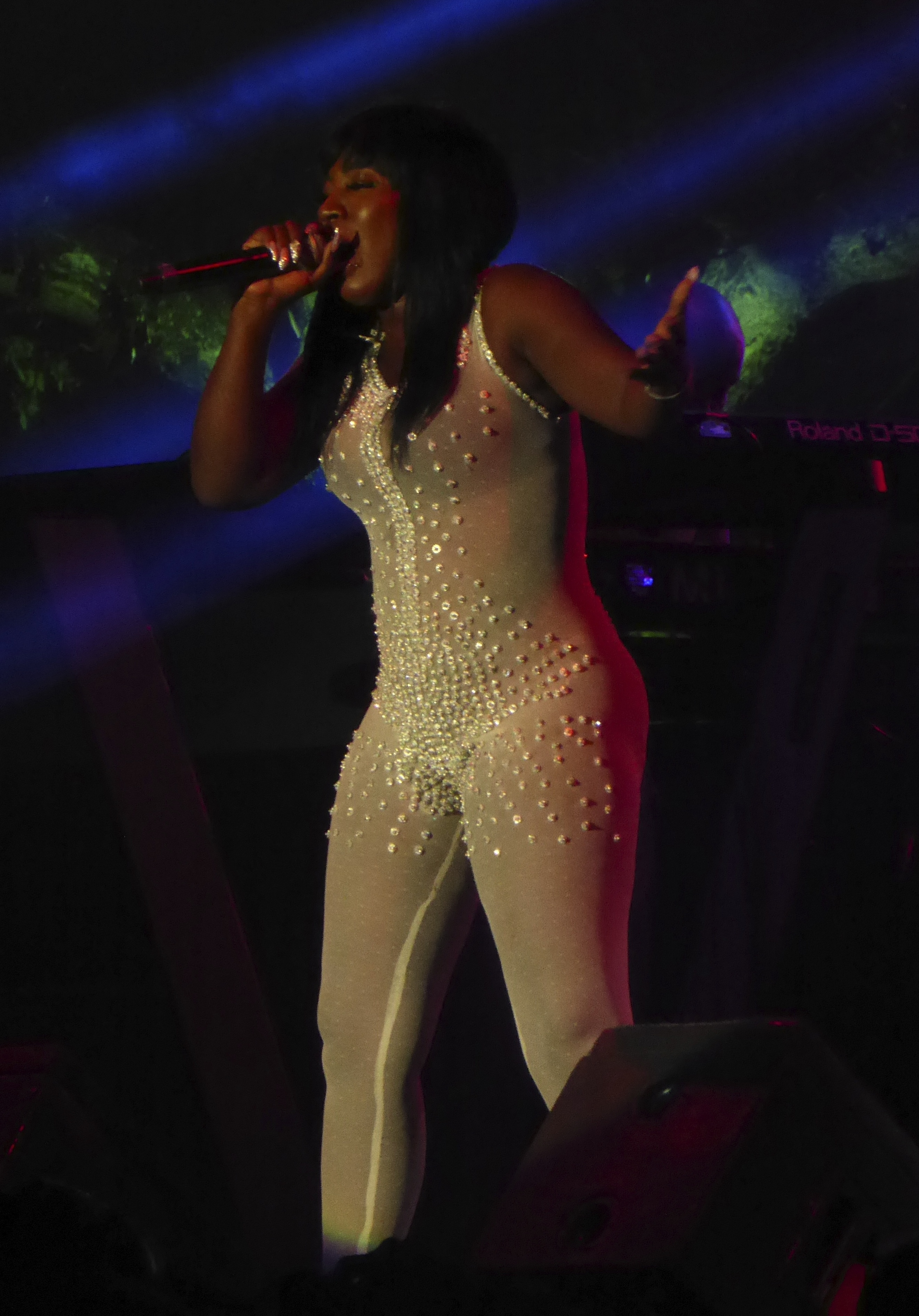
Spice performing at Reggae Sumfest 2013

In April 2013, Spice released her first project as a producer, the Gal Click riddim, featuring some of her fellow female dancehall artists. In September, she collaborated with dancehall artist Alkaline on the single "Only Ting Mi Want". She gained further recognition with her single "So Mi Like It", which was released later that year. The accompanying music video, released in January 2014, became the most viewed music video by a female Jamaican artist on YouTube, having over 129 million views as of February 2025. A remix of "So Mi Like It" featuring rapper Busta Rhymes was later released on his mixtape Catastrophic 2 in March.

Spice starred as Candy in her first theatrical feature film, Destiny, which was released on 2 April 2014. She also recorded the single "No Push Over" for the film's soundtrack. Her second EP, So Mi Like It, named after the single of the same name, was released on 2 December 2014. It debuted at number 14 on the Billboard Top Reggae Albums chart. The EP features five songs, including "So Mi Like It", "Like A Man" and "Conjugal Visit" (featuring Vybz Kartel). The music video for "Conjugal Visit" garnered over 2 million views on WorldStarHipHop within one day, and as of 2023, has surpassed 100 million views. The same month, she was featured along with soca artist Bunji Garlin on rapper ASAP Ferg's song "Jolly" from his mixtape Ferg Forever.

In May 2015, Spice released "Needle Eye", a song inspired by Shabba Ranks's 1987 song of the same name. In May 2016, she was featured alongside Jeremih on Kid Ink's single "Nasty". The following month, she released the single "Indicator", based on a dance move of the same name. For 2016's Red Bull Culture Clash, she joined forces with Mixpak and won the clash over Wiz Khalifa & Taylor Gang and others. At the MOBO Awards, Spice was the only woman nominated for Best Reggae Act and the first female dancehall artist ever nominated in this category.

=== 2017–2019: Love & Hip Hop: Atlanta and Captured ===
In April 2017, Spice released the single "Sheet". In June, she appeared on a remix of Jax Jones's "You Don't Know Me". In August, she was featured alongside Sean Kingston and Lady Leshurr on Charlie Sloth's "I Can Do" from his album The Plug. After making a guest appearance in season six of VH1's reality TV series Love & Hip Hop: Atlanta, Spice joined the show as a regular cast member in season seven and was promoted to main cast in Season 8.

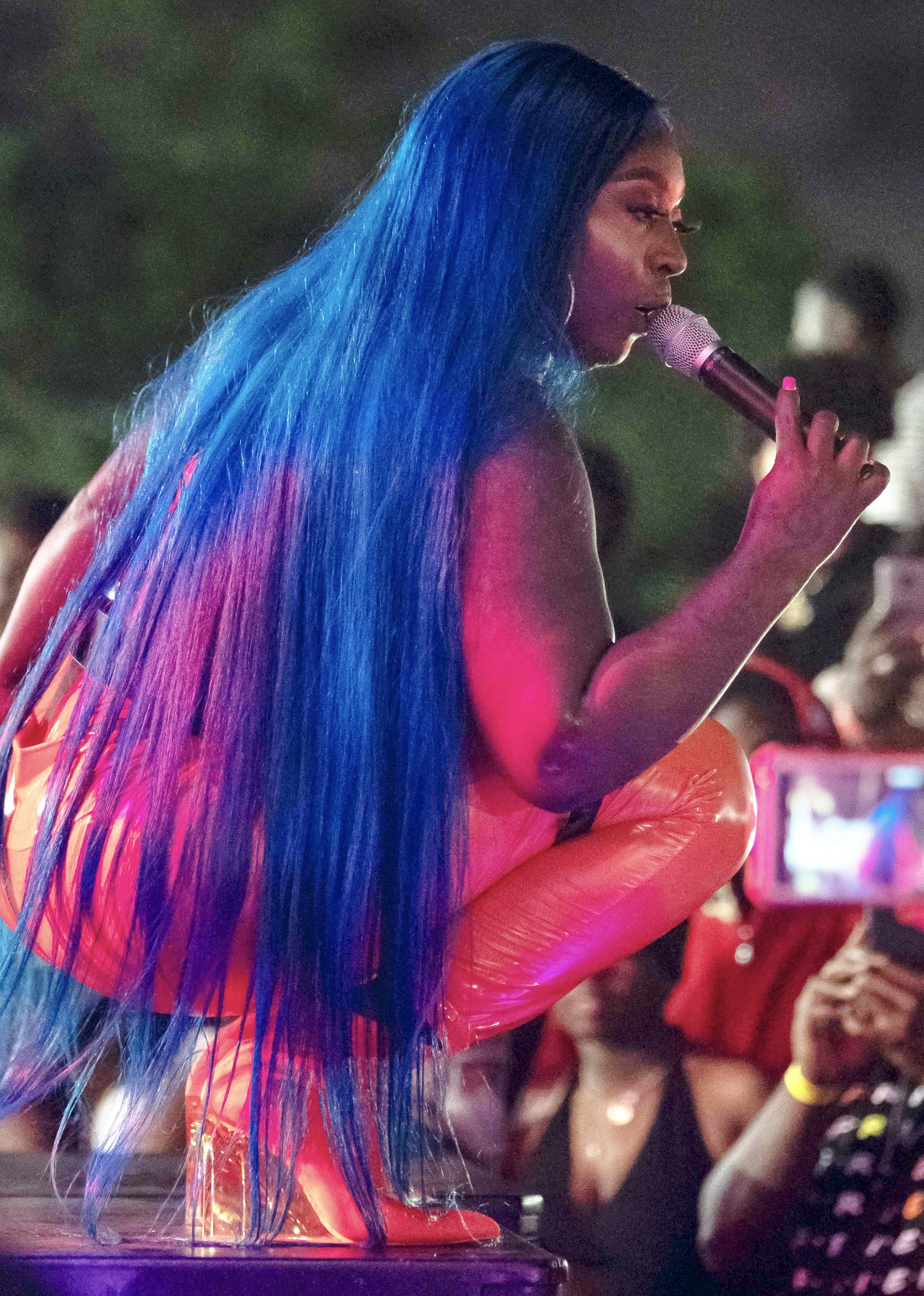
Spice performing in 2019

After a brief social media hiatus, Spice posted a picture of herself with dramatically light skin on Instagram on 22 October 2018. The picture went viral, leading many to assume she had whitened her skin. She eventually admitted to the stunt, whitening her skin to raise awareness about the issue of colorism within the black community. Spice addressed the issue in her single "Black Hypocrisy", which was released the next day along with an accompanying music video. Serving as the lead single for her debut mixtape, "Black Hypocrisy" debuted at number one on the Billboard Reggae Digital Song Sales chart.

Spice's debut mixtape, Captured, was released on 2 November 2018 under her own independent record label Spice Official Entertainment. The mixtape was released following a legal dispute with her record label over the release of her long-delayed debut album. Captured debuted at number one on the Billboard Reggae Albums chart. Besides "Black Hypocrisy", several tracks from the project such as "Romantic Mood", "Cool It" and "Genie", were also highlighted with accompanying music videos uploaded to her YouTube channel.

In May 2019, Spice joined Vybz Kartel for the single "Back Way" and appeared alongside a doppelganger of the then-imprisoned dancehall artist in the accompanying music video. In October, she appeared with Sean Paul on the remix of Stylo G's "Dumpling", which peaked at number three on the Billboard Reggae Digital Song Sales chart. The same month, she released the single "Tables Turn" with an accompanying music video on YouTube. In November, she was featured on Krept and Konan's track "First Time" alongside Tory Lanez. "First Time" became her first entry on the UK Singles Chart, where it debuted at number 63.

=== 2020–2022: 10 and Emancipated ===
In March 2020, Spice announced the release of her debut studio album, which was executively produced by Shaggy. Its lead single, "Frenz", was released to streaming platforms on 18 December 2020. "Go Down Deh", featuring Shaggy and Sean Paul, was released as the album's second lead single on 30 April 2021. Its accompanying music video quickly amassed millions of views, the song becoming a success on streaming platforms. "Go Down Deh" was ranked number 48 on NPR Music's list of the 100 Best Songs of 2021. It also made her the first female Jamaican dancehall artist to have a Platinum certification in Canada, with the song getting Platinum Single certification on 6 February 2024. With the song's success, Spice performed with Sean Paul and Shaggy on Good Morning America, The Wendy Williams Show and Jimmy Kimmel Live! Spice's debut studio album, 10, was eventually released on 6 August 2021, debuting at number six on the Billboard Reggae Albums chart. It was nominated for Best Reggae Album at the 64th Grammy Awards in 2022.

In November 2021, Shaggy confirmed Spice's departure from VP Records. Following that, she announced the release of her second studio album, Emancipated. Its lead single, "Clap Clap", was released in July 2022. In August, Spice shared via Twitter a short snippet of the uncensored music video for "Tape Measure", the album's second single, which quickly went viral for its graphic visuals. Emancipated was released on 26 August 2022, debuting at number seven on the Billboard Reggae Albums chart. A deluxe edition was released in 2023. The same month, she was featured alongside Capella Grey on Karlie Redd's song "Werk", and on Stefflon Don's "Clockwork". In September, she collaborated with Yemi Alade on the single "Bubble It". In October, she appeared on Skeng and Nicki Minaj's second remix of Skeng's single "Likkle Miss" called "The Fine Nine Remix" on which she was featured alongside Destra Garcia, Pamputtae, Lisa Mercedez, London Hill, Lady Leshurr, Patrice Roberts and Dovey Magnum.

=== 2023–present: Health scare and Mirror 25 ===
Following a health scare in November, Spice returned to social media and on 14 March 2023, she posted pictures on her Twitter and Instagram depicting pregnancy, which quickly went viral in the next few hours. Rumors had circulated online for days regarding whether she was pregnant until the release of her song "God a Bless Me" on 17 March, and the accompanying music video in which she celebrated her "rebirth" after her hiatus. Spice took to Instagram Live later that day and broke down the full story of her ordeal, speaking on her weight loss, four surgeries, relearning to talk, walk and sing and briefly dying during a surgery in the Dominican Republic. A week after releasing "God a Bless Me", Spice released a gospel-reggae track "Spice Marley" and its accompanying music video to YouTube, paying tribute to her late father, Anthony Hamilton, who died in her youth. Spice made her long-anticipated return to stage following her six-month hiatus, taking the stage at the Start Di Fun Music Festival in the Cayman Islands.

On 5 May 2023, Tamarac's Vice Mayor Marlon awarded Spice the Key to the Region of Florida in recognition of her work in music. At the 2023 BET Awards, she participated in a tribute performance for Lifetime Achievement Award recipient Busta Rhymes alongside fellow Jamaican artists Skillibeng and Dexta Daps. "Clap Clap", the lead single of Spice's 2022 album Emancipated, was featured in the premiere episode of the Netflix original series Survival of the Thickest, "Keep Your Plants Watered, Bitch", which aired on 13 July 2023.

Spice became the center of controversy when the Love & Hip Hop: Atlanta episode "Mena-ce to Society" aired in August. During a verbal altercation with co-star Erica Mena, Spice made comments on Mena's parenting and mentioned her son. Mena responded violently, flipping a table and attacking Spice. While leaving the establishment, Mena called Spice a "blue monkey" and insisted she should have died in surgery. The scene quickly went viral and ultimately resulted in Mena's removal from the show in September.

Spice was featured on the single "Wow" on Masicka's second studio album Generation of Kings in December 2023.

In August 2024, Spice released her third studio album Mirror 25 via her own label, Spice Official Entertainment, under license to Empire Distribution. The album features guest appearances from Ky-Mani Marley, Busta Rhymes, Lola Brooke, Patoranking, Jada Kingdom, Pamputtae and Chronic Law Its lead single "Intro" features cameo voiceovers from Bounty Killer, Nicki Minaj and Vybz Kartel among others. Spice released four singles leading up to the album's release: "2085 Tea", "Round Round" with Busta Rhymes, "Gangster" with Chronic Law and "Ex Boyfriend".

In 2025, Spice was one of the headliners of Boomtown Fair.

== Business venture ==
In 2009, Spice launched her clothing boutique chain Spicey Couture in Jamaica. The chain had branches in Kingston, May Pen and Montego Bay. As of 2020, the chain is no longer active.

In 2010, Spice opened a beauty salon called Spicey Salon in Kingston. She also opened a sports bar and lounge called 8 Ball in her hometown of Portmore.

In May 2019, Spice launched Faces & Laces, an online beauty store that initially offered a line of wigs. Later that year, cosmetic products were added to the beauty line. As of 2024, the Faces & Laces website URL redirects to the Graci Noir homepage.

In October 2020, Spice launched her clothing line called Graci Noir. Some of the website's cosmetic products still carry the Faces & Laces name.

== Philanthropy ==
In 2016, Spice launched a back-to-school sponsorship competition via Instagram. Fans were asked to remix one of Spice's songs in an educational way for a chance to earn an all-expense-paid scholarship. The scholarship included fully paid tuition, a fully covered book list, uniforms, and school supplies. The winner was selected based on the highest number of likes for the remix.

In 2018, Spice founded the Grace Hamilton Women Empowerment Foundation (GHWEF), which aims to enrich women through education, business, and entrepreneurship. In August 2019, Spice hosted a back-to-school giveaway in Kingston through the foundation, providing school supplies to more than 500 children.

== Personal life ==
In 2009, Spice became engaged to her boyfriend Nicholas Lall, whom she had been dating since 2006. The couple called off the engagement and ended their relationship in 2016. They have two children; their son Nicholas was born in 2007, and their daughter, Nicholatoy, was born in 2011. In 2021, Nicholas was credited as a featured artist on Spice's song "Po-Po" from her debut album 10.

In 2020, Spice began dating American cinematographer Justin Budd, whom she met in Atlanta. The couple ended their relationship in 2022.

== Discography ==
Studio albums

- 10 (2021)
- Emancipated (2022)
- Mirror 25 (2024)

== Filmography ==
Films
Year	Title	Role	Notes
2014	Destiny	Candy	Film debut

Television
Year	Title	Role	Notes
2017–2026	Love & Hip Hop: Atlanta	Herself	Guest (season 6); Supporting cast (season 7); Main cast (seasons 8–13)
2020	The Bachelor Presents: Listen to Your Heart	Herself	Episode: "Week 5: Semi-Finals"
2021	Good Morning America	Musical guest	Episode: "11 June 2021"
2021	Jimmy Kimmel Live!	Musical guest	Episode: "Owen Wilson/Betty Gilpin/Spice, Sean Paul & Shaggy"
2021	The Wendy Williams Show	Musical guest	Episode: "Spice featuring Sean Paul & Shaggy/Chris Witherspoon"
2022	Wild N’ Out	Herself	Episode: "Spice/Hitman Holla"
2022–2023	VH1 Family Reunion: Love & Hip Hop Edition	Herself	Main cast (season 3)
2024	Baddies Caribbean Auditions	Herself	Judge

Web
Year	Title	Role	Notes
2019–2022	Spice It Up	Herself/host	Talk-show

== Awards and nominations ==
Organization	Year	Category	Nominated work	Result	Ref.
21st Hapilos Digital Music Awards	2016	Dancehall Single of the Year	"Needle Eye"	Won	
21st Hapilos Digital Music Awards	2017	Top Collaboration	"Indicator (Soca Remix)" (featuring Bunji Garlin)	Nominated	
21st Hapilos Digital Music Awards	2017	Top Female Artist	Herself	Won	
EME Awards	2007	Female DJ of the Year	Herself	Nominated	
EME Awards	2009	Female DJ of the Year	Herself	Won	
EME Awards	2010	Female DJ of the Year	Herself	Won	
EME Awards	2010	International Artist of the Year	Herself	Nominated	
EME Awards	2011	Female DJ of the Year	Herself	Nominated	
EME Awards	2011	Dancehall Song of the Year	"Jim Screechie"	Nominated	
Grammy Awards	2022	Best Reggae Album	10	Nominated	
International Reggae and World Music Awards	2012	Best Female DJ	Herself	Nominated	
International Reggae and World Music Awards	2014	Best Female DJ	Herself	Nominated	
International Reggae and World Music Awards	2015	Best Female DJ	Herself	Won	
International Reggae and World Music Awards	2016	Best Female DJ	Herself	Won	
International Reggae and World Music Awards	2018	Best Female DJ	Herself	Won	
International Reggae and World Music Awards	2019	Best Female DJ	Herself	Won	
International Reggae and World Music Awards	2020	Best Female DJ	Herself	Won	
International Reggae and World Music Awards	2021	Best Female DJ	Herself	Nominated	
MOBO Awards	2016	Best Reggae Act	Herself	Nominated	
MOBO Awards	2021	Best Reggae Act	Herself	Nominated	
