= List of radio stations in Jamaica =

This is a list of radio stations in Jamaica.

== FM Stations ==
Name	Frequency	Genres
Mello FM	88.1 MHz	Caribbean Music, Talk
TBC Radio 88.5	88.5 MHz	News, Talk, Gospel Music
KLAS Omega Sports & Gospel Radio	89.1 - 89.9 MHz	Sports/News/Talk/Gospel
Nationwide 90FM	90.3 MHz	News/Talk
GGFM 90.1	90.1 MHz	Religious, Gospel
NCU 91FM	91.1/ 91.3/ 91.5 MHz	Education, Wellness, News/Talk, Gospel
Gospel JA FM	91.7 - 91.9MHz	Caribbean Music, Reggae, Gospel
SLEEK Radio 93 FM	93.5 MHz	News, Talk
Radio Jamaica 94 FM	94.1- 94.7 MHz	Talk, News, Caribbean Music, Reggae Music
Fame FM	95.7 MHz	Reggae, Dancehall, Hip-Hop, Pop
StylzFm 96.1 FM	96.1 - 96.7 MHz	Music/News/Talk
Kool 97 FM	97.1 MHz	Caribbean Music
Bess 100 FM	100.5 MHz	Top 40
Love 101 FM	101.1 - 101.7 MHz	News, Talk, Gospel
Zip 103 FM	103.0 MHz	Caribbean Music/Top 40
Suncity 104.9 FM	104.9 MHz	Reggae, Dancehall, Hiphop, R&B
The Edge 105 FM	105.1 - 105.3 MHz	Hip-Hop, Reggae
Fyah 105 FM	105.7 - 105.9 MHz	Dance, Hip Hop, Reggae

== Former Stations ==
Name	Frequency	Genres	Ended	Notes
JBC Radio 1	700 kHz		1997	
RJR AM	550 kHz, 770 kHz		2009 March 30	Transitioned entirely to FM
IRIE FM	107.1/ 107.3, 107.5, 107.7/ 107.9	Reggae	2020	
Mega Jamz 98 FM	98.7 MHz	Top 40	2021	
NewsTalk 93 FM	93.7 MHz	News, Talk	2026	relaunched as SLEEK Radio 93FM
Hitz 92	92.1 MHz	Talk, Sports, Reggae Music	2026, March 16	integrated into Fame 95 FM
Power 106 FM	106.1 MHz	News/Talk	2026, March 16	integrated into Radio Jamaica 94 FM
Roots 96.1 FM	96.1 MHz	Reggae, Dancehall, Gospel, Talk	2026, July 31	

== See also ==
- Listen online radios of Jamaica
- Lists of radio stations in Africa
- Lists of radio stations in Asia
- Lists of radio stations in Europe
- Lists of radio stations in South America
- Lists of radio stations in the South Pacific and Oceania
