= Hope Gardens =

Hope Gardens may refer to:

- A housing block in Bushwick, Brooklyn
- Hope Botanical Gardens, Kingston, Jamaica
