= Undisputed (Beenie Man album) =

Studio album by Beenie Man
- Released: August 29, 2006
- Recorded: 2005–2006
- Genre: Dancehall, reggae fusion
- Label: Virgin

Beenie Man chronology
Concept of Life (2006)	Undisputed (2006)

Professional ratings
Review scores
Source	Rating
Allmusic	link

Undisputed is the eighteenth studio album by dancehall DJ Beenie Man, released on August 29, 2006.

== Track listing ==
Credits adapted from the album's liner notes.

No.	Title	Writer(s)	Producer(s)	Length
1.	"Undisputed"	Moses Davis; Troyton Rami; Hugh James; Conroy Smith; Xavier Cordova; Carl Udah	Troyton Rami	3:17
2.	"Chacka Dance"	Davis; Donovan Vendetta Bennett; Nigel Staff; Chris Kenner	Donovan Vendetta Bennett	3:30
3.	"Hmm Hmm"	Davis; Tony Kelly; Cordova; Maurice Gregory	Tony "CD" Kelly	3:34
4.	"Girls" (featuring Akon)	Davis; Kelly; Cordova; Gregory	Tony "CD" Kelly	4:03
5.	"Dutty Wine Gal" (featuring Brooke Valentine)	Davis; Scott Storch; Kanesha Brookes; Dane Johnson; Udah	Scott Storch	4:01
6.	"Jamaican Ting"	Davis; Storch; Udah	Scott Storch	4:17
7.	"Beenie Man" (featuring D'Angel)	Davis; Kelly; Udah; Gregory	Tony "CD" Kelly	3:27
8.	"Come Again"	Davis; Bennett; Udah; Kirk Ford	Donovan Vendetta Bennett	3:23
9.	"Fire" (featuring Voltio & Randy)	Davis; Julio Ramos; Giann Arias Colón; Randy Ortiz; Udah; Clyde McKenzie	DJ Giann	4:00
10.	"Heart Attack"	Davis; Johnson; Adrian Marshall	Dane "Fire Links" Johnson	2:30
11.	"Walk Out"	Davis; Marlon Cooke; Gavin Blair; Udah	Marlon "Pyrana" Cooke; Gavin Blair	3:13
12.	"My World" (featuring Lady Saw)	Davis; Lloyd James Jr.; Marion Hall; Udah	Lloyd "John John" James Jr.	5:25
13.	"Set You Free"	Davis; Dwayne Chin-Quee; Udah	Supa Dups	3:31
14.	"My Woman"	Davis; Arthur Amos	Free Willy	3:52

== Charts ==
Chart (2006)	Peak position
U.S. Billboard 200	65
U.S. Billboard Top R&B/Hip-Hop Albums	12
U.S. Billboard Top Rap Albums	7
U.S. Billboard Top Reggae Albums	1
