= Girls (Beenie Man song) =

Single by Beenie Man featuring Akon

from the album Undisputed
- B-side: "Come Test Mi"
- Released: May 30, 2006
- Recorded: 2005
- Genre: Reggae fusion, dancehall
- Length: 4:03
- Label: Virgin Records
- Songwriters: Rico Bernasconi (remixed version), Francisco Córdova, Moses Davis, Maurice Gregory, Anthony St Aubyn Kelly

Beenie Man singles chronology
"Hmm Hmm" (2006)	"Girls" (2006)	"Break It Off" (2007)

Akon singles chronology
"I Am Not My Hair (Konvict Remix)" (2006)	"Girls" (2006)	"Smack That" (2006)

"Girls" is the first single from Beenie Man's album Undisputed featuring Akon. In 2011, it was remixed by DJ Rico Bernasconi. It was subsequently released as a single which was credited to as 'Rico Bernasconi & Beenie Man featuring Akon.'

== Music video ==
The music video, directed by Little X, premiered on June 7 on Tempo TV. Before the video was aired, a "behind-the-scenes" video was exclusively aired to Tempo on the same day.

== Weekly charts ==
Chart (2006)	Peak position
CIS Airplay (TopHit)	49
New Zealand (Recorded Music NZ)	38
Scotland Singles (OCC)	55
UK Singles (OCC)	47

=== Year-end charts ===
Chart (2006)	Position
UK Urban (Music Week)	37
