= Hope Botanical Gardens =

Botanical garden in Jamaica

Coordinates: 18.0225°N 76.7493°W

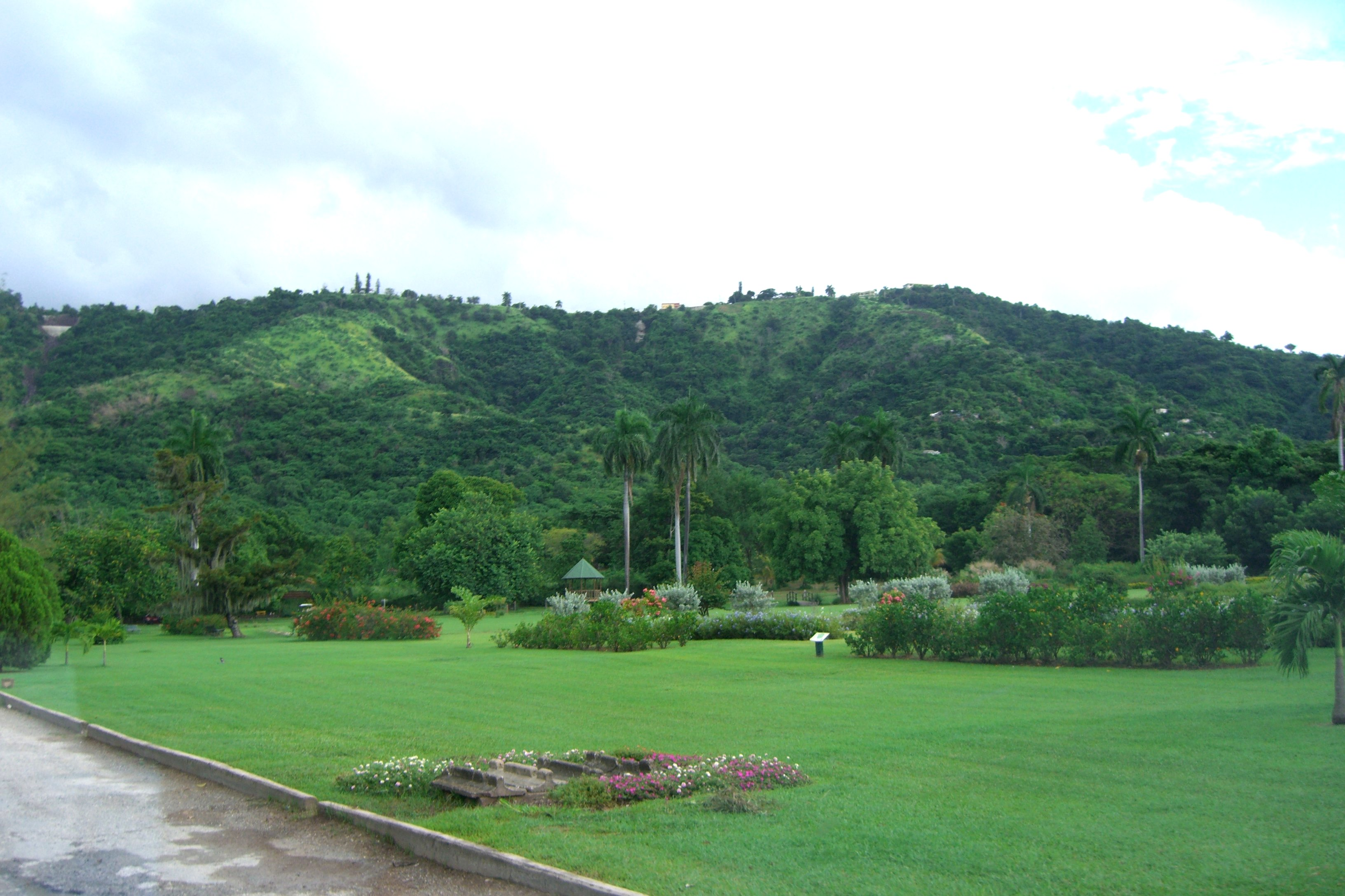
Hope Botanical Gardens, Jamaica

Hope Botanical Gardens, also known as the Royal Botanical Gardens, is a 200-acre (81 ha) park and gardens located in St Andrew, Jamaica.

== History ==
Major Richard Hope's estate was established after 1655 when the British took over Jamaica from the Spanish. Richard Hope was a commander in the British Army and received his estate due to his assistance in gaining control of Jamaica. It was developed as a sugar plantation with a watermill.

In the 19th century Hope was inherited by Richard Temple-Nugent-Brydges-Chandos-Grenville, 2nd Duke of Buckingham and Chandos. The property had belonged to his mother's family and it was passed to him via a marriage settlement. The Centre for the Study of the Legacies of British Slavery research centre at University College London has documented how Buckingham received compensation as a slave owner in the aftermath of the Slavery Abolition Act 1833. The money was paid not paid directly to him but to the trustees of his marriage settlement. The 2nd Duke was declared bankrupt in 1847.

The gardens were established in 1873 from a section of the estate. They were initially used as a site for experimental cultivation, particularly of sugarcane, but also developed into public pleasure garden. The gardens were closely connected with the Royal Botanic Gardens, Kew, through regular correspondence and sharing of plants, research, and staff. Hope became the headquarters of the Department of Botanical Gardens and Plantations in 1898, and of the Department of Agriculture in 1908.

== Attractions ==
Attractions at the gardens include a palm grove, a cactus garden, an orchid house, and ornamental ponds. This site is maintained by the Ministry of Agriculture and Fisheries (Jamaica).
