= 10 (Spice album) =

Studio album by Spice
- Released: 6 August 2021
- Recorded: 2013–2021
- Genre: Dancehall
- Length: 40:59
- Label: VP
- Producers: Shaggy; Shane Hoosong; Costi; Notnice; Teflon; Tony "CD" Kelly; Supa Dups; Di Genius; Musical Masquerade; Teetimus; Tessellated

Spice chronology
Captured (2018)	10 (2021)	Emancipated (2022)

Singles from 10
- 1. "Frenz" Released: 18 December 2020; 2. "Go Down Deh" Released: 30 April 2021; 3. "Send It Up" Released: 29 July 2021; 4. "Po-Po" Released: 11 March 2022

Professional ratings
Review scores
Source	Rating
DancehallMag	4.5/5 stars

10 is the debut studio album by Jamaican dancehall artist Spice. It was released on 6 August 2021 by VP Records. The album's writing and production were primarily handled by Shaggy, who executively produced the record, along with other members of Ranch Entertainment. It features guest appearances by Shaggy, Sean Paul, Olaf Blackwood, Melissa Musique and Spice's son Nicho. 10 was nominated for Best Reggae Album at the 64th Grammy Awards in 2022.

== Background ==
In July 2009, Spice signed a recording contract with New York-based independent record label VP Records. Her debut studio album was stated as planned to be released in November of that year, although it ultimately did not materialise. From 2015 to 2017, Spice announced several release dates for the album, which was continuously delayed by VP. In 2018, she took legal action against VP in order to be released from her recording contract. However, VP released a statement that it was working on "finalizing the album and all the necessary clearances". Spice eventually self-released her debut mixtape, Captured, on 2 November 2018. She further expressed her feelings towards the label in the mixtape's title track.

In March 2020, Spice announced on Love & Hip Hop: Atlanta that she is finally working on her debut album, which would be executively produced by Shaggy. She credited Shaggy for helping her to reconcile with VP, stating, "he got me and VP Records back on track. Everybody knows the story of us not seeing eye to eye for the past ten years, so Shaggy was the one who came in the middle and said 'OK, I will be the producer for the project, let me get this together'. I have to give thanks to Shaggy for making this happen for me". She also explained the album's title, stating, "I decided to call it 10 so it will mark the events of the last decade. My fans have been waiting for a decade, I know they're eager and I'm eager to give them this good music as well". Prior to working on the album, Spice signed a production deal with Shaggy, who commented, "I co-write with her, I write some of the songs, I produce songs, and I work with the team at VP [Records] and give them whatever expertise I have", adding, "we've come together and collectively, I brought some people from my team and some from theirs, and we created a synergy that has obviously worked, and we are doing incredibly well at it".

== Singles ==
The album's lead single, "Frenz", was released to streaming platforms on 18 December 2020. The song's accompanying music video was created as a mini-movie and was released on 23 February 2021.

"Go Down Deh", which features Sean Paul and Shaggy, was released on 30 April 2021 as the second lead single, while its music video was released the following day. The music video features cameo appearances from Major Lazer member Walshy Fire, reggae singer Naomi Cowan, dancehall artist Kemar Highcon, among others.

"Send It Up" premiered on 29 July 2021 on Jamaican radio station Zip 103 FM, and was later announced as the album's third single. Its music video was released on 14 August.

"Po-Po" featuring Nicho was released to streaming platforms on 11 March 2022 as the fourth single, while its music video was released on 26 February.

== Release and promotion ==
Prior to the release of 10, Spice promoted the single "Go Down Deh" in several live performances alongside Shaggy and Sean Paul. The three performed the song on Good Morning America as part of their Summer Concert Series on 11 June 2021, on Jimmy Kimmel Live! on 15 June, and on The Wendy Williams Show on 18 June.

== Track listing ==
10 track listing
No.	Title	Writer(s)	Producer(s)	Length
1.	"S.P.I.C.E"	Grace Hamilton; Olaf Blackwood; Orville Burrell; Shane Hoosong	Shaggy; Shane Hoosong	2:43
2.	"Send It Up"	Hamilton; Blackwood; Burrell; Hoosong	Shaggy; Shane Hoosong	2:54
3.	"Go Down Deh" (featuring Shaggy and Sean Paul)	Hamilton; Constantin Ioniță; Burrell; Sean Paul Henriques; Hoosong	Costi; Shaggy	2:34
4.	"So Mi Like It"	Hamilton; Ainsley Morris	Notnice	2:34
5.	"Size Matters"	Hamilton; Blackwood; Burrell; Hoosong	Shaggy; Hoosong	2:36
6.	"Po-Po" (featuring Nicho)	Hamilton; Nicholas Hamilton; Burrell; Hoosong	Shaggy; Hoosong	2:27
7.	"Don't Care"	Hamilton; Omar Thompson; Burrell; Sheldon Harris	Shaggy; Teflon	2:56
8.	"On Your Mind" (featuring Olaf Blackwood)	Hamilton; Blackwood; Burrell; Hoosong	Shaggy; Hoosong	2:57
9.	"Top"	Hamilton; Angela Hunte; Anthony Kelly; Dean P. Thomas; Burrell	Shaggy; Tony "CD" Kelly	2:50
10.	"Love Her"	Hamilton; Hunte; Burrell; Hoosong	Shaggy; Hoosong	2:32
11.	"Frenz"	Hamilton; Hunte; Dwayne Chin-Quee; Stephen McGregor	Supa Dups; Di Genius	3:02
12.	"Different Shit" (featuring Melissa Musique)	Hamilton; Fernandez Griffiths; Blackwood; Burrell; Paul Edmund	Musical Masquerade; Shaggy; Teetimus	2:13
13.	"FIT"	Hamilton; Thompson; Burrell; Hoosong	Shaggy; Hoosong	2:14
14.	"Bad Girl" (featuring Shaggy)	Hamilton; Kelly; Grant Valentine; Burrell; Blackwood	Shaggy; Kelly	3:34
15.	"Nitey"	Hamilton; Joshua William Meeks; Blackwood; Burrell	Shaggy; Tessellated	2:55
Total length:				40:59

== Charts ==
Chart performance for 10
Chart (2021)	Peak position
US Reggae Albums (Billboard)	6

== Release history ==
Release history of 10
Region	Date	Format	Label	Ref.
Various	6 August 2021	Digital download; streaming	VP	
Various	3 September 2021	CD	VP	
