= Atlantik (band) =

- Origin: Trinidad and Tobago
- Genres: Soca
- Years active: 1990–present
- Label: JW Productions
- Members: Destra
- Past members: Burton Toney, Dean Williams, Tony Benjamin, Tony Prescott, Demetrius (CP) Fraser, Shaka Charles, Colin Huntley, Nicole Greaves, Panky Boynes.

Atlantik is a Trinidadian soca band that was headlined by singers Burton Toney and Destra. They are known for their hits "All Aboard" and "Oh Suzanna". The band's style mixes ballads, chutney, folk, pop, R&B, reggae, soca, and worldbeat genres, and is one of the more prominent bands in Trinidad and Tobago.

== Discography ==
=== Albums ===
- Caribbean Party (1991), JW Productions
- Good Music To Dance (1992), JW Productions
- Hot Caribbean Music (1993), JW Productions
- Hot & Spicy (1997), JW Productions
- 360 Degrees Soca (1998), JW Productions
- Making Waves (1999), JW Productions
- Hard As Steel (2000), JW Productions
- Breakin All the Rules (2001), JW Productions
- Full Speed Ahead (2002), JW Productions
