= Butterfly Effect (EP) =

EP by Shontelle Sparkles
- Released: August 29, 2025
- Genre: Pop
- Length: 14:39
- Producers: Drew Louis; Phluze

Singles from Butterfly Effect
- 1. "Beauty School Dropout" Released: July 25, 2025

Butterfly Effect is the debut extended play by American musician and drag queen Shontelle Sparkles released on August 29, 2025. With pop and dark pop beats, it lyrically blends themes of transformation and self-love.

== Composition ==
Shontelle Sparkles was encouraged to create Butterfly Effect by her drag family following her feature on "Six Six Sex" with Trinity the Tuck, Jewels Sparkles, and Sam Star. The title track "Butterfly Effect" touches on themes of self expression and transformation under the metaphorical lyrics about the butterfly effect. She told The Advocate that the inspiration for the last track "Happy Ending" was her career goals to get on RuPaul's Drag Race, and how she yearns to have her successes to be as celebrated as her peers. Drew Louis oversaw production and writing of the EP, which features songs co-written and produced with Shontelle Sparkles, Coen Hutton, Jayelle, and Phluze.

== Track listing ==
Track listing and credits adapted from Apple Music and Spotify.

Butterfly Effect – standard edition track listing
No.	Title	Writer(s)	Producer(s)	Length
1.	"Glow Up"	Shawn Davis Berger; Drew Louis; Coen Hutton	Drew Louis	2:30
2.	"Beauty School Dropout"	Berger; Louis; Jayelle	Louis	2:56
3.	"Diamond Dust"	Berger; Louis; Hutton	Louis	2:50
4.	"Butterfly Effect"	Berger; Louis; Hutton	Louis	2:45
5.	"Happy Ending"	Berger; Louis; Hutton; Filipe Sousa	Louis; Phluze	3:37
Total length:				14:39

Butterfly Effect – deluxe edition track listing
No.	Title	Writer(s)	Producer(s)	Length
1.	"Intro (featuring Angelica Ross)"	Shawn Davis Berger; Drew Louis; Coen Hutton	Drew Louis	0:38
2.	"Calling The Corners (featuring Angelica Ross, Hym, & Trinity the Tuck)"	Berger; Louis; Hutton; Hym	Louis	3:22
3.	"Phantom Lover"	Berger; Louis; Hutton	Louis	3:01
9.	"Glow Up (featuring Pangina Heals)"	Berger; Louis; Hutton	Louis	2:30
10.	"Beauty School Dropout (featuring Sasha Colby)"	Berger; Louis; Jayelle	Louis	2:56
11.	"Beauty School Dropout (featuring London Hill)"	Berger; Louis; Jayelle; Juliana Jonhope	Louis	3:12
12.	"Butterfly Effect (Dave Audé Remix)"	Berger; Louis; Hutton	Louis	5:02
13.	"Butterfly Effect (The Chrysalis Remix)"	Berger; Louis; Hutton	Louis	4:16
14.	"Happy Ending (80's Remix)"	Berger; Louis; Hutton; Filipe Sousa	Louis; Phluze	4:34
Total length:				44:16

== Personnel ==
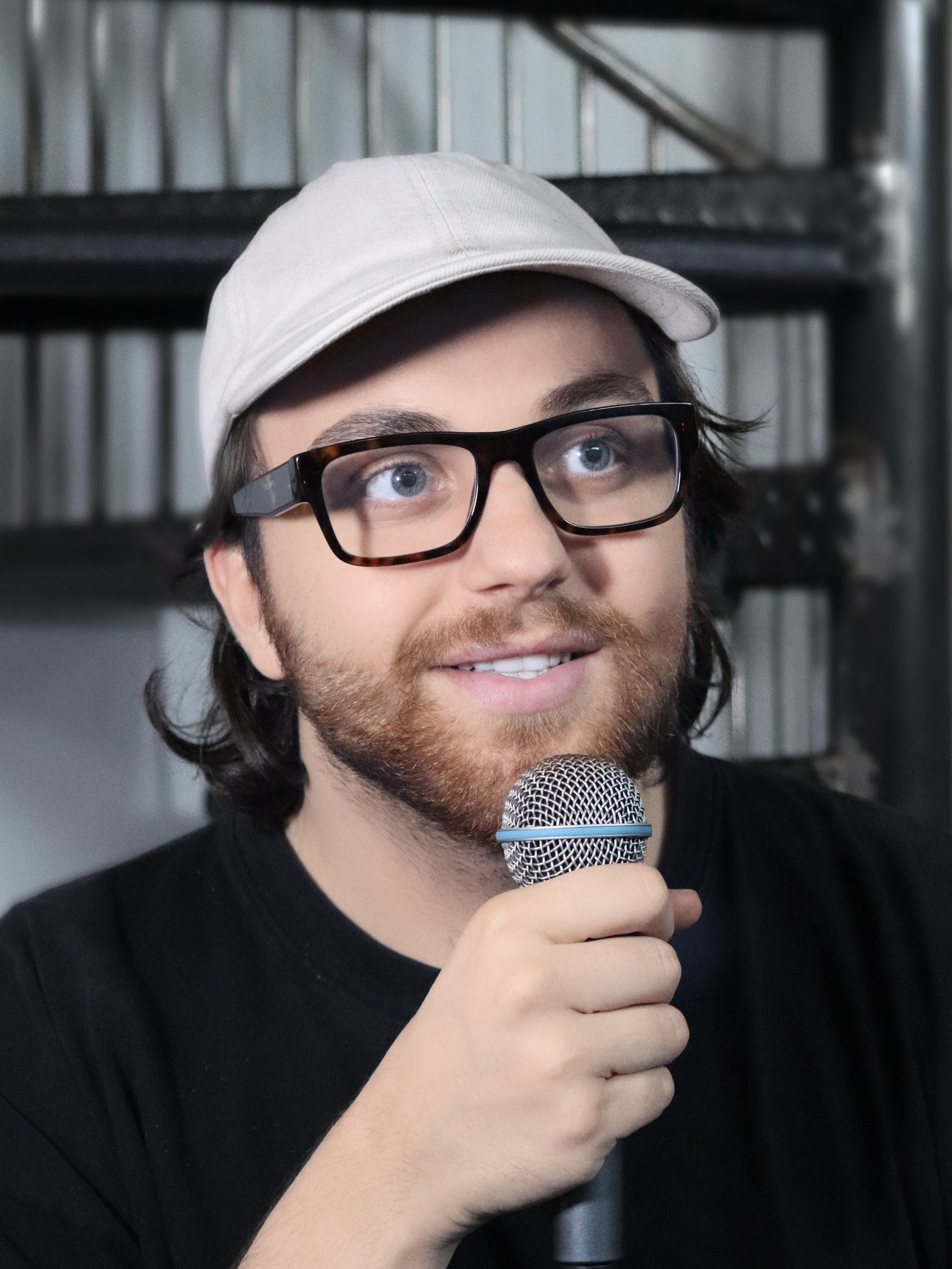
Drew Louis executive produced and co-wrote the EP.

Personnel adapted from Apple Music and Spotify.

- Shontelle Sparkles – primary artist, composer, vocals
- London Hill – featured artist, composer, vocals
- Hym – featured artist, composer, vocals
- Angelica Ross – featured artist, vocals
- Trinity the Tuck – featured artist, vocals
- Pangina Heals – featured artist, vocals
- Sasha Colby – featured artist, vocals
- Drew Louis – composer, producer
- Phluze – composer, producer
- Coen Hutton – composer
- Jayelle – composer
