= Gospel JA FM =

- Kingston; Jamaica
- Frequencies: 91.7 & 91.9 MHz

Programming
- Format: Gospel reggae, Gospel

Ownership
- Owner: KC Broadcasting Company; (KC Broadcasting Company Limited)

History
- First air date: 25 February 2012

Links
- Webcast: Live Stream
- Website: https://www.gospelja.com/

Gospel JA FM (91.7 & 91.9 MHz) is a Jamaican commercial FM gospel radio station. It is owned and operated by KC Broadcasting Company Limited. Gospel JA fm operates in Jamaica on 91.7 and 91.9 on the FM band. Gospel JA fm has its offices and studios at 10 Collins Green Avenue, Kingston 5, Jamaica. The CEO/Managing Director of Gospel JA fm is Wyatt K. C. Davis. Gospel JA fm plays 80% Jamaican gospel music.
