= Concept of Life =

Studio album by Beenie Man
- Released: January 25, 2006
- Genres: Dancehall; reggae; ragga
- Length: 1:07:37
- Label: Corner Shop

Beenie Man chronology
Hundred Dollar Bag (2005)	Concept of Life (2006)	Undisputed (2006)

Concept Of Life is the seventeenth studio album by Jamaican musician Beenie Man.

== Track listing ==
1. "Do Supmmm..." - 4:06
2. "Concept of Life" - 3:51
3. "Love You" - 4:05
4. "Settle Down" (featuring Gringo) - 3:27
5. "Hot" (featuring Spice) - 5:04
6. "Sign Me Up" - 3:21
7. "Politrix" - 3:33
8. "One Pound a Day" (featuring Cornel Campbell & John Holt) - 4:06
9. "Imagination" (featuring Devonte) - 3:50
10. "Be a Friend" (featuring Ghost) - 3:22
11. "No Promise" - 3:23
12. "Nah Resign" - 3:20
13. "God Black" - 3:30
14. "From Birth" (featuring Zahair) - 4:07
