= KickRaux =

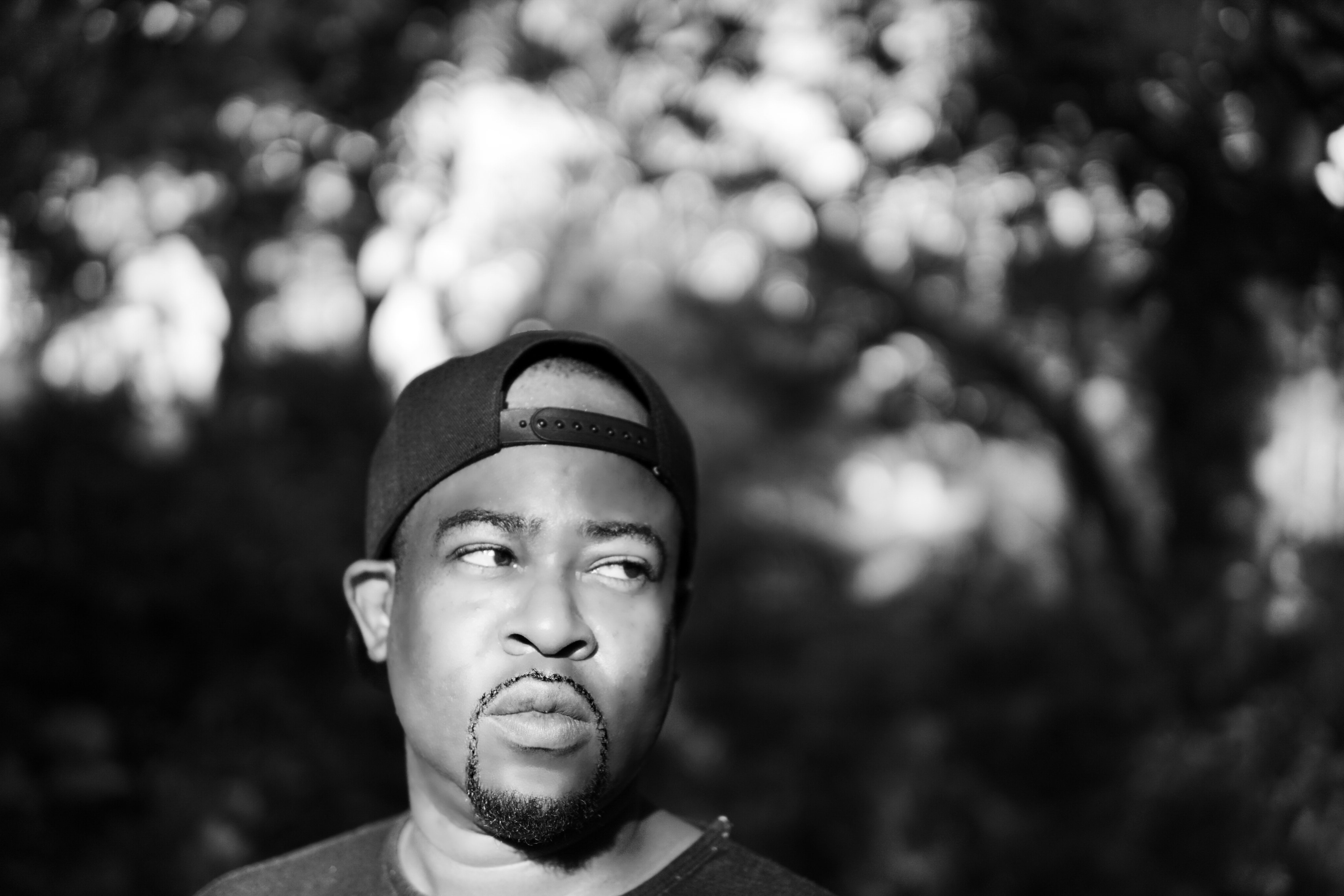
- KickRaux in 2017

Background information
- Also known as: KickRaux
- Origin: Waterford, Portmore, Jamaica
- Genres: Rock, Dance, Dancehall, Reggae
- Years active: 2010–present
- Labels: Foreign Xchg, Mad Decent, Atlantic Records
- Website: kickrauxmusic.com

KickRaux is a Jamaican DJ, record producer, songwriter and music executive. He has collaborated with producers and vocalists such as Vybz Kartel, Major Lazer, Tyga, Wizkid, Machel Montano, Chronixx, Konshens, Busta Rhymes, Charly Black, Demarco and is known for his remixes of artists such as Migos, Jay Z, Mila J, Kranium & M.I.A. Major Lazer frontman Diplo referred to KickRaux as "one of (his) favorite new producers." In early 2014, KickRaux was credited with coining the term Future Dancehall, which refers to his style of music productions.

== Early life ==
KickRaux was born in Portmore, Jamaica and raised in Miami, Florida. His early remixes led to a feature on MTV UK's The Wrap Up. KickRaux replaced the name Rieces Pieces under which he produced his first remix of M.I.A. featuring Jay Z "XXXO'". In 2012 he produced several dancehall remixes which led to radio play on BBC Radio 1Xtra and other international radio stations across Russia, France, Canada, Australia and the Caribbean. In 2013, KickRaux went back to EDM bass music to collaborate and release EDM remixes which received positive reviews and support from a number or publications (MTV Hive, Spin Magazine, Vibe, Peace Magazine, Pigeons & Planes, The Frontliner) and DJs of the genre (Flosstradamus, Dj Carnage, Nick Catchdubs, Dirty South Joe and Swizzymack). This led to a US city tour which included sharing the stage with Krewella and Brillz. In 2013 he partnered with MTV for an Exclusive Guest Mix. He also partnered with MySpace for a front page release premiere

== Production credits ==
List of songs as producer or co-producer, with performing artists and other credited producers, showing year released and album name
Title	Year	Performing artist(s)	Other producer(s)	Album	Label
"XXXO (Remix)"	2010	MIA, Jay Z	none	XXXO The Remixes	Interscope Records
"OG Bobby Johnson (Remix)"	2014	Que	none	Single	Atlantic Records
"Jumpin Like Jordan (Remix)"	2014	Migos and Rich The Kid	none	Streets on Lock III	Quality Control
"My Main (Remix)"	2015	Mila J and Ty Dolla Sign	none	Single	Motown Records
"Nobody Has To Know (Remix)"	2015	Kranium and Ty Dolla Sign	Diplo Jr Blender	Rumors	Atlantic Records
"Bend Down Pause (Remix)"	2015	Runtown and Wizkid & Machel Montano	Del B	Single	Eric Many Entertainment
"Lyrical Anamoly"	2016	Kabaka Pyramid and Chronixx	none	Accurate	Bebble Rock
"Bring The Beat"	2016	Machel Montano and Tessanne Chin featuring Usain Bolt	none	Single	MONK Music
"Come Closer"	2016	Faustix and David Jay	none	Come Closer The Remixes	Warner Music Denmark
"Feelin U"	2016	KickRaux and Tyga and Ayo Jay and Demarco and Doctor	none	Forward	Foreign XCHG
"Buss"	2016	KickRaux and Busta Rhymes and Masicka	none	Forward	Foreign XCHG
"Wine To The Top"	2017	Vybz Kartel and Wizkid	none	World Fete Riddim	TJ Records
"Turn Me On"	2017	Konshens	none	World Fete Riddim	TJ Records
"Brace on You"	2017	Masicka	none	World Fete Riddim	TJ Records
"You're Perfect"	2017	Charly Black	none	World Fete Riddim	TJ Records
