= Copyright Music Organisation of Trinidad and Tobago =

Music licensing organisation

The Copyright Music Organisation of Trinidad and Tobago (COTT) is a non-profit association representing people in the music industry of Trinidad and Tobago. COTT was incorporated in 1984 and began operating in 1985. A member of International Federation of the Phonographic Industry since 2019.

Before COTT was established its current role was carried out by the United Kingdom's Performing Right Society.
