= 21st Hapilos Digital =

21st Hapilos Digital Distribution is a dancehall and reggae online distribution company based in Manhattan, New York, with offices in Kingston, Jamaica. The company was founded in 2009 and has distributed music for Vybz Kartel, Mavado, Konshens, Sizzla, Beenie Man, Rvssian, Sean Paul, and Popcaan, among others. Every year the company hosts a Digital Awards that recognizes Top Video, Top Selling Single, Top Riddims, Top Reggae Singles, producers and more. The winners for the Digital Awards are selected from raw sales data. In 2017, 21st Hapilos Digital launched the 21st Hapilos Top 10 Digital Chart based on digital sales
