= Nationwide 90FM =

Jamaican radio station

NationWide Radio 90FM is a Jamaican radio station in Kingston frequency 90.3 broadcasting in Kingston. It offers all platform of news updates in sports, entertainment programmes and current affairs. The radio station was established by Nationwide News Network Team and known as thoroughly, fair and balanced in news reports published by WatchDog Editorial Board.

Nationwide 90FM also features entertainment shows broadcasting not only in Jamaica but also heard online over the islands and in United States.
