= Destra Garcia =

Trinidadian musician

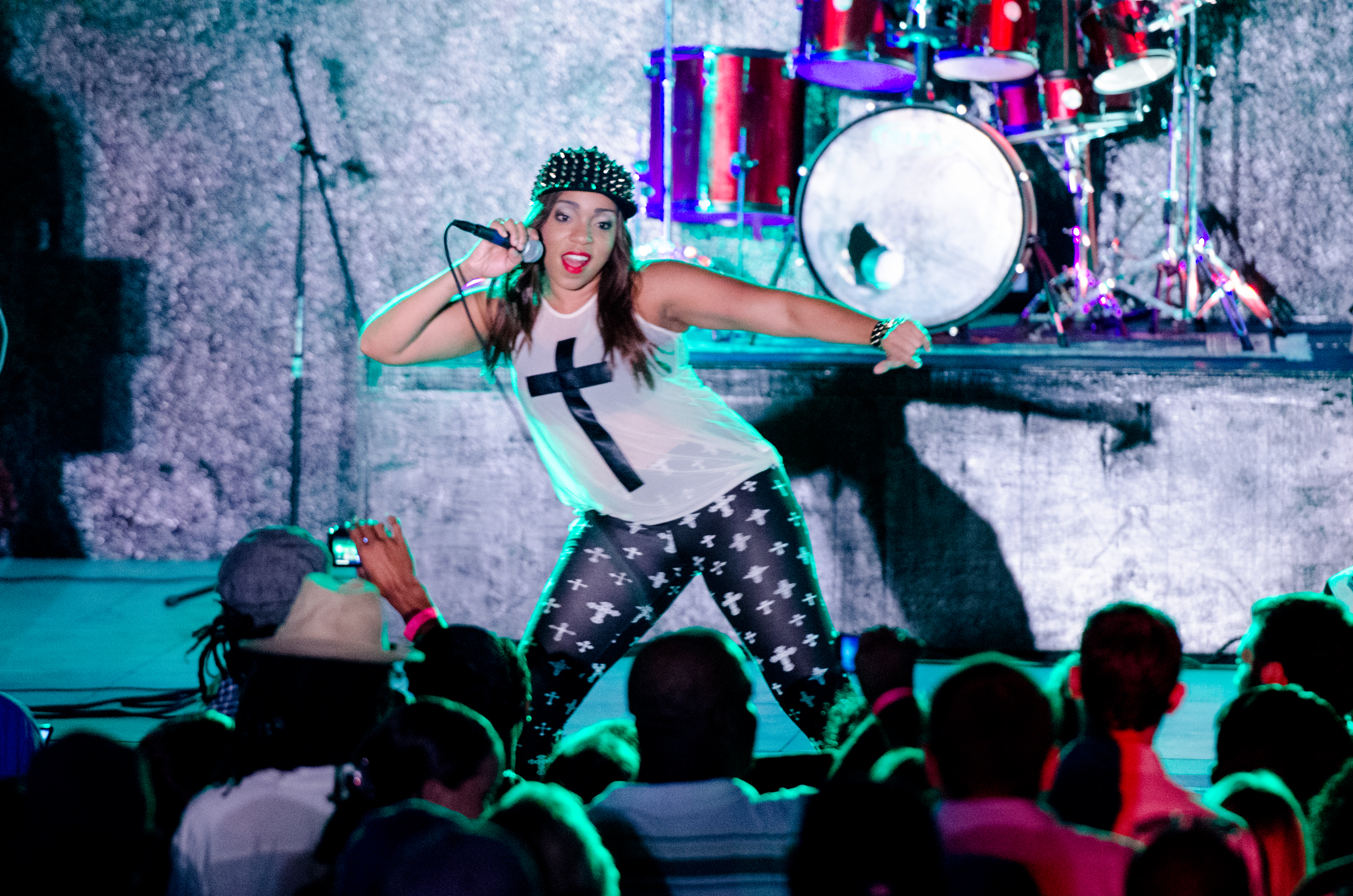
- Destra Garcia (2013)
- Born: November 10, 1978 (age 47); Laventille, Trinidad and Tobago
- Other names: Queen of Soca, Queen of Bachanal, Lucy
- Occupations: Singer, songwriter
- Years active: 1998–present
- Musical career
- Genres: Soca; R&B; pop
- Label: Bamboo Entertainment

Destra Garcia (born 10 November 1978) is a Trinidadian soca musician, singer and songwriter. She is often referred to as the Queen of Soca, the Queen of Bacchanal (Q.O.B.), or her stage alter ego, Lucy.

== Biography ==
=== Childhood and early musical interests ===
Destra Garcia was born in the east Port of Spain community of Desperlie Crescent, Laventille, on the island of Trinidad to guitarist Lloyd Augustin Garcia and Debra Garcia as the eldest of four siblings. Her paternal great-grandfather was from Venezuela, her maternal great-grandfather was from France and her maternal great-grandmother was from Spain.

In addition to her father, Destra's beginnings in music stem from her late grandfather, Frankie Garcia, a local jazz musician. While attending Woodbrook Government Secondary school and St James Secondary School, she discovered her passion for singing. Destra went on to win her schools' Calypso Monarch title for five consecutive years.

With an early interest in pop and R&B, Destra initially pursued a career in America with early recordings lobbied to labels by an American A&R executive. She also joined the girl group Psyke, which disbanded after one year. Following the disbanding of the collective, Destra attended the School of Business and Management, earning a diploma in Sales Management.

=== Stepping into success ===
In 1999 Roy Cape All-Stars took notice of her single titled "Ah Have A Man Already" with Third Bass and invited her to join the Roy Cape All-Stars band as one of the lead vocalists. She pursued a solo career briefly, but eventually joined the band Atlantik in late 2002. She then forged a successful songwriting partnership with Kernal Roberts until 2005, churning out hits such as "Whe Yuh Want", "Negative Vibes" and "Bonnie & Clyde".

In 2003 Destra released her first album, Red, White, Black, which included her hit duet "It's Carnival" with fellow soca artist Machel Montano. The song became the virtual anthem of Trinidad and Tobago carnival that year and is widely known throughout the Caribbean and, by extension, the world.

=== Soca icon ===
Destra won the Carnival Road March title in 2003 at Brooklyn's Labour Day Carnival. Her 2004 hit single "Bonnie and Clyde" also became the theme song of a Malibu Rum TV advertisement.

Georgia Popplewell of Caribbean Beat magazine in 2006 described Destra's music as "the kind of sound that a young person, living at the crossroads of cultures and technologies that is Trinidad and Tobago today, is likely to produce, and the breeziness of her music may well act as an antidote to the hard edge that often characterises life not only in Trinidad and Tobago, but in many other corners of the globe.

What's more, mobile telecommunications group Digicel appointed Destra, in 2006, as their first ever female spokeswoman in Trinidad and Tobago.

She's yet to win either Trinidad's Carnival Road March or Soca Monarch titles, although coming close on occasion. Despite this, she's become an icon of soca, renowned for her pop-oriented tunes incorporating both world and fusion music. During both 2014 and 2015, Destra won Best International Act at the Black Canadian Awards. Additionally, Destra has collaborated with renowned artistes such as Nicki Minaj, Mr. Vegas, Karlie Redd, Tanya Stephens and Spice.

=== Cultural influence ===
With Caribbean roots going back to Trinidad and Tobago, Destra Garcia values the tradition of her culture. Destra started by experimenting with calypso as well as R&B and gospel. Only when Destra became fond of soca did she find her passion and place. Soca originated in the Caribbean with Trinidadian roots. Originally dubbed "soul calypso", the genre was created by Lord Shorty as essentially calypso with sexualized vocals and a faster pace. Within one of her most popular songs, "It's Carnival", she states, "Carnival in T&T is so special to all ah we", expressing her own cognizance about carnival's significance from a national and regional standpoint. The content of her songs typically pertains to her Caribbean roots, with this as one example.

As Destra became more popular, she encountered a challenge. She wanted to grow her fan base but also stay true to both her roots and Caribbean culture. She began collaborating with outside artists to expand her artistic range. She also embarked upon extensive tours to allow for more exposure, promote the sounds of soca and attract larger audiences. She also makes mention that the biggest setback she faces is the pressure she feels from Trinidad to stay within traditional confines of the soca style. As an artist Garcia seeks to balance artistic evolution with cultural authenticity. She aims to explore her artistic boundaries while maintaining her cultural identy and retaining her established fan base.

== Image ==
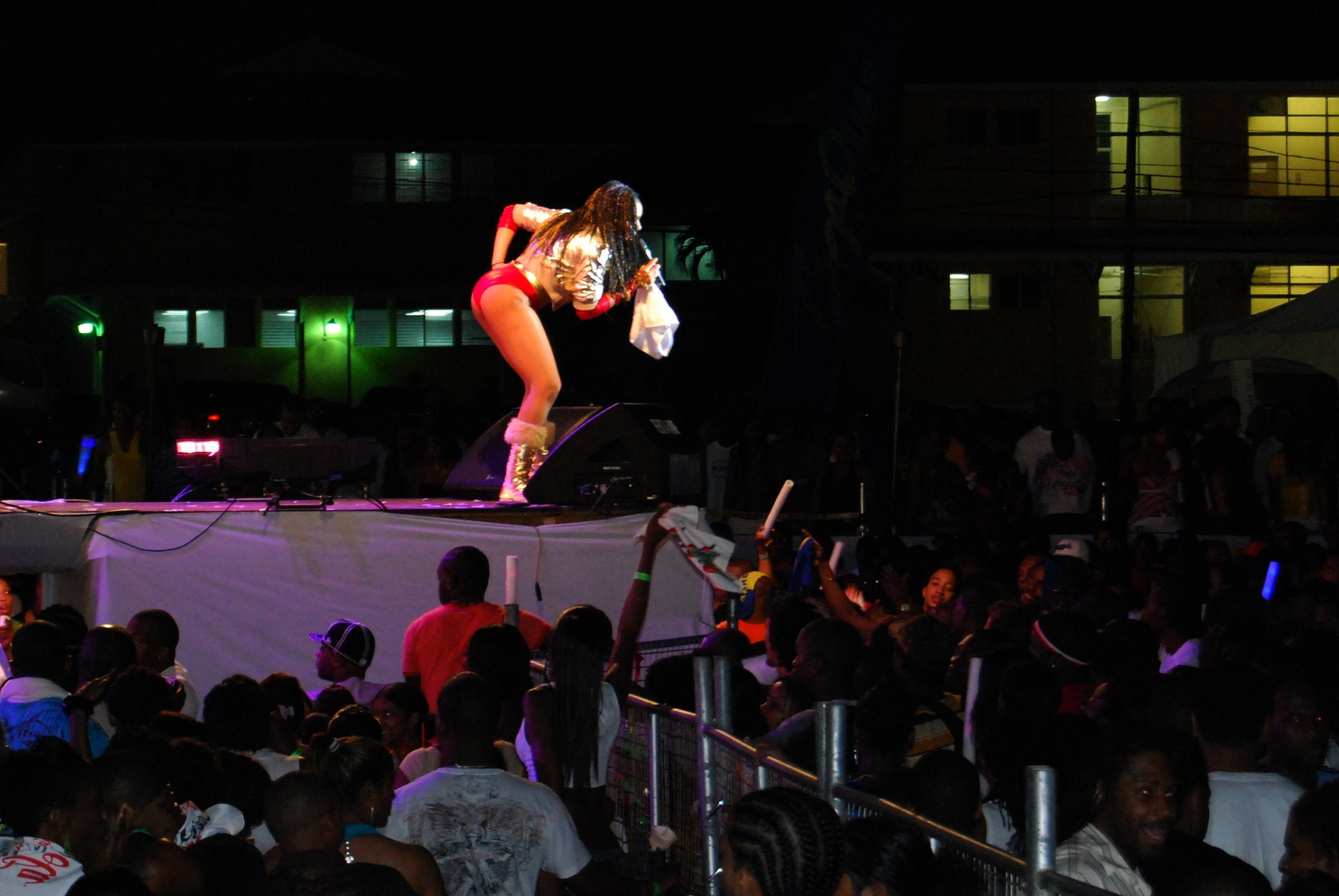
Destra performing at UWI Splash in St. Augustine

Destra Garcia is known as the Queen of Bacchanal, QoB for short, because of the excitement listeners hear in the inflection of her voice on radio talk shows and because of her own Carnival-inspired event "Festival of Bacchanal". She also is known for having an alter ego named Lucy who is supposed to personify the more sexual aspect of Destra. In her 2017 song "Destra vs. Lucy", one of the lines is, "[Cause] I [will] sing like Destra, but still [work] it like Lucy", which tells listeners that Lucy is the sexual ego and Destra is the singing one. More detail on Destra's personalities can be heard on a comedic interview with the ego "Lucy" herself on a radio show called "Breakfast Party". In the interview Lucy reveals that Destra is "holding [Lucy] back,... [she's] too safe" and Destra always watches what she says.

Destra Garcia's sexual ego "Lucy" is speculated to come from Carnival in Trinidad. In her song "Lucy", she sings about growing up a good girl and good student but one day when she is exposed to Carnival she and her dancing start to become very sexual. Today Carnival consists of women masquerading and "showing off" their bodies through dance and revealing clothing, which creates sexual tension and is what Destra probably sees on TV. Carnival in Trinidad has become so sexual because of the dominance of women who attend and their preference for highly sexualized dancing.

Destra is famous for her style. Due to her radical clothing choices consisting primarily of revealing clothing such as tight, short pants, and low-cut bra tops, she has captivated audiences during her performances. On stage, Destra is wild and explosive in her movements and vocals, sometimes seemingly performing in her own world due to her passion. Destra has expressed her music and fashion choices as a merger between American punk rock and soca. This mix is evident in the instruments used in Destra's music, as she frequently utilizes rock guitar acoustics with underlying soca rhythms. Her 2006 look "soca fabulous" has been created by local designers such as Meiling and Peter Elias. From a new "glam" hairstyle, to her bold, risqué wardrobe, Destra's new look has been described as one which "is going to rock the town and will be a fashion force to reckon with."

=== Social media, style, and performance ===
Destra is one of the leading ladies of soca music. The Queen of Bacchanal expresses that "At Carnival you are studying so much more: the audiences what people are saying about you what you are doing what you are wearing". Not only do blogs about Destra revere her musical talent, they also express admiration for her physique, in particular her fit abs. Her defined abdominals have also become part of Destra's celebrity persona that fans think of when they think Destra Garcia. One blogger exclaims 'I will admit I am extremely jealous of dem abs, I wish mines was like dat but I guess I hadda wuk rel hard'. The tumblr page named 'Triniwoodentertainment' provides images of the star's activity with captions utilizing the same admiring tone such as 'Check out the soca songstress and Queen of Bacchanal, Destra Garcia showing off her abs and curves figure on a scorching hot Sunday. Fit to be a Queen, indeed.' This caption is for a picture of a bikini-clad Destra Garcia enjoying the sun. The blog's post includes a link to the image which is originally from Destra's official Instagram.

Garcia is very active on social media, with Twitter, Instagram, and Facebook accounts. She states, "Everybody is experimenting to see if we could take soca to another level. I think soca is already good, I’ve decided to see if I can make it more marketable." Her activity on social media has allowed her to not only connect more with her fan base but also cultivate a community around her music. In an interview with Huffington Post, we learn that "while many popular figures have social media managers, Destra sees things differently. Therefore, to build a level of authenticity, she believes that it is imperative that she does it herself."

The Queen of Bacchanal believes that when it comes to artists, "At Carnival you are studying so much more: the music, audiences, what people are saying about what you are doing, what you are wearing". Destra is famous for her music and fashion style, which she describes as "a merger between American punk rock and Soca". Her style transcends the traditional and modernity. Similarly, Malian West African and blues singer and songwriter Kar Kar's personal style was also influenced by the American rock n' roll era. The YouTube clip titled 'Destra Garcia Live at Soca on De Hill 2015' is a live performance that exhibits her wardrobe style and energy on stage. Destra wears a black leather jacket with fringes along the sleeves and pink Dr. Martens boots. These pieces can be described as American punk rock. She is also wearing revealing, extremely short spandex shorts that allow her to maneuver and dance effortlessly with a potential partner to the soca music. Destra captivates the crowd by trying to instruct a male fan from the audience on how to dance with her on stage. She places his hands on the side of her hips and demands "Now you have to listen to me". Destra is authoritative and fiery in her dance directions and quickly loses patience with this first potential male dance partner. The failing dancing attempt lightens the mood with its comical aspect. When he fails to follow the rest of her instructions, she exclaims "I can't teach you nothing". Nonetheless, she dismisses him with a hug then gestures 'Off Off Off!’. In order to keep the show moving, she quickly calls two more men from the crowd on stage and warns "I don't like men that are slow". The man that moves his hips well to the soca music pleases Destra and she proceeds to dance with him. This performance showcases Destra Garcia's fiery personality and her ability to transcend through the traditional and modernity in soca. She dances traditionally to soca alongside her male dance partner. However, Destra breaks out of the traditional passive female role by taking on the authoritative role of not only leading in the dance but also verbally commanding her male dance partner's movements. Destra's confidence and dominance are aspects of her captivating persona that make her a strong, dynamic female figure in the male-dominated soca music genre.

== Awards and nominations ==
Following Trinidad and Tobago's annual Republic Day National Awards Ceremony on 24 September, 2026, Garcia was conferred the Medal for the Development of Women (Gold) for her lasting contributions to the representation and empowerment of women through her storied music career.

Year	Type	Award	Result
2003	COTT Music Awards	Female Songwriter of the Year	Won
2004	COTT Music Awards	Female Songwriter of the Year	Won
2005	COTT Music Awards	Female Songwriter of the Year	Won
2006	COTT Music Awards	Female Songwriter of the Year	Won
2007	COTT Music Awards	Female Songwriter of the Year	Won
2008	COTT Music Awards	Female Songwriter of the Year	Won
2013	International Soca Awards (Caribbean)	Song of the Year	Won
2014	Black Canadian Awards	Best International Act (Caribbean)	Won
2015	Black Canadian Awards	Best International Act (Caribbean)	Won

== Discography ==
=== Albums ===
Released	Album
2003	Red, White, Black
2004	Laventille Pre-Release Singles
2005	Laventille
2006	Independent Lady
2008	Soca or Die
2009	Hott
2011	Welcome Back
2012	Mydestra
2014	The Queen Of Bacchanal
2015	Bakanation
2016	Queen
2018	Destraction
2019	D-20
2020	Queendom
