= Ministry of Agriculture and Fisheries (Jamaica) =

Government ministry of Jamaica

The Ministry of Agriculture and Fisheries (MoAF) is a government ministry of Jamaica. Its head office is in Kingston.
