= Pamputtae =

Jamaican dancehall artist

- Born: Eveana Henry; 1985 (age 40–41); Kingston, Jamaica
- Origin: Jamaica
- Genres: Dancehall, Reggae
- Occupations: Singer, songwriter
- Years active: 2006–present

Eveana Henry (born 1985) know professionally as Pamputtae is a Jamaican dancehall artist.

== Career ==
In 2006, she contributed the intro for Tony Matterhorn song "Goodas Fi Dem."

In 2018, her single ''Single Mother'' received attention from Trinidadian-American rapper Foxy Brown.

In 2019, rumors circulated that Beenie Man attacked her at a birthday party, where she gave a performance for supporters of the Jamaica Labour Party. In response, Beenie Man's team considered a defamation lawsuit. In 2020, Pamputtae and Lisa Hyper had a feud over an explicit photo, which later ended.

Pamputtae performed at Pride Toronto in 2023.

In 2024, she had a cameo in the Netflix drama series Champion.

== Personal life ==
Born Eveana Henry, she became a mother at age 16. She dropped out of high school and received her education through the Women's Centre of Jamaica Foundation. She is open about her experience with teen pregnancy and created a foundation to help single mothers in 2018.

== Discography ==
- Ride it
- Single Mother
- Slim vs Fluffy
- Sidung Pon Di Buddy
