= Skeng =

Jamaican dancehall musician

- Born: Kevon Douglas; 13 February 2001 (age 25); St. Catherine, Jamaica
- Origin: Jamaica
- Genres: Dancehall, traphall
- Occupations: Singer, songwriter, deejay
- Instrument: Vocals
- Years active: 2021–present

Kevon Douglas (born 13 February 2001), known professionally as Skeng is a Jamaican dancehall artist Skeng gained international recognition after collaborating with Trinidadian artist Nicki Minaj on the single “Likkle Miss (Remix)” which enter the Billboard Chart. and peaked at number 6, he also collaborated with Dancehall artiste Tommy Lee Sparta on "Protocol".

== Biography ==
Skeng developed an early interest in music while growing up in St. Catherine, Jamaica, and began honing his craft as a teenager. He drew inspiration from both old-school dancehall icons and contemporary trap-influenced beats, blending gritty lyrics with high-energy performances.

Following his initial success, Skeng continued with a string of singles that showcased his signature aggressive delivery and street-centered themes. His style has often been described as a fusion of hardcore dancehall with elements of modern hip-hop.

In addition to his collaborations, Skeng has remained a prolific solo artist.

Skeng's musical style is part of a new wave of dancehall, often referred to as "traphall," where traditional rhythms intersect with darker, trap-inspired production. Despite some controversies over the lyrical content of his songs, he remains a prominent voice among the younger generation of dancehall artists.

== Discography ==
=== Singles ===
Title	Year	Collaborator(s)	Chart Positions	Ref(s)
"Gvnman Shift"	2021	—	iTunes (Grenada): No. 94	
"Protocol"	2021	Tommy Lee Sparta	YouTube (Jamaica): No. 1	
"Likkle Miss" (Remix)	2022	Nicki Minaj	Billboard Digital Song Sales: No. 18; Billboard R&B/Hip-Hop Digital Song Sales: No. 6 Billboard Rap Digital Song Sales: No. 4	
"Talibhan"	2022	Stalk Ashley	YouTube (Jamaica): No. 1	
"Life Changes"	2022	—	iTunes (Grenada): No. 93	
"23"	2021	—	Apple Music (St. Vincent and the Grenadines): No. 92	

== Filmography ==
=== Music videos ===
Year	Title	Role	Notes	Ref(s)
2022	"Likkle Miss" (Remix)	Himself	Official music video for the hit collaboration with Nicki Minaj.	
2023	"Shottaz"	Wayne Smith	Music video short film inspired by the 2002 Jamaican crime film Shottas; co-stars Kraff as Biggs. Directed by Now or Never.	

== Television appearances ==
Year	Show/Network	Format	Notes	Ref(s)
2022	TVJ Entertainment Prime	Interview	Skeng discussed his rise in dancehall and his musical influences.	
2022	Dancehall Tours	Interview	Skeng spoke about his experiences in the dancehall scene and the role of cannabis in his music.	
2023	Magnum Xplosion	Live Performance	Skeng delivered a high-energy performance, marking his return to Trinidad after a three-year hiatus.	

== Awards ==
Year	Award	Category	Work	Result	Ref(s)
2023	Caribbean Music Awards	Collaboration of the Year (Dancehall/Reggae)	"Likkle Miss" (with Nicki Minaj)	Won	
2023	MECA Awards	Male Dancehall Artiste of the Year	—	Won	
2023	MECA Awards	Best Collaboration of the Year	"Likkle Miss" (with Nicki Minaj)	Won	
