= Eifel (disambiguation) =

Eifel is a low mountain range in Germany, Luxembourg and Belgium

Eifel may also refer to:

== Places ==
- Eifel Park (disambiguation), multiple parks
- volcanic Eifel, a region of Germany
- Eifel hotspot, a volcanic formation in Germany
- Eifel Formation, a Palaeogene geologic formation in Germany

=== Facilities and structures ===
- Eifel Aqueduct, one of the longest aqueducts of the Roman Empire
- Eifel Railway, in Germany
- Eifel Transmitter, Scharteberg, Vulkaneifel, Rhineland-Palatinate, Germany; an FM and TV transmitter
- Eifel Park, Gondorf, Bitburg-Prüm, Rhineland-Palatinate, Germany; a wildlife park

== Other uses ==
- Eifel dialects, dialects of German spoken in the Eifel mountains
- Eifel Rule, a linguistic phenomenon documented in the Eifel dialects
- Eifel Grand Prix, a Formula One grand prix, raced in the Eifel region of Germany
- Ford Eifel (1935–1940), a car made by Ford Germany
- Eifel Club, a rambling club in Germany
- FV Eifel, a German fishing trawler in service 1930–41 and 1945–54 which served as the vorpostenboot V 313 Eifel 1941–45

== See also ==
- 8665 Daun-Eifel, a main belt asteroid
- Belgian Eifel, a linguistic and geographic region of Belgium
- Voreifel (German: Pre-Eifel), a region of Germany
- High Eifel, a region of the mountain range
- North Eifel, a region of the mountain range
- South Eifel, a region of the mountain range
- East Eifel, a region of the mountain range
- West Eifel, a region of the mountain range
- Cross Eifel Railway, in Germany
- Lahn-Eifel-Bahn, a passenger rail service in Germany
- Battle of the Schnee Eifel (1944) a WWII battle
- Jean Effel (1908–1982), French painter, caricaturist, illustrator and journalist
- Eiffel (disambiguation)
