= Effel =

Effel may refer to:

- Jean Effel (1908–1982), French painter, caricaturist, illustrator and journalist
- Jack Effel, World Series of Poker tournament director; see Tournament director (poker)
- Effel Mohammed, principal of North Eastern College, Sangre Grande, Trinidad, Trinidad and Tobago.
- Effel (1990s), a computer-aided engineering (CAE) package from software developer GRAITEC

== See also ==
- Eiffel (disambiguation)
- Eifel (disambiguation)
