= Gyalgebra =

GYALGEBRA

Mixtape by Major Lazer
- Released: November 21, 2025
- Recorded: 2024–2025
- Studio: Pompey (Port Antonio)
- Genres: Dancehall; electronic; brazilian funk; Miami jook; soca
- Length: 22:51
- Languages: English; Portuguese; Spanish
- Labels: Mad Decent; Because Music
- Producers: Diplo; Walshy Fire; Boaz van de Beatz; Ape Drums; Spanker; Kybba; BomboCat; Ali Stone; Maffalda; Mulú; Beau Knox; Nitti Gritti; Kordhell (uncredited)

Major Lazer chronology
Piano Republik (2023)	GYALGEBRA (2025)

Singles from Gyalgebra
- 1. "Gangsta" Released: August 27, 2025; 2. "Bruk Down" Released: October 24, 2025; 3. "Peppa Pot" Released: November 21, 2025

Gyalgebra (stylized in all caps) is the sixth studio album by American electronic band Major Lazer. It was released on November 21, 2025, via Mad Decent and Because Music. The project is the group's first self-contained body of work in five years and serves as the official introduction of America Foster as the group's first-ever in-house vocalist and "First Lady".

== Background and recording ==
Following a brief live performance hiatus, Major Lazer began rolling out new music through unconventional channels, including premiering tracks on Twitch and during college fraternity pop-up shows. The mixtape was recorded largely at Pompey, Diplo's newly established studio sanctuary in Jamaica.

The project prominently features vocalist America Foster. After Diplo discovered her freestyling, she was invited to Jamaica in October 2024 to record, eventually joining Major Lazer as an official member during their 2025 European summer tour. The title GYALGEBRA reflects her addition to the group, referencing her status as their first female member.

== Composition ==
Musically, GYALGEBRA marks a return to Major Lazer's early, unpredictable genre mash-ups and "outsider dancehall energy." The nine-track mixtape incorporates a wide array of global club genres, including dancehall, drill, shatta, zess, dembow, soca, bouyon, Miami jook, and funk carioca.

Guest contributors on the mixtape include Jamaican dancehall singer Busy Signal, Dominican singer Tokischa, Trinidadian soca star Bunji Garlin, New Zealand choreographer and singer Parris Goebel, Toronto singer SadBoi, Trinidadian zess singer Lady Lava, and Miami jook pioneer DJ Chipman. Production contributions also include Amsterdam-based DJ Kybba on the shatta-influenced track "GANGSTA".

== Track listing ==
No.	Title	Writer(s)	Producer(s)	Length
1.	"Bruk Down" (featuring America Foster, Parris Goebel and SadBoi)	Boaz De Jong; Parris Goebel; America Foster; Ebhoni Cato-O'Garro; Tyshane Thompson; Aynzli Jones; Joshua Meeks; Omar Isaiah Lupuk	Diplo; Boaz van de Beatz	2:45
2.	"What Is The Time" (featuring Lady Lava)	Thomas Wesley Pentz; Jong; Leighton Walsh; Keisha Harris; Dion Gomez; SPANKER	Diplo; Beatz	2:25
3.	"Gangsta" (featuring Busy Signal and Kybba)	Pentz; De Jong; Walsh; Francesco De Nigris; Reanno Gordon; Daniel Boutin; Sebastian Del Gallego Fernandez	Diplo; Kybba; Beatz; BomboCat	2:12
4.	"Jump & Twist" (featuring America Foster and DJ Chipman)	Pentz; Eric Lopez; Foster; Elijah Willie Brown; Walsh	Diplo; Ape Drums	2:28
5.	"Goat" (featuring Bunji Garlin and America Foster)	Pentz; Lopez; Walsh; Ali Stone; Foster; Bunji Garlin; De Jong	Diplo; Drums	3:01
6.	"Guayando" (featuring Tokischa)	Pentz; Jong; Tokischa Altagracia Peralta; Maffalda; Antonio Antmaper	Diplo; Beatz; Maffalda; Mulú	2:19
7.	"Peppa Pot" (featuring America Foster)	Foster; Pentz; Walsh; Amanda Ibanez; Vincent Jimenez; Lopez	Major Lazer	2:24
8.	"Mini Skirt"	Stone; Akira Evans; Pentz; Leighton Walsh; Ashante Reid; Eric Lopez; Richard Cook Mears IV; Beau Knox; Mick Kenney (uncredited)	Diplo; Beau Knox; Nitti Gritti; Kordhell (uncredited)	3:05
9.	"Pendulum" (featuring America Foster)	Foster; Jimenez; Ibanez; Maffalda; Pentz; Walsh; Lopez	Diplo; Ape Drums; Maffalda	2:09
Total length:				22:51

Notes

- "Gangsta" contains an interpolation of "Ready or Not Here I Come (Can't Hide from Love)" (1968), written by Thom Bell and William Hart, as performed by The Delfonics.
- "Mini Skirt" features uncredited production and songwriting by Kordhell.
