= Caribbean Music Awards =

- Awarded for: achievements in Caribbean music and culture
- Venue: Kings Theatre in Brooklyn, New York (2023-2025); National Academy for the Performing Arts in Trinidad and Tobago (2026)
- Presented by: Caribbean Elite Group
- First award: August 31, 2023
- Website: caribmusicawards.com

Television/radio coverage
- Network: BET (2025)

The Caribbean Music Awards are an annual awards ceremony presented by the Caribbean Elite group. Between 2023 and 2025, they were held at the Kings Theatre in Brooklyn, New York. In 2026, they were held at the National Academy for the Performing Arts in Trinidad and Tobago. The ceremony recognizes artists from a range of Caribbean music genres.

== History ==
A Caribbean Music Awards show was held throughout the 1990s, primarily in the Apollo Theater in Harlem. By 1999, the show had ended.

A new Caribbean Music Awards show was held for the first time on August 31, 2023, at the Kings Theatre, in Brooklyn, New York. Co-founded by Dane Taylor, Monique Blake, and Prince Forde, it is produced by the Caribbean Elite Group. The awards seek to showcase the full spectrum of Caribbean music, including music that is not typically recognized in mainstream music awards ceremonies. Blake stated: "Usually, our artists have to squeeze into one category. We wanted to help change that." Twenty six categories were awarded, and the ceremony was live streamed on YouTube. After the ceremony, chutney soca artists Ravi B and KI Persad called for the organizers to recognize their genre in a future ceremony. The following year, the event awarded more than 40 categories, adding new categories to recognize genres like chutney soca and bouyon.

In 2025, Patrice Roberts won Female Soca Artist of the Year for the third year in a row. A new category for Zess Steam Artist of the Year was created and awarded to Lady Lava. For the first time, the ceremony was broadcast on TV, two weeks afterwards on BET. A week after the ceremony, the organizers told Kranium he was mistakenly awarded Caribbean R&B Artist of the Year and that the award actually belonged to Dexta Daps. In a social media post, he threw away the trophy and criticized the organizers.

From 2023 to 2025, the awards show was held at the Kings Theatre, in Flatbush, a Brooklyn neighborhood with a significant Caribbean population. It occurred a few days before the West Indian Day Parade. In 2026, they were held at the National Academy for Performing Arts in Trinidad and Tobago. At least 40 categories are awarded, including a Lifetime Achievement Award and awards recognizing artists in genres such as reggae, calypso, soca, konpa, zouk, and dancehall. According to their website, awards are determined in a multi-stage process that includes public voting, industry data, and an advisory board.

== Ceremonies ==
Date	Lifetime achievement	Selected awards	Host(s)	Venue	Ref
31 August 2023	Machel Montano	People's Choice: Kes; Male soca artist: Machel Montano; Male Reggae Artist: Beres Hammond; Humanitarian award: Buju Banton; Dancehall/reggae collaboration: "Likkle Miss" by Skeng and Nicki Minaj	Wyclef Jean	Kings Theatre	
29 August 2024	Marcia Griffiths	Male Soca Artist: Skinny Fabulous; Female Soca Artist: Patrice Roberts; Producer award: Di Genius; Dancehall performer: Dexta Daps; Legacy: Cedella Marley; Chutney soca: Ravi B	Spice and Majah Hype	Kings Theatre	
28 August 2025	Bounty Killer	Most awards: Shenseea; Female Soca Artist: Patrice Roberts; Zess Steam Artist: Lady Lava; Elite icon: Busta Rhymes; Humanitarian: Sizzla; Female reggae artist: Lila Iké	Majah Hype	Kings Theatre	
19 September 2026	Patra	Female soca artist: Lady Lava; Female Dancehall artist: Shenseea; Soca song of the year: "The Greatest Bend Over" by Full Blown; Best new soca artist: Coutain; Reggae album: Exile by Chronixx	Nailah Blackman and Majah Hype	National Academy for the Performing Arts	
