= Coutain =

Musician from Trinidad and Tobago

- Born: Denzil Coutain; 1996 (age 29–30); Sangre Grande, Trinidad and Tobago
- Genre: soca music, reggae, R&B
- Instrument: vocals
- Years active: 2019–present
- Award: Caribbean Music Awards Best New Soca Artist (2026)
- Website: www.instagram.com/coutain.xx

Denzil Coutain, known professionally as Coutain, is a Trinidadian soca musician. First gaining attention in 2019 with the song "African Dancer", he released more hit songs after he began collaborating with producer Michael “Tano” Montano. He has been nominated for four Caribbean Music Awards, winning Best New Soca Artist in 2026. Coutain has been praised for his vocals, and his style encompasses a range of genres including reggae, calpyso, soul, soca, and R&B.

== Early life and education ==
Denzil Coutain was born in Sangre Grande, Trinidad and Tobago, in 1996. His family members Jimmy October and 80sede are also musicians. When Coutain was 13, his cousin heard him sing and pushed him to pursue music. He attended high school at Sangre Grande Educational Institute, where he participated in talent shows, and graduated from Holy Cross College.

== Musical career ==
Coutain first gained attention in 2019 with the song "African Dancer", which features the acoustic guitar. He had recorded the song a few years earlier but did not release it because he was feeling indecisive about pursuing a musical career. Coutain continued to release songs over the next few years including "3:03 (Freestyle)" and "Pray for Me". He released Product of Big Blood in 2020 and G Syde Tape, Pt. 3 in 2022 with Brooklyn Decent.

In May 2024, he released his debut album 1996 on Form and Order. Produced by Neel "Dwala" Dhorajiwala, the album has 16 tracks, many of which are about love. The song "Artform" stayed at #1 on the Apple Music Trinidad & Tobago chart for almost a month in late 2024, and the music video had above a million views on YouTube by January 2025. Caribbean Beat praised the album as "sublime and edgy". Coutain also contributed vocals to "Cocoa Tea" by Kes.

Coutain began working with producer Michael “Tano” Montano, who is known as the "Hitmaker". Their collaboration, which has been called "magic" and "creative chemistry", led to more hit songs for Coutain. In 2023, Coutain and Tano released a kaiso and soca song "Junction", which charted on the Apple Music Trinidad and Tobago chart. Coutain's song "JamTown" was featured on Tano's Heroes Riddim (2025). It features the lyric: "Hot and groovy, look what soca do to we". In early January 2025, the song opened at #91 on the Apple Music Trinidad & Tobago chart, rising to #9 by the end of the month. At that time he also had 4 other songs on the chart: "Artform", "Junction", "Riddim", and "Bloodaz".

In 2026, Coutain and Tano released the song "Wedding Band", which was inspired by the 1968 song "Mr. Walker" by Mighty Sparrow. In Coutain's version, he addresses Mrs. Walker instead of Mr. Walker, asking for her blessing to marry her daughter. Kes cited the song as an example of the lasting influence of traditional soca music on newer artists. Tano's Blockbuster Riddim (2026) featured Coutain's song "Blockbuster" as well as songs by GBM Nutron, Kes, Full Blown, and Mical Teja. Coutain supported Kes on part of the 2026 Roots, Rock, Soca Tour. Caribbean Beat included him in a list of 5 rising soca musicians, and Ebony included him on their "Gentlemen of Sound" list. He was featured in Billboard as the "Caribbean Up-And-Comer of the Month" for September 2026.

Coutain was nominated for three 2026 Caribbean Music Awards, including best new soca artist and soca video of the year for "Jamtown". He won the award for best new soca artist.

=== Style ===
Coutain's vocals have been praised as "infectious","honey", and "sweet". His music style encompasses a range of genres including reggae, calpyso, soul, soca, and R&B. His influences include Lord Kitchener, Black Stalin, Lord Nelson, Bob Marley, WizKid, Burna Boy, and Wu Tang Clan.

== Discography ==
- Product of Big Blood (2020)
- G SYDE TAPE, Pt. 3 (2022) with Brooklyn Decent
- 1996 (2024)

== Awards and nominations ==
Year	Awards	Category	Work	Result	Ref.
2025	Caribbean Music Awards	Best New Soca Artist	—N/a	Nominated	
2026	Caribbean Music Awards	Best New Soca Artist	—N/a	Won	
2026	Caribbean Music Awards	Soca Video of the Year	"Jamtown" (with Tano)	Nominated	
2026	Caribbean Music Awards	Soca Impact Award	—N/a	Nominated	
