= Devika (name) =

Devika is a given name and surname. Notable people with that name include the following:

== Given name ==
- Devika, (1943 – 2002), Indian actress
- Devika Bandana, Nepalese singer
- Devika Bhagat (born 1979), Indian screenwriter
- Devika Bhise, American actress
- Devika Chawla, Indian singer
- Devika Palshikar (born 1979), Indian cricketer
- Devika Parikh (born 1966), American actress
- Devika Rani (1908 – 1994), Indian actress
- Devika Vaidya (born 1997), Indian cricketer
- Devika Nambiar, Indian actress and television presenter
- Devika Sanjay, Indian actress

People From The Epics

- Devika (Mahabharat), daughter of Govasana, wife of Yudhishthira and mother of Yaudheya in Mahabharata

== Middle name ==
- Cindy Devika Sharma, Trinidad and Tobago politicians

== Surname ==
- J. Devika, Malayali historian
- Methil Devika (born 1976), Indian dance

== See also ==
- Davika Hoorne
