= François Lejeune =

François Lejeune may refer to:

- Jean Effel (1908–1982, real name François Lejeune), French painter, caricaturist, illustrator and journalist
- Louis-François Lejeune (1775–1848), French general, painter, and lithographer
