= Isaiah James Boodhoo =

Trinidadian painter and writer

Isaiah James Boodhoo (1932 – 2 February 2004) was a Trinidadian painter and writer.

Born in the northeastern town of Sangre Grande in Trinidad, Boodhoo received a governmental scholarship in 1958 which allowed him to study art at England's Brighton College of Art; there, he studied disciplined, formal techniques. By his return home in 1964, his style was non-objective, typical of the period. In 1968 he again received the opportunity to study abroad, this time at Central Washington University and Indiana University. Here he was introduced to Abstract Expressionism. He also encountered disillusionment with the Vietnam War, which was to inform his later work.

Upon his return to Trinidad, Boodhoo developed the idea of using his art for social and political commentary; his first exhibition, at the National Gallery in Port of Spain in 1970, was strongly influenced by local turmoil, and he was deeply critical of prime minister Eric Williams in some of his work. Boodhoo exhibited only twice more, once taking themes from the poetry of Derek Walcott, until his "Caroni" series of 1992.

Boodhoo's late paintings, in a more lyrically abstract vein, were inspired by the sugar industry of Caroni Ltd., and he used its sugarcane fields and cutters as the basis for the so-called "Caroni" series. His last works took as their subject the symbols of Hinduism.

Boodhoo "was also an accomplished writer, whose novel Between Two Seasons was published in 1994."

Boodhoo was a member of the Art Society of Trinidad and Tobago. He died in 2004.

The Isaiah Boodhoo Collection is held at The Alma Jordan Library, Special Collections, The University of the West Indies, St Augustine campus, Trinidad and Tobago. The collection includes a manuscript for his novel Between Two Seasons.
