= Eifel Park (disambiguation) =

Eifelpark is a wildlife and leisure park in Gondorf near Bitburg in the Eifel mountains of Germany.

Eifel Park may also refer to:

- Eifel National Park, a park in North Rhine-Westphalia, Germany
- Volcanic Eifel Nature Park, a park in Rhineland-Palatinate, Germany
- Vulkanland Eifel Geopark, a park in Germany
- High Fens – Eifel Nature Park, a German-Belgian park

== See also ==
- Champ de Mars, the park that contains the Eiffel Tower in Paris, France
