= Michelle Samuel-Foo =

American biologist

Michelle Susan Samuel-Foo
- Born: Sangre Grande
- Education: University of Georgia; Brewton–Parker College
- Awards: Entomological Society of America Founders' Memorial Award
- Scientific career
- Workplaces: University of Florida; Alabama State University
- Thesis: Genetic analyses of Hessian fly resistance in KS 94U275 (2003)

Michelle Susan Samuel-Foo is an American biologist and Assistant Professor of Biology at Alabama State University. She serves as President of the Southeastern Entomological Society of America. In 2020 Samuel-Foo became the first African-American person to win a major award for entomology when she was awarded the Entomological Society of America Founders' Memorial Recognition.

== Early life and education ==
Samuel-Foo is from Sangre Grande, Trinidad and Tobago. Her parents were cash crop growers, and she helped them to sell vegetables in markets. Samuel-Foo started college determined to study biology, but became fascinated by the world of entomology. She graduated summa cum laude in Biology from Brewton–Parker College, where she was awarded a scholarship. She decided to stay in academic research after a conversation with the school's head of science, David McMillin, who encouraged her to look for graduate schools. She was a graduate student at the University of Georgia, where she studied the resistance of Triticum aestivatum (common wheat) to Mayetiola destructor (hessian fly). At the time, she was one of only two minority students in the department. Her dissertation committee was chaired by H. Roger Boerma, who was well known for the Soybean Improvement Programme. After graduating, Samuel-Foo joined the programme, which is where she first experienced DNA sequencing and molecular breeding.

== Research and career ==
In 2009 Samuel-Foo joined the faculty at the University of Florida. Here she worked to support the registration of speciality crops in the Southern States and Puerto Rico. She was made regional field coordinator of the United States Department of Agriculture Interregional Research Project No. 4 (IR-4) Project. From 2015 to 2017 Samuel-Foo served as President of the International Association of Black Entomologists and on the Board of Directors of the Caribbean Food Crops Society.

Samuel-Foo joined the faculty of Alabama State University in 2018, where she leads the programme on industrial hemp research. When she arrived at Alabama State University she established an urban teaching garden that looks to introduce students to sustainable agriculture.

In 2020 Samuel-Foo was named President-Elect of the Southeastern Entomological Society of America. She provided expert guidance to the United States congress on the Murder Hornet Eradication Act, which looks to eliminate the Asian giant hornet (so-called murder hornet), an invasive species that is predatory to honey bees. In her testimony, Samuel-Foo spoke about the devastating impact of the murder hornets on the United States honey bee population, as well as their potential threat to critical agriculture. In May 2020 Samuel-Foo was awarded the Entomological Society of America Founders' Memorial prize, and dedicated her award lecture to the research of Ernest J. Harris. Harris was the first Black entomologist to be the subject of the Founders' lecture.
