= Sangre Grande =

Coordinates: 10°34′00″N 61°08′00″W

- Town
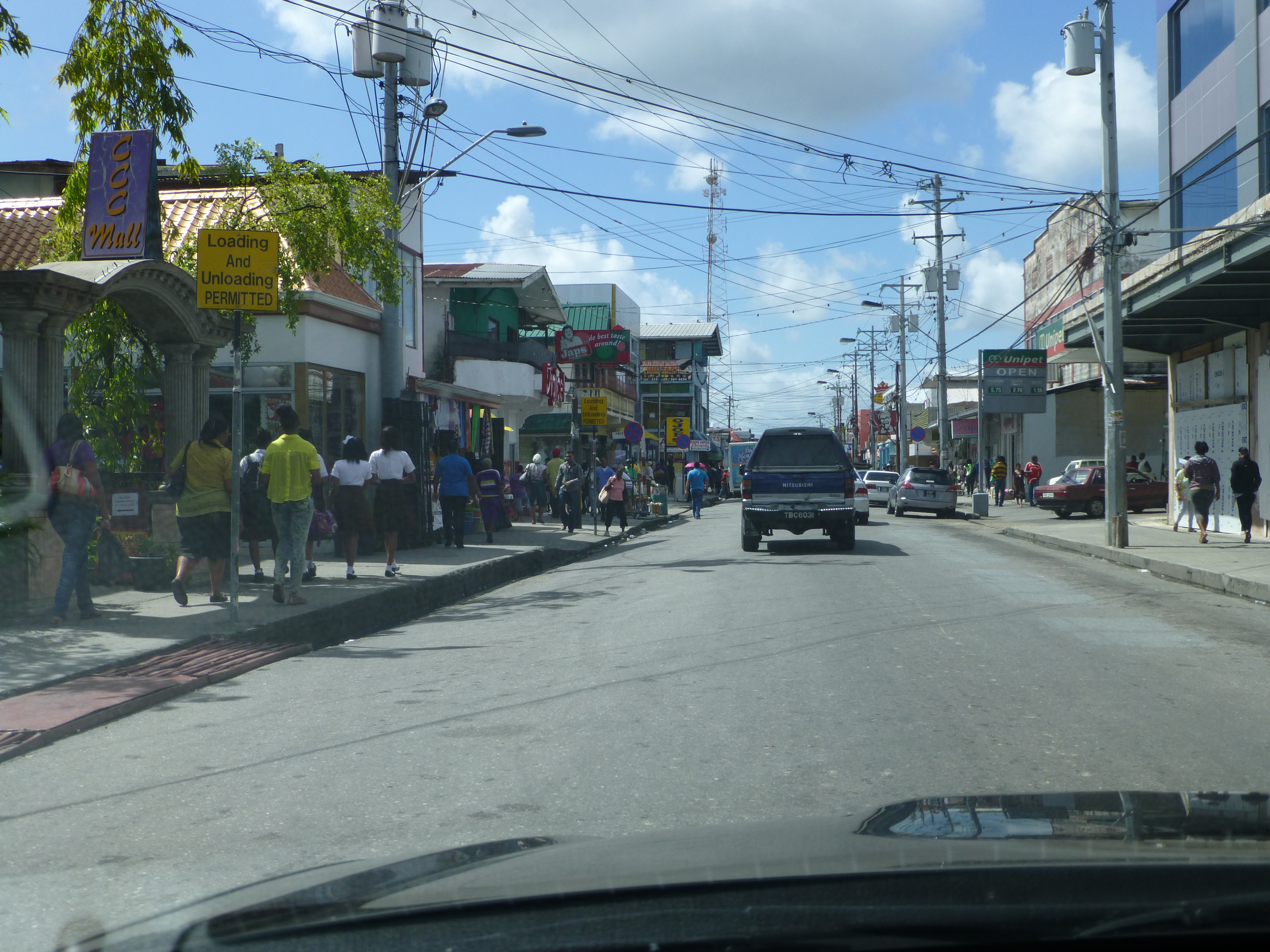
- Eastern Main Road, Sangre Grande
- Nickname: Grandee
- Interactive map of Sangre Grande
- Country: Trinidad and Tobago
- Region: Sangre Grande
- Settled: c. 1770

Population (2011)
  - Total: 18,127
  - Rank: 9th
- Demonym: Sangre Grandian
- Time zone: UTC−4 (AST)
- Postal Code: 45xxxx
- Area codes: 668, 691

Sangre Grande is the largest town in northeastern Trinidad and Tobago. It is located east of Arima and southwest of the village of Toco. It is the seat of the Sangre Grande Regional Corporation and capital of the region.

== Overview and history ==
The name Sangre Grande means "big blood", and it has been suggested that the town was named for a battle that took place between the native Amerindians and the Spanish settlers. However, this interpretation is not supported by historical records. The true origin of the name refers to when, in the late 1770s, Spanish surveyors who were charting the island for the purposes of creating a map, found that the waters of two of the tributaries of the nearby Oropouche River were red as blood, hence the name.

Similarly, the neighbouring town is called Sangre Chiquito ("small blood") is named for the presence of a smaller, similarly colored river in that town. Sangre Grande grew as a result of the growth of cacao cultivation in the late nineteenth century. It grew further when it became the terminus of the railroad. Construction of the railroad caused the town to migrate down the hill to meet the railroad. When the town relocated to the foot of the hill, the name Sangre Grande moved with it. As a result, the name of the pre-existing village, Cunapo, was largely, but not entirely, lost.

== Climate ==
Sangre Grande has a tropical rainforest climate according to the Köppen climate classification, characterized by high temperatures and rainfall. Temperatures climb to a maximum of around 30 °C throughout the year, hovering at a low of around 23 °C at night in summer and 19 °C in winter. Temperatures outside of the immediate town center are usually around 2-3 °C lower due to abundant moisture and cloud clover of the lush surrounding forest. Rainfall is heavy all year, but especially so June through December, peaking in November at 342mm, and being at its driest in March with 88mm.

Climate data for Sangre Grande
Month	Jan	Feb	Mar	Apr	May	Jun	Jul	Aug	Sep	Oct	Nov	Dec	Year
Mean daily maximum °C (°F)	29.3 (84.7)	29.8 (85.6)	30.4 (86.7)	31.2 (88.2)	31.0 (87.8)	30.3 (86.5)	30.0 (86.0)	30.6 (87.1)	30.9 (87.6)	30.7 (87.3)	30.4 (86.7)	29.8 (85.6)	30.4 (86.7)
Daily mean °C (°F)	24.9 (76.8)	25.1 (77.2)	25.7 (78.3)	26.5 (79.7)	26.9 (80.4)	26.5 (79.7)	26.3 (79.3)	26.5 (79.7)	26.6 (79.9)	26.5 (79.7)	26.1 (79.0)	25.4 (77.7)	26.1 (79.0)
Mean daily minimum °C (°F)	19.0 (66.2)	20.5 (68.9)	21.0 (69.8)	21.9 (71.4)	22.9 (73.2)	22.8 (73.0)	22.6 (72.7)	22.4 (72.3)	22.4 (72.3)	22.4 (72.3)	21.9 (71.4)	20.6 (69.1)	21.9 (71.4)
Average rainfall mm (inches)	156 (6.1)	105 (4.1)	88 (3.5)	107 (4.2)	146 (5.7)	304 (12.0)	318 (12.5)	315 (12.4)	238 (9.4)	303 (11.9)	342 (13.5)	258 (10.2)	2,680 (105.5)
Source: Climate-Data.org

== Infrastructure ==
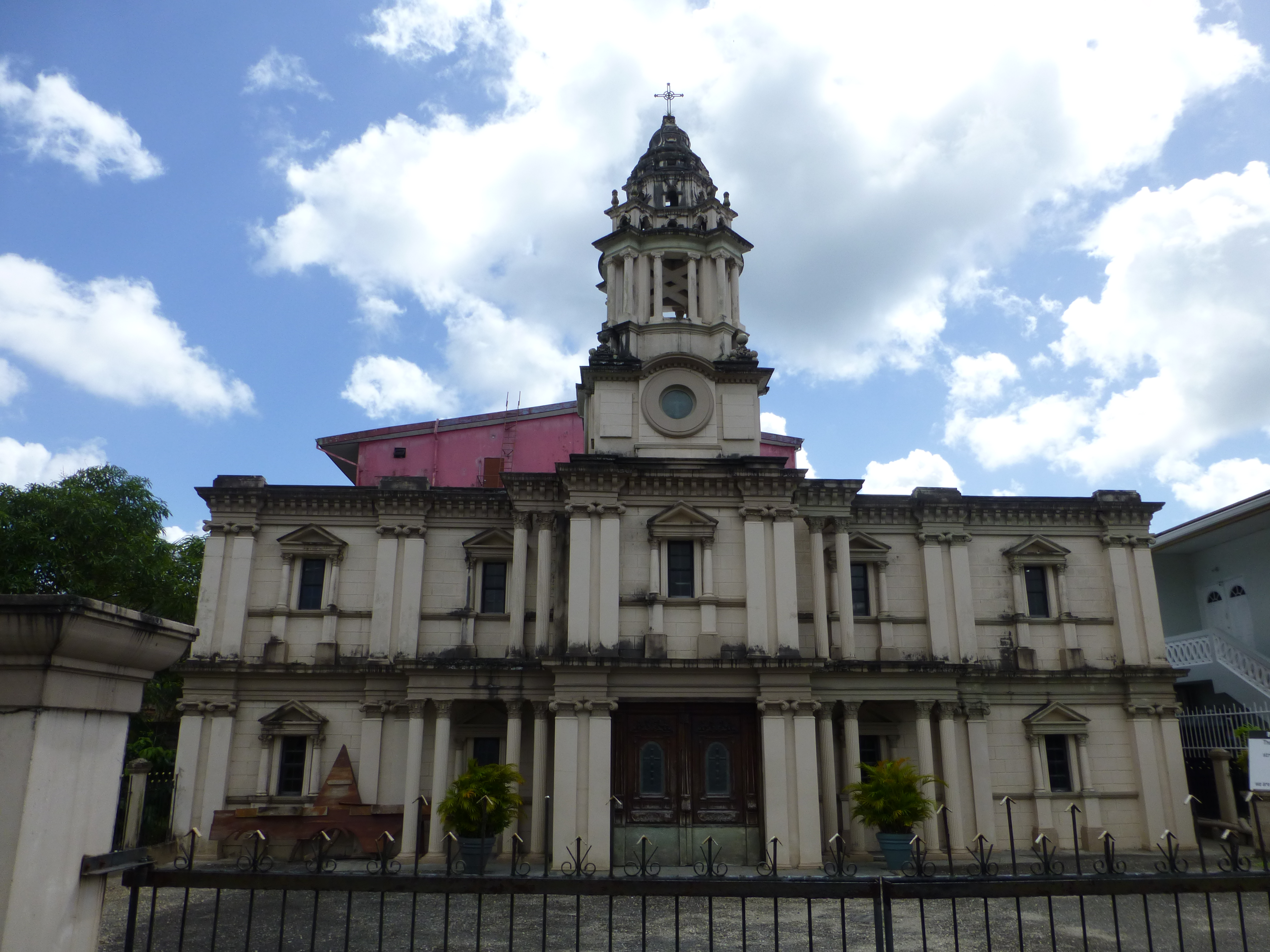
Mennonite church

Sangre Grande is more developed than its surrounding areas. Many residents from surrounding areas depend on Sangre Grande for Government facilities as well as for shopping. Many residents in surrounding villages also come to Sangre Grande as a means of getting transportation to larger towns for example Arima and Port of Spain.

=== Healthcare ===
Sangre Grande has both a Government hospital (located on Ojoe Road) and a Government Health Clinic.

=== Transportation ===
The Eastern Main Road is the most important road leading into Sangre Grande as the Churchill Roosevelt Highway ends in Wallerfield. The Eastern Main Road connects Sangre Grande to the east to Sangre Chiquito and Manzanilla and to the west to Arima and Port of Spain. The second major road in Toco Road connects Sangre Grande to villages in the northeast, for example Toco and Matelot.

=== Railroad ===
The railways in Trinidad closed in the late 20th century, but many traces of the railroad's passage through Sangre Grande still exist. The current Public Transport Service Corporation (PTSC) terminal was formerly the train station. Additionally, tracks leading into Sangre Grande have been converted into roads, although it still bears the name of Railway Road. However, with growing road traffic congestion on the nation's roads, there are plans in to introduce a rapid rail whose first stage of development will stretch from Sangre Grande to Port of Spain.

=== Bus ===
Buses still ply the routes in and out of Sangre Grande. The bus terminus in the heart of Sangre Grande was recently upgraded.

=== Maxi taxi ===
Maxi taxis as well as traditional taxis service Sangre Grande. The Maxi taxis were first situated in the vicinity of the PTSC bus terminus, however the busyness of this location combined with the growing number of Maxi taxis had exacerbated traffic problems in the area and the old PTSC service station and washing bay on Brierly Street was converted to a maxi taxi hub instead. Here, Maxi taxis heading to both Arima and Port of Spain can be found.

== Education ==
As in the rest of the country, Sangre Grande is home to primary and secondary schools which fall into three categories: Government-run, Government-assisted and private. In Sangre Grande there are 2 private secondary schools and one private primary school.

=== Primary schools ===
Government-run primary schools:

- Guaico Government Primary School
- North Oropouche Government Primary School
- Sangre Grande Government Primary School

Government-assisted primary schools:

- Caigual R.C. Primary School
- Cunapo (St. Francis) R.C. School
- Fishing Pond Presbyterian Primary School
- Grosvenor Presbyterian Primary School
- Guaico Presbyterian Primary School
- North Oropouche R.C. School
- Sangre Chiquito Presbyterian Primary School
- Sangre Grande Hindu Primary School
- Sangre Grande S.D.A. Primary School
- Upper Sangre Grande R.C. School

Private Primary Schools:

- SWAHA Tulsi Manas Primary School

=== Secondary schools ===
Government-run secondary schools:

- Guaico Secondary School
- Northeastern College
- Sangre Grande Secondary School

Private secondary schools:

- Sangre Grande Educational Institute
- Bates Memorial S.D.A. High School

Government-assisted Secondary Schools:

- SWAHA Hindu College

== Notable persons ==
- John Agitation - comedian
- Ravi B - singer
- Isaiah James Boodhoo - painter
- Anisa Mohammed - cricketer
- Michelle Samuel-Foo - scientist
- Cindy Devika Sharma - senator
- Coutain - musician

== Sports ==
Sangre Grande is home to many sports teams that take part in national competition such as the North East Stars football team and the Sangre Grande All Stars basketball team, Team Elite Karate.

== Steel orchestras ==
Sangre Grande is also home to the Sangre Grande Cordettes which has been a mainstay panside in the area for many years. The band often makes the national finals of the Panorama competition, where it currently competes in the medium band category. The band's music used to be arranged by one of the most famous pan arrangers in Trinidad, Jit Samaroo. For the past few years, the band has had a new secret weapon, choosing the wildcard arranger from Denmark, Anders Kappel to carry it forward into the panorama competition.

Other bands exist in the area, including the Tamana Pioneers (small band category). Several schoolbands in the area also participate in the school panorama competition every year.
