= Sangre Grande Secondary School =

Sangre Grande Secondary School To Live is to Learn

Location
- Graham Trace, Ojoe Road, Sangre Grande, Trinidad, West Indies; Sangre Grande, St.Andrew; Trinidad and Tobago; 10.5992°N 61.1269°W

Information
- Type: Government run
- Motto: To Live is to Learn
- Established: 3 September 1973
- School district: North-East District
- Principal: Mr.Shazard Mohammed
- Teaching staff: 56
- Enrollment: 900
- Campus: Urban
- Colours: Grey, White, Green and Gold
- Accreditation: TTAC

Sangre Grande Secondary School (formerly Sangre Grande Junior Secondary School) is a government-run secondary school in Sangre Grande, Trinidad and Tobago. The school was a 3-year school up to 2006, since then it has transitioned into a five-year secondary school. It consists of a student population of approximately 400 boys and 500 girls.

== Curriculum ==
Consisting of 30 and more subjects, including business subjects, science subjects and general studies.

Forms 1 - 3: English A, English Literature, Mathematics, Integrated Science, Social Studies, Spanish, VAPA ( Art / Craft, Drama, Physical Education, Technology Education, Information Technology, Remedial English.

Forms 4 - 5: English A, English Literature, Mathematics, Chemistry, Biology, Human and Social Biology, Integrated Science, Agricultural Science, Social Studies, Spanish, Principles of Accounts, Principles of Business, Physical Education, Geography, Information Technology, Visual Arts, Music, Food and Nutrition, Clothing and Textile, Home Economics, Home Management, Technical Drawing, Mechanical Engineering Technology, Office Administration, Electronic Document Processing and Management (EDPM) .
