= SadBoi =

- Also known as: Ebhoni
- Born: Ebhoni Jade Cato-O'Garro; December 5, 1999 (age 26)
- Origin: Toronto, Ontario, Canada
- Genres: Alternative R&B; dancehall; reggae; soca
- Occupations: Singer; songwriter; model
- Labels: Love Renaissance; True Panther (former)

Ebhoni Jade Cato-O'Garro, known by her stage name SadBoi and formerly known as Ebhoni, is a Canadian musician and model of Antiguan, Jamaican, and Indigenous descent. She released her debut EP Mood Ring (2017), at the age of 17. Her EP X was released on February 18, 2021.

== Early life ==
Ebhoni grew up in Toronto's Weston Road neighbourhood, before moving to Oshawa with her mother and sister after her parents divorced. As of 2019, she lived in Parkdale. Ebhoni entered her first singing competition at the age of nine at the Canadian National Exhibition. She began recording music at age 10 and started writing songs at age 11. She started uploading videos to YouTube including covers of songs by artists such as Beyoncé and Keyshia Cole, as well as original songs. She has also modeled for Adidas and Rihanna's Savage X Fenty lingerie line.

== Musical career ==
In 2017, she released her EP Mood Ring on SoundCloud, where it would receive over 2 million streams. She then released an EP titled X in February 2021 and a mixtape titled Good Dick & Weed in July 2021.

== Discography ==
=== Extended plays ===
- Mood Ring (2017)
- X (2021)
- Were All the Ig Girls Worth It? (2022)
- watch it all fall (2024)
- Baddies (2024)

=== Mixtapes ===
- Good Dick & Weed (2021)

=== Albums ===
- BARE CHAT (2024)
- DRY CRY (2024)
