= North Eastern College =

Northeastern College

Location
- Graham Trace, Ojoe Road; Sangre Grande; Trinidad and Tobago
- Coordinates: 10°35′59″N 61°7′43″W

Information
- School type: Secondary School
- Motto: Studiorum Sedes Dulcium Amoena
- Denomination: At Northeastern College various Faiths are practised such as Christianity, Hinduism and Islam.
- Established: 1961
- Authority: The Ministry of Education of Trinidad & Tobago
- School code: 160036
- Principal: Mrs. Cislyn Charles-Maxwell
- Gender: Male and Female
- Age range: 11-19
- Enrollment: 1000 + students
- Classes: 29
- Average class size: 35
- Language: English and Spanish
- Hours in school day: Approximately 7
- Classrooms: 60 (Inclusive of form classes and various subject rooms)
- Houses: Aripo, Cumberland, Tamana, Trinity
- Colours: Black and white
- Slogan: S.P.I.C.E.M.S
- Sports: Basketball, Badminton, Cricket, Dragon Boating, Football, Netball, Track & Field
- Nickname: North, N.E.C
- Team name: Northeastern College
- Newspaper: The N.E.C. Buzz

Northeastern College is a government co-educational secondary school. The school is located in the town of Sangre Grande, on the northeastern side of the island of Trinidad, Trinidad and Tobago.

The school is referred to as a college because it offers seven years (five are to prepare students for Caribbean Examinations Council examinations) of education, of which the last two years (the sixth form) are optional.

Whilst attending Northeastern College, with the exception of mid-term exams and end-of-term exams, there are two to three major exams depending on which year group a student is in. From the third form (year) students are prepared for the National Certificate of Secondary Education exam which is given by the Ministry of Education. The next major exams are CSEC given in the 5th year and CAPE which is given to the year 6 students (these exams are not under the control of the Trinidadian government but instead the examination body Caribbean Examinations Council).

Northeastern College is made up of a student population of approximately 500 males and 600 females.

== History ==
Before NEC became North Eastern College, the school started off as Sangre Grande Secondary Modern School on Tuesday 9 May 1961. It was to provide secondary education for 3 years, and the 4th and 5th years students would have continued with a traditional education or to a vocational school. On Tuesday 9 May 1961, Registration Day, when parents were told this many of them threatened to withdraw their children and even suggested that the government upgrade the 2 private secondary schools in Sangre Grande because the students at these two schools were writing Cambridge G.C.E. 'O' Level exams. The parents led a delegation to the Ministry of Education and later on the same day, Mr. RALPH LALTOO, the 1st Principal made these suggestions: 1. Remove the 3 year limitation and make a 5 year school with the possibility of adding a 6th Form. 2. Make provision from 3rd Form to add Sciences, Languages and Modern Studies. 3. Gradually introduce at the 3rd Form level, Vocational Subjects e.g Agriculture, Home Economics, Carpentry 4. All courses, traditional and 'modern' to be subject to the rigorous standard of examinations. As a result of this by Wednesday 10 May 1961, the school was reborn as Sangre Grande Gov't Secondary and continued as such until September 1962 when it was 'christened' Northeastern College. The first intake was 105 students and they were placed in 3 forms- 1A, 1B and 1C according to the results. 35 students were placed in each class. The exam written to gain entry was called 'THE COMMON ENTRANCE EXAMINATION, 1961, FOR MODERN SECONDARY SECTION OF COMPREHENSIVE SCHOOL, SANGRE GRANDE.' The 105 students wrote the same exam to enter NEC. The first 35 students were placed in 1A, the second 35 students were placed in 1B and the third 35 students were placed in 1C. Mr.Laltoo's vision at that time was that the 35 students placed in 1A will write the Cambridge G.C.E.'O' Level Exams in 4 years (1965). Everyone was not the same age. Many of the students were between the ages of 11 – 13 years. Many of the students had also written the Government College exhibition exam and passed but were unable to secure a place in a secondary school. If you WON an Exhibition, you were guaranteed a place in a secondary school in Port-of-Spain but if you PASSED an Exhibition, you had to write the secondary schools' private entrance exam in order to get a place and at that time there was a lot of discrimination going on. Just a few students got Bursaries from Standard 6 to enter in Form 2. The 1st official Common Entrance exam was written in 1962 and students were chosen as such. The first year students ( 1961) were given free texts books in most subjects and there was no uniform. Students wore civilian clothing until Monday 3 July 1961 when the school uniform was worn publicly. The school had its first Open House on September 28, 1961. Parents and public were invited. The 2nd Open House and Public Assembly took place in September 1962. The Chief Education Officer at that time was Dr. V.C. Gocking and he was opposed to the changing of the name from Sangre Grande Gov't Sec. to NEC. Mr. Laltoo did it at his own risk and the wife of the incoming Minister of Education , Mrs. Wallace unveiled the new Coat of Arms displaying the name Northeastern College. Therefore, this is considered to be the formal opening of NEC.

== Curriculum ==
At Northeastern College approximately 30+ subjects are taught, with the majority being available to students after finishing their third year. The subjects can vary between business subjects, science subjects and general studies. A list of some of the classes available are:

- Additional Mathematics
- Agricultural Science
- Biology
- Building and Furniture Technology
- Caribbean History
- Chemistry
- Economics
- Electrical and Electronic Technology
- Electronic Document Preparation and Management
- English Language
- English Literature
- Geography
- Human and Social Biology
- Information Technology
- Integrated Science
- Mathematics
- Mechanical Engineering Technology
- Music
- Office Administration
- Physical Education and Sport
- Physics
- Principles of Accounts
- Principles of Business
- Religious instruction (not a subject, only a class)
- Social Studies
- Spanish
- Technical Drawing
- Theatre Arts
- Visual Arts
- Home Economics

== Extracurricular activities ==
Extracurricular activities at Northeastern College include basketball, badminton, cricket, dragon boating, football, netball and track and field. The following are a list of other extracurricular activities available at the school:

1. Hiking Club
2. Environmental Club (C.O.R.E)
3. Debate Club
4. Drama Club
5. Charity Club
6. Mathematics Club
7. Science Club
8. Astronomy Club
9. Cadets Force
10. Cheerleading
11. Student Counsel
12. School Band
13. Becoming a library prefect

Northeastern College was also once known for a vibrant folk choir that won many competitions throughout the country.

== House system ==
Northeastern College has four houses which are named after hills found within Trinidad:

Aripo (Named after El cerro del Aripo)

Colour: Yellow

Cumberland (Named after Cumberland Hills)

Colour:Red

Tamana (Named after Tamana Hills)

Colour:Green

Trinity(Name after Trinity Hills)

Colour:Blue

== Former principals ==
- Jesslyn Ramlal
- Arthur Antoine
- Annette Brizan
- Lionel Ramoutar
- Mr. Sieunarine
- Lyndon Barath
- Effel Mohammed
- Ralph C. Laltoo – founding principal
