= Lady Lava =

Music artist from Trinidad and Tobago

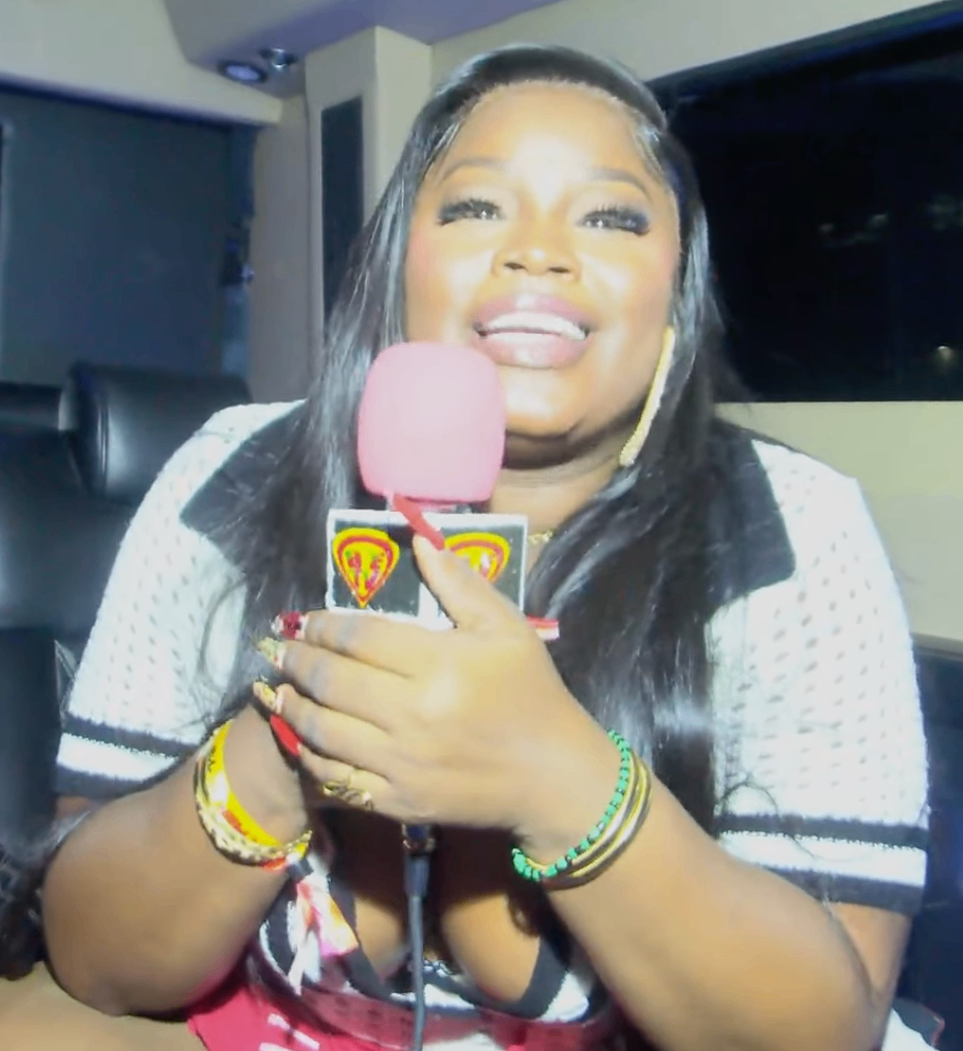
- Lady Lava in 2025

Background information
- Born: Keisha Harris; Cunupia, Trinidad and Tobago
- Genres: soca music; dancehall; rapso
- Instrument: vocals
- Years active: 2008–present
- Award: Zess/Steam Artist of the Year at the 2025 Caribbean Music Awards
- Website: instagram.com/ladylava_official

Keisha Harris, known professionally as Lady Lava, is a music artist from Trinidad and Tobago. She started recording music in 2008. In 2024, her song "Ring Finger" went viral, was co-signed by Cardi B, and helped her win Zess/Steam Artist of the Year at the Caribbean Music Awards. She received 9 nominations at the 2026 Caribbean Music Awards, the most of any nominee, and won 4 awards. Her music crosses multiple genres including zess, dancehall, steam, rapso, and soca. She is also known as "Queen of Steam" and "Queen of Freaks".

== Early life and education ==
Lady Lava was born Keisha Harris in Cunupia, Trinidad and Tobago. Her mother is from Fancy, Saint Vincent and the Grenadines. Lady Lava grew up in a religious family with 4 sisters and 3 brothers and sang in choir in church and school. She began writing poetry after she made a friend at church who was a poet. Inspired by Lady Saw, Lady Lava began turning her poems into dancehall songs. She graduated from secondary school at Carapichaima Senior Comprehensive.

== Career ==
Lady Lava began performing music as Queen Freak. Fans called her "lava", so she changed her stage name. At the same time, she worked as a street vendor in Chaguanas selling snacks, toys, and clothing. She recorded her first song in 2008. Beginning in 2017, she gained attention with her songs: "If You Beat It Keep It a Secret", "Secrets", and "Tail Light". Subsequently, her music career slowed a bit during the COVID-19 pandemic and the birth of her child. She ended a serious relationship to focus on music.

According to Lady Lava, she wrote her 2024 song "Ring Finger" during a difficult break-up with a man who was not interested in marriage. The song, which includes the line: "Yuh doh have a ring then yuh doh have a mister", has been likened to "Single Ladies" by Beyoncé. Featuring a riddim created by producer Aaron Duncan, the song went viral on TikTok and gained attention outside of Trinidad and Tobago. American rapper Cardi B praised the song on social media multiple times and attended one of Lady Lava's concerts in person in Brooklyn, New York. Cardi B also included it on an Apple Music playlist she created.

In March 2025, Lady Lava performed the song "Pepper Vine" with Machel Montano as part of his winning performance at the Chutney Soca Monarch competition. In a feature about soca, Billboard pointed to Lady Lava's "brash lyricism", stating that she is "ushering in a new era of soca for a younger audience." In August, she won a Caribbean Music Award for Zess/Steam Artiste of the Year largely based on the popularity of "Ring Finger". In November, she was featured on “What Is The Time” on the Major Lazer mixtape, GYALGEBRA.

Collaborating with Ravi B on "Cyah Pick", Lady Lava participated in the 2026 Chutney Soca Monarch competition and placed third. Billboard featured her as its June Caribbean Up-and-Comer of the month, and Caribbean Beat Magazine included her on a list of rising soca stars from Trinidad and Tobago. She received 9 nominations for the Caribbean Music Awards, the most of any nominee. She won 4 awards, including Female Soca Artist of the Year and Zess Artist of the Year, leading Billboard to call her "the reigning queen of Caribbean Music".

== Style ==
Lady Lava has been called the "Queen of Steam" and "Queen of Freaks". Her music crosses multiple genres including zess, dancehall, steam, rapso, and soca. She has stated: "I’m not afraid of any genre. It’s always my own style and flavour, just on a different beat." Her songs often feature themes of female empowerment.

== Awards and nominations ==
Year	Awards	Category	Work	Result	Ref.
2025	Caribbean Music Awards	Zess/Steam Artiste of the Year	—N/a	Won	
2025	Zikomo Africa Awards	Performer of the Year	—N/a	Won	
2026	Caribbean Music Awards	People's Choice	—N/a	Nominated	
2026	Caribbean Music Awards	Soca Performer of the Year	—N/a	Nominated	
2026	Caribbean Music Awards	Female Soca Artist of the Year	—N/a	Won	
2026	Caribbean Music Awards	Soca Impact Award	—N/a	Nominated	
2026	Caribbean Music Awards	Zess Song of the Year	"Bob the Builder"	Won	
2026	Caribbean Music Awards	Zess Song of the Year	"Send It Up" (with Lola Doll & Shawn Storm)	Nominated	
2026	Caribbean Music Awards	Zess Artist of the Year	—N/a	Won	
2026	Caribbean Music Awards	Chutney Soca Song of the Year	“Cya Pick” (with Ravi B)	Won	
2026	Caribbean Music Awards	Chutney Soca Song of the Year	“Pepper Vine” (with Machel Montano, DJ Private Ryan, Drupatee & Jus Now)	Nominated	
