= German trawler V 313 Eifel =

History
- Name: Marie Richardson (1929–36); Eifel (1936–54)
- Owner: Deutsche Fischerei Gesellschaft (1929–36); Norddeutsche Hochseefischerei (1936–41); Kriegsmarine (1941–45); Norddeutsche Hochseefischerei (1945–54)
- Port of registry: (Weimar Republic) Wesermünde, Germany (1929–33); (Nazi Germany) Wesermünde, Germany (1933–41); Kriegsmarine (1941–45); Wesermünde, Allied-occupied Germany (1945–49); Wesermünde, West Germany (1949-54)
- Builder: NV IJsselwerft
- Launched: 1929
- Completed: March 1930
- Commissioned: 20 April 1941
- Decommissioned: May 1945
- Out of service: 1954
- Identification: Code Letters KRSF (1930–34); Fishing boat registration PG 392 (1930–41); Code Letters DFBE (1934–54); Pennant Number V 313 (1941–45); Fishing boat registration BX 283 (1945–54)
- Fate: Scrapped

General characteristics
- Type: Fishing trawler (1929–41); Vorpostenboot (1941–45); Fishing trawler (1945–54)
- Tonnage: 290 GRT, 112 NRT
- Length: 41.45 m (136 ft 0 in)
- Beam: 7.25 m (23 ft 9 in)
- Draught: 3.65 m (12 ft 0 in)
- Depth: 3.98 m (13 ft 1 in)
- Installed power: Triple expansion steam engine, 96nhp
- Propulsion: Single screw propeller
- Speed: 10 knots (19 km/h)

Eifel was a German fishing trawler that was built in 1929 as Marie Richardson. Renamed Eifel in 1936, she was requisitioned by the Kriegsmarine in the Second World War for use as a Vorpostenboot, serving as V 313 Eifel. Returned to her owners post-war, she was scrapped in 1955.

== Description ==
The ship 41.45 metres (136 ft 0 in) long, with a beam of 7.25 metres (23 ft 9 in). She had a depth of 3.98 metres (13 ft 1 in) and a draught of 3.65 metres (12 ft 0 in). She was assessed at 290 GRT, 112 NRT. She was powered by a triple expansion steam engine, which had cylinders of 34 centimetres (13 1/2 in), 58 centimetres (23 in) and 94 centimetres (37 in) diameter by 66 centimetres (26 in) stroke. The engine was built by C. D. Holmes & Co., Hull, Yorkshire, United Kingdom. It was rated at 96nhp. It drove a single screw propeller. It could propel the ship at 10 knots (19 km/h).

== History ==
Marie Richardson was built by NV IJsselweft, Gorinchem, South Holland, Netherlands for Deutsche Fischerei Gesellschaft AG, Germany. She was launched in 1929 and completed in March 1930. The fishing boat registration PG 392 was allocated, as were the Code Letters KRSF. Her port of registry was Wesermünde In 1934, her Code Letters were changed to DFBE. In 1936, she was sold to the Norddeutscher Hochseefisherei.

She was scheduled to have participated in Unternehmen Seelöwe in 1940. On 20 April 1941, Eifel was requisitioned by the Kriegsmarine for use as a vorpostenboot. She was allocated to 3 Vorpostenflotille as V 313 Eifel. In 1945, she was returned to her owners. She arrived at W. Ritscher, Hamburg for scrapping on 28 December 1954.

== Sources ==
- Gröner, Erich (1993). Die deutschen Kriegsschiffe 1815-1945 (in German). Vol. 8/I: Flußfahrzeuge, Ujäger, Vorpostenboote, Hilfsminensucher, Küstenschutzverbände (Teil 1). Koblenz: Bernard & Graefe. ISBN 3-7637-4807-5.
