= Holy Cross College (Trinidad) =

Coordinates: 10.64847°N 61.28436°W

Holy Cross College is a government assisted, Roman Catholic secondary school situated on Calvary Hill, in the town of Arima, which is located north-east of Trinidad ( and Tobago).

== Description ==
Holy Cross College was started by the Dominican Order of Preachers in 1957 by the parish priest of Arima Canon Jeremiah Maher. Fr. Rev. Ignatius Candon was the college's first principal.

The Holy Cross College was first located on the corner of Woodford St. and Church St. It was formally the Ince's Property and that building was then used as quarters for the staff of the college. An Arcon building procured from Sprostons Ltd. was used as the temporary College Building. The college had an initial enrollment of 74 boys, because that was the amount the building could accommodate. From there the college was resituated at Calvary, Arima, where it stands today. The college in 2020 welcomed a new building. The building will cater for Sixth Form classes, a new multi-level block with new facilities like a physics lab, chemistry lab, physical education area, all with store rooms; a general lab, 13 classes, dean's office, cafeteria, with washrooms on each floor. An indoor auditorium will house a multi- purpose sports area, office, stage and back stage area with washrooms and changing rooms.
