= Eifel rule =

Phonological phenomenon in certain German dialects

The Eifel rule (German: Eifeler Regel German pronunciation: [ˈaɪfəlɐ ˈʁeːɡl̩], Luxembourgish: Eifeler [ˈɑɪ̯fəlɐ] or Äifler Reegel [ˈæːɪ̯flɐ ˈʀeːʑəl]) is a phonological phenomenon consisting in the deletion of morpheme-final [n] in certain contexts, originally documented in the dialects of the Eifel region in the far west of Germany during the late 19th century. This is a sandhi phenomenon and may or may not be reflected in spelling, depending on the language concerned.

More generally called n-deletion or n-apocope, it appears to varying extents in all dialects of the Western group of High German, including West Central German (notably Luxembourgish, Colognian and Hessian), High Franconian and Alemannic; and excludes all dialects of the Eastern group, such as Austro-Bavarian and the colonial dialects east of the Elbe-Saale line (including Standard German and Yiddish). N-apocope is a linguistic change originating in speech during the Middle High German period.

== West Central German ==
=== Luxembourgish ===
The Eifel rule is pervasive in Luxembourgish as -n is a common ending for verbs, plural nouns, inflected adjectives and function words. Since Luxembourgish spelling strives for phonetic accuracy, n-deletion is also reflected in the standard orthography. The rule can be described as follows:

- In the suffix -(e)n or -nn, as well as in function words (e.g. articles, pronouns, prepositions, conjunctions, adverbs), morpheme-final /n/ is deleted before a consonant both word-finally and word-internally, except before homorganic (i.e. apical) noncontinuants, i.e. /n t d ts tʃ dʒ/, and /h/. For example:
  - Word-finally: den + Ball → de Ball ("the ball"), wann + mer ginn → wa mer ginn ("when we go")
  - Word-internally: Dammen + Schong → Dammeschong ("women's shoes"), un + fänken → ufänken (“to start”)
- It is not deleted in the following contexts:
  - Before a vowel:
    den Apel ("the apple"), den Yves (male name), wann ech ginn ("when I go")
    Ouerenentzündung ("ear infection")
  - Before homorganic (i.e. apical) noncontinuants, i.e. /n t d ts tʃ dʒ/, and /h/:
    /n/: den Noper (“the neighbour”), vun New York (“from New York”)
    /t/: den Tuerm ("the tower")
    /d/: den Dag (“the day”), hien drénkt ("he drinks"), fënnefandrësseg ("thirty-five")
    /ts/ (possible spellings include z, c or ts): den Zuch (“the train”), en Cent (“a cent”), den Cäsar (“Caesar [Julius Caesar]”), den Tsunami (“the tsunami”), Gromperenzalot ("potato salad")
    /tʃ/ (possible spellings include tsch, ch or c): an Tschechien (“in Czechia”), den Chip (“the chip [microchip]”), den Churchill (“Churchill”), den Cello (“the cello”)
    /dʒ/ (possible spellings include dsch, j or g): den Dschungel (“the jungle”), en Job (“a job”), den Jazz (“jazz”), vun Jamaika (“from Jamaica”), den George Washington (“George Washington”)
    /h/: den Hond (“the dog”), wann hie schléift ("when he sleeps")
  - Before a pause, or in spelling before a punctuation mark:
    Ech hunn (wéi gëschter) vill geschafft. ("I have (like yesterday) done a lot of work.")
- Deletion is optional before the following function words beginning with s: the prounouns si/se/s' (“she/her; they/them”), sech (“himself/herself/itself/oneself; themselves”), säin (“his” [masculine singular]), seng (“his” [feminine singular or all genders plural]) and the adverb sou (“so”).

Note that the prefixes on- and in- are not affected by the Eifel rule, e.g. onvergiesslech ("unforgettable"), inkompetent (“incompetent”). At the same time, certain content words do undergo n-deletion, e.g. Wäi(n) (wine), Stee(n) (stone), geschwë(nn) (soon).

When final -n is dropped from a plural noun whose singular form ends in -e (which occurs mostly in loanwords), a diaeresis must be used to distinguish the plural, e.g.: Chance (singular [ˈʃɑ̃ːs]), Chancen (plural, full form [ˈʃɑ̃ːsən]), Chancë (plural + Eifel rule [ˈʃɑ̃ːsə]).

=== Colognian ===
In Colognian, the Eifel rule is of lesser impact than further south. This is due in part to slight morphological differences between the Moselle Franconian languages of the upper Eifel regions (High Eifel and Schneifel), and the Ripuarian languages of the North- and Vordereifel region and the Cologne Lowland, to which Colognian belongs.

There are several ways to write Colognian, and the Eifel rule may be reflected in writing when it follows phonetic reality, but more often is not, since the majority of people do not write very phonetically.

In comparison to standard German, Colognian is often described as having historically omitted the trailing n. This is oversimplified, and not always true. The Colognian version of liaison sometimes inserts an n. Colognian multisyllabic base words or lexemes regularly drop "-n" when some related languages, such as Standard German and Low German (but not Dutch and Limburgish) do not. Liaison is often optional, and there is hardly any liaison on stressed words within a sentence. For example, with the words bovve (up, up there) and en (in, into), one may build the phrase: bovve en der Schaaf (up there into the cupboard) which depending on stress and voice flow inside a complete sentence is spoken as either [ˈbɔ̂və ʔen dɐ ˈʃâːf] or [ˈbɔ̂vən‿en dɐ ˈʃâːf].

The general rule is that monosyllabic words most often keep their trailing n, while otherwise -en endings are transformed to -e in Colognian unless the following word starts with a glottal stop, a dental consonant, a vowel, or an h, and neither of the two words is being stressed inside the sentence. There are exceptions, the most notable being that speakers do not use liaison even if they could when speaking very slowly or solemnly, e.g. preaching or praying.

== High Franconian ==
High Franconian is a transitional dialect group between the Rhine Franconian dialects of West Central German to the North and the Swabian dialects of Alemannic to the South. The High Franconian group divides into South Franconian and East Franconian. N-apocope can be documented in the following sentence from Standard German:

- Die Kinder halte-n die Äpfel fest. "The children hold on to the apples."

The comparison with the above-mentioned dialects demonstrates:

- Rhine Franconian: Die Kinner halte die Äppel fescht.
- South Franconian: Die Kinner halte die Äpfel fescht.
- East Franconian: Die Kinner halte die Äpfel fest.
- Swabian: Die Kinner haltet die Äpfel fescht.

== Alemannic ==
The Eifel rule (Alemannic n-apocope) applies in all variants of Alemannic in the same fashion as described for Luxembourgish and is subject to the same exceptions. The earliest report on the phenomenon in Alemannic goes back to 1881.

- Certain Swiss German dialects also exhibit the Eifel rule. A comparison, in Zurich German, would be:
  - "Wötsch en Äpfe?" remains as "Wötsch en Äpfe?" ("Do you want an apple?"), but
  - "Wötsch en Gipfel?" changes to "Wötsch e Gipfel?" ("Do you want a croissant?").

== Low Franconian ==
Certain southern and southeastern dialects of Low Franconian (that is, Dutch) have a similar phenomenon. It is notable in Limburgish and some areas of Brabantian, and is called the "bdht-vowel-rule". Final -n is also deleted in these dialects, except when followed by b, d, h, t or a vowel, in case of a masculine noun. This is similar to the Eifel rule.

== Bibliography ==
- Gilles, Peter (2006), Moulin, Claudine; Nübling, Damaris (eds.), "Phonologie der n-Tilgung im Moselfränkischen ('Eifler Regel'). Ein Beitrag zur dialektologischen Prosodieforschung." (PDF), Perspektiven einer linguistischen Luxemburgistik. Studien zur Diachronie und Synchronie (in German), Heidelberg: Winter
- Cédric Krummes (2006), Alan Scott (ed.), "'Sinn si' or 'Si si'? Mobile 'n' Deletion in Luxembourgish.", Papers in Linguistics from the University of Manchester : Proceedings of the 15th Postgraduate Conference in Linguistics, 3 March 2006 (in German), Manchester: University - School of Languages, Linguistics and Cultures
  - online: Cote LB 55442
- Henri Muller (2010), "De finalen N", Lëtzebuerger Journal 2010, Nr. 10 (15. Januar): 7 (in German), Luxemburg
  - online: https://web.archive.org/web/20140501230739/http://massard.info/pdf/finalen_n.pdf
- François Schanen; Jacqui Zimmer (2006), "Chapitre 8", 1,2,3 Lëtzebuergesch Grammaire (in German), vol. Band 3: L'orthographe, Esch-sur-Alzette: Schortgen éditions, pp. 86–90
- Hermann Palms (2011), Mir schwäzze Platt : Dialekt und Grammatik untersucht am Steffeler Platt (in German), Steffeln: Eifelverein-Ortsgruppe Steffeln
