= National Academy for the Performing Arts =

- NAPA
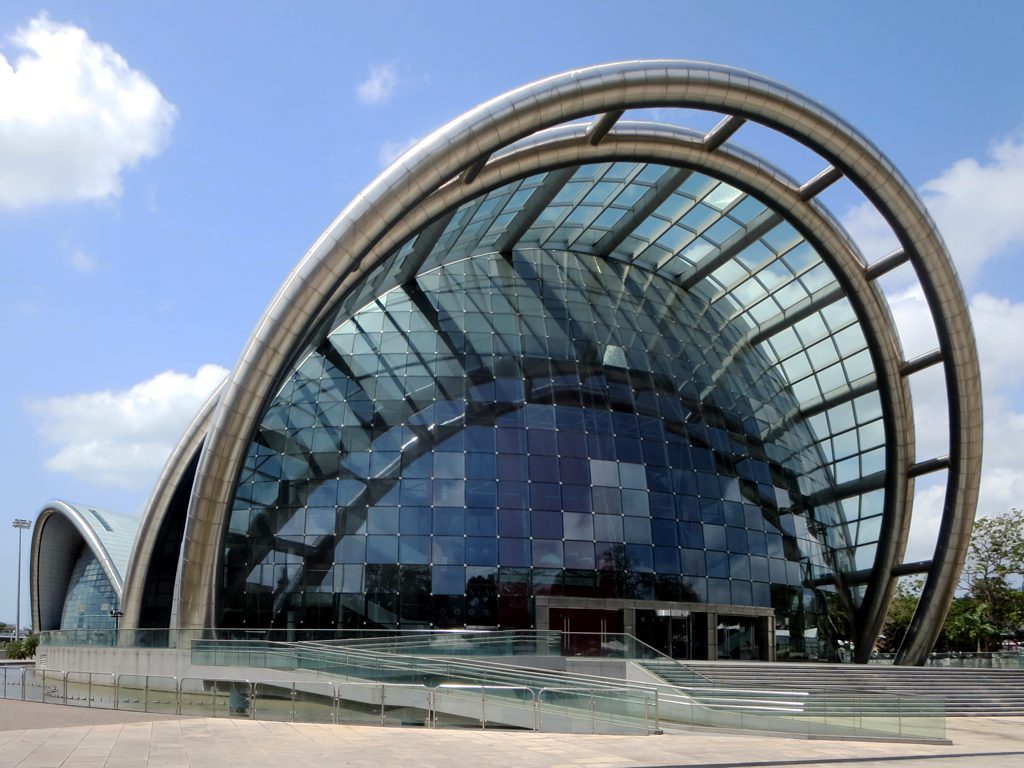
- Front view of the National Academy for the Performing Arts
- Interactive map of the National Academy for the Performing Arts area

General information
- Architectural style: Modern
- Location: Port of Spain, Trinidad and Tobago
- Coordinates: 10.656993°N 61.509808°W
- Construction started: 2006
- Completed: 2009
- Opened: November 9, 2009
- Owner: Government of Trinidad and Tobago

Design and construction
- Architect: China Jiangsu International

Website
- www.ttnapa.com

The National Academy for the Performing Arts (NAPA) is a cultural and performing arts complex located in Port of Spain, Trinidad and Tobago. Established in 2009, NAPA serves as a hub for the development and promotion of the performing arts in the country, providing facilities for education, rehearsals, and performances.

NAPA’s contribution to the cultural landscape of Trinidad and Tobago has been recognized with multiple awards. It has garnered praise not only for its architectural design but also for its impact on the local arts scene.

== History ==
The conception of NAPA was part of the Trinidad and Tobago government’s initiative to bolster the cultural sector and provide a dedicated space for the performing arts. Construction commenced in 2006, and the facility officially opened its doors in November 2009. The establishment of NAPA aimed to nurture local talent and provide a venue that meets international standards for performances and arts education. The building was designed to accommodate both large and small-scale performances and to serve as a hub for education and cultural exchange.

== Architecture ==
Designed by the Chinese firm China Jiangsu International, NAPA’s architecture is noted for its modern aesthetic, featuring a distinctive curved glass façade and a roof structure reminiscent of the national flower, the chaconia. The design integrates elements that reflect Trinidad and Tobago’s cultural identity while providing functional spaces for various artistic disciplines. The building’s design has earned recognition for blending contemporary architecture with cultural symbolism.

== Facilities ==
NAPA encompasses several key facilities:

- Main performance hall: A large auditorium equipped with advanced acoustics and lighting systems, accommodating a wide range of performances from orchestral concerts to theatrical productions.
- Little Theatre: A more intimate space designed for smaller performances, workshops, and lectures.
- Rehearsal rooms and studios: Dedicated spaces for music, dance, and drama rehearsals, fitted with appropriate flooring, mirrors, and sound equipment.
- Educational facilities: Classrooms and lecture halls supporting the academy’s educational programs in the performing arts.

== Educational programs ==
NAPA offers a range of educational programs aimed at developing the skills of aspiring artists in various disciplines. These programs are designed to provide students with a comprehensive understanding of the performing arts, as well as practical experience in their chosen fields. The curriculum includes:

- Music programs: Courses in classical and contemporary music, focusing on performance, theory, and composition.
- Dance programs: A variety of dance styles, from classical ballet to contemporary dance, with an emphasis on technique, performance, and choreography.
- Drama and theatre programs: Focused on acting, directing, stage management, and production, designed to nurture the next generation of theatre professionals.
- Arts management programs: Courses designed to develop skills in the management and promotion of arts events and organizations.

== See also ==
- Culture of Trinidad and Tobago
