= GRAITEC =

Software company, for the AECO industry

- Type: Private
- Industry: CAD / CAE Software/ Building Information Modeling Software
- Founded: 1986; 40 years ago in France
- Headquarters: Paris, France
- Key people: Francis Guillemard, Founder. Manuel Liedot, President & CEO
- Products: Building & Construction Software
- Number of employees: 600 (2022)
- Website: www.graitec.com

GRAITEC is an Autodesk reseller and developer of CAD / CAE software for the civil engineering and construction industries.

Headquartered in France, the company was founded in 1986 by Francis Guillemard. GRAITEC is a conglomerate of 13 wholly owned subsidiaries located across the globe, including in countries like France, Germany, Spain, Portugal, Czech Republic, Italy, Slovakia, Romania, the United Kingdom, Canada, and the United States with Applied Software.

== History ==
GRAITEC was founded in 1986 by Francis Guillemard.

In 2019 the company acquired Opentree Ltd and its document management system, Cabinet. It was followed by the acquisition of 2aCAD. Also in 2019, Apax Partners France, today known as Seven2, acquired a majority stake in GRAITEC.

Cadpoint UK was acquired in November 2020.

In 2021, GRAITEC acquired the Canadian-based company Strucsoft Solutions, and the Spanish-based structural analysis company Arktec.

In 2022, GRAITEC announces an agreement to acquire Applied Software. Originally founded in 1982, Atlanta-based Applied Software is an Autodesk partner.
