= Cindy Devika Sharma =

Trinidad and Tobago politician

Cindy Devika Sharma is an educator and politician from the Republic of Trinidad and Tobago.

== Early life and education ==
She lives in the town of Sangre Chiquito, Sangre Grande.

Sharma attended the University of the West Indies, where she earned a Bachelor of Arts degree in English and graduated with First Class Honours. She later pursued a Postgraduate Diploma in Education in 2003 and a Masters in Education at the University of the West Indies in 2005.

== Career ==
Before her appointment to the senate, Sharma was a secondary school teacher for more than nine years. She also worked as a part-time tutor for adult students.

She was appointed Senator as of December 17, 2007, as an Opposition Senator of the 9th Parliament. As Senator, she advocated for higher pensions for retired teachers. She served in the position from 15 January 2008 to 2 February 2009. During that time, she was on the Special Select Committee of the Senate - The Tobacco Control Bill, 2008. After the vacated the position in 2009, her seat was declared vacant.
