= Eifelpark =

Zoo in Germany

Eifelpark Wild und Freizeit
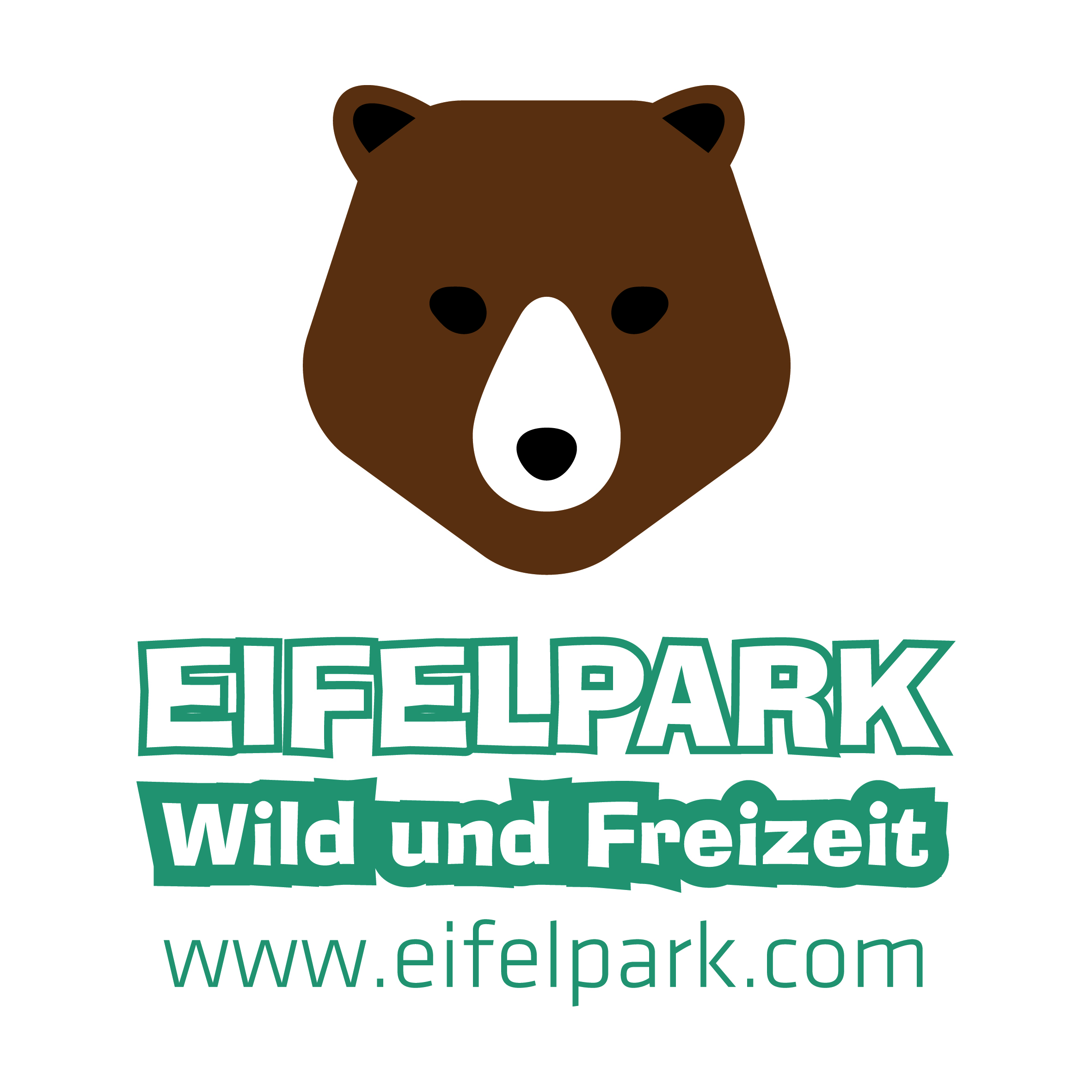

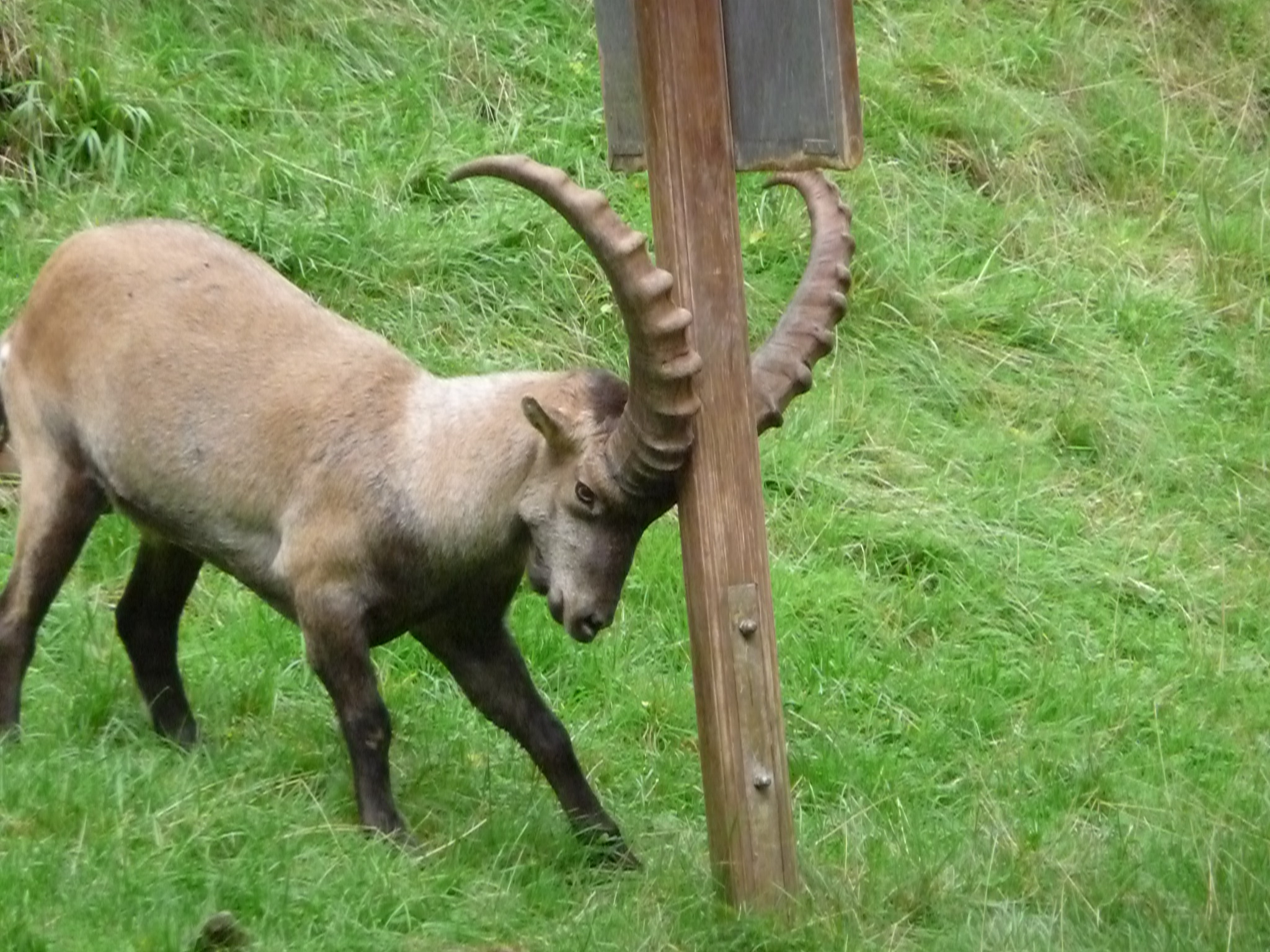
- Alpine ibex in the outdoor enclosure of the Eifelpark
- Interactive map of Eifelpark; Wild und Freizeit
- 49°57′46″N 06°37′03″E
- Date opened: 1964, re-opened 5 April 2014
- Land area: 750,000 m^{2} (8,100,000 sq ft)
- Annual visitors: 162,000 (2014)
- Owner: Nadine Löwenthal, Alexander Goetzke
- Website: Eifelpark Gondorf

The Eifelpark is a wildlife and leisure park in Gondorf near Bitburg in the Eifel mountains of Germany.

== History ==
In 1964 the Eifelpark was first opened under the name, Hochwildpark Eifel ("Eifel Mountain Wildlife Park"), as the first open-air wildlife enclosure in Germany. With the introduction of brown bears in 1969, Berlin took on the sponsorship of the bear gorge. In 1975 the then Minister-President of Rhineland-Palatinate, Helmut Kohl, opened the new mountain wildlife park in the Eifelpark. In the following years other attractions were added (such as the Slide Paradise, roller coaster, Eifel Express, Hüpfkissen, all weather rodelbahn, etc.). Since 2004 the Eifelpark, which had hitherto been run together with the Kurpfalz Park and the Panorama Park, has been managed from Haan (near Düsseldorf).

In early 2009, six Canadian timber wolves were introduced to the enclosure next to the renaturalised bear gorge.

In December 2012 the operator filed for bankruptcy.

Since 16 October 2013 the park has had a new owner and was reopened on 5 April 2014.

In the 2014 season, the family ride, Eifel Blitz, a Big Apple roller coaster, was opened along with various bumper car rides, a merry-go-round and other attractions. In addition everything was thoroughly renovated and the zoo was invested in. In 2015 more rides were added: the Gondorf Pirate Fight (a splash battle) and the Eifel Water Hunt (a jet ski with a crocodile theme by Heege).

== Attractions ==
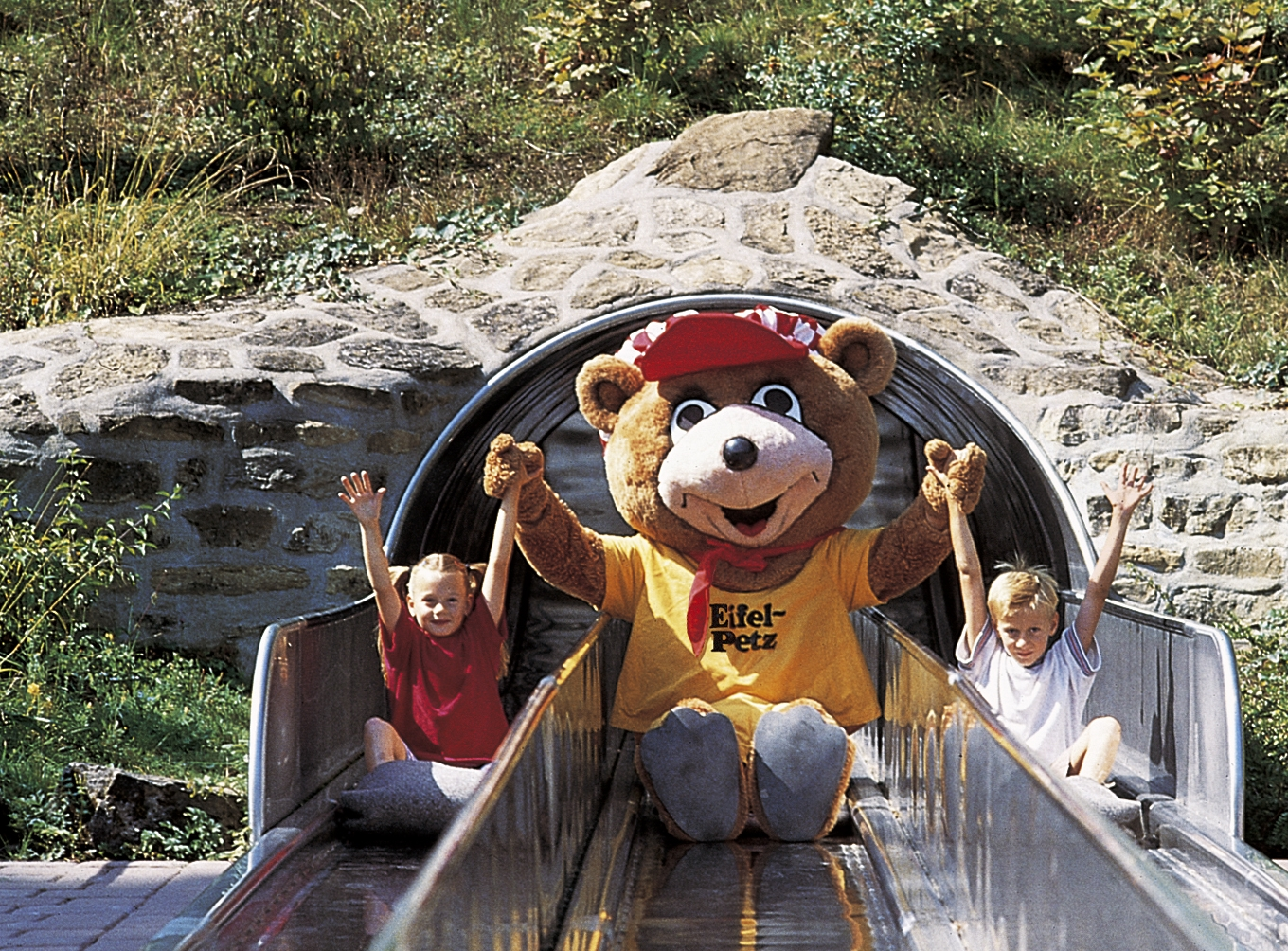
The Eifelpetz

- 80m Spining Drop Tower
- 14m family free fall tower
- Mountain Wildlife Park (Bergwildpark), (over 200 animals) with bear gorge and lynx station, Canadian timber wolves, wild boar, red deer and fallow deer
- Eifel Express (road train)
- Petting zoo with mountain goats
- Woodland educational path
- Eifel Coaster (all weather rodelbahn), 1,050 m long
- Family roller coaster, 126 m long, 30 km/h top speed
- Adventure playground
- 2 bumper car rides
- Water scooters
- Pony Express
- Horse merry-go-round
- Children's merry-go-round
- Bungee trampoline
- trampoline
- Freefall slide with 60% gradient, 40 m long
- Curved pipe slide and wave slide
- Bouncy pillows
- Fliegenpilz (Wellenflug-Kettenkarussell)
- Numerous play parks
- Pedal boats
- Electric cars

== Shows ==
Different shows are put on in the woodland theatre and the event grounds:

- Birds of prey free flight show with eagles, falcons and owls
- Puppet theatre
- Daily animal feeding
- dog show
