= Jean Effel =

French painter (1908–1982)

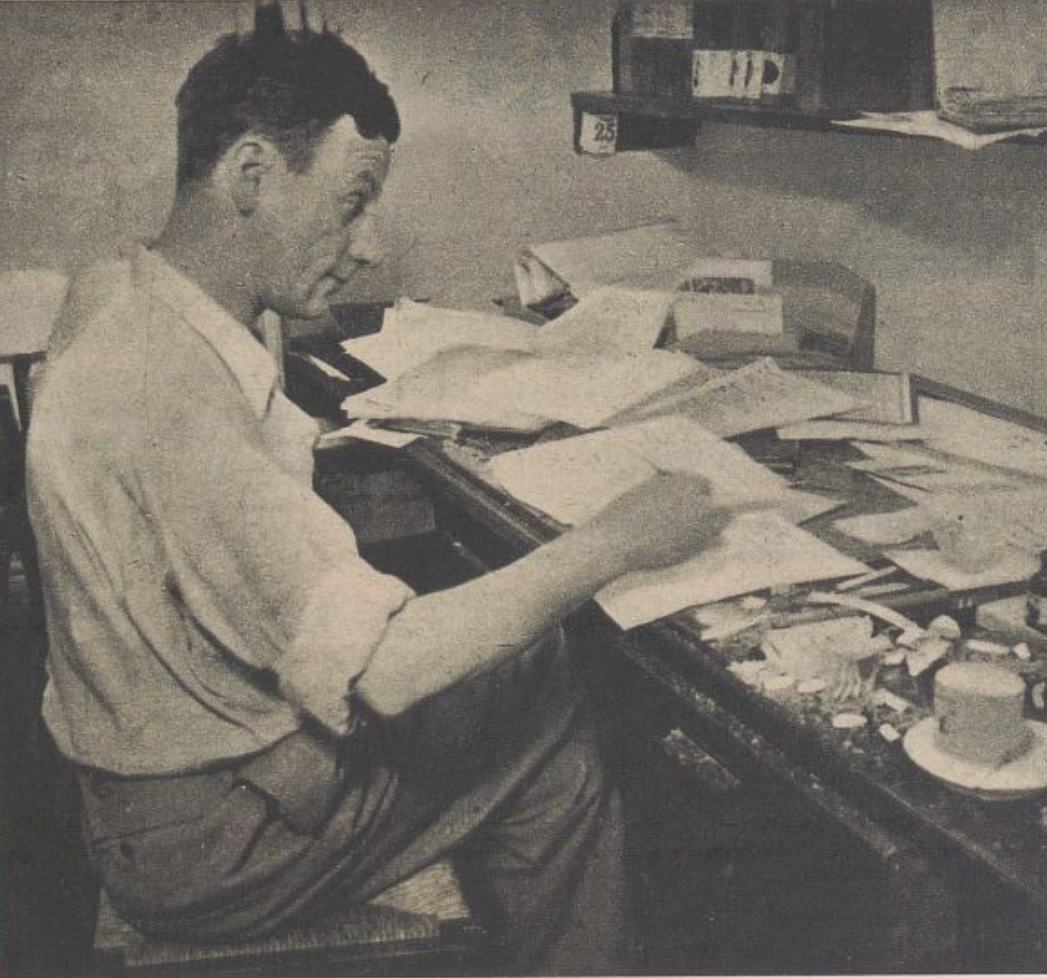
Jean Effel in 1946

Jean Effel, real name François Lejeune (12 February 1908 – 10 October 1982), was a French painter, caricaturist, illustrator and journalist. Mostly he considered himself to be a journalist and political commentator. His pseudonym is created by his initials F. L.

== Life ==
Effel was born in Paris and graduated in art, music and philosophy. Despite all efforts and wishes of his father to take over his merchant trade, Effel chose path of a professional artist. Often he drew for French newspaper l'Humanité and he is also author of illustrations of Jean de La Fontaine fables.

The cartoon cycle The Creation of the World is considered to be his greatest work (It was filmed in 1957 by director E. Hofman). The entire cycle includes five books: Le Ciel et la Terre (Sky and earth), Les Plantes et Animaux (Plants and animals), L'Homme (Man), La Femme (Woman) and Le Roman d'Adam et Eve (Story of Adam and Eve). Among his important works are also the collection of anti-fascist caricatures from 1935 and the book of cartoons When Animals Still Talked from 1953.

Effel's paintings are described by critics as easily readable, fresh, humorous and novel, carrying his recognizable curly signature often with a little daisy in the lower right corner that shows the author's kind view of the world.

Jean Effel had close relation to the USSR and Czechoslovakia, and was the longstanding chairman of the Company of French-Czechoslovak Friendship. He received the Lenin Peace Prize in 1967. He died in Paris in 1982.

Jean Effel was celebrated by the French Postal service in a 4FF stamp issued on 5 October 1983.

== Work ==
- 1935 – collection of antifascist caricatures
- 1944 – Turelune le Cornepipeux – fairy tale
- 1945 – La Création du Monde
- 1953 – When Animals Still Talked
