= Music of Trinidad and Tobago =

The music of Trinidad and Tobago is best known for its calypso music, soca music, chutney music, chutney-soca music, and steelpan. Calypso's internationally noted performances in the 1950s from artists such as Lord Melody, Lord Kitchener and Mighty Sparrow. The art form was most popularised at that time by Harry Belafonte. Along with folk songs and African and Indian-based classical forms, cross-cultural interactions have produced other indigenous forms of music including soca, rapso, parang, chutney, and other derivative and fusion styles. There are also local communities which practice and experiment with international classical and pop music, often fusing them with local steelpan instruments.

MusicTT was established in 2014 to facilitate the business development and export activity of the music industry in Trinidad and Tobago.

== History ==
The Cedula of Population of 1783 laid the foundation and growth of the population of Trinidad. The island's Spanish possessors contributed little towards advancements, with El Dorado the focus; Trinidad's geographical location made it the center of that focus. Following the Cedula, French planters (accompanied by their slaves, free coloreds and mulattos) from the French Antilles of Martinique, Grenada, Guadeloupe and Dominica migrated to the Trinidad. This exodus was encouraged due to the English takeovers of certain islands and the French Revolution. The Spanish also gave many incentives to lure settlers to the island, including exemption from taxes for 10 years and land grants in accordance to the terms set out in the Cedula. These new immigrants established local communities of Blanchisseuse, Champs Fleurs, Paramin, Cascade, Carenage and Laventille. Trinidad's population jumped from less than 1,400 in 1777, to over 15,000 by the end of 1789. In 1797, Trinidad became a British crown colony, with a French-speaking population.

Carnival had arrived with the French. Indentured laborers and slaves, who could not take part in Carnival, formed their own, parallel celebration, canboulay, which became the precursor for the Trinidad & Tobago Carnival, and has played an important role in the development of Trinidad's culture. Kaiso music is said to have been created by the first “Maît Kaiso” called Gros Jean.

Official and elite unease over carnival revelry (which was considered violent and unruly) grew during the next few decades, and in 1883 drumming was banned in an attempt to clean up Carnival. This injunction came after a serious disturbance during the 1881 Carnival, known as the Canboulay Riots. Canboulays were processions during carnival that commemorated the harvesting of burnt cane fields during slavery, a process so labor-intensive that it had often involved forced marches of slaves from neighboring plantations to more efficiently harvest the cane (once the field is burned, the cane requires immediate harvesting, or it spoils). These canboulay processions were popular, and often incorporated kalenda. The government's attempt to ban the processions in 1881 resulted in open riots between Afro-Creole revelers and police, a turn of events that, not surprisingly, caused deep resentment within Trinidadian society toward the government's use of power. The open resistance of Afro-Creole revelers, of course, redoubled concerns among government officials over this potential threat to public order and led to an alternative strategy—the banning of drumming—in 1883. To make sure that the point got across, stick-fighting itself was banned in 1884. An ingenious substitute for the drums and sticks, called tamboo bamboo, was introduced in the 1890s.

Tamboo-bamboo bands consist of three different instruments (each cut from bamboo): boom, foulé, and cutter. The boom serves as the bass instrument, is usually about five feet long, and is played by stamping it on the ground. The foulé, a higher-pitched instrument, consists of two pieces of bamboo, each about a foot long, and is played by striking these pieces end to end. The cutter, the highest-pitched instrument in the ensemble, is made from a thinner piece of bamboo (of varying length) and is struck with a stick. These three types of instruments combined to beat out rhythms that accompanied the chantwells and were a staple of carnival celebrations for many years. They were gradually rendered obsolete by the steel band.

The 1930s saw contests between tents become a standard part of Carnival, and in 1939, Growling Tiger was crowned the first calypso monarch of Trinidad (for his song, "The Labor Situation in Trinidad"). Carnival festivities split into two kinds of venues during the late 19th and early 20th centuries, occupying both the street and more performance-oriented calypso tents. Both of these spaces, however, were the preserve of the lower class and of Afro-Creoles. Calypsonians were considered potentially dangerous by elites and government officials because they commanded large followings and could sway public opinion with their songs. The streets were also carefully monitored, setting up an atmosphere within which calypso and Carnival were embraced by the lower class and kept at a distance by elites. The Afro-Creole middle class, moreover, working toward upward social mobility and thus concerned with aligning itself with the elite, also attempted to distance itself from Carnival and calypso.

Beginning in 1845, major influxes of indentured immigrants from India and other parts of the world dramatically changed the ethnic composition of the islands. These indentured servants brought their own folk music, primarily from Uttar Pradesh and Bihar, to the creole mix, resulting in chutney music. In addition to Indians, Syrians, Portuguese, Chinese and Africans came to the islands in waves between 1845 and 1917, and even after.

== Folk traditions ==
Recorded in the hills of Trinidad, here is a fascinating juxtaposition of three music and music / dance practices of non-urban dwellers derived from African roots. Bamboo-Tamboo evolved out of the ban which European colonizers imposed on drumming: dry, hollow bamboo poles were cut to varying lengths to produce different pitches when thumped theground. These bamboo instruments are used to accompany or speak about calinda (stick fighting). Belair (bélé) is a dance of older women accompanied by drums and shakers

=== Bélé ===
In the late 18th century when the French plantation owners and their Creole slaves came to Trinidad and Tobago, they brought with them a life style of "joie de vivre" to their plantations. At that time, the French held many balls at the Great Houses where they enjoyed doing many of the courtly dances of Europe.

The house slaves, in their moments of leisure, took the dance to the field slaves and mimicked the dance of their masters. The slaves who worked in or around these houses quickly copied the style and dress. They showed off by doing ceremonious bows, making grand entrances, sweeping movements, graceful and gentle gliding steps which imitated the perceived elegance of the French. The rhythmic quality of the bélé drums added spicy and yet subtle sensuality to the movements. There are more than 14 types of bélé dances including the Grand bélé and Congo bélé, with each performed to its own rhythms and chants.

=== Tamboo-bamboo ===
Stick fighting and African percussion music were banned in 1881 from Trinidad Carnival, in response to the Canboulay Riots. They were replaced by bamboo sticks called "tamboo-bamboo" (originally tambour bamboo) beaten together, which were themselves banned in turn. Tamboo-bamboo evolved out of the ban which European colonizers imposed on drumming: dry, hollow bamboo poles were cut to varying lengths to produce different pitches when thumped against the ground. In 1937 they reappeared, transformed as an orchestra of frying pans, dustbin lids and oil drums. These steelpans or pans are now a major part of the Trinidadian music.

The first instruments developed in the evolution of steelpan were tamboo-bamboos, tunable sticks made of bamboo wood. Tamboo-bamboo bands also included percussion of a (gin) bottle and spoon. By the mid-1930s, bits of metal percussion were being used in the tamboo bamboo bands.

=== Kaiso ===
Kaiso is a type of music popular in Trinidad and Tobago, Grenada, Barbados, St. Lucia and Dominica. It originated from West African call and response songs, and later evolved into calypso music.

Kaiso music has its origins in West African call and response songs (particularly in present-day Nigeria) which were brought over by the slaves who (in the early history of the art form) used them to sing about their masters and ways to gain their freedom, such as Gros Jean, who is sometimes regarded as the first “Calypsonian”. The people would also gather in "kaiso" tents where a griot or lead singer would lead them in song. Many early kaisos were sung in French Creole by a "chantwell". Kaiso songs are generally narrative in form and often have a cleverly concealed political subtext.

After Emancipation of slavery, the chantwell would sing call-and-response chants called lavways, lionizing and cheering on champion stickfighters. This form of music gradually evolved into the modern day calypso.

== Calypso ==
Calypso music grew together with Carnival. The music drew upon the West African Kaiso and French/European influences, and arose as a means of communication among the enslaved Africans. Kaiso is still used today as a synonym for calypso in Trinidad and some other islands, often by traditionalists, and is also used as a cry of encouragement for a performer, similar to bravo or olé. Highly rhythmic and harmonic vocals characterized the music, which was most often sung in a French Creole and led by a griot. As calypso developed, the role of the griot (originally a similar traveling musician in West Africa) became known as a chantuelle, and eventually, calypsonian. Calypso was popularized after the abolition of slavery and the ensuing growth of the Carnival festivals in the 1830s.

Modern calypso, however, began in the 19th century, a fusion of disparate elements ranging from the masquerade song lavway, French Creole belair and the stick fighting chantwell. Calypso's early rise was closely connected with the adoption of Carnival by Trinidadian slaves, including canboulay drumming and the music masquerade processions. The French brought Masquerade Balls to Trinidad which were mimicked by ex-slaves after Abolition of Slavery, and calypso competitions at Carnival grew in popularity, especially after the abolition of slavery in 1834.

Calypso drew upon African and French influences, and became the voice of the people. It allowed the masses to challenge the actions of the unelected Governor and Legislative Council, and the elected town councils of Port of Spain and San Fernando. As English replaced patois (French Creole) as the dominant language, calypso migrated into English, and in so doing it attracted more attention from the radio stations and government. Calypso continued to play an important role in political expression, and also served to document the history of Trinidad and Tobago.

=== Early performers ===
Early chantwells such as Hannibal, Norman Le Blanc, Mighty Panther and Boadicea made names for themselves by criticizing the colonial government. In 1912, calypso was recorded for the first time and the following decade saw the arrival of calypso tent. During Carnival, calypsonians competed for awards like the Carnival Road March, National Calypso Monarch, Calypso Queen, Junior Monarch and Extempo Monarch in contests called picong, when two performers trade bawdy and irreverent jibes at each other, and referencing the day's events. Soon, stars such as Lord Invader and Roaring Lion grew in stature (the 1930s Golden Age of Calypso) and became more closely aligned with the independence movement. Some songs were banned or censored by the British colonial government, and calypso became a method of underground communication and spreading anti-British information.

These early popular performers led the way for calypso's mainstreaming with artists including Lord Kitchener, Harry Belafonte and Mighty Sparrow. Belafonte, a Jamaican-American singing in American English, was by far the most popular internationally during this wave (with his Calypso album, Belafonte was the first artist to sell a million copies), but his music was also criticized for watering down the sound of calypso.

1947 saw Lord Kitchener and Killer forming the renegade calypso tent Young Brigade. The term Young Brigade soon came to refer to a specific group of calypsonians that used fictional narratives and humor with new, more dance-able rhythms. Kitchener was by far the most popular of the Young Brigade calypsonians, and he helped popularize calypso in the United Kingdom and elsewhere. Mighty Sparrow's first hit was Jean and Dinah, celebrating the departure of American military forces from Trinidad; the song launched a new generation of politically active calypso music, which soon became associated with the People's National Movement. Roaring Lion was also a major part of this vanguard in calypso music, and he became known for a traditionalist style that he maintained throughout his career.

During the 1970s, calypso's popularity waned throughout the world, including the Caribbean. Derivatives include an uptempo version of Calypso music called soca, and a hip-hop-influenced style called rapso both became popular in Trinidad and other islands. Soca was by the more influential in terms of international sales, since rapso's crossover appeal to mainstream tastes has been extremely limited. Old-time calypsonians and purists, however, preferred rapso's continuation of the lyrical ambidexterity that helped make calypso the world-famous, innovative art form it has become; many criticized soca's perceived watering-down of calypso, including veteran calypsonians such as Chalkdust, who asked: "Are we to put water in the brandy, singing just two or three words [that mainstream audiences] can understand and dance to?" Indo-Trinidadians began popularising chutney music during the same time period. In the mid-1970s, artists like Sundar Popo made the music mainstream.

== The father of soca music ==
The "father" of soca was a Trinidadian man named Garfield Blackman who rose to fame as "Lord Shorty" with his 1964 hit "Cloak and Dagger" and took on the name "Ras Shorty I" in the early 1980s. He started out writing songs and performing in the calypso genre. A prolific musician, composer, and innovator, Shorty experimented with fusing calypso and elements of Indo-Caribbean music for nearly a decade from 1965 before unleashing "the soul of calypso", soca music by the early 1970s.

Shorty was the first to define his music as "soca" during 1975 when his hit song “Endless Vibrations” was causing major musical waves on radio stations and at parties and clubs not just throughout his native T&T but also in far-off metropolitan cities like New York, Toronto, and London. Soca was initially spelled Sokah which stands for the “Soul of Calypso” with the “Kah” part being taken from the first letter in the Sanskrit alphabet and representing the Power of movement as well as the East Indian rhythmic influence that helped to inspire the new soca beat. Shorty stated in several interviews that the idea for the new soca beat started with the rhythmic fusion of Calypso rhythms with East Indian rhythms that he used in his hit "Indrani" recorded in 1972. The soca beat was solidified as the popular new beat that most of the T&T Calypso musicians would start adopting by the time Shorty had recorded his big crossover hit “Endless Vibrations” in 1974.

Shorty also recorded a mid-year album in 1975 called “Love In The Caribbean” that contains several crossover soca tracks before setting off on an album distribution and promotion tour. During his 1975 “Love In The Caribbean” album promotion and distribution tour, Shorty pass thru the isle of Dominica on his way back to Trinidad and saw Dominica's top band Exile One perform at the Fort Young Hotel. Shorty was inspired to compose and record a Soca and Cadence-lypso fusion track called “E Pete” or “Ou Petit” which can be viewed as the first of its kind in that particular Soca style. Shorty sought and got help with the Creole lyrics he used in the chorus of his “E Pete” song by consulting with Dominica's 1969 Calypso King, Lord Tokyo, and two creole lyricists, Chris Seraphine and Pat Aaron while he was in Dominica. The song “E Pete” thus contains genuine Creole lyrics in the chorus like "Ou dee moin ou petit Shorty" (meaning "you told me you are small Shorty"), and is a combination of Soca, Calypso, Cadence-lypso and Creole.

Shorty's 1974 Endless Vibrations and Soul of Calypso brought Soca to be regional and international attention and fame and helped to solidify the rapidly growing Soca Movement led by Shorty.

Soca developed in the early 1970s and grew in popularity in the late 1970s. Soca's development as a musical genre included its early fusion of calypso with Indian musical instruments, particularly the dholak, tabla, and dhantal, as demonstrated in Lord Shorty's classic compositions "Ïndrani", "Kalo Gee Bull Bull" and "Shanti Om".

Soca has grown since its inception to incorporate elements of funk, soul, disco, zouk and other dance music genres, and continues to blend in contemporary music styles and trends. Soca has also been experimented with in Bollywood films, Bhangra, in new Punjabi pop, and in disco music in the United States.

== Rapso ==
Rapso arose as Black Power and Pan-Africanist thought spread in Trinidad. Lancelot Layne is said to have invented the genre with his 1971 hit "Blow Away", while Cheryl Byron brought rapso to calypso tents in 1976. The term rapso first appeared in 1980 on Busting Out, an album by Brother Resistance and his Network Riddum Band. Rapso has become one of the most prevalent expressions of music on Trinidad itself, but is largely absorbed into calypso during Carnival celebrations and contests. The 1990s saw a more politically and spiritually-conscious form of rapso, which has been infused with soul and reggae music, as well as native J'ouvert, an early introduction to Carnival which consists of percussionists using makeshift materials to hammer out a beat. The trio band 3 Canal, and the artist Ataklan, are among the most popular modern proponents.

== Extempo ==
Extempo, or extempo calypso, or calypso war, is a lyrically improvised (freestyled) form of calypso. An annual competition is held at the Trinidad and Tobago Carnival for the title of Extempo Monarch. The art form was first recorded in the 1940s in Trinidad.

== Brass bands ==
Starting in 1986, David Rudder popularized the brass band in Carnival competitions. Brass bands had long been a part of Trinidad's cultural heritage, but Rudder helped inspire the founding of the Caribbean Brass Festival in 1991.

== Steel-pan and steel bands ==
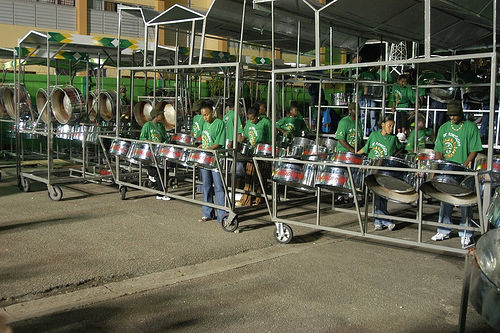
The BP Renegades, a steelpan orchestra

One of the most significant contributions of Trinidad and Tobago to the world of music was the invention of the steelpan. This instrument is the only acoustic instrument that was invented in the 20th century. The pan evolved from music which the island slaves created for the carnival festivities. The first steel-pans were made from oil drums. The players would beat on the end of the oil drum with bamboo to produce music and found that the areas of the drum that were hit the most frequently developed a higher pitch. From this discovery the players learned that they could change the pitch of the drum to create different notes.

The steel-pan is created by hammering a 55-gallon drum to produce the full chromatic range of scale notes. After the drum is hammered into the shape of a concave bowl, individual notes are grooved out into the bowl of the drum. The traditional steel-pan was hammered out by hand, but with the instrument gaining popularity and worldwide demand, manufacturers have experimented with more efficient methods including Spinforming, Flowforming, Aquaforming and Marforming. A typical pan contains 2 1/2 octaves, with each note being a hammered out groove in the pan that produces a distinct note.

Steel-pan originates from low-income communities and was at first associated with violence and lawlessness. The upper class looked on steel-pan players with disdain until Dr. Eric Williams, leader of People's National Movement and the man known as father of the nation, increased the acceptance of steel-pan in the mainstream music scene by encouraging corporations to sponsor steel bands, giving the bands more respectability in society. Today, steel-pan is the national instrument of Trinidad and Tobago and is used worldwide. In 2013 Ancel Bhagwandeen was awarded by the Prime minister's Awards for Scientific Ingenuity for developing and producing the World's first tenor pan stick that is sound sensitive and displays light colours in sync with playing the steel pan. It is the first modernization of the pan stick in decades.

== Parang ==
In Trinidad and Tobago the Latin American-derived seasonal Christmas music called Parang is about more than just Christmas carols. Parang is about general merrymaking and festivities around Christmas time and the food, dancing and music is all a part of the parang. The singers of parang visit the homes of family and friends and sing Christmas-themed songs in Spanish accompanied by instruments, usually the guitar, Venezuelan cuatro, maracas (known as chac-chacs on the islands), mandolin, bandolin, violin, bandola and sometimes the cello. Parang is mostly performed during the Christmas season but is also used at other festivals throughout the year, including the Santa Rosa Festival, the velorio del cruz, and the Sebucan festival. Parang includes both religious and non-religious songs and melodies set against the parang instrumentation. Parang festivities typically involve dancing and there are two primary dance styles, the slower Castilian waltz and a quicker Gavilan style.

== Chutney music ==
Indians arrived in Trinidad and Tobago on May 30, 1845 as indentured laborers on the sugarcane, cocoa, and rice plantations, to fill the labor void left by the abolition of slavery. The island's growing Indian population developed the musical style of chutney. This musical form based on Indian rhythms was named chutney because it is hot music, its use of double entendres and fast and repetitive rhythms make its listeners want to dance. Chutney uses a mixture of East Indian classical music, East Indian folk music, bhajans and ghazals (bhajans and ghazals are religious songs), Western and African instruments, and usually the Indian musical instruments: harmonium, dholak, tabla, dhantal, manjira, tassa, and sometimes the bulbul tarang or mandolin to accompany its fast-paced soca or calypso beats. Sundar Popo was one of the first who pioneered in this music. Chutney music is a mixture of Indian tunes influenced by calypso and soca rhythms, and it has been blended with many of the other varieties of music on the island. Artists like Apache Waria and Terry Gajraj pioneered ragga chutney. Chutney has also developed into chutney-bhangra, chutney-hip-hop, soca-bhangra and bhangra-wine.

As chutney music's popularity grows, people are becoming more aware of the mixture of cultures present in Trinidad and Tobago. Many of the chutney artists that are known within West Indian culture are from Trinidad. Sundar Popo was a pioneer of chutney music, famous for first blending chutney with calypso and soca and increasing the popularity of the genre. The instruments used in chutney were those that were approved for women to play, making chutney becoming viewed as a woman's music genre. Since then, chutney has grown from a woman's genre into a leading player of the pop music scene with both men and women participating in nationwide competitions. Chutney music is a reflection on the culture of Trinidad and Tobago, its blending of Indian, Western and African elements is a representation of the backgrounds that are mixed together to form the culture of Trinidad and Tobago.

== Pop, rock and alternative music ==
Trinidad and Tobago has an underground pop, rock and heavy metal scene with many small shows being held throughout the year. The largest of such shows are the annual Pop Music Awards held at the Tsunami nightclub in Chaguaramas and the Samaan Tree Rock Festival in Aranguez.

== Western classical ==
There is a long tradition of western classical music, both instrumental and choral, dating back to the colonial era under the British. The Trinidad & Tobago Music Festival is a primary showcase for these art forms. Choral groups, steelband and traditional western orchestras, smaller ensembles, music schools and programmes, and others stage shows at venues around the country, particularly at the Queen's Hall in Port of Spain; the University of the West Indies (St. Augustine Campus); Central Bank Auditorium; Simon Bolivar auditorium; churches and cathedrals; and at the new National Academy for the Performing Arts (NAPA), which was opened in 2009 but closed down in 2014 for renovations. Popular proponents of the Western Classical form include the St Augustine Chamber Orchestra/Trinidad and Tobago Youth Philharmonic (the largest symphony orchestra and largest youth orchestra in the English-speaking Caribbean), Marionettes Chorale (the first choir to blend choral voices with the steelpan), Eastern Performing Arts Fraternity and Eastern Youth Chorale, Lydian Singers, UWI Festival Arts Chorale; the National Philharmonic and the National Steel Symphony Orchestra, and the Classical Music Development Foundation, among others.

== Hindustani classical ==
Historically, the indentured laborers who came from India brought with them the form of authentic Indian Classical Music. A form of local Indo-Trinidad classical music was later created. However, organisations were able to keep the pure classical form alive. Bharatiya Vidya Sansthaan, under the guidance of Prof. Hari Shankara Adesh, was the first institution to provide courses in the authentic classical artform of India.

Prof. Rajesh Kelkar (from historic Maharaja Sayajirao University of Baroda), went to remote villages of Trinidad and taught classical and devotional music with missionary zeal.

== MusicTT ==
The government has identified the music industry as one of three pioneering sectors that are pivotal to long-term economic sustainability because of dropping prices of oil and gas, Trinidad and Tobago's main export. For this reason, MusicTT was established in 2014 as a subsidiary of CreativeTT. MusicTT’s mandate is "to stimulate and facilitate the business development and export activity of the music industry in Trinidad and Tobago to generate national wealth."

== See also ==
- List of calypso songs about cricket
- List of calypso songs about war
