= Lord Pretender =

Tobagonian calypso singer (1917–2002)

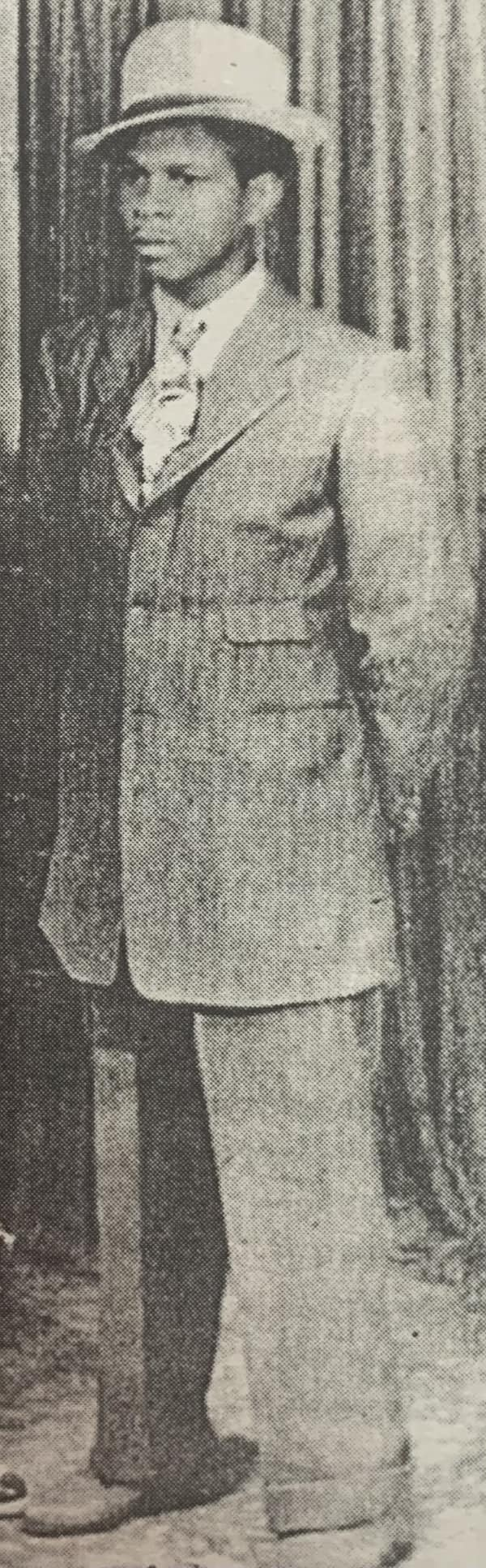
- Pretender in 1945

Background information
- Born: Aldric Farrell; 8 September 1917; Tobago
- Died: 22 January 2002 (aged 84); Port of Spain, Trinidad and Tobago
- Genres: calypso, Extempo
- Occupations: Musician
- Instruments: Vocals
- Years active: 1929–1995

Lord Pretender (8 September 1917 – 22 January 2002) was the stage name of Aldric Farrell, M.O.M., H.B.M. a calypsonian vocalist born on the island of Tobago widely acknowledged to be a "master" of extempo, a lyrically improvised form of calypso music. Starting with an impromptu performance at the age of 12, his career spanned nearly seven decades until cancer of the larynx forced him to retire in the mid-1990s.

In 1957, Lord Pretender won the prestigious "Calypso King" competition. Honoured by the Trinidad and Tobago government for his services to calypso in 1972, he went on to receive the island's Hummingbird Medal in 1994.

== Career ==
Farrell's mother went to the United States to look for work and left him, at a young age, with his maternal grandmother in Trinidad.

He made his first public performance at the age of 12 in 1929, when he delivered a self-composed calypso about the ghost of a young girl.

Early appearances quickly gained Farrell popularity and earned him the moniker "the Boy Wonder", though he soon reverted to "Pretender", a previous nickname from his school days.

His grandmother did not approve of this career choice due to the "scandalous reputation" of the calypso musicians and more than once, she entered a calypso tent and dragged Pretender out mid-performance. Farrell later recalled: "I'd get two clouts in the face. My grandmother would say: 'You disgracing the family.'"

Pretender, who was affectionately known as "Preddie", regularly performed calypso in the tents throughout Trinidad and Tobago, and his career progressed steadily during the mid-1930s as he performed side by side with stars of the calypso scene, such as Attila the Hun, Roaring Lion, and Lord Beginner. Wealth did not automatically follow success in the business; when Pretender accompanied fellow calypsonian Executor on a tour lasting over a month, he received just 60 cents and two bags of oranges as payment.

Lord Pretender won his first music competition with his calypso "Ode to the Negro Race", which became a popular wartime number. The song's chorus states: "God made us all and in him we trust; So nobody in the world is better than us." In 1937, he made his first recording, for RCA Victor's Bluebird Records sub-label, and in 1939 he placed third in the original "Calypso King" competition, an event he later won in 1957 with his version of "Que Será, Será". The honour of being crowned calypso monarch was regarded by the islanders as the ultimate achievement for any calypsonian.

Pretender's 1961 song "Never Ever Worry" is considered to be "one of the classic calypsos of all time". Fellow calypsonian David Rudder once remarked that: "Pretender talked about how there's always someone who has more worries than you. Pretender grew up in an era when calypsonians were not accepted as they are today, and it's this philosophy that got him through those hard times and made him last so long." In 1996, "Never Ever Worry" featured in the soundtrack for the U.S. road movie Cadillac Ranch:

Don't mind how you suffering bad
What I say is true
Always consider:
Somebody suffering more than you.
Excerpt from "Never Ever Worry"—Lord Pretender (1961)

In 1972, Pretender received his first national award, the Trinidad & Tobago Public Service Medal of Merit Silver (for Calypso), from Governor-General Sir Solomon Hochoy. The following year, he competed against Roaring Lion, Viper, the Great Unknown and Owl, in a calypso contest, after which Lord Pretender was honoured as king of extempo.

Lord Pretender enjoyed a lengthy career in the music business and until the mid-1990s gave regular performances. In 1994, he received the prestigious Hummingbird medal, but despite frequent appearances on stage he did not make much money during his 72-year music career. In the mid-1990s, cancer of the larynx put an end to his singing career, and in later life the government provided him with rent-free accommodation at Port of Spain. A single man with no children, Lord Pretender was a big fan of horse racing, and could frequently be observed at Trinidad's Santa Rosa Park racecourse with his horse-owning friend Lord Kitchener.

Pretender died at the age of 84, having been hospitalised for several months due to the throat cancer he had suffered for years. The general secretary of the Trinbago Unified Calypsonians' Organisation (TUCO) stated that: "Pretender was one of the legends of calypso," and that, "Trinidad has lost a cultural icon....His exploits and achievements will for a long time form part of our cultural legacy as well as our national history."

=== Style ===
Lord Pretender perennially appeared on stage smartly dressed in a sharp suit with skinny tie, his act characterised by the casting of suspicious glances and an idiosyncratic utilisation of his fedora as a prop.

Pretender stressed social commentary in calypso, and throughout his career stayed with oratorical ballads. According to Rapso artist Brother Resistance, Pretender had "zero tolerance for calypsonians who ignored lyrical content in their song," and was known for stressing a "witty, moralising element" in his compositions. Upon Lord Pretender's death, David Rudder commented that Pretender was "a stickler for what he considered to be authentic kaiso." Rudder, who in the past had been criticised by Pretender, also remarked: "The last time I saw him...he asked me when I was going to sing calypso."

The zenith of a woman's ambition in life
Should be to be a loving mother and a pleasing wife
For thus they are by nature intended
Not as overlords or slaves but to man subjected
To join with him in love and connubial unity
In generating humanity.
"Mother Love"—Lord Pretender (1937)

In "Yo No Quiero Trabajo", Lord Pretender tells of the commonly held perception by men of the time that dating a rich white woman led to an increase in respect:

Even my friends they envy me
But I am idolized by the family
And sooner or later I'll buy a car
To drive around the circular.
"Yo No Quiero Trabajo"—Lord Pretender

=== Extempo ===
Pretender was widely considered "master" of extempo, a lyrically improvised form of calypso music, which at the time was held to be the supreme form of calypso. Extempo involves the improvisation of lyrics based upon topics suggested by the audience; the performer spontaneously devises songs filled with intricate lyrics and rhymes. Pretender has been described as extempo's "greatest exponent, and virtually sole guardian."

"He never entered the annual extempo competition, instituted in the hope of reviving the discipline in Trinidad, because by general consent, he would have spoiled the party for everyone else. No one could match his ability to conjure up humorous, and perfectly scanned, verses from nowhere."

Talking of his technique, Pretender once explained that "the trick is always to have your first and last verse." Rudder described Pretender as "a sly, old fox when it came to singing extempo", and fellow calypsonian Mighty Sparrow agreed, stating that: "When you think you have him, he rest a hot piece of extempo on you. He could think fast."

== Selected discography ==
- "Mother Love" (1937)
- "The Virtue of a Woman" (1939)
- "God Made Us All" (1943)
- "What the West Indies Really Needs" (1946)
- "Federation" (1952)
- "The Gomes Report" (1953)
- "Why BG Will Not See Royalty" (1955)
- "Never Ever Worry" (1961)

=== Compilations ===
- Cause The Coup
- Never Ever Worry
- True True Kaisonian
- What Cause The Coup
- Moral Decay
- Move Yuh Foot
- God Made Us All
- Illegitimate Children
- Everybody Love We Carnival
- Human Race
- Stop Meddling With The Moon
- They Didn't Make Them Like That Anymore
- Leave We Mas In The Savannah
- Never Ever Worry

== See also ==
- Calypsonian
- Kaiso
- Calypso War
