= Winsford Devine =

Trinidad and Tobago songwriter (1943–2021)

- Born: 5 August 1943; Quarry Village, Morne Diablo, Trinidad
- Died: 22 June 2021 (aged 77); Port of Spain, Trinidad
- Other name: Joker
- Occupations: Songwriter, musician
- Known for: Calypsos composed for The Mighty Sparrow
- Awards: Hummingbird Medal (Silver)

Winsford Devine (15 August 1943 – 22 June 2021), known by the sobriquet Joker, was a Trinidad and Tobago songwriter who composed more than 500 calypsos. He worked with calypsonian The Mighty Sparrow for 17 years, writing many of Sparrow's hits, including "Slave", "Philip, My Dear", and "Marajhin". Devine was also the composer of "Progress", which has been ranked among the best calypsos ever.

== Early life ==
Winsford Devine was born in Quarry Village, Morne Diablo, in south Trinidad, the first of five children born to Eurice Des Vignes and Clifford Cooper. An error on his birth certificate recorded his mother's name as Devine, which resulted in this spelling of his name. He was taught to play the cuatro by his father, a parandero, and joined a steelband led by his cousin at the age of nine.

Devine attended Morne Diablo Roman Catholic School and San Fernando Technical Institute, but dropped out after his first year because he was unable to afford the fees. In 1968, he moved to Nelson Street, in Port of Spain, where his skill with steelpan led Mervyn "Bolong" Ross to invite him to join Blue Diamond Steelband. After hearing him writing songs, Ross introduced Devine to Syl Taylor, the manager of the Original Young Brigade Calypso Tent, who purchased Devine's entire collection of songs for TT $365. Lord Blakie (Carlton Joseph) was the first to sing one of Devine's compositions, "Road March Recipe", which was later recorded with Joseph credited as the composer.

== Musical work ==
Devine was a self-taught musician who composed more than 500 songs (more than 600, according to reporting in the Stabroek News). His compositions include "Progress" (recorded by King Austin), which historian Kim Johnson described as "what many consider is one of the greatest calypsoes" and which the Trinbago Unified Calypsonians' Organisation (TUCO) declared "the song of the last millennium".

=== Collaboration with Sparrow ===
For a period of 17 years starting in 1971, Devine wrote for calypsonian The Mighty Sparrow (Slinger Francisco). Sparrow won the Calypso Monarch competition four times in this period. Calypsos written by Devine for Sparrow include "Capitalism Gone Mad", "Phillip My Dear", "Saltfish", "Marajhin" and "Survival".

Devine and Sparrow disputed authorship of several of Sparrows hits, including "Drunk and Disorderly" (which Devine said he wrote as "Drunkard Calypso") and "Doh Back Back" (which Devine said he wrote as "Bajan"). Historian Claudius Fergus reports that "many of Sparrow's best calypsos, including 'Slave,' were composed by...Devine" and others were co-written by Devine and Sparrow.

== Awards and honours ==
In 1998, Devine was awarded the Hummingbird Medal (Silver), a state decoration of Trinidad and Tobago, for his service to music and the arts.

He was named Honorary Distinguished Fellow in the Arts by the University of Trinidad and Tobago in 2016 and received an Honorary Doctor of Letters from the University of the West Indies, St. Augustine in 2017.
