= Extempo =

Lyrically improvised form of calypso, practiced in Grenada and Trinidad and Tobago

Extempo (also extempo calypso) is a lyrically improvised form of calypso and is most notably practiced in Grenada and Trinidad and Tobago. It consists of performers improvising in song or in rhythmic speech on a given theme before an audience, which take turns to perform. It is inherently competitive, and success is judged by the wit and the ingenuity of the performance.

== Art of extempo ==
It is characterised either by the “single tone”, consisting of four-line stanzas or the “double tone”, which has eight-line stanzas. There are four basic melodies common to extempo: “Sans Humanite”, “Matilda”, “Miss Mary Ann”, and “Big Bamboo”. The most widely used is "Sans Humanite". Another characteristic of extempo is that the performer must be able to think quickly since the subjects are handed out on the spot and the lyrics are then improvised.

== Extempo war ==
The competitive nature of extempo is reflected in the annual Trinidad Carnival with a formal competition for the title of National Extempo Monarch. Extempo War, or warring, is the practice of competitors attacking each other's efforts at extemporizing in the course of their own performance. It is not an essential part of competition, but is a regular feature, and an entertaining one. The acknowledged "Grandmaster of Extempo" was Lord Pretender, who was twice honored by the Trinidad & Tobago government for his services to calypso.

Extempo war may also be called simply Calypso War.

Not all extempo performance is competitive. Away from competition, formal roles for extempo performers are typically as emcees or hosts at private functions.

== Related oral/musical traditions ==
Extempo is similar to the African-American tradition of "the Dozens" in its competitive aspect, but may be distinguished in that the aim is not to improvise humorous abuse to an opponent, incorporating a given form of words, but to entertain an audience of one's competitors while extemporizing on a given theme. The abuse or sarcasm may be directed either at one's competitors or at subjects relevant to that theme, ideally both.

It is also similar to the United States tradition of freestyle rap.

== Notable extempo artists ==
- Lord Pretender
- Brother Resistance
- Big B
- Black Sage
- Brian London
- Gypsy
- Lady Africa
- The Relator (Willard C. Harris)
- Shortpants (Llewllyn Macintosh)
- Lingo
- Incredible Myron B (Myron Bruce)
