= Brian Mac Farlane =

Trinidadian artist

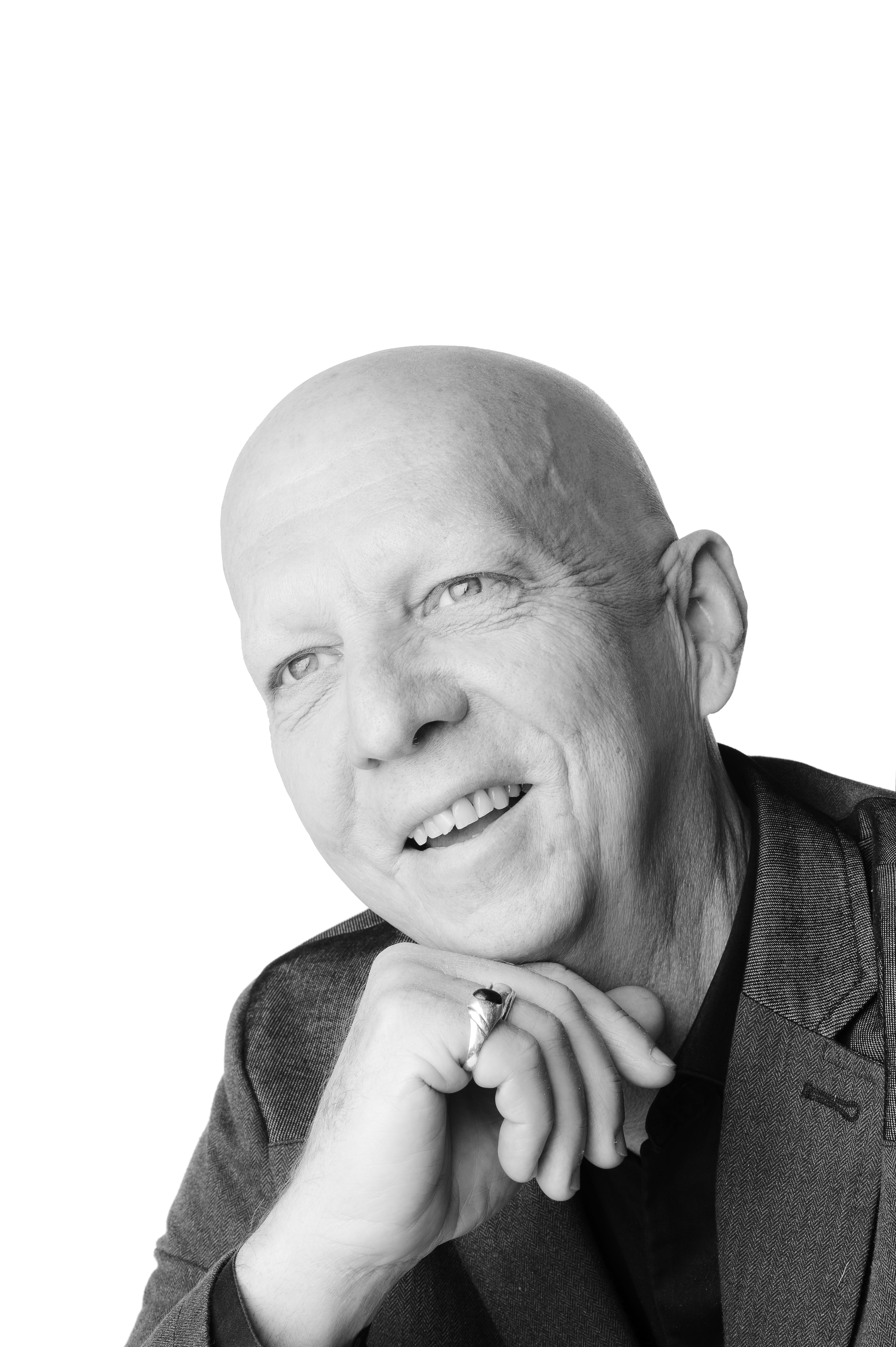
Brian Mac Farlane, 2019

Brian Mac Farlane (born 1957) is a Trinidadian artist, known for his work for the Trinidad Carnival, an occupation known as a "Mas Man" in Trinidad and Tobago.

== Early life ==
Brian Mac Farlane was born in 1957. His father was from Trinidad and his mother from Barbados. Mac Farlane grew up in Petit Valley, a suburb of Port of Spain in Trinidad and Tobago. He had frequent illness as a child due to an abnormal immune system and as a result he often struggled in school, and was also diagnosed with dyslexia during his childhood.

At the age of 15, Mac Farlane left school and began to work for the "Mas Man" and costume designer Raoul Garib. During his time working with Garib, Mac Farlane experimented and constructed miniature costumes with aluminium foil and paper napkins and began to develop his own artistic style. Garib also introduced Mac Farlane to Christopher Santos, another costume designer in Trinidad. Both Garib and Santos greatly influenced Mac Farlane's work throughout his career.

== Career ==
Despite his lack of formal training, Mac Farlane was able to work in art and design throughout the 1970s and 1980s. He mounted large installations in malls during the Christmas season which allowed him to become more well known in the community.

During the 1990s, Mac Farlane worked in the corporate sector designing spaces and serving as the event coordinator for various company launches, entertainment events, and cultural displays. It was also during this time that Mac Farlane began to gain recognition in competitions for his costume designs in the Trinidad and Tobago Carnival. In 1994, Mac Farlane won his first King of Carnival and Best Designer award for a King costume entitled "The Conquest- the Slaying of Medusa."

In the year 2000, Mac Farlane received attention for a Junior Queen costume that he designed for Rosalind Gabriel entitled, " Exodus the Power and the Glory". The costume won 17 awards, winning all of the competitions it was entered in. At the request of the Trinidad and Tobago government, this costume was also used in a cultural presentation for Prince Charles of the United Kingdom during his official visit to Trinidad and Tobago in 2000.

In 2005, Mac Farlane designed and lead his first full-scale Mas' Band presentation entitled "The Washing by Fire, By Water," for the Trinidad Carnival. He won the Band of the Year title in the Medium Category of the Trinidad and Tobago Carnival#Competitions. Since 2005, Mac Farlane has continued to produce presentations at Trinidad Carnival each year, all of which have won him multiple awards. "India—The story of Boyie" was the first time ever that Trinidad Carnival had an entirely East Indian theme large band.

Mac Farlane has previously stated that one of his main goals as a modern Mas' man is to preserve the tradition and true spirit of Mas' in Trinidad. Similar to one of his role models Peter Minshall, his work emphasizes creativity and theatricality. Mac Farlane often uses his Mas' themes to make social or political statements on the state of his country and the world. Mac Farlane has said that he wants his work to be a reflection of Trinidad's history with Carnival.

Mac Farlane's costume designs have also received attention from the international community. Mac Farlane will be designing and coordinating a cultural presentation for the 2012 Cultural Olympiadin London, England. Also in 2012, Mac Farlane will be featured in an exhibition at the Royal Ontario Museum on Trinidad Carnival and its reproduction in diasporic Caribbean communities throughout the world.

== Work outside Carnival ==
- Designed and produced theatrical production: " Miracle at Stollmeyers's" (1993, Trinidad and Tobago)
- Designed and managed function hosting Colonel Powell and later Rudolph W. Giuliani (1998, Trinidad and Tobago)
- Designed Coronation ball for Miss Universe Competition (1999, Trinidad and Tobago)
- Designed and managed the opening ceremony for the 5th Annual International Conference of Gas and Energy Producing Nations (1999, Trinidad and Tobago)
- Designed décor and coordinated a theatrical presentation for the official opening ceremony of the National Library (NALIS) (2003, Trinidad and Tobago)
- Organized and event managed the red carpet ceremony honoring Trinidadian Cricket Player Brian Lara (2006, Trinidad and Tobago)
- Designed a tourism theme park (2006, Trinidad and Tobago)
- Designed a cultural presentation for the opening and closing ceremonies for the Summit of the Americas (2008, Port of Spain)
- Designed the opening ceremony for the Commonwealth Heads of Government meeting (2008, Port of Spain)
- Designed Club Extreme in Barbados
- Designed and managed the launch of international resort Le Paradise (St. Lucia)
- Is currently Designing and choreographing a Cultural presentation for the opening 2012 Cultural Olympiad (2012, London)

== Philanthropy ==
Mac Farlane has donated his designs to various charities in Trinidad and Tobago. He remodelled and refurbished the Living Water Hospice. In March 2012, Mac Farlane began to refurbish the Living Water Mercy House, a home for people living with HIV and AIDS.
