= Rapso =

Trinidadian genre of music

- Stylistic origins: Soca; calypso
- Cultural origins: 1970s, Trinidad and Tobago

Other topics
- Music of Trinidad and Tobago

Rapso is a form of Trinidadian music that grew out of the social unrest of the 1970s. Black Power and unions grew in the 1970s, and rapso grew along with them. The first recording was "Blow 'Way" by Lancelot Layne in 1970. Six years later, Cheryl Byron (founder of the New York City based Something Positive Dance Company) was scorned when she sang rapso at a calypso tent. She is now called the "Mother of Rapso".

It has been described as "de power of de word in the riddim of de word". Though often described as a fusion of native soca and calypso with American hip hop, rapso is uniquely Trinidadian.

== History ==
Rapso music is itself an evolution of the chantwell or griot tradition of African music in the diaspora. It is called "the poetry of Calypso" and "de power of de word in the riddim of de word". Rapso is the poetic "rap" form of Trinbagonian music—the next evolutionary step of Calypso and Soca music. It also has origins in the oral tradition elements of the performances of traditional masquerade characters in Trinidad Carnival.

Traditional masquerade characters, such as the Midnight Robber, Pierrot Grenade, and the chantuelle, each have particular forms of poetic and musical speeches that echoed ancient African masking and poetic traditions. Rapso borrowed many of the rhythmic and performance elements of these forms.

The first wave of rapso music occurred with the invention of rapso by its pioneer Lancelot Layne in the late 1960s. The second wave occurred in the late 1970s with Cheryl Byron who was the first woman to perform poetry in calypso tents, and mushroomed in the early '80s with the work of Brother Resistance and the Network Rhythm Band, alongside other artists such as Brother Cetewayo and Brother Book. This wave mainstreamed rapso music in Trinidad and Tobago and World Music.

The third wave of rapso occurred with the advent of young groups including Kindred, Homefront and Boyz 'N The Road in the early 1990s. They were part of a musical movement entitled the "Kiskadee Karavan" that was led by businessman Robert Amar, who invested his money in the unleashing of the young musical genius of Trinidad and Tobago. The Karavan revolutionised Trinidad’s music by taking "traditional" forms such as the rapso and giving it modern production and promotional methods to take the music to stadiums in the native Trinidad and Tobago. This opportunity uncovered many talents on the ground, and created a series of anthemic musical singles. The song "This Trini Could Flow" by super-group Kindred took rapso into the 21st century and firmly entrenched the music as a form comparable to hip-hop and dancehall.

Modern Rapso music can be described today as the Trinbagonian equivalent of what is known as American rap music as groups like Boyz 'N The Road and Khay (from Boyz 'N The Road) produce and chant to beats and rhythms more heavily influenced by the modern American hip-hop music culture fused with R&B and Jazz, as opposed to the traditional or "Roots" rapso (with calypso and soca music). Nonetheless, traditional rapso continues to live on as super-group Kindred and 3 Canal maintain the balance with the calypso and soca music influences.

== Calypso influence on rap ==
The basic elements of hip-hop—boasting raps, rival posses, uptown throwdowns, and political commentary—were all present in Trinidadian music as long ago as the 1800s, though they did not reach the form of commercial recordings until the 1920s and 1930s. Calypso—like other forms of music—continued to evolve through the 1950s and 1960s. When rock steady and reggae bands looked to make their music a form of national and even international black resistance, they took calypso's example. Calypso itself, like Jamaican music, moved back and forth between the predominance of boasting and toasting songs packed with 'slackness' and sexual innuendo and a more topical, political, 'conscious' style.

== Terminology ==
The term rapso was not invented until 1980, when the revolutionary Network Riddim Band with its two chantwells Brother Resistance and Brother Shortman released Busting Out. Initially dominated by the children of the Black Power movement, changes came in the 1990s with the younger artistes adopting the art form, most significantly the bands Kindred, Homefront, 3 Canal and Ataklan.

== Sources ==
- van Leeuwaarde Moonsammy, Patricia (2010). "Warriors of the Word: Rapso in Trinidad's Festival Culture". In Diouf, Mamadou; Nwankwo, Ifeoma C.K. (eds.). Rhythms of the Afro-Atlantic World (PDF). University of Michigan Press. doi:10.1353/book.89. ISBN 978-0-472-02747-7.
