= Brother Shortman =

- Also known as: Rapso Rebel
- Born: Everard Romany; 11 October 1951 (age 74)
- Origin: Trinidad
- Genres: Rapso, rhythm poetry
- Years active: 1970s–present
- Formerly of: Network Riddum Band
- Website: myspace.com/rapsorebel

Everard Romany a.k.a. Brother Shortman, also known as Rapso Rebel, is a rhythm poet and musician from Trinidad and Tobago.

== Biography ==
Born in Trinidad in 1951, Brother Shortman (Bro. Shortman) became, together with Brother Resistance, the lead singer of the Network Riddum Band in 1979. They developed a hybrid of soca and rap that they called rapso, a genre for which they credited Lancelot Layne as originator.

Network Riddum Bands début album 1981, Busting Out, became a major hit, defining the musical genre that would come to be known as rapso. Busting Out was the first album to use the word rapso. After the release of the album Rapso Explosion, Brother Shortman left Network Riddum Band and did not appear on the music scene until 2004, when he released the album The Awakening Vol. 1 as Rapso Rebel, after living in Sweden for more than a decade.

== Discography ==
=== Singles ===
- "Busting Out", Squatters Chant (Everard Romany) / Dancing Shoes (Bro. Resistance) (1981)
- "Panic", (Everard Romany) (1982)
- "Long Live Kaiso", (Everard Romany) (1983)

=== Albums ===
- Rapso Explosion (1984)

== Early life ==
Everard Romany was the son of Rita and Claude Romany and the second of their 3 children. He attended Rose Hill Primary School and spent his early life as a community builder in East Port of Spain. His is a story of talent becoming derailed by drug addiction and eventually re emerging to continue the story of the Rapso Rebel in Sweden.
