= Grenada–Trinidad and Tobago relations =

Grenada – Trinidad and Tobago relations
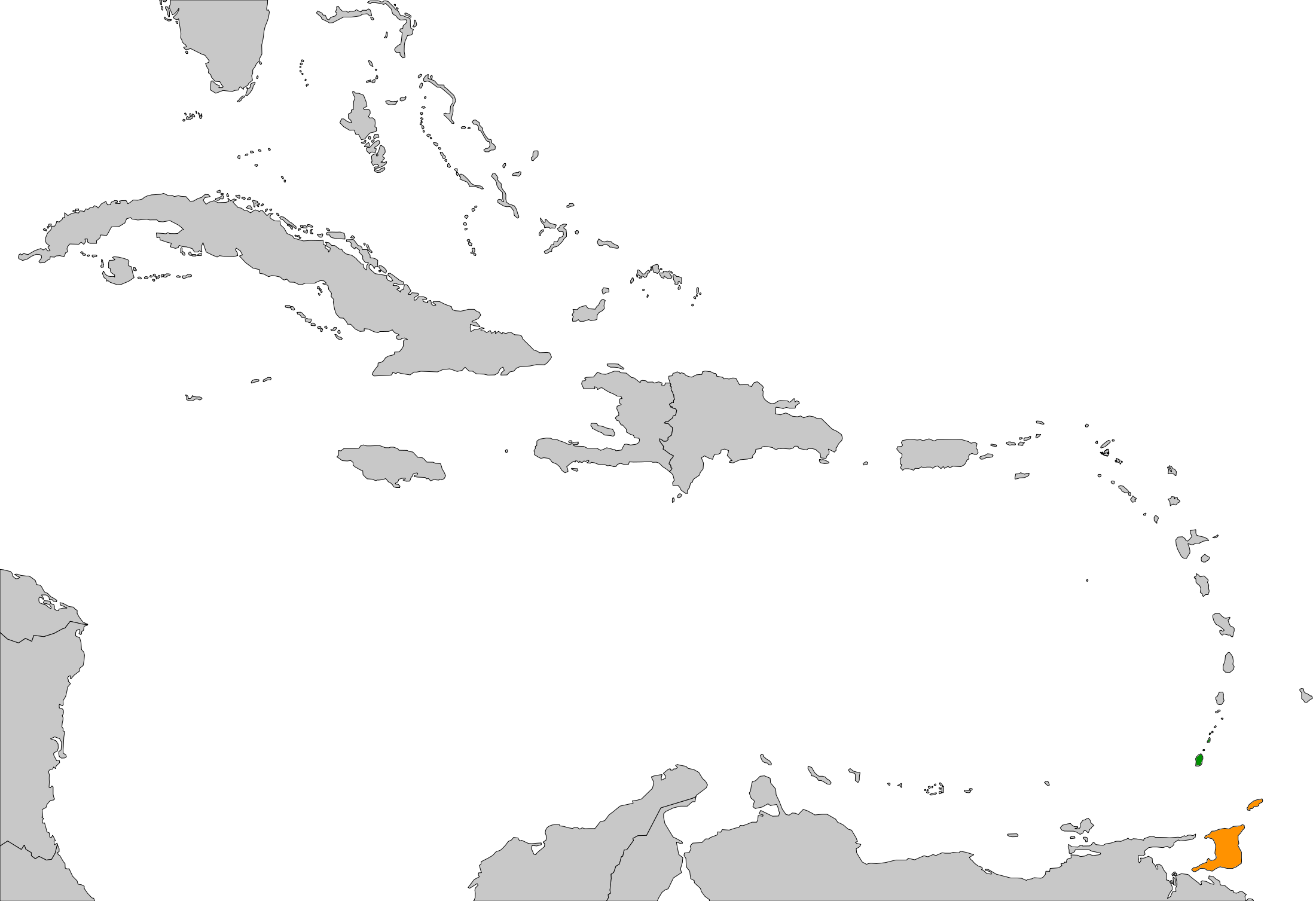

- Grenada: Trinidad and Tobago

Grenada–Trinidad and Tobago relations refers to foreign relations between Grenada and Trinidad and Tobago. The two countries have historical and cultural connections dating back to the 18th century. Both nations are members of the Commonwealth of Nations, Association of Caribbean States and the Organization of American States.

== Recent relations ==
In 2010, the governments of Grenada and of Trinidad and Tobago entered into discussions which eventually led to the adoption of a maritime boundary between Grenada and Trinidad and Tobago. This boundary was demarcated by The Joint Boundary Commission of Grenada and Trinidad sitting in the Republic of Trinidad and Tobago's capital, Port of Spain.

In 2011, Grenada and Trinidad and Tobago have begun a series of discussions on possible areas of co-operation and collaboration in the energy sector, especially regarding development of Grenada's offshore oil and gas sector.

In September 2012, the Grenadian Government and the Government of the Republic of Trinidad and Tobago signed a cooperation agreement for energy development. This agreement covers the joint exploration and exploitation of hydrocarbons in the maritime areas of Trinidad and Tobago and Grenada, which includes technical support and skills for oil and gas projects. The agreement was signed by the Trinbagonian Minister of Energy and Energy Affairs, Kevin Ramnarine, and the Minister of Finance, Planning, Economy, Energy and Co-operatives of Grenada, Nazim Burke.

== Bilateral agreements ==
Date	Agreement name	Law ref. number	Note
21 April 2010	Maritime Boundary Agreement		
3 September 2012	Framework Agreement for Cooperation in Energy Sector Development		

== Diplomacy ==
Of Grenada

- Grenada House, Port of Spain (consulate general)

Of Trinidad and Tobago

- St. David Parish (honorary consul)

== See also ==
- Grenadian Trinbagonian

== Sports ==
Both countries are part of the multi-national West Indies cricket team, with several players from both countries representing the board.
