= 3 Canal =

Trinidadian music and comedy group

- Origin: Trinidad and Tobago
- Genres: calypso, soca, rap
- Years active: Mid-90's - present
- Label: Independent
- Members: Wendell Manwarren; Roger Roberts; Stanton Kewley
- Website: 3canal.tt

3canal is a Trinidadian band and leading proponent of rapso, a musical style which combines elements of calypso, soca and rap. The group was formed in 1994 by Visual Artist Steve Ouditt and Performing Artists Wendell Manwarren and Roger Roberts. For the next 3 years they created and led their own Jouvert Band in the Trinidad Carnival. Jouvert is the pre-dawn ritual street procession which marks the opening of the Trinidad Carnival. In 1997 3canal expanded to include Stanton Kewley and John Isaacs, they recorded their first song Blue, the theme song for their Jouvert Band that year. Since then 3canal has released numerous albums from the late 1990s to the present, including a greatest hits collection that includes songs from 1997 to 2004. 3canal celebrated its 25th anniversary as a musical entity in 2022.

== Discography ==
- 1998: A Rakak Kie Bonay (Rituals Music)
- 1999: The Fire Next Time (Rituals Music)
- 2000: 3 Canal 2000 (Rituals Music)
- 2001: Heroes Of Wha? (Rituals Music)
- 2005: Jab Jab Say... (Machete Music)
