= Extempo Monarch =

Award title

Extempo Monarch is the title awarded to the winner of an annual extempo competition held at the Trinidad Carnival.

A number of contestants (in 2006 there were 8) compete in preliminary rounds. The Final consists of a head-to-head contest between the two most successful performers.

In the preliminary rounds contestants must perform improvised calypso lyrics according to the conventions of the genre on topics drawn at random from a prepared list. In the Final round the contestants improvise on the same topic.

== 2006 Extempo Monarch ==
The 2006 Final was contested by Black Sage and Sheldon John singing on the topic "Kudos To Radio Trinbago".

The winner and Extempo Monarch 2006 was Sheldon John.

== Recent Extempo Monarchs ==
- 2007 Joseph "Lingo" Vautor-La Placeliere
- 2008 Joseph "Lingo" Vautor-La Placeliere
- 2009 Joseph "Lingo" Vautor-La Placeliere
- 2010 Winston “Gypsy” Peters
- 2011 Sheldon John
- 2012 Lady Africa (Leslie Ann Bristow)
- 2013 Lady Africa (Leslie Ann Bristow)
- 2014 Brian London
- 2015 Joseph "Lingo" Vautor-La Placeliere
- 2016 Winston “Gypsy” Peters
- 2017 Winston “Gypsy” Peters
- 2018 Myron "Incredible Myron B" Bruce
- 2019 Brian London
- 2020 Brian London
- 2023 Brian London

== See also ==
- Calypso music
- Extempo
- Trinidad Carnival
- International Soca Monarch
