= Cheryl Byron =

Trinidad-born artist and cultural advocate (c. 1947–2003)

- Born: c. 1947; Trinidad and Tobago
- Died: 17 June 2003 (aged 56); Brooklyn, New York, United States
- Occupations: Professor; poet; singer; dancer; visual artist
- Years active: 1966–2003
- Known for: Rapso, dance, founder of Something Positive
- Notable work: "Vision", "Ancestral Chant"

Cheryl Byron (c. 1947 – 17 June 2003) was a Trinidadian-born visual artist, dancer, singer and social and cultural advocate.

== Biography ==
She started her studies in her native land, Trinidad and Tobago, where she also studied dance with Neville Shepard and acted with the Caribbean Theater Guild.

While on tour in New York City, her artwork won her a scholarship to the New School University, where she studied fine art. Byron then obtained Bachelor of Arts and Master of Arts degrees in English from City College (CUNY) while maintaining her professional life, including becoming in 1976 the first woman to perform her own original brand of poetry in a calypso tent in Trinidad.

Byron was a pioneering performer of rapso and dub poetry. Considered the "Mother of Rapso", she was inspired by the artistry of Lancelot "Kebu" Lane. According to Rhythms of the Afro-Atlantic World: Rituals and Remembrances by Mamadou Diouf, "Cheryl Byron's poetic performances made visible by the female acts of anticolonial resistance that were carried out in religious and spiritual practice." She studied dance with Pearl Primus and became a member of the Primus Borde Earth Theater. She then became Primus' special assistant, accompanying her on her numerous teaching and choreography assignments, including with the Alvin Ailey American Dance Theater.

Byron performed on national and international stages. Her talent took her to such places as Canada, Guyana, Barbados, Jamaica, London, Kenya, and Nigeria. She was an ordained Reverend Mother in the Spiritual Baptist faith, and a professor at Medgar Evers College and the College of New Rochelle in Brooklyn, New York. She also taught at City College, and New York City Technical College. Byron played one of the lead roles in the PBS film Homecoming, became a published poet in an anthology of poetry, Woman Rise, and was a featured artist on an album of dub poetry, Womantalk, on Heartbeat Records.

Byron founded Something Positive, a New York City-based performing arts and education organization dedicated to preserving the art and culture of the African Diaspora and its cross-cultural influences. Established in 1981, the ensemble of dancers, singers and musicians performs an original repertoire both nationally and internationally. Something Positive is under the Artistic Direction of Michael Manswell.

Cheryl Byron died in New York at the age of 56. Something Positive released VISION, a compilation of Byron's music, in 2012.
