= Lord Blakie =

Trinidadian calypso and steel-pan musician

Carlton Joseph
- Image of Lord Blakie at a concert in 2001
- Born: November 3 1932; San Juan, Trinidad
- Died: January 6 2005; Trinidad and Tobago
- Occupations: Calypsonian and Steelband musician
- Years active: 1953—2005

Carlton Joseph (Known as Lord Blakie) was a Trinidadian Calypsonian and musician, regarded as one of the greatest Calypsonians of his era, along with Mighty Sparrow, Lord Kitchener and Lord Melody. He was born in Trinidad on November 3, 1932, and died on January 6, 2005.

== Biography ==
Blakie was born in Trinidad in 1932, and grew up in San Juan Trinidad which was a rough area known for “Badjohns”, this upbringing is what gave Blakie some of his song ideas about violence and Badjohn culture. His first song called “The Steelband Clash” came out in 1953 he started out his career as “Warlord” (sometimes “Warlord Blakie” and “D’Warlord”) He then changed his Calypso name to Lord Blakie (sometimes spelt as “Lord Blakey”). He won the Carnival Road March competition with “The Steelband Clash” in 1954, and he won it again with “Maria” in 1962. He was best remembered for his iconic laugh and humour which features in a lot of his songs, he also was known to have large bursts of energy and joy despite coming from a “Badjohn” environment. Lord Blakie is said to have loved the steel pan and the instrument featured in many of his songs. Blakie also participated in friendly banter with all the other Calypsonians (which was common, various Calypsonian made songs about other Calypsonians), one such example is his song “Sparrow Lost” which was a comedic commentary on Mighty Sparrow losing the “Calypso King” title in the 1964 Calypso king of the world competition, (Blakie commented on Sparrow’s Grenadian heritage as in Trinidad there was an anti-Grenadian immigrant sentiment), 1964 being regarded as one of the most competitive years with Lord Kitchener, Mighty Sparrow, Mighty Bomber, Lord Blakie, Nap Hepburn, Mighty Composer and Young Killer all competing, with Mighty Bomber inevitably winning. Lord Blakie was also the mentor and teacher of another Calypsonian/Soca musician called Black Stalin.

Blakie stayed as an icon well after his hay day, being a common name and performer in Trinidad into the 21st Century, and in 2024 his life was made into a play created by Dawad Philip. He is regarded by many as one of the greatest Calypsonians.

== Discography ==
- Steelband Clash (1952)
- Send them back (1960) (Referring to sending Grenadian immigrants back to Grenada)
- Maria (1962)
- De Doctor Eh Dey (1964)
- The Riddle (1967)
- Soucouyant (1969)
- Chinese in the bus stand (1977)
