= Ataklan =

Trinidadian musical artist

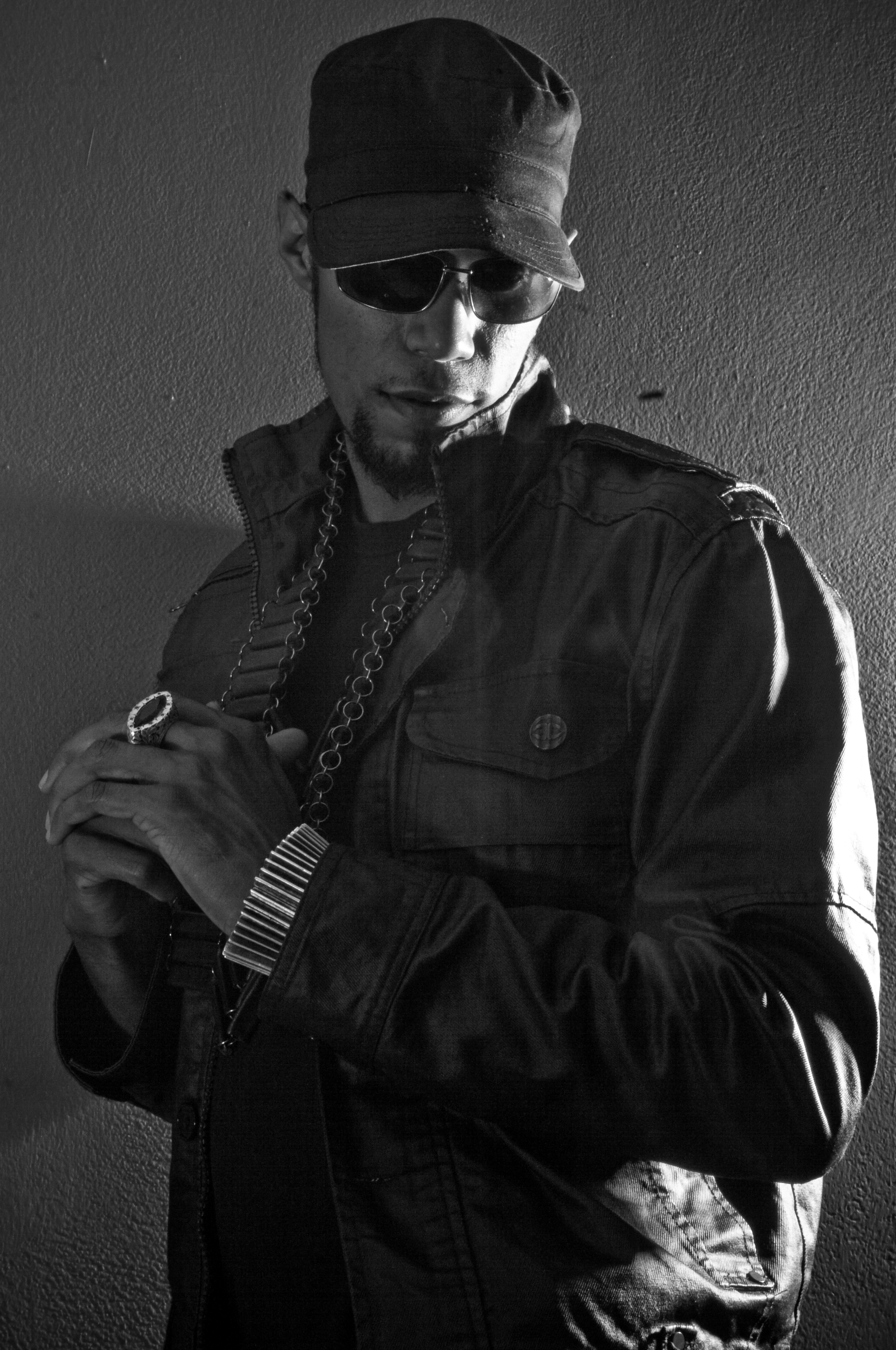
- Ataklan

Background information
- Born: Mark Antonio Jiminez; Chinapoo, Morvant, Laventille, Trinidad and Tobago
- Genres: Rapso, Soca, Reggae
- Occupations: Musician, producer, song-writer
- Label: TAJ Records

Mark Antonio Jiminez, better known by his stage name Ataklan is a Trinidadian singer-songwriter and performer primarily of the modern rapso tradition. Ataklan has been referred to as "Trinidad's answer to Beck" and a "fiercely independent songwriter and singer and arguably the most original artist to have emerged on the island since David Rudder". Since his emergence in 1993, Ataklan has released tracks including "Flambo", "Naked Walk", "Flood on the Main Road", "Shadow in de Dark", "Soca Girl" and "Caribbean Swagga", among numerous others.

== Early years ==
Born and raised in Chinapoo, Morvant, Laventille, Trinidad), Ataklan underwent vocal and performance training in his formative years from Ras Shorty I, who has been recognized as the inventor of what we now know as modern Soca music. Ataklan was a foundation member of the four-member Rapso group called Homefront from 1992 to 1993 under the Kiskidee Karavan. Ataklan was also the founder and manager of a youth musical initiative called "The Laventille Bucketeers", which consisted of 12 young Laventille residents playing original music compositions and rhythms on plastic buckets. The Bucketeers had appearances on Local Talent shows including Party Time, winning best original act and scoring second place twice in a row. Subsequent to this, the artist founded his own record label, TAJ Records (named after his son Tyrone Anthony Jiminez), operating out of his hometown.

== Career ==
In 1998 Ataklan released his first album, Atanomical. This was a collaboration with Machel Montano and during this time, the artist toured the US with the band Xtatik for one year. Ataklan's second album, Atamorphosis, was released in 1999 to critical acclaim. The artist's 2001 album Atavival includes tracks such as "Blessed Sheep" and "Red House". Ataklan's latest album saw him spending time in Jamaica to work with the likes of legendary Jamaican producer Mikie Bennett. This album includes well-known tracks such as "Shadow in the Dark" and "Smile", which have been in rotation on Synergy TV, Gayelle TV and Caribbean Tempo. "Caribbean Swagga" as well as "Without You", featuring Wippa Demus, which has been in rotation on Jamaica's airwaves Irie FM and Zip FM since its initial release. Ataklan has shared international stages with artists including Buju Banton, Shaggy, Bunji Garlin, Lauren Hill, Baaba Maal, Finley Quaye, Nitin Sawhney, Graham Massey & the Bollywood Toolshed, and Bongo Maffin.

== Collaborations ==
Ataklan has collaborated with artists including Sizzla Kalonji, Machel Montano, Alonestar, Joint Pop, $helshok, KMC, Ghetto Flex, Bunji Garlin, Mistah Shak, Levy Myaz, Choppa-Chop, Bunny Rugs of ThirdWorld, Dean Fraser and Terri Lyons. Ataklan has also collaborated with local greats such as Andre Tanker, Ras Shorty I and Mighty Shadow. Colin Thorpe, formerly of production/remix outfit T-empo, produced Autumn Groove featuring Ataklan's house track "Sun Starts to Rise", which has been featured on DJintheMix. Ataklan has collaborated with the Jamtech Foundation of the RedOne Production Company to explore the phenomenon of Dubstep and Trap-Hip-Hop music, with "3Gs" and "Liberty" among their first released tracks. Trinidad and Tobago Carnival season saw the artist working with internationally signed Soca artist Bunji Garlin on their smash hit ‘Renegade Soca’ which prominently featured both artists’ lyrical prowess and powerful delivery and garnered a great deal of international and local attention within the industry. The artist also had several other successful Soca releases, including "Robber Rave", a local take on Rave music from the perspective of the "Midnight Robber". The song was featured as part of Berlin Carnival Midnight Robber Mas'. More recently, Ataklan has worked with EchoSlim a US-based producer with Trinidadian roots. Their song "Mad Calypso" — which can be described as a futuristic hybrid approach to Rapso, Calypso and Soca coming together with EDM sensibility, Trinidadian flair and Dancehall street culture — had its local release in Summer 2015.

== Writing and theatre ==
Ataklan performed in the local musical theatre production of Geraldine Connor's Carnival Messiah, in which he played the role of Midnight Robber from 2003 to 2004. He also collaborated with Connor on the writing of a play called Street Opera in 2004. Ataklan's music was featured in Asha Lovelace's film Joebell & America, based on a story by Earl Lovelace.

== Discography ==
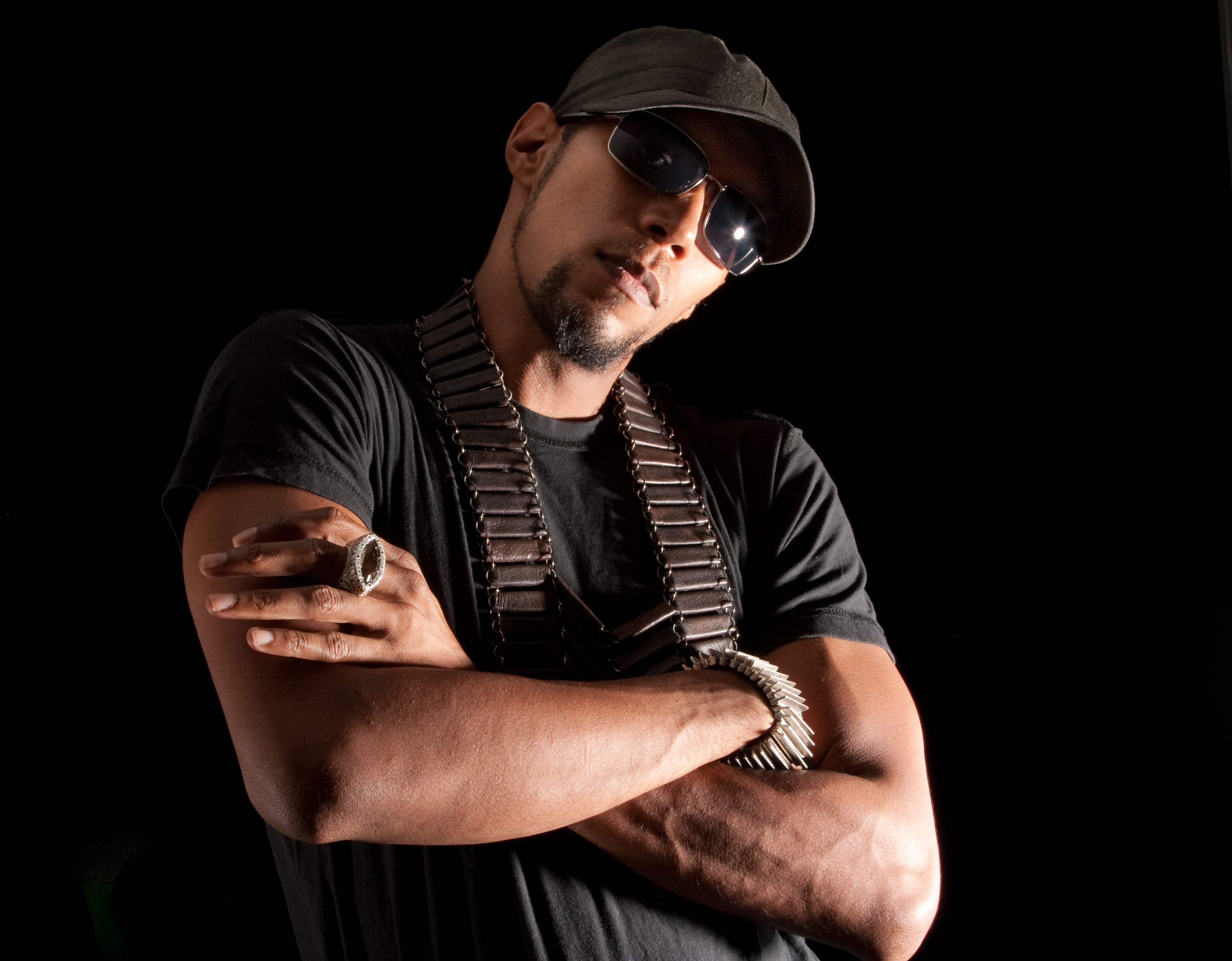
Trinidadian-born singer Ataklan

=== Atanomical ===
(1998)

1. "Robber Intro"
2. "Mastife"
3. "Rapso Blunt" ft Machel Montano
4. "Hyper Fan (Interlude)"
5. "Put It Up"
6. "Tiger Woods"
7. "Pananie" ft Machel Montano
8. "Spanish Fly" (ft Karen Hinds)
9. "Out Ah Mova"
10. "Flambo (Remix)"
11. "Rapso Blunt (Extended)"
12. "Outro"

=== Atamorphosis ===
(1999, TAJ Records)

1. "Weh It Come From (Intro)"
2. "Natural and Irie"
3. "Carnival Time Again"
4. "Naked Walk"
5. "Song Boy Killin (interlude)"
6. "I'm Ah Hero"
7. "My God Doh Sleep" (ft Ras Shorty I)
8. "Since Yuh Gone"
9. "Aye I Aye"
10. "Mountain Song"
11. "De Hill " (ft Laventille Bucketeers)
12. "De Flood"
13. "All Star Show" (ft KMC, Ghetto Flex, Bunji Garlin)
14. "Wise Old Bird (Interlude)"
15. "Equality Song"
16. "Spider Jam" (ft $hel$hok)
17. "Naked Walk (In De Garage)"
18. "Spanish Fly (Latin Mix)" (ft Karen Hinds)
19. "Since Yuh Gone (Unplugged)"
20. "(Outro)"

=== Atavival ===
(2000, TAJ Records)

1. "I Am Me"
2. "Plastic Bag"
3. "Election"
4. "Time Tuh Run"
5. "18 Guava Season"
6. "Rhumba"
7. "Pamela"
8. "Bim Bim" (ft Andre Tanker)
9. "Red House"
10. "18 Guava Season (Stones Mix)"
11. "Blessed Sheep"

=== One Morvant Night ===
1. "You are a Star (Love Reincarnation)"
2. "Caribbean Swagger"
3. "Smile (ft Terri Lyons)"
4. "Morvant Knight"
5. "Ghetto Romance"
6. "Shadow in the Dark"
7. "Poor Man Dream" (ft The Mighty Shadow)
8. "Tomorrow Today"
9. "Kingston Town"
10. "Without You" (ft Wippa Demus)
11. "The Sun Starts to Rise"
12. "Home" (ft Bunny Rugs)

== Performances ==
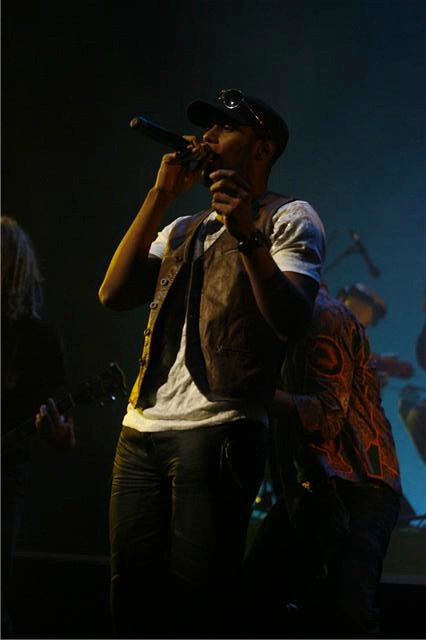
Ataklan at an on stage performance

Ataklan was a part of the intimate concert series in 2011 at the Trinidad Theatre Workshop. The artist performed at the Trinidad and Tobago Launch of the Mix at the Casa de Ibiza in 2010. Ataklan also performed at the Launch of the Cloth multi-purpose Caribbean Propaganda Space in 2012. Ataklan was also the headline act for opening of the Commonwealth Heads of Government People's Forum 2009.

In March 2015, Ataklan was part of the SXSW Music Film and Interactive Festival held in Austin, Texas as part of the performance for the SOL Life Official SXSW Showcase alongside EchoSlim. The performance was well received, high-energy and the artist was called back to the stage for an encore at the end of his set. An indelible mark was left during the showcase and it integrated well with the other performing American acts. In April 2015, Ataklan was part of the Tobago Jazz Experience performing as the headline act at the Jazz on the Esplinade. He also was a speaker and workshop facilitator for several Music Management and Performance workshops held as part of the EduJazz series that saw the artist working with and lecturing eager primary school children in Tobago on the ins and outs of the music business. In June 2015, Ataklan performed at the well-attended Glastonbury Festival of Music and Contemporary Arts as part of the JusNow & Bunji Garlin performance set.

=== International performances ===
- Caribbean Music Expo: represented Trinidad 2002
- Futuresonic British Council 2002 and small tour of pub venues in the UK with top Djs
- 2003 Haiti trip for United Nations in Eradicating Small Arms in Ghetto communities
- Contact Theatre, Manchester
- Black Pussycat – Manchester
- Opening of Dr Hutton's Art exhibition, UWI, Jamaica
- Puerto Rico
- Boat Yard, After Dark, Barbados
- Nuyorican Poet's Cafe, Manhattan, NY
- Aristocrat Manner, Warehouse, Brooklyn, NY
- Mahai Temple, Ramada Hotel, Miami
- Club Casablance, Toronto, Ontario, Canada
- SXSW, Houston, Texas
- Glastonbury Festival, Pilton, UK

== Legacy and influence ==
Ataklan received an NJAC Top 20 Calypso Award in 2003 for his track "Do Away with the Violence" and placed 4th in the NJAC Young Kings Competition that same year. In 2006, he received an award from the University of the West Indies for his contributions to the Rapso artform. Ataklan was featured in the "Legacy" issue of Generation Lion, a Trinidadian magazine featuring youth culture and young local heroes.

The Soca Awards Organization (SAO) 2010 International Soca Awards (iSA) nominated the track "Smile" featuring Terri Lyons for Best Soca Collaboration of the Year.

Ataklan's videos have been credited for their innovation and creativity showcasing Caribbean essence and talent, notably the "Naked Walk", "Sun Starts to Rise", "Shadow in the Dark" and "Smile" videos. "Riddim inna Meh" – a melodious Soca song and video released for Carnival 2015 was in the top 2 of the TEMPO Cross Caribbean Countdown for 8 weeks (peak position #1). Ataklan also wrote and performed the theme songs for the Purple Dragon International and for West Indies Cycling Team. Ataklan's soca song "Trini Party" was used as the theme song in the Malibu Sunshine Rum worldwide commercial.
