= Burrokeet =

Trinidad and Tobago Carnival figure

The Burrokeet (alternative spellings: Burroquite, borokit, borokite, bourriquite) is a "donkey-man" character traditionally portrayed in Trinidad and Tobago Carnival. The name derives from the Spanish word burroquito (little donkey), the character's costume being constructed so as to give the illusion of a dancer riding a small burro or donkey. This masquerade was brought to Trinidad by Venezuelan settlers.

The burrokeet costume is a well-decorated donkey's head made from coloured paper and attached to a bamboo frame. The masquerader enters through a hole at the back of the "donkey"'s neck and carries the reins in his hands, with the animal's body fitted around his hips, thereby creating the illusion of being the donkey's rider. The donkey's body is covered in a long satin skirt and has a sisal rope tail, sometimes decorated with flowers. The bit and bridle are made of coloured cord. The "rider" wears a satin shirt and a large matador straw hat and dances in a way that mimics the antics of a donkey, making it caper and bow. A dance called Burriquite with origins in Venezuela is also performed.

== Sou-Marie ==
The burrokeet masquerade, associated with the South American mainland and Venezuelan Spaniards, has become linked with the "Sou-Marie" character that derives from East Indian culture brought to Trinidad by indentured labourers. The Sou-Marie (or Sumari / Soomaree) mas, performed to tassa drum music and today only seen rarely in the rural areas, features what is called the harrichand dance: "The costume consists of an ornately decorated bamboo frame in the shape of a horse with a hole in the 'horse′s' back. The masquerader enters this hole and is attached to the frame by a series of straps. He holds the reins of 'the horse' and dances. He moves the 'horse' forward and backward to give the illusion of riding on horseback. Drums and singing in Hindi usually accompany the dancing." In the Tamil Nadu (Madras) state of South India, this dance is known as "Poikkal Kuthirai Aattam".
