= Gros Jean =

Trinidadian slave and first Calypsonian

Gros Jean (Gro Jan)
- Died: 1820; Diego Martin, Trinidad, Trinidad and Tobago
- Citizenship: Slave in the British Empire
- Occupation: Musician (Kaisonian)
- Employer: Pierre Begorrat
- Known for: "Creating" Kaiso (Calypso) music
- Title: Maît Kaiso (Master of Calypso)

Gros Jean (also "Big John" or "Fat John") was a slave who was owned by French slave owner and planter Pierre Begorrat. Gros Jean is known as the founder of Kaiso (which would later become Calypso) music and the first Kaisonian (Chantwelle in the language of the time).

== Legend of founding Kaiso music ==
Around the year 1802 Begorrat owned a slave called Gros Jean who had the talent of singing in French (His French was partially broken, and was probably an early form of Patwa which was spoken by descendants of slaves in a Trinidad and other French colonies) and playing the guitar at the same time, Begorrat loved Gros Jean's singing and showed him off to other slave owners and his friends. He was awarded the title "Mait Kaiso" (Master or Kaiso). Gros Jean made his own songs and sometimes made derogatory pieces against people his master did not look favourably upon, Gros Jean would be dressed in lavish clothes and made to singing about sensitive information that Begorrat had uncovered about his enemies.

There is also an alternative legend to the founding of Kaiso, it is sometimes stated that Begorrat had a nasty temper and his wife and family would bring over Gros Jean (who they had heard singing), and make him sing to calm down Begorrat.

One of his songs was recorded and went as follows:

Begorrat est diab'la, c'est un

Begorrat est diab'la, c'est deux

Begorrat for, cruel et mauvais

Begorrat roi-la dans son pays.

The song contains Patwa/Creole elements such as the "La" following the word it describes and the word "Diab" (which evolved into "Djab"), the word Mauvais also evolved into "Mové"
