= Calypso War =

Form of calypso song

Calypso War is a form of calypso music that has existed since at least the turn of the twentieth century. Originally it was sung in patois or French creole. The classic war form is an eight-line stanza, the first four lines in a minor key, then modulating into the major, and returning to the minor with the refrain "santimanite" ("sans humanité" in patois, in English "without humanity").

Calypso War emerged among the black lower-class population in Trinidad after emancipation from slavery. It was a competitive and entertaining form of lyrical improvisation which saw performers attempt to outdo each other in wit and verbal skill, often to defend or boost their reputation.

A War verse by Growling Tiger:

When I was a child at the age of five
And my dear old grandfather was alive
He would sit me upon his knee
And say "boy listen to me"
He said "boy I will tell you your birth" [i.e. fortune]
"and it is to rule over men on this earth".
So I'm sorry for the molesters who mess with this Tiger

Santimantay

A War verse by Mighty Terror:

If you want to see what I say is true
Just call a Jamaican singer to you
And ask him to sing extemporaneously
You will see he hasn't this ability
But if you call me or Lord Kitchener
We will sing from January to December
Why? For we are born Trinidadians and true calypsonians
Here in Great Britain

== See also ==
- Extempo
