= List of Trinidad and Tobago Carnival character costumes =

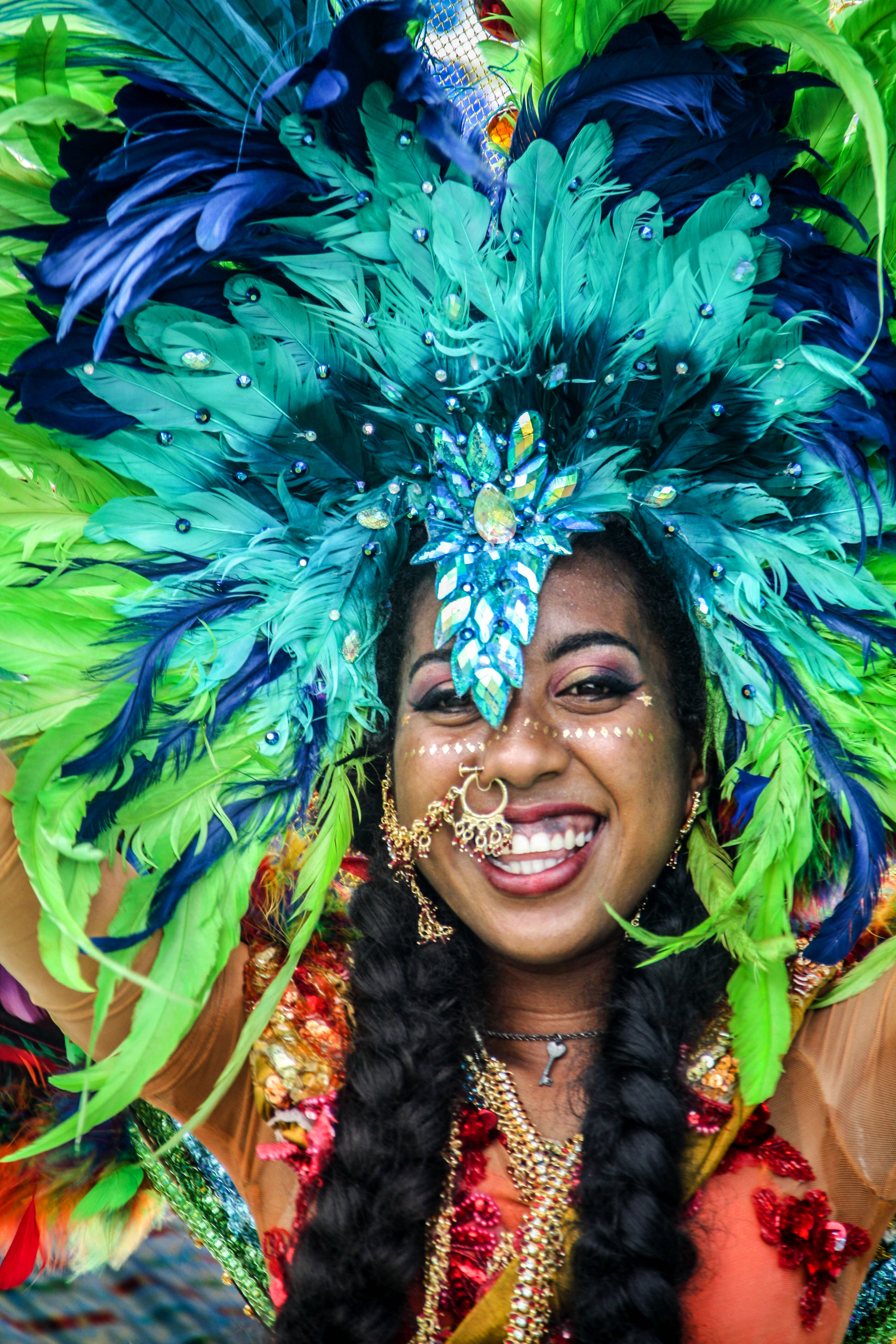
Trinidad carnival

A wide variety of costumes (called "mas") depicting traditional Trinidadian Carnival characters are seen throughout the Trinidad and Tobago Carnival. After emancipation in 1838, freed slaves combined African masking culture with French colonial influence to create characters that parodied the upper-class customs and costumes of Carnival. The costumes made by recently free people "poke fun at the original French plantocracy..." During slavery on the islands, French and English colonists did not allow enslaved and mixed-race people to partake in carnival, resulting in people of color to have carnivals in their communities.

In its early history, carnival in Trinidad and Tobago was a form of resistance to the slaveholding class and a way for enslaved and free people to continue to practice African customs. The enslaved combined cultural elements from the Indigenous peoples of the Caribbean and fused it with their cultures from West Africa and other West Indian practices that created carnival traditions in the islands. Over the years, characters would rise and drop in popularity, and by the late 20th century many became overshadowed by more modern, "bikini and bead," costumes. Carnival for Trinidadians and Tobagonians is a time for rebirth, healing, and transformation.

The following is a list of some of the traditional characters, which symbolize the origins of the Trinidad and Tobago Carnival, and their costumes.

== African Mas ==
When this masquerade first came about, the costume was composed of rags and the masqueraders would hold spears as props in order to create the image of an "uncivilized Africa" However, a Carnival bandleader, George Bailey, created decorative costumes that portrayed a much brighter depiction of African beauty.

This mas is no longer common in Trinidad Carnival.

== Baby Doll ==
This character is meant to be a parody of a mother who has a bastard child. The main components of this costume are a pleated dress, a bonnet, and most importantly, a doll. Masqueraders would walk up to men on the streets and accuse them of being the father of the child. Usually, the masquerader will continue to embarrass said man until they give her or him some money. Although this costume is mostly portrayed by young women, men will sometimes combine this costume with a high-pitched voice for comedic effect.

During carnival, "They roam the streets during Carnival, accusing male spectators of being their child’s father and demanding immediate child support. Often, the masquerader refuses to leave, becoming louder and more insistent until the alleged father responds with a few dollars." The Baby Doll characters’ performance depicts the sexual exploitation and struggles faced by women. Overseers coerced women into sexual acts, and the law offered them no protection.

== Bats ==
Most bat costumes are black or brown, but white bats are also fairly common. The mask usually covers the entire head of the masquerader and the wings can span up to 15 feet wide. The movements of a masquerader would try and mimic the flapping of bats' wings, but a masquerader will also crawl or dance on their toes (typically called the "Bat Dance").

== Burrokeet ==
The typical costume is made to look as if the masquerader is riding a donkey, which is usually made out of papier-mâché. The "rider" will also wear a large sombrero and clothes with multiple embellishments, especially flowers. The Burrokeet also comes from East Indian descent and has another, female variation called Soumayree.

== Cattle ==
The original carnival character costume was made out of rice bags and covered in the leaves of the plantain tree. The mask, like most character masks was made out of some sort of papier-mâché. Now, most cow costumes consist of a cream-coloured loose shirt with tight pants that have gold accents. The full papier-mâché mask was also replaced by a hat or headband with cow horns. Since this is a costume that is meant to be done in a group, matadors and picadors can also join the group and "challenge" the cows. Other members of the group would dress up as a Mad Bull and charge at the matadors, picadors, and bystanders. The Mad Bull of the group would stop charging at certain bystanders if they hand money to a member of the group.

== Clowns ==
Clowns are dressed in baggy clothing with big red noses, wild hair, big shoes, and sometimes a white face. The bandleader of the costume group would wear a crown to show that he is the King Clown. Older costumes would also have an exaggerated paper mask instead of face paint.

== Dame Lorraine ==
This character originally came about to be a parodied version of a rich planter's wife. The typical costume consists of exaggerated breasts and backside, which were made by stuffing pillows or other fillers into the dress or undergarments of the costume. Over the years, the costume shifted from being worn comedically by mostly men to being worn almost exclusively by women.

== Devils ==
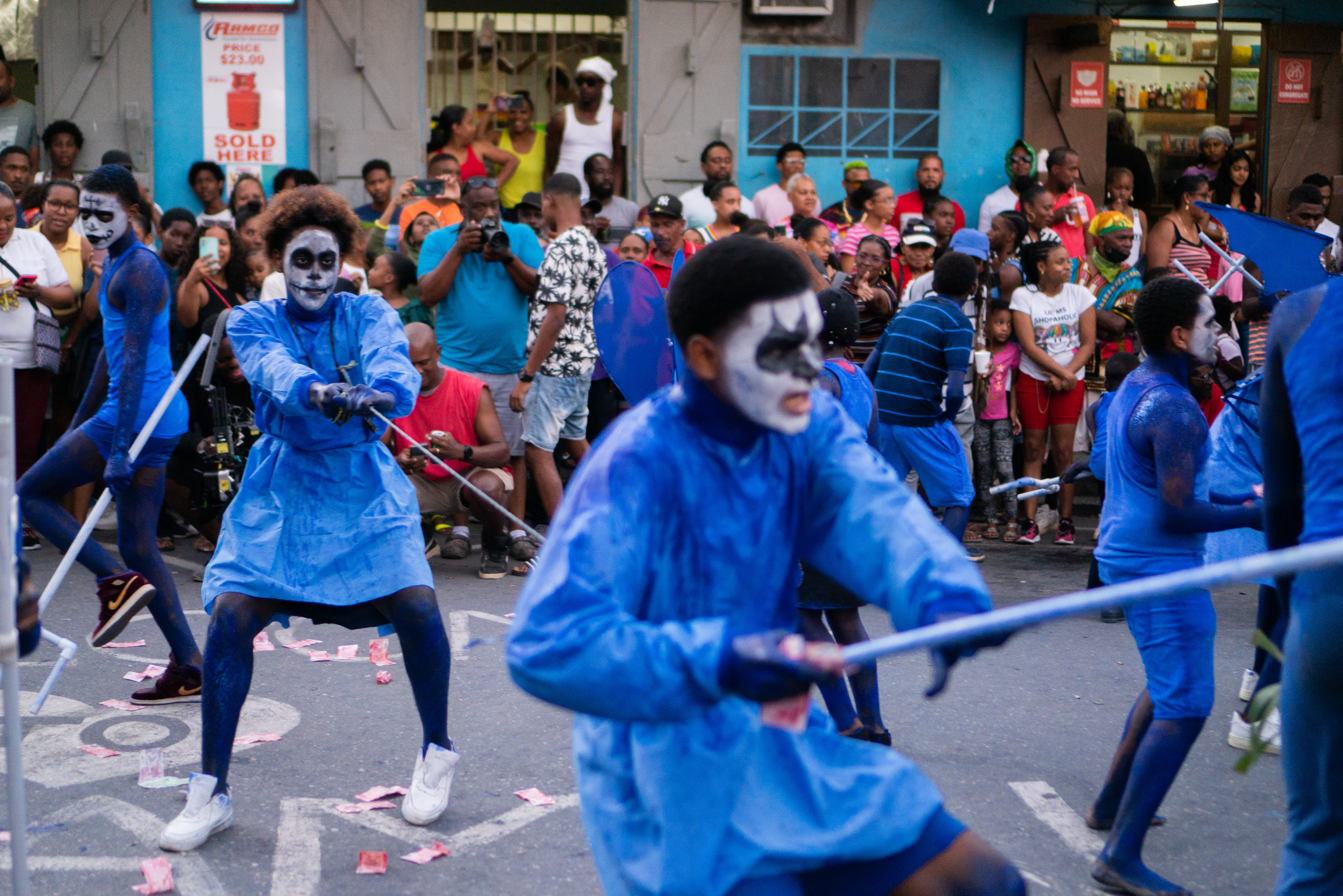
The Junior Jab or Junior Blue Devil competition.

There are multiple variations of the Devil, or devil-like creatures, in carnival costumes. In modern day, the devil costumes all look very similar, but there was once a time when every devil costume was very distinct. The most traditional one is called The Bookman. This character is known for his giant paper mask and the possessions he always has handy: a book and a pencil to write down prospective souls.

Variations of the Devil include:

- Prince of Dark (also named Bookman or Beelzebub)
- Prince of Darkness or Dragon Devil: wears a dragon mask and white clothes
- Lucifer: the king of the entire band
- Satan: second only to Lucifer
- Gentleman Jim or Gentleman Devil: wears a top hat and a scissor-style tailcoat
- Jab Jab (also known as "Coolie Devils"): The name of this character comes from the French Patois word for "Devil." The costume consists of loose fitting, satin trousers, called "Kandal", with a satin blouse that has bells hanging from the end. The prop carried by this character is a whip that a masquerader can crack at bystanders or other Jab Jabs.
- Jab Molassie: This is one of the oldest carnival characters. Similar to Jab Jab, his name means "Molasses Devil" because the original character would be covered in molasses. Molasses were a cheap and easily available product to make a costume for freed slaves from sugar plantations. The Jab Molassie is also known for jumping around wildly and scaring bystanders with their sudden movements. An optional addition to the costume is to have a chain tied around the waist for another character to restrain the Jab Molassie.

The Devil is also usually part of a band that has a diverse group of beasts. Other costumes or characters that would accompany the devil are:

- Imps: a "sprightly" version of the devil
  - King Imp: the leader of the imp band
  - Agitania: carries a key to open the gates of hell
  - Marker: carries a flag to direct the band
  - Axe Man: carries an axe
  - Bell Man: carries a bell
  - Scale Man: carries a scale
- Beasts:
  - King Beast: The leader of the beasts
  - Stray Beast: The costume for the stray beast would be just as elaborate as that of the king. The Stray Beast would walk next to the king and protect him.
- Key Man: This character is responsible for dancing in order to open any waterways for the band to pass; he is noted for his fear of water.
- Ladies in Waiting: This is the more decorative, female version, of the Devil costume.
- Queen Patroness: The leader of the Ladies in Waiting, her costume would be the most decorative of all the ladies.

== Dragon ==
Many of the Dragon characters or costumes are categorized with the Devil. The most common exception to this categorization is the Red Dragon, which is also a very old and traditional Trinidadian character. The origins of this character come from the Bible and other religious texts. The dragon character may also be referred as the King Beast if the dragon is a part of a devil band. He cannot cross through water, especially not holy water, so a Key Man is a vital companion for the Dragon.

== Indians ==
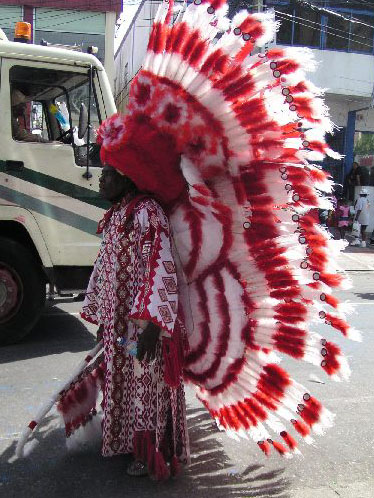
An Indian costume with an exaggerated headdress.

The Indian character is one of the most common costume depictions in Carnival because of its versatility in terms of design, price, and band size. American Indian characters in carnivals pay tribute to the Maroon communities that formed during slavery and to the African Indigenous marriages in North America under Spanish colonial rule. During slavery, enslaved Africans escaped and established independent Maroon settlements. Some of these Maroon communities mixed with the local Indigenous population. Two Indian Mas characters the Fancy and Wild Indians, are based on depictions of Native Americans in popular culture and Hollywood.

There are multiple variations of the Indian costume:

- Indian Chief: his headpiece is sometimes so elaborate that it becomes too heavy for the masquerader's head and must be supported by some other mechanism
- Fancy Indians: the costume's main purpose is to be aesthetically pleasing. Some Indian bands may focus on one colour, like Blue Indians. According to news article, Trinidad and Tobago Newsday, "...fancy Indians emerged as a moving tribute to the Indigenous people of the hemisphere". Fancy Indians incorporate masking traditions from New Orleans.
- Wild Indians/Red Indians/Guarahoon: this specific Indian costume is based on a Venezuelan tribe called the "Warao." This is one of the oldest instances of Indian costume in Carnival.
- Black Indians: similar to the simple Indian costume except that the face is painted black
- Authentic Indians: Depict an accurate costume of American Indians.

== Jamèt ==
In the context of Carnival, especially traditional Carnival characters, the name "Jamèt" comes from the French word diametre which is meant to describe the "other half" (i.e. the underworld). Over the years the context of the name has changed. Jamèt people are retired prostitutes that are always masked. The outfits are very decorated with flowers, feathers, silk fabrics, jewellery, gold chains, and colourful ribbons. Jamèt men are sometimes also named "sweet men"; the male costume is known for having pants with a very low waist-line. Masqueraders would talk to bystanders in sultry voices in order to collect money, and under certain circumstances, the women would expose their breasts by opening their bodices. Because of the obscenity of this character, it became less common after the 1920s.

== Midnight Robber ==
One of, if not, the most popular characters of the Trinidad Carnival is the Midnight Robber. This braggadocious character is mostly known for using his "robber voice" for vivid storytelling, which is said to mimic a griot or West-African storyteller. Although his stories are mostly meant to show his own bravery and valor, the Midnight Robber's speeches can also be commentary or parody of current events. The Midnight Robber desires to become the King of the Robbers by out-talking or outwitting all of his rivals. His aspirations come from a history of wrongdoing in his family, which is meant to mimic the emancipation and history that influenced the celebrations of the Trinidad and Tobago carnival. The Midnight Robber does not have one official story; every masquerader or storyteller can give their own version of his story. One version of this story is Nalo Hopkinson's 2000 novel Midnight Robber, which actually depicts a female "Robber Queen" named Tan-Tan.

The costume consists of black pants, an enormous hat, a blouse, and a cape. The black costume, especially the cape, is usually decorated with skulls and tombstones. The hat may sometimes have decorative tassels or skulls hanging from the brim. Although some sources say that The Midnight Robber's hat is influenced by American Cowboy culture, it is more likely that his hat is meant to mimic a chief's hat from the coastal regions of Nigeria. The Midnight Robber also carries a gun and coffin in either hand. The gun, which would be fake, is used to scare bystanders into placing money into the coffin.

The Midnight Robber may sometimes be a part of a raiders band, but he is mostly a sole masquerader. When two robbers encounter each other at Carnival, they may duel through the use of words to prove who has the most "villainous bravado".

== Military ==
Similar to the Sailor mas, the military mas is meant to mimic actual American military. The costume for this character could vary between the more elegant and formal military suits to the camouflage-coloured suits worn in battle. Military costumes could also imitate the military of other countries, especially those that had influence in the Caribbean, such as France, Venezuela, and Great Britain. Military costumes have ranged from modern American Soldiers and British Palace Guards to Confederates and Nazis. One of the reasons this mas became popular is because it can later be used for formal events and will not be discarded, so the higher expense is justified.

== Minstrels ==
The minstrel character is a decorative depiction of a European minstrel. A group masquerading as minstrels would carry instruments such as a banjo, maracas, or rattlers. Some costumes have a resemblance to the style of Uncle Sam with pin-striped shirts and a top hat. Some masqueraders also choose to paint their face white as a parody of real American minstrels that would sometimes dress up with Blackface.

== Moko Jumbie ==
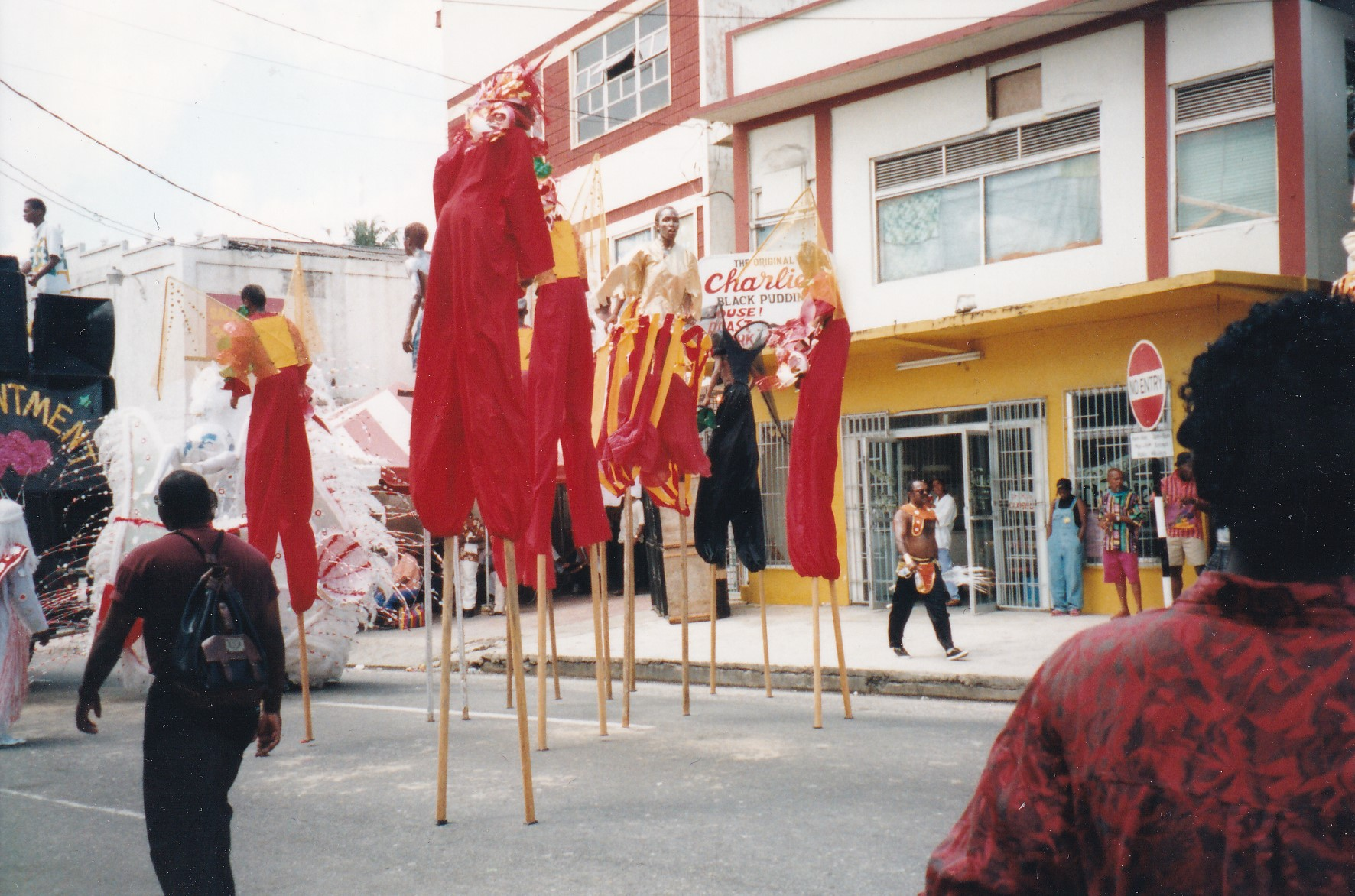
Moko Jumbie stilt dancers

The two-part name of this character means God of retribution (Moko) spirit, particularly an evil one (Jumbie). The typical costume of this character is known for its tall stature, more specifically: the masquerader walks on giant stilts that can be up to ten feet tall. The character is of African origin. Originally the character wore a hat made of dried wild cucumbers, and the stilts were striped. Moko Jumbie is sometimes accompanied by a dwarf to accentuate his height.

== Negue Jadin ==
The name Negue Jadin means "Field Slave" and this character dates back to times when only plantation owners and aristocrats could participate in Carnival. They would imitate the dress and customs of their own slaves. After slaves were freed, they adopted this as a costume. Over time, the mas also included sticks for characters to fight each other. However, this costume remains as a representation of the evolution of Carnival and its history because it is now extinct. Other variations of the name are "Negre Jardin" and "Batonnier".

== Pai Banan ==
This character has a similar costume to the original Cattle or Bull costumes; the body is covered in plantain leaves and the masquerader wears some sort of full head mask. Instead of a papier-mâché cow mask, the headpiece consists of a small, white knitted hat with two long antennae sticking out of it. The meaning of the character's name, "Banana trash," is evidently caused by the body of the costume.

== Pierrot Grenade ==
Pierrot Grenade is the parody of another character called Pierrot. The "Grenade" at the end of his name is meant to show his connection to Grenada, which is what makes him/her a character more specific to the Caribbean as opposed to Pierrot, who is also recognized by the French. His costume consists of rags and a white mask that may cover the masquerader's entire face or just the outer-most parts of his head. Pierrot Grenade prides himself on his intelligence; more specifically, his ability to spell any word.

== Sailors ==
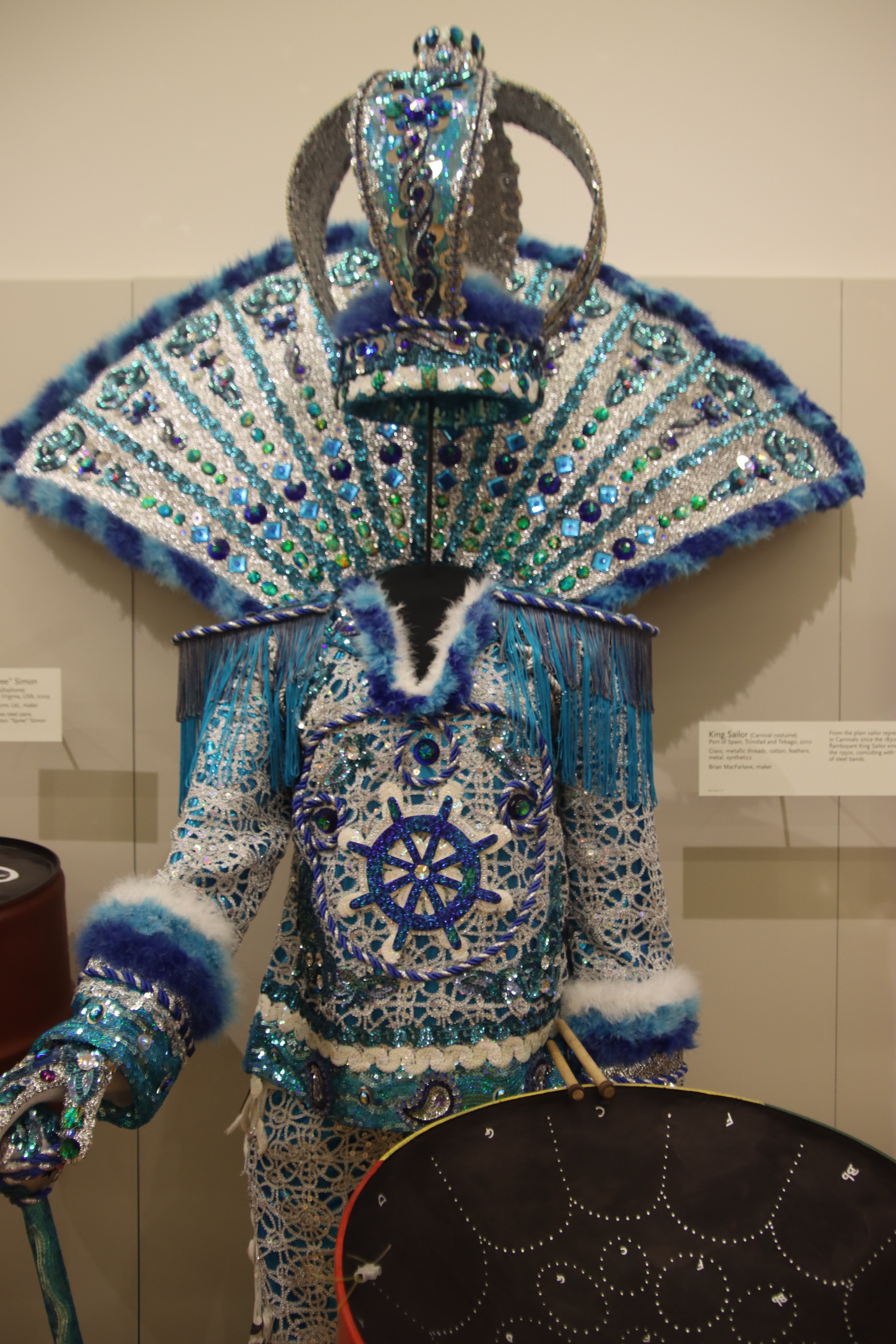
King Sailor costume

The Sailor mas was introduced into Carnival when naval ships from America and France came into Trinidad in the 1880s. Similar to the Indian mas, this masquerade is noted for its versatility. The costume can be as costly, decorative, or historically accurate as the masquerader wishes. This mas is also easy for groups since the characters are not as specific or singular.

There are multiple variations of the sailor costume:

- King sailor: the leader of the band or group of sailors. The King Sailor would have the most decorative costume. Before the 1940s, the King Sailor was mostly noted for a papier-mâché mask that included a giant, crooked nose that sometimes even had warts on it. This depiction of the King Sailor, or the King Sailor in general, is no longer a common Carnival costume. He is usually followed by a group of trumpeters, which would be called fancy sailors.
- White sailor: the costume is meant to resemble a coast guard
- Free French sailor: the costume has a black beret with the name of the boat on the hat
- Flour bag sailor: a cheaper, more simple version of the sailor costume. This sailor is sometimes called a "bad behavior" sailor for his drunken actions.
- SeeBees and Ships company: this sailor character is sometimes referred to as the "bad behavior sailors." This character is meant to embody the desires and habits of drunken sailors so the costume would include items like a cigar, a bottle, or women's lingerie. A masquerader acting as one of these sailors would walk around mimic the sporadic and unbalanced movements of a drunk. SeeBees would walk together in groups of up to 8 with the arms around each other's shoulders. The sailors would then walk diagonally alternating from left to right to mimic the swaying movements of a boat. When the band is large enough, the rows of sailors swaying could create the effect of a storming sea. SeeBees have the same actions as any generic drunken sailor, but they are differentiated by their detailed costume. The costume would include detailed American insignia that would be on actual naval uniform, and, as a bonus, the costume could include fake radio equipment.
- Fireman: the fireman is in charge of the engine room, this costume is easily noted by its addition of large goggles, a long iron rod and metallic dust In a large band, the fireman would follow after the trumpeters.
- Fancy sailor: this is the most general term for the sailor costume. It refers to any sailor costume that is highly decorative.

== Warriors ==
Some warrior characters are a variation of the Indian costume, and even depict actual historical Indian warriors such as the Aztecs, Mayans, or Incas. The most traditional of the masque is the Juju Warrior. These warriors were said to practice witchcraft.
