= Trinbago Unified Calypsonians' Organisation =

Professional body representing calypsonians

The Trinbago Unified Calypsonians’ Organisation (TUCO) is a professional body representing the interests of calypsonians in Trinidad and Tobago and working to promote calypso music nationally and internationally. TUCO was established in 1993 and incorporated by an Act of Parliament in 1998. TUCO serves as the governing body for calypso in Trinidad and Tobago.

== History ==
The Trinbago Unified Calypsonians’ Organisation was formed in 1993 by the merger of the Calypsonians' Association with the Trinbago Calypsonian Organisation. It was incorporated by Act No. 33 of 1998 of the Parliament of Trinidad and Tobago.

In 1998 the government gave TUCO control of the national calypso contests, which had previously been managed by the National Carnival Committee, a state-controlled body. TUCO was given the responsibility of selecting and training judges for the competition and introduced a Calypso Queen, and later a Calypso King competition in addition to the Calypso Monarch competition.

With the cancellation of Carnival in 2021 as a result of the ongoing COVID-19 pandemic, TUCO organised virtual calypso tents.
