= Brother Resistance =

Trinidad and Tobago poet and musician (1954–2021)

- Also known as: Lutalo Makossa Masimba
- Born: Roy Lewis; 24 October 1954
- Origin: Trinidad and Tobago
- Died: 13 July 2021 (aged 66) Port of Spain
- Genres: Rapso, rhythm poetry
- Occupations: Musician, Rhythm Poet, Performer
- Years active: 1970s–2021
- Formerly of: Network Riddim Band
- Website: www.brotherresistance.com

Lutalo Masimba (24 October 1954 – 13 July 2021), born Roy Lewis and known professionally as Brother Resistance, was a rhythm poet and musician from Trinidad and Tobago. He died on 13 July 2021, after being diagnosed with cancer.

== Background and career ==
Born in 1954 as Roy Lewis in East Dry River, Laventille, Trinidad and Tobago, he began writing poetry in primary school, and went on to study at Queen's Royal College. He was influenced by Trinidad's 1970 Black Power movement to become conscious of his African identity, and he would eventually change his name to Lutalo Masimba in 1982, in order to better reflect his heritage. He assumed the soubriquet "Brother Resistance" when he began performing and chanting his poetry at school. He went on to further studies at the University of the West Indies, St. Augustine, graduating with a B.Sc. degree in Social Sciences with History in 1980.

Brother Resistance became, together with Brother Shortman, the lead singer of the Network Riddim Band, a Trinidadian ensemble, in 1979. They developed a hybrid of soca and rap that they called "rapso", a genre for which they credited Lancelot Layne as originator.

The band was considered subversive by the authorities, and their rehearsal space and offices were destroyed by the police in June 1983. The group released their first album, Roots of de Rapso Rhythm, in 1984, which was followed by Rapso Explosion and Rapso Takeover in 1985 and 1986 respectively. International performances brought recognition from overseas, changing the attitude of the T&T government, who selected Brother Resistance as their cultural delegate to the World Festival of Youth and Students in Korea. His best known song was 1987's "Ring de bell", in which he advocates symbolically ringing the bell for justice and freedom.

In 1992, Brother Resistance was honoured with a national award, the Hummingbird Medal.

He appeared at New York's New Music Festival in 1992 and in 1993 at the International Dub Poetry Festival in Toronto, Ontario, Canada.

In 2002 he was nominated for a Cacique Award for his performance as Aldrick in Earl Lovelace's dramatization of The Dragon Can't Dance.

In 2017, Brother Resistance was inducted into the Queen's Royal College Hall of Honour for his contributions to art and culture in Trinidad.

He was president of the Trinbago Unified Calypsonians Organisation (TUCO).

He died aged 66 on 13 July 2021, at the West Shore Medical Private Hospital, Western Main Road, Cocorite, Trinidad and Tobago.

== Solo discography ==
=== Albums ===
- Touch De Earth with Rapso (1991)
- Heart of the Rapso Nation (1992)
- De Power of Resistance (1996), Rituals
- Let Us Rejoice (2001)
- When De Riddum Explode (2001)

=== Singles ===
- "Tonite Is De Nite" (1987), Riddum Distribution Network
- "Jah Never Fail Me" (2001), Blue Flame
