= Lancelot Layne =

Lancelot Layne (died 28 July 1990) was a rapso artist from Trinidad and Tobago.

== Biography ==
Lancelot Layne was born to a Ms. Ethel Strawn (née Serrano) and raised in Gonzales, Trinidad, a village near Port of Spain. He had a start in many local singing shows and showcase forums in and about Trinidad. During his career, he travelled around the world giving lectures and shows at many music institutions and universities, and was one of the first artists to bring the music of Trinidad and Tobago to the rest of the world.

Layne took many trips to Africa, after studying African history. A 1998 United Nations Radio programme described the links between calypso and highlife music, focusing on an exchange of visits between Layne and high life musician Koo Nimo of Ghana. In later years, Layne joined the Orisa faith. He had a son, Brian Llenwyn Layne, and twin daughters, Niasha and Anuska, who are accomplished pannists.

He is often described as being the founder of rapso; his 1970 song "Blow Away" was the first rapso recording, although the term was not coined until 1980. Many of his most remembered songs were not recorded, including the song "Strike Squad", which he composed for his local football team. "Get Off The Radio" was a protest song about the imbalance of radio airplay between local and foreign works.

In 2016 German reissue company Cree Records/Bear Family Records released a comprehensive compilation album of Lancelot Layne's work. The artwork for the album was done by Trinidad based Painter Peter Doig.

== Discography ==
- 1971 Afro'dadian/Blow'way Antillana
- 1972 Carnival Calypso Hits (LP)
- 1974 Neo Calypso (LP)
- 1975 Endless Vibrations/Soul Train
- 1975 Dat is Horrors/Kaiso For Mout
- 1975 Who Could Help Me/Make Life Easy On Me
- 1976 Yo Tink It Sorf/Chant
- 1976 Doh Dig No Blues
- 1977 These Boots Are Made For Walking/If I Were You
- 1980 Dis Pan Is For You (LP)
- 1982 Get Off The Radio
- 2016 Blow'Way (2LP/2CD, Cree Records)
