= Grenadian Trinbagonians =

Trinidad and Tobago residents of Grenadian origin

Total population
- 7,851 (born in Grenada) (2011)

Regions with significant populations
- 272 (Port of Spain); 94 (Mayaro–Rio Claro); 427 (Sangre Grande); 85 (Princes Town); 125 (Penal–Debe); 549 (Siparia); 250 (San Fernando); 139 (Arima); 363 (Chaguanas); 415 (Point Fortin); 1,139 (Diego Martin); 2,277 (San Juan–Laventille); 919 (Tunapuna–Piarco); 632 (Couva–Tabaquite–Talparo); 164 (Tobago)

Languages
- English · French · Languages of Grenada

Religion
- Christianity; Islam

Related ethnic groups
- Grenadians · Trinidadians and Tobagonians · Afro-Caribbean people

Grenadian Trinbagonians are citizens or residents of the Republic of Trinidad and Tobago whose ethnic origins lie fully or partially in Grenada. Movement between the neighbouring islands dates to the late eighteenth and early nineteenth centuries, when Trinidad became a key point in regional flows of enslaved Africans and their descendants, and later in intra-Caribbean labour migration. In the 2011 Population and Housing Census, 7,851 usual residents of Trinidad and Tobago were recorded as being born in Grenada.

== History and settlement ==
Inter-island connections between Grenada and Trinidad intensified from the late eighteenth century, when Trinidad emerged as what historians describe as a "hinge" between an incoming African diaspora and secondary movements of African-descended populations within the Caribbean and towards the South American mainland. After the abolition of the British transatlantic slave trade in 1807, planters in Trinidad continued to acquire enslaved people from older plantation colonies via an illicit inter-Caribbean trade: between 1811 and 1833, an estimated 6,000–10,000 enslaved Africans were purchased from territories including the Bahamas, Grenada, Saint Vincent and Barbados. This traffic brought persons of Grenadian origin to Trinidad under conditions of slavery.

Following Emancipation in 1838, formerly enslaved people and so-called "Liberated Africans" dispersed across Trinidad and Tobago. Settlements expanded along the East–West corridor from Cocorite and Diego Martin through Port of Spain to St. Joseph, Tunapuna and Arouca, and southwards to districts such as Couva, Claxton Bay, Oropouche and Gasparillo.

In the early twentieth century, Grenadians continued to move to Trinidad, particularly to the oil belt of south Trinidad where the expanding petroleum industry created new labour demands. One of the most prominent Grenadian migrants was labour leader Tubal Uriah Butler, who was born in Bluggo Cottage, Georgetown, Grenada, on 21 January 1897. Butler attended St George’s Anglican School in Grenada and served in the British West Indies Regiment during the First World War before returning home to organise returned soldiers. He migrated in 1921, working as a pipe-fitter at the Roodal oilfields and later becoming a Baptist pastor and trade union organiser. Butler helped to organise a hunger march from the oilfields to Port of Spain in 1935 and oilfield workers' strike in 1937, which are regarded as foundational for the modern trade union movement in Trinidad and Tobago.

Trinidad's oil industry and trade unions have also been important sites of political mobilisation linking Trinidad and Tobago to wider Caribbean struggles. In the 1970s and early 1980s, the Oilfields Workers' Trade Union (OWTU), based in south Trinidad, developed close connections with the New Jewel Movement in Grenada and used its industrial leverage to support anti-imperialist campaigns in the Eastern Caribbean, including calls for an oil embargo against the authoritarian government of Prime Minister Eric Gairy.

== Demographics ==
Official statistics in Trinidad and Tobago record country of birth rather than ethnic ancestry, so data on Grenadian Trinbagonians are framed in terms of Grenadian-born residents. The 2011 Population and Housing Census reported 7,851 usual residents of Trinidad and Tobago whose place of birth was Grenada, 3,404 males and 4,447 females.

== Notable people ==
=== Grenadian ancestry ===
- Destra Garcia
- Fay-Ann Lyons
- Trevor McDonald
- Billy Ocean
- Superblue

=== Grenadian-born ===
- Mighty Sparrow
- Tubal Uriah Butler
