= Calypso tent =

Performance venue during Carnival season

Calypso tents are venues in which calypsonians perform during the Carnival season. They usually are cinema halls, community centers, or other indoor buildings which have seating and stage arrangements to host the entertainers, guests and patrons; or outdoor shows which are held in parks or, more famously, in the Queen's Park Savannah. Some of these tents are held at many venues, called Roving Caravans or Roving Tents.

Such venues are still called "tents" because calypsonians all used to sing on stages which were literally covered by a tent. The first such tent was organised by a calypsonian whose sobriquet was Railway Douglas. As time went along, buildings and other empty spaces that were properly arranged were also used, but the name stuck.

Although traditional calypso has lost ground to soca and party music, the Tents remain popular venues and still serve as a launch pad for many young artists.

== See also ==
- Trinidad and Tobago Carnival
