= Trinidad and Tobago Carnival =

Annual event held in Trinidad and Tobago

Carnival
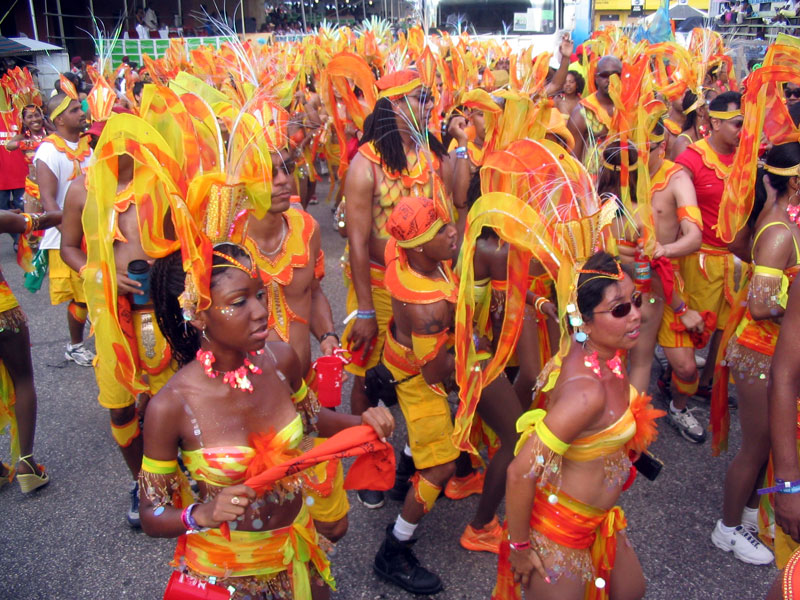
- Members of a costume band parade on the streets of Port of Spain
- Observed by: Trinidad and Tobago
- Type: Cultural
- Significance: Week before Lent
- Celebrations: processions, music, dancing, and the use of masquerade
- Date: Monday and Tuesday before Lent
- Duration: 14 days
- Frequency: Annual
- Related to: Caribbean Carnival, Mardi Gras, Carnival, Shrove Monday, Ash Wednesday, Lent

The Trinidad and Tobago Carnival is an annual event held on the Monday and Tuesday before Ash Wednesday in Trinidad and Tobago. This event is well known for participants' colorful costumes and exuberant celebrations. There are numerous cultural events such as "band launch" fetes running in the lead up to the street parade on Carnival Monday and Tuesday. Traditionally, the festival is associated with calypso music, developed by Afro-Trinidadians in 17th century Trinidad; however, Soca music has begun to replace calypso as the more popular musical genre for Carnival. Costume (sometimes called "mas"), stick-fighting, limbo, and steelpan competitions are important components of the festival.

Carnival, as it is celebrated in Trinidad and Tobago, has spread to many other Caribbean islands as well as several cities worldwide. These celebrations include Toronto's Caribana, Miami's Miami Carnival, Houston Carifest, London's Notting Hill Carnival, as well as New York City's Labor Day Carnival.

Some of the biggest bands in Trinidad Carnival are Harts, Tribe, and Bliss.

== Origin ==
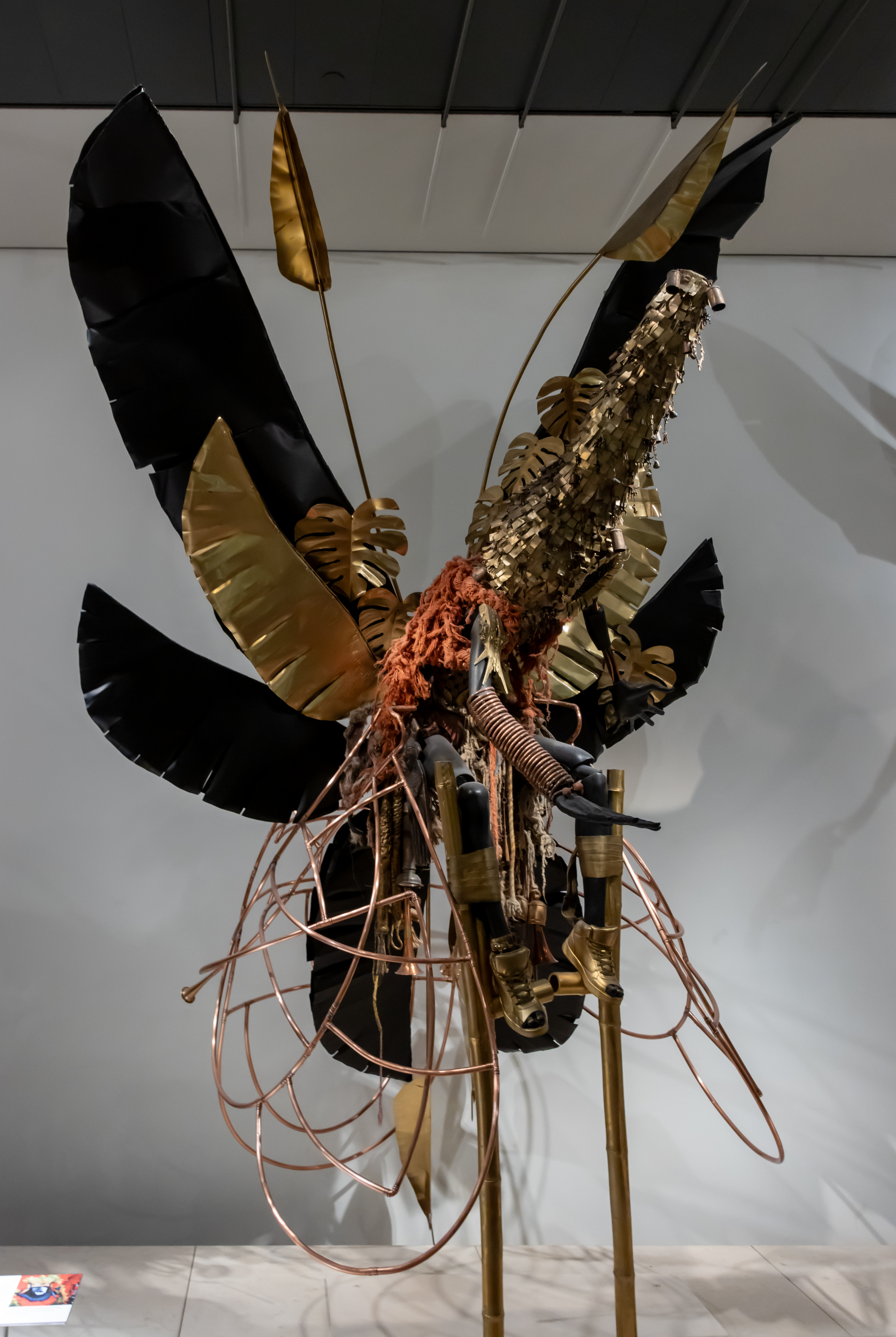
Historic Trinidadian carnival costume at the British Museum

The annual Carnival in Trinidad dates back to the 1780s, when an influx of immigrants from the French West Indies emigrated to Trinidad in response to the Cédula de Población. These immigrants included French planters and 'free coloureds' (free people of mixed race), as well as enslaved Africans. The Mas tradition started in the late 18th century with French plantation owners organizing masquerades (mas) and balls before enduring the fasting of Lent. Enslaved Africans, who could not take part in Carnival. They are said to have staged their own mini-carnivals, but using their own rituals and folklore and imitating or mocking their masters' masquerade balls.

Enslaved Africans also formed parallel celebration called "Canboulay". Canboulay (from the French cannes brulés, meaning burnt cane) The festival was characterized by drums, singing, calinda dancing, chanting, and stick-fighting. Canboulay is considered is a precursor to Trinidad and Tobago Carnival, and has played an important role in the development of the music of Trinidad and Tobago.

Calypso music was developed in Trinidad in the 17th century from the West African Kaiso and canboulay music brought by African slaves imported to that Caribbean island to work on sugar plantations. These slaves, brought to toil on sugar plantations, were stripped of all connections to their homeland and family and not allowed to talk to each other. They used calypso to mock the slave masters and to communicate with each other. Many early calypsos were sung in French Creole by an individual called a griot. As calypso developed, the role of the griot became known as a chantuelle and eventually, calypsonian. Additional traditions were introduced to Trinidad by enslaved Africans during the 18th century. These include the calinda, a form of martial art involving stick-fighting. The calinda is likely of African origin, and is accompanied by music and dancing.

In 1833, the British government passed the Slavery Abolition Act, and Emancipation took effect August 1, 1834. After Emancipation, freed Africans first celebrated their freedom on 1 August the anniversary of their emancipation, and soon began celebrating emancipation during the Carnival season. As part of this transformation, they started carrying burning sugarcane in celebration of Canboulay. The carnival soon featured dancing by men and women in masks.

During the mid- and late-1800s, the colonial government tried various ways to suppress Carnival and Carnival festivities. These prohibitions resulted in civil disorder, including the Canboulay riots of 1881 and 1884. In 1884, the colonial government passed the Peace Preservation Act, in an attempt to prevent violence breaking out during the Carnival. The Act prohibited public carrying of torches, drumming, blowing horns, and stick-fighting (or the assembly of ten or more people with sticks). It also established the official start of Carnival as 6:00 A.M. (the Monday before Lent).

Steelpan

Stick fighting and African percussion music were banned in 1881, in response to the Canboulay Riots. They were replaced by bamboo "Bamboo-Tamboo" sticks beaten together, which were themselves banned in turn. In 1937 they reappeared, transformed as an orchestra of frying pans, dustbin lids and oil drums. These steelpans (or pans) are now a major part of the Trinidadian music scene and are a popular section of the Canboulay music contests. In 1941, the United States Navy arrived on Trinidad, and the panmen, who were associated with lawlessness and violence, helped to popularize steel pan music among soldiers, which began its international popularization.

J'ouvert

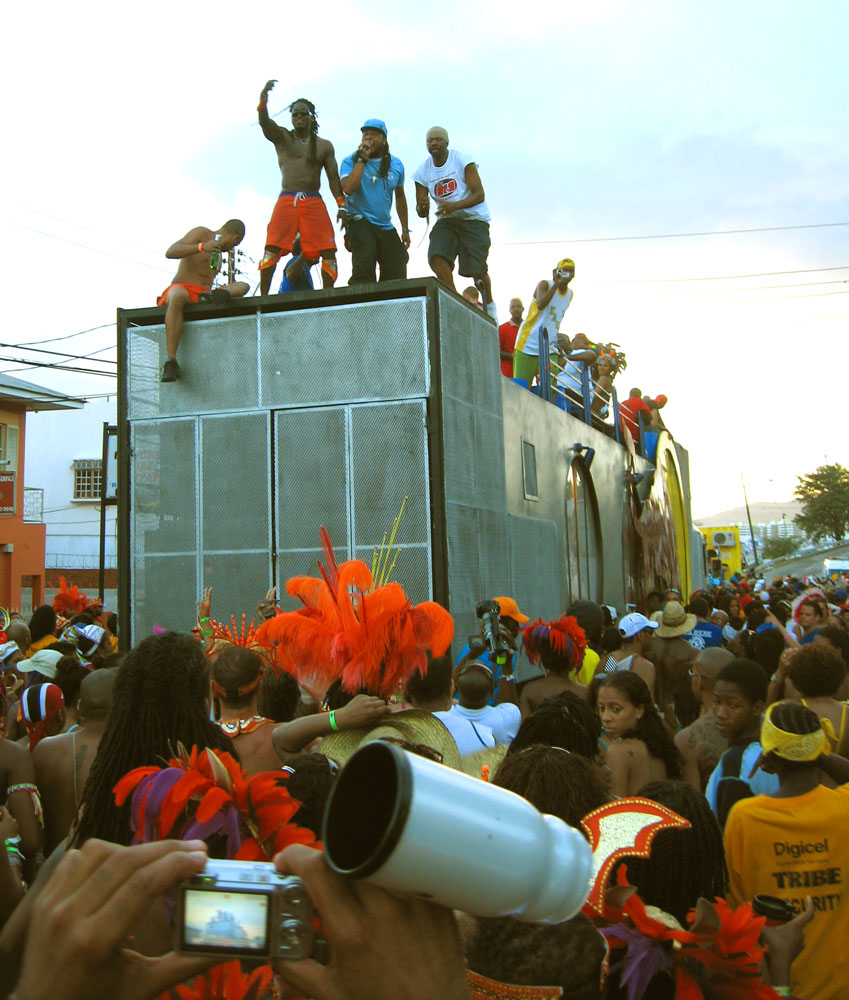
A Music Truck entertains the crowd on the streets. Trucks are an integral part of the street parade, featuring live performances or deejays

J'ouvert (translated from French as "break of day") symbolizes the start of the official two days of Carnival. Beginning early Monday, revelers parade through town in the tradition of the Canboulay celebrations. "Jouvay" (as it is commonly pronounced and spelled) features a variety of homemade or satirical costumes. The celebration involves participants dousing themselves in oil, mud, and powder, and dancing to calypso and soca music through the streets. This is a stark contrast to the attractive and more formal costumes that are donned later in the day on Carnival Monday and on Tuesday.

== Carnival dates ==
The table shows a list of Trinidad and Tobago Carnival dates from 2009 to 2026.

Calendar Year	Carnival Monday	Carnival Tuesday
2009	February 23	February 24
2010	February 15	February 16
2011	March 7	March 8
2012	February 20	February 21
2013	February 11	February 12
2014	March 3	March 4
2015	February 16	February 17
2016	February 8	February 9
2017	February 27	February 28
2018	February 12	February 13
2019	March 4	March 5
2020	February 24	February 25
2021	Cancelled due to COVID-19	
2022	Cancelled due to COVID-19	
2023	February 20	February 21
2024	February 12	February 13
2025	March 3	March 4
2026	February 16	February 17

== Characters ==
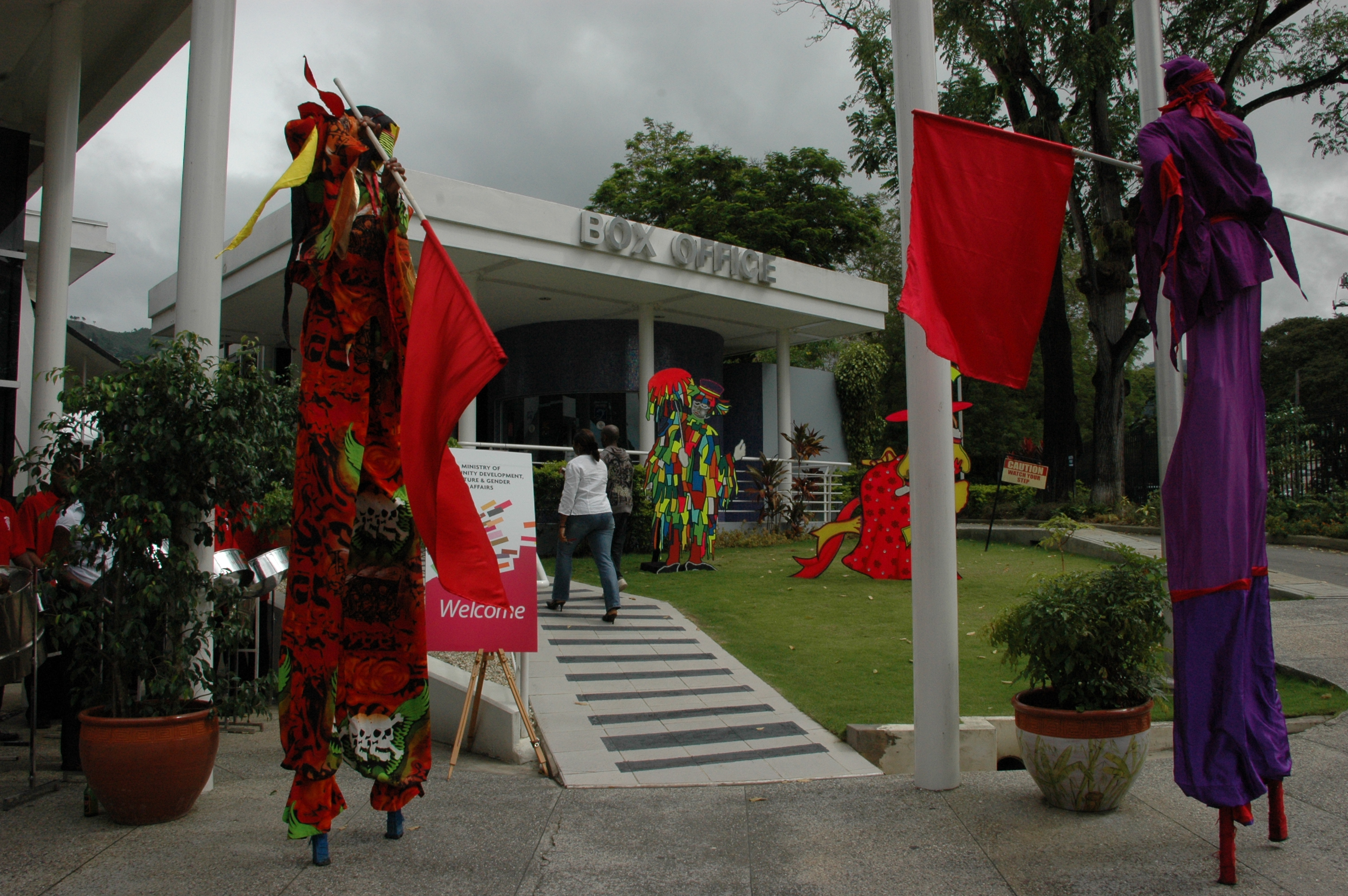
Moko jumbie characters

A few specific characters have evolved during the history of Trinidad and Tobago's Carnival. Among these characters are:

- Burrokeet – A donkey-riding character, from burroquito (Spanish for 'little donkey'). The costume is constructed so as to give the illusion of a dancer riding a small burro or donkey. This masquerade was brought to Trinidad by Venezuelan settlers.
- Dame Lorraine – A voluptuous woman. The costume parodies the dress of 18th-century French aristocratic women and is stuffed in the hips and bust. Often performed by men.
- Jab Jab – A devil character, from the French Patois diable (meaning 'devil). There are Jab Jabs of different colors, including the "Jab Molassi" (molasses devil) cover their bodies in oil from head to toe.
- Midnight Robber – A storytelling character who brags about himself and his valor. The character and costume is influenced by West African dress and storytelling as well as the American Wild West. The character wears an oversized hat, which comes in different shapes and colors.
- Minstrels – A group of singers, often with instruments. The singers would sometimes dress in whiteface, parodying the white American minstrels who dressed in blackface.
- Moko jumbie – A stilt dancer. The character is of African origin. Originally the character wore a hat made of dried wild cucumbers, and the stilts were striped.
- Pierrot Grenade – A jester pretending to be a scholar. The character is a parody of the Pierrot character, which was a character from the Carnival balls held by the French planter class in late 18th century Trinidad. The Pierrot character was a well-dressed scholar who boasted about his knowledge. The Pierrot Grenade's costume is made of scraps of cloth pieced together.
