= Dennice Gayme =

Mechanical engineer

Dennice Fanny Maynard Gayme is mechanical engineer whose research combines control theory and fluid dynamics in boundary layer control and its applications including ship resistance and propulsion and the design of wind farms. Educated in Canada and the US, she works in the US as a professor and Carol Croft Linde Faculty Scholar in the Johns Hopkins University Department of Mechanical Engineering.

== Education and career ==
Gayme graduated in 1992 from the Trafalgar Castle School in Ontario, listing her home address at the time as in Phoenix, Arizona. She studied mechanical engineering and society as an undergraduate at McMaster University in Ontario, a program focusing on sustainable applications of engineering; she earned a bachelor's degree there in 1997. She cites Mohamed Elbestawi as a McMaster faculty mentor.

After earning a master's degree at the University of California, Berkeley in 1998, she worked as a research scientist in Minneapolis for Honeywell before returning to doctoral study at the California Institute of Technology (Caltech), where she completed a doctorate in 2010. Her doctoral dissertation, A robust control approach to understanding nonlinear mechanisms in shear flow turbulence, was jointly supervised by John Doyle and Beverley McKeon.

After postdoctoral study at Caltech, she took her present faculty position at Johns Hopkins in 2012. She was named as the Carol Linde Croft Faculty Scholar in 2016.

== Recognition ==
Gayme was the 2022 recipient of the Nobuhide Kasagi Award of the International Symposia on Turbulence and Shear Flow Phenomena (TSFP), "for deep insights in developing reduced models for wall bounded, turbulent dynamic processes". She won a National Science Foundation CAREER Award in 2015, and an Office of Naval Research Young Investigator Award in 2017.

She was named as a Fellow of the American Physical Society (APS) in 2023, after a nomination from the APS Division of Fluid Dynamics, "for the development of reduced order models of wall-bounded turbulent flows and their use in elucidating dominant flow dynamics and processes".

== Personal life ==
Gayme married Christophe Maynard, a grandson of Bahamian politician Clement T. Maynard and women's rights activist Zoë Maynard.
