= Mary Ingraham =

Bahamian suffragist (1901–1982)

- Bahamas postage stamp, issued October 10, 2012
- Born: Mary Naomi Mason; June 30, 1901; Nassau, Bahamas
- Died: March 26, 1982 (aged 80); Nassau, Bahamas
- Occupation: Suffragist
- Spouse: Rufus Harcourt Ingraham

Mary "May" Ingraham (1901 – 26 March 1982) was a Bahamian suffragist and the founding president of the Bahamas Women's Suffrage Movement.

== Personal life ==
Mary Ingraham was born in the St. Agnes district of Nassau, Bahamas to Ellis H. Mason and his wife Alice Leanora (née Bartlett) Mason. Three of her brothers became musicians in the United States:

- Norman Mason (1895–1971), a Dixieland clarinetist, multi-instrumentalist, bandleader;
- Oliver Welock Mason, a trumpeter who, in the 1930s and 1940s, performed with the orchestra for traveling ministrel shows; and
- Henry Morris Mason, a trumpeter who recorded as a sideman for Fannie May Goosby, Cleo Gibson, Blanche Calloway, Leon Abbey, Willie Lewis, Eddie Brunner, and Gene Sedric.

On 30 December 1919, Mary married Rufus Harcourt Ingraham in Grant's Town, one of the over-the-hill suburbs of Nassau.

== Suffragist ==
Along with Georgianna Symonette, Eugenia Lockhart and Mabel Walker, Ingraham founded the Women's Suffrage Movement (WSM).

In 1962, women gained the right to vote and serve in elected office in the legislature. By 1967, black women had organised themselves into a strong voting block that contributed to the Progressive Liberal Party's general election win and majority rule in the Bahamas.

Ingraham was also a daughter ruler of the Improved Benevolent and Protective Order of Elks of the World and a matron of the Prince Hall Order of the Eastern Star.

== Legacy and recognition ==
Nassau's Mary Ingraham Intergenerational Care Centre in Nassau was Ingraham. The centre is operated for the government by the South Bahamas Conference of the Inter-American Division of Seventh-day Adventists.

On 10 October 2012, the Post Office, issued six commemorative stamps, titled 50th Anniversary of Women Suffrage, one each bearing the portrait of a notable woman who influenced women's suffrage in the Bahamas in the following denominations:

1. Mary Ingraham – 15¢
2. Georgianna Symonette (1902–1965) – 25¢
3. Mabel Walker (1902–1987) – 50¢
4. Eugenia Lockhart (1908– ??) – 65¢
5. Dame Alberta Isaacs – 70¢
6. Dame Doris Johnson (1921–1983) – 80¢

== Bibliography ==
- Abbott, Lynn (born 1946); Seroff, Doug (2007). Ragged but Right : Black Traveling Shows, 'Coon Songs', and the Dark Pathway to Blues and Jazz. American Made Music Series (1st ed.). Jackson: University Press of Mississippi. p. 382 – via Google Books. OCLC 793384482. LCCN 2006-15009. ISBN 978-1-6170-3645-3, 1-6170-3645-5, 978-1-6047-3148-4; and ISBN 1-6047-3148-6
- "Charles Collier and the Silas Green Company ...". Pittsburgh Courier (newspaper advertisement). Vol. 31, no. 52. December 28, 1940. p. 22 – via Newspapers.com.
- Hinsey, Shananda M. "Women Suffrage: Suffrage Women". LibGuides (Libraries' Research Guides). Nassau: University of the Bahamas. Archived from the original on March 25, 2017.
- "Honouring the Heroes of Suffrage". The Tribune (newspaper). Nassau, Bahamas. October 9, 2012.
- Lord, Tom (ed.). "Henry Mason". Jazz Discography, The (online ed.). Chilliwack, British Columbia, Canada: Lord Music Reference Inc. OCLC 690104143. Retrieved January 22, 2021 (subscription required; accessible at many libraries)
- 1940 United States Census (May 20, 1940). "Mason, Oliver W.". Age: abt. 40 → place of birth: Bahamas → residence: Georgia → Chatham County → Savannah, Tract 7 → 25–8 Militia Districts 13–17 → Enumeration district 25-8 → sheet 24-B → household ID 11 → online image-page no. 48 (of 56) → line 69. Records of the U.S. Census Bureau, record group 29. Washington, D.C.: National Archives and Records Administration – via FamilySearch. NARA publication no. T627; digital folder no. 5460974; microfilm image no. 310.
- Williams-Pulfer, Kim (June 2016). "When Bain Town Woman Catch a Fire, Even the Devil Run". Voluntas: International Journal of Voluntary and Nonprofit Organizations. 27 (3). Springer Science+Business Media: 1472–1493. doi:10.1007/s11266-015-9630-y. ISSN 1573-7888. JSTOR 43923239. OCLC 1186439078 (all editions) (Note: William-Pulfer, in 2018, completed her PhD at Indiana University–Purdue University Indianapolis).
