= Mabel Walker (suffragist) =

American-Bahamian suffragist (1902–1987)

- Born: Mabel Cordelia Holloway; May 2, 1902; Greenville, South Carolina, United States
- Died: July 8, 1987 (aged 85)
- Education: Howard University
- Occupations: Educator and suffragist
- Known for: Founding president of the Bahamas Union of Teachers
- Spouse: Claudius Roland Walker
- Children: 7

Mabel Cordelia Holloway Walker (May 2, 1902 – July 8, 1987), an American-Bahamian suffragist, was the founding president of the Bahamas Union of Teachers and the first woman to head a trade union in The Bahamas. Walker along with Mary Ingraham, Georgianna Symonette, and Eugenia Lockhart started the Women's Suffrage Movement that campaigned for universal adult suffrage. In 2012, on the fiftieth anniversary of women gaining the right to vote, the Bahamian government created a series of postage stamps to honor these women. Walker appeared on a 50-cent stamp.

== Early life and education ==
Mabel Cordelia Holloway was born in Greenville, South Carolina, United States, on May 2, 1902, to Reverend Elias B. Holloway. She was the sixth of nine children.

As a child, Holloway attended elementary school in Greenville and then Oberlin High School in Oberlin, Ohio.

She attended Howard University in Washington, D.C., where she earned a Bachelor of Arts degree. While at Howard, she met her future husband, Claudius Roland Walker, who was studying for a Bachelor of Science degree. Claudius Walker was born in the Bain Town neighborhood of Nassau on May 6, 1897, to Claudius F. and Patience (Robinson) Walker.

While in college, she was active in the Young Women's Christian Association (YWCA) movement, attending many conferences of the YWCA.

After graduating from college and marrying, Walker worked at a YWCA in New Jersey, while her husband pursued his medical studies at Meharry College in Nashville, Tennessee. She pursued private studies in Arts and Crafts and painting. The couple relocated to The Bahamas after Claudius completed his medical studies.

== Career in education ==
After moving to The Bahamas, Walker became involved in education, first by opening a pre-school and assisting Claudius with adult education classes at The Bahamas Technical Institute.

Later, Walker became a teacher with local school system and taught at Southern Preparatory School, Western Senior and Junior schools. She was promoted to Headmistress of Woodcock Primary School. She retired from teaching in 1962.

== Bahamas Union of Teachers ==
The Bahamas Union of Teachers was founded in 1947 by Mabel Walker. Walker was the founding president, making her the first women to be the president of a trade union in The Bahamas.

== Women's Suffrage Movement ==
In 1950, Walker along with Mary Ingraham, Georgianna Symonette, and Eugenia Lockhart started the Women's Suffrage Movement (WSM) that campaigned for universal adult suffrage. With Walker's connections in the Bahamas Teachers' Union, and the other women's connections in women's clubs, they were able to influence others to join them.

== Later life and death ==
Walker was the mother to seven children. After she retired from teaching, she ran the Walker's Pharmacy, Clothes and Hardware Store.

The Mabel Walker Primary School, Mabel Walker In-House Professional Development Centre and The Bahamas Union of Teachers' Walker Hall were named to honor Walker. She received The Queen's Medal and Certificate of Honour. Walker died on July 8, 1987, at the age of 85.

In 2023, Walker was posthumously awarded the Order of Distinction – Companion honor fromby The Bahamian government.
