= Minnie T. Wright =

Minnie T. Wright may refer to:

- Minnie T. Wright (c. 1874–c. 1929), American composer and pianist
- Minnie T. Wright (fl. 1920s–1930s), African American clubwoman
