= Christian Holder =

British-Trinidadian artist, dancer and choreographer (1949–2025)

- Born: Arthur Christian Holder; 18 June 1949; Port of Spain, Trinidad and Tobago, British West Indies
- Died: 18 February 2025 (aged 75); London, England
- Education: Corona Academy Stage School; High School of Performing Arts
- Occupations: Dancer, choreographer, actor, teacher, costume designer, writer, painter, singer
- Parents: Boscoe Holder (father); Sheila Clarke Holder (mother)
- Family: Geoffrey Holder (uncle); Kathleen Davis (maternal grandmother); Meta Davis Cumberbatch (greataunt)

Arthur Christian Holder (18 June 1949 – 18 February 2025) was a British-Trinidadian dancer. He was renowned for being "one of the most iconic dancers of the Joffrey company in the 1970s, perhaps in its history." Holder's artistic endeavors were as diverse. He was also a choreographer, cabaret singer, painter, theater director, and playwright.

== Life and career ==
=== Early years and education ===
Arthur Christian Holder was born in Port of Spain, Trinidad, on 18 June 1949, into an artistic family, the son of Boscoe Holder and his wife Sheila Clarke Holder, who were both professional dancers. His maternal grandmother was the actress and radio personality Kathleen Davis – known as "Aunty Kay" – and his uncle was the actor Geoffrey Holder.

His family moved to London when he was an infant. His father, who later became a renowned painter, at the time ran a company called Boscoe Holder and his Caribbean Dancers, and throughout childhood Christian appeared with them, and on British television and in repertory theatre. As a four-year-old, Christian danced with his father's company at the coronation of Queen Elizabeth II in 1953, and by the age of seven he had begun training in ballet, and aged 11 attended the Corona Academy Stage School. In an unfinished 1955 production of Moby Dick, directed by Orson Welles, Holder had the role of Pip the Cabin Boy.

=== Move to New York ===
In 1963, Holder was one of a select group of young dancers to be offered scholarships by Martha Graham to study at her school in New York City, so as to return to London "to be charter members of what was to become London Contemporary Dance Theatre". The following year, his parents saw him off to the United States.

He went on to enrol as a student at the High School of Performing Arts in New York City, where he was spotted by Robert Joffrey. Joining the Joffrey Ballet, Holder remained with the company from 1966 to 1979, becoming one of their most acclaimed principal dancers, performing as a soloist with choreographers including Kurt Jooss (who personally trained Holder for the lead role of "Death" in a revival of his 1932 anti-war ballet, The Green Table), Leonid Massine, Jerome Robbins, Alvin Ailey, and Agnes De Mille. A New York Magazine review in 1971 typically commented: "...Christian Holder, lithe, tremendously powerful and totally individual, dominates the stage whenever he is given solo work to do.... Up the Joffrey! Onward, Christian Holder!" Measuring in height 6 feet and 4 inches, he was "majestic and pantherlike" onstage, as described by choreographer Margo Sappington.

In 1973, Holder attended an Ike & Tina Turner concert at New York's Philharmonic Hall in Lincoln Center and anonymously left a dress he had made for Tina Turner in her dressing room. Turner was wearing his dress when he went to her show in 1974. Holder wrote to Turner, who replied by inviting him to her recording studio complex, Bolic Sound, in Inglewood, and requesting him to design additional outfits. They became friends and Holder created stage costumes for her until 1984. He also designed costumes for Ann Reinking, Peter Allen, and Bette Midler.

From 1979 to 1981, he appeared as a guest solo dancer with San Francisco Opera, dancing in productions starring Luciano Pavarotti, and Placido Domingo, and choreographed their productions of The Merry Widow with Dame Joan Sutherland and Aida (2001).

In 2006, he performed in the Joffrey Ballet's production of Sir Frederick Ashton's Cinderella, as one of the ugly stepsisters along with Gary Chryst, which roles Joffrey (who died in 1988) had always wanted them to play.

The 2012 documentary film Joffrey: Mavericks of American Dance, written and directed by Bob Hercules, contains archive footage of Holder.

During his career, Holder choreographed ballets including Weren't We Fools? for American Ballet Theatre and Transcendence for Atlanta Ballet, appeared in repertory theatre productions and musicals, and designed costumes for ballets including Margo Sappington's Toulouse-Lautrec (2000) for the Ballet du Capitole in Toulouse, France. In addition, Holder taught ballet at Steps on Broadway in New York City, the Metropolitan Opera Ballet, Kaatsbaan International Dance Center, PeriDance, and for Cedar Lake Dance.

=== Return to London and later years ===
In 2009, Holder returned to live in England, where he was involved in various creative work. In 2010, his paintings and designs were exhibited in London alongside the work of his father Boscoe Holder and that of master designer Oliver Messel, a family friend.

A later project was writing the book and lyrics for a theatre piece called Verse of Fortune (in collaboration with Noa Ain) inspired by the life and work of French poet Baudelaire.

In April 2015, Holder made his debut as a singer in his one-man cabaret entitled "At Home and Abroad", with music direction by Philip Foster, playing a sold-out show at The Crazy Coqs in London's Piccadilly, where Holder performed his own compositions as well as songs by Cole Porter, Noël Coward, Stephen Sondheim, Peter Allen and Rodgers & Hart. A subsequent show in May 2016 at the same venue was entitled SUITE 60 and received a four-star review from BritishTheatre.com, where Douglas Mayo commented: "Holder succeeds in weaving a spell over his audience. It's a blend of live performance and multi-media, that is perfectly placed in the intimacy of a venue like Crazy Coqs....his ability to deliver truth and drama through song enables him to captivate an audience for nearly two hours and leave them wanting more."

In August 2016, Holder appeared at the Victoria & Albert Museum in conversation with Greta Chaffer, in a special event entitled "Christian Holder: A life in performance, New York and London".

The 2020 exhibition Père et Fils, featured recent work by Holder alongside previously unseen pieces by his father, hosted by Campbell's of London in South Kensington.

Holder wrote and directed the play Ida Rubinstein: The Final Act, which was staged in 2021 at the Playground Theatre, with ballerina Naomi Sorkin performing the title role.

In 2024, Holder published a limited edition fine art book about his father, entitled Boscoe Holder: Travels in Rhythm, A Life of Art and Dance.

Holder died unexpectedly at his home in London on 18 February 2025, aged 75, having the previous week announced plans for a show called Christian Holder: Songs and Stories that was to be held in New York in April 2025.

== Awards ==
On 7 April 1991, Christian Holder, Boscoe Holder, and Geoffrey Holder jointly received, in Philadelphia, the first Drexel University Award for International Excellence. Also, an award for Outstanding Contribution to the Arts was given to him by Philadanco in 1995.
