= West Point Cemetery (Norfolk, Virginia) =

Historic cemetery in Virginia, United States

- U.S. National Register of Historic Places
- U.S. Historic district
- Virginia Landmarks Register
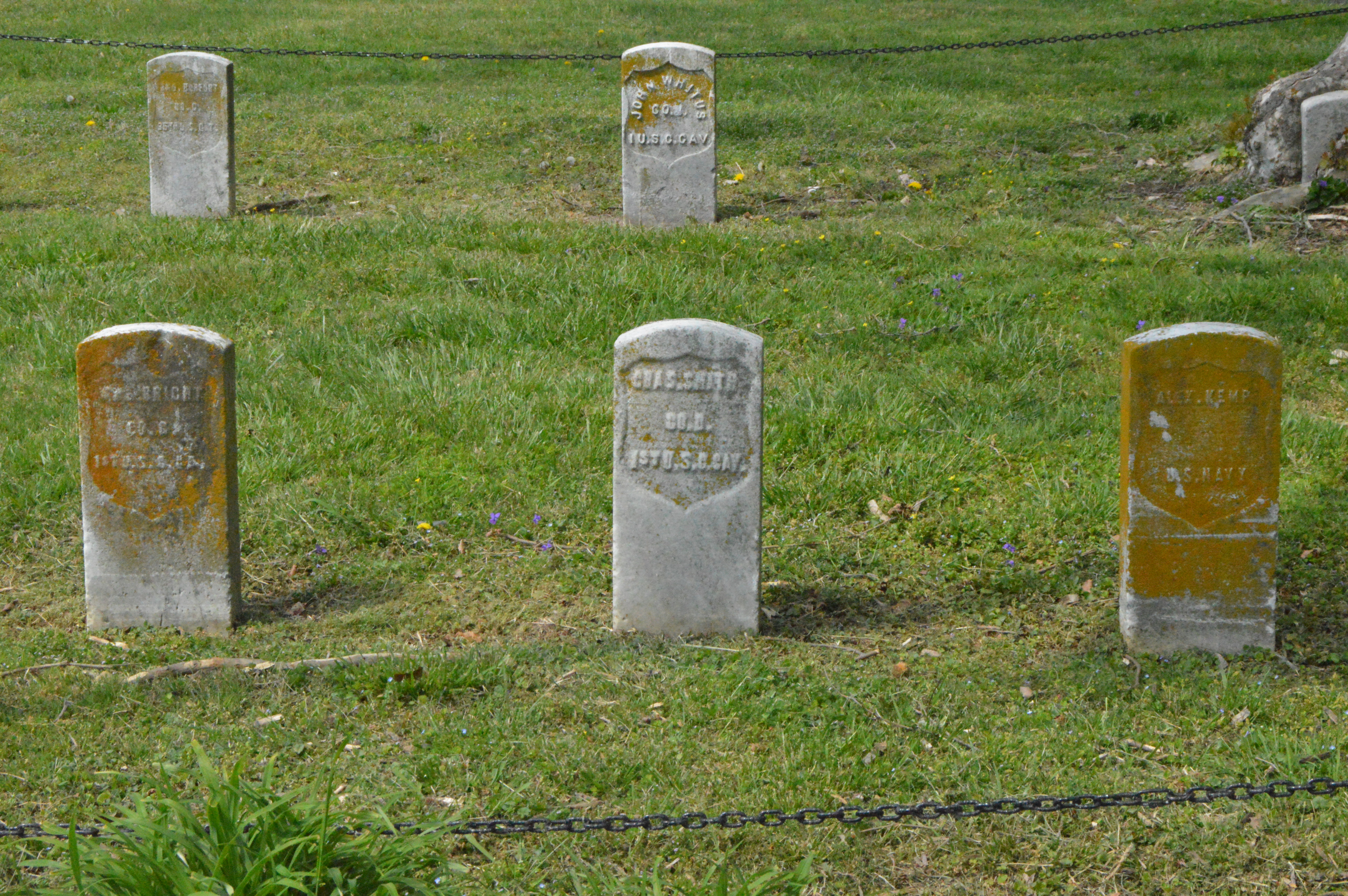
- Five United States Colored Troops graves

- Location within Virginia Location within the United States
- Location: 238 E. Princess Anne Rd., Norfolk, Virginia
- Coordinates: 36°51′36″N 76°17′03″W
- Area: 14 acres (5.7 ha)
- Built: 1873
- Architect: O'Rourke
- Architectural style: Cemetery
- NRHP reference No.: 07000393
- VLR No.: 122-5181

Significant dates
- Added to NRHP: May 3, 2007
- Designated VLR: March 7, 2007

West Point Cemetery, also known as Potter's Field and Calvary Cemetery, is a historic cemetery and national historic district located at Norfolk, Virginia. It encompasses three contributing sites, one contributing structure, and one contributing object in an African American graveyard in downtown Norfolk. The cemetery was established in 1873, and includes a grouping of headstones marking the remains of 58 black soldiers and sailors who served in the American Civil War, and a monument honoring these veterans stands over their graves. Other notable elements include the Potter's Field, O’Rourke Mausoleum, and the West Point Cemetery entry sign.

It was listed on the National Register of Historic Places in 2007. It is contiguous with Elmwood Cemetery, listed in 2013.

== West Point Monument ==
Dedicated in 1906, the monument was built as a tribute to African American veterans of both the Civil War and Spanish–American War. The Civil War soldier depicted on the top of the West Point Monument is Norfolk native Sergeant William H. Carney of the 54th Massachusetts Volunteer Regiment.

James Fuller (1846–1909) was the primary force behind the monument's installation. Fuller was a former slave and a Civil War Veteran quartermaster in the First United States Colored Cavalry, and was later elected as the first black Norfolk City Councilman.

== Notable burials ==
- Emma V. Kelley (1867–1932), founder of the Daughters of the Improved Benevolent and Protective Order of Elks of the World
