= Grace Snively =

Community worker in Maryland

- Born: July 29, 1913; Hedgesville, West Virginia
- Died: August 6, 2014 (aged 101); Hagerstown, Maryland
- Occupations: Community worker, activist
- Spouse: Russel (m. 1943)
- Honours: Maryland Women's Hall of Fame

Grace Snively (née Mason; July 29, 1913 – August 9, 2014) was a community activist in the state of Maryland. Since the 1950s, she campaigned to improve gynaecological health with a focus on early cancer detection in segregated areas. She also promoted civil rights and voter registration and was involved in various charitable organisations. Having served as a chief election judge in Washington County, Maryland, she was inducted into the Maryland Women's Hall of Fame in 2006.

== Life ==
Grace Mason was born on July 29, 1913, in Hedgesville, West Virginia, to parents Marshall and Naomi Mason. Snively says she inherited her desire to help the community from her mother, who would assist those who were sick or in need of help in the Hedgesville community. On May 1, 1943, she married Russell Snively at an Episcopal church in Hancock, Maryland. The couple then moved to Hagerstown, where she worked as an office and house worker for Jack Beachley. Snively died on August 6, 2014, in Hagerstown, aged 101.

== Activism ==
Snively was known for her service to her community. In the 1950s, she worked with the American Cancer Society as a volunteer medical educator in the segregated sections of Hagerstown to bring information and home pap smear kits to residents. Known as "the cancer woman", her work to promote early cancer detection altered the community's perception of gynecological health, and saved women's lives. Additionally, Snively worked with March of Dimes and the local health department to administer the polio vaccine to people in the community.

In addition to her involvement in community health, Snively promoted civil rights and voter registration in western Maryland, and was involved with the League of Women Voters. She served as an election judge in Washington County for 30 years, and was eventually appointed to the position of chief judge. Snively also took part in a volunteer committee at the Maryland Correctional Institution that worked with the inmate population to develop programs that would help them successfully return to society. Other service-focused organizations that Snively volunteered with include: The Salvation Army, the American Red Cross, United Way, and Hagerstown Day Nursery. Snively was also highly involved with her church, serving many different roles during her 71-year membership of Ebenezer AME church, including missionary, trustee, steward, and delegate to the general conference.

Snively has received several honors and recognition for her service to her community. In 1993, she received a community service award from the Washington County branch of the NAACP for her civil rights activism. She received the Governor's Volunteer Award in 1999. Snively was inducted into the Maryland Women's Hall of Fame in 2006. Written recognitions were delivered to her 100th birthday celebration in 2013 from Maryland Governor Martin O'Malley, and from Barack Obama & Michelle Obama.

Snively was also affiliated with the Daughters of the Elks. She joined the organization in 1945. Over the years, Snively served a variety of roles as a member of Sharon Temple 160. These roles include chaperone to debutante balls, delegate to the Tri-State Association Convention, and state president
