= Zoë Maynard =

Bahamian women's rights advocate (1926–2018)

Lady Zoë Maynard

Personal details
- Born: Zoë Ruth Davis Cumberbatch; 1926
- Died: 10 December 2018 (aged 92) Nassau, Bahamas
- Party: Progressive Liberal Party
- Spouse: Sir Clement T. Maynard (m. 1947)
- Children: 5, including Allyson Maynard Gibson
- Parent: Meta Davis Cumberbatch (mother)
- Relatives: Kathleen Davis (aunt)

Zoë Ruth Davis, Lady Maynard (née Cumberbatch; 1926 – 10 December 2018) was an important figure in the Bahamas known for advancing women's rights.

== Early life ==
In 1926 her parents, surgeon Roland Cumberbatch and musician Meta Davis Cumberbatch, moved from Trinidad to the Bahamas when her father accepted a post from the Colonial Medical Service. She was born Zoë Ruth Davis Cumberbatch the same year.

== Military service ==
During World War II Maynard, still a teenager, enlisted as a private in the Auxiliary Territorial Service and was stationed in Jamaica. She had numerous duties, including communications. At the time of her death in 2018 she was reported to have been the last living female veteran from the Bahamas.

== Career and family ==
On 17 January 1947, a little more than a year after the end of the war, she married Clement T. Maynard, the son of a builder and a suffragist. Trained as a medical technologist, he would go on to become a politician and eventually deputy prime minister. Maynard and her husband had five children: Julian (died 1995), Peter, Allyson, David and Clement III. (Her husband also had one daughter from a previous relationship.) Their daughter Allyson would go on to become the country's attorney general.

For some time, Maynard worked for the British Overseas Airways Corporation. Arthur Foulkes recalled that she and her husband used the travel opportunities afforded by her career to purchase books for their comrades in the progressive movement. (Books by radical West Indian authors such as C. L. R. James, Frantz Fanon and George Padmore were not easily accessible in the colony.) She also served as secretary general of the Airport, Airline and Allied Workers Union.

A supporter of the progressive movement and women's rights, she worked closely with her mother-in-law, Georgianna Kathleen Symonette, during the suffrage movement. In January 1968, a year after her husband was first elected to the senate, Maynard became the first woman to register for jury duty in the Bahamas. She also served as secretary for the Women's Branch of the Progressive Liberal Party.

In 1989, Clement Maynard was appointed a Knight Bachelor and Mrs. Maynard became Lady Zoë Maynard.

== Later life ==
After her husband's death in 2009, Maynard began studying pottery and painting. Her works were exhibited in group shows such as "The F Factor: Female Artists of The Bahamas".

Maynard died on 10 December 2018 at the age of 92. In a tribute, opposition leader Philip Davis called her "a freedom fighter, particularly for women’s rights and in the arts."
