= Norman Mason (American musician) =

American jazz musician

Norman Kellogg Mason (born 25 November 1895 – 6 July 1971 St. Louis) was a Bahamian-born American jazz clarinetist, multi-instrumentalist, and bandleader.

== Early life and career ==
Mason was born in Nassau, Bahamas, to Ellis and Alice Leanora (née Bartlett) Mason.

He began playing trumpet at age eight, as did his brother, Henry Mason.

He immigrated to the United States in 1913, initially living in Miami. He toured with revues such as the Rabbit Foot Minstrel Show while still in his teens, and soon after became active on the New Orleans jazz scene. Soon after he played in bands in Chicago and St. Louis.

== Career ==
At the end of the 1910s, Mason was playing with Fate Marable, when he began playing alto saxophone.

Toward the beginning of the next decade, Mason was a member of Ed Allen's Whispering Gold Band, and soon after led his own ensemble, the Carolina Melodists (though they had no actual connection to North or South Carolina). For one year, he and the Melodists played on radio stations WIL and KMOX in St. Louis.

From 1927 to 1933 Mason returned to duty under Marable, and after leaving his employ Mason began playing clarinet in Chicago and St. Louis bands.

In the mid-1950s, Mason headed the Dixie Stompers band in St. Louis. (Note: The Dixie Stompers, on their 1956 debut album with Delmar (DL 504), was a Dixieland sextet composed of Bill Mason (cornet); Jim "Kid" Haislip (trombone); Norman Mason (clarinet); Glenn Tintera (né Glenn Joel Tintera; 1931–2013) (piano); Pete Patterson (né Joseph Patterson; 1895–1974) (banjo); and Bob Kornacher (né Robert Henry Kornacher; 1931–2013) (drums).) The group's April 6, 1957, performance at Westminster College's annual jazz concert was recorded by Blue Note Records and released as Jazz st Westminster College on a 12-inch LP by Delmar Records (Note: Delmar Records, founded 1953 in Chicago by Bob Koester, was renamed Delmark around 1958. (Barnes, Harper. May 28, 1993. "A Man, A Life, A Label". St. Louis Post-Dispatch. Vol. 115, no. 148. p. 4E. Retrieved January 21, 2021 – via Newspapers.com).) (catalog no. DL-201; matrix runout nos.: DL-201-A & DL-201-B). Bob Koester, founder of Delmar, wrote the liner notes.

Mason was a clarinetist with Singleton Palmer's Dixieland Six, (Note: Singleton Palmer's Dixieland Six was composed of Bill Martin (trumpet), Leon King (né Leon Bruce King; 1907–1996) (trombone); Norman Mason (clarinet); Gus Perryman (né Thomas Augustus Perryman; 1901–1993) (piano); Palmer (tuba and bass); and Lije (aka Lige) Shaw (de) (né Elijah William Shaw; 1900–1982) (drums).) which, after two years as the regular band at the Opera House in Gaslight Square, recorded a live session there in 1961. It was released as Dixie by Gaslight on an LP by Norman Records (NL 101), a St. Louis-based jazz label founded a year earlier by Norman Wienstroer (né Norman Henry Wienstroer; 1916–1999). The album was Palmer's first recording as a leader.

Mason lived in St. Louis for the next several decades, playing often with Singleton Palmer but his career ended in 1969 after a stroke.

== Personal life ==
One of Mason's sisters, Mary 'May' Ingraham was a co-founder and the first president of the Bahamian Women's Suffrage Movement. In 2012, she was featured on one of six postage stamps issued by the Bahamas Post Office on the 50th Anniversary of the Granting of Universal Suffrage to Women in the Bahamas.

== Bibliography ==
=== References ===
- Chilton, John (1972) [1970]. "Mason, Norman". Who's Who of Jazz: Storyville to Swing Street (1st American ed.). Philadelphia: Chilton Book Company. p. 235. ISBN 0-8019-5705-2. LCCN 72-188159. OCLC 33999819.
- Claghorn, Charles Eugene (1982). Biographical Dictionary of Jazz. Englewood Cliffs, New Jersey: Prentice Hall. p. 196. ISBN 9780130779663 – via Internet Archive. ISBN 0-13-077966-0. LCCN 82-10409. OCLC 769095671.
- Crowder, Ed; Niemoeller, Adolph Frederick (February 1952). "Norman Mason: Riverboat Jazzman". The Record Changer. Changer Publications, Inc.: 8 & 19 – via Internet Archive.
- Goddard, Bob (April 7, 1957). "In Our Town". St. Louis Globe-Democrat (newspaper column). Vol. 82, no. 300. p. 12 G – via Newspapers.com.
- Kemp, Larry (2018). "Norman Kellog Mason (November 25, 1895 – )". Early Jazz Trumpet Legends. Series: Jazz Trumpet Legends. Vol. 1. Pittsburgh: Rose Dog Books (self publishing firm). pp. 23–24. ISBN 9781480976375 – via Google Books (this source provides bibliography for Mason's date and place of birth).
- Kenney, William Howland (2013) [2005]. Jazz on the River. University of Chicago Press. p. 76. ISBN 9780226437330 – via Google Books. (a 1919 photo on p. 76 shows Mason with the Marable band aboard the S.S. Capitol). ISBN 978-0-2261-0267-2, 0-2261-0267-X, 978-0-2264-3733-0, and 0-2264-3733-7. OCLC 872969648.
- Henderson, Alex. "The Dixie Stompers – Jazz at Westminster College". AllMusic (review).
- Hobson, Vic (2018). "Chapter 10: Going to the Conservatory". Creating the Jazz Solo: Louis Armstrong and Barbershop Harmony. Jackson: University Press of Mississippi ISBN 9781496819772 and 9781496819826. doi:10.14325/mississippi/9781496819772.003.0010 (chapter). OCLC 8260487645 (chapter). OCLC 1053996701, 1120119955 (e-book).

== General references ==
1. Norman Mason at Allmusic
