= Erma Henderson =

American politician

President of the Detroit City Council
- In office 1977–1989
- Preceded by: Carl Levin
- Succeeded by: Maryann Mahaffey

Member of the Detroit City Council from the at-large district
- In office 1972–1989
- Preceded by: Robert Tindal

Personal details
- Born: August 20, 1917 Pensacola, Florida, U.S.
- Died: December 14, 2009 (aged 92) Detroit, Michigan, U.S.
- Party: Democratic
- Other political affiliations: Republican (pre-1940s); Progressive (1940s)
- Spouse: George Henderson (m. 1935; div. 1941)
- Education: Wayne State University (MSW)

Erma Lois Henderson (née McQueen; August 20, 1917 – December 14, 2009) was an American politician and civil rights activist. She was the first African American woman elected to the Detroit City Council, and was the first African American elected president of the city council.

Henderson was a civil rights leader who fought for racial and gender equality. She founded a statewide coalition against redlining in 1975, which helped state legislation banning the practice pass in 1977.

== Early life and education ==
Erma Henderson was born on August 20, 1917, in Pensacola, Florida. Her mother, Rose McQueen, separated from her husband. Henderson would state in her memoir that she had no memories of her father. In 1918, Henderson and her family moved to Detroit, Michigan, as part of the Great Migration.

Henderson grew up in Black Bottom. She attended Eastern High School. She attended various colleges before earning a master's degree in social work from Wayne State University.

== Career ==
Henderson engaged with politics from an early age. At 17, she founded a women's auxiliary to a Republican Party club. In 1948, she was made a member of the Progressive Party National Committee, representing Michigan. Later, she would ally more with the Democratic Party.

In 1945, Henderson was campaign manager for Charles A. Hill's unsuccessful run for the Detroit City Council. She also served as the campaign manager for William Patrick in 1957. The successful campaign saw Patrick become the first African American member of the Detroit City Council in the 20th-century.

Following the 1967 Detroit riot, in 1968, the Equal Justice Council was founded. It was a watchdog organization, which collected data in regard to the treatment of defendants in the court system. Henderson was initially executive secretary of the organization, but shortly after was made executive director. The organization would release a report, showing evidence of discrimination in the judicial system. In 1969, Henderson made a strong, but ultimately unsuccessful run for the Detroit City Council.

In July 1971, councilman Robert Tindal died, creating a vacancy on the Detroit City Council. Henderson filed her candidacy for the resultant special election on March 23, 1972. Henderson got the most votes in the May 16 primary election. She and Jack Kelley were nominated to compete in the general election on November 7. Kelley was a conservative, white city official. Henderson saw endorsements from organizations such as the Detroit Free Press, The Detroit News, the Michigan Chronicle, the United Auto Workers, and the AFL-CIO, as well as five incumbent city council members. Henderson defeated Kelley in the general by 7,409 out of a total of 333,787 votes cast. She was sworn in on November 27. She was the first African American woman elected to the Detroit City Council.

Henderson saw re-election to the council in 1973, 1977, 1981, and 1985. In 1977, she was elected president of the Detroit City Council, succeeding Carl Levin. She was the first African American to serve as president of the city council. She served three terms as city council president over 12 years. She was succeeded as president by Maryann Mahaffey.

In 1973, Henderson founded the Women’s Conference of Concerns. It was an annual conference focused on political empowerment and community improvement. At its peak, the organization represented 250,000 women. As of 2009, the organization was still meeting regularly.

In 1975, Henderson founded the Michigan Statewide Coalition Against Redlining. Redlining was a particularly important target of Henderson's activism. The organization influenced state legislation. In 1977, the group collected 43,000 signatures on a petition urging a ban on redlining. The coalition presented these signatures to the Michigan Legislature, providing political pressure which helped a bill banning redlining pass. Governor William Milliken signed the bill into law on November 7, 1977.

In 1989, Henderson ran for mayor of Detroit. She was defeated in the primary election by incumbent Mayor Coleman Young, who was seeking his fifth term in office.

Henderson served as U.S. representative to the United Nations Special Session on Apartheid in 1975. In July 1982, Henderson held an international trade conference as head of the newly formed Michigan chapter of the Continental Africa Chamber of Commerce. The conference was attended by ambassadors and finance ministers from 23 African countries. She served as delegation leader to the United Nations Decade for Women Conference in Nairobi, Kenya in 1985. In 1986, Henderson attended the installation of Desmond Tutu as archbishop.

In 1990, Henderson was inducted into the Michigan Women's Hall of Fame. In 2004, she published a book titled Down Through The Years: The Memoirs of Detroit City Council President Emeritus Erma Henderson.

== Personal life ==
Erma married George Henderson on September 25, 1935, in her mother's home. The couple filed for divorce on August 10, 1940, and the divorce was finalized on February 19, 1941.

She had two children, a daughter and a son. By 1972, she had one grandchild. She was a member of the Divine Temple of Mental Science Church. She was a member of the Daughters of Elks.

== Later life, death, and legacy ==
Henderson lost her eyesight in the mid 1990s, though she remained active in public life. On December 14, 2009, Henderson died in Detroit Receiving Hospital of natural causes. She was cremated and interred in a public mausoleum in Elmwood Cemetery.

In Detroit, a school, park, marina, and the city hall's auditorium are named for Henderson.
