= Georgianna Kathleen Symonette =

Bahamian suffragist (1902–1965)

- Bahamian postage stamp 2012
- Born: 4 April 1902; Eleuthera, Bahamas
- Died: 14 May 1965 (aged 63)
- Occupation: Suffragist
- Children: Clement Maynard
- Relatives: Allyson Maynard Gibson (granddaughter)

Georgianna Kathleen Symonette (4 April 1902 – 14 May 1965) a Bahamian suffragist, was the founding chairwoman of the Women's Branch of the Progressive Liberal Party and founding member of the Women's Suffrage Movement. Her son Clement T. Maynard became Deputy Prime Minister of the Bahamas and her granddaughter, Attorney General and Minister for Legal Affairs.

== Early life and education ==
Georgianna Kathleen Symonette was born on 4 April 1902 in Wemyss Bight, Eleuthera, to Olivia Major and George Enoch Symonette. She attended the government school in Wemyss Bight.

== Career ==
After Symonette finished her schooling, she became an assistant teacher in Wemyss Bight. She relocated to Nassau to pursue nursing as a career at Bahamas General Hospital (now the Princess Margaret Hospital).

== Suffragist ==
Along with Mary Ingraham, Eugenia Lockhart and Mabel Walker, Symonette founded the Women's Suffrage Movement (WSM).

== Personal life ==
Symonette's son Clement Maynard II was the Deputy Prime Minister of the Bahamas from 1985 to 1992, and her granddaughter Allyson Maynard Gibson formerly held the position of Attorney General and Minister for Legal Affairs.

== Death and legacy ==
Symonette died aged 63 on 14 May 1965.

In 2012, the Bahamian government issued a series of postage stamps to honour the women who campaigned to gain universal adult suffrage. Symonette appeared on the 25 cent stamp.
