= Spiritual Israel Church and Its Army Temple =

- Amity Lodge No. 335 Temple – Spiritual Israel Church and Its Army Temple
- U.S. National Register of Historic Places
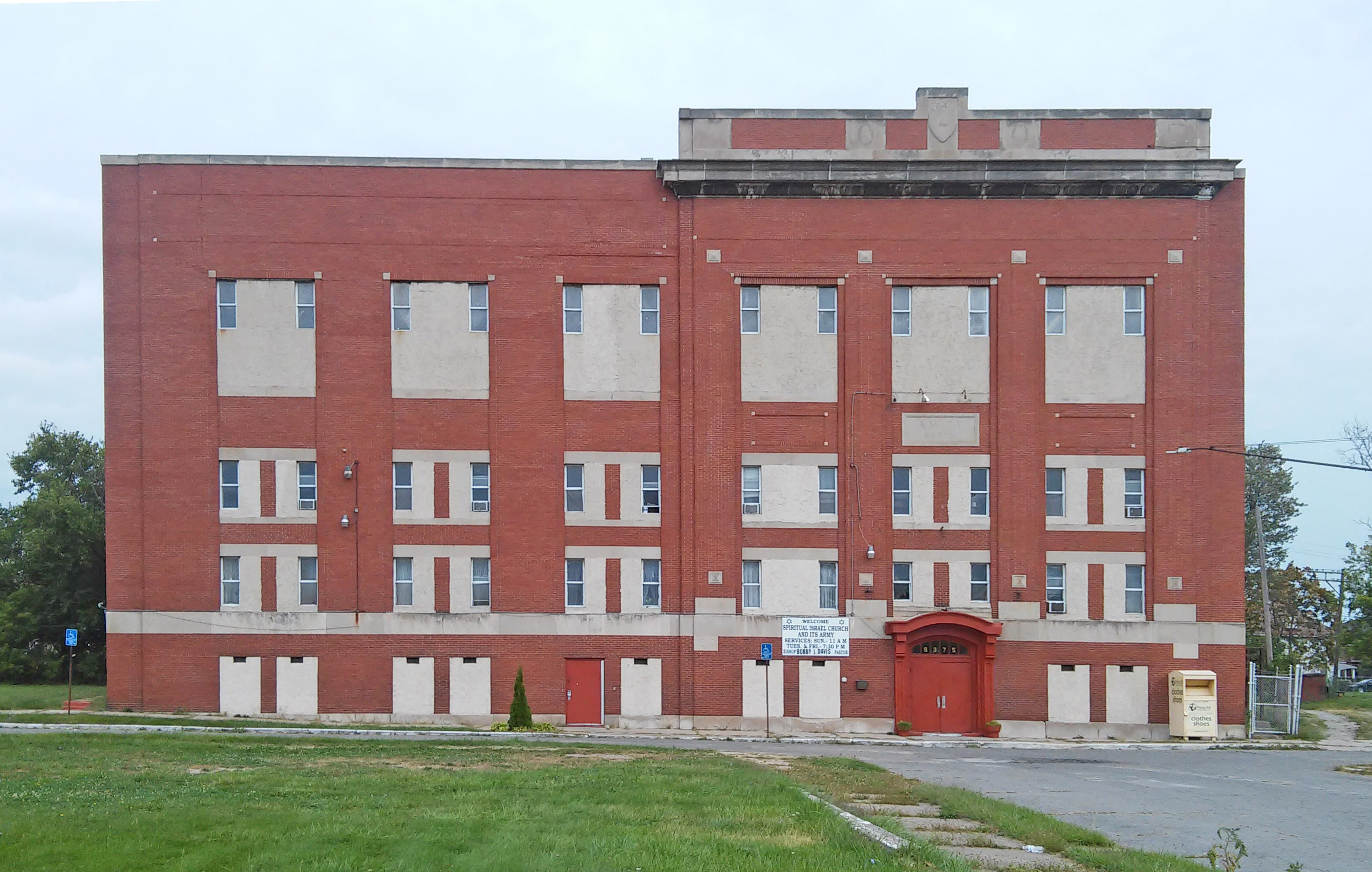
- Interactive map
- Location: 9375 Amity Street; Detroit, Michigan
- Coordinates: 42°21′52″N 82°59′13″W
- Built: 1911; 1920 (addition)
- Architectural style: Classical Revival
- NRHP reference No.: 14001011
- Added to NRHP: December 10, 2014

The Spiritual Israel Church and Its Army Temple, originally known as the Amity Lodge No. 335 Temple, is a historic building located at 9375 Amity Street in Detroit, Michigan, on the city's east side. It was listed on the National Register of Historic Places in 2014.

== History ==
The Amity Lodge No. 335 of the Independent Order of Odd Fellows was established in Detroit in 1880. The Lodge met on the east side near the corner of Chene and Croghan Streets, then moved to a location on East Jefferson near Belle Isle. In 1910, the Amity Lodge formed an association with the Island View Temple Odd Fellows Lodge for the purpose of building a permanent temple for the two organizations. The association purchased land in 1910, and in 1911 began construction of what is now the northeast (right-hand) section of the current building. In 1920, an addition was constructed to the building which expanded it to roughly twice the original size. The building was used concurrently by both the Amity and Island View lodges, as well as other Odd Fellows organizations.

By the late 1930s, the Amity Lodge shared the building with other fraternal orders, including other Odd Fellows organizations, the Order of Scottish Clans, and the Pere Richard Council 2463 of the Knights of Columbus. The Knights of Columbus made use of the building until 1960, when it was purchased by the Spiritual Israel Church and Its Army.

The Spiritual Israel Church and Its Army, a predominantly African American denomination, was founded in Alabama around 1912. The church moved to Detroit around 1923, coinciding with the wave of southern African Americans who came north in the Great Migration. The Detroit congregation was incorporated in 1938, and in the 1940s purchased a building on Hastings Street in Detroit's Black Bottom. The Hastings Street neighborhood was razed to build I-75 in the late 1950s, and in 1960 the church moved into this building, where they have remained until the current day.

== Description ==
Amity Temple is a massive rectangular four-story building of limestone-trimmed red brick. The front facade has six bays, containing paired door and window openings at ground level. This facade reflects the two stages of construction, with the right-hand half (containing three bays) constructed in 1911 and the left-hand half in 1920. The central bay of the right-hand portion contains the main entry doors, and the section is topped by a classical limestone cornice and limestone-trimmed parapet.

Each of the window bays on the lower three stories once contained two large double-hung windows; the upper story bays contained single large three-section windows. All window openings have since been infilled with a stucco-like material, and narrow windows inset into the larger openings.

The rear and side walls of the building are plain brick, and like the front facade contains large window openings, later infilled with narrow windows inserted. The fourth story only extends over a portion of the footprint.
