= Emma V. Kelley =

American educator (1867–1932)

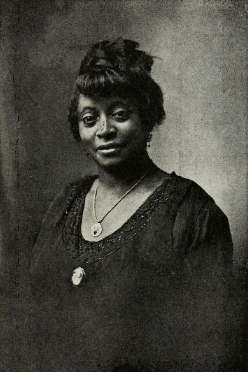
- Kelley in 1921 publication
- Born: Emma Virginia Lee; February 8, 1867; Barrett's Neck, Nansemond County, Virginia, U.S.
- Died: December 14, 1932 (aged 65)
- Resting place: Calvary Cemetery; Norfolk, Virginia, U.S.
- Education: Hampton Normal Institute
- Occupations: Educator; community organizer
- Spouse: Robert Kelley (m. 1893)
- Children: 1

Emma Virginia Kelley (February 8, 1867 – December 14, 1932) was an American educator and community organizer. She founded a women's organization, Daughters of the Improved Benevolent and Protective Order of Elks of the World.

== Early life ==
Emma Virginia Lee was born in Barrett's Neck, Nansemond County, Virginia, the daughter of John Lee and Agnes Walker Lee. She trained as a teacher at Hampton Normal Institute.

== Career ==
Lee taught as a young woman, before she married and became known as Emma Virginia Kelley. In widowhood, she moved to Norfolk, Virginia, where she founded the "Daughters of the Improved Benevolent and Protective Order of Elks of the World," the first women's auxiliary to the Improved Benevolent and Protective Order of Elks of the World (IBPOEW), a black fraternal organization, in 1903. The organization was affiliated with the National Council of Negro Women. She wrote a short history of the organization, published posthumously in 1943.

She served as the President of the Missionary Society at her church, Queen Street Baptist Church in Norfolk, Virginia, from 1902 to 1932 and as the Superintendent of Sunday School for over two decades. Kelley also was the director of the Norfolk Metropolitan Bank and Trust Company, treasurer of the Colored United Charities, and a trustee of the Norfolk Community Hospital.

== Personal life ==
Lee married Robert Kelley in 1893. They had a daughter, Buena Vista Kelley. Kelley was widowed in 1900. She died in 1932, aged 65 years. Her grave in Calvary Cemetery in Norfolk is included on historical tours of the cemetery. The Daughters of Elks national organization presents an annual Emma V. Kelley Achievement Award, named in her memory.
