= J. Finley Wilson =

Newspaperman (1881–1952)

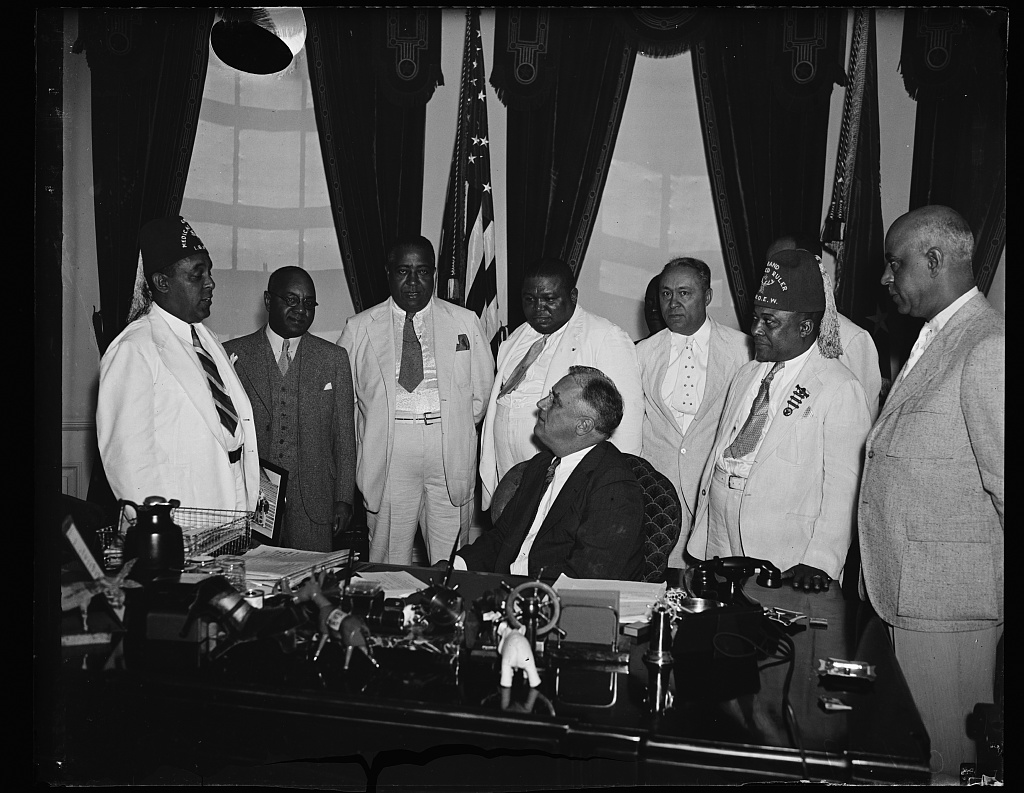
- This image contains President Roosevelt, Dr. Charles B. Fisher, General Convention Chairman, on the extreme left, and J. Finley Wilson, Grand Exulted Ruler, second from the extreme right.
- Born: August 28, 1881; Nashville, Tennessee
- Died: February 18, 1952 (aged 70)
- Occupations: Newspaper editor and owner, activist, leader of the Improved Benevolent and Protective Order of Elks of the World

James Finley Wilson (August 28, 1881 – February 18, 1952) was a newspaperman, leader of the Improved Benevolent and Protective Order of Elks of the World. held appointed public office, and was an influential community leader among African Americans. Emory Libraries have several photographs of him.

== Early life ==
Wilson was born on August 28, 1881 the son of Reverend James L. Wilson and Nancy Wilson. He grew up in Nashville, Tennessee and graduated from Pearl High School. He studied at Fisk University. Wilson went west at worked several odd jobs including mining and ranching before settling in as an editor of several papers. He married Lea Belle Barrar of Richmond, Virginia on July 28, 1924.

== Career ==
Wilson owned the Washington, D.C. Eagle and other Black newspapers. He was elected the leader, or Grand Exalted Ruler, of the Improved Benevolent and Protective Order of Elks of the World on August 28, 1922. Wilson grew the membership of the Elks from 30,000 to 500,000 by his death. He was a Republican. He wrote The mockery of Harding : an open letter published in 1922 and The colored Elks and national defense.

He was described as a "flashy dresser who carries a cane and smokes dreadnaught cigars, he has a marked penchant for flowery speeches, prize fights, and horse races, and a marked distaste for the routine entailed by his lofty office."
