= National Women's Council =

Women's organization in The Bahamas

National Women's Council was a women's organization on The Bahamas, founded in 1958. It was the second women's organization in The Bahamas and the leading women's association for several decades, and played a significant role as one of the two big organizations that successively ran the campaign for women's suffrage on The Bahamas in the 1950s.

== History ==
In 1951–58, a suffrage campaign had been managed by the Women's Suffrage Movement, and a first petition was presented to the House of Assembly in 1952.

In 1958, a second suffrage petition was presented to the House of Assembly of Barbados via Sir Gerald Cash. In September 1958, the Bahamian women's groups of were united under the umbrella organization National Women's Council, which was founded by Doris Johnson with Erma Grant Smith as President and the wife of Sir Dudley Russell as deputy chair, and took women's suffrage as their main issue. The same year, the suffrage reform was given support by the Progressive Liberal Party (PLP), and on 19 January 1959 Dame Doris Johnson held a famous speech to the Assembly in favor of the suffrage reform.

In 1960, the United Bahamian Party (UBP) under the influential Conservative Sir Stafford Sands finally supported the reform with 63 votes against 2. Thereby, the two biggest parties on Tha Bahamas had given their support to the reform, and the suffrage bill could be passed in 1961, given Bahamian women the vote. Janet Bostwick became the first female Member of Parliament in 1977.
