= Corona Theatre School =

British performing arts academy

Location
- 16 Ravenscourt Avenue; Hammersmith; London, W6; England; 51.49375°N 0.23324°W

Information
- Type: Independent Theatre School
- Closed: 2013
- Department for Education URN: 100367 Tables
- Gender: Coeducational
- Age: 11 to 16
- Colours: Green and gold
- Website: http://www.coronatheatreschool.com

Corona Theatre School (formerly Corona Academy) was founded in 1950 as a drama school in west London. After the retirement of its owner, Rona Knight, it reopened as Ravenscourt Theatre School in 1989.

== History ==
=== Corona Academy ===
==== Rona Knight ====
The Corona Theatre School's founder Rona Knight was born on 22 June 1911, the daughter of Leonard and Ellen Edith Speck Knight. She made her first stage appearance at age 11, at a Sunday School benefit. At the age of fourteen, Knight opened the Corona Dancing School, which proved successful. The dancing and singing group became known as the "Corona Babes" (later known as the "Corona Kids"), and in the early 1930s, began to perform professionally, all around the country.

During the Second World War, Knight joined the hospital section of ENSA (Entertainments National Service Association). She chose the stage name Rona Brandon, and became well known as a BBC and recording soprano.

After World War II, Knight attended the Paris school of mime, dance and drama, and in 1950, opened the Corona Academy of Stage Training, in Sutton Lane, Chiswick. In 1955, the Corona Academy moved to larger facilities at 16 Ravenscourt Avenue, Hammersmith, whilst retaining its former premises in Chiswick. The school supplied the young cast for Lionel Bart's Oliver. The Corona Academy of Stage Training closed in 1989, following Miss Knight's retirement.

Ravenscourt Theatre School

Location
- 8–30 Galena Road; Hammersmith; London, W6 0LT; England

Information
- Type: Other independent school
- Established: 1989
- Closed: 2010
- Local authority: Hammersmith and Fulham
- Department for Education URN: 100367 Tables
- Gender: Coeducational
- Age: 7 to 19
- Website: http://www.ravenscourt.net

=== Ravenscourt Theatre School ===
Ravenscourt Theatre School was a stage school in London, for children aged 7 to 19 years old. The school was founded in 1989 by Robin Phillips, following the closure of the Corona Stage Academy, and the retirement of its principal, Rona Knight.

Robin ran the Corona agency for many years, and most of the traditions of Corona were incorporated into the Ravenscourt Theatre School, including the uniform and the teaching format, which had full academic studies in the morning, and vocational training in the afternoon. For much of its life, the school was situated near to Ravenscourt Park Underground station, in what is now the Ravenscourt Park Preparatory School. A similar school opened in Kew in 2009, and in 2010, became the Corona Theatre School, partially taking the name of the former school.

== Corona Theatre School ==
In April 2010, the theatre school, opened as Ravenscourt, became known as Corona Theatre School. The school was a totally independent venture, and had no link with the former Corona Academy, although it did use a similar uniform. The school announced, in February 2013, that it would close.

Students either attended the school on a full-time, part-time or holiday school basis. The full-time school admitted both boys and girls, from the age of 11, and had a curriculum that pivoted around the performing arts. Students had the opportunity to study six GCSEs, and advanced training in all aspects of performing arts (Acting, Dance and Singing), and the opportunity to study towards a BTEC National Diploma in Performing Arts, at the age of 16.

Students were admitted to the school by audition, personal interview, and a written examination.

== Notable former pupils ==
- ALA.NI
- Carol White
- Catherine Howe
- Christian Holder
- Daniella Denby-Ashe
- Dean Gaffney
- Dennis Waterman
- Érin Geraghty
- Francesca Annis
- Frazer Hines
- Helen Worth
- Cheryl Hall
- Jill Haworth
- Judy Geeson
- Kathie Kay
- Keith Faulkner
- Larry Dann
- Lee Whitlock
- Lisa Vanderpump
- Louise Clarke
- Mark Lester
- Michael Redfern
- Michele Dotrice
- Nicholas Lyndhurst
- Nicholas Pinnock
- Nick Pickard
- Nicola Stapleton
- Patsy Kensit
- Ray Winstone
- Richard O'Sullivan
- Robin Askwith
- Sally Geeson
- Serretta Wilson
- Susan George
- Tina Charles

== Corona Management ==
Corona Theatre School ran a school agency, for full-time students, past students, and some actors and actresses from outside the school.
