= Clement T. Maynard =

Bahamian politician (1928–2009)

Clement T. Maynard KCMG

Deputy Prime Minister of the Bahamas
- In office 1985–1992
- Prime Minister: Lynden Pindling
- Preceded by: Arthur Dion Hanna
- Succeeded by: Orville Turnquest

Personal details
- Born: 11 September 1928 Nassau, Bahamas
- Died: 2 October 2009 (aged 81) Nassau, Bahamas
- Party: Progressive Liberal Party
- Spouse: Zoë Ruth Davis Cumberbatch
- Children: 6, including Allyson Maynard Gibson
- Parent: Georgianna Kathleen Symonette (mother)
- Education: Franklin School of Science and Arts
- Occupation: Politician

Sir Clement T. Maynard, KCMG (11 September 1928 – 2 October 2009), was a Deputy Prime Minister of the Bahamas (1985–92), and deputy leader of the Progressive Liberal Party (PLP). His public career ran the gamut from trade unionist to Senator to Member of Parliament.

Maynard was one of only two people, the other Sir Lynden Pindling, to serve in every Bahamian cabinet post, which he did between 18 January 1967 to 18 August 1992. Most notably as Minister of Tourism, a post he held continuously for a decade, making him the Bahamas' longest-serving Minister of Tourism.

He was also the father of former Attorney-General Allyson Maynard Gibson.

== Life and political career ==
Clement Travelyan Maynard, Jr, was born in 1928 in Nassau, Bahamas, the son of Clement Travelyan Maynard, a builder from Barbados (d. 1945), and suffragist Georgianna Kathleen Symonette (1902–1965). He was educated in the Bahamas as well as in the US and in Britain. In 1949, he graduated from the Franklin School of Science and Arts in Philadelphia, returning to Nassau to become the first Bahamian medical technologist.

He joined the Progressive Liberal Party (PLP) in 1954, and from 1959 to 1967 he was the founding president of the Bahamas Public Services Union.

After the general election in January 1967, when the victory of the PLP brought an end to minority government in the Bahamas, he was appointed Government Leader in the Senate. He was elected for the first time to the House of Assembly on 10 April 1968 and re-elected in September 1972, July 1977, June 1982, June 1987 and August 1992. Of the 29 years he spent in the House of Assembly, 25 were as a Cabinet Minister.

The key government ministries in which he served included:

- Minister Without Portfolio from 18 January 1967 to 20 February 1968;
- Minister of State (21 February 1968 – 16 April 1968);
- Minister of Works (17 April 1968 – 13 October 1969); and
- Minister of Tourism and Telecommunications (14 October 1969 – 30 November 1971).

Other portfolios he held included:

- Minister of Health (29 October 1970 – 30 November 1971);
- Minister of Tourism (1 December 1971 – 21 October 1979);
- Minister of Labour and Home Affairs (22 October 1979 – 8 October 1984);
- Minister of Foreign Affairs and Tourism (9 October 1984 – 8 October 1987);
- Deputy Prime Minister (29 October 1985 – 18 August 1992);
- Minister of Tourism and Public Personnel (9 October 1987 – 30 September 1990); and
- Minister of Foreign Affairs and Public Personnel (1 October 1990 – 18 August 1992).

Maynard was the longest serving Minister of Tourism and, under his direction, the Bahamian tourist industry tripled in size from one million annual visitors in the early 1980s to three million by 1986. He believed that "in The Bahamas, tourism is everybody's business".

What he had intended to be the first volume of his memoirs, entitled Put on More Speed: A Bahamian Journey to Majority Rule & Sovereignty, was published in 2007, described as "an important addition to the known sources of information about the most important period in the building of the modern Bahamas".

== Personal life ==
On 17 January 1947, Maynard married Zoë Ruth Davis Cumberbatch, the daughter of Dr Roland and Meta Davis Cumberbatch, and they had five children: Julian (who died of cancer in 1995), Peter, Allyson, David and Clement III. Maynard also had a daughter Andrea from a previous relationship.

== Honours ==
In 1989 Clement Maynard was appointed a Knight Bachelor by Queen Elizabeth, the citation for the award reading: "Over 40 years of outstanding and devoted service to the people of the Bahamas, firstly as a Civil Servant, then as a Senator, Member of Parliament, Minister and Deputy Prime Minister. While a Member of the Public Service, Minister Maynard moved up to the post of Chief Medical Technologist at the Princess Margaret Hospital. He was a founding member of the Bahamas Civil Service Union (now Bahamas Public Service Union) and became its first President in 1959 serving until 1967 when he entered the Senate. He served as Minister of Works, Health, Tourism, Labour and Home Affairs, Foreign Affairs and Public Personnel."

== Death and legacy ==
Having suffered a stroke in 2008 and been hospitalised for some time, he died at home on 2 October 2009, three weeks after his 81st birthday. He was given a state funeral on 14 October 2009.

Paying tribute at the House of Assembly, then Prime Minister Hubert A. Ingraham said:

"Sir Clement is perhaps best remembered as a legendary Minister of Tourism, a portfolio for which he held responsibility on two occasions for a total of 16 years. There are numerous top, award-winning, advertising, public relations, promotional, training and tourism awareness campaigns, for which he must be credited. They include:

- 'It’s Better in The Bahamas' – undoubtedly one of the most widely-recognized advertising slogan in the world
- The Bahama Host Training Program – which has trained 33,700 persons
- The People-to-People Programme
- Goombay Summer which was the longest running and most successful promotional/folkloric campaign that transformed The Bahamas into a year-round tourism destination
- National Tourism Achievement Awards."

As part of the Cacique Awards to recognise leadership in promoting tourism, the Clement T. Maynard Lifetime Achievement Award is made by the Bahamas Ministry of Tourism.

On 8 July 2013, a housing development named in honour of Sir Clement Maynard and his son Julian Maynard was opened by Prime Minister Perry Christie, who said in his keynote address: "This is the first estate to be named in honour of two people and is done for specific reasons. One reason is to highlight that change, that working to make a difference in your country is a multi-generational process; it is a family affair. Sir Clement is well known throughout our country for his political activism and ultimately for his key role in the new Commonwealth of The Bahamas. He has the distinction of being the longest serving Minister of Tourism and in many ways, laid and built upon the foundations of modern Bahamian tourism."
