= Women's Suffrage Movement =

Women’s Suffrage Movement (WSM) was a women's organization on The Bahamas, founded in 1951. It was the second women's organization in The Bahamas and the leading women's association for several decades, and played a significant role as one of the two big organizations that successively ran the campaign for women's suffrage on The Bahamas in the 1950s.

== History ==
The Bahamas was a British colony until 1964. Women's suffrage was introduced in 1918, but The Bahamas was not included in the reform. When Rufus Ingraham lost the Bahamian election of 1949, his wife Mary Ingraham believed he would have had a chance to win if women had the right to vote, and started a campaign for women's suffrage in The Bahamas with Mabel Walker, the President of the Civil Liberties Committee of the Curfew Elks Lodge.

They formed a women's group in 1951, the Women’s Suffrage Movement (WSM), with Mary Ingraham as its President; among its members were Georgianna Symonette and Eugenia Lockhart. They collected over 500 names in support of the reform, and a first petition in favor of the reform was presented to the House of Assembly, via Dr CR Walker in 1952.

In 1958, a second suffrage petition was presented to the House of Assembly of Barbados via Sir Gerald Cash. In September 1958 the Bahamian women's groups were united under the umbrella organization National Women's Council, who took over the campaign.
