= Geoffrey Holder =

Trinidadian-American actor and dancer (1930–2014)

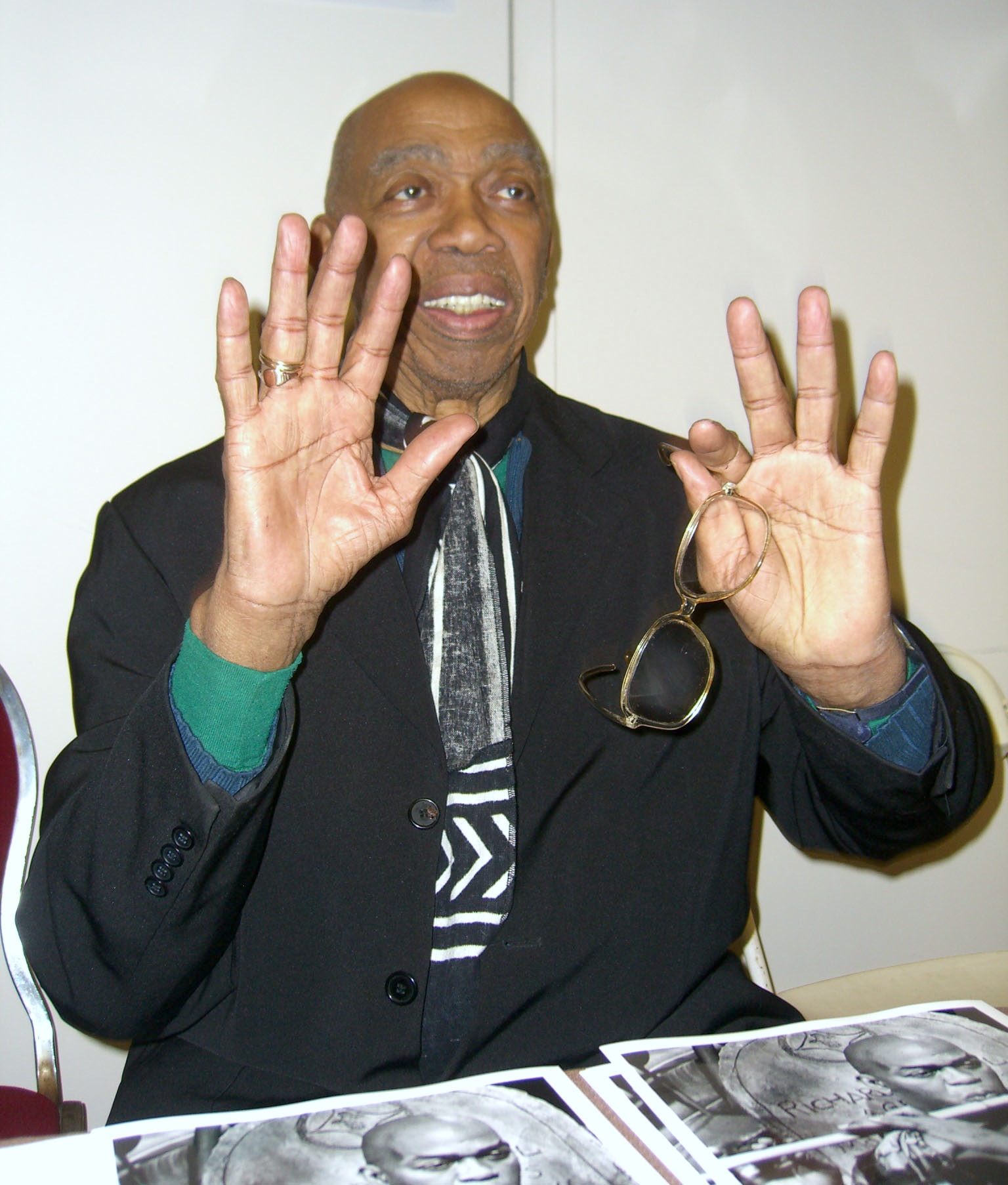
- Holder at the Big Apple Con 2008
- Born: Geoffrey Lamont Holder; August 1, 1930; Port of Spain, Trinidad and Tobago, British West Indies
- Died: October 5, 2014 (aged 84); New York City, U.S.
- Education: Queen's Royal College
- Occupations: Actor; voice actor; singer; dancer; composer; choreographer; director
- Years active: 1954–2014
- Spouse: Carmen de Lavallade (m. 1955)
- Children: 1
- Family: Boscoe Holder (brother); Christian Holder (nephew); Ralph McDaniels (second cousin)
- Awards: Tony Award for Best Direction of a Musical; 1975 The Wiz; Tony Award for Best Costume Design; 1975 The Wiz; Drama Desk Award for Outstanding Costume Design; 1975 The Wiz

Geoffrey Lamont Holder (August 1, 1930 – October 5, 2014) was a Trinidadian-American actor, dancer, musician, director, choreographer, and artist. He was a principal dancer for the Metropolitan Opera Ballet, before his film career began in 1957 with an appearance in Carib Gold. For his theatre work, Holder won two Tony Awards: Best Direction of a Musical and Best Costume Design in a Musical for the original Broadway production of The Wiz.

In 1973, Holder played the villainous Baron Samedi in the James Bond film Live and Let Die. He also appeared in such films as Doctor Dolittle (1967), Annie (1982), and Charlie and the Chocolate Factory (2005). Holder was the voice of Ray the Sun on the children's television series Bear in the Big Blue House (1998–2002) while he also carried out advertising work as the pitchman for 7 Up.

== Early life ==
Born in Port of Spain, Trinidad, on August 1, 1930, Holder was one of four children of Barbadian and Trinidadian descent born to Louise de Frense and Arthur Holder. He was educated at Tranquility School and Queen's Royal College in Port of Spain. Holder made his performance debut at age seven in his brother Boscoe Holder's dance company.

== Career ==
After seeing Holder perform in St. Thomas, Virgin Islands, choreographer Agnes de Mille invited him to work with her in New York. Upon arriving, Holder joined Katherine Dunham's dance school, where he taught folkloric forms for two years.

From 1955 to 1956, Holder performed with the Metropolitan Opera Ballet as a principal dancer. Previously, he made his Broadway debut in the 1954 Harold Arlen and Truman Capote musical House of Flowers. While working on House of Flowers, Holder met Alvin Ailey, with whom he later worked extensively, and Carmen de Lavallade, his future wife. After the show closed, Holder starred in an all-black production of Waiting for Godot in 1957.

Holder began his movie career in the 1962 British film All Night Long, a modern remake of Shakespeare's Othello. He followed that with Doctor Dolittle (1967) as Willie Shakespeare, leader of the natives of Sea-Star Island. In 1972, Holder was cast as the Sorcerer in Everything You Always Wanted to Know About Sex (But Were Afraid to Ask). The following year, he was a henchman—Baron Samedi—in the Bond movie Live and Let Die. Holder contributed to the film's choreography. In the film, his character was meant to fall into a coffin of live snakes, about which Holder had a phobia. He considered refusing to do the stunt but agreed to do it when it was revealed that Princess Alexandra would be visiting the set.

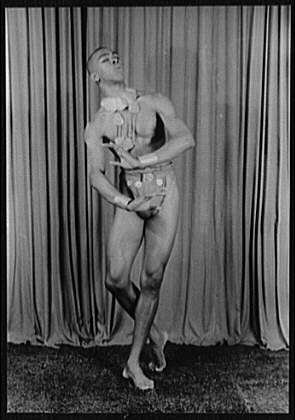
Holder performing in 1954

In addition to his movie appearances, Holder was a spokesman in advertising campaigns for the soft drink 7 Up in the 1970s and 1980s, declaring it the "uncola", and, in the 1980s, calling it "crisp and clean, and no caffeine; never had it, never will".

In 1975, Holder won two Tony Awards for direction and costume design of The Wiz, the all-black musical version of The Wizard of Oz. Holder was the first Black man to be nominated in either category. He won the Drama Desk Award for Outstanding Costume Design. The show ran for 1,672 performances.

As a choreographer, Holder created dance pieces for many companies, including the Alvin Ailey American Dance Theater, for which he provided choreography, music, and costumes for Prodigal Prince (1967), and the Dance Theatre of Harlem, for which he provided choreography, music, and costumes for Dougla (1974), and designed costumes for Firebird (1982). In 1978, Holder directed and choreographed the Broadway musical Timbuktu! Holder's 1957 piece "Bele" is also part of the Dance Theater of Harlem repertory.

Holder portrayed Jupiter, the hulking manservant of an ill-fated treasure-hunter (Roberts Blossom), in a 1980 made-for-television adaptation of Edgar Allan Poe's The Gold-Bug which also starred Anthony Michael Hall. In John Huston's 1982 film adaptation of the hit stage musical Annie, Holder played the role of Punjab, Albert Finney's bodyguard. He portrayed the Ghost of Christmas Future in John Grin's Christmas, a 1986 variation on Charles Dickens' A Christmas Carol directed by its star, Robert Guillaume. Holder portrayed Nelson in the 1992 film Boomerang with Eddie Murphy. He was also the voice of Ray in Bear in the Big Blue House and provided narration for Tim Burton's 2005 film version of Roald Dahl's Charlie and the Chocolate Factory. Holder reprised his role as the 7 Up spokesman in the 2011 season finale of The Celebrity Apprentice, where he appeared as himself in a commercial for "7 Up Retro" for Marlee Matlin's team.

In 1990, Holder performed at the 62nd Academy Awards, singing "Kiss the Girl" and "Under the Sea" from The Little Mermaid. Three years later, Holder did a series of commercials for the Armory Auto Group auto dealership in Albany, New York.

Holder was a prolific painter (patrons of his art included Lena Horne and William F. Buckley, Jr.), ardent art collector, book author, and music composer. As a painter, he won a Guggenheim Fellowship in fine arts in 1956. A book of Holder's photography, Adam, was published by Viking Press in 1986.

In 2024, the Victoria Miro Gallery in London showed the joint exhibition Boscoe Holder | Geoffrey Holder, in which, according to The Guardian's reviewer, "radiant, sensual paintings of black men and women reflect just how far ahead of their time the Holder brothers were", and which was described by Nicole-Rachelle Moore as "full of magic that is both familiar and incredible". A new text by Attillah Springer entitled Vetiver and Turpentine accompanied the show.

== Personal life ==
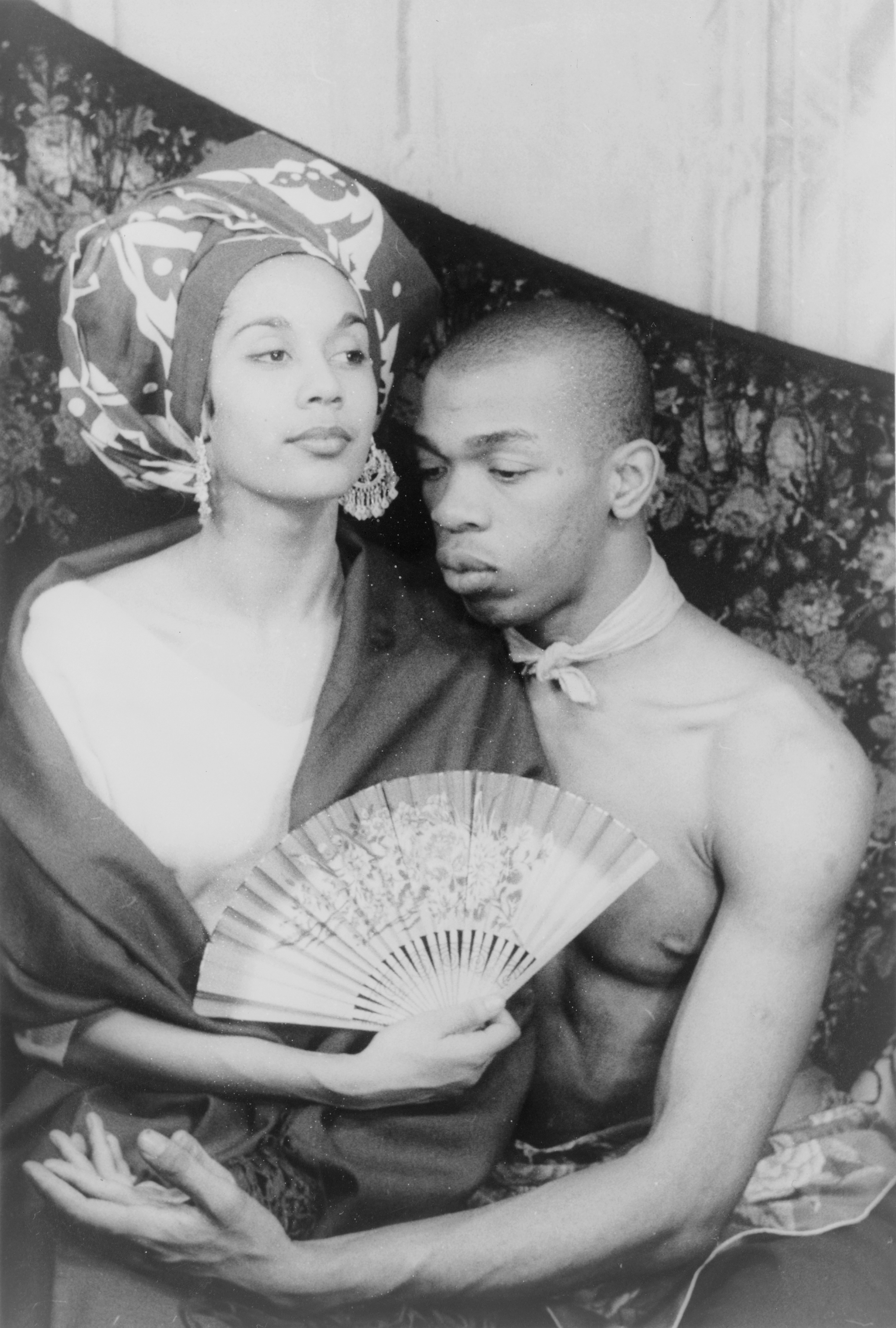
Holder (right) with his wife, Carmen de Lavallade. Photo by Carl Van Vechten, 1955.

Holder married Carmen de Lavallade (1931–2025) in 1955. They spent their lives in New York City and had a son, Léo. They were the subject of a 2005 documentary, Carmen & Geoffrey. His elder brother, Boscoe Holder, was a dancer, choreographer, and artist, whose son Christian Holder also won acclaim as a dancer, choreographer, and entertainer.

== Death ==
Geoffrey Holder died in New York City of complications from pneumonia on October 5, 2014, at age 84.

== Books ==
- Holder, Geoffrey; Harshman Tom (1969). Black Gods, Green Islands. Illustrated by Geoffrey Holder (First ed.). Garden City, New York: Doubleday & Co. LCCN 59-16232. OCLC 500597262. Negro Universities Press: Second edition, 1969 (ISBN 0-8371-2789-0 (reprint); OCLC 500597262).
- Holder, Geoffrey (1973). Geoffrey Holder's Caribbean Cookbook. New York: Viking Press. ISBN 978-0-670-33662-3. OCLC 2700931.
- Holder, Geoffrey (1986). Adam. Photographs by Geoffrey Holder. New York: Viking. ISBN 0-670-81028-2. OCLC 13560379.
- Holder, Geoffrey; University Art Museum (1995). Geoffrey Holder: The Painter. Albany, New York: State University of New York at Albany. ISBN 0-910763-13-5. OCLC 32925000.
- Holder, Geoffrey; Falke, Stefan; Lovelace, Earl (2004). Moko Jumbies: The Dancing Spirits of Trinidad. Photographs by Stefan Falke. New York: Pointed Leaf Press. ISBN 0-9727661-3-8. OCLC 56652502.

== Productions ==
=== Broadway ===
- House of Flowers, Original Musical, 1954 – Banda dance choreography, performer
- Josephine Baker, musical review, 1954 – Performer
- Waiting for Godot, revival (all black cast), 1957 – Performer
- The Wiz, original musical, 1975 – Direction, costume design (Tony Award for Best Costume Design and Best Direction of a Musical, 1975)
- Timbuktu!, original musical, 1978 – Direction, choreography, costume design, playbill cover illustration
- The Wiz, revival, 1984 – Direction, costume design
- The Boys' Choir of Harlem and Friends, staged concert, 1993 – Staging

=== Radio ===
- KYOT-FM in Phoenix, Arizona, 1994–2011 – Voiceover

=== Filmography ===
Film
Year	Title	Role	Notes
1957	Carib Gold	Voo Doo Dancer	Film debut
1959	Porgy and Bess	Dancer	Uncredited
1962	All Night Long	Himself	Uncredited
1967	Doctor Dolittle	Willie Shakespeare	
1968	Krakatoa, East of Java	Sailor	
1972	Everything You Always Wanted to Know About Sex (But Were Afraid to Ask)	The Sorcerer	
1973	Live and Let Die	Baron Samedi	Also choreography
1975	The Noah	Friday (voice)	Voice
1976	Swashbuckler	Cudjo	Also choreography
1982	Annie	Punjab	
1987	Where Confucius Meets the New Wave	Narrator	
1992	Boomerang	Nelson	
1998	Hasards ou coïncidences	Gerry	
1999	Goosed	Dr. Bowman	
2005	Charlie and the Chocolate Factory	Narrator	Voice
2006	Joséphine Baker. Black Diva in a White Man's World		
2008	The Magistical	Narrator	
Television
Year	Title	Role	Notes
1958	Aladdin	The Genie	
1967	Androcles and the Lion	The Lion	
1967–1968	Tarzan	Zwengi/Mayko	2 episodes
1973	The Man Without a Country	Slave on ship	
1983	Alice in Wonderland	The Cheshire Cat	
1986	John Grin's Christmas	Ghost of Christmas Future	
1988	The Cosby Show	Choreography	Choreographed the season 5 opening credits
1990	The 62nd Annual Academy Awards	Performing	
1998–2002	Bear in the Big Blue House	Ray the Sun	Voice
2002–2003	Cyberchase	Master Pi	Voice, Episode 118, "Problem Solving in Shangri-La"
2002–2003	Cyberchase	Master Pi	Voice, Episode 209, "Double Trouble"
2011	The Celebrity Apprentice	Himself	
Video games
Year	Title	Role	Notes
1994	Hell: A Cyberpunk Thriller	Jean St. Mouchoir	One of only two live actors in the game (as opposed to voice only)
2005	Charlie and the Chocolate Factory	Narrator	Voice
