= Boscoe Holder =

Trinidadian artist, dancer, choreographer, and musician (1921–2007)

- Born: Arthur Aldwyn Holder; 16 July 1921; Arima, Trinidad and Tobago, British West Indies
- Died: 21 April 2007 (aged 85); Newtown, Port of Spain, Trinidad and Tobago
- Education: Queen's Royal College
- Occupations: Painter, designer and visual artist, dancer, choreographer, musician
- Spouse: Sheila Clarke (m. 1948)
- Children: Christian Holder
- Family: Geoffrey Holder (brother); Ralph McDaniels (second cousin)

Boscoe Holder (16 July 1921 – 21 April 2007), born Arthur Aldwyn Holder in Arima, Trinidad and Tobago, was one of Trinidad and Tobago's leading contemporary painters, who also had a celebrated international career spanning six decades as a designer and visual artist, dancer, choreographer, and musician.

Living in London, England, during the 1950s and 1960s, Boscoe Holder has been credited with introducing limbo dancing and steelpan playing to Britain, performing on British television and radio, in variety and nightclubs, in films, and at well-known theatres in London's West End. His company also danced for Queen Elizabeth II at her coronation in 1953, and, two years later, at Windsor Castle.

He is considered one of the top painters from the Caribbean and his works are in many collections around the world. Known for his paintings of Caribbean people and culture, Holder often used his dancers as models, including his wife, Sheila Clarke, who was also lead dancer in his company.

== Early life ==
Born in Trinidad to Louise de Frense and Arthur Holder from Barbados, Boscoe Holder was the eldest of five children. He attended Tranquility Intermediate School and Queen's Royal College. He started a musical career at a young age, playing the piano professionally for rich French Creole, Portuguese, and Chinese families. In his teens, he began painting seriously. He was an early member of the Trinidad Art Society, along with people such as Ivy Hochoy, Hugh Stollmeyer, and Amy Leong Pang.

Holder also formed his own dance company, the Holder Dance Company. His paintings and dances focused on Afro-Caribbean tradition, inspired by the shango, bongo and bélé dances of enslaved people. In 1947, he visited the United States, where he taught dance at the Katherine Dunham School and exhibited his paintings at a gallery in Greenwich Village. On his return to Trinidad in 1948, he married Sheila Clarke, the lead dancer of his company. Holder's younger brother, actor Geoffrey Holder, joined Boscoe's dance company at the age of seven.

== London years ==
In April 1950, Holder with his wife and son went to live in London, which became their home for the next two decades, their circle of friends including Oliver Messel and Noël Coward. Holder formed a group by the name of Boscoe Holder and his Caribbean Dancers, and introduced steel drums to England on his television show, Bal Creole, broadcast on BBC Television on 30 June 1950. Holder also choreographed and appeared in the 1953 BBC Television production The Emperor Jones (based on the Eugene O'Neill play of the same title).

The dance company toured internationally in Finland, Sweden, Belgium, France, Spain, Czechoslovakia, Italy, Monte Carlo, and Egypt). In 1953, it performed at the coronation of Queen Elizabeth II, representing the West Indies. Holder and Clarke appeared again before the Queen in 1955, at a Command Performance at Windsor Castle.

On 31 July 1955, Holder and his troupe appeared in a concert billed as "The First Caribbean Carnival in London" held at the Royal Albert Hall, sponsored by entrepreneur Hugh Scotland. In January 1959, the Boscoe Holder dance troupe was a headline act, performing "Carnival Fantasia", at the Caribbean Carnival organised by Claudia Jones held in St Pancras Town Hall.

From 1959, for four years, Holder produced, choreographed and costumed the floorshow in the Candlelight Room of The May Fair Hotel. There he also formed and led his own band, The Pinkerton Boys, which alternated with Harry Roy's orchestra. Holder later co-owned a private club called the Hay Hill in Mayfair. He appeared in several films, including Sapphire (1959), and in television series such as Danger Man and The Saint. He also danced in Nice, Monte Carlo, and Paris with Josephine Baker. On a visit to Trinidad in December 1960, Holder and Clarke put on a show entitled At Home and Abroad at Queen's Hall in Port of Spain, performed by local dancers and featuring dances based on Brazilian, Haitian, and Trinidadian folklore.

As well as dancing, during these years Holder continued to paint and his work was exhibited at various UK galleries, including the Trafford Gallery; The Redfern Gallery; the Commonwealth Institute; the Castle Museum Nottingham; the Martell Exhibition of Paintings, Drawings and Sculpture at the Royal Watercolour Society Galleries; and the Leicester Galleries.

== Return to Trinidad and later years ==
After being based in London for 20 years, in 1970 Holder returned to Trinidad and re-established himself as a painter "with an unbroken record of annual shows from 1979 onwards, sometimes two, three or four in a year." His work has been exhibited across the Caribbean and internationally. In 1981, a Holder painting was presented by the then-President of Trinidad and Tobago, Ellis Clarke, as a wedding gift from the nation to Prince Charles and Lady Diana.

In 2006, the Art Society of Trinidad and Tobago and Gallery 101 exhibited 58 works by Holder, dated from 1991 to 2002.

== Personal life ==
In 1948, Holder married dancer Sheila Davis Clarke, daughter of radio personality Kathleen Davis, and their son Christian was born the following year. Christian Holder eventually became a leading dancer with the Joffrey Ballet as well as an artist.

Holder's younger brother was actor Geoffrey Holder, best known for his role as Baron Samedi in the 1973 James Bond film Live and Let Die.

== Death ==
Holder died at the age of 85 in 2007, at his home in Newtown, Port of Spain. He had suffered from prostate cancer, as well as complications from diabetes.

== Awards and honours ==
In 1973, in recognition of Boscoe Holder's contribution to the arts, the government of Trinidad and Tobago awarded him the gold Hummingbird Medal and named a street after him.

In 1978, the Venezuelan government presented him with the Francisco de Miranda award.

The Mayor of Washington DC declared 22 May 1983 as Boscoe Holder and Geoffrey Holder Day, in recognition of their contribution to the arts.

On 7 April 1991 in Philadelphia, Boscoe Holder, Christian Holder, and Geoffrey Holder received the first Drexel University Award for International Excellence.

On 31 October 2003, Boscoe Holder was awarded an honorary degree Doctor of Letters degree by the University of the West Indies.

In December 2004, the government of Trinidad and Tobago issued an official Christmas series of postage stamps featuring six of Holder's paintings.

== Legacy ==
Holder's work was included in a 2010 exhibition in Berlin curated by Peter Doig and Hilton Als.

In October 2011, an exhibition of 50 of Holder's artworks was dedicated at the Upper Room Art Gallery at Top of the Mount, Mount Saint Benedict, Saint Augustine, as the gallery's contribution to the United Nations's International Year for People of African Descent.

In 2012, Holder's former studio at 84 Woodford Street, Port of Spain, became the "101 Art Gallery at Holder's Studio", owned by Mark Pereira. It is now a Heritage House, owned by the Bissessarsingh family.

In 2024, the Victoria Miro Gallery in London showed the joint exhibition Boscoe Holder | Geoffrey Holder, in which, according to The Guardian's review, "radiant, sensual paintings of black men and women reflect just how far ahead of their time the Holder brothers were," and which was described by Nicole-Rachelle Moore as "full of magic that is both familiar and incredible." An essay by Attillah Springer, "Vetiver and Turpentine", accompanied the show, and a limited edition fine art book by Christian Holder entitled Boscoe Holder: Travels in Rhythm, A life of Art and Dance was published by Rosenstiels. The exhibition was the first to present the Holder brothers' paintings in tandem.
