= Allyson Maynard Gibson =

Bahamian barrister, politician, and community rights advocate (born 1957)

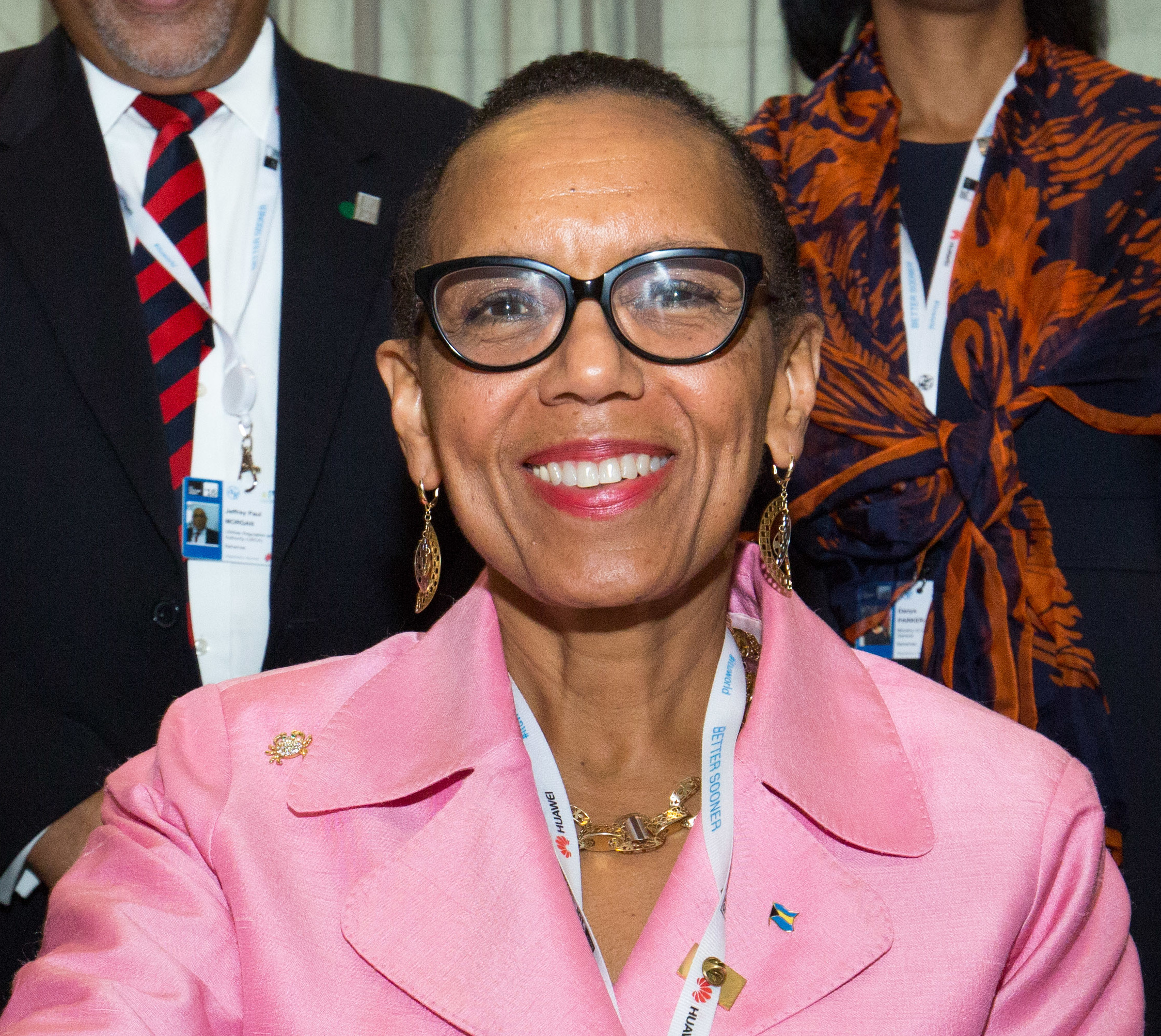
- Maynard Gibson at the ITU Telecom World 2016

Attorney General and Minister for Legal Affairs of The Bahamas
- In office 10 May 2012 – May 2017
- Preceded by: John Delaney
- Succeeded by: Carl Bethel

Personal details
- Born: Zoe Camille Allyson Maynard; 11 January 1957 (age 69) Nassau, Bahamas
- Spouse: Maxwell E. Gibson
- Children: 2 daughters
- Parents: Clement T. Maynard (father); Zoë Ruth Davis Cumberbatch (mother)
- Relatives: Meta Davis Cumberbatch (maternal grandmother); Georgianna Kathleen Symonette (paternal grandmother)
- Education: Barry University (B.Sc.); London School of Economics (LL.B, LL.M); Council of Legal Education
- Occupation: Barrister, politician

Allyson Maynard Gibson KC (born 11 January 1957) is a Bahamian barrister, politician, and community rights advocate, particularly with regard to laws affecting women and children. From 2012 to 2017, she was the Attorney-General and Minister for Legal Affairs of The Bahamas, and leader of government business in the Senate of the Bahamas. From 2002 to 2007, she served as Minister of Financial Services and Investments in the Progressive Liberal Party (PLP) administration.

She is the daughter of former deputy prime minister (1985–92) Clement T. Maynard.

== Early years and education ==
Zoe Camille Allyson Maynard was born in Nassau, Bahamas, in 1957, to Clement T. Maynard and Zoë Maynard, as the only daughter of their five children, her brothers being Julian (who died of cancer in 1995), Peter, David and Clement III.

She attended Barry University in Miami, Florida, where she earned a B.Sc. (Management, Marketing & Economics) in 1975, aged 18, the youngest graduate in Barry's history at the time. She then continued her studies in England, at the London School of Economics & Political Science, attaining her LL.B (Hons.) in 1979 and the LL.M in 1980, followed by graduate studies at the Council of Legal Education in London, between 1979 and 1980. She was admitted to the bar in the U.K. and Wales in July 1980, and to the Bahamas bar in December 1980.

== Law career ==
She went into private practice as senior partner in the law firm Gibson & Company, a partner with Maynard & Co. and an associate with Seligman, Maynard & Co. She was also an articled clerk to David Goldberg in Chambers of Milton Grundy, Gray's Inn, London, England. She has spoken of being encouraged to become involved with politics by Sir Lynden Oscar Pindling, first prime minister of the Bahamas: "He felt it was very important for those who had a voice, for those who had a commitment to our country to get involved.... I'm humbled to think that he saw a little bit of talent in me."

== Political career and public service ==
At the 2 May 2002 general election, she was elected as a member of Parliament representing the New Providence South–Pinewood constituency, and in the new Progressive Liberal Party (PLP) government was appointed to the Cabinet as the first Minister of Financial Services and Investments. In the 2007 Bahamian general election, Byron Woodside was declared winner in the Pinewood election court recount by 49 votes against Maynard Gibson.

Following the PLP victory in the May 2012 general election, she was sworn in as attorney general, holding the office until the change of government after the general election in May 2017. She is also vice-chair of the Caribbean Financial Action Task Force and the second vice-chair of REMJA (the Attorneys General of Central and Latin America).

Over the years, her work has included significant legal reforms, such as statutory maternity leave with guaranteed employment upon return to the workplace after confinement, protecting the identities of rape victims and domestic violence and sexual harassment laws. Well known as an advocate for the rights of women and children, she was president (2009–11) of the International Women's Forum (IWF) and the IWF Leadership Foundation, is also a past president of the Nassau (Bahamas) chapter of The Links, Incorporated, a member of Zonta International (an organization with the mission of advancing the status of women), and is regularly involved with voluntary work connected with the empowerment of girls and women and a variety of social issues. She has been associated with many voluntary groups including the Chance Foundation (working on education reform), the Anglican Church Women, the Bahamas Women's Forum and, as founding director, the Yellow Elder Community Library Association and the Senior Citizen's Centre.

She outlined her principles in a 2009 interview:

"'...I believe that women and men must work together to build a better country and a better world,' she said. 'I am a part of a loving family that has for generations been dedicated to public service. My grandmother Meta Davis Cumberbatch has been called the mother of the arts in the Bahamas. (My grandmother) Georgiana K. Symonette, was the secretary of the Women's Suffrage Movement. My mother, Zoe, Lady Maynard, served in World War II, was the first female juror in the Bahamas and was a trade unionist, among other community involvement. (These women) gave me living examples of being agents of positive change. I hope to be a similar example to my daughters, Zoe and Demetra. Also my husband Max, whose family also continues to be involved in public service, is a tower of strength,' said Senator Maynard-Gibson."

== Honours ==
In 2011, Maynard Gibson was honoured by the All-China Women's Federation for "Outstanding Contributions to Women's Leadership".

In 2013, she featured on a list celebrating the top 100 women of influence from diverse backgrounds working in fields ranging from government to philanthropy across the major international financial centres (IFCs). The following year she was named again on a similar list, "The 2014 IFC Power Women Top 200", which focuses on influencers and professionals, and "recognises women of achievement who are opinion formers, helping to promote business excellence in their home jurisdiction and consolidating the reputations of the financial services industry globally."

In July 2014, at the 66th Alpha Kappa Alpha Boulé in Charlotte, North Carolina, she was inducted as an honorary member of Alpha Kappa Alpha sorority (ΑΚΑ), to which her daughter Zoe also belongs.

In January 2015, she became the first woman to be appointed a Queen's Counsel in the Bahamas.

On 19 February 2015, she was honoured with Barry University's Distinguished Alumni Award, recognizing "distinguished professional achievements and contributions to society through service".

== Personal life ==
She is married to Maxwell E. Gibson and they have two daughters, Zoe and Demetra.
