= Carib Gold =

1956 maritime themed B-movie by Harold Young

- Directed by: Harold Young
- Written by: Charles Gossett
- Screenplay by: Charles Gossett; D. Lyle Kretsinger
- Produced by: Warren Coleman
- Starring: Ethel Waters; Coley Wallace; Peter Dawson; William T. Hill; Geoffrey Holder; Cicely Tyson
- Cinematography: Charles O'Rork
- Edited by: Michael Young
- Music by: Frank Fields; Emil Velazco; Pinky Herman
- Production company: Onyx Pictures
- Distributed by: Splendora Film Corporation
- Release date: 20 September 1956 (United States)
- Running time: 62 minutes
- Country: United States
- Language: English

Carib Gold is a maritime-themed 1956 B-movie, written and filmed almost entirely in Key West, Florida, with locally-cast musicians and extras. Its cast is largely African-American headlined by Ethel Waters and features the first known film roles for both Geoffrey Holder and Cicely Tyson. The story was written by Navy veteran Charles Gossett.

Thought lost for decades, the film is now in the public domain and was digitized in early 2012 and released online for free public viewing by Southern Methodist University, as part of the G. William Jones Film and Video Collection at the university's Hamon Art Library.

== Plot ==
The movie starts with Neely, a shrimping boat's skipper, calling in to shore with news of a good catch. Subsequent conversations with Barb, his mate/deckhand and Cap, his boss on shore, reveals that this boat (the Capt. Geech) has snagged and torn several nets recently due to something on the sea floor, despite the charts showing nothing in the area. Cap and Neely decide that despite the financial strain of losing their expensive nets, they can afford one more trip to investigate the source of the snags.

Neely and Barb go to Duffy's restaurant where they meet Mom, Ryan and Baby. Neely asks to speak privately with Ryan and requests that Mom sing his favorite song. It is Baby's birthday, but she agrees to leave the table while Mom steps up to the stage and performs the film's title song, Carib Gold. During the song, Barb and Neely talk to Ryan about diving to the sea bed to look for the cause of the torn nets. He agrees, and they make arrangements to set out the following morning.

Barb's wife Dottie sees them off at the dock, and he promises her they will be back soon. When they reach the area, the boat's crew assists Ryan into his standard diving suit. Ryan goes over the side while crewmen operate the manual hand pump, and Barb and Neely operate the communications unit. On reaching the bottom, Ryan heads south and quickly discovers what appears to be the wreckage of a boat. He brings up a coin and discusses his discovery of sunken treasure with Neely and Barb, mentioning that there is bullion as well. The three speculate that they have discovered a "Spanish plate ship."

Back at Duffy's, the three discuss salvaging the ship with Cap and Mom. Ryan points out that a larger and trustworthy crew will be required in order to salvage the wreck. Barb goes home and tells Dottie about the find, shows her the coin and tells her that they need to "chip in," in order to help finance the salvage of the wreck. Dottie begins to cry, disbelieving that the coin is real and thinking that this will deprive her of needed surgery.

Barb introduces a new diver, Lechock, to the rest of the salvage crew, who seem wary of the newcomer but take him on and agree to set out the next morning. Once underway, Lechock quickly shows himself to be a belligerent shipmate, threatening to toss another member of the crew overboard. At the site, Ryan once again suits up and returns to the wreck, while filling a basket the crew later sent down for retrieval of the treasure. Lechock appears mesmerized by the bullion when it comes aboard, while Ryan remains working underwater. Neely calls Cap with their status, who promises to bring out supplies so that they can remain at the site and work. As Cap's supply boat approaches later, Lechock is suiting up for a dive. Neely explains to Cap that Lechock has alienated the entire crew and seems to have "a chip on his shoulder."

After sundown, Lechock is seen putting a pistol into his waistband and slipping into the cabin where the gold is kept in an apparently unlocked safe. While taking two of the gold bars, he accidentally wakes Barb, pistol-whips him to death and then escapes with the bullion by stealing Cap's boat. Ryan, Neely and Cap see Lechock leave with the boat, then investigate the cabin where they discover the stolen bullion and Barb's body. Neely calls the Key West harbor police to report the murder, then orders Willie to drop a marker buoy so they can return to port. Later, Willie is seen on deck with a voodoo doll.

After daybreak, a Coast Guard boat pursues Lechock at high speed but loses him in shallow water near the coast, while the Capt. Geech puts into port. Lechock then abandons the boat, buries the gold bars on the beach, and runs into the woods. The police are waiting at the dock as the Capt. Geech comes in, and once the boat is tied, Ryan and Willie leave while the police talk to Cap and Neely. Ryan picks up Mom in a taxi and explains what has happened while they are on the way to tell Dottie that her husband has been killed. Ryan vows to find Lechock as Dottie breaks down and cries in Mom's arms.

The next scene is of a voodoo ritual, opening to a view of Willie's voodoo doll (representing Lechock) hung on a board painted with a vèvè. A voodoo dancer, drummers and white-clad women all participate while Willie shakes a maraca during the ritual. With his chicken-feather whisk, the dancer selects a woman who joins him in the dance, soon to be followed by the entire group as the dancer brushes the doll with the whisk.

As Ryan searches for Lechock, the fugitive evades the police by slipping through a door. The door happens to lead into the "Key Oasis" bar, where Ryan is having a drink. When Ryan notices Lechock, he immediately attacks while the other patrons watch. The fight results in Lechock knocked out on the floor as Ryan leaves the bar. He returns to Duffy's, where Mom urges him to stay and let law enforcement handle the case. Ryan agrees, then Willie bursts in to tell them that Lechock has been arrested for Barb's murder.

== Cast ==
- Ethel Waters as "Mom" Ryan: Ryan's mother, owner of Duffy's bar and restaurant.
- Coley Wallace as Ryan: a diver who discovers sunken treasure while investigating the cause of the torn nets.
- Peter Dawson as Neely: skipper of the shrimping boat, the Capt. Geech..
- Richard Ward as Lechock: a diver hired to help salvage the shipwreck, but who steals some of the treasure and murders Barb.
- Cecil Cunningham as Barb: Mate/deckhand on the Capt. Geech.
- William T. Hill as Cap: Owner & manager of the Capt. Geech.
- Cicely Tyson as Dottie: Barb's wife, who needs unspecified surgery.
- George Renna as Bartender.
- Diana Sands as Bar Girl.
- Henry Hayward as Willie: a deckhand on the Capt. Geech.
- Ruth Sawyer as Baby: Ryan's wife, girlfriend or fiancee (relationship unspecified).
- Geoffrey Holder as Voo Doo Dancer [sic].

== Filming ==
With the exception of its underwater sequences, which were shot at the then newly constructed Miami Seaquarium, the movie was entirely shot in Key West, Florida in 1955. Many local residents were cast as musical and acting performers.

== Release and reception ==
The film premiered on Sunday, September 20, 1956, exclusively at the Strand and Monroe Theaters on Duval Street in Key West. The film's premiere was segregated, with the Strand screening the film for whites and the Monroe screening it for blacks. Following its premiere, the film had a very short run, being shown in both theaters for only two more days.
