= Wemyss Bight, Bahamas =

Wemyss Bight
- The location of Wemyss Bight within the Bahamas
- Coordinates: 24.7358°N 76.2181°W
- Country: Bahamas

Population (2010)
  - Total: 335
- Time zone: UTC-5 (EST)
  - Summer (DST): UTC-4 (EDT)
- ISO 3166 code: BS-SE

Wemyss Bight is a settlement in South Eleuthera, the Bahamas. At the 2010 census, the population was 335.

== Notable people ==
- Georgianna Kathleen Symonette (1902–1965), suffragist
- Chris Brown (1978–), sprinter
