= Minnie T. Wright (clubwoman) =

African American clubwoman (fl. 1920s–1930s)

Minnie T. Wright (fl. 1920s–1930s) was an American clubwoman from Boston. She was one of the organizers seeking a building for African-American woman's club activities in Boston and served as president of the Massachusetts Union of Women's Clubs from 1928 to 1932. An African American, she belonged to the Women's Municipal League, the Daughters of the Improved Benevolent and Protective Order of Elks of the World, and attempted to set up official rules for joining the Northeastern Federation of Colored Women's Clubs, requiring that any applying clubs must be involved in charity and that every woman in the club must attend church. She was elected president of the Northeastern Federation of Women's Clubs Inc on September 6, 1934.
