= Singleton Palmer =

American jazz multi-instrumentalist and bandleader (1912–1993)

Singleton Palmer (November 13, 1912, St. Louis, Missouri – March 8, 1993, St. Louis) was an American jazz multi-instrumentalist and bandleader of the Dixieland Six.

== Career ==
Palmer began playing cornet at age 11, and was actively playing gigs with the Mose Wiley Band in St. Louis by 14. In 1928, he began playing tuba, and joined Oliver Cobb's Rhythm Kings in 1929. Palmer's first recordings were with Cobb in 1929, and he continued to perform with the band through 1934. Following Cobb's death in 1931, Eddie Johnson took over leadership for the band, renaming it the St. Louis Crackerjacks. He recorded with the band under Johnson's leadership in 1932, and switched to string bass in 1933. In 1934, Palmer joined Dewey Jackson on the riverboats, and performed with him until 1941.

Beginning in 1941, Palmer took a job at Scullin Steel, where he joined the company's 45-piece big band, which performed for the employees in the cafeteria during the daily lunch hour. He additionally began performing with George Hudson's first band in 1941, continuing until 1947. Toward the end of the 1940s, Palmer began to get higher-profile performing and recording opportunities, including with Clark Terry in 1947 and Jimmy Forrest in 1948. Additionally, he played bass on record with blues musicians such as Big Joe Williams and Sonny Boy Williamson. In 1947 he joined Count Basie's 18-piece jazz band, touring for 3 years and recording 11 sides.

In 1950, Palmer left Basie's group and started his own band, the Dixieland Six. Palmer led this Dixieland jazz ensemble in jam sessions at the Universal Dance Hall on the DeBaliviere Strip, an entertainment street on the west side of St. Louis. The Dixieland Six would go on to perform at Gaslight Square at the Opera House, and record six albums between 1960 and 1967. Palmer became a source for jazz historians late in his life, offering oral history testimonies of his early years in the music industry.
