= Daughters of the Improved Benevolent and Protective Order of Elks of the World =

Female auxilary of the Elks Clubs

- Founded: July 1903; 123 years ago Norfolk, Virginia
- Type: Fraternal order
- Affiliation: Improved Benevolent Protective Order of Elks of the World
- Status: Active
- Scope: National
- Pillars: Charity, Justice, Patriotism, and Sisterly and Brotherly Love
- Headquarters: United States

The Daughters of the Improved Benevolent Protective Order of Elks of the World are the female auxiliary of the Improved Benevolent Protective Order of Elks of the World, an African American spin off of the Benevolent and Protective Order of Elks. Like the latter organization, which officially has female auxiliaries, the Daughters are also officially recognized and encouraged by its male counterpart. The organization was founded by Emma V. Kelley in 1902, but not formally recognized as an auxiliary until 1916. The organization awards an annual Emma V. Kelley Achievement Award in her honor.

== History ==
The first local group or "Temple" of the Daughters of the Improved Benevolent Protective Order of Elks of the World was founded as the Norfolk Temple No. 1 in Norfolk, Virginia by Emma V. Kelley. The first public meeting was held in July 1903 at the St. John African Methodist Episcopal Church with forty participants. Kelley organized the Daughters "with a sole purpose to unite all women of sound bodily health and good moral character; to give moral and material aid, and elevate its members; and to put the women in touch with one another, from the Atlantic to the Pacific and from the Great Lakes to the Gulf of Mexico; and if possible join hands with our sisters on the shores of Africa."

The Daughters take the 13th chapter of First Corinthians as their guide. Their motivating principles are Charity, Justice, Sisterly Love and Fidelity. The Daughters organized as a national organization or "Grand Temple," with temples from Alabama, Pennsylvania, and Virginia, for the National Elks convention on September 9, 1903.

The Improved Benevolent Protective Order of Elks of the World did not officially accept the Daughters but Kelley was elected to put together a ritual, constitution and by-laws. A juvenile department was founded in 1907. By 1913, forty-eight temples existed. In 1916, the Daughters were formally adopted as the auxiliary to the I.B.P.O.E.W. By Kelley's death in 1932, there were over 35,000 members.

== Structure and membership ==
As stated, the national organization is known as the "Grand Temple" and locals are called "Temples." In 1979, the Daughters was reported to have Temples in the United States, Canada, Mexico, Cuba, the Virgin Islands, other parts of the West Indies and Panama. That year it was reported to have 450,000 members. The head of the Temple is known as the Daughter Ruler and the head of the Grand Temple is the Grand Daughter Ruler.

== Philanthropy ==
In its first fifty years, the Daughters raised over two million dollars in college scholarships for youth of all races. The Daughters were also active during the civil rights movement in the 1960s and 1970s.

== Selected US Temples ==
The Bi-State Association, now the Tri-State Association, was formed between Maryland and Delaware on February 7, 1923. The organization became the Tri-State Association when two Washington, D. C. lodges joined in 1931.

== Notable members ==
- Lucy J. Brown, social justice activist and public servant
- Erma Henderson, American activist and politician in Detroit
- Mary Ingraham, Bahamian suffragist
- Emma V. Kelley, founder of Daughters of the Improved Benevolent and Protective Order of Elks of the World
- Ernest Mae McCarroll, physician and activist
- Grace Snively, community activist
- Minnie T. Wright, clubwoman
