= Hagerstown Charity School =

- U.S. National Register of Historic Places
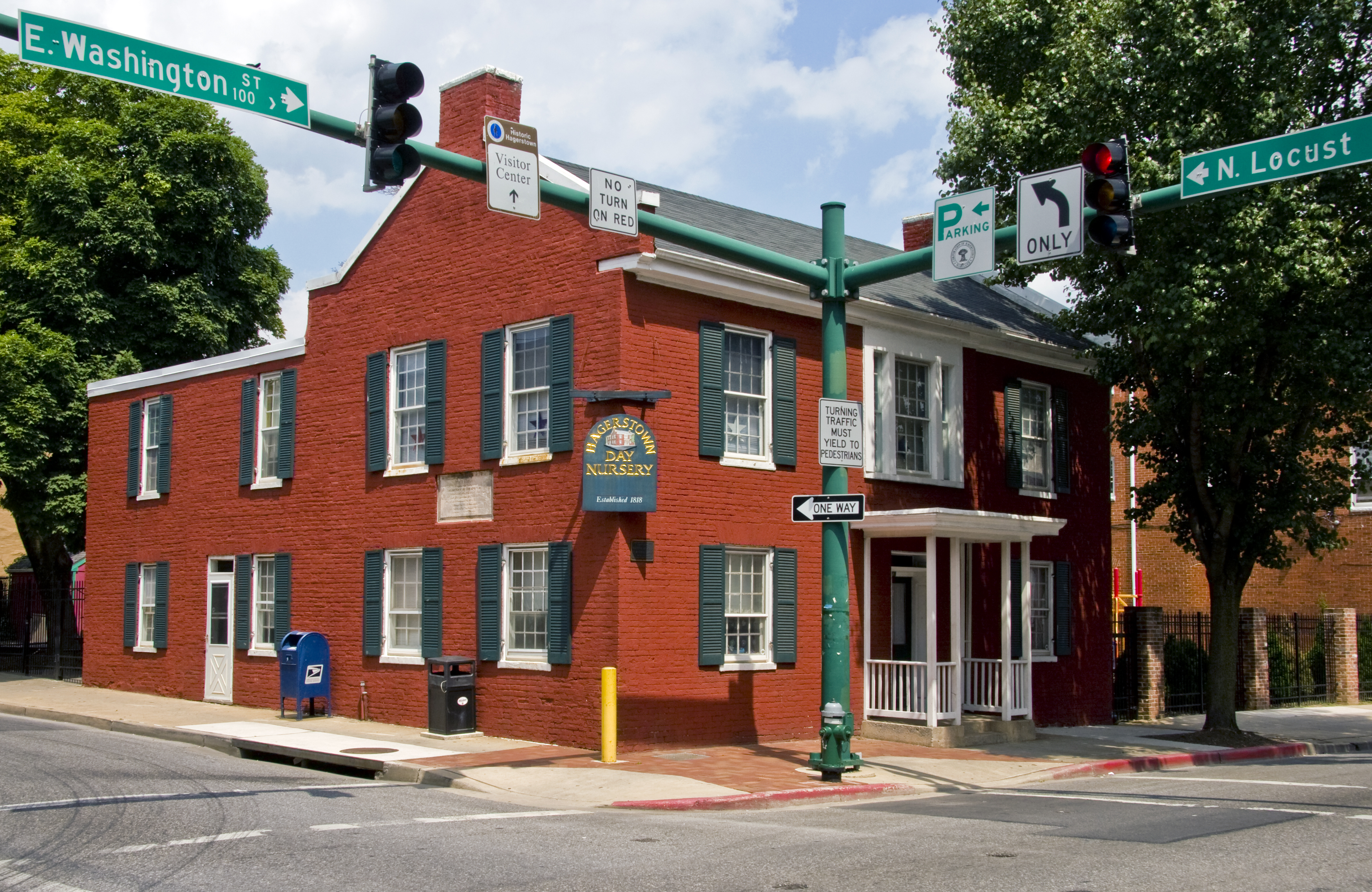

- Location within Maryland Location within the United States
- Location: 102 E. Washington St., Hagerstown, Maryland
- Coordinates: 39°38′26″N 77°43′5″W
- Area: less than one acre
- Built: 1840
- Architectural style: Neo-Classical
- NRHP reference No.: 82001601
- Added to NRHP: December 16, 1982

Hagerstown Charity School, also known as Hagerstown Day Nursery, is a historic school building located at the northeast corner of the intersection of East Washington and North Locust Streets in Hagerstown, Washington County, Maryland, United States. It is a two-story, three bay painted brick structure dating from about 1840. The school was founded by the Hagerstown Female Society which, in addition to being concerned with schooling underprivileged children, was also concerned with feeding and clothing them. The building continues as home to a child care facility.

It was listed on the National Register of Historic Places in 1982.
