= Kathleen Warner =

Trinidad and Tobago radio personality (1903–1996)

- Born: Kathleen Davis; 1903; Port of Spain, Trinidad
- Died: December 1996 (aged 92–93); Trinidad
- Other name: Aunty Kay
- Education: Trinity Girls School; Bishop Anstey High School
- Occupations: Actress, radio personality
- Known for: The Aunty Kay Show (1942–1985)
- Spouses: Percival McIntosh Clarke (m. 1924) Hilton Warner (m. 1955)
- Children: Sheila Clarke
- Relatives: Meta Davis (sister); Christian Holder (grandson)

Kathleen Warner, née Davis (1903 – December 1996), was a Trinidadian actress and radio personality, also known as "Aunty Kay". She is best remembered as the long-time host of the popular children's programme The Aunty Kay Show, which aired from 1942 to 1985 on Radio Trinidad every Sunday afternoon. A multi-talented woman, she was during the course of her life a medical student, pianist, singer, actress, dancer, broadcaster and teacher, giving lessons in music and elocution, as well as briefly serving as an alderman of the Port of Spain City Council. In 2007, a biography of her was being written by historian Tony Martin.

== Early life and acting career ==
Kathleen Davis was born to James Augustus Davis and Ruth O'Neill Davis in Port of Spain, Trinidad, where she went to Trinity Girls School and Bishop Anstey High School, and then in 1919, together with her two older sisters, Meta and Beryl, completed her education in Britain, attending Redland High School, near Bristol, as a boarder. She went on to study for two years at the School of Medicine for Women, part of London University, but had to discontinue medical studies after the death of her father, and later studied speech and elocution in London.

Becoming an actress, she featured alongside Paul Robeson in the London stage production of the play Stevedore, by Paul Peters and George Sklar, which opened at the Embassy Theatre on 9 May 1935, with a cast that included Black actors of American, West Indian, African, and English background. A notice by Nancy Cunard in The Crisis said: "Kathleen Davis as 'Ruby' and the Gold Coastian Ahuma as 'Joe Crump' are both beautiful and have great personality."

Kathleen Davis was also in the cast of the 1936 play about Toussaint Louverture by C. L. R. James (her friend from Trinidad) that was staged in London's West End starring Robeson. In addition she acted in several films, including in a leading role in Debt of Honour (1936), starring Leslie Banks.

== Broadcasting career ==
Returning to Trinidad after the outbreak of World War II, Davis began the broadcasting career for which she is best remembered, as the children's presenter "Aunty Kay". Back in England for the 1953 coronation of Queen Elizabeth II, she took part in a celebratory BBC Children's Television programme, together with Boscoe Holder, Sheila Clarke, Billy Sholanke and the Russell Henderson Steel Band.

=== The Aunty Kay Show, 1942–85 ===
As Aunty Kay, she became a popular broadcaster on Radio Trinidad, hosting one of the most important shows for young people of the time, which ran for 43 years (1942–85) and "featured mostly talented young people from the low-income areas who came every Sunday to display their singing talents.... It was a half-hour show which began at two o’clock in the afternoon and ended at two thirty. But, that half-hour was enough time for those talented children to get their fifteen minutes of community fame to show their various talents." As Richard Bolai recalls, "recitations, singing and oration was encouraged. What was particularly striking about the show was the theme song. One of Auntie Kay's signature items was her eloquence in grammar, this always struck me as ironic because the theme song was filled with slang." The Aunty Kay Show provided an early platform for many of Trinidad and Tobago's performers to make their debut as youngsters, including Heather Headley, Lancelot Layne and calypsonian Slinger Francisco, better known as The Mighty Sparrow.

== Personal life ==
In 1924 Dr Percival McIntosh Clarke became her first husband. Her daughter, Sheila, was born in England (and would eventually marry artist and dancer Boscoe Holder). They returned to the Caribbean at the outbreak of World War II, surviving shipwreck when the path of their ship the Simón Bolívar was mined by the Germans on 18 November 1939. Kathleen Davis subsequently married Hilton Warner, in 1955.

She died in December 1996 at the age of 93.

== Honours and legacy ==
In 2006, she was posthumously honoured with an Award for Excellence by the Trinidad and Tobago Publishers and Broadcasters' Association, for her "Outstanding & Pioneering Contribution to the development of radio in Trinidad and Tobago, with special emphasis on providing an avenue for the exposure of young talent and contributing to the overall development of young people".

On 21 July 2007, she was one of 10 women remembered as having "made a mark in culture" to be honoured in Amadi Productions' annual concert entitled "Ambataila Women" at La Joya. Forming part of the Emancipation 2007 celebrations, the concert was creatively based around the cultural contribution of: Marjorie Padmore, Olive Walke, Kathleen "Aunty Kay" Warner, Olga Comma-Maynard, Cheryl Byron, Winifred Atwell, Daisy Voisin, Jean Coggins-Simmons, Beryl McBurnie and Beulah "Lady B" Bobb.

A collection of her memorabilia is held by The University of the West Indies Library.
