= Improved Benevolent and Protective Order of Elks of the World =

African American fraternal order

- IBPOEW
- Founded: 1897; 129 years ago Cincinnati, Ohio, US
- Type: Fraternal order
- Affiliation: Independent
- Status: Active
- Emphasis: African American
- Scope: International
- Colors: Purple and White
- Chapters: 1,500 lodges
- Members: 500,000 active
- Headquarters: 101 Hobson R. Reynolds Road; P.O. Box 159; Winton, North Carolina 27986; United States
- Website: ibpoew.org

The Improved Benevolent and Protective Order of Elks of the World (IBPOEW) is an African-American fraternal order modeled on the Benevolent and Protective Order of Elks. It was established in 1897 in the United States. In the early 21st century, it has 500,000 members and 1500 lodges in the world.

== History ==
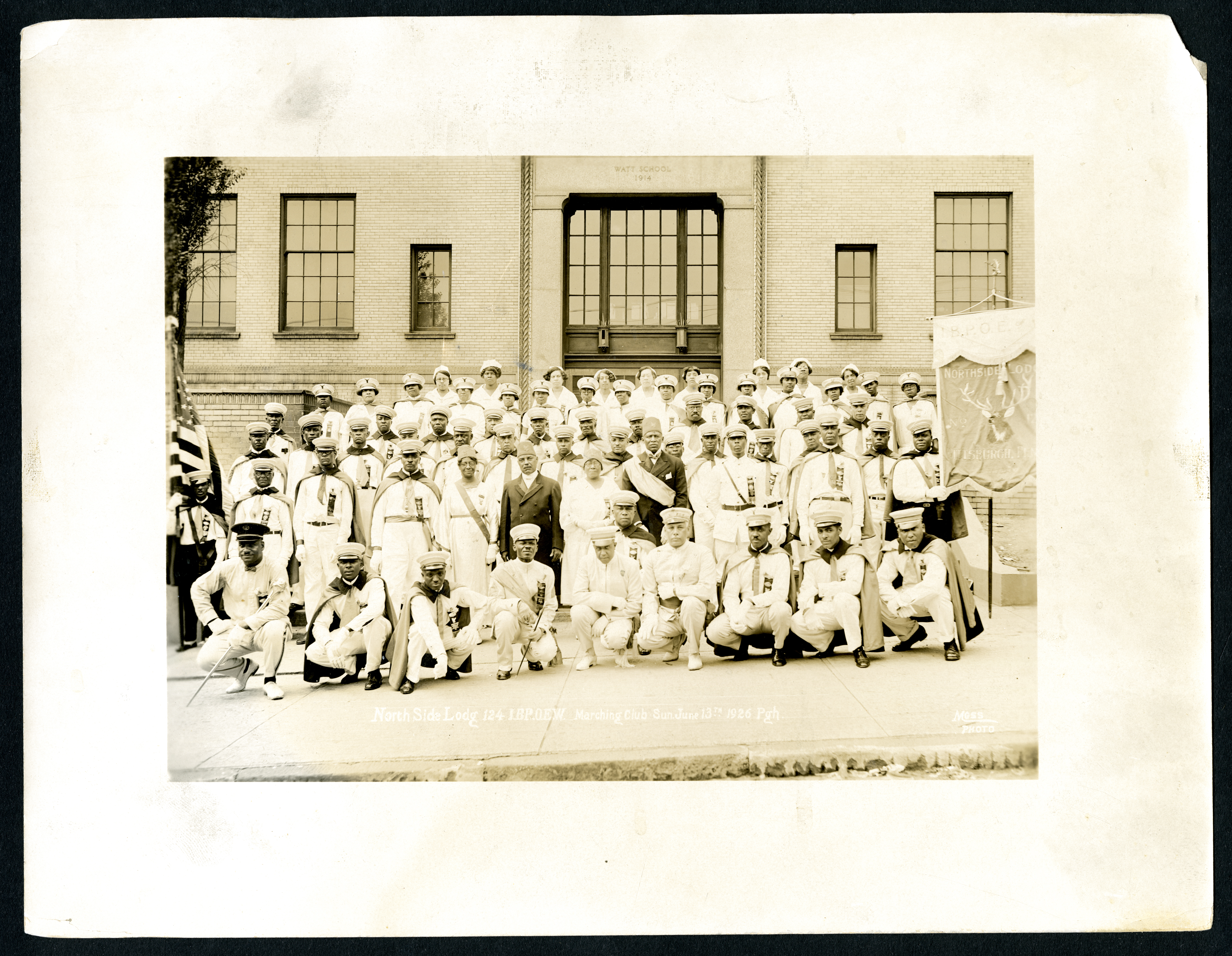
North Side Lodge 124 I.B.P.O.E.W. marching club, Sunday, June 13th, 1925, Pittsburgh, taken outside of Watt School

The Order claims descent from the Free African Society, the first formal black society in America, founded in 1787 in Philadelphia, Pennsylvania as a mutual aid society by Absalom Jones and Richard Allen. That organization later resulted in the founding of the first African-American congregation in the Episcopal Church, headed by Jones, and the founding of the African Methodist Episcopal Church, the first independent black denomination, by Allen.

The formation of the Improved BPOE as a separate order, however, began in February 1897, when it was established in Cincinnati, Ohio, by city residents B. F. Howard and Arthur J. Riggs. The latter was a Pullman porter who had been born into slavery. The men had met in another fraternal association and wanted to establish a chapter of Elks; the white organization refused them admission. (It was only in 1972 that the white-majority BPOE opened admission to African Americans and other minorities.) Riggs had gained a copy of the BPOE ritual and received the first copyright for it, establishing their organization in September 1898. The first meeting of the new IBPOEW organization was held on Thursday, November 17, 1898. This was a period of a rise in black fraternal associations, with men organizing to work in community and create strong networks.

The BPOE disputed the African Americans' use of the ritual, but they held the copyright. In 1912 the Improved, Benevolent Protective Order of Elks of the World was sued by the Benevolent and Protective Order of Elks in the State of New York to keep them from using the "Elks" name. The New York Court of Appeals ruled in favor of the BPOE, with Judge Barlett stating, "If the members desired the name of an animal there is a long list of beasts, birds, fishes which have not yet been appropriated for such a purpose." The decision was apparently ignored after the IBPOEW made a minor change in the letters on their seal.

The IBPOEW founded a Civil Liberties department in 1926. It was active in opposing the segregation of schools in Gary, Indiana, the next year. The number of blacks in the city had increased markedly during the Great Migration, as men were attracted from the rural South to the city's industrial jobs. At the same time, there were also numerous European immigrants settling in the city.

Dr. William J. Thompkins, officer in the I.B.P.O.E.W., visits President Roosevelt to invite him to review the parade for the order at their convention in Washington, D.C. August 27, 1935

During the 1930s and 1940s, the IBPOEW was active in the effort of blacks to "gain work while resisting union exclusion, workplace segregation, and unemployment." According to historian Venus Green, the Improved Elks labor activism was distinguished from other black fraternal organizations by their "cross-class alliances, male/female solidarity, racial unity, a willingness to join coalitions across ideologies and to engage in multiple forms of struggle, especially militant mass mobilization." In the IBPOEW, ideologies ranged from Christianity to Communism, but the members worked together to achieve labor goals.

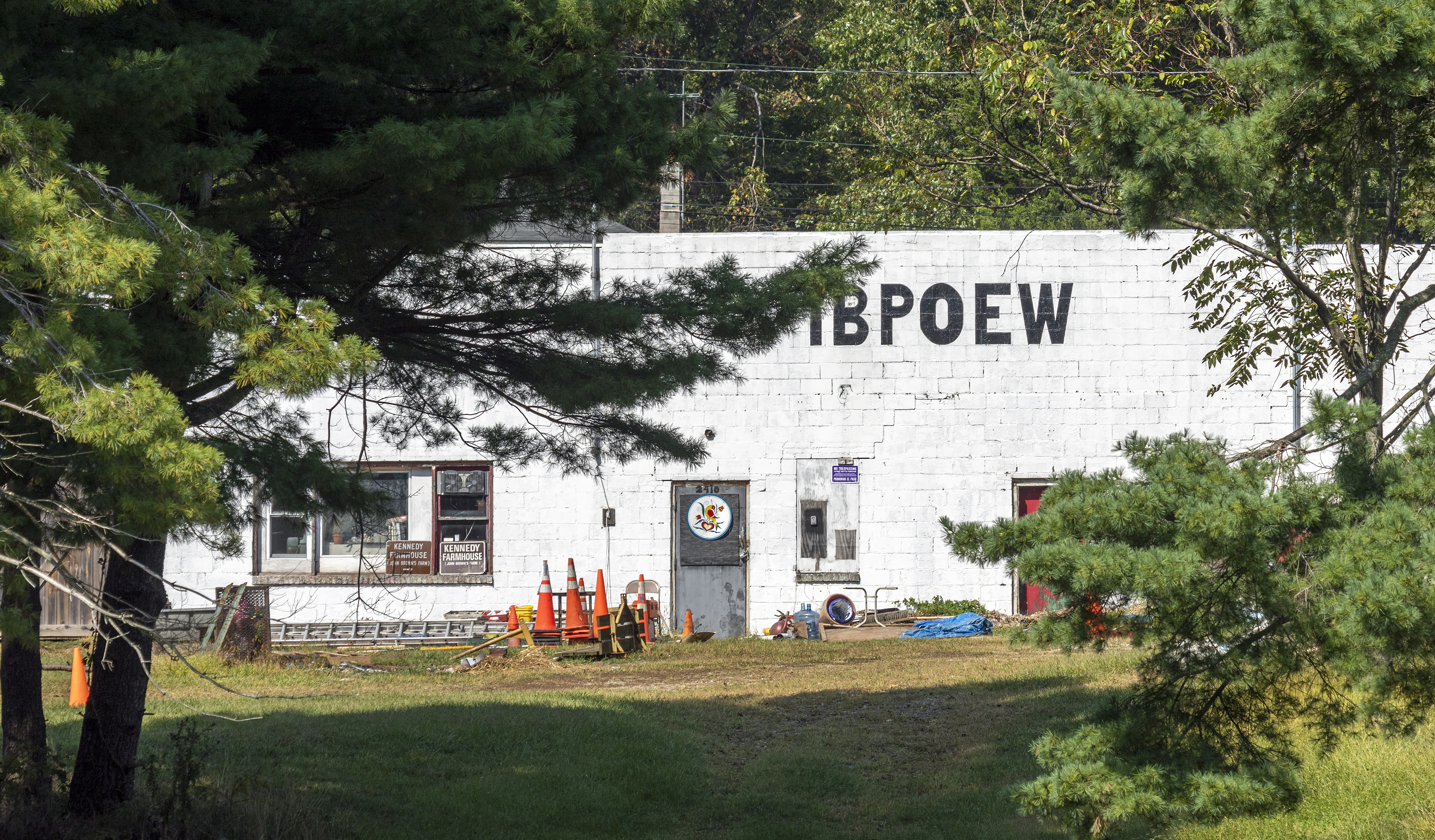
The Kennedy Farm meeting hall

From 1950 to 1966, the IBPOEW owned and operated as their National Shrine "The John Brown Farm" (also known as "The Kennedy Farm") in southern Washington County, Maryland. That property was the site where John Brown (abolitionist) had trained his troops in anticipation of his raid on Harpers Ferry, West Virginia in 1859; this was a catalyst for the American Civil War and the abolition of slavery. The Elks purchased the property as a memorial to Brown and built several buildings on the 235-acre property, including a 50' by 124' auditorium that was used as a meeting place for Elks gatherings of up to three thousand persons on Fourth of July and Labor Day weekends. The auditorium was rented on summer weekends by a local black entrepreneur, John Bishop, who booked into that venue dozens of the biggest stars of rhythm and blues, including Ray Charles, Aretha Franklin, James Brown, Marvin Gaye, Little Richard, Chuck Berry, B. B. King, Eartha Kitt, Otis Redding, Etta James, The Coasters, and The Drifters.

The order's historical importance as a place of activism continues to be a central aspect of its public image, that has even reached the interest of scholars and historians.

== Symbols ==
The order's colors are royal purple and white.

== Organization ==
The organization and titles of the Improved Elks are reportedly modeled on that of the BPOE. Its Grand Lodge meets annually, and the organization is headquartered in Winton, North Carolina. The Improved Elks have an officially recognized female auxiliary, the Daughters of the Improved Benevolent Protective Order of Elks of the World. They were organized by Emma V. Kelley on June 13, 1902, in Norfolk, Virginia.

In 1923 the IBPOEW convention in Chicago was attended by 3,000 delegates. At that meeting J. Finley Wilson was re-elected "Grand Exalted Leader."

== Membership ==
In 1979, the Improved Elks had approximately 450,000 members. In the early 21st century, they have 500,000 members in 1500 lodges around the world. Like other fraternal associations in the United States, both black and white, the Improved Elks have been dealing with declining membership as older members die. Younger people face a different world, and seem less inclined to join such associations that purposefully discriminated against women and also require religious belief.

== Ritual ==
Just like the BPOE, the Improved Elks have kept much of their original ritual intact.

== Benefits and philanthropy ==
The Improved Elks in the United States sponsor scholarship programs, youth summer computer literacy camps, help for children with special needs, and extensive community service activities.

== Selected US lodges ==
=== Arkansas ===
- William Townsend Lodge, No. 1149, of Pine Bluff

=== California ===
- Clementine Lodge, No. 598, of San Diego
- Warren McCree Lodge, No. 1285, of Pittsburg

=== Colorado ===
- Pikes Peak Region Lodge, No. 473, of Colorado Springs, CO
- Empire Lodge, No. 1493, of Denver
- Mountain Lodge, No. 39, of Denver

=== Connecticut ===
- Shining Star Lodge of Stamford
- Goodwill Lodge, No. 1325, Waterbury
- New Nutmeg charter Oak, No. 67, of Hartford, Connecticut
- Pride of Connecticut, New Britain, Connecticut
- Carter L Marshall of Danbury, Connecticut
- Victory Lodge, No 1096 New London, Connecticut

=== Delaware ===
- Paul Laurence Dunbar Lodge, No. 106, of Wilmington

=== District of Columbia ===
- Columbia Lodge, No. 85, of Washington, D.C.

=== Kansas ===
- Peerless Princess Lodge, No. 243, of Wichita
- Midwest Lodge, No. 1444, of Topeka
- Kaw Valley Lodge, No. 265, of Lawrence

=== Massachusetts ===
- Commonwealth Lodge, No. 19, of Boston
- Quinsigamond Lodge, No. 173, of Worcester, Massachusetts
- Harmony Lodge, No. 140, of Springfield, Massachusetts
- Obie Knox Lodge, No. 1568, Holyoke, Massachusetts

=== Michigan ===
- James L. Crawford Lodge, No. 322, of Ann Arbor

=== New Jersey ===
- Sunlight Elks Lodge of Trenton, New Jersey
- Monmouth Lodge, No. 122, of Asbury Park, New Jersey
- Pride of Camden Lodge, No. 83, of Camden, New Jersey
- Centennial Lodge, No. 400, of Westfield, New Jersey

=== New York ===
- Imperial Lodge, No. 127, of New York City
- Brooklyn Lodge, No. 32
- Neptune Lodge, No. 743, of New York City
- Industry Lodge, No. 889, of New York City
- Syracuse Lodge, No. 1104, of Syracuse

=== Ohio ===
- Alpha Lodge, No. 1, of Cincinnati, Ohio
- Waldorf Lodge, No. 76, of Dayton, Ohio
- Harvey H. Alston Sr Lodge, No. 1755, Columbus, Ohio
- Spirit of Ohio Lodge, No. 52, of Cleveland, Ohio
- Glenville Elks Lodge, No. 1494, of Cleveland, Ohio
- Prosperity Lodge No. 1971, of Columbus, Ohio
- Pride of Rubbertown Lodge, No. 1594, of Akron, Ohio

=== Pennsylvania ===
==== Philadelphia ====
- Quaker City Elks Lodge No. 720, IBPOEW, Philadelphia, was founded in 1926. In 1945 it was the reportedly the second-largest African-American Elks lodge in the country. In 1930, the Lodge erected a home at 1943 Christian Street, in the area now known as the Christian Street Historic District.
- Christopher Perry Lodge, No. 965, of Philadelphia
- Leonard C. Irvin Lodge, No. 994, of Philadelphia
- Edward W. Henry Lodge, No. 1235, of Philadelphia
- O.V. Catto Lodge, No. 20, of Philadelphia

==== Rest of state ====
- John A. Watts Lodge, No. 224, of Chester
- B.F. Howard Lodge, No. 580, of Media
- John F. Moreland Lodge, No. 801, of Monaca
- Maple View Lodge, No. 780, of Elizabeth
- North Side Lodge, No. 124, of Pittsburgh
- Lawrence Lodge, No. 18, of New Castle
- Berks Lodge, No. 47, Reading
- Unity Lodge, No. 71, of Harrisburg
- Conestoga Lodge, No. 140, of Lancaster
- Capt. Levi M. Hood Lodge, No. 159, of West Chester
- Cyrene Lodge, No. 169, of Steelton
- Arandale Lodge, No. 184, of Altoona
- Canon Lodge, No. 186, of Canonsburg
- Twin City Lodge, No. 187, of Farrell
- Clinton J. Lewis Lodge, No. 201, of Bristol
- Edgar A. Still Lodge, No. 207, of Williamsport
- Booker T. Washington Lodge, No. 218, of McKeesport
- Brighton Pioneer Lodge, No. 219, of Beaver Falls
- Valley Lodge, No. 294, of New Kensington
- Gem City Lodge, No. 328, of Erie
- Flood City Lodge, No. 371, of Johnstown
- Elmwood Lodge, No. 438, of Norristown
- Monroe Lodge, No. 513, of Stroudsburg
- Okay Lodge, No. 697, of Monessen
- William E. Burrell Lodge, No. 737, of North Hills
- Twin County Lodge, No. 838, of Vandergrift
- Montgomery Lodge, No. 1271, of Pottstown
- Bethal Lodge, No. 1284, of Bethlehem

== See also ==
- Prince Hall Freemasonry
- Grand United Order of Odd Fellows
- List of African-American Greek and fraternal organizations
