= Meta Davis Cumberbatch =

Bahamian activist, musician and poet (1900–1978)

Meta Davis Cumberbatch MBE
- Born: Meta Davis; 4 May 1900; San Fernando, Trinidad
- Died: 29 December 1978 (aged 78); The Bahamas
- Education: Trinity Girls School; Bishop Anstey High School; Royal Academy of Music
- Occupations: Pianist, composer, poet, playwright and cultural activist
- Children: Zoë Maynard
- Relatives: Kathleen Davis (sister); Allyson Maynard Gibson (granddaughter)

Meta Davis Cumberbatch MBE (4 May 1900 – 29 December 1978) was a Trinidad-born pianist, composer, poet, playwright and cultural activist, who spent the majority of her life in The Bahamas, where she used her talents to enhance the country's cultural development, becoming known as the "Mother of the Arts". At the 2014 Independence anniversary celebrations in Nassau she was honoured as a Bahamian "Cultural Warrior".

== Biography ==
Meta Davis was born in San Fernando, Trinidad, on 4 May 1900, to James Augustus Davis and Ruth O'Neill Davis, who were both originally from St. Vincent and the Grenadines. Meta's musical talent manifested itself early and she could pick out a tune on the piano before she could write her own name. After attending Trinity Girls School and Bishop Anstey High School in Port of Spain, Meta and her younger sisters Beryl and Kathleen were sent by their parents to England in 1919 with the intention that they study medicine at Bristol University.

However, as she stated in a 1972 interview, her ambitions lay elsewhere: "I couldn't even stand the sight of blood.... I begged my father not to send me because everyone knew me as 'Meta the Musician', and I loved music." She nevertheless did spend a short time at the university, though often so engrossed at the piano that she forgot to attend lectures. So from medical studies she transferred to the Royal Academy of Music, where she trained as a concert pianist, and would eventually win acclaim playing on the stages of Wigmore Hall, London, and Carnegie Hall in New York, as well as throughout Europe and the Caribbean.

In 1923, she married fellow Trinidadian Dr Roland Cumberbatch, and after he accepted a post through the Colonial Medical Service in 1926 the couple eventually settled in The Bahamas, helping to build the country and becoming part of the black professional opposition to racism. According to her grandson Dr Peter Maynard, author of the biography Great Awakening: Meta Davis Cumberbatch, "Mother of the Arts" (2010): "There were so many artistic and cultural forms that were not being widely expressed. ...She saw her purpose as developing the arts in the Bahamas."

She taught piano, drama and dance (her protégés included Winston Saunders, Hubert Farrington, and Clement Bethel), and encouraged and promoted indigenous crafts using local materials. In the early 1960s, she originated and ran an annual national Festival of Arts and Crafts, as well as initiating the Dundas Centre for the Performing Arts. In addition to composing music, she wrote poetry, plays and essays – collected in Complete Works of Meta Davis Cumberbatch: Poems, Plays, Music and Essays, edited by Peter Maynard – and also helped to form the Council of Women and supported the women's suffrage movement.

In 1966, she was appointed a Member of the Most Excellent Order of the British Empire (MBE) "for public services in the Bahamas", and the award was presented by Queen Elizabeth II during her visit to the Caribbean in February that year.

Davis Cumberbatch died at home in the Bahamas on 29 December 1978, aged 78.

== Legacy ==
In 2014, at the 41st Independence anniversary celebrations of The Bahamas under the theme "Celebrating our Culture: A Commitment to Peace", Meta Davis Cumberbatch was one of 41 "Cultural Warriors" honoured by the Bahamian government for dedicating their lives to cultural development.

Her work is included in the 2019 anthology New Daughters of Africa, edited by Margaret Busby.
