= Eugenia Lockhart =

Eugenia Lockhart OBE
- Born: Eugenia Louise Wilson; June 17, 1908; Duncan Town, Ragged Island
- Died: c. 1986 (aged 87-88)
- Known for: Bahamian suffragist
- Political party: Progressive Liberal Party

Eugenia Louise Lockhart OBE (née Wilson; 17 June 1908 – c. 1986) was a Bahamian suffragist who was the secretary of the Bahamian Women's Suffrage Movement (WSM) and secretary of the Women's Branch of the Progressive Liberal Party.

In 1960, Lockhart, together with Doris Johnson and Henry Milton Taylor (the Progressive Liberal Party's national party chairman) went to London to argue the case for universal suffrage in the colony of the Bahamas Islands to the Secretary of State for the Colonies. Women gained the right to vote, and to sit in the legislature, in the following year. By 1967, black women had organized themselves into a voting bloc that contributed to the Progressive Liberal Party's win and majority rule in the Bahamas.

== Personal ==
Lockhart was born Eugenie Louise Wilson on 17 June 1908 in Duncan Town, Ragged Island to Horace and Helen Wilson. She was an assistant teacher in Duncan Town at the age of 12. In 1926, she married Edward Lockhart. Lockhart's exact death date is unknown.

== Recognition ==
Lockhart was appointed to the Order of the British Empire and was made Stalwart Councilor of the Progressive Liberal Party.

The Bahamian government issued a postage stamp in 2012, on the fiftieth anniversary of universal adult suffrage, to honor the women who campaigned for voting rights. Lockhart appeared on the 65 cent stamp.
