= List of Trinidad and Tobago artists =

This is a list of artists born in Trinidad and Tobago, or whose artworks are associated with that country.

== A ==
- M. P. Alladin (1919–1980)
- Sybil Atteck (1911–1975)
- Nicole Awai (born 1966)

== B ==
- Valerie Belgrave (1946–2016)
- Isaiah James Boodhoo (1932–2004)
- Cheryl Byron (c. 1947–2003)

== C ==
- LeRoy Clarke (1938–2021)
- Vera Cudjoe (born 1928)

== G ==
- Esther Griffith (living)
- Christopher Guinness (born 1981)

== H ==
- Boscoe Holder (1921–2007)
- Christian Holder (1949–2025)
- Nadia Huggins (born 1984)

== J ==
- Nneka Jones (living)

== L ==
- Amy Leong Pang (1908–1989)
- Che Lovelace (born 1969)
- John Lyons (poet) (born 1933)

== M ==
- Brian Mac Farlane (born 1957)
- Althea McNish (1924–2020)
- Wendell McShine (born 1972)
- Peter Minshall (born 1941)

== N ==
- Angelique Nixon (living)
- Norris Iton (born 1951)

== O ==
- Horace Ové (1936–2023)
- Zak Ové (born 1966)

== S ==
- Roberta Silva (born 1971)
- Hugh Stollmeyer (1912–1982)
- Shalini Seereeram (born c.1972)

== T ==
- Denyse Thomasos (1964–2012)
