= Trinidad and Tobago at the 2025 World Aquatics Championships =

- Flag of Trinidad and Tobago
- World Aquatics code: TTO
- National federation: Aquatics Sports Association of Trinidad and Tobago

in Singapore
- Competitors: 5 in 1 sport
- Medals: Gold 0 Silver 0 Bronze 0 Total 0

World Aquatics Championships appearances
- 1973; 1975; 1978; 1982; 1986; 1991; 1994; 1998; 2001; 2003; 2005; 2007; 2009; 2011; 2013; 2015; 2017; 2019; 2022; 2023; 2024; 2025

Trinidad and Tobago competed at the 2025 World Aquatics Championships in Singapore from July 11 to August 3, 2025.

== Competitors ==
The following is the list of competitors in the Championships.

Sport	Men	Women	Total
Swimming	3	2	5
Total	3	2	5

== Swimming ==
Trinidad and Tobago entered 5 swimmers.

Men

Athlete	Event	Heat		Semi-final		Final	
Athlete	Event	Time	Rank	Time	Rank	Time	Rank
Nikoli Blackman	100 m freestyle	48.86	29	Did not advance			
Nikoli Blackman	200 m freestyle	1:51.63	44	Did not advance			
Liam Carrington	100 m backstroke	55.87	40	Did not advance			
Dylan Carter	50 m freestyle	22.51	43	Did not advance			
Dylan Carter	50 m butterfly	23.36	21	Did not advance			

Women

Athlete	Event	Heat		Semi-final		Final	
Athlete	Event	Time	Rank	Time	Rank	Time	Rank
Isabella Dieffenthaller	100 m freestyle	57.05	38	Did not advance			
Isabella Dieffenthaller	200 m freestyle	2:05.58	38	Did not advance			
Zuri Ferguson	50 m backstroke	29.81	40	Did not advance			
Zuri Ferguson	100 m backstroke	1:03.56	36	Did not advance			
Zuri Ferguson	200 m backstroke	2:18.89	35	Did not advance			
