= M. P. Alladin =

Trinidad and Tobago artist and educator (1919–1980)

- Born: Mahmoud Pharouk Alladin; 1919; Tacarigua, Trinidad and Tobago, British Windward Islands
- Died: 1980 (aged 60–61)
- Education: Birmingham College of Arts and Crafts; Columbia University
- Occupations: Artist, writer, teacher and public servant
- Awards: Public Service Medal of Merit (Gold), 1969

Mahmoud Pharouk Alladin (Note: Michael Anthony and others give his name as Mohammed, rather than Mahmoud.) (1919–1980) was a Trinidad and Tobago artist, poet, writer, teacher and public servant. Alladin played a major role in the expansion of art education and was an important influence on a wide range of Trinidad and Tobago artists. He helped develop a local artistic identity, and helped legitimise rural Indo-Trinidadian life as a subject for local artists.

== Early life and education ==
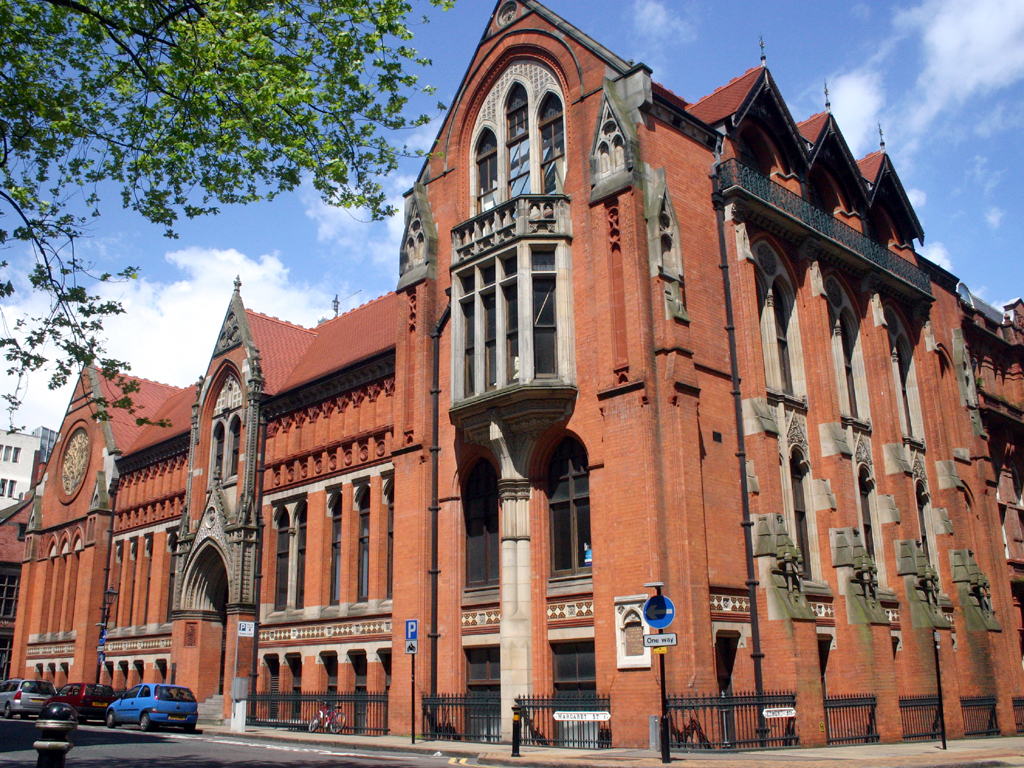
Alladin received a scholarship from the British Council to study at Birmingham College of Arts and Crafts.

Alladin was born in Tacarigua, Trinidad and Tobago, to an Indo-Trinidadian Muslim family. He was educated at the Tacarigua Canadian Indian Mission School and the Government Training School in Port of Spain. Upon graduation, he received a British Council scholarship to study in Britain. Alladin graduated from the Birmingham College of Arts and Crafts and later received an M.A. degree from Columbia University.

== Career ==
Alladin worked as an assistant teacher at Tacarigua Canadian Indian Mission School from 1938 to 1946 and as principal of Arima Boy's Government School from 1946 to 1947. Upon his return from Britain in 1949, Alladin taught as a lecturer in art at the Government Teachers' College. Alladin played a role in the introduction of art into the primary school curriculum and into community centres; he taught art to primary school teachers and established workshops for children in centres around the country. Alladin established the Art Teacher's Association and created an annual exhibition for their work.

Alladin was later appointed Arts Officer in the Ministry of Education and Culture and, from 1965 to 1979, served as Director of Culture. In 1966 Alladin was appointed by Prime Minister Eric Williams to chair a committee to look into the problems of the steelband movement.

== Style and works ==
Alladin is the first known Indo-Trinidadian visual artist. Author and historian Michael Anthony called his style "rather conventional". In Trinidad and Tobago in the first decades after independence, formally trained artists had been educated in Europe, the United States, or Canada, and the accepted form of artistic expression was, in Alladin's view, "Europeanized". As Director of Culture Alladin sought to develop and elevate the "folk arts" produced by the primarily African- and Indian-descended populations as a way to build national cultural consciousness. Alladin worked for the "liberation of the arts from overseas influences as far as expression, experiences and choice of subject matter went".

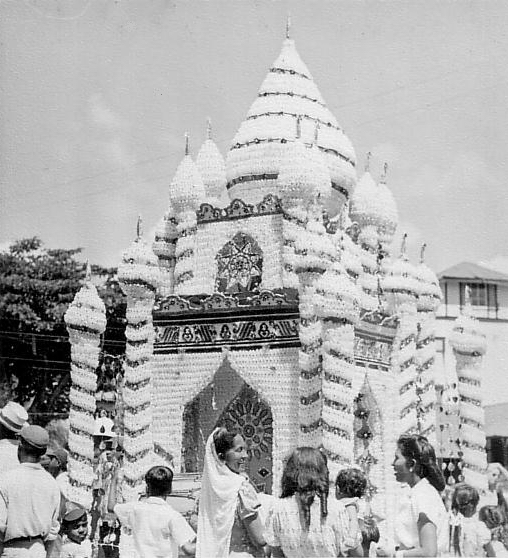
Hosay celebrations in Port of Spain, 1950s. Alladin depicted Hosay in his paintings and poetry.

As part of a group of painters which included Boscoe Holder, Sybil Atteck, Amy Leong Pang and Carlisle Chang, Alladin was part of a mid-twentieth century art movement in Trinidad and Tobago that began to be representative of the country's cultural and ethnic diversity. These artists, according to gender and cultural studies professor Patricia Mohammed, were "search[ing] for a new vocabulary of art" and were in the early stages of developing a local identity.

To mark the independence of Ghana in 1957, the Government of Trinidad and Tobago commissioned Alladin to create a work, which he called "Back to Africa" as a gift to the people of Ghana. In 1967 he produced another work as a gift to Ghana.

Alladin's work featured rural Indo-Trinidadian life including depictions of festivals such as Phagwa and work in sugarcane fields. Alladin's 1963 poem "Hosay Drums" was described by dancer and choreographer Satnarine Balkaransingh as capturing "the exuberance and intoxicating rhythm" of tassa drumming. In his 1957 painting of Hosay drummers which focuses on the hands of the drummers rather than their faces, Mohammed sees a reflection of an Islamic artistic aesthetic.

Alladin's portrayal of rural Indo-Trinidadian life in his paintings legitimised it as a subject for other Indo-Trinidadian painters who were trained in Western artistic traditions. Alladin's portrayal, according to Boodhoo, "gave a new dignity to this subject".

Alladin, who spoke Urdu, Hindi and Arabic, included words and phrases on Trinidadian Bhojpuri in his poetry.

== Legacy ==
Satnarine Balkaransingh called Alladin "the 'Guru of painters' of Trinidad and Tobago in modern times". James Isaiah Boodhoo called him "without dispute the most influential of artists in Trinidad and Tobago" because of the role he played in the spread of art education and in nurturing the development of individual artists.

Alladin was an important influence on a wide range of artists. Boodhoo considered him a key influence, as did Carnival designers Wayne Berkeley and George Bailey, and fabric designer Althea McNish.

In 1969, Alladin was awarded the Public Service Medal of Merit (Gold) by the Government of Trinidad and Tobago.
