= McShine =

McShine is a surname, and may refer to:

- Arthur Hugh McShine, Chief Judge of Trinidad and Tobago
- Kynaston McShine (1935–2018), Trinidadian curator
- Leonora Pujadas-McShine (1910–1995), Trinidadian women's rights activist and community worker
- Pilar McShine (born 1987), Trinidad and Tobago middle distance runner
- Wendell McShine, artist
