= Trinidad and Tobago at the 2024 World Aquatics Championships =

- Flag of Trinidad and Tobago
- FINA code: TRI
- National federation: Aquatics Sports Association of Trinidad and Tobago

in Doha, Qatar
- Competitors: 2 in 1 sport
- Medals: Gold 0 Silver 0 Bronze 0 Total 0

World Aquatics Championships appearances
- 1973; 1975; 1978; 1982; 1986; 1991; 1994; 1998; 2001; 2003; 2005; 2007; 2009; 2011; 2013; 2015; 2017; 2019; 2022; 2023; 2024

Trinidad and Tobago competed at the 2024 World Aquatics Championships in Doha, Qatar from 2 to 18 February.

== Competitors ==
The following is the list of competitors in the Championships.

| Sport | Men | Women | Total |
|---|---|---|---|
| Swimming | 1 | 1 | 2 |
| Total | 1 | 1 | 2 |

== Swimming ==
Trinidad and Tobago entered 2 swimmers.

Men

| Athlete | Event | Heat | | Semifinal | | Final | |
| Athlete | Event | Time | Rank | Time | Rank | Time | Rank |
|---|---|---|---|---|---|---|---|
| Dylan Carter | 50 metre freestyle | 21.95 | 11 Q | 22.01 | 15 | Did not advance | |
| Dylan Carter | 50 metre butterfly | 23.16 | 4 Q | 23.15 | 2 Q | 23.17 | 5 |

Women

| Athlete | Event | Heat | | Semifinal | | Final | |
| Athlete | Event | Time | Rank | Time | Rank | Time | Rank |
|---|---|---|---|---|---|---|---|
| Cherelle Thompson | 50 metre freestyle | 26.03 | 38 | Did not advance | | | |
| Cherelle Thompson | 50 metre butterfly | 29.58 | 41 | Did not advance | | | |
