= Trinidad and Tobago at the 2022 World Aquatics Championships =

- Flag of Trinidad and Tobago
- FINA code: TTO
- National federation: Amateur Swimming Association of Trinidad and Tobago

in Budapest, Hungary
- Competitors: 2 in 1 sport
- Medals: Gold 0 Silver 0 Bronze 0 Total 0

World Aquatics Championships appearances
- 1973; 1975; 1978; 1982; 1986; 1991; 1994; 1998; 2001; 2003; 2005; 2007; 2009; 2011; 2013; 2015; 2017; 2019; 2022; 2023; 2024

Trinidad and Tobago competed at the 2022 World Aquatics Championships in Budapest, Hungary from 18 June to 3 July.

== Swimming ==
Swimmers from Trinidad and Tobago have achieved qualifying standards in the following events.

Athlete	Event	Heat		Semifinal		Final	
Athlete	Event	Time	Rank	Time	Rank	Time	Rank
Dylan Carter	Men's 50 m freestyle	22.19	=17	did not advance			
Dylan Carter	Men's 100 m freestyle	48.40	=11	48.30	14	did not advance	
Dylan Carter	Men's 50 m butterfly	22.87	1 Q	22.98	6 Q	22.85	4
Cherelle Thompson	Women's 50 m freestyle	26.01	26	did not advance			
Cherelle Thompson	Women's 50 m butterfly	29.29	46	did not advance			
