= Trinidad and Tobago at the 2023 World Aquatics Championships =

- Flag of Trinidad and Tobago
- FINA code: TTO
- National federation: Aquatics Sports Association of Trinidad and Tobago

in Fukuoka, Japan
- Competitors: 2 in 1 sport
- Medals: Gold 0 Silver 0 Bronze 0 Total 0

World Aquatics Championships appearances
- 1973; 1975; 1978; 1982; 1986; 1991; 1994; 1998; 2001; 2003; 2005; 2007; 2009; 2011; 2013; 2015; 2017; 2019; 2022; 2023; 2024

Trinidad and Tobago is set to compete at the 2023 World Aquatics Championships in Fukuoka, Japan from 14 to 30 July.

== Swimming ==
Trinidad and Tobago entered 2 swimmers.

Men

Athlete	Event	Heat		Semifinal		Final	
Athlete	Event	Time	Rank	Time	Rank	Time	Rank
Dylan Carter	50 metre freestyle	Did not start					
Dylan Carter	100 metre freestyle	48.16 NR	10 Q	48.60	16	Did not advance	
Dylan Carter	50 metre backstroke	Did not start					
Dylan Carter	50 metre butterfly	22.89	3 Q	23.05; 23.26	8 S/off; 2	Did not advance	

Women

Athlete	Event	Heat		Semifinal		Final	
Athlete	Event	Time	Rank	Time	Rank	Time	Rank
Cherelle Thompson	50 metre freestyle	25.85	40	Did not advance			
Cherelle Thompson	50 metre butterfly	28.84	43	Did not advance			
