= Trinidad and Tobago at the 2017 World Aquatics Championships =

- Flag of Trinidad and Tobago
- FINA code: TRI
- National federation: Amateur Swimming Association of Trinidad and Tobago
- Website: www.swimtt.com

in Budapest, Hungary
- Competitors: 2 in 1 sport
- Medals: Gold 0 Silver 0 Bronze 0 Total 0

World Aquatics Championships appearances
- 1973; 1975; 1978; 1982; 1986; 1991; 1994; 1998; 2001; 2003; 2005; 2007; 2009; 2011; 2013; 2015; 2017; 2019; 2022; 2023; 2024

Trinidad and Tobago competed at the 2017 World Aquatics Championships in Budapest, Hungary from 14 July to 30 July.

== Swimming ==
Swimmers from Trinidad and Tobago have achieved qualifying standards in the following events (up to a maximum of 2 swimmers in each event at the A-standard entry time, and 1 at the B-standard):

Athlete	Event	Heat		Semifinal		Final	
Athlete	Event	Time	Rank	Time	Rank	Time	Rank
Dylan Carter	Men's 100 m freestyle	48.87	=18	did not advance			
Dylan Carter	Men's 200 m freestyle	1:47.77	24	did not advance			
Dylan Carter	Men's 50 m butterfly	23.73	19	did not advance			
Dylan Carter	Men's 100 m butterfly	52.75	28	did not advance			
Joshua Romany	Men's 50 m freestyle	23.30	=59	did not advance			
