= Trinidad and Tobago at the 2019 World Aquatics Championships =

- Flag of Trinidad and Tobago
- FINA code: TTO
- National federation: Amateur Swimming Association of Trinidad and Tobago

in Gwangju, South Korea
- Competitors: 3 in 1 sport
- Medals: Gold 0 Silver 0 Bronze 0 Total 0

World Aquatics Championships appearances
- 1973; 1975; 1978; 1982; 1986; 1991; 1994; 1998; 2001; 2003; 2005; 2007; 2009; 2011; 2013; 2015; 2017; 2019; 2022; 2023; 2024

Trinidad and Tobago competed at the 2019 World Aquatics Championships in Gwangju, South Korea from 12 to 28 July.

== Swimming ==
Trinidad and Tobago entered three swimmers.

Men

Athlete	Event	Heat		Semifinal		Final	
Athlete	Event	Time	Rank	Time	Rank	Time	Rank
Dylan Carter	50 m freestyle	22.65	41	did not advance			
Dylan Carter	100 m freestyle	48.77	16 Q	48.52	12	did not advance	
Dylan Carter	100 m backstroke	54.03 NR	16 Q	54.08	16	did not advance	
Dylan Carter	50 m butterfly	23.33	8 Q	23.37	13	did not advance	
Cadell Lyons	100 m butterfly	54.79	46	did not advance			

Women

Athlete	Event	Heat		Semifinal		Final	
Athlete	Event	Time	Rank	Time	Rank	Time	Rank
Cherelle Thompson	50 m freestyle	25.89	33	did not advance			
