= Trinidad and Tobago at the 2015 World Aquatics Championships =

- Flag of Trinidad and Tobago
- FINA code: TRI
- National federation: Amateur Swimming Association of Trinidad and Tobago
- Website: www.swimtt.com

in Kazan, Russia
- Competitors: 2 in 1 sport
- Medals: Gold 0 Silver 0 Bronze 0 Total 0

World Aquatics Championships appearances
- 1973; 1975; 1978; 1982; 1986; 1991; 1994; 1998; 2001; 2003; 2005; 2007; 2009; 2011; 2013; 2015; 2017; 2019; 2022; 2023; 2024

Trinidad and Tobago competed at the 2015 World Aquatics Championships in Kazan, Russia from 24 July to 9 August 2015.

== Swimming ==
Trinidad and Tobago swimmers have achieved qualifying standards in the following events (up to a maximum of 2 swimmers in each event at the A-standard entry time, and 1 at the B-standard):

Men

Athlete	Event	Heat		Semifinal		Final	
Athlete	Event	Time	Rank	Time	Rank	Time	Rank
Dylan Carter	100 m freestyle	49.40	24	Did not advance			
Dylan Carter	100 m backstroke	55.24	33	Did not advance			
Dylan Carter	50 m butterfly	23.67	=15 Q	23.60	15	Did not advance	
Dylan Carter	100 m butterfly	DNS		Did not advance			
David McLeod	50 m backstroke	26.54	43	Did not advance			
