= Trinidad and Tobago at the 2013 World Aquatics Championships =

- Flag of Trinidad and Tobago
- FINA code: TRI
- National federation: Amateur Swimming Association of Trinidad and Tobago
- Website: www.swimtt.com

in Barcelona, Spain
- Competitors: 3 in 1 sports
- Medals Ranked 28th: Gold 0 Silver 0 Bronze 1 Total 1

World Aquatics Championships appearances
- 1973; 1975; 1978; 1982; 1986; 1991; 1994; 1998; 2001; 2003; 2005; 2007; 2009; 2011; 2013; 2015; 2017; 2019; 2022; 2023; 2024

Trinidad and Tobago competed at the 2013 World Aquatics Championships in Barcelona, Spain between 19 July and 4 August 2013.

== Medalists ==
Medal	Name	Sport	Event	Date
Bronze	George Bovell	Swimming	Men's 50 m freestyle	3 August

== Swimming ==
Trinidad and Tobago swimmers achieved qualifying standards in the following events (up to a maximum of 2 swimmers in each event at the A-standard entry time, and 1 at the B-standard):

Men

Athlete	Event	Heat		Semifinal		Final	
Athlete	Event	Time	Rank	Time	Rank	Time	Rank
George Bovell	50 m freestyle	22.09	14 Q	21.74	7 Q	21.51	3rd place, bronze medalist(s)
Abraham McLeod	50 m breaststroke	28.26	41	did not advance			
Abraham McLeod	100 m breaststroke	1:03.47	49	did not advance			
Joshua McLeod	100 m freestyle	51.47	42	did not advance			
Joshua McLeod	50 m butterfly	24.43	36	did not advance			
Joshua McLeod	100 m butterfly	56.06	41	did not advance			
