= Christopher Guinness =

Animator and art director from Trinidad and Tobago

- Born: Christopher Marlon Guinness; 22 November 1981 (age 44); San Fernando, Trinidad and Tobago
- Education: Sheridan College
- Occupations: Animator and director
- Website: vimeo.com/cguinness

Christopher Guinness (born 22 November 1981) is an animator and art director from Trinidad and Tobago. Graduating from Sheridan College in Ontario, Canada, he has won awards in the Caribbean advertising and animation circuit.

== Career ==
Guinness has worked at two agencies: McCann Erickson and Lonsdale Saatchi and Saatchi.

At McCann Erickson he took the job title of a graphic artist, winning the 2006 Animae Caribe Most Successful Commercial Animation Award for his work on the bmobile Passion Anime (Fifa World Cup 2006) television commercial. He would later win the AAF US National Gold ADDY Awards in the category of "Animation or Special Effects Video, Film", making him the first and only Caribbean national to date to win at the final stage of the ADDY Awards.

In 2007 after leaving McCann Erickson, Guinness took the position of Art Director at Lonsdale Saatchi and Saatchi. His work on the "it matters" campaign won the Western Union's North American/Caribbean advertising account in October 2007. The "it matters" campaign went on to win six Awards in 2008 at the 9th AAATT Advertising Awards including the "Best Integrated Campaign of the Year" award. Lonsdale Saatchi and Saatchi also won 33 awards that night. Guinness won 18 awards in 2009 at the CAF ADDY Awards including Best of Show Overall for the body of work on Western Union, Best of Show Print for the "it matters" Support Ad and Best of Show TV for the Blink Olympic Television Commercial.

In 2010 Guinness's work on Volvo gained him his second AAF US National ADDY Award in the category of "Video Sales Presentation". Animal Instinct, a spot for the 2010 FIFA world Cup garnered him a 2010 Animae Caribe Best Use of Animation in the Media Award, along with three CAF Gold ADDYs, the 2011 CAF Addys Judge's Choice for Creative Excellence, three 4AAF Gold ADDYs, the 2011 4AAF Charlie Award for Self Promotion, the 7th TIAF Best Advertisement Animation Award and a Silver ADDY at the AAF US National ADDY Awards. His short film Pothound for the TTSPCA was nominated for a 2012 Vimeo Award. Its follow up Captain T&T became the first film from the Caribbean to screen at the San Diego Comic-Con Film Festival.

Guinness now owns and operates a design, film and animation agency and has served as the President of the Caribbean Advertising Federation. He has won more than 100 awards locally, regionally and internationally.

== Notable awards and selections ==
- 2006 Animae Caribe Awards: Most Successful Commercial Animation - bmobile Passion Anime (Fifa World Cup 2006)
