= Shalini Seereeram =

Shalini Seereeram (born c. 1972) is a multi-media artist from Trinidad and Tobago. Seereeram is the country's first openly LGBTQ female artist.

== Early life and education ==
Seereeram grew up in Chaguanas, where her father operated a supermarket. When she was eight or nine, the family home burnt down, and in the resulting depression, her father lost his business. The family moved to the outskirts of the town.

Praise from a primary school teacher after seeing her skill at drawing helped her "realise [she] liked art".

After finishing secondary school, Seereeram studied graphic design at John Donaldson Technical Institute in Port of Spain, which was her first formal training in art. She studied jewellery design at the University of Trinidad and Tobago.

== Career ==
=== Design work ===
Seereeram did design work for BWIA Beat magazine (now Caribbean Beat) thanks to one of her teachers at John Donaldson. After graduation from John Donaldson she worked in advertising while also submitting pieces of her work to exhibitions put on by the Art Society of Trinidad and Tobago.

=== Art career ===
Seereeram held her first exhibition in 2000 in Barbados. After this exhibition she made art her primary career. In 2002 she was invited to do her first solo show in Trinidad and Tobago by art dealer Mark Pereira. Since then, Seereeram has exhibited in Barbados, the United Arab Emirates, the United Kingdom and the United States, in addition to continuing to exhibit in Trinidad and Tobago.

== Style and artistry ==
Seereeram's visual art focuses on Indo-Caribbean femininity in a way that both "gestures toward" the dominant imagery of Indian women as either demure and traditional, or as "flashy Bollywood icons" while also, in the words of Gabrielle Hosein and Lisa Outar, "remind[ing] us to look behind them". They describe her work as showing Indo-Caribbean women crossing boundaries, while also continuing to carry more traditional female responsibilities.

Angelique Nixon considers Seereeram's work unique in its "same-sex loving representations" and in the way she works within the Caribbean aesthetic; her colour choices, design and "adornments" are specifically Indo-Caribbean, while also representing douglarisation (mixing between African and Indian cultures) in her subjects facial features which include broader noses and full lips while dressed in saris and wearing Indian jewellery.

Seereeram's work, according to Nixon, goes beyond the traditional Caribbean aesthetic which tends to focus on either "paradise" or "the exotic", instead centring Indianness in private settings. Nixon sees Seereeram's work as part of the post-indentureship work by Indo-Caribbean artists to "expand[...] the notion of Indianness". Both Nixon and Sharda Patasar, an artist and social scientist, see Seereeram's work as fitting in with other Indo-Caribbean women artists, Patasar highlight's the importance of being understood and accepted as a fully human and as a full citizen of her country, despite belonging to both ethnic and sexual minority groups.

Seereeram's style was shaped by her family's move from the centre of Chaguanas to the more rural outskirts. She describes herself a becoming more aware of nature and a sense of her surrounding "as a place where it felt folklore could be real". Her first work as a child included making necklaces out of river mud and nail polish. The rubble from her family's old home was used as fill at the site of their new home, providing Seereeram with found objects she could use and repurpose.

== Charitable work ==
Seereeram has been involved in helping people recover from disasters, and has donated several works of art to help raise money for hurricane victims. She considers this an outgrowth of her experience losing her home in a fire as a child. In 2024 she donated the proceeds from sales of her paintings to help the people of Carriacou recover from Hurricane Beryl.
