= Doron Gazit =

Israeli environmental artist (born 1953)

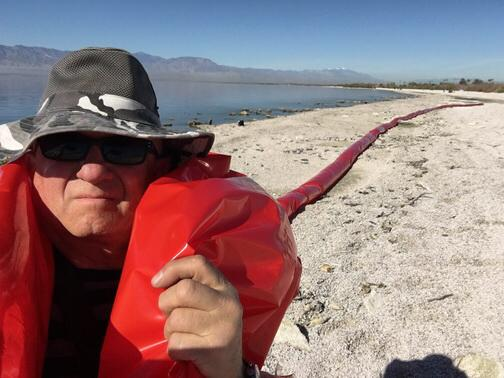
- Gazit with his art installation Red Line Project
- Born: דורון גזית

Doron Gazit (Hebrew: דורון גזית) is an Israeli environmental artist, activist and industrial designer recognized for his large-scale outdoor environmental art installations.

Gazit studied industrial design in Bezalel Academy of Arts and Design in Jerusalem where he supported himself as a street balloon artist.

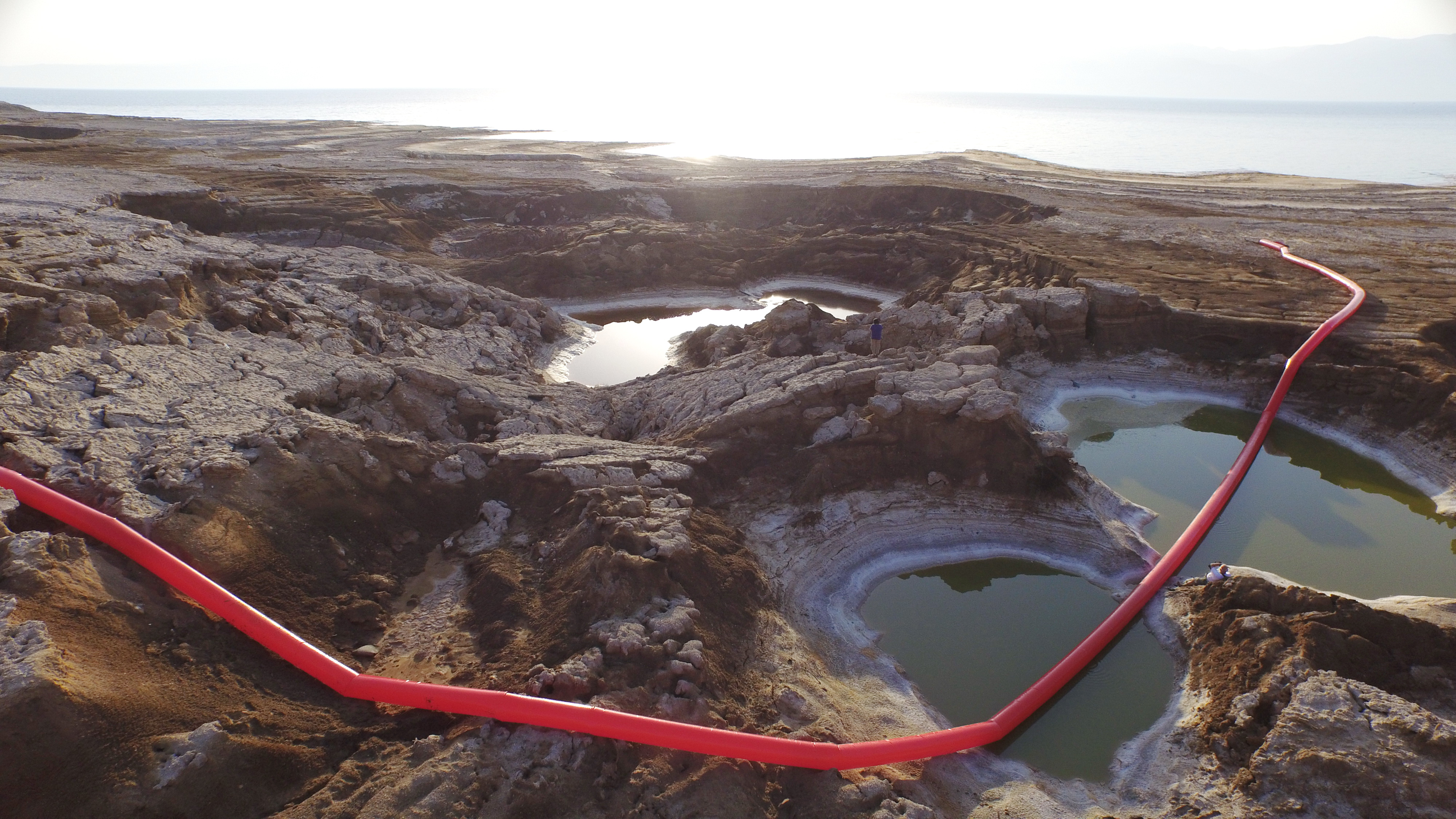
The Red Line Project (Dead Sea Sinkholes)

== Environmental artworks ==
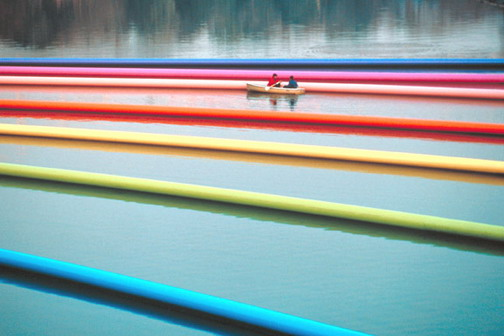
On the Asahi river, Okayama, Japan

Between 1996 and 2016 Gazit produced interactive art installations titled “Sculpting the Wind“ and “Visualizing the Invisible” in which he conceptually visualizes a dialogue between the sun and the wind using balloons and involving the participation of many people in multiple locations. According to Gazit: "The wind fills the tubes with air, imprinting its motions on the tube from inside, and guiding its way forward - creating a dialog with mother nature - a conversation with the wind, the sun and the earth beneath them."

Gazit's works are considered site specific art.

=== Red Line Project ===
Gazit's Red Line Project is a temporary art installation made up of red 3D lines at various locations that have been affected by climate change. It has been installed in the sinkholes of the Dead Sea in Israel, melting Knik Glaciar in Alaska, the Great Salt Lake in Utah, and the Salton Sea in California. He has planned future installations along the Amazon River, the forests of the Sumatra and Borneo, and the floating islands of garbage in the oceans.

== AirChitecture and Air Dimensional Design ==
Air Dimensional Design was founded by Doron Gazit. Gazit was invited to decorate nine different venues for the 1984 Olympic Games in Los Angeles. He used polyethylene air tubes as temporary architecture. Gazit is credited as a co-inventor of the dancing inflatable alongside Trinidadian artist Peter Minshall, which was developed for the 1996 Olympic Games in Atlanta.

== Gallery ==
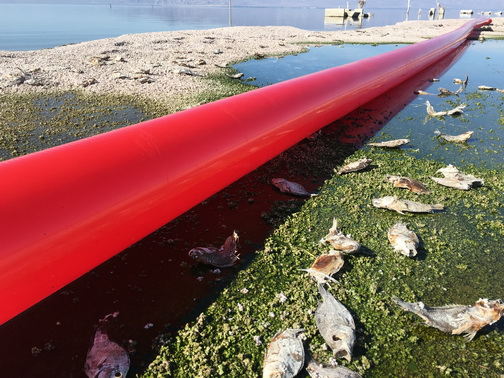
Red Line at the Salton Sea

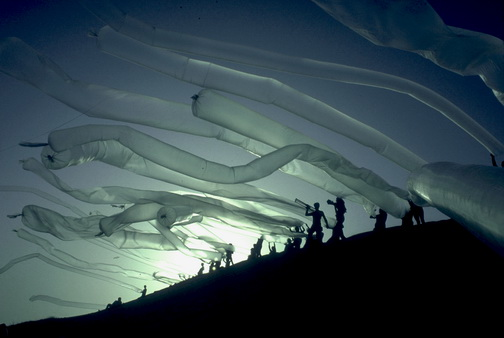
Sculpting the Wind

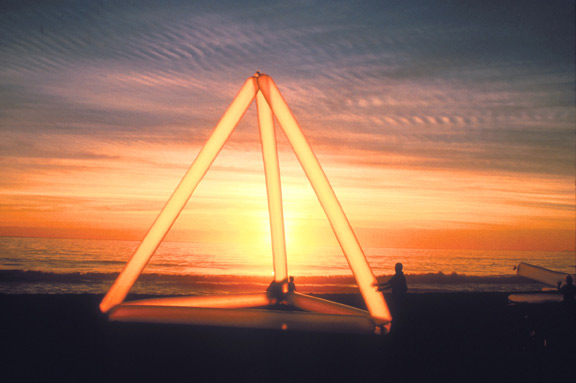
Air Pyramid

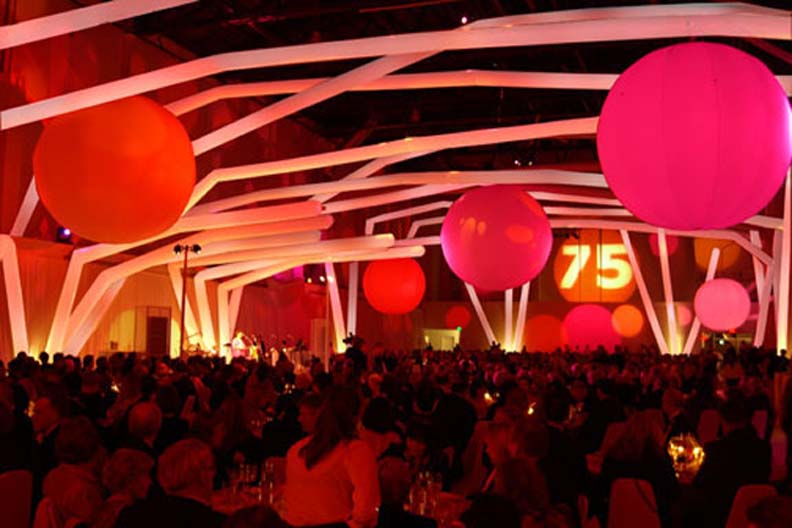
Art Center event at the Wind Tunnel

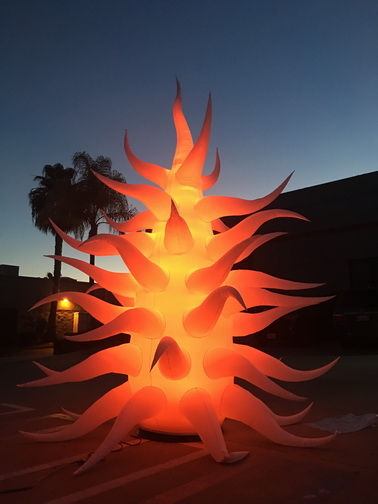
Opening of Epic Media studios

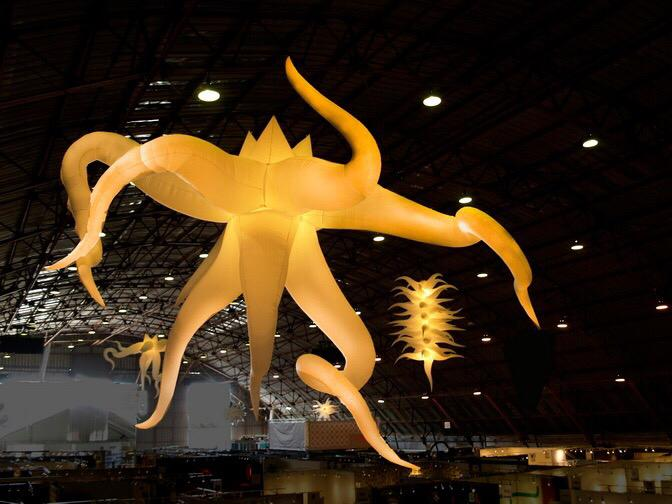
Medusa Hi-Light

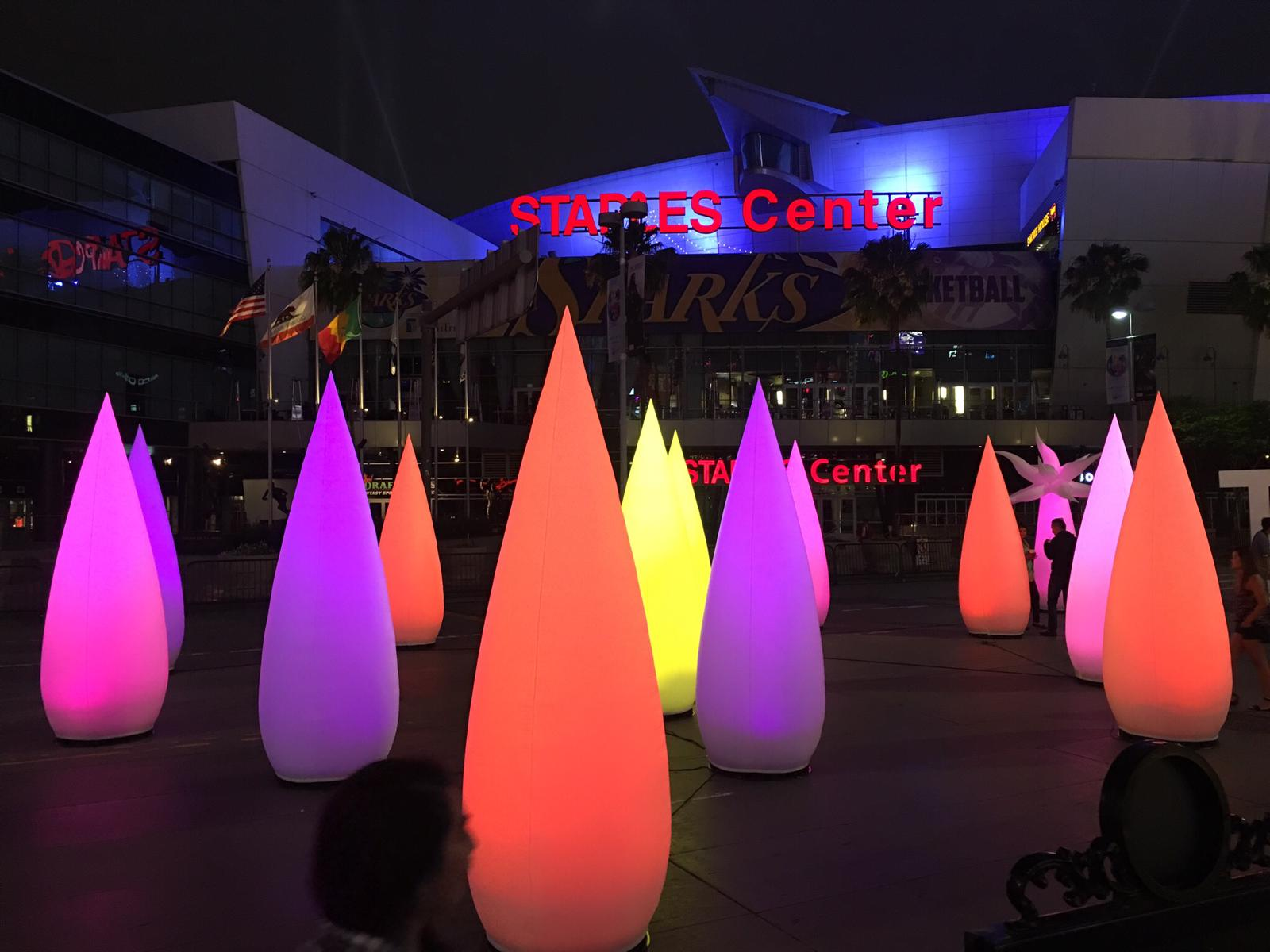
Wicks Hi-Light

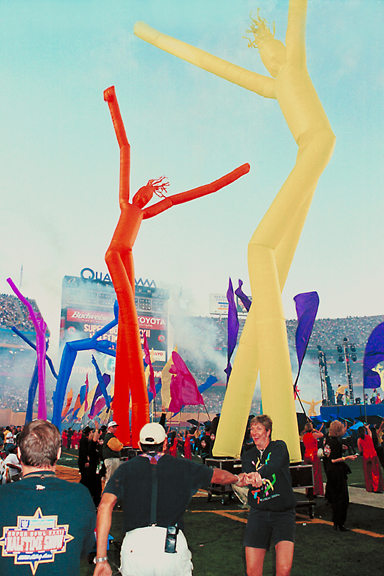
Fly Guy 98 Super Bowl
