= Carlisle Chang =

Trinidad and Tobago artist

Carlisle Fenwick Chun-Yee Chang, HBM (1921–2001) was a Trinidadian artist who designed both the national flag and coat of arms of Trinidad and Tobago. He was the country's first artist to make a living entirely from his art, and has been called the "father of Trinidadian art".

== Early life and education ==
Chang was born in San Juan. His father William Chang, an immigrant from China, was Hakka. His mother, born in British Guiana, was also of Chinese descent. Chang had two older siblings—a sister, Beryl, and brother, Wesley, in addition to a half-brother from his father's previous marriage in China. Chang's father died when he was two years old.

Chang was educated at Tranquillity Government Boys’ School in Port of Spain where he was classmates with Boscoe Holder. He received his first formal training in art from Amy Leong Pang, and joined the Trinidad Art Society in 1944. In 1945, he moved to New York to study photography. While he was in New York, "surrounded by galleries and theatres", Chang decided he wanted to be an artist.

Between 1950 and 1953 he studied art at the Central School of Arts and Crafts in London. He then spent a year in Italy studying ceramics before returning to Trinidad and Tobago.

== Career ==
The coat of arms of Trinidad and Tobago was designed by Carlisle Chang

Chang was the first Trinidad and Tobago artist to make a living solely from his art.

Chang participated in his first art exhibition in 1939, when he was 18. The exhibition, which was organised by Amy Leong Pang, also included work by Sybil Atteck and Boscoe Holder. Chang worked as a photographer with Isaac Chan, his mother's cousin. He moved to Kingston, Jamaica, and worked with his brother Wesley, who had a photography studio. After studying photography in New York, Chang worked as a photographer, mural painter, and costume and set designer until 1950, when he moved to London to study art.

In London, Chang was part of a group of West Indian artists who included Edric Connor, Beryl McBurnie, Louise Bennett, Errol Hill, Errol John, Sam Selvon and Roger Mais.

After returning to Trinidad and Tobago, Chang opened a studio and gallery where he produced paintings, Carnival costume designs, and other works. While he ran his gallery for 25 years, Chang never held an exhibition of his own work. Instead, he organised exhibitions for other artists, and often sold his work "off the easel" before it was even completed.

=== Public art ===
Between 1961 and 1964, Chang was commissioned to paint six murals, including The Inherent Nobility of Man, a 50 foot by 15 foot mural at Piarco International Airport. The mural was described by art historian Geoffrey MacLean as "possibly the most important work of art in the Caribbean". Chang also produced Conquerabia, a concrete structure on the outside wall of the Port of Spain City Hall. Other works included the Legends of the Ibis, Folk Festivals, The Story of Oil, and Lord Krishna and the Milkmaids.

=== National symbols ===
Chang, who designed the flag of Trinidad and Tobago, was "determined that a child should be able to draw it with a ruler."

In 1958, Chang designed the coat of arms for the short-lived West Indies Federation. In the three-week period leading up to the independence of Trinidad and Tobago in 1962, Chang volunteered to serve on eight separate committees, including the Design Committee which was responsible for the new country's national flag and coat of arms.

Seven artists were given the responsibility for designing the national symbols, but according to Chang only two people ended up doing almost all the work. Then premier Eric Williams, wanted "Tobago at the top of [the coat of arms", so Chang added the palm tree at the top to represent Tobago.

When it came to designing the national flag, Chang's chose to arrange the of blocks of red, white, and black with an eye to simplicity. He said that he was "determined that a child should be able to draw it with a ruler". Chang said that he considered the design of the flag that he submitted to be "incomplete". But the rest of the committee approved the design without adding anything further to it.

=== Carnival design ===
Chang designed Carnival bands for bandleader Stephen Lee Heung from 1964 to 1975. His first design was "Japan, Land of the Kabuki" in 1964. His 1966 band, "Crete", included a costume, Minotaur, which won the junior King of Carnival. His 1967 band, "China, the Forbidden City" won Band of the Year, and the Queen of the band won Queen of Carnival.

Other Lee Heung bands designed by Chang include "Terra Firma" in 1974, and "We Kind Ah People", which won Band of the Year in 1975.

=== Later career ===
Chang stopped painting in the late 1970s. His mural, The Inherent Nobility of Man, was destroyed during an expansion of the Piarco International Airport in 1979. It wasn't until 1995 that he returned to painting, and held his first solo exhibition in 1997.

== Artistic style ==
Chang has been described as "the father of Trinidadian art". His artistic style has been described as "a thoroughly indigenous fusion of the traditions of Europe with Trinidad’s folk art, coloured always by his own eclecticism". Artist and designer Peter Minshall described Chang as "among the first to understand that this place is an incredible laboratory of the New World".

== Awards ==
Chang was awarded the Hummingbird Medal (H.B.M.).
