= Leonora Pujadas-McShine =

Trinidadian women's rights activist (1910–1995)

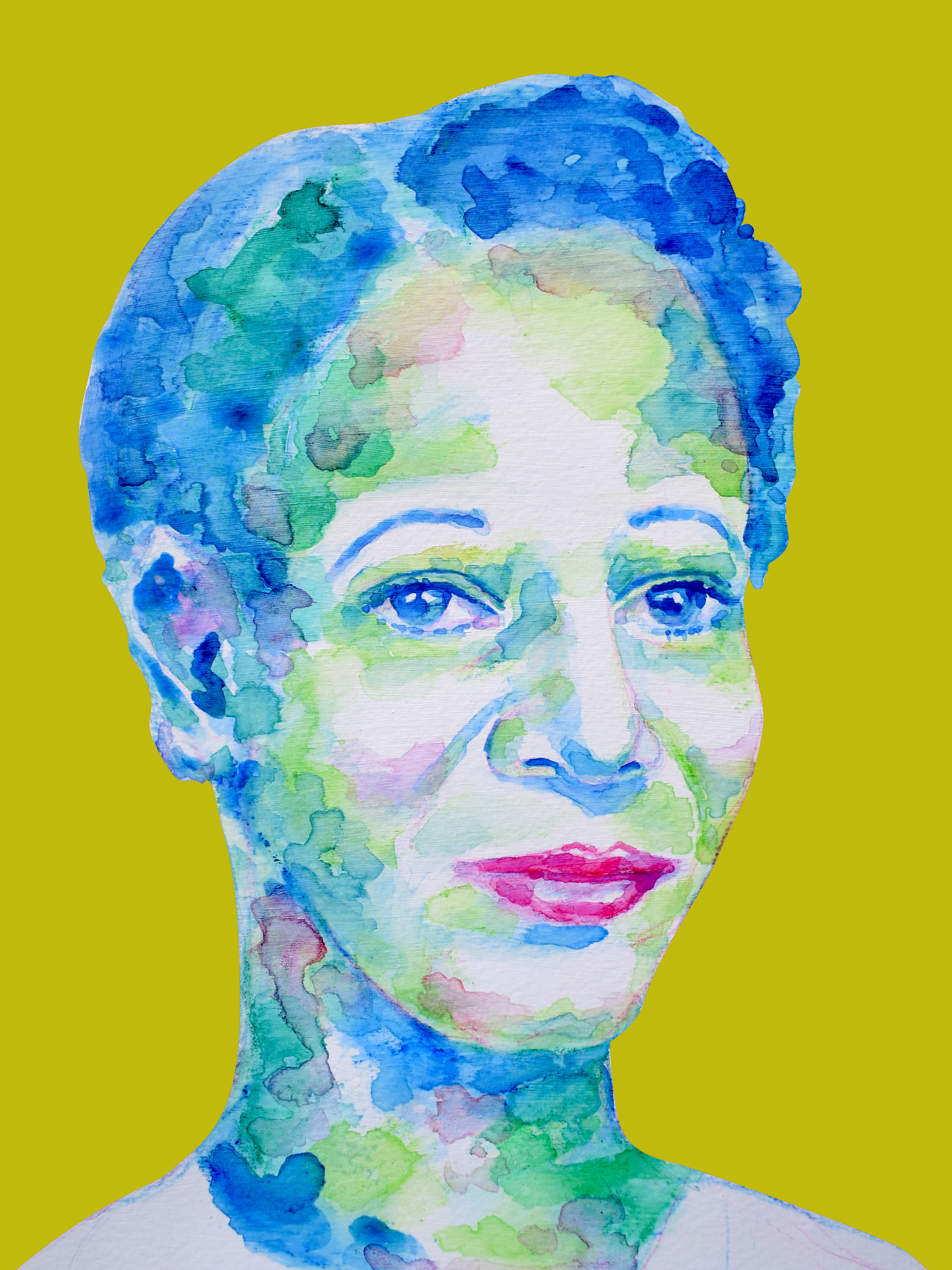
- Portrait by Esther Griffith, 2022
- Born: Leonora Pujadas; 1910; Trinidad and Tobago
- Died: 2 April 1995 (aged 84–85); Trinidad and Tobago
- Occupation: Women's rights activist
- Years active: 1946–74
- Known for: Organizing first Trinidadian League of Women Voters organization

Leonora Pujadas-McShine (1910 – 2 April 1995) was a Trinidadian women's rights activist and community worker. When Trinidad and Tobago granted universal suffrage, she established the first League of Women Voters in the country to educate women on their civic roles. She also was an advocate of equal pay and labour practices. She was posthumously awarded the Gold Hummingbird Medal.

== Early life ==
Leonora Pujadas was born in 1910 in Trinidad to Leo Pujadas, an attorney and the deputy mayor of Port of Spain. She was descended of a well-known Afro-Trinidadian family of professionals. She attended St. Joseph's Convent in Port of Spain, taking tutoring in English from Cyril Lionel Robert James at the start of the 1920s. Upon her graduation, her father sent her to England to attend a finishing school.

Completing her education, she returned to Trinidad and in 1934 married Austen McShine, with whom she had two sons: Kynaston Leigh Gerard and Arthur Leopold. Unusually for the time, she refused to adopt her husband's name and kept her maiden name. Between 1941 and 1943, the family lived in Sangre Grande, near the Waller Air Force Base during the US occupation of Trinidad during World War II. In 1946, as troops began their pull-out, Trinidad and Tobago granted universal suffrage, giving all citizens over the age of 21 the right to vote, without restriction.

== Career ==
Prior to that time, there were restrictions to voting based on property rights, literacy, and for women, attaining the age of 30. Pujadas-McShine wanted to encourage women to vote and founded the Discussion Group of Women. She recruited educated women including Berenice Dolly, a nurse, and Edith Bornn, a lawyer from Saint Thomas, U.S. Virgin Islands, to figure out how to make women more aware of the responsibilities of their right to vote. In 1949, Pujadas-McShine took what she had learned in the Discussion Group and founded the first League of Women Voters in the Virgin Islands in Port of Spain. She served as president of the organization for 14 years, creating branches throughout the country. They were not aligned politically with any party, wanting to educate women by raising their political consciousness about candidates and issues. The group also published booklets such as Knowing Your Candidate and Use Your Vote Wisely to broaden knowledge about voting processes.

Pujadas-McShine scheduled lectures and lobbied for women to be allowed to serve on juries and as political candidates. She also supported equal employment opportunities for women workers, serving on a three-member panel on the Minimum Wages Council, which also included Vincent Brown and Gema Ramkeesoon. The council evaluated industrial wages, as well as bank laundering and catering businesses. and was responsible to confirm that public or private workers were paid fair wages and that businesses were operating legally. As women began to understand their rights they joined political parties to directly lobby for their liberties. The need for the League of Women Voters declined, and it ceased to exist in 1974.

== Death and legacy ==
Pujadas-McShine died on 2 April 1995 and was posthumously awarded a Gold Hummingbird Medal in recognition of her pivotal role in women's development.
