= John Albert Bullbrook =

John Albert Bullbrook (1882–1967; born in the Medway area in what was then Kent in South-East England) was an author, archaeologist and archaeological historian, who went to Trinidad in 1913 as a petroleum geologist. He began his archaeological career in 1919, pioneering the search on the indigenous population of Trinidad.

By the early 1930s, he already provides evidence of the prominence of reflections on the indigenous history of Trinidad, and on the figure of the Carib, in some of the élites' writings of local history.

Famously in a public lecture in 1938, John Bullbrook, by then a local specialist in the Amerindian history of Trinidad, made the comment: "To this day we speak of the Queen if the Caribs at Arima, yet I doubt if there is much--if any--Carib blood in her race.".

In 1940, for a public lecture and book published under the Royal Victoria Museum and the Historical Society of Trinidad and Tobago, entitled The Ierian Race, Bullbrook wrote: "Probably, if I were to ask any of my audience this evening what was the predominant or even the only race in Trinidad at the time of the discovery by Cristobal Colon, the reply would be unhesitatingly: 'Why, Carib, of course'".

Throughout the 1940s, he conducted extensive excavations in the Amerindian middens in Cedros, Erin and Palo Seco. The Cedros site in Trinidad, which he excavated with Irving Rouse in 1946, is considered one of the most important archaeological sites in the Caribbean, consisting of a partly destroyed shell midden located on the southwest tip of Trinidad. The corrected radiocarbon datings for the finds at this site were given as 190 B.C. and A.D. 100.

Bullbrook, as a partisan in the local debate over whether the true natives of Trinidad were Carib or Arawak, lamented later, in 1960, that the "tradition" of believing that Caribs were the indigenous people of Trinidad was "deep rooted and hard to destroy".

In July 1960, Bullbrook, at the first conference in the West Indies on pre-Columbian archaeology held in Fort-de-France, Martinique, discussed his research into the "Arawaks and Caribs of Trinidad" along with the likes of Rev. Father Pinchon and A. H. Anderson. Articles of Bullbrook's have been published in magazines with a varying range of readers such as The Caribbean, Caribbean Quarterly, and Shell Magazine.

He later became curator of the Royal Victoria Institute (now the National Museum), and died at the age of 85 (in 1967).

John Bullbrook (who was the first to use modern stratigraphic techniques in Trinidad), having been educated in Great Britain, had previous field experience in the Anglo-Egyptian Sudan. His techniques represent a significant advance over the 'museological' approach that characterized the work of Fewkes (1850–1930) and de Booy (1882–1919).

His collection of correspondence with Yale University (1941–1963), with a variety of people on the subject of archaeology in the West Indies (1917–1960), with the Historical Society of Trinidad and Tobago (1939–1949); and correspondence with the Trinidad and Tobago Field Naturalists Club, have all been donated to the University of the West Indies by Carlisle Chang (in October 2000).

Bullbrook was homosexual, but was married to the lesbian painter Amy Leong Pang.

== Selected bibliography ==
- Notes Concerning Excavation Of Shell Mounds Or Kitchen Middens. Occasional Papers No. 3. Port of Spain, Trinidad: Royal Victoria Institute Museum, 1963
- "The Aborigines of Trinidad". Port of Spain, Trinidad: Royal Victoria Institute Museum, 1960.
- "The Carib-Arawakcontroversy". Trinidad and Tobago, 1957.
- "Excavations at Wari, Ayacucho, Peru and on the Excavations of a Shell Mound at Palo Seco, Trinidad, B. W. I.". New Haven, Yale University Press, 1953.
- 'The Ierian Race' (a lecture delivered at the meeting of the Historical Society of Trinidad and Tobago held in the hall of the Victoria Institute on Friday Evening 8:30 o'clock 3 March 1939). Port of Spain, Trinidad: Historical Society of Trinidad and Tobago, 1940.
- "The aborigines of Trinidad". In Richards, Alfred, comp. Discovery Day celebration, 1927
- "The aboriginal remains of Trinidad and the West Indies: A commentary on the pre-European cultures of Trinidad and the neighboring West Indies in connection". Port of Spain, Trinidad: Caribbean Quarterly, 1914.
