= Tube man =

Inflatable moving advertising product

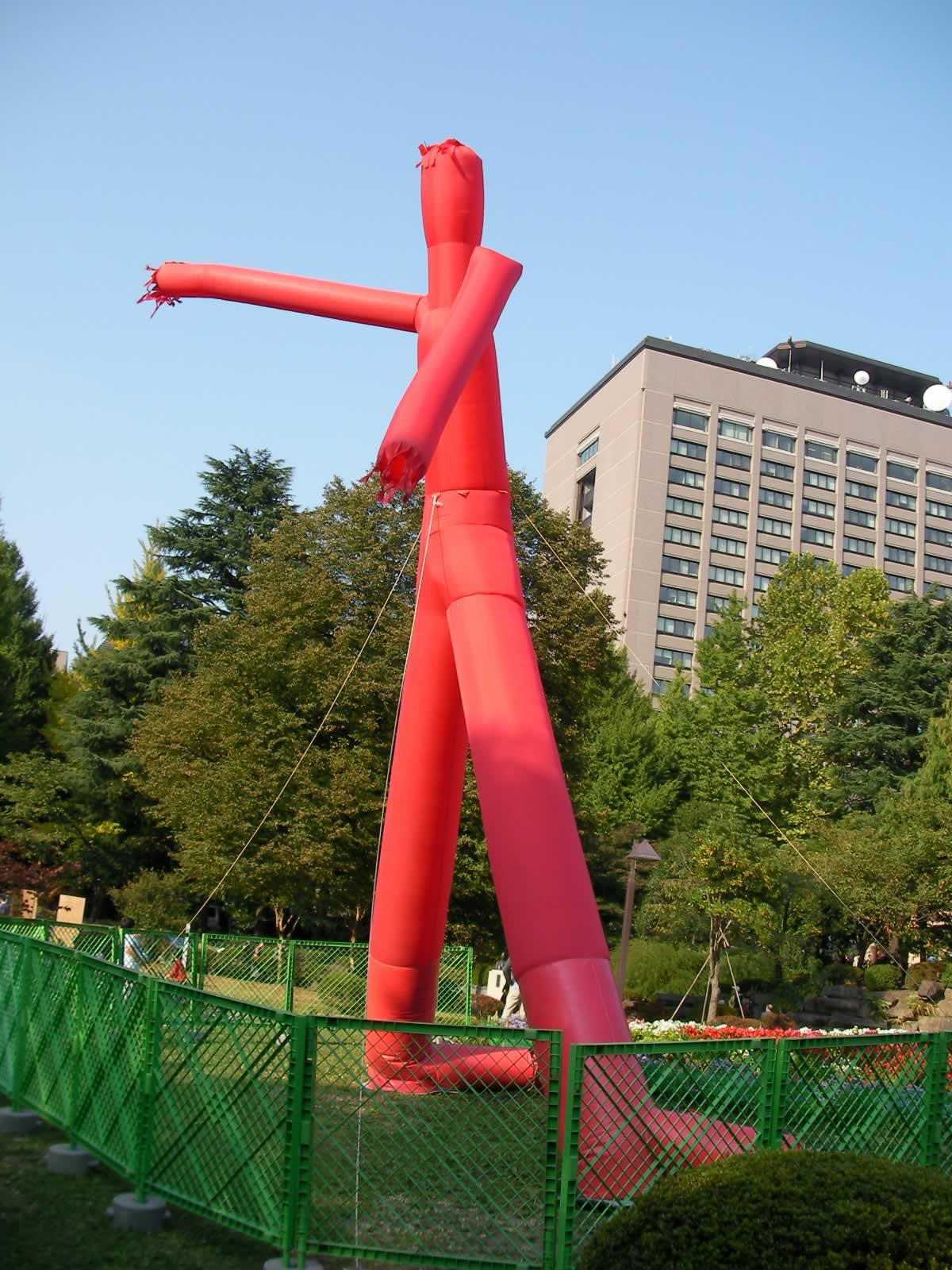
A skydancer in Sendai, Japan

An air dancer in Kanagawa, Japan

A tube man, also known as a skydancer, air dancer, inflatable man and originally called the tall boy, is an inflatable fabric stick figure that gains a dynamic dancing or flailing motion and human-like shape when air is blown through its tubing by a fan. Since the creation of tube men for the 1996 Olympic Games, they have been used to advertise retail businesses to passing motorists. They also have been used in entertainment, as well as in agriculture for a pest deterrent similar to scarecrows.

== History ==
The tube man concept was created for the 1996 Summer Olympics opening ceremony by Peter Minshall, a Trinidadian artist who sketched the idea while sitting in the bleachers of the Atlanta Stadium. Initially Minshall called the design "tall boy". He was inspired by the loose Calypso street dancers in his native Trinidad and Tobago.

He commissioned the working prototype from the Israeli artist Doron Gazit, who had more experience with inflatables, and Arieh "LouLou" Dranger, both based in Los Angeles. The 60-foot "tall boys" debuted at the Olympics. Several months later, Minshall says he was informed that Gazit had quietly begun patenting and profiting from sales of the inflatable two-legged figures. Minshall felt Gazit should have informed him. He considered legal action but ultimately decided to avoid the potential trouble and expense.

"I’m an island boy from Trinidad, I don’t know what the law is. My instinct tells me, that before he could do any such thing, it is his duty to consult with me."
– Minshall on the 99% Invisible podcast, 2014

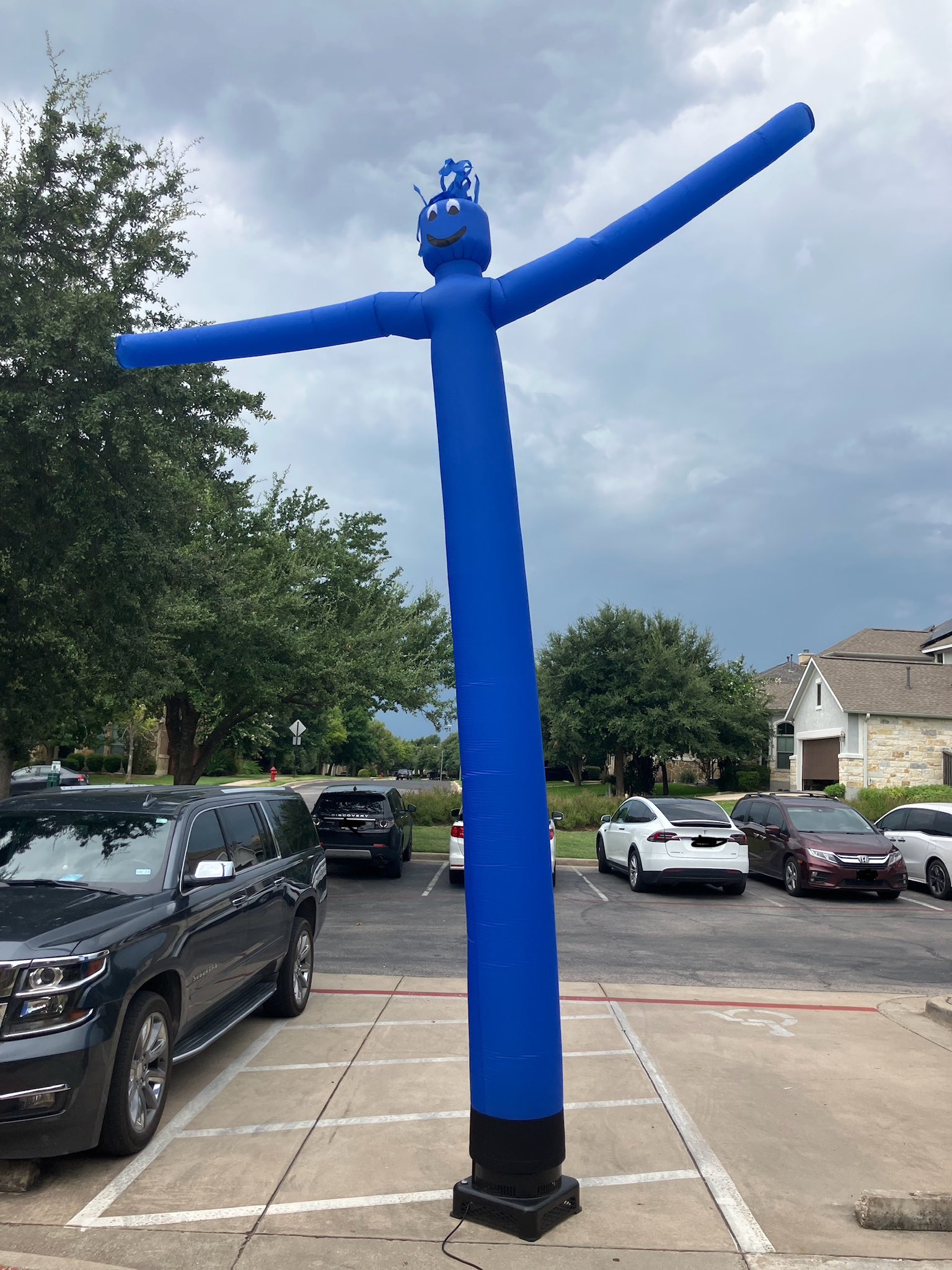
A blue tube man in Round Rock, Texas

On February 13, 2001, Gazit and Dranger were awarded U.S. Patent No. 6,186,857 for "Apparatus and Method for Providing Inflated Undulating Figures", with Gazit's company "Air Dimensional Design" listed as the assignee and the two hired artists as inventors. Gazit licensed the patent to select companies and pursued copyright infringement cases against unlicensed sellers. Because Gazit's patent specified the tube man's two legs, single-leg models became widespread. Gazit still officially licenses companies including Look Our Way, which sells the products as "Air Dancers" as well as the agricultural variation called "Air Rangers", which are customized with certain colors and an angry face.

=== Agriculture ===
In the agricultural industry, tube men have been placed in fields as alternatives to scarecrows. From 2012 to 2014, researchers from Michigan State University and Cornell University studied the inflatable tube man's effectiveness in deterring birds from fruit fields in a project funded by the United States Department of Agriculture. A blueberry farmer in Michigan said "The birds just stay away from that dancing guy. They want nothing to do with him." Homeowners in Lynn, Massachusetts have used them to deter geese.

=== Legality ===
Many municipalities have prohibited tube men and similar inflatable advertising figures due to perceived visual ugliness and risk of distracting drivers from the road. These include small to mid-sized municipalities across, for example, Connecticut and Massachusetts, as well as large cities like Houston, Texas. In 2014, the Inflatable Advertising Dealer’s Association was reportedly unaware how many bans existed.

=== Reception ===
In 2014, Minshall said on the 99% Invisible podcast that he likes when he spots a "diminutive version" of the tube man in public: "I’m suddenly aware that they’re dancing up all the gas stations all over the planet. A part of me can’t help but feel delight that goodness, little fella, look at what you and your island have given to the world." His collaborator Todd Gulick has described the unofficial versions as "an impoverished version of the device".

Doron Gazit called the single-tube variations "very ugly and very unattractive" in 2014.

== See also ==
- List of inflatable manufactured goods
