= Esther Griffith =

Trinidadian painter

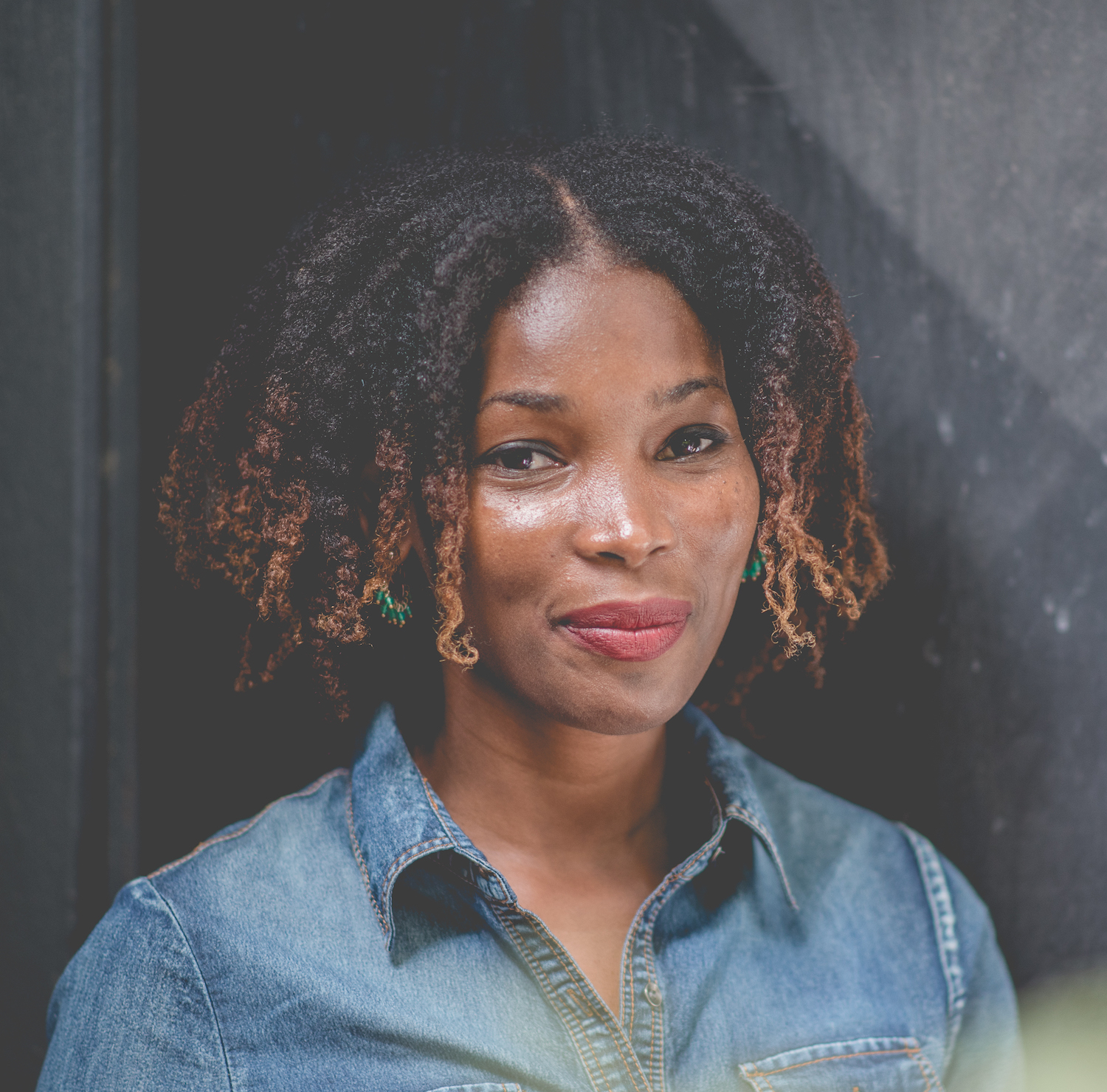
Esther Griffith in 2018

Esther Griffith is a Trinidadian painter. She mainly paints portraits.

Griffith is a graduate of the University of the West Indies. She works in oil and watercolor. Apart from painting, she also creates ceramics.

Trinidad and Tobago Guardian described one of her paintings as "radiated with an air of optimism but also reinforced a sense of shifts and motion with its energetic brushstrokes." Trinidad and Tobago Newsday states that "her paintings are usually portraits where hyper-realism is juxtaposed against the abstract."

She has made portraits for Wiki Unseen, a Wikimedia Foundation collaboration aimed at providing depictions for BIPOC Wikipedia biographies without an image of the subject. As of 2022, she lives in Trinidad and Tobago.

Griffith's art for Wiki Unseen

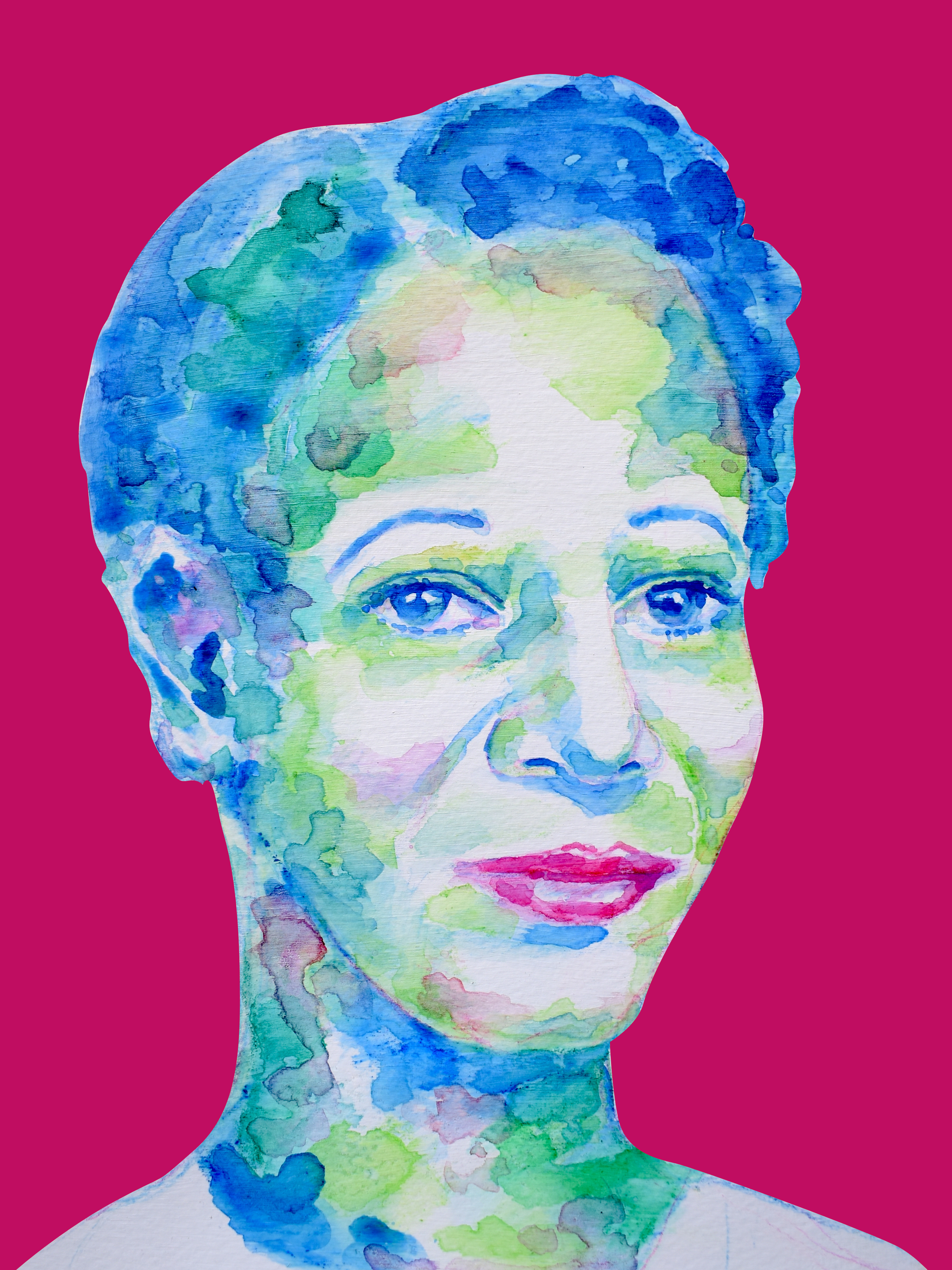
Leonora Pujadas-McShine

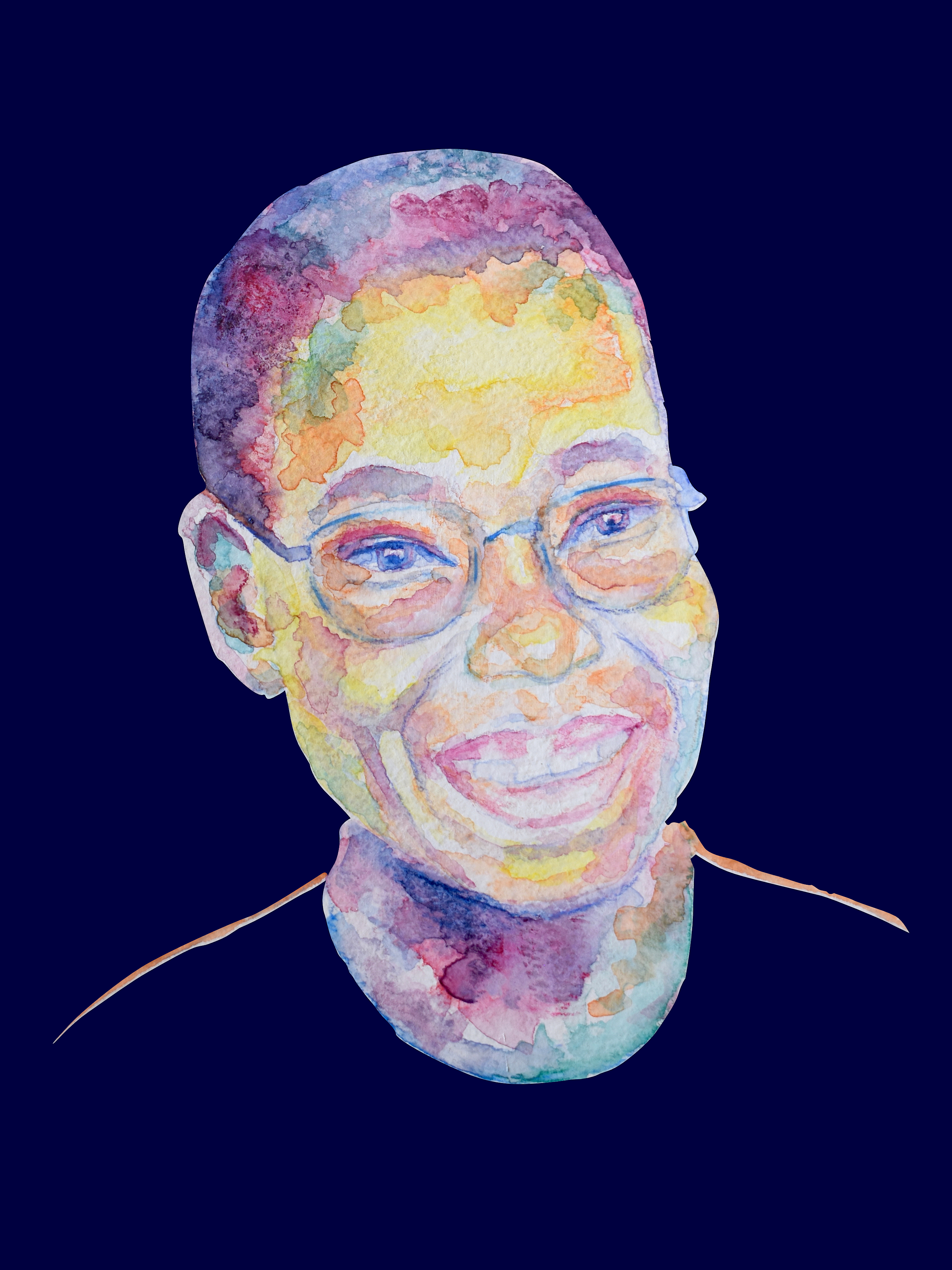
Mercedes Richards

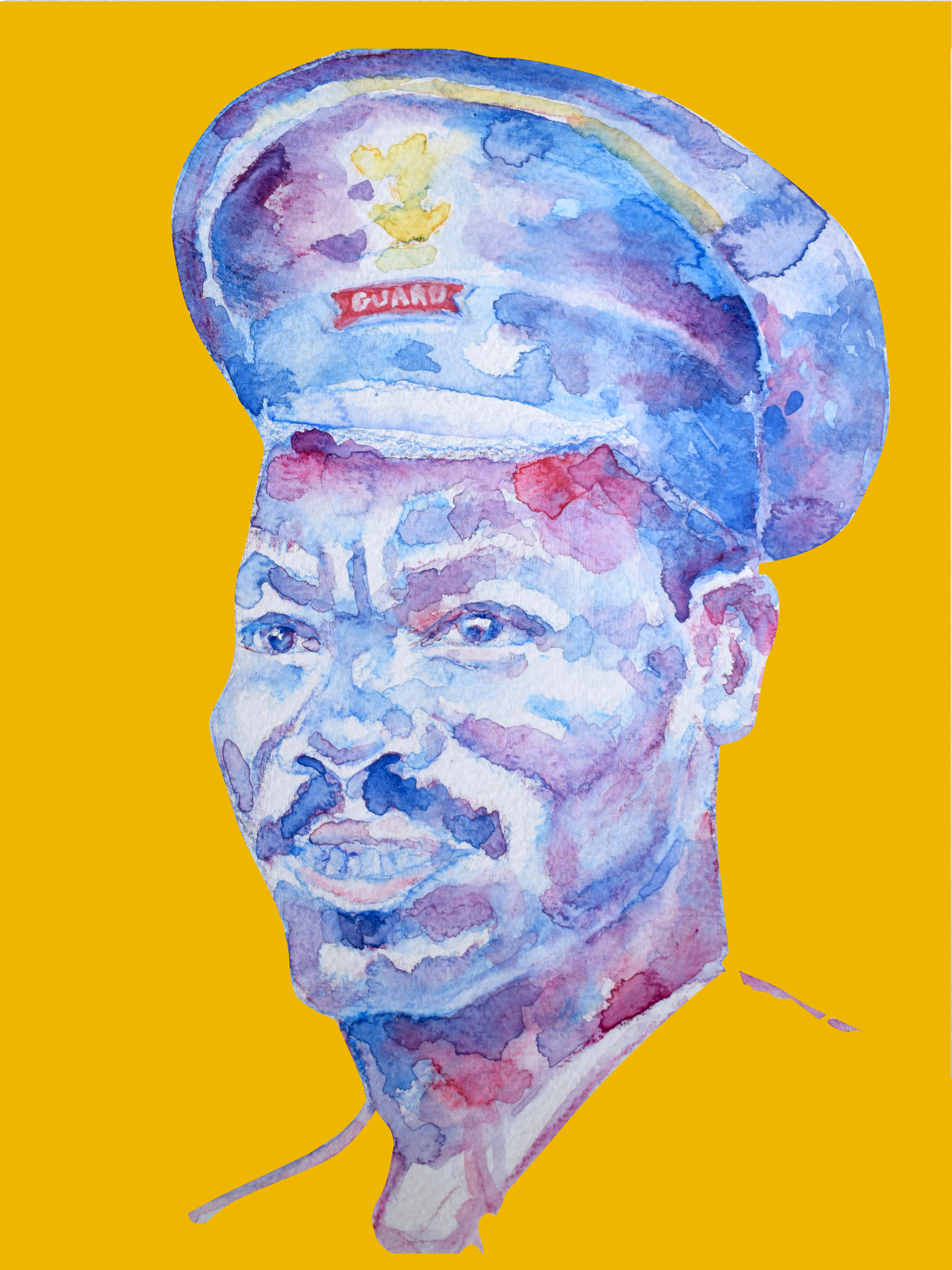
Asquith Xavier
