= Caribbean Advertising Federation =

The Caribbean Advertising Federation (CAF) was established in 1997, is the first and only non-American member of the American Advertising Federation, and is part of the 4th District of Florida and the Caribbean. The American Advertising Federation's mission is to protect and promote the well-being of advertising. This is accomplished through a grassroots network of advertisers, agencies, media companies, local advertising clubs and college chapters.

Members of the CAF take part in the ADDY Awards, the world's largest advertising competition with over 50,000 entries annually. Founded in Florida in 1960 it was adopted by the American Advertising Federation, a not-for-profit industry association, as a national competition in 1968. The ADDY Awards is unique among other advertising creative competitions in that it is the only competition that includes three levels of judging: local, regional, and national. Winning an ADDY at each level qualifies the work to progress to the next higher level.
