= Nneka Jones =

Trinidadian artist and activist

Nneka Jones is a Trinidadian artist and activist based in the United States. Her work uses embroidery and mixed media, and mainly focuses on social issues. In 2020, her artwork was on the cover of Time magazine.

== Life and career ==
Jones was born in Trinidad and lived in the Port of Spain, Trinidad and Tobago. She attended primary school at Newtown Girls’ RC and later attended Bishop Anstey High School.

Jones studied art at the University of Tampa (UT). She credits an experimental painting class she took with Chris Valle at UT, in which she was told to "paint without paint," with inspiring her to use embroidery as a medium. She made artworks with thread and other materials in that class.

In 2019, while still a student at UT, Jones won the Emerging Artist Award at the Gasparilla Festival of the Arts. She graduated from the University of Tampa in 2020 with a Bachelor of Fine Arts and a minor in marketing. She created a mixed media series of paintings titled Targets, which used condoms as part of the medium and focused on victims of sexual abuse and trafficking.

In June 2020, during ongoing Black Lives Matter protests, Jones was approached by Time magazine art director Victor Williams about creating an art piece for a Time magazine cover. Although she didn't create a cover for that particular issue, Williams reached out again to commission her for another cover in August. Jones' artwork was featured on the Time magazine cover of their August 31-September 7 special issue about racism in the U.S., titled "The New American Revolution". Her Time piece contained an embroidered American flag, left intentionally incomplete.

Jones won "Best of Show" in 2022 at the Gasparilla Festival of the Arts for her piece Modern Renaissance, a mixed media piece.
