= Berenice Dolly =

Trinidadian nurse

- Dolly in 1953
- Born: Berenice Ivyoll Grant; 11 October 1917; Pointe-à-Pierre, Trinidad and Tobago
- Died: 25 June 2002 (aged 84)
- Other names: Ben Dolly
- Occupation(s): nurse, community worker
- Years active: 1936–2000
- Spouse: Reynold Dolly

Berenice Ivyoll Dolly OBE, née Grant (11 October 1917 – 25 June 2002), was a Trinidadian nurse. She was instrumental in the development of health care on the island and a co-founder and president of the Trinidad and Tobago Nursing Association. She was honored as an officer of the Order of the British Empire in 1962 and awarded the Gold Public Service Medal of Merit of the Order of the Trinity in 1976.

== Early life ==
Berenice Ivyoll Grant, known as "Ben", was born on 11 October 1917 in Pointe-à-Pierre on the island of Trinidad in Trinidad and Tobago to Mary and Fitz-James Grant. She attended Tranquility Girls School and went on to complete her secondary education at Bishop Anstey High School, passing her Cambridge Examination, and matriculated when she passed her Senior Cambridge exams. Grant completed her nursing training in 1936 shortly before she married Reynold Dolly in 1940.

== Career ==
Dolly began working with the Ministry of Health in San Fernando, as well as a group of different charitable organizations like the Chest and Heart Association (which she founded in 1940) and the Coterie of Social Workers. Not affiliated with any particular hospital, she depended on placements from the nursing association and the government. In 1943, Reynold took a position at the Pointe-à-Pierre Hospital (PPH) as a junior medical officer. The PPH, was a private facility located in an oil refinery compound, initially run by BP, then for a time by Texaco and was nationalized when Trinidad and Tobago gained its independence, eventually becoming Petrotrin. As employees of the hospital were provided homes, the couple moved onto the compound, as the only black couple living among the oil workers. They soon had three children: Joan, Stephen and Hilary.

Dolly was not a typical stay-at-home mother, but instead, left the home every day to participate in community works. She was extremely active in nursing, pressing for legislation to register and regulate the industry. The Nurses’ Registration Ordinance No. 38, pushed through because of Dolly’s perseverance was passed in 1950. She pressed for creation of the College of Nursing, was a founding member of the Trinidad and Tobago Nurses Association, serving as its executive director for many years, and led the drive to create the Nursing Council of Trinidad and Tobago, to oversee the members of the profession.

In 1962, Dolly was honored as an officer of the Order of the British Empire for her contributions to nursing in the country. Her volunteerism and community service was further recognized the government of Trinidad and Tobago when she was awarded the Gold Public Service Medal of Merit of the Order of the Trinity in 1976.

== Death and legacy ==
Dolly died on 25 June 2002. She is widely recognized as a nursing pioneer in the Caribbean region. In 2007, Jocelyn Hezekiah wrote Breaking the Glass Ceiling: The Stories of Three Caribbean Nurses, relaying Dolly's biography and contributions to nursing, along with those of Dame Nita Barrow of Barbados and Dr. Mary Seivwright of Jamaica.
