= Wendell McShine =

Visual artist from Trinidad and Tobago (born 1986)

- Born: 23 August 1986 (age 40); Trinidad and Tobago
- Education: John S Donaldson Technical Institute; University of Navarra-Pamplona
- Known for: Painting; Mixed media; Animation
- Movement: Contemporary art Caribbean art
- Awards: Liverpool artist in residency at the BLUECOAT Award, UK (2012) * Trinidad and Tobago Film Company Award, "Art Connect Documentary", T&T (2010) * Animae Caribe Animation Award, "Rainbow Hill", T&T (2011) * Animae Caribe Animation Award, "Prosper", T&T (2010) * Belle Foundation Art Award, USA (2009) * Atlantic LNG Community Art Grant, T&T (2008)
- Website: https://wendellmcshine.com

Wendell McShine (born 23 August 1986) is a visual artist from Trinidad and Tobago. His work includes paintings, murals, animated videos and video installations. McShine has lived in the US and Mexico and founded the community arts programme Art Connect.

== Early life and education ==
McShine drew obsessively as a child. He grew up working-class in the Trinidadian towns of Tunapuna and Arima and was the ninth of ten children in his family. He said in a magazine interview: "Coming up with dignity and focus through challenging conditions in the Caribbean ghetto, the 9th of ten brothers and sisters, has inspired me to delve into the avenues of the human condition and nature. In ..the third world.., where opportunities don't come by unless you have courage, spirit and conviction has been an undercover blessing allowing me to draw from my own life experiences and giving me a huge hunger to tell multidimensional stories that inspire."

He studied graphic communications at the John S Donaldson Technical Institute in Port of Spain and was a commercial graphic artist with two national newspapers and the magazine Caribbean Beat. After being awarded a Reuters News Foundation fellowship to study Information Graphics in the UK, he attended the University of Navarra-Pamplona in Spain.

== Career ==
Currently faculty at the California Institute of Arts, school of film/video, experimental animation.

Following his studies in Europe, McShine moved to New York and worked as a bartender, becoming disillusioned with commercial art. "I really didn't want to do commercial art," he said in a magazine interview. "I wanted to have an avenue to freely express myself without limits. Becoming a painter was my true drive." While in New York he experimented with animation using the software After Effects. Leaving New York, he moved to Mexico where he found inspiration in "the colours, textures and most definitely the diversity of different indigenous tribes. My inspiration really is universal, but Mexico is where I feel alive. Everything here is on a higher vibration. It's as if there's another dimension unfolding right before our eyes and my work reflects that." He lived in Mexico City for eight years and credited that time with the development of his art: "Moving to Mexico made me into what I am. That's the place that actually started my career as an artist." After leaving Mexico, McShine moved back to the US to live in Miami

Earlier McShine took part in group shows at the contemporary art space CCA7 in Trinidad and London Print Studios but his career advanced significantly in the mid-2000s after he moved to Mexico. He expanded his repertoire from graphic art and painting to animation and his work was shown in galleries and on television. He founded Art Connect, a community arts initiative that had its pilot in Trinidad and Tobago in 2009. Art Connect continued with a further installment in Trinidad, and programmes in Liverpool and the Netherlands. The film Art Connect, directed by Miquel Galofre, is about one of the projects in Trinidad. The format of Art Connect in Liverpool included "a series of dynamic art workshops; Animation Documentation, Mask Making, Drawing and Graffiti all aimed at improving the health and wellbeing of participants, with a strong emphasis on raising the aspirations of young people."

As his reputation spread McShine was invited to exhibit and lecture in the US and Europe at various galleries and institutions which include the Kunsthal Kade in the Netherlands and the Royal College of Art in London.

== Work ==
McShine's aesthetic blends Trinidadian and Mexican influences with graphics and street art. "The main inspirations in my work are derived from investigations of fantasy, anthropology and spiritual narratives. The visual languages that are created from these inspirations result in groups of quasi-magical characters and identities. Drawings, found objects and paper cut-outs become animated films that are sometimes used to inform works on canvas, works on paper, and mixed media. There's a coherent interplay between the diverse materials I experiment with that creates the multilayered, physical premise of my work."

He said he was intrigued by "islands esthetics" of Trinidad, including "old bottle cap designs, crude sing-age typography, and carnival costumes". He uses recycled materials in his art.

== Awards, fellowships and honours ==
Wendell McShine's awards, fellowships and honours include:

- Liverpool artist in residency at the BLUECOAT Award, UK, 2012
- Trinidad and Tobago Film Company Award, "Art Connect Documentary", T&T, 2010
- Animae Caribe Animation Award, "Prosper", T&T, 2010
- Belle Foundation Art Award, USA, 2009
- Atlantic LNG Community Art Grant, T&T, 2008
- The Reuters News Foundation Next Generation News Graphic Award, UK, 2001
- TEDxYouth USA Facebook Headquarters, USA, 2013
- Universidad Iberoamericana, MEX, 2011
- Callaloo Company, "Show and Tell", T&T, 2011
- Panelist, Postopolis Art Conference DF, MEX, 2010
- The University of Trinidad and Tobago Art Department, T&T, 2009
- Alice Yard Art Space, Panelist, T&T, 2009

== Exhibitions ==
Wendell McShine's work has been exhibited and screened at numerous galleries, festivals and institutions, including CCA7 in Trinidad and Tobago, the National Gallery of Jamaica, the Museum of Modern Art Mexico, Art Basel Miami, Liverpool Biennale, and London Print Studios. He has collaborated with Adidas and Absolut Vodka.
