= Angelique Nixon =

Bahamian writer, artist, academic and activist

Angelique V. Nixon
- Born: The Bahamas
- Education: Nova Southeastern University, Florida Atlantic University, University of Florida
- Employer: University of the West Indies at St. Augustine
- Organization(s): CAISO: Sex & Gender Justice
- Known for: Feminism, writing
- Notable work: Resisting Paradise: Tourism, Diaspora, and Sexuality in Caribbean Culture, 2015

Angelique V. Nixon is a Bahamas-born, Trinidad-based, feminist writer, artist, academic and activist.

Nixon teaches at The University of the West Indies St. Augustine's, and is a director of CAISO: Sex & Gender Justice organization in Trinidad and Tobago.

She is the author of the 2015 non-fiction book Resisting Paradise: Tourism, Diaspora, and Sexuality in Caribbean Culture.

== Early life and education ==
Nixon was born in The Bahamas and raised in Trinidad.

Nixon has a bachelor's degree in accounting and humanities from Nova Southeastern University, a master's degree in English from Florida Atlantic University, and a PhD in English from the University of Florida. She also has a graduate certificate in women’s studies and gender research from the University of Florida.

She did a postdoctoral fellowship in Africana studies at New York University, focusing on migration and theories of Africana.

== Career ==
Nixon works, writers and makes art about intersectional feminism, Black liberation and decolonization.

Nixon is a tenured lecturer at the University of the West Indies at St. Augustine's Institute for Gender and Development Studies where, from 2017 to 2021, she led the Sexual Culture of Justice program that produced local and regional analysis on how to approach sexual and gender-based violence and discrimination towards LGBTQI+ people. Her teaching focusses on African diaspora literature, diaspora, migration, tourism, gender and sexuality, Caribbean and post-colonial studies.

She is a director of the Trinidad and Tobago based feminist LGBTQI+ organization CAISO: Sex & Gender Justice. In 2021, Nixon called on the government of Trinidad and Tobago to declare a national emergency on gender based violence.

== Selected publications ==
- Saltwater Healing: A Myth Memoir and Poems, Poinciana Paper Press 2013
- Resisting Paradise: Tourism, Diaspora, and Sexuality in Caribbean Culture, University Press of Mississippi, 2015, ISBN 978-1-4968-1326-8 - 2016 winner of the Caribbean Studies Association's 2016 Barbara T. Christian Award, Best Humanities Book.

== Personal life ==
Nixon is queer; she lives in Trinidad.
