= Amy Leong Pang =

Amy Leong Pang (1908–1989) was a painter from Trinidad and Tobago.

Of Chinese descent, Leong Pang was born in Princes Town and sent to school in China; she is known to have painted while there. After her return to Trinidad and Tobago she moved to Port of Spain. In 1929 she was among the founders of the Society of Trinidad Independents; other members included C. L. R. James, Alfred Mendes, Albert Gomes, Ivy Achoy, and Hugh Stollmeyer, with whom she would go on to develop a close working relationship. The group met in private homes to paint and discuss ideas, but was condemned for being bohemian and disbanded in 1938. Leong Pang would go on to help found the Trinidad Art Society in 1943.

Leong Pang was intensely private, but continued to be supportive of other local artists until her death; Boscoe Holder and Carlisle Chang are among those whose works she influenced, as well as Althea McNish. She married the archaeologist John Albert Bullbrook, but it was said to be a lavender marriage, as both were homosexual.
