= Peter Minshall =

Trinidadian artist (born 1941)

- Born: 16 July 1941 (age 84); Georgetown, Guyana
- Education: Queen's Royal College; Central School of Art and Design
- Occupation: Carnival artist
- Awards: Chaconia Silver Medal (1987); Prince Claus Award (2001); Trinity Cross (1996)

Peter Minshall (born 16 July 1941) is a Trinidadian carnival artist (described colloquially in Trinidad and Tobago as a "mas-man"). He has been the artistic director for the opening ceremonies of three Olympic Games: Barcelona (1992), Atlanta (1996), and Salt Lake City (2002).

== Early life ==
Peter Minshall was born in Georgetown, Guyana on 16 July 1941. He moved to Trinidad as a small child after his father took a job as a cartoonist. Growing up in Port of Spain, Minshall was exposed to Carnival from a young age. He made his first costume at the age of 13. He attended Queen's Royal College, then went on to study Theatre Design at the Central School of Art and Design in London.

Minshall designed Carnival costumes for relatives and family friends while in school. At art school, he wrote a thesis about the bat (a traditional Carnival character). His first major theatrical commission, for a production at Sadler's Wells, came after a director saw a portfolio of his Carnival designs.

Minshall's mother asked him to create a costume for his adopted sister Sherry-Ann Guy (Coelho) to wear for carnival 1974, the pivotal event in Minshall's Carnival career. The costume he created was called "From the Land of the Hummingbird". According to him, it took five weeks, 12 people and 104 feathers, each made of 150 different pieces of fabric.

== 1996 Olympics and dancing inflatables ==
Minshall designed the art and sculptures for the 1996 Olympics in Atlanta, Georgia, USA, and along with Israeli artist Doron Gazit is generally credited as the co-inventor of the tube man, which was prominently featured in the design for the Games.

== Awards ==
- Guggenheim Fellowship (1982)
- Chaconia Silver Medal (1987)
- Doctor of Letters, Honoris Causa – from the University of the West Indies (1991)
- Prince Claus Award (2001)
- Republic Day Award (2005)
- Trinity Cross (1996)

=== Band of the Year titles ===
- Paradise Lost (1976)
- Carnival of the Sea (1979)
- Jungle Fever (1981)
- Carnival Is Colour (1987)
- Hallelujah (1995)
- Song of the Earth (1996)
- Tapestry (1997)
- The Sacred Heart (2006; medium-size bands category)
- Mas Pieta (2020)
