= Sybil Atteck =

- Born: Sybil Marjory Atteck; 3 February 1911; Tableland, Princes Town region, Trinidad and Tobago
- Died: 15 April 1975 (aged 64); Trinidad
- Known for: Watercolour painting

Sybil Marjory Atteck (3 February 1911 − 15 April 1975) was a pioneering Trinidadian painter known for her work in watercolor, oils, ceramics, acrylics and mixed media. She is celebrated as Trinidad and Tobago's "first outstanding female painter", "first Great Woman Painter", and was the inspiration for, and a founding member, of the Trinidad Art Society, now known as The Art Society of Trinidad and Tobago, the oldest established art organization in the Caribbean.

== Biography ==
Sybil Atteck was born on 3 February 1911 on her grandfather's cocoa estate at Tableland, Princes Town Region, South Trinidad. The Atteck family moved to Rio Claro in 1913 to the family's new home there. Two miles east of Rio Claro the Atteck family owned a large cocoa estate that was the prime source of income for the family. The family were actively involved in artistic endeavors with the encouragement of their mother. The elder Atteck daughters were home schooled in Rio Claro. Atteck moved with her two elder sisters to Port of Spain when she was 12 years old to attend formal school. There, she attended St. Rose's Intermediate School in Form 1 and later transferred to Bishop Anstey High School, graduating in 1928. In January 1930 she joined the Botanical Department of the Ministry of Agriculture, where she worked as a cartographer and scientific illustrator. Atteck also was painting at home at that time and she produced a number of renderings of flora. Some of these were exhibited by the Society of Trinidad Independents in 1930.

In 1935, Atteck travelled to England, to study at the Regent Street Polytechnic in London. Upon her return to Trinidad she resumed her former position. Atteck travelled again to study, in 1941 to study art at the Escuela de Bellas Artes in Lima. Then from 1945 to 1948 studied in the United States of America where she attended the School of Fine Arts, Washington University, and obtained a Bachelor of Fine Arts degree. At university she studied with Max Beckmann, whose ideas were to have a profound effect on her work.

Stylistically, Atteck evolved her artistic styles as she encountered different instructors and stylistic formes of expression. After her return from North America she developed an expressionist style and this remained a prominent feature of her art for much of her career. Sybil Atteck exerted a great deal of influence on her contemporaries; Carlisle Chang, Willi Chen, Leo Glasgow, Althea McNish and Nina Squires are among the artists influenced by her work. In 1943 Atteck was a founding member of the Art Society of Trinidad and Tobago.

Having begun treatment for cancer in 1969, Atteck died in 1975.

== Legacy ==
In April 2011 the exhibition Women and Art — A Journey to the Past, Perspectives on the Future that opened at Trinidad's National Museum and Art Gallery, marking 100 years of International Women’s Day, was dedicated to Sybil Atteck on the centenary of her birth, and her painting Indian Festival was reproduced on the catalogue cover.

== Online images ==
An online catalog of all of Sybil's known works is now available."Sybil Atteck Biography Project".
