= Althea McNish =

Textile designer

Althea McNish CM FSCD
- Born: Althea Marjorie McNish; 15 May 1924; Port of Spain, Trinidad and Tobago
- Died: 16 April 2020 (aged 95); London
- Education: London School of Printing and Graphic Arts; Central School of Arts and Crafts; Royal College of Art
- Known for: Textile design
- Movement: Caribbean Artists Movement
- Spouse: John Weiss (1959–2018, his death)
- Website: Althea McNish & John Weiss at the Wayback Machine (archived 10 September 2019)

Althea McNish CM FSCD (1924–2020) was an artist from Trinidad who became the first Black British textile designer to earn an international reputation.

Born in Trinidad, McNish moved to Britain in the 1950s. She was associated with the Caribbean Artists Movement (CAM) in the 1960s, participating in CAM's exhibitions and seminars and helping to promote Caribbean arts to a British public. Her work is represented in the collections of the Victoria and Albert Museum, the Whitworth Museum, the Philadelphia Museum of Art, the Museum of Domestic Design and Architecture and the Cooper-Hewitt (Smithsonian Design Museum), among other places.

McNish was a Fellow of the Chartered Society of Designers. She was married to the jewellery designer John Weiss (1933–2018).

== Background ==
=== Early years ===
Althea Marjorie McNish was born in Port of Spain, Trinidad, on 15 May 1924. Her father, the writer Joseph Claude McNish, was descended from the Merikin settlers in Trinidad. She painted as a child, helped with her mother's dressmaking business by doing sketches, was a junior member of the Trinidad Arts Society and had her first exhibition at the age of 16. Her influences included local artists Sybil Atteck, Amy Leong Pang and Boscoe Holder, and European modernists such as Vincent van Gogh.

=== Move to London ===
In 1951, McNish moved with her mother to London to join her father there. She already had a place to study at the Architectural Association School of Architecture in Bedford Square but instead took courses at the London School of Printing and Graphic Arts, the Central School of Arts and Crafts and the Royal College of Art. In her final year at the London School of Printing and Graphic Arts, she became interested in textiles with the encouragement of Eduardo Paolozzi, and chose printed textiles as her subject of study on progressing to the Royal College of Art, where her talent was recognised by Hugh Casson.

On graduating, she immediately won a commission from Arthur Stewart-Liberty, head of the Liberty department store, sending her the same day by taxi to Zika Ascher, who commissioned her to design a collection for Dior. Designing for such clients, McNish was the first Caribbean woman to gain recognition in this field.

In 1966, McNish designed fabrics for the official wardrobe of Elizabeth II's during the Queen's visit to Trinidad.

She took part in the art exhibitions of the Caribbean Artists Movement (CAM) held in 1967, May 1968 and January 1971, exhibiting textiles as well as "plastic panels in laminate". For the Caribbean edition of the BBC TV magazine programme Full House, produced by John La Rose and transmitted on 3 February 1973, she brought together the work of CAM visual artists as a studio setting for CAM writers, musicians and film-makers. More recently, her work — represented by three printed textiles from early in her career: Golden Harvest, Pomegranate and Fresco — was featured in the exhibition RCA Black: Past, Present & Future (31 August–6 September 2011), organised by the Royal College of Art in collaboration with the African and African-Caribbean Design Diaspora (AACDD) to celebrate art and design by African and African-Caribbean graduates.

=== Marriage with John Weiss ===
In 1969, McNish married John Weiss, architect, jeweller and historian, and worked in partnership with him from 1971. They were in conversation with John La Rose on 2 February 1999 as part of the Building Britannia: Life Experience With Britain series held at New Beacon Books (other participants included Dennis Bovell, Gus John, Rev. Wilfred Wood, Aggrey Burke, Yvonne Brewster, and Alexis Rennie).

At the time of Weiss's death in 2018, Jake Leith, former president of the Chartered Society of Designers, said: "John and Althea were great ambassadors for the UK Fashion and Textile Design Sector."

McNish died in April 2020, at Spring Lane nursing home in Muswell Hill.

== Notable designs ==
Most of McNish's designs are based on nature though some use abstract themes, occasionally geometric. One of her first designs to go into production, Golden Harvest in 1957, was a screen print on cotton satin, later manufactured by Hull Traders (for whom she also created eight other patterns), the design being based on an Essex wheatfield but using tropical colours. A number of her early designs including Tropic, a dress fabric printed on silk and produced by Zika Ascher in 1959, and Gilia, a cotton furnishing fabric featuring tropical foliage in green and gold, produced by Hull Traders in 1961, are in the textile collection at the Victoria & Albert Museum. Also in 1959, for a commission by the Design Research Unit for the new SS Oriana, which was launched in November 1959 and was the last of the Orient Steam Navigation Company's ocean liners, she produced murals for two restaurants, Rayflower and Pineapples and pomegranates, laminated into Warerite plastic panels, a line later pursued by Perstorp Group. The 1960 modernisation of the interior of the Port of Spain General Hospital, Trinidad, by the architects Devereux and Davies, included murals by McNish.

In 1997, reviewing the exhibition Transforming the Crown: African, Asian and Caribbean Artists in Britain, 1966–1996, in which McNish participated at the Studio Museum in Harlem, New York, with other CAM artists, The New York Times reported that she "produces abstract, geometric fabric designs inspired by African motifs".

In 2018, McNish was named in Architectural Digest as one of "Five Female Designers Who Changed History" (alongside Maija Isola, Norma Merrick Sklarek, Muriel Cooper, and Denise Scott Brown).

McNish featured in the 2018 BBC Four documentary film Whoever Heard of a Black Artist? Britain's Hidden Art History, in which Brenda Emmanus followed Sonia Boyce and a team she led in preparing an exhibition at Manchester Art Gallery, focusing on artists of African and Asian descent who have played a part in shaping the history of British art.

== Legacy ==
In 2022, a major retrospective of her work, entitled Althea McNish: Colour is Mine, was mounted (2 April–11 September 2022) at the William Morris Gallery in Walthamstow, east London, sponsored by Liberty Fabrics. Co-curator Rosie Sinclair of Goldsmiths, University of London, observes: "Perhaps following this exhibition people will take another look at furnishings and fashion fabrics and wonder why colour became such an important part of new design taste in post-modern society and think about the individuals, a design pioneer such as Althea, who made this happen." Sinclair has also said: "She's a rare Black woman within international textile history. She broke boundaries." Coinciding with the exhibition, Liberty Fabrics reissued a capsule collection of McNish's original designs.

On 15 May 2023, coinciding with the 99th anniversary of her birth, a blue plaque was unveiled in her honour at her former home on West Green Road in Tottenham.

== Selected exhibitions ==
Solo exhibitions

- 1958: Althea McNish. Woodstock Gallery, London.
- 1982: Althea McNish. People's Gallery, London.
- 1997: Althea McNish. Hockney Gallery, Royal College of Art, London.
- 2003: Althea McNish: My World of Colour: The international work and inspirations of a Black British Trinidadian textile designer. Ohio University, Athens, USA.
- 2022: Althea McNish: Colour is Mine. William Morris Gallery, London.
- 2023: Althea McNish: Colour is Mine. University of Manchester, Whitworth Art Gallery, Manchester.

Group exhibitions

- 1961: Paintings by Trinidad and Tobago Artists. Commonwealth Institute, London.
- 1967: Caribbean Artists Movement. Theatre Royal, Stratford.
- 1968: Caribbean Artists Movement. Digby Stuart College, House of Commons of the United Kingdom and London School of Economics, London.
- 1971: Caribbean Artists in England. Commonwealth Institute, London.
- 1975: Caribbean Women Artists Exhibition. Olympia International Arts Centre, Kingston, Jamaica.
- 1978: Afro-Caribbean Art. Artists Market, London, organised by Drum Arts Centre.
- 1978: The Way We Live Now. Victoria & Albert Museum, London.
- 1981: INDIGO '81 International Exhibition. Indigo, Lille, France.
- 1982: Commonwealth Festival Exhibition. Brisbane, Australia.
- 1986: Make or Break. Henry Moore Gallery, London.
- 1996: Caribbean Connection 2: Island Pulse. Islington Arts Factory, London.
- 1997: Transforming the Crown: African, Asian & Caribbean Artists in Britain, 1966–1996. Caribbean Cultural Center, Studio Museum in Harlem, and Bronx Museum of the Arts, New York.
- 1997: Trinidad and Tobago Through the Eye of the Artist: From Cazabon to the New Millennium 1813–2000. Commonwealth Institute, London. Exhibition in celebration of the 35th anniversary of independence of the Republic of Trinidad and Tobago.
- 1998: Six into One: Artists from the Caribbean. Morley Gallery, London.
- 2007: Trade and Empire: Remembering Slavery. Whitworth Art Gallery, University of Manchester, Manchester.
- 2011: RCA Black. Royal College of Art, London.
- 2019: Get Up, Stand Up Now. Somerset House, London.

== Awards and accolades ==
- 1976: Chaconia Medal (Gold), Republic of Trinidad and Tobago, "for long and meritorious service to art and design"
- 1988: Scarlet Ibis Award, Trinidad and Tobago High Commission, London
- 2006: Honorary Doctor of Fine Art, University of Trinidad and Tobago
- 2008: Journalist Angela Cobbinah described her as "immediately influential, helping to establish new furnishing trends as well as inspire more adventurous fashion designers further down the line like Zandra Rhodes."
- 2012: Jubilee Gala Award for Achievement in the Arts at the UK High Commission of Trinidad and Tobago, celebrating the 50th anniversary of independence.
