= Cherelle Thompson =

Trinidad and Tobago swimmer (born 1992)

Personal information
- Born: 14 May 1992 (age 34) Port of Spain

Sport
- Sport: Swimming
- College team: University of Tennessee
Medal record
Women's swimming
Representing Trinidad and Tobago
Central American and Caribbean Games
Bronze medal – third place	2023 San Salvador	50 m freestyle

Cherelle Thompson (born 14 May 1992) is a Trinidad and Tobago swimmer.

== Career ==
In 2011, she competed in the women's 50 metre freestyle event at the World Aquatics Championships held in Shanghai, China. She did not advance to compete in the semi-finals.

She represented Trinidad and Tobago at the 2019 World Aquatics Championships held in Gwangju, South Korea. She competed in the women's 50 metre freestyle event. She did not advance to compete in the semi-finals.

She competed in the women's 50 metre freestyle event at the 2020 Summer Olympics held in Tokyo, Japan.

== Personal life ==
She studied at the University of Tennessee in Knoxville, Tennessee, United States.
