= Trinidad and Tobago at the 2011 World Aquatics Championships =

Sporting event delegation

Flag of Trinidad and Tobago

Trinidad and Tobago competed at the 2011 World Aquatics Championships in Shanghai, China between July 16 and 31, 2011.

== Swimming ==
Trinidad and Tobago qualified 3 swimmers.

Men

Athlete	Event	Heats		Semifinals		Final	
Athlete	Event	Time	Rank	Time	Rank	Time	Rank
George Bovell	Men's 50m Freestyle	22.03	3 Q	22.02	6 Q	22.04	7
Joshua McLeod	Men's 50m Butterfly	24.41	29	did not advance			
Joshua McLeod	Men's 100m Butterfly	55.80	45	did not advance			

Women

Athlete	Event	Heats		Semifinals		Final	
Athlete	Event	Time	Rank	Time	Rank	Time	Rank
Cherelle Thompson	Women's 50m Freestyle	27.21	42	did not advance			
