= Flag of Trinidad and Tobago =

Republic of Trinidad and Tobago
- Flag of the Republic of Trinidad and Tobago; The Sun-Sea-Sand Banner
- Use: National flag
- Proportion: 3:5
- Adopted: 31 August 1962; 64 years ago
- Design: A red field with a white-fimbriated black diagonal band from the upper hoist-side to the lower fly-side.
- Designed by: Carlisle Chang
- Civil ensign of the Republic of Trinidad and Tobago
- Use: Civil and state ensign
- Proportion: 1:2
- Design: A red field with a white-edged black diagonal band from the upper hoist-side to the lower fly-side.
- Naval ensign of the Republic of Trinidad and Tobago
- Use: Naval ensign
- Proportion: 1:2
- Design: A White Ensign with the National Flag in the canton

The flag of Trinidad and Tobago was adopted upon independence from the United Kingdom on 31 August 1962. Designed by Carlisle Chang (1921–2001), the flag of Trinidad and Tobago was chosen by the independence committee of 1962. Red, black and white symbolise fire (the sun, representing courage), earth (representing dedication) and water (representing purity and equality).

It is one of the few national flags incorporating a diagonal line (heraldic bend), with other examples including the DR Congo, Tanzania, Namibia, and Brunei.

== Design ==
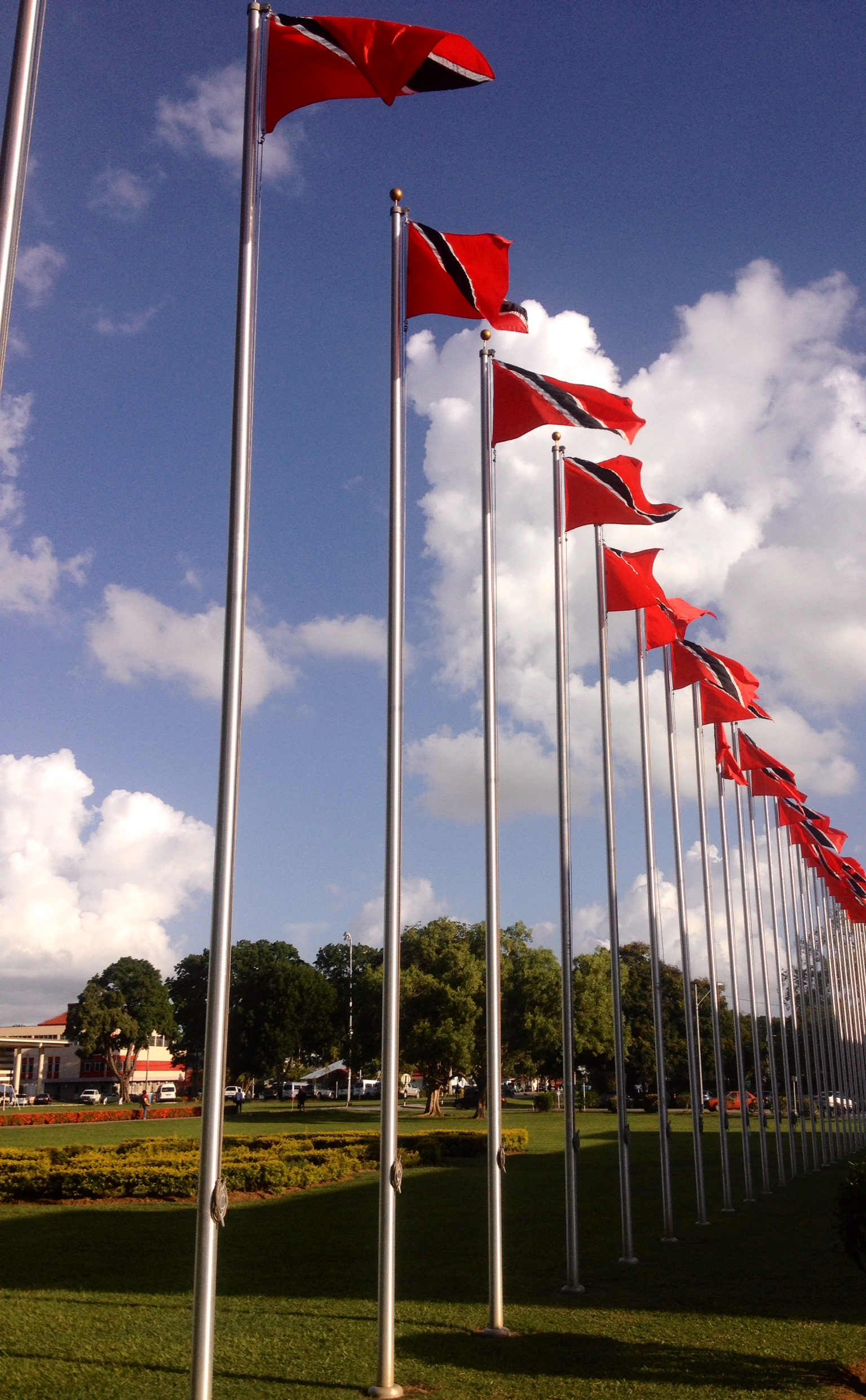
Trinidadian flags flying at the University of the West Indies in Saint Augustine, Trinidad and Tobago

The flag of Trinidad and Tobago is a red field with a white-edged black diagonal band from the upper hoist side to the lower fly-side. In blazon, Gules, a bend Sable fimbriated Argent. It was designed by Carlisle Chang.

=== Colours ===
Scheme	Red	White	Black
HEX	#DA1A35	#FFFFFF	#000000
HSV	352–88–85	0–0–100	0–0–0
RGB	218-26-53	255, 255, 255	0-0-0

=== Construction ===
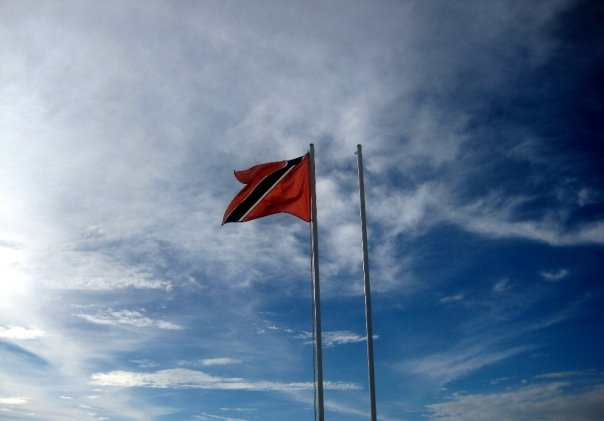
The flag of Trinidad and Tobago flying at the San Fernando Hill, San Fernando in July 2009.

The width of the white stripes is 1/30 of the flag length and the width of the black stripe is 2/15. The total width of the three stripes together is, therefore, 1/5 of the length.

Flag construction sheet

== Other flags ==
The civil ensign is the national flag in a 1:2 ratio. The naval ensign (used by Coast Guard vessels) is a British white ensign with the national flag in the canton.

Presidential Standard

Prime Ministerial Standard

Queen Elizabeth II's personal flag for Trinidad and Tobago (1966–1976)

=== British colonial flag ===
Prior to independence from the United Kingdom in August 1962, Trinidad and Tobago used a British blue ensign defaced with a badge depicting a ship arriving in front of a mountain.

Colonial flag of Trinidad and Tobago (1889–1958)

Red ensign of Trinidad and Tobago (1889–1958)

Colonial flag of Trinidad and Tobago (1958–1962)

Red ensign of Trinidad and Tobago (1958–1962)

== See also ==
- Flag of the West Indies Federation (January 1958 – May 1962)
- Coat of arms of Trinidad and Tobago
