= Patricia Bishop =

Trinidadian educator, music director and artist (1940–2011)

Pat Bishop TC
- Born: Patricia Alison Bishop; 6 May 1940; Port of Spain, Trinidad
- Died: 20 August 2011 (aged 71); Port of Spain, Trinidad
- Education: Bishop Anstey High School; King's College, Durham University; University of the West Indies
- Occupations: Educator, musician, artist
- Years active: 1961–2011
- Known for: Coaching and directing the Desperadoes Steel Orchestra and The Lydians

Patricia Alison "Pat" Bishop TC (6 May 1940 – 20 August 2011) was a Trinidadian educator, music director, artist and cultural icon. She was one of the first women to arrange for steelbands and was the recipient of the Trinity Cross, the highest of the National Awards of Trinidad and Tobago.

== Early life ==
Patricia Alison "Pat" Bishop was born on 7 May 1941 in Port of Spain, Trinidad, to Ena and Sonny Bishop. Her father was a musician and her mother was a dressmaker and fashion designer. Bishop had one younger sibling, a sister, Gillian, who would become a jewelry designer. She attended Tranquility Girls' School and then studied at Bishop Anstey High School. In 1958, she won the Trinidad & Tobago National Government Scholarship and left for England to pursue a bachelor's degree in fine arts from King's College, Durham University. Upon completion of her degree, in which she studied both painting and music, Bishop returned to Trinidad.

== Career ==
Bishop began teaching at her former school Bishop Anstey, remaining there for several years. She exhibited her first collection of artwork in 1961 in a group show with Jackie Hinkson and Peter Minshall. Bishop's early works were primarily realistic depictions of faces and scenery, but in her university studies with her tutor, Richard Hamilton, she was introduced to pop art. Carlisle Chang, who designed the Flag of Trinidad and Tobago and promoted indigenous art as an aesthetic, became her mentor when she returned to Trinidad. Among her works was the popular character "Charlie", created for the anti-littering campaign of the Solid Waste Management Company. Later in her career, Bishop did a series of miniatures, called "All the way to Caliban's Island", which featured artworks drawn from lines of William Shakespeare's play The Tempest.

In the late 1960s, Bishop returned to her education, pursuing a master's degree at the University of the West Indies (UWI) from 1968. She completed her thesis, Runaway Slaves in Jamaica 1740–1807 in 1970, graduating with a master's degree in art history. Between 1970 and 1972, she taught art history and design as a lecturer at the Jamaica School of Art and Crafts. Bishop then became a lecturer at both the Mona and St. Augustine campuses of UWI for eight years, teaching both art and the history of the West Indies.

While performing as a singer with the Tripoli Steel Orchestra, Bishop decided to arrange music. Beginning with hymns and classical works, she soon turned toward arranging music for steel orchestras. She was one of the first women to arrange music specifically for steelbands. Among those with whom she collaborated in music arrangement for pan drums were Ray Holman, Ken Philmore, Jit Samaroo, and Boogsie Sharpe, as well as for the bands Birdsong, Desperadoes Steel Orchestra, Pandemonium and Phase II. Bishop brought her classical music training into the arrangements she wrote, merging them with the Caribbean sounds of steel drums. One of her concerns was that the mastery of noted panmen would be lost, because as untrained musicians they lacked the literacy to score their works. She advocated for panning to be taught in schools, so that students could carry on the tradition by learning its history, techniques and the theory behind performance.

In addition to arranging music, Bishop composed two full-length folk operas and several choral pieces based on Trinidadian folk traditions. The operas Dalinda and the Swamp and Voice and Steel combined drums and oboe as the foundation for the vocal productions. In 1981, Bishop was one of the founders of the Schools Steelband Music Festival and served as both a resource and judge for the festival for many years. She had a long history of consultancy with art and cultural groups, and became known as "The First Lady of Pan" for her depth of knowledge and skill in bringing steelbands to prominence.

During the 1980s, Bishop became the director of the Desperadoes Steel Orchestra. Arranging music for the Desperadoes, she also contracted with major venues gaining a respected reputation in the steelband world, eventually taking them on eight major tours in the United States. In 1987, the group played at Carnegie Hall with Liza Minnelli and The New York Pops Orchestra, at Harlem′s Apollo Theater, at Rockefeller Center and at the Brooklyn Academy of Music. The Rockefeller Center performance was taped and aired on Channel 4, the NBC affiliate in New York City. Bishop directed and prepared some of Trinidad's most noted steelbands in festival competitions and critically reviewed pan music for Radio Trinidad. In 1986, she was awarded the Hummingbird Gold Medal by the government of Trinidad and Tobago.

Bishop took over direction of the choir, The Lydians in 1987, when its director Joyce Spence became ill. Under her leadership, the singers developed a diverse repertoire of challenging music including Caribbean, Latin American and European Classical music songs. She developed a steelpan orchestra, known as the Lydian Steel, to accompany performances of The Lydians, which included both traditional instruments, 20 steel drums, Tassa drums and African drums. Combining the performances with folk and ballet dancers The Lydians' shows represented the cultural mix of indigenous and European culture that is uniquely Caribbean.

In 1995, Bishop was awarded an honorary doctorate from UWI and the following year, received the highest national honor, when she was awarded the Trinity Cross. Also in 1996, Bishop directed The Lydians in its first opera Koanga by Frederick Delius. They performed the production at the Trinidad & Tobago Music Festival to critical acclaim. The review by Olive Lewill for the Jamaica Gleaner called the production a triumph, and said that Bishop had extracted from the musicians, who were both "engrossing and engrossed", a full understanding of the music. In 1997, Bishop was appointed by the Secretary General of CARICOM to serve on the inaugural board of directors for the CARICOM Foundation for Art and Culture.

In 2004, Bishop became one of the founders of the Music Literacy Trust, an organization aimed at the conservation of tradition and development of new talent, musical skill and teaching music. To preserve the traditions of Trinidad and Tobago, digital and printed format arrangements of music collections were gathered and donated to tertiary institutions for conservation. Bishop taught at UWI until her death. Her last class, in 2011, exhibited their historical research projects at the Museum of the City of Port of Spain and the Tobago Historical Museum.

== Death and legacy ==
Bishop died on 20 August 2011, aged 71, after suffering a stroke during a meeting with officials to discuss national cultural presentations. Posthumously, the Music Literacy Trust developed the Pat Bishop Scholarship Programme to assist music students and arrangers in furthering their education.

In January 2012, the Panorama Competition featured a presentation by the band Phase II Pan Groove, led by Boogsie Sharpe, featuring lyrics written by Gregory "GB" Ballantyne dedicated to Bishop. Initially, the song was titled "The Bishop of Pan", but the name changed upon the recommendation of other musicians to "The Archbishop of Pan".

In 2013, Bishop was posthumously designated a National Icon of Trinidad and Tobago at an award ceremony held to commemorate the 50th anniversary of the country's independence. Four years after her death, her final art exhibition was hosted by her sister, Gillian Bishop. It was a private show called She Sells Sea Shells by the Sea Shore and featured 20 artworks centred on the imagery of the sea. Utilizing blues, whites and golds, the pieces focused on the ocean, sun, sand and things that one might find on the beach.

Artistic works by Bishop are part of the permanent collection of the Central Bank of Trinidad and Tobago, one of the largest private art collections in Trinidad.
