= Denyse Plummer =

Trinidadian singer (1953–2023)

Denyse Plummer HBM

Background information
- Born: 8 November 1953; Saint James, Trinidad and Tobago
- Died: 27 August 2023 (aged 69)
- Genres: Calypso; gospel
- Occupation: Singer
- Years active: 1977–2023
- Spouse: Patrick Boocock (m. 1971)

Denyse Burnadette Kirline Plummer HBM (8 November 1953 – 27 August 2023) was a Trinidadian calypsonian and gospel singer. The child of a white father and a black mother, she initially faced significant prejudice in a genre traditionally seen as Afro-Caribbean, but was eventually recognised as a leading calypso performer. In 2001, she won the Calypso Monarch title with her songs "Heroes" and "Nah Leaving".

== Early life ==
Denyse Plummer was born in 1953 to a middle-class family in Saint James. Her father was Dudley "Buntin" Plummer, a white Trinidadian, and her mother was Joan Plummer, a light-skinned Afro-Trinidadian. Her father played guitar in a folk band called Le Petite Musicale. She attended Holy Name Preparatory and Holy Name Convent in Port of Spain. While attending Holy Name Convent, she sang in the folk choir, and won several youth music competitions. She also participated in several television talent competitions as a child and teenager.

== Career ==
=== Early career and calypso debut (1977–1985) ===
Plummer held several white-collar jobs until her mid-thirties, including working as a computer operator at Colonial Life & Accident Insurance Company. She then started performing pop music at nights at small bars and hotels throughout Trinidad and Tobago. She initially stayed away from calypso due to the stigma around white, middle- or upper-class people performing it, and due to the "smutty" perception of women who performed the genre. She later decided to leave her day job to pursue music full time, and between 1977 and 1983 she recorded some of the pop songs she typically performed.

In 1985, Phase II Pan Groove steelband arranger Len "Boogsie" Sharpe invited her to sing two calypso songs. According to Plummer, "everyone thought it was a joke including me. I had never sung calypso before and it took a lot of discussing over with family and friends. So we talked it over and they said go for it. If the hundred members of Phase II and Boogsie are behind you, you go ahead and do it." After Superblue heard the recording, he asked her to perform in his calypso tent, which then qualified Plummer to enter the Calypso Monarch competition.

=== Calypso career (1986–2015) ===
In 1986, Plummer made her debut at Calypso Fiesta, the National Calypso Monarch semi-finals at Skinner Park, San Fernando. The competition is known for a portion of its audience that relishes humiliating newcomers or performers who they dislike. Disapproving attendees who objected to a multiracial singer performing calypso held signs saying "Denyse Plummer go back to South Africa" and "white people don't sing calypso". They threw oranges and rolls of toilet paper at her; she picked up the toilet paper and waved it at the audience, incorporating it into her performance and winning over some of the spectators.

Plummer was enlisted by Phase II Pan Groove steelband arranger Len "Boogsie" Sharpe in 1986 to sing his band's Panorama entry. Plummer performed the vocals on Phase II's Panorama winners "This Feeling Nice" in 1987 and "Woman Is Boss" in 1988. Also in 1987, she earned third place in the National Calypso Monarch competition. In 1988, she made it to the National Calypso Monarch finals and also won the National Women's Action Committee (NWAC) Calypso Queen crown with "Woman Is Boss", a song she co-wrote with Sharpe and Reynold Howard. Plummer won the Calypso Queen title eight times over the years before retiring from that event. In 1989, Plummer won Amateur Night at Apollo Theater in Harlem, New York, when she performed Whitney Houston's "Didn't We Almost Have It All". In 1990, Plummer was the first woman to win the Young Kings Calypso Competition.

In 1998, Plummer debuted at the Chutney Soca Monarch competition with "Carnival Queen", which she co-wrote with Calypso Rose.

Plummer won Calypso Monarch in 2001 with "Nah Leaving", a song composed/authored by Christophe Grant, and "Heroes". She was the third woman to win the title. "Nah Leaving" has been described by calypso scholar Hope Munro as a "nation-building calypso", and it tackles societal concerns including racism and violence.

As her career progressed, Plummer became known for her ornate costumes, created by mas designers like Peter Minshall. She often wore elaborate hair extensions, wigs, and headpieces. She later explained that she felt the costuming was important to her performance because "when you visit [Trinidad and Tobago], come to see calypso, it is related to Carnival, which is color, which is costume, which is flamboyant, excitement." Calypso scholar Rudolph Ottley wrote of her outfits: "Her presentation truly enhances her calypsos rather than distracts from them."

Plummer's music often expresses patriotism to Trinidad and Tobago, describing its beauty and its people, though she does sometimes address problems in the country. Some of her songs also address children and children's education, and her 1989 song "Woman Is Boss" addresses gender inequality. Plummer believed that her role as a calypsonian was to promote and celebrate Trinidadian culture, as well as to invite tourism. She said, "The job of every calypsonian is to go out there and do something for the [Trinidadian] economy by bringing foreigners into here, spreading the news of our culture, of our Carnival, when it happens, and bring them by the thousands in February."

In 2011, she was honoured with the gold Hummingbird Medal. In 2015, she was recognised with a special award from the NWAC at the Calypso Queen event. Also in 2015, Plummer published an autobiography titled The Crossover.

=== Gospel career (2015 on) ===
In 2015, prior to Carnival, Plummer announced that she had become a born-again Christian, and would from then on be performing "gospelypso and groovy soca about God and His Kingdom." Despite her conversion, she did not adopt the view held by many born-again Christians that calypso is "devil music", and explained in an interview that "Calypso and soca are still the rhythms that I use. It is only the message that is different. It's what you sing about and how you behave when you are performing that determines if it is acceptable to God." She performed at churches in Trinidad and Tobago, and also performed at gospel concerts and abroad. She released songs including "Highest Praise", "Safe on the Inside" (with Michelle Sylvester), and "Cyah Leave Him", a worship rendition of her 2001 hit "Nah Leaving".

== Influences ==
Len "Boogsie" Sharpe, Austin "Blue Boy" Lyons (later known as Superblue), Lord Kitchener, and Black Stalin were influential to Plummer. Throughout her career, Plummer has sung several tribute songs to Lord Kitchener, who invited her to perform in his Calypso Revue tent for years and served as her mentor. Black Stalin taught Plummer how to perform calypso, including how to word her lyrics and where to take breaths for the most impactful delivery.

== Personal life ==
Plummer married Patrick Boocock, and became pregnant with their first child in 1985. They ultimately had two sons. Plummer's family was instrumental to her career, with her mother living with her and helping to maintain the household, and her sister coordinating her schedule, contracts, and other aspects of her career. In 2015, Plummer announced she had been born again, and was baptised at World Outreach Church Ministries.

Plummer died on 27 August 2023, at age 69, after being diagnosed with stage four breast cancer.

== Discography ==
- Natural (1978)
- The Boss (1988)
- Still the Boss (1989)
- Victory (1990)
- Carnival Killer (1991)
- Dynamic (1992)

== See also ==
- Drupatee Ramgoonai
