= Michelle Digman =

American chemist and academic

- Education: University of Illinois Urbana-Champaign
- Scientific career
- Workplaces: University of California, Irvine
- Thesis: Structure function analysis of protein kinase C and the mechanistic study of annexin (2003)

Michelle Digman is an American chemist who is an associate professor at the University of California, Irvine. She is Director of W.M. Keck Nanoimaging Lab and co-leads the Laboratory for Fluorescence Dynamics. Her research develops imaging technologies to better understand biological problems.

== Early life and education ==
Digman studied chemistry at the University of Illinois Urbana-Champaign. Her doctorate involved structure-function investigations of Protein kinase C. She remained there for postdoctoral research, moving from the department of chemistry and physics. She became director of the Optical Biology Core Facility.

== Research and career ==
In 2013, Digman joined the faculty at the University of California, Irvine. She develops and uses new biophysical, bioengineering and optical tools to better understand biological processes and improve healthcare. In particular, Digman has focused on the development of non-invasive imaging techniques to study changes of fluorescent biomarkers that provide information on cellular health. She led a team that developed open software to better segment and track mitochondria in cellular imaging.

Digman studies the spatial and temporal activation of Rho proteins during cell migration, a critical stage of embryonic development. This involves the use of raster image correlation spectroscopy and Number and Molecular Brightness (N&B) analysis using a laser scanning microscope.

== Awards and honors ==
- 2017 Hellman Fellows Award
- 2017 Scialog Fellow
- 2019 National Science Foundation CAREER Award
- 2021 Allen Distinguished Investigator Award

== Selected publications ==
- Michelle A Digman; Valeria R Caiolfa; Moreno Zamai; Gratton, Enrico (2007). "The phasor approach to fluorescence lifetime imaging analysis". Biophysical Journal. 94 (2): L14-6. doi:10.1529/biophysj.107.120154. PMC 2157251. PMID 17981902. Wikidata Q36303232.
- Michelle A Digman; Claire M Brown; Parijat Sengupta; Wiseman, Paul; Alan R Horwitz; Gratton, Enrico (2005). "Measuring fast dynamics in solutions and cells with a laser scanning microscope". Biophysical Journal. 89 (2): 1317–1327. doi:10.1529/biophysj.105.062836. PMC 1366616. PMID 15908582. Wikidata Q30446325.
- Michelle A Digman; Rooshin Dalal; Alan F Horwitz; Gratton, Enrico (2007). "Mapping the number of molecules and brightness in the laser scanning microscope". Biophysical Journal. 94 (6): 2320–2332. doi:10.1529/biophysj.107.114645. PMC 2257897. PMID 18096627. Wikidata Q30441376.
