= Ray Holman =

Raymond Anthony Holman (born 1944) is a musician, composer, pannist and performer from Trinidad and Tobago.

== Biography ==
In 1957, Ray Holman began playing steelpan at the age of 13 with the Invaders Steel Orchestra, led by Ellie Mannette, for whom he composed his first pan piece, "Ray's Saga", recorded by the Invaders in 1961. At 20, he became the youngest player to win the solo Ping Pong (an early version of the tenor pan) competition in the 1964 Trinidad and Tobago Music Festival. Later, he became arranger for Invaders Steelband, doing classical pieces such as "Dream of Olwen" and "Etude in Ab."

In 1963, he moved to work with the steel band Starlift, whom he achieved consistent success with in both the Panorama competition and the informal "Bomb" played on the road at Carnival. Two of his most renowned arrangements were "I Feel Pretty" and "Penny Lane". During the 1960s his arrangements placed Starlift in the top 3 twice (1964: "Mas in South" – Kitchener, 3rd place; 1968: "Jane" – Sparrow, 2nd place) before finally winning the coveted first prize in 1969 with his arrangement of Kitchener's "The Bull". After placing second in 1970 with Sparrow's "Pan Man," Starlift was joint winner of the 1971 Panorama, tying for first place with Harmonites ("Play Mas'" – Kitchener) with Holman's stunning arrangement of "Queen Of The Bands." He has arranged Panorama tunes for a number of top steel bands, including Phase II Pan Groove, Exodus, Carib Tokyo, Hummingbirds Pan Groove, Invaders, and Pandemonium and since 2001 he has returned to the local band with which he achieved his early success – Starlift.

As an international artist he has also arranged and recorded with steel bands and artists in the US, Canada, Latin America, Japan and Europe, including televised performances with the WDR Big Band (conducted by Vince Mendoza), which showcased his compositions. He composed the highly acclaimed score for Black Orpheus, staged by Crossroads Theatre Company in New Jersey in 1991, and has been a featured performer in film, television and at venues such as Madison Square Garden, the Super Bowl and the St. Lucia Jazz Festival.

== "Own Tunes" ==
1972 would prove to be a historical turning point for the Panorama competition, as for the first time Holman took Starlift to Panorama with a composition of his own - "Pan On the Move". Previously, only vocal compositions by a popular local calypsonian had been arranged for performance in Panorama, and members of other bands even threatened violence if Holman's so-called "Own Tune" won the competition, as they did not consider it to be a "proper" calypso. Since the popularity of a particular piece enhances its chances in Panorama, Holman's decision was particularly bold, as the audience was unfamiliar with the song, so the resulting award of third place is even more surprising, and further proof of his outstanding skills than it may at first seem. Since the 1980s, many other composers have followed Holman's lead in writing so-called "Own Tunes" (i.e. a piece composed especially for pan, rather than an arrangement of a vocal calypso) for Panorama. Most notably, former Starlift player Lennox Sharpe also known as "Boogsie" (leader and composer for Phase II Pan Groove), who has achieved cult status for his phenomenal arranging and soloing skills, was the first person to win Panorama with an own tune, which he has now done on five occasions. To date, the only other composer to win with an own tune was Pelham Goddard, whose composition "A Happy Song" performed by Exodus, won in 2001. Other composers such as Godwin Bowen, Kenrick Philmore, Robert Greenidge and American pannist Andy Narell and others followed him and today, the Panorama "Own Tune" is becoming more commonplace.

== Compositional style ==
Since 1971 Holman has produced a string of beautiful calypsos, which are characterized use of five against four hemiola, and by long flowing melodic arcs, supported by complex harmonic progressions, suspended harmonies and extended chords, in contrast to the more standard 16-bar frameworks and simple chord schemes used by other composers. "Panyard Vibrations" (1977), for example, has three major sections (as opposed to the verse/chorus form often found in calypso), and his 2007 piece "We Just Can't Go On Like This" has a similar tripartite form, with a 32-bar verse, 59-bar chorus and 32-bar "tag". "Heroes Of The Nation" (2001) starts with the highly complex chord progression G#min7 flat5/C#7aug5/C#7/Dmaj7/E7sus4, a level of harmonic sophistication few other calypso composers have reached.

== Pedagogy and awards ==
A University of the West Indies graduate, and alumnus of Queen's Royal College, Ray Holman was a teacher of Spanish and History at Fatima College, and has taught pan in many higher education institutions in the United States of America. He has conducted workshops at West Virginia University and was a Commissioned Composer in the California State University Summer Arts Program. He regularly attends the bi-annual steelband tuning and arranging workshop at Humboldt State University in Arcata, California, and has done presentations at meetings of the Percussive Arts Society. During 1998-2000 he was a distinguished Visiting Artist in the Ethnomusicology Program at the University of Washington, Seattle.

Holman has won many prestigious musical awards, including the Hummingbird Medal of Merit (Silver) from the Government of Trinidad and Tobago and a Pan Legend Award from the New York Folk Arts Institute and the U.S. Congress. He was recognized for his musical contribution by the Republic Pan Fiesta 2003, A Tribute to Ray Holman.

== Discography ==
- Steelband Paradise — A Tribute To Ray Holman, Delos DE 4025, 1994
- In Touch, Ramajay Records, RR70009-2, 2003
- Steelband Paradise — A Tribute To Ray Holman - SPECIAL EDITION, double CD, Sanch DE 0402-2, 2003
- Changing Time — original compositions (includes printable sheet music files), double CD, Woodbrook Music Inc/UWI, 2006
- First Love, Ramajay Records, RR70021, 2019
- Holman's compositions can also be found on Sanch compilation albums of the yearly Panorama competition. Several deleted albums recorded by Starlift in the early 1970s also feature his work.
