= Olive Walke =

Trinidadian musician and ethnomusicologist (1911–1969)

- Born: Beatrice Olive Walke; 21 December 1911; Belmont, Port of Spain, Trinidad
- Died: 10 September 1969 (aged 57); St. James, Port of Spain, Trinidad
- Occupations: Musician, music instructor, politician
- Years active: 1940–66
- Known for: Founding La Petite Musicale
- Notable work: "Every Time Ah Pass" and "Mangos"

Olive Walke, MBE (21 December 1911 – 10 September 1969) was a Trinidadian musician and ethnomusicologist who was one of the first to make records of regional Caribbean folk songs. She founded the well-known choir, La Petite Musicale and directed it for many years. Between 1961 and 1966, she served as a Senator in the first Parliament of Trinidad and Tobago established after its independence.

== Early life ==
Beatrice Olive Walke was born on 21 December 1911 in the Belmont neighborhood of Port of Spain, Trinidad, to Anella and Samuel Arthur Walke. Walke was raised by her aunt and uncle, Edith and Simeon Hayes, from the age of 10. She attended Tranquillity Girls School and the Intermediate Government School, before graduating from Bishop Anstey High School.

Walke moved to London to continue her education, studying music at the Trinity College of Music. She met and married Frank Hercules, a Trinidadian student of law, who would become a noted writer, in 1936 in Hampstead, London, England. Graduating with her ATCL degree, Walke continued her studies at the Royal Academy of Music where she had a son named John. She graduated with her licentiate and returned to Trinidad. Hercules left London and immigrated to New York and there the couple had a divorce. Their son was adopted by Walke's aunt and uncle, Edith and Simeon Hayes, and in later life, John Simon Anthony Hayes would become the first nephrologist in Trinidad and Tobago and the founder of the Trinidad and Tobago Kidney Foundation.

== Career ==
Walke began giving music lessons and hosting a weekly radio show, Musicians in the Making, which featured young musicians where they were give a platform to gain exposure. In December 1939, she founded a choral group called "La Petite Musicale", originally as a seasonal choir which performed traditional Christmas carols. The group met in Walke's home, where they would rehearse and then, renting a bus, the choir sang carols at various homes in the community. Soon after the new year, the group began to focus on the traditional folk music of Trinidad and Tobago, when Walke took members of the group to the rural areas of Trinidad and Tobago. They travelled to Blanchisseuse, Guaico Tamana, Sangre Grande and Scarborough on Tobago to learn local folk songs in rural parts of the island. Village people would teach the choir members the songs, tell them of the background of the songs and Walke would take notes. She then transcribed and arranged the songs as performance pieces. She was one of the first to research and formally perform folk music in the Caribbean, bringing focus to the importance of the genre, with its traditional Creole languages and instruments.

Through La Petite Musicale, Walke brought rural Trinidadian music to the concert stage and earned national and international acclaim. The group were the first to treat folk music as worthy of performance by a formal music ensemble and they traveled widely. In 1958, they participated in a Caribbean-wide arts festival. The following year, Walke was presented to Princess Margaret in recognition of her contributions in collecting the early history of folk music in the Caribbean and was awarded the Member of the Order of the British Empire. In 1964, Walke took them to the World Folk Festival in Covington, Kentucky, and the CARIFTA Expo '69 in Grenada, as well as giving performances in Martinique and Saint Lucia. Walke's work inspired others to form chapters of La Petite Musicale, like the one that formed in Toronto in 1969.

In 1962, the year that Trinidad and Tobago gained independence from Britain, Walke was appointed as senator in the first Parliament of the new nation. She focused most of her attention in that body to improving education and advancing cultural development in the country. In 1969, the inaugural year of the Hummingbird Medal, Walke received the Gold Medal for her contributions of devoted service to the country.

== Death and legacy ==
Walke died on 10 September 1969 in St. James, Port of Spain, Trinidad, after a lengthy illness. Posthumously in 1970, her collection of traditional music, Folk Songs of Trinidad and Tobago, was published. Her music is still performed in Trinidad. In 2003, Orville Wright paid homage to her as his mentor in a concert "Reid, Wright and be Happy", which also featured Ron Reid and David "Happy" Williams. In 2007, Amadi Productions presented a concert, "Ambataila Women", which featured some of Walke's works, including her most popular songs, "Every Time Ah Pass" and "Mangos". In celebration of the nation's 50th Independence Anniversary, Walke was one of the influential citizens selected by the Ministry of Education and author, Nassar Khan, to be included in the publication, Profiles of the Heroes, Pioneers and Role Models of Trinidad and Tobago. The Toronto chapter of La Petite Musicale celebrated its 45th anniversary in 2014 with a concert performing pieces by Walke. A trophy that bears her name is presented at the Trinidad and Tobago Music Festival annually.
