= Clive Bradley =

Clive Bradley may refer to:

- Clive Bradley (musician) (1936–2005), Trinidadian arranger of steelpan music
- Clive Bradley (screenwriter) (born 1959), British screenwriter
