= Akil Borneo =

Trinidad and Tobago DJ

Akil Anthony Borneo (born 18 April 1979), better known by his stage name 5Star Akil, is a Trinidadian singer, songwriter, DJ and entrepreneur.

== Biography ==
Borneo was born and raised in St James, Trinidad and Tobago. He went on to attend Mucurapo Boys' RC School, Mucurapo Senior Comprehensive and Diego Martin Secondary School. Borneo was later hired, as a DJ at 96.1 WE FM, an urban radio station. While there, alongside a few friends, he formed a DJ crew called Associate Degree Sound System. After nine years at 96.1, Borneo made a move to Slam 100.5 FM, another urban radio station.

In 2012, 5Star Akil released his first major Soca single Partier, which was followed by another hit release in 2014, To Meh Heart

In 2016 Desperadoes Steel Orchestra chose 5Star Akil's hit single, Different Me, to win their 11th National Panorama title With this title, Desperados ended a 16 year span, of not winning the competition.

In 2017 5Star Akil released his debut mix tape HERO.

== Personal life ==
In April 2010, Akil was shot five times. In 2022 Borneo got baptised at the St. James Pentecostal Church. In becoming a born again Christian, he made a exit from the Soca stage. Borneo is now a entrepreneur, being the owner of Island Treats, a local frozen treats company.
