= Bobby Mohammed =

Trinidad and Tobago musician and pannist (1942–2021)

Lennox Sylvanus "Bobby" Mohammed (2 June 1942 - 25 May 2021) was a musician and pannist from Trinidad and Tobago. He was the youngest arranger to win Panorama.

== Career ==
Lennox Mohammed was born on 2 June 1942 in Siparia; his family moved to Mon Repos in San Fernando when he was nine years old. He attended Presentation College, and was a founding member of the Gondoliers steelband. He left and founded the Cavaliers in 1961 with 18 pannists. Later that year, the Gondoliers and the Cavaliers faced each other in a competition to win sponsorship from Guinness Caribbean Ltd, with the Cavaliers winning. The Cavaliers went on to win the 1964 Southern Steelband Competition. In 1965, the Cavaliers took first place at the Panorama competition, making Mohammed the youngest arranger to win. After placing second in 1966, Mohammed and the Cavaliers finished first again in 1967.

Mohammed was awarded the Gold Hummingbird Medal in 1992. In 2019, the Harris Promenade East Street in San Fernando was renamed the Lennox "Bobby" Mohammed Street in his honour.

Mohammed died on 25 May 2021 at the San Fernando General Hospital after experiencing kidney failure. His funeral was held on 1 June.
