= Kandice Tanner =

Trinidad and Tobago biophysicist

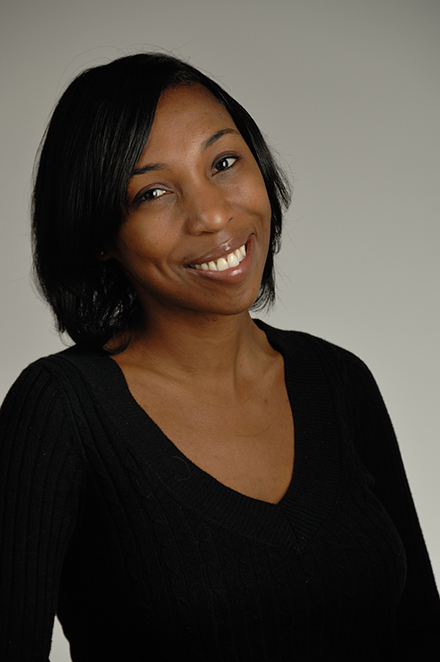
- Education: South Carolina State University; University of Illinois at Urbana–Champaign (PhD)
- Scientific career
- Fields: Biophysics
- Institutions: National Cancer Institute
- Thesis: "Cat"-ology: spectrally resolved neurophotonics in the mammalian brain and phantom studies (2006)
- Doctoral advisor: Enrico Gratton

Kandice Tanner is a Trinidad and Tobago biophysicist researching the metastatic traits that allow tumor cells to colonize secondary organs. She is a Senior Investigator (full tenure) at the National Cancer Institute, where she is head of the Tissue morphodynamics section.

== Early life and education ==
Kandice Tanner was born in Trinidad and Tobago. Her father was a manufacturing engineer and her mother stayed at home with Tanner and her siblings for 7 years before returning to the workplace. Tanner has said that her mother always knew she would become a physicist from her early affinity for math and science.

Kandice Tanner attended Bishop Anstey High School, an all girls school in Port of Spain, Trinidad and Tobago, before becoming one of the only 12 female students at an all-boys school of 1,200 students. She intended on attending the University of the West Indies where she had already been accepted before receiving a full scholarship at the South Carolina State University, a historically Black college in Orangeburg, South Carolina. In 2002, Tanner completed a dual bachelor's degree in electrical engineering and physics, summa cum laude.

In 2006, she completed a Ph.D. in physics at the University of Illinois at Urbana–Champaign under advisor Enrico Gratton. Her doctoral research entailed mapping functional specialization in mammalian brains. Tanner's dissertation was titled "Cat"-ology: spectrally resolved neurophotonics in the mammalian brain and phantom studies.

She conducted post-doctoral training at the University of California, Irvine specializing in dynamic imaging of thick tissues. She then became a Department of Defense Breast Cancer Post-doctoral fellow jointly at University of California, Berkeley and Lawrence Berkeley National Laboratory under Mina Bissell.

== Career ==
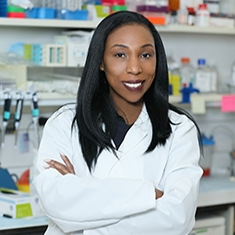
Tanner in her laboratory

Tanner joined the National Cancer Institute as a Stadtman Tenure-Track Investigator in July 2012, where she integrates concepts from molecular biophysics and cell biology to learn how cells and tissues sense and respond to their physical microenvironment, and to thereby design therapeutics and cellular biotechnology. She received full tenure in 2020. She is currently a senior principal investigator in the laboratory of cell biology serving as head of the tissue morphodynamics section.

=== Research ===
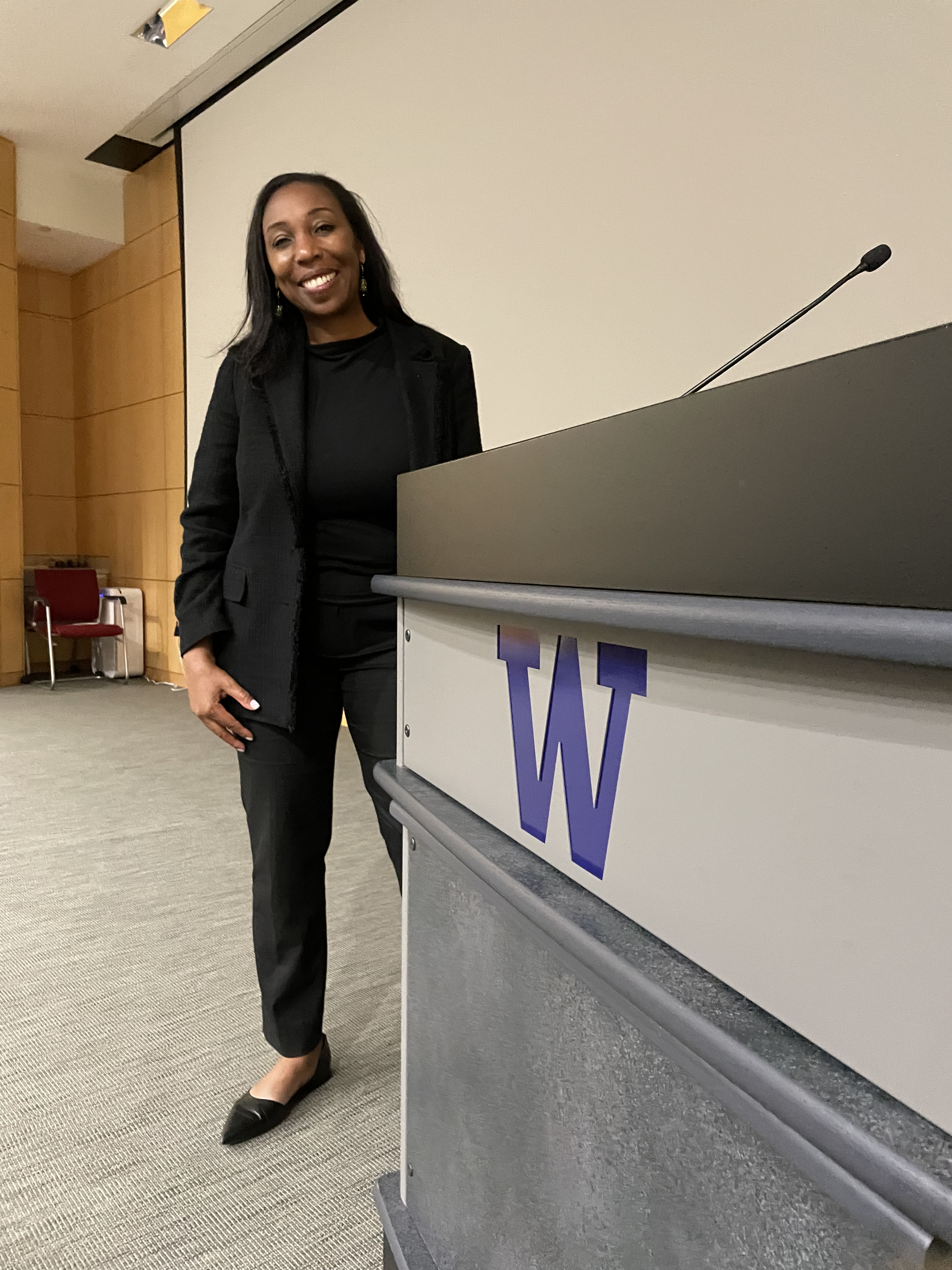
Kandice Tanner giving the Paul Bornstein Memorial Lecture on 16 May 2024 at the Department of Biochemistry at the University of Washington

Tanner's expertise includes multimodal imaging platforms, 3D cell culture, biophysics, mechanobiology, and breast cancer. Her laboratory focuses on understanding the metastatic traits that allow tumor cells to colonize secondary organs. Her team includes physicists, engineers, and cancer biologists. They have determined that cells can switch between different types of motility namely rotation, random and amoeboid when placed in 3D biomimetic platforms. Tanner's lab has linked the type of motility to the establishment of distinct multicellular architectures and tissue polarity. Additionally, they use optical microscopy to uncover in vivo mechanisms of metastasis using zebrafish as an animal model. The laboratory studies are focused on understanding how physical cues from the tissue microenvironment drive organ specific metastasis.

== Awards and honors ==
Tanner was awarded the 2013 National Cancer Institute Director's Intramural Innovation Award, the 2015 NCI Leading Diversity award, Federal Technology Transfer Award in 2016 and 2018, the 2016 Young Fluorescence Investigator award from the Biophysical Society, and named as a Young Innovator in Cellular and Molecular Bioengineering in 2016 by the Biomedical Engineering Society. In 2020, Tanner was elected Fellow of the American Physical Society.

== Selected works ==
- Ulrich, Theresa A.; Jain, Amit; Tanner, Kandice; MacKay, Joanna L.; Kumar, Sanjay (2010). "Probing cellular mechanobiology in three-dimensional culture with collagen–agarose matrices". Biomaterials. 31 (7): 1875–1884. doi:10.1016/j.biomaterials.2009.10.047. PMID 19926126.
- Tanner, K.; Mori, H.; Mroue, R.; Bruni-Cardoso, A.; Bissell, M. J. (2012). "Coherent angular motion in the establishment of multicellular architecture of glandular tissues". Proceedings of the National Academy of Sciences. 109 (6): 1973–1978. Bibcode:2012PNAS..109.1973T. doi:10.1073/pnas.1119578109. ISSN 0027-8424. PMC 3277511. PMID 22308439.
- Tanner, Kandice; Gottesman, Michael M. (2015). "Beyond 3D culture models of cancer". Science Translational Medicine. 7 (283): 283ps9. doi:10.1126/scitranslmed.3009367. ISSN 1946-6234. PMC 5063633. PMID 25877888.
