= Gérard Besson =

Trinidadian writer and publisher (1942–2023)

Gérard A. Besson HBM
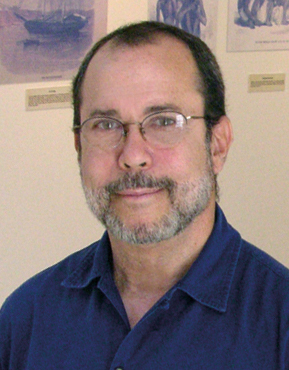
- Besson in 2007
- Born: Gérard Anthony Besson; 20 January 1942; Port of Spain, Trinidad and Tobago
- Died: 25 July 2023 (aged 81)
- Citizenship: Trinidad and Tobago
- Occupations: Writer, publisher
- Spouse: Alice Besson
- Writing career
- Language: English
- Genres: History, folklore, historical fiction, magical realism
- Notable works: The Book of Trinidad; The Cult of the Will; From the Gates of Aksum
- Notable awards: Hummingbird Medal Gold, Lifetime Achievement Award National Trust, Honorary Doctorate University of the West Indies

Gérard Anthony Besson HBM (20 January 1942 – 25 July 2023) was a Trinidad and Tobago writer and publisher.

== Life and career ==
Gérard was born on 20 January 1942 in Port of Spain as the only child of Joseph and Margaret Besson. His father was a white plantation overseer, his colored mother worked in the oil industry. After the early separation of his parents, he grew up in the Catholic, Patois-speaking household of his maternal grandmother. After elementary school, he attended St. Thomas High School in Belmont until the age of 15 when he started working in insurance and in manufacturing companies. After he received an inheritance on the death of his grandmother he traveled to Europe and Great Britain where he unavailingly tried to gain ground as a painter and writer. After his return to Trinidad, he worked as a copywriter for various advertising agencies. In the late 1960s, he attracted attention by using black models to advertise high-priced products, a novelty in Trinidad. In 1973, he founded his own advertising agency together with Clive Bradley. In the same year, he married Sheelagh Hezekiah with whom he has three sons. From 1979 until 1985, he served for seven years on the St. Augustine Campus Council of the University of the West Indies (UWI). At the beginning of the 1980s, Besson was a member of a circle of writers and historians around Olga Mavrogordato (née Boos), widow of Colonel Arthur Stephen Mavrogordato. This group, of which Anthony de Verteuil and Michael Anthony were also members, was dedicated to publishing works about the history and cultural traditions of Trinidad and Tobago. In 1981, Besson founded the publishing company Paria Publishing, initially focussed on republishing of out-of-print works on the history of Trinidad and Tobago. In the following 35 years, he produced and published more than 130 books, many of which non-fiction books by Trinidadian historians. From 1982 to 1985, Besson was a director of the National Museum and Art Gallery in Port of Spain. In 1995, Besson's advertising agency was acquired by Lonsdale Saatchi & Saatchi; Besson himself remained as creative director. In 1996, he got divorced from his first wife, and, in 1998, he married German-born Alice Schwarz.

Besson retired from Lonsdale Saatchi & Saatchi in 2002 but continued to contribute to the cultural life in Trinidad. In the 2000s, he curated exhibitions in several museums such as in the Museum at the House of Angostura (2001–03), in the Heritage Library (2004) and in the National Museum and Art Gallery (2007). In 2005, he was appointed to the board of the National Trust and served on the advisory council for the setting up of an Academy of Arts, Letters, Culture and Public Affairs of the University of Trinidad and Tobago. In 2011, he was appointed to serve on the Equal Opportunities Commission by Trinidadian president George Maxwell Richards and continued to work for the commission until 2014.

Besson was also a member of the Association of Caribbean Historians.

Gérard Besson died on 25 July 2023, at the age of 81.

== Works ==
Besson's work as a historian covers various aspects of Trinidadian and Tobagonian history and culture which can partly be traced back to research assignments from various companies and institutions. A core element of his fictional work is the history of the Afro-French-Creole presence in Trinidad and Tobago and the wider Caribbean, the ethnic group from which his family originates. This topic is being dealt with in his novels The Voice in the Govi and From the Gates of Aksum. The storylines of his novels are fictitious, but the backgrounds are historical, especially in Roume de St. Laurent … A Memoir. This novel depicts the life of Philippe Rose Roume de Saint-Laurent, a French adventurer who had a significant influence on the development of Spanish Trinidad in the late 18th century. Roume was instrumental in the promulgation of the Cedula of Population of 1783 in the Caribbean, an edict of Spanish minister José de Gálvez y Gallardo that allowed settlers into Trinidad, provided they followed the Catholic faith and swore fealty to the Spanish crown. This edict created a remarkable increase in the population of the island, mostly French-speaking colonists.

In 2000 and 2001, Besson wrote and produced The Land of Beginnings, a monthly supplement to the Trinidadian newspaper Newsday that dealt with historical topics and appeared for 24 months. Trinidadian TV channel TTT financed the production of The Land of Beginnings as a three-part documentary. His 2010 non-fiction book The Cult of Will was the subject of controversy, as it sought to deconstruct the narrative of former Trinidad and Tobago prime minister Eric Williams with regard to the emancipation of the slaves in the British Empire.

Besson maintained the Caribbean History Archives, a private weblog where he collected new findings on Trinidadian history.

== Bibliography ==
=== Fiction ===
- 1973: Tales of the Paria Main Road (Creative Advertising)
- 1988: A Diary of Dreams (Paria Publishing)
- 2011: The Voice in the Govi (Paria Publishing)
- 2013: From the Gates of Aksum (Paria Publishing)
- 2016: Roume de St. Laurent … A Memoir (Paria Publishing)
- 2024: Philippine - The Philip Family of Grenada, Petite Martinique, Carriacou and Trinidad & Tobago (Paria Publishing, posthumous)

=== Non-Fiction ===
- 1985: A Photograph Album of Trinidad at the Turn of the 19th Century (Paria Publishing)
- 1987: From Colonial to Republic (Republic Bank, with Selwyn Ryan)
- 1991: Folklore and Legends of Trinidad and Tobago (Paria Publishing)
- 1991: The Book of Trinidad (Paria Publishing, with Bridget Brereton)
- 2000: The Angostura Story (Paria Publishing)
- 2002: The Angostura Historical Digest (Paria Publishing)
- 2004: Scotiabank – The First 50 Years (Paria Publishing)
- 2006: The History of Ansa McAL in the Caribbean (Paria Publishing)
- 2010: The Cult of the Will (Paria Publishing)

== Awards ==
- 2007: Hummingbird Medal in gold
- 2007: Lifetime Achiever Heritage Preservation Award of the National Trust of Trinidad and Tobago
- 2015: Honorary doctorate of the University of the West Indies
