= Bishop Anstey High School =

Government School in Trinidad and Tobago

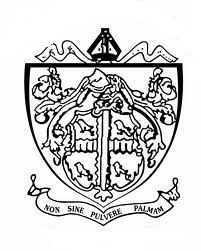
- Bishop Anstey High School Crest

Location
- 2-2A Chancery Lane; Port of Spain; Trinidad and Tobago; 10.66277°N 61.51204°W

Information
- Type: Anglican (Government-assisted) high school for girls
- Motto: Non sine pulvere palmam - No reward without effort
- Patron saint: St. Hilary
- Established: 1921
- Colors: Red, black, navy blue
- Website: bahs.edu.tt

Bishop Anstey High School (BAHS), also known as Bishop Anstey or St. Hilary's, is a government-assisted all-girls secondary school in Port of Spain, Trinidad and Tobago. It was founded by the Anglican Bishop Arthur Henry Anstey and opened on January 13, 1921. The school is governed by a Board of Management appointed and chaired by the Bishop of Trinidad and Tobago. Its assets are controlled and managed by The Bishop Anstey Association.

== Origins ==
The school's motto "Non sine pulvere palmam" is taken from the Epistles of Horace, the Roman lyric poet (65 BC–8 BC). The school's first principal was Miss Amelia Stephens. The School Song is "Non Nobis Domine" and the School Hymn is "Who would true valour see". The school was founded in 1921 by Bishop Arthur Henry Anstey. On January 13, 2021, the school celebrated its 100th anniversary.

== Admission and student tenure ==
Students enter Form I based on their grades from the Secondary Entrance Assessment (SEA) examination, which is organized and adjudicated by the Ministry of Education, Trinidad and Tobago. The latter examination is used to facilitate the placement of students in secondary schools throughout Trinidad and Tobago. The SEA comprises three papers on the subjects of Creative Writing, Mathematics, and Language Arts; it covers the national curriculum for Primary-level education with a focus on Standards 3–5.

Bishop Anstey follows the Secondary Education Modernization Programme (SEMP) Curriculum from Forms 1 to 3. During their fourth and fifth years, students follow the CSEC syllabus in preparation for the Caribbean Examinations Council (CXC) and University of Cambridge GCE Ordinary Level exams in various subjects, along with a compulsory core of English Language, English Literature and Mathematics. Sixth-form students prepare for, and sit, the Advanced Level CAPE and University of Cambridge GCE exams.

== House system ==
The current naming convention for the Houses at the school is based on the main mountains in Trinidad and Tobago. The Houses are named Trinity, Tamana, Cerro Del Aripo, Cumberland, Chancellor, and El Tucuche.

Each House is led by a captain and supported by Prefects, with guidance from a designated teacher. The school actively promotes student engagement in House activities, which encompass competitive sports, the Annual Bazaar, and Carnival activities.

Students are encouraged to actively participate in their respective Houses and proudly wear their House badges as a symbol of membership.

== Activities ==
Music: The Bishop Anstey High School Choir is composed of 60 BAHS students. In July 2005 and 2007, the Choir performed at the annual Llangollen International Musical Eisteddfod in Wales. On both occasions there was also a guest performance in London. In 2010, they performed at the Rhapsody's Children Music Festival in Vienna, Prague and Salzburg.

In July 2013, following a tour of South Africa, and with the assistance of the Trinidad and Tobago High Commission, the BAHS Choir performed in London.

Art: Bishop Anstey High School students won most of the prizes at the Eighth Biennial Art Competition held by Women in Art in collaboration with the National Museum and Art Gallery, under the aegis of the Ministry of Arts and Multiculturalism and the Ministry of Education.

Social engagement: Clubs include Animal Welfare, Asian Culture Club, Choir, Christian Fellowship Club, Film Club, Learn to Swim Classes and Spoken Word among many others.

Sports: Bishop Anstey High School Sports programs include cheerleading, competitive swimming, dragon boat racing, football, hockey, netball, rugby, taekwondo, track and field, volleyball and water polo.

== Some Bishop Anstey alumnae (Hilarian) ==
- Michelle Antoine - neuroscientist
- Sybil Atteck (1911−1975) - artist
- Pat Bishop (1940–2011) - artist, choreographer, ethno-musicologist.
- Janelle "Penny" Commissiong - Miss Universe 1977.
- Dana Seetahal SC (1955–2014) - attorney at law.
- Frances-Anne Solomon - filmmaker
- Marjorie Thorpe PhD. - chair, Public Service Commission, 2013–16.
- Olive Walke (1911–1969) - musician, ethno-musicologist.
- Paula-Mae Weekes - President, Republic of Trinidad and Tobago, 2018–2023.
- Dr. Kandice Tanner - biophysicist and Senior Investigator at the National Cancer Institute
- Allyson Williams (midwife)
