= Allyson Williams =

Carnival band administrator and former midwife (born 1947)

Allyson Williams MBE
- Born: Allyson Ingrid Layne; 1947 (age 78–79); Port of Spain, Trinidad and Tobago
- Education: Bishop Anstey High School
- Alma mater: University of Westminster; Birkbeck, University of London
- Occupations: Midwife, lecturer, carnival band administrator
- Known for: Chair of the board of the Notting Hill Carnival
- Spouse: Vernon Williams (m. 1976–2002, his death)
- Children: 2

Allyson Ingrid Williams née Layne MBE (born 1947) is a retired midwife, lecturer, carnival masquerade band administrator and chair of the board of the Notting Hill Carnival. She is noted for standing up to racism in her professional life, and is notable for advocating for women in childbirth and for community midwifery as well as for her decades long support of West Indian culture in the UK, represented in particular by the Notting Hill Carnival.

== Life and career ==
Born Allyson Layne in Port of Spain, Trinidad and Tobago, in 1947, she was one of five children. Her mother, Eldica, was a nurse and her father, Conrad, a carpenter. She sometimes accompanied her mother on home visits and saw homebirths. After studying at Bishop Anstey High School, she worked as a clerical officer in the Ministry of Education. The Ministry of Health recruited women and men from the colonies to train in London to be nurses and Allyson travelled from Trinidad and Tobago to England in May 1969 to train as a nurse at the Whittington Hospital in North London. Most of her classmates there were from overseas. She started on a midwifery training programme in February 1973. She worked in the UK National Health System (NHS) as a community midwife and senior midwife manager until she retired in 2002. She lectured in and wrote articles about midwifery. Her final role was deputy head of midwifery.

She gained a Bachelor of Arts degree in Healthcare Management at the University of Westminster in 1996. She also completed a two-year Master's degree at Birkbeck College, London University, in "Gender, Society and Culture".

During her professional life, Williams experienced racism from her patients. "One day I stood up in the ward and said, 'I know I am black. I have been black for 21 years. So, tell me something I don't know.'" This last phrase became the title of her autobiography.

In 1974, Allyson Layne met her future husband, Vernon Williams. He was a founder member of the Notting Hill Carnival. They married in 1976. In 1980, they founded a mas (masquerade) costume band called Genesis. She was the administrator of the band, its seamstress, and became the mas arena's representative on the Board, and subsequently Interim Chair of the Board in 2008. Williams had two children, Symone and Kevin. When her husband died, shortly before her retirement, Williams' daughter Symone took over the band.

On retiring, Williams took on charity work being a trustee for the Mothers' Union London Diocese, a director of the Notting Hill Carnival, on the Church Council for All Saints, Notting Hill. Williams also lectures and gives interviews on her role as a Windrush veteran and a pioneer of the Notting Hill Carnival for the last 44 years. She has written an autobiography. By 2025, Williams had given 38 years of continued service and commitment to carnival arts and the Notting Hill Carnival.

== Awards and legacy ==
As Williams was, at the time, Trinidadian, and Trinidad and Tobago gained independence from Britain in 1962, in June 2003, the Foreign and Commonwealth Office informed her that the Queen had appointed her as an Honorary Member of the British Empire in recognition of her services to the development of midwifery services for women. In 2024, Williams gained a lifetime achievement award from the University of Westminster as well as one from the Multicultural Business and Community Champions charity (MBCC). Her autobiography is entitled Tell Me Something I Don't Know: A Life of Love, Passion, Purpose and Success.

== Selected publications ==
- Williams, Allyson Ingrid (2023). Tell Me Something I Don't Know: A Life of Love, Passion, Purpose and Success. London: Marcia M Publishing. ISBN 9781913905798.
