= Dana Seetahal =

Trinidad and Tobago lawyer (1955–2014)

Dana Seetahal SC
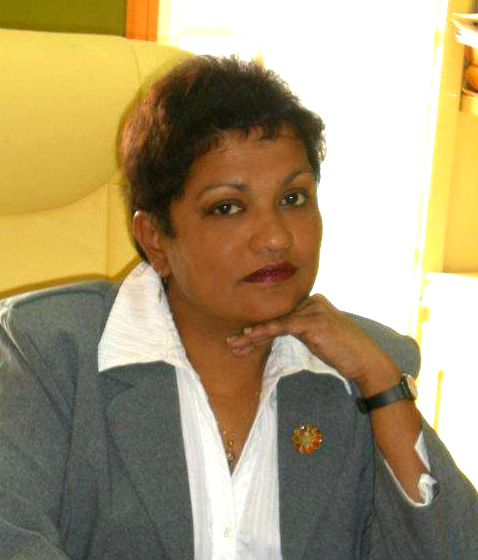
- Born: Dana Saroop Seetahal; 8 July 1955; Trinidad and Tobago
- Died: 4 May 2014 (aged 58); Woodbrook, Port of Spain, Trinidad and Tobago
- Cause of death: Assassination by gunshots
- Occupation: Lawyer

Dana Saroop Seetahal SC (8 July 1955 – 4 May 2014) was a Trinidad and Tobago lawyer and politician. She served as an Independent Senator in the Senate. She was an attorney at law in private practice and was formerly a lecturer at the Hugh Wooding Law School, Trinidad and Tobago, where she held the position of Course Director in Criminal Practice and Procedure. She was assassinated in Port of Spain on 4 May 2014.

== Life ==
Dana Saroop Seetahal was born on 8 July 1955, in Trinidad and Tobago. She was the eighth of eleven children born to Latchman and Sarjudeya Saroop Seetahal who were of Indian descent. She attended primary school in El Dorado Village, Tunapuna opposite Aramalaya Presbyterian Church. In 1965 she won a scholarship to attend Bishop Anstey High School in Port of Spain. In 1973 she went on to University and received a Bachelor of Laws from the University of the West Indies. In 1977 she attended Hugh Wooding Law School. She graduated and was called to the bar in 1979. After graduating she worked in the Solicitor General's Department, Magistrate, State Prosecutor, Private Practice in Justitia Omnibus. In 2002 she was appointed an Independent Senator in the Parliament of Trinidad and Tobago. She was awarded the status of 'Senior Counsel' in 2006.

== Education ==
Year	Description
1977	Hugh Wooding Law School, Trinidad & Tobago: Legal Education Certificate, Students’ Representative
1985	Florida State University, Tallahassee, School of Criminology: Master of Science, Criminology, (Awarded Florida Attorney General's Scholarship for outstanding performance), Thesis: "Plea Bargaining in the US"
1991	Institute of Human Rights, Strasbourg, France and Centre for Human Rights, Geneva: UN Fellowship, Certificate in Human Rights, 1991, Research Paper "The Functioning of the Human Rights Committee
1999	University of Minnesota, Leadership Fellow, Hubert Humphrey Institute of Public Affairs: Leadership for the Common Good Seminar 1999, January–May 1999
1999	University of Minnesota, USA: Fulbright Fellowship, Certificate of Completion in one year Fulbright program (Focussing on Criminal Justice), Hubert Humphrey Fulbright Fellowship Program, 1998–1999

== Career ==
After passing the bar Dana Seetahal worked as a State Prosecutor from 1980 to 1987. She prosecuted cases in the magistrates’ courts and later in the High Court. She performed as a Magistrate for one year from 1987 to 1988 but preferred prosecuting. As a magistrate she tried chiefly criminal cases at the summary level and presided at Juvenile Court. Acted as a coroner in inquests and conducted preliminary inquiries in indictable trials.

In 1988 she returned as a Senior State Prosecutor and from 1988 to 1991 she acted as assistant director of Public Prosecutions (DPP). She prosecuted indictable cases (felonies) at the High Court and appeared for the State in criminal matters at the Court of Appeal. Advised the Police and other government departments on criminal matters. Lectured to the police, state and non-governmental organizations, such as Rotary Clubs.

She became a Course Director and Senior Lecturer at Hugh Wooding Law School from 1995 to 2007. She taught and did research in the courses of Criminal Practice & Procedure, the Law of Evidence for ten Caribbean jurisdictions & Legal Drafting.

She was first appointed to Parliament in April 2002 as an Independent Senator in the 7th Republican Parliament. She was again appointed an Independent Senator in the 8th and 9th Parliaments (October 2002 to April 2010). She was not re-appointed to the 10th Parliament.

In January 2006 she was made a Senior Counsel ("took silk"). Her first contribution in the Senate was on The Appropriation Bill, 2003 on 28 October 2002. As a Senior Counsel in Private Practice she acted as Defence counsel appearing in criminal appellate and trial cases, Special Prosecutor for the State in a variety of matters, public law matters, consultancies in criminal matters, negotiation.

In 2008 she opened her own private chambers "El Dorado Chambers" located in Port of Spain, Trinidad, comprising 3 other lawyers and students.

She wrote a weekly column for the Saturday Express, having previously written for "The Guardian", both local newspaper in Trinidad and Tobago.

== Awards and honours ==
Title of Award or Fellow	Year	Description
Study Scholarship	1985	Full Pay Study Leave Award, January 1985 – December 1985 (Awarded a year's full pay leave, in effect a scholarship to pursue my master's degree in criminology at Florida State University's School Of Criminology)
St Augustine Jaycees Young Person of the Year	1987	Chosen as a role model for young persons in the town of St. Augustine
United Nations Fellow	1991	Attended the Centre for Human rights in Geneva, Switzerland and the Institute of Human Rights, Strasbourg to pursue a program in international law and international human rights
Commonwealth Foundation Fellow	1992	Visited the United Kingdom and Southern Africa: Botswana, Namibia and Zambia as part of a team of a Commonwealth professionals to meet with and share knowledge and experiences with a view to future cooperation between professional NGOs
Hubert H. Humphrey Fulbright Fellow	1998	A program of research and writing on the criminal justice system of the United States as well as making presentations on various academic for a and to NGOs
Award for National Service	1999	In recognition of contribution to the community and country by the Tunapuna/Piarco Regional Corporation at their second Civic Reception and Awards Ceremony on 28 October 1999.
T&T Representative to Commonwealth Workshop	2000	In Malta: Workshop on Democracy and Small States, organized by the Commonwealth Secretariat and the Commonwealth Parliamentary Association
US International Visitors Programme	2004	Selected by the US Department of Justice to participate in an individually designed programme with components across 5 US states in criminal justice: courts, police, prison, legal training
Senior Counsel	2006	Appointed Senior Counsel, President's House 31 January 2006
UWI Distinguished Alumni Award	2014	The awardees were selected from nominations received by a bi – partisan committee of Campus academic staff and the UWIAATT based on their outstanding contributions to their chosen fields, and to wider society. The 25 awardees are seen as an excellent example of the leading professionals and personalities that have studied at The UWI

== Works ==
Her first book the'Commonwealth Caribbean on Criminal Procedure' is the first of its kind to be published. Its credibility is supported not only by her theoretical knowledge, but also her practical knowledge earned over twenty years of experience in the field: as a prosecutor for over a dozen years, as a magistrate, as a criminologist, a criminal justice consultant and finally as a law school lecturer. "This book fills a lacuna in Commonwealth Caribbean jurisprudence in that there is currently no local or regional text on criminal practice and procedure. The content of the book includes both the statute law and common law on criminal practice and procedure in most of the relevant jurisdictions, which include Trinidad Tobago, Guyana, Barbados, Jamaica and Grenada among others."

"Revised throughout, this new edition addresses the recent changes in law in St Lucia and the Bahamas bringing this popular text right up-to-date. Although written for law students, as the only book which deals specifically with criminal practice and procedure in the Caribbean, it is also a useful reference tool for criminal justice professionals." The third edition of this book was released in July 2010, and contains a new chapter on extradition.

Regional Issues of Justice and Governance- Ambassador Colin Granderson and Miss Dana Seetahal.

=== Publications ===
- Report on Reform of the Criminal Law and Criminal Procedure: Saint Lucia: November 1999 – March 2000 (For the Government of Saint Lucia)
- The Lawyer (Journal of the Law Association of Trinidad & Tobago), March 2001: The Impact of Procedure on Advocacy. Recent Changes in the law in Trinidad and Tobago
- Caribbean Journal of Criminology and Social Psychology, January 2000: Pre-trial Publicity and a Fair Trial
- Can A Juror Change Her Mind? Bench and Bar of Minnesota, Official Publication of Minnesota State Bar Association, March 1999
- The Criminologist, Winter 1998: The effects of Urbanization and Industrialization on Crime: The Commonwealth Caribbean in the 1990s
- The Criminal Lawyer, (English Newsletter published by Butterworths) September 1998: Do you wish to retire?
- The Lawyer 2005: Child Murderers
- The Lawyer, April 1998: HIV/AIDS and Criminal Liability
- Caribbean Journal of Criminology and Social Psychology, January 1996:Plea Bargaining in the Caribbean
- The Education Act in Cultural Diversity, Politics, Education and Society, 1995, edited book, University of the West Indies
- The Lawyer, January 1994: The Jury, Tobago or Trinidad?
- The Lawyer, January 1993: Towards a better future in Corrections: Sentencing Alternatives
- The Lawyer, July 1992: Whiteman and the Admissibility of confessions

=== Consultancies and special projects ===
- Consultant, UNIFEM: "Review of Policing and Prosecution of Sexual Offences in St Lucia: May 2009
- Consultant and Trainer, National Insurance Board, NIPDEC House: 3-day Workshop: Training in Investigation for Compliance Officers: July 2009
- Consultant and Trainer, Police Service: Advanced Police Prosecutors Course (2): October–December 2007
- Contracted as Special Prosecutor, Office of the Director of Public Prosecutions, to represent the State in criminal appeals: March 2004 – present
- Consultant to the Government of Saint Lucia: Reform of the Criminal law and Procedure of Saint Lucia, August 1999 – Present. Report submitted November 1999; Laid in Cabinet, January 2000

== Assassination ==
On 4 May 2014, at 12:05 am, Seetahal was assassinated while driving her Volkswagen Touareg SUV in the vicinity of the Woodbrook Youth Club, Port of Spain, Trinidad. She was shot five times. On 24 July 2015, 11 men were arrested and charged with her murder.
