= Michelle Antoine =

Trinidadian neuroscientist

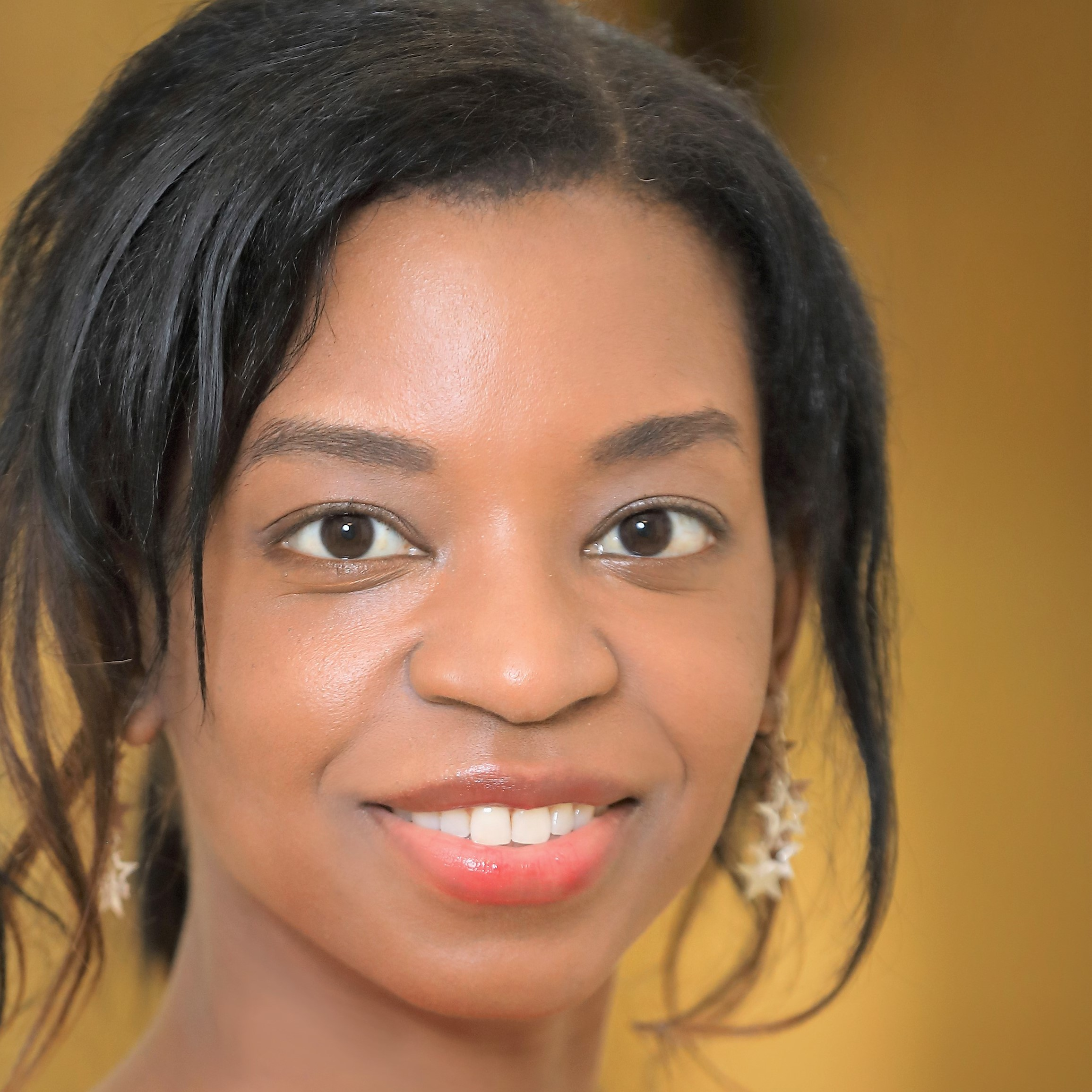
- Education: Albert Einstein College of Medicine; Spelman College
- Scientific career
- Workplaces: National Institute on Alcohol Abuse and Alcoholism

Michelle Antoine is a Trinidadian neuroscientist. She is acting chief of the section on neural circuits in the National Institute on Alcohol Abuse and Alcoholism (NIAAA). Her research has redefined the classical notion of excitatory-inhibitory balance and its role in autism. She continues to study the synaptic and circuit pathways that contribute to nervous system disorders, autism spectrum disorder in particular.

== Background and education ==
Michelle Antoine was born in Trinidad and Tobago, where she went to the all-female Bishop Anstey High School. After graduation from high school, she attended Spelman College where she received a Bachelor’s of Science in Biology and Mathematics. Following her graduation from Spelman College, Antoine went on to attend graduate school at Albert Einstein College of Medicine.

Antoine completed her postdoctoral training at the University of California, Berkeley, in Daniel Feldman’s laboratory, where she was a Miller Research Fellow and a UC President’s Postdoctoral Fellow.

== Career and research ==
Antoine wrote her dissertation about a causative link between inner ear defects and long-term striatal dysfunction. At Albert Einstein College of Medicine, Antoine noticed unusual hyper activity in mice. Antoine later found that inner ear dysfunction in mice has a direct causal relationship with neurological changes that increase hyperactivity. With these findings, Antoine provided two brain proteins as potential intervention targets for behavioral abnormalities. These proteins include pERK (phosphorylated extracellular signal-regulated kinase) and pCREB (phospho-cAMP response-element binding protein).

As a Miller Postdoctoral Fellow, Antoine worked with Daniel Feldman's team to analyze four mouse models in relation to the 'signaling imbalance theory', which is a well known hypothesis about the origin of autism in the brain. This theory states that the brains of autistic people have an excess of excitatory brain activity, but not enough inhibitory signals to counterbalance. As a result, the neurons in brains of autistic people fire at a higher rate than normal, which leads to further motor disabilities, sensory issues, and additional autism traits. The team negated the original hypothesis of this theory, and instead proved that this imbalance is a compensatory effect, as opposed to the origin of autism. They found that the difference in the signals in the autism brains is of a type that stabilizes neurons’ firing rates rather than increasing them, which is suggestive of a compensatory response.

Antoine currently works at the NIAAA, where her lab studies normal brains versus diseased brains and brain circuit function from the lens of developmental disabilities such as autism spectrum disorder.
