= Fatima College =

Coordinates: 10.66674°N 61.53056°W

- Mucurapo Road; Port of Spain; Trinidad and Tobago

Information
- Type: Secondary School
- Motto: Nitendo Vinces ((By striving you shall conquer))
- Religious affiliation: Roman Catholic Church
- Established: 1945
- Principal: Shad Seaton
- Enrollment: 900 (Currently)
- Colors: Blue, Gold
- Website: fatimacollegeofficial.com

Fatima College is a government-assisted, Roman Catholic boys' secondary school in Port of Spain, Trinidad and Tobago. It was established in 1945 and had an enrollment of 895 students as of 2006. The school was established and is run by the Holy Ghost Fathers, an international Roman Catholic religious community.

== History ==
=== 1945 - 2009 ===
The College of Our Lady of Fatima began on the compound of St. Theresa's Intermediate School on 1 January 1945. The members of staff were Fr John Byrne, Michael McCarthy (prefect) and Andy Cockburn (a layman who is now a priest). The association with St Theresa's began with Parish Priest Fr Francis Flavin, OP. who first recognized the need for an additional Catholic college in North Trinidad. Work on the present site began in February under the supervision of Fr Byrne. In September 1945 classes shifted from St Theresa's, and on 1 December 1945, Archbishop Ryan formally blessed and opened this new College dedicated to our Lady of Fatima.

Fr Byrne retired in 1955 after overseeing the building of the Eastern and Western wings, the diversion of the Maraval River to accommodate the Assembly Hall, the construction of the chapel and three classrooms. Fr James Ryan succeeded him and developed the academic structures and systems of the College. In the 1960s, Fatima started participation in sports meeting, defeated C.I.C. to win its first InterCol final in 1965. Fr Gevias Girod joined Fatima in 1965, took charge of the Scouts and organized the first May Fair (or May Fayre) in 1966.

The 1970s, Fatima College transferred from clerical to lay control with the appointment of Clive Pantin as principal in 1972. Fr Farfan, local Holy Ghost Father, was appointed Vice Principal and these two individuals directed Fatima through the 1970s.

Clive Pantin retired in 1981, having served Fatima as Dean, Senior Dean, Senior Lay Master, Cricket and Football Coach, Vice Principal and Principal. He was succeeded by Mervyn Moore who joined the staff in 1959.

The nineties saw Bernard Tappin as Vice Principal in 1991 and Fr Gregory Augustine, a Fatima alumnus, as manager in 1992.

Sports include Football, Rugby, Swimming, Basketball, Table Tennis, Hockey, and Cricket.

Mr Garcia officially retired on 26 March 2009.

=== 2009 to present ===
While Mr. Garcia was on pre-retirement leave, the College's Manager, Fr Gregory Augustine was appointed to act as Principal on 5 January 2009.

In 2013, a New Wing was constructed to the North of the compound. This building now houses the Drama Room, the Art Room, the TD Room, the Fatima Old Boys' Association Office and 7 classrooms form students of Form 6.

In 2010, following the retirement of Mr. Harry Ramdass, Mr. Al Cooper assumed the role of Dean of Form 1. In 2012, following the death of Mr. Aloysious Joseph, Mr. Stefan de Gale was appointed as Dean of Form 5. In 2013, Mrs. Nirmala Bejai-Thompson replaced Mr. Michael Maharaj as Head of Department of Business.

In January, 2015, Mrs. Annie Gomes-Phillips was promoted to Principal of St. Benedict's College in San Fernando. Mrs. Gillian Ramdass, Dean of Form 4 then assumed the role of Vice Principal. Mr. Joel Greene was promoted to the office of Dean of Form 4. Following the retirement of Mrs. Rosemarie Duff at the end of the 2014-2015 academic year, Mr. Kwasi Noel replaced her as Dean of Form 6.

In the 2022-2023 Academic Year, Fr. Augustine Gregory stepped down as Principal, and Mr. Ronald Cooper was appointed as the new Acting Principal.

In the 2023-2024 Academic Year, the Deans of the school’s forms were rearranged. Mr. Stefan De Gale was appointed as the Form 1 Dean, Mr. Dale Brooks became the Form 3 Dean, Mr. Kwasi Noel was now the Form 4 Dean, Mr. Shad Seaton was the new Form 5 Dean and Mr. Joel Greene was appointed as Form 6 Dean.

On September 1st 2024, Mr. Ronald Cooper announced his retirement as Principal of the Secondary School. A new principal is yet to be announced, but is expected to be introduced at the beginning of the school’s 2024-2025 academic year.

== Notable alumni ==
- Sheldon Bateau - Professional Footballer
- Ato Boldon - Former Olympic sprinter
- George Bovell - Olympic swimmer
- Clive Bradley - Composer and Arranger of Steel pan music
- Darren Bravo - West Indies Cricketer
- Dylan Carter - Olympic Swimmer
- Etienne Charles - Jazz Trumpeter
- Everald Cummings - Former Professional Footballer and coach of the T&T Strike Squad
- Charles Jason Gordon- Metropolitan Archbishop of Port of Spain
- Brian Lara - Former West Indies Cricketer, Captain and multiple World Record holder
- Raoul Pantin – Journalist and playwright
- Darryl Roberts - Professional Footballer
- Kwamé Ryan - Musical Director, 2026 Grammy Award winner
- Anthony Smart - Former Attorney-General of Trinidad and Tobago and Member of Parliament
- Kevon Villaroel - Professional Footballer

== Sources ==
- Official website
