= Rho (protein) =

Rho protein may refer to:

- Rho GTPase, a member of Rho family of GTPases
- Rho factor, a bacterial protein involved in transcription termination
