= Clive Bradley (musician) =

Trinidadian musician

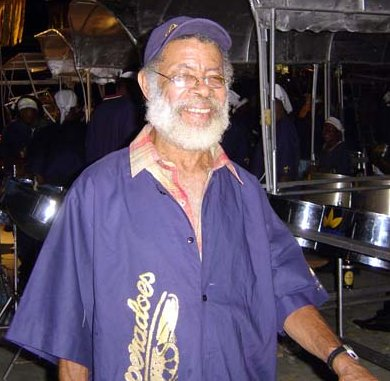
- Clive Bradley, 2005

Background information
- Born: 4 November 1936
- Origin: Trinidad
- Died: 26 November 2005 (aged 69)
- Genres: Calypso, Steelpan
- Occupation(s): Musician, arranger, teacher
- Years active: 1956–2005
- Formerly of: Desperadoes Steel Orchestra

Clive Bradley (4 November 1936 – 26 November 2005) was a known arranger of steelpan music.

== Person ==
Bradley grew up in Diego Martin, Trinidad, where he attended elementary school. He then went to Fatima College. He did not play steelpan himself, but in 1968 he was asked by Mr. Rudolph "Charlo" Charles, manager of the Desperadoes Steel Orchestra from Laventille to try his arranging talents for the band. Besides Mr. Bradley's 6 panorama arranging victories with Desperadoes, he led them to wins at Pan Fiesta in 2003 and 2005, and Pan in the 21st Century in 2005. Mr. Bradley is the only arranger to place 3 steel orchestras in the top-three at panorama in 3 decades. Desperadoes 1st in 1977, Pandemonium 2nd in 1988 and Nutones 3rd in 1999.

In 1973, Bradley founded an advertisement agency together with historian Gérard Besson. Bradley also was a teacher of mathematics at Fatima College and later on at the University of West Indies.

Clive Bradley also arranged for a number of steelbands from New York City. In 1999, he arranged the same song for two competitions and steelbands and won the Panorama title both in Port-of-Spain and New York. He repeated the same in the year 2000, won the Panorama title in Trinidad and came second in New York.

== Panorama ==
=== Panorama in Trinidad ===
Bradley won the Panorama competition in Trinidad seven times, six times with Desperadoes.

| Year | Song | Composer | Steelband |
|---|---|---|---|
| 1970 | "Margie" | Lord Kitchener | Desperadoes Steel Orchestra |
| 1976 | "Pan in Harmony" | Lord Kitchener | Desperadoes Steel Orchestra |
| 1977 | "Crawford" | Lord Kitchener | Desperadoes Steel Orchestra |
| 1983 | "Rebecca" | Blue Boy | Desperadoes Steel Orchestra |
1986 "Sugar for Pan" Mighty Terror Pandemonium Steel Orchestra
| 1998 | "High Mas" | David Rudder | Nutones Steel Orchestra |
| 1999 | "In My House" | Emmanuel Synette | Desperadoes Steel Orchestra |
| 2000 | "Picture on My Wall" | Emmanuel Synette | Desperadoes Steel Orchestra |

=== Panorama in New York ===
Over the years, Bradley took part with three steelbands in the New York Panorama, held during the West Indian Carnival Day. He won the competition ten times with two different groups:

| Year | Song | Composer | Steelband |
|---|---|---|---|
| 1982 | "Jenny" | Nelson | Metro Steel Orchestra |
| 1987 | "Say Say" | Baron | Metro Steel Orchestra |
| 1990 | "Tell Me Why" | Baron | Metro Steel Orchestra |
| 1991 | "This Melody Sweet" | Baron | Metro Steel Orchestra |
| 1992 | "Dingolay" | Shadow | Metro Steel Orchestra |
| 1999 | "In My House" | Emmanuel Synette | Pantonic Steel Orchestra |
| 2001 | "Stranger" | Shadow | Pantonic Steel Orchestra |
| 2002 | "Ben Lion" | Andre Tanker | Pantonic Steel Orchestra |
| 2003 | "Trini to the Bone" | David Rudder | Pantonic Steel Orchestra |
| 2005 | "Action" | Emmanuel Synette | Pantonic Steel Orchestra |
