= Frank Hercules =

Caribbean-American writer (1917–1996)

Frank Hercules (12 February 1917 – 6 May 1996) was a writer from Trinidad and Tobago. His work dealt with issues of racial and colonial oppression.

Hercules studied law in London before moving to Harlem; his family had immigrated into the United States where his father found asylum as an anti-colonial revolutionary.

== Books ==
=== Novels ===
- Where the Hummingbird Flies (1961)
- I Want a Black Doll (1967)
- On Leaving Paradise (1980)
- Sunrise at Midnight (posthumous)
- The Portuguese Earrings (unfinished)

=== Nonfiction ===
- American Society and the Black Revolution (1972)
