= Jit Samaroo =

Jit Sukha Samaroo (24 February 1950 – 7 January 2016) was a Trinidadian composer and steelpan musician.

== Life and work ==
Jit Samaroo was born in Surrey village, in Lopinot, Trinidad and Tobago, the seventh of 13 children in a family of Indian origin. At the age of 10, he joined the short-lived Village Boys pan-round-the-neck side. His mother, who loved playing the dholak, died in 1962, and so, young Jit, appointed the task of taking care of his younger siblings, formed the Samaroo kids combo.

They were initially Parang players but by the age of 14, already a self-confessed "slave to steelpan", Jit joined the Lever Brothers Canboulay Steelband. There he learned and mastered all the orchestra's instruments. Recognising young Jit's talent, the musical director Landeg White allowed him to help arrange the band's calypsos, and also arranged for him to have music lessons.

He was hailed as the country's most clinically accurate arranger, arranging one tune by the instrument and composing additional tunes to accompany it.

He was a versatile composer and occasional bass player in his family band the Samaroo Jets, Jit was awarded the Hummingbird Medal of Merit (Silver) in 1987, as well as the Chaconia Medal (silver) in 1995. In 2003, Samaroo was given an Honorary Doctorate from the University of the West Indies.

== Music ==
Victories with the Renegades Steel Orchestra.

Year	Song
1982	"Pan Explosion"
1984	"Sweet Pan"
1985	"Pan Night and Day"
1989	"Somebody"
1990	"Iron Man"
1993	"Mystery Band"
1995	"Four Lara Four"
1996	"Pan in a Rage"
1997	"Guitar Pan"

== Death ==
Professor Jit Samaroo died at his home on 7 January 2016. He was 65 years old.
