= Holy Name Preparatory =

Holy Name Preparatory School

Location
- 2 Queen's Park East; Port of Spain; Trinidad and Tobago
- Coordinates: 10.6634°N 61.5086°W

Information
- Type: Public
- Motto: Veratas
- Religious affiliation: Roman Catholic
- Established: 1962
- Principal: Sr. Stephanie Clemendor
- Gender: Mixed
- Enrollment: 600
- Website: www.holynameprep.org

Holy Name Preparatory School is a private primary school located in Port of Spain, Trinidad and Tobago. Originally associated with Holy Name Convent secondary school and Sacred Heart Boys, the school became an independent entity in 1965. It currently has around 600 students enrolled.

== Address ==
The School sits at #2 Queen's Park East, Opposite Memorial Park, between Holy Name Convent and the Port of Spain General Hospital.

== Administration ==
It is run by the Dominican Sisters.

== Notable alumni ==
- Keith Sobion (Former T&T Attorney General & Minister of Legal Affairs)
