= Desperadoes Steel Orchestra =

Trinidad steelband

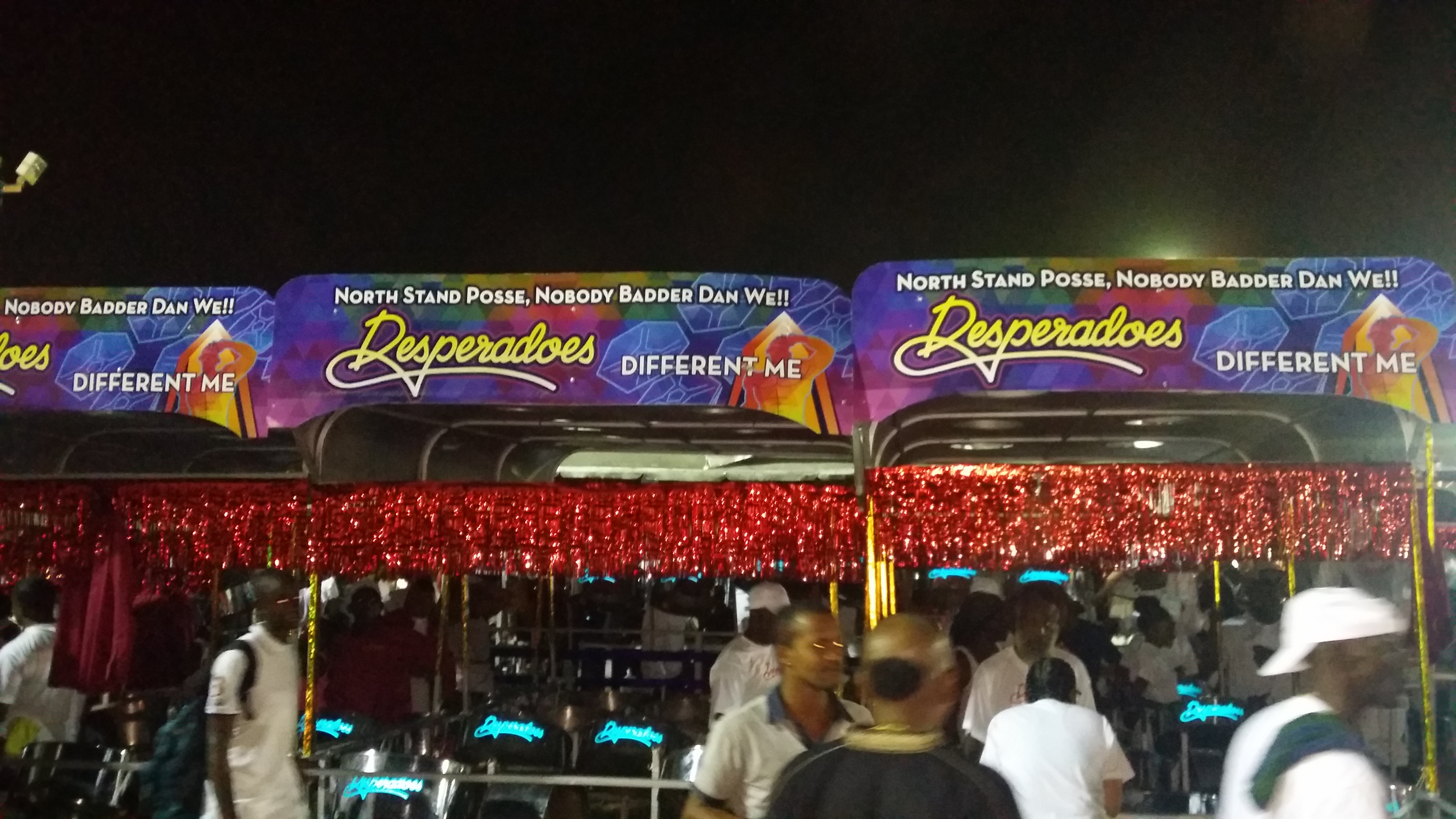

Background information
- Also known as: The Dead End, The Desperadoes, The Gay Desperadoes, The Coca-Cola Gay Desperadoes, The WITCO Desperadoes
- Origin: Laventille, Trinidad
- Genres: Steelpan; Trinidadian; Calypso
- Years active: 1945–present

The Desperadoes Steel Orchestra, also called Despers, are a steelband from Laventille in Trinidad, formed in 1945.

== Origins and evolution ==
In Port of Spain, Trinidad, in 1943, some young men who lived in the Laventille community began calling their group the Morocco/Dead End Kids, after some of them had seen a movie entitled "The Desperadoes" at the Royal Cinema on Charlotte Street. The name Desperadoes Steelband first came out at Carnival in 1947. There were several rival steelbands at the time: Sun Valley, Hill Sixty, the Crusaders, and Destination Tokyo. In the early 1950s, Wilfred "Speaker" Harrison and Donald "Jit" Steadman began bringing out the Mas Band. Later, this took a professional focus that saw the band sign a sponsorship deal with Coca-Cola in 1962. Thus, the band name changed to the Coca-Cola Gay Desperadoes.

In the 1950s another group of youths from Ovid Alley, Laventille, formed calling themselves Spike Jones. Ovid Alley was changed to Desperslie Crescent in the late 1970s. Then, the founders of Desperadoes said: "there can be only one steelband here", so the young Spike Jones group had no choice but to merge into Desperadoes. Rudolph "Charlo" Charles, who came from Spike Jones was given the captaincy in 1961, and he brought in Mr. Beverly Griffith as an arranger. Mr. Charles managed Desperadoes up to his passing in 1985. They band placed third in the first Panorama competition in 1963, 2nd in 1964. In 1965 the band's sponsor changed to the West Indian Tobacco Company, and they became the WITCO Gay Desperadoes. They won Panorama for the first time the in 1966, with a rendition of Mighty Sparrow's "Obeah Wedding". Charles recruited a few members away from other steelbands and transformed Desperadoes from a steelband into a STEEL ORCHESTRA. In later years he invited several pantuners such as Bertie Marshall to join. They dropped 'Gay' from the name in the 1970s. Under Rudolph Charles' leadership, the band won Panorama 6 times and Classical Music Festivals on 2 occasions. As of 2020, Desperadoes has 12 Panorama and 5 Classical victories.

The orchestra has made worldwide appearances and has performed at the Royal Albert Hall in 1972, Carnegie Hall in 1987, and performed with the Opera singer Luciano Pavarotti in Barbados in 1997.

The late Raymond "Artie" Shaw was the first musician to conduct Desperadoes Steel Orchestra at their performance for Queen Elizabeth at the Royal Albert Hall in London, and the late, Insp. Anthony Prospect conducted their English tour in 1981. The late Dr. Pat Bishop conducted their performance at Carnegie Hall in NYC. Desperadoes have also toured some of Trinidad & Tobago's motherlands; such as Africa, India, China, England and Grenada. The band has qualified for the most Panorama finals, 53 of 57 with {12} 1st, {6} 2nd and {9} 3rd. Desperadoes was a finalist for 36 consecutive years 1976 through 2011, has a winning average of (1) victory every 4.75 years as of 2020, has won every entered competition, and has a total of 21 combined MAJOR victories and 7 minor wins at various competitions, from 1965 to 2020.

In late May 2017, the band held elections, and Mr. Kenneth Collis was elected the 11th Manager since Mr. Rudolph Charles.

== Education ==
Despers also make an effort to educate their community in Laventille, and has hosted Pan Camps with up to 200 children participating. Besides playing steelpan, the program includes foreign language training, life skills and field trips.

== Competitions ==
=== Panorama ===
Despers have won the National Steelband Panorama competition of Trinidad and Tobago a total of twelve times in their history. Their most recent win took place in 2020, where they won with a total of 286 points.

The orchestra always takes part in the 'Large Band' category, with a minimum of one hundred musicians.

Maximum players allowed in the 'Large Band' category.

| CATEGORY | PRELIMS/SEMI-FINAL | FINAL |
|---|---|---|
| Large | 100 | 120 |

| Year | Song | Arranger |
|---|---|---|
| 1966 | "Obeah Wedding" | Beverly Griffith |
| 1970 | "Margie" | Clive Bradley |
| 1976 | "Pan in Harmony" | Clive Bradley |
| 1977 | "Crawford" | Clive Bradley |
| 1983 | "Rebecca" | Clive Bradley |
| 1985 | "Pan Night and Day" | B. Griffith & R. Greenidge |
| 1991 | "Musical Volcano" | Robert Greenidge |
| 1994 | "Fire Coming Down" | Robert Greenidge |
| 1999 | "In my House" | Clive Bradley |
| 2000 | "Picture on my Wall" | Clive Bradley |
| 2016 | "Different Me" | Carlton "Zanda" Alexander |
| 2020 | "More Sokah" | Carlton "Zanda" Alexander |

=== Music Festival ===
Desperadoes have won the (Pan Is Beautiful) Steel Orchestra Music Festival of Trinidad and Tobago three times. They played the "Polovetsian Dances" by Borodin in 1986, the "Marche Slave" from Tchaikovsky in 1988 and the "Bartered Bride" by Smetana in 1992. Their classical renditions were all arranged and conducted by the late, Dr. Pat Bishop. Desperadoes have also won The Best Village Classical Competition for pan in 1965. They performed "The Marriage of Figaro", which was arranged By Mr. Beverly Griffith. In 1967 they won The Champ of Champs Classical Competition. Their rendition of "Palaestra" and "The Merry Wives of Windsor" were arranged and conducted by the late Raymond "Artie" Shaw. Desperadoes Steel Orchestra has never lost a classical competition as a finalist.

== Discography ==
- Carnival In Trinidad (1965), RCA Victor - as Coca-Cola Gay Desperadoes Steel Orchestra
- Triple Winners (1966), Recording Artists - as The West Indian Tobacco Gay Desperadoes Steel Orchestra
- Caribbean Holiday (1966), Tropico/RCA - as Gay Desperadoes Steel Orchestra
- Steelband Fiesta (1967), Tropico - as The West Indian Tobacco Gay Desperadoes Steel Orchestra

"Steel + Brass = Gold" (1968) "Despers Classics Volume #1" (1969)

- Calypso Rock (1971), Despers Productions
- Classics With the Giants (197?), Bestway - as Gay Desperadoes Steel Orchestra, split with Solo Harmonites Steel Orchestra
- Desperadoes (1981), Charisma - as Desperadoes
- The Magical Music Of Despers (1991), Charlie's - as WITCO Gay Desperados
- The Jammer (1991)
- Live at Holder's, Barbados (1998)
- Steel in the Classics (1999), Rituals Music

Compilations

- The Best Of Despers (1977), Hildrina/Charlie's

== Sources ==
- Voices from the Hills: Despers & Laventille - The steelband and its effects on poverty, stigma & violence in a community, by Ancil Anthony Neil, 1987.
