= Phase II Pan Groove =

Steel band from Trinidad and Tobago

Phase II Pan Groove is a steel orchestra from Trinidad and Tobago.

== Band ==
Phase II Pan Groove was formed in August 1972 by a group of six musicians (Barry Howard, Rawle Mitchell, Andy Phillip, Selwyn Tarradath, Noel Seon and Len "Boogsie" Sharpe) seeking to produce a more creative sound on pan, by experimenting not only with different types of music, but also with the combined effects of contemporary instruments and pan.

These six musicians broke off from Starlift in order to become professional panmen. They bought some pans and, along with tuners Lennox Granger and Mikey Phillip, took up residence on Hamilton Street, Woodbrook, opposite the Tarradath residence.

Phase II remained an un-sponsored steel orchestra until 1999, when a sponsorship agreement was signed between the band and the oil company Petrotrin.

From its inception, Phase II Pan Groove performed original compositions in steelband competitions. At the national Panorama competitions, Phase II elected to perform pieces specifically composed and arranged for the instrument by its leader and musical director, "Boogsie."

Phase II, after an initial period of non-acceptance, gained some recognition as from 1977, when the band captured its first North Zonal title, and thereafter emerged as Champions of the North for a then unprecedented four consecutive years (1986–1989). The band eventually became the first un-sponsored band to win the national Panorama competition in 1987, as well as the first band to do so performing its own tune. This feat was repeated in 1988, and from that year to 1993, the band was in the top three positions except for 1991.

The band's arranger, Len Sharpe, was away in 1994 and 1995, but returned in 1996 and led the band to Panorama victories in 2005, 2006, 2008, 2013 and 2014. Phase II/Len Sharpe is the only team that qualified for all finals from 1981 to present and now has 7 wins, placed second 12 times and in third place four times.

At the Steelband Musical Festival, "Boogsie" has been dubbed the Mozart of Pan by foreign adjudicators, as his compositions have been able to stand alongside those of the great classical masters. At the Festival of 1986, the band captured third place, performing "Dance of the Douens" composed by "Boogsie".

Phase II has toured throughout North America, the Caribbean, Europe and Japan, and its musical director has toured around the world as a solo artist, sharing stages with some of the world's greatest jazz musicians.
