= Enrico Gratton =

Italian-American biophysicist

Enrico Gratton (born 1946) is an Italian-American biophysicist. His research is focused on the field of biophotonics and fluorescence spectroscopy.

== Early life and education ==
Enrico Gratton completed his graduate studies at the University of Rome, working on a physics thesis related to DNA molecules, chromosomes. From 1969 to 1971 he was a post-doctoral fellow at the Istituto Superiore di Sanità in Italy.

== Career ==
In 1978 Gratton worked as a postdoc with Gregorio Weber at the University of Illinois at Urbana-Champaign, studying protein dynamics. In 1978 he was appointed assistant professor in the Department of Physics at UIUC. In 1989 he was promoted to professor. At Illinois, Gratton established the Laboratory for Fluorescence Dynamics (LFD) in 1986 with long-term funding from the NIH, bringing advanced microscopy and spectroscopy techniques to the study of biological systems.

In 2006, Gratton retired from the University of Illinois and moved his laboratory to the University of California, Irvine, where he was made professor of Biomedical Engineering with joint appointments in biology and physics until his retirement in November of 2023.

=== Laboratory of Fluorescence Dynamics ===
In 1986, the National Institutes of Health awarded a grant to Gratton, to establish the Laboratory for Fluorescence Dynamics (LFD), the first national facility dedicated to fluorescence spectroscopy. The LFD is a fluorescence laboratory that serves local, national, and international scientists. The LFD gained international recognition for its development of instrumentation for time-resolved fluorescence spectroscopy using frequency domain methods.

At the LFD, scientists use fluorescence to study cellular processes, including protein aggregation, membrane interactions, and migration of cells, to track moving particles, and to analyze collagen formation and deformation.

== Research contributions ==
Phasor approach is a model-free analysis method used in fluorescence lifetime imaging to map cellular metabolism. This technique has been widely adopted for investigating cellular processes and protein dynamics.

Fluorescence Correlation Spectroscopy (FCS) is a technique used to measure the diffusion and interaction of fluorescently labeled molecules in solution.

Fluorescence Recovery After Photobleaching (FRAP) helps measure dynamics and mobility of molecules within complex biological systems.

Two-photon microscopy allows for noninvasive, three-dimensional imaging of live cells and tissues with reduced phototoxicity. This technology enables the study of cellular and tissue dynamics in intact, living organisms.

Fluorescence Lifetime Imaging (FLIM) is a technique that provides information about the local environment of fluorescent probes and can be used to study various biological parameters such as protein-protein interactions, pH, and ion concentrations.

== Awards and recognition ==
- Fellow of the American Physical Society
- Fellow of the Biophysical Society
- Fellow for The American Institute for Medical and Biological Engineering
- 2023 Recipient of an Honorary Doctorate from the University of the Republic in Uruguay.
- 2021 SPIE Britton Chance Biomedical Optics Award.
- 2019 BPS Avanti Award in Lipids (2019)
