= Lennox Sharpe =

Trinidad and Tobago musician (born 1953)

Lennox "Boogsie" Sharpe (born 28 October 1953 in Port of Spain, Trinidad and Tobago) is a successful and popular composer and arranger of steelpan music.

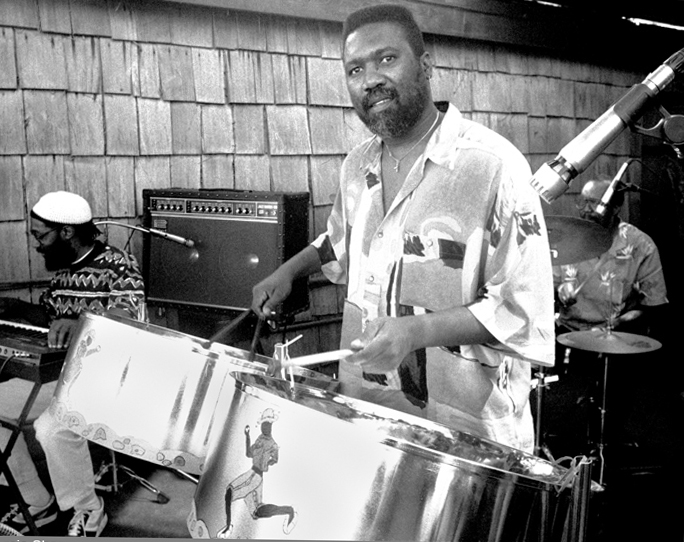
Sharpe at Bach Dancing & Dynamite Society, Half Moon Bay, CA, 1980s

== Biography ==
Sharpe began his career with Starlift steelband, where he worked as a co-arranger with Ray Holman. He is most strongly associated with the Phase II Pan Groove Steel Orchestra, a band he has taken to several finals of the Panorama steelband competition, as well as winning the first place in 1987 and 1988. Sharpe does not teach steelpan privately one-on-one; instead, he teaches it publicly at the panyard.

Sharpe started to play steelpan when he was just four years old. He used to play with the Invaders, then he went to Starlift, the steelband with which Ray Holman was taking the revolutionary step of composing music specifically for the instrument. Sharpe wanted to continue what Ray Holman had started by starting his own steelband in 1972.

In 2020, the University of the West Indies awarded Sharpe an Honorary Doctor of Letters for steelpan composition, arrangement, and performance.

Sharpe was married to the very talented Janet Hoating, an accomplished pianist who attended the St. Bartholomew's Music School under the tutorship of the late Amy Bartholomew.
