= Panorama (music competition) =

Annual music competition of steelbands

Panorama is an annual music competition of steelbands from Trinidad and Tobago, taking place since 1963. It is usually held around Carnival time.

== History ==
The first official Trinidad Panorama was held during Carnival celebrations in 1963. It was originally pioneered by Chairman of the Carnival Development Committee, Ronald Jay Williams, who gave the festival its name. Similarly styled "Panorama" steelband competitions are also staged at Carnival time in other Caribbean communities.

Typically, each steelpan orchestra plays a popular Calypso that is arranged into a piece with original introductions and variations.

As part of the International Conference on Pan (ICP) in August 2015, Trinidad hosted the International Panorama Competition. The international edition of Panorama was held over a two-day period, 8–9 August 2015. The competition brought together participants from the approximately 38 steelband-playing countries from around the world to compete against each other for the title of ICP Champions 2015.

In 1979, Panorama in Trinidad was not held due to Rudolph Charles' fight for higher recognition of pannists. The competition was again cancelled in 2021 and 2022 due to the COVID-19 pandemic.

It is held in Queen's Park Savannah, Port of Spain.

== Readings ==
- Felix I. R. Blake, The Trinidad and Tobago Steel Pan: History and Evolution, 1995. ISBN 0-9525528-0-9

== Past Winners ==
List of past winners in the category Large Band:

| Year | Steelband | Song | Composer | Arranger |
|---|---|---|---|---|
| 1963 | North Stars | "Dan Is the Man" | Mighty Sparrow | Anthony Williams |
| 1964 | North Stars | "Mama Dis Is Mas" | Lord Kitchener | Anthony Williams |
| 1965 | Cavaliers | "Melody Mas" | Lord Melody | Bobby Mohammed |
| 1966 | Desperadoes | "Obeah Wedding" | Mighty Sparrow | Beverly Griffith |
| 1967 | Cavaliers | "Sixty-Seven" | Lord Kitchener | Bobby Mohammed |
| 1968 | Harmonites | "Wrecker" | Lord Kitchener | Earl Rodney |
| 1969 | Starlift | "The Bull" | Lord Kitchener | Ray Holman |
| 1970 | Desperadoes | "Margie" | Lord Kitchener | Clive Bradley |
| 1971 | Harmonites | "Play Mas" | Lord Kitchener | Earl Rodney |
| 1972 | Harmonites | "St. Thomas Girl" | Lord Kitchener | Earl Rodney |
| 1973 | Trinidad All Stars | "Rainorama" | Lord Kitchener | Rudy Wells |
| 1974 | Harmonites | "Jericho" | Lord Kitchener | Rupert Mark |
| 1975 | Hatters | "Tribute to Spree Simon" | Lord Kitchener | Steve Achaiba |
| 1976 | Desperadoes | "Pan In Harmony" | Lord Kitchener | Clive Bradley |
| 1977 | Desperadoes | "Crawford" | Lord Kitchener | Clive Bradley |
| 1978 | Starlift | "Du Du Yemi" | Winston Devine | Herschel Puckerin |
| 1979 | No competition | | | |
| 1980 | Trinidad All Stars | "Woman on the Bass" | Scrunter | Leon "Smooth" Edwards |
| 1981 | Trinidad All Stars | "Unknown Band" | Blue Boy | Leon "Smooth" Edwards |
| 1982 | Renegades | "Pan Explosion" | Lord Kitchener | Jit Samaroo |
| 1983 | Desperadoes | "Rebecca" | Blue Boy | Clive Bradley |
| 1984 | Renegades | "Sweet Pan" | Lord Kitchener | Jit Samaroo |
| 1985 (Tie) | Renegades | "Pan Night and Day" | Lord Kitchener | Jit Samaroo |
| 1985 (Tie) | Desperadoes | "Pan Night and Day" | Lord Kitchener | Beverly Griffith |
| 1986 | Trinidad All Stars | "The Hammer" | David Rudder | Leon "Smooth" Edwards |
| 1987 | Phase II Pan Groove | "This Feelin' Nice" | Len "Boogsie" Sharpe | Len "Boogsie" Sharpe |
| 1988 | Phase II Pan Groove | "Woman is Boss" | Len "Boogsie" Sharpe | Len "Boogsie" Sharpe |
| 1989 | Renegades | "Somebody" | Winsford "Joker" Devine | Jit Samaroo |
| 1990 | Renegades | "Iron Man" | Lord Kitchener | Jit Samaroo |
| 1991 | Desperadoes | "Musical Volcano" | Robert Greenidge | Robert Greenidge |
| 1992 | Exodus | "Savannah Party" | Pelham Goddard | Pelham Goddard/Desmond Waithe |
| 1993 | Renegades | "Mystery Band" | Lord Kitchener | Jit Samaroo |
| 1994 | Desperadoes | "Fire Coming Down" | Robert Greenidge | Robert Greenidge |
| 1995 | Renegades | "Four Lara Four" | Merchant/DeFosto | Jit Samaroo |
| 1996 | Renegades | "Pan in a Rage" | DeFosto | Jit Samaroo |
| 1997 | Renegades | "Guitar Pan" | Lord Kitchener | Jit Samaroo |
| 1998 | Nutones | "High Mas" | David Rudder | Clive Bradley |
| 1999 | Desperadoes | "In My House" | Emanuel Synette | Clive Bradley |
| 2000 | Desperadoes | "Picture on My Wall" | Emanuel Synette | Clive Bradley |
| 2001 | Exodus | "Happy Song" | Pelham Goddard | Pelham Goddard |
| 2002 | Trinidad All Stars | "Fire Storm" | DeFosto | Leon "Smooth" Edwards |
| 2003 | Exodus | "Pandora" | DeFosto | Pelham Goddard |
| 2004 | Exodus | "War" | DeFosto | Pelham Goddard |
| 2005 | Phase II Pan Groove | "Trini Gone Wild" | Len "Boogsie" Sharpe | Len "Boogsie" Sharpe |
| 2006 | Phase II Pan Groove | "This One's 4u Bradley" | Len "Boogsie" Sharpe | Len "Boogsie" Sharpe |
| 2007 | Trinidad All Stars | "Pan Lamentation" | DeFosto | Leon "Smooth" Edwards |
| 2008 | Phase II Pan Groove | "Musical Vengeance" | Gregory Ballantyne | Len "Boogsie" Sharpe |
| 2009 | Silver Stars | "First in de Line" | Edwin Pouchet/Alvin Daniell | Edwin Pouchet |
| 2010 | Silver Stars | "Battle Zone" | Edwin Pouchet/Alvin Daniell | Edwin Pouchet |
| 2011 | Trinidad All Stars | "It's Showtime" | Edwin Pouchet/Alvin Daniell | Leon "Smooth" Edwards |
| 2012 | Trinidad All Stars | "Play Yourself" | Clive Telemaque | Leon "Smooth" Edwards |
| 2013 | Phase II Pan Groove | "More Love" | Black Stalin | Len "Boogsie" Sharpe |
| 2014 | Phase II Pan Groove | "Jump High" | Destra Garcia | Len "Boogsie" Sharpe |
| 2015 | Trinidad All Stars | "Unquestionable" | Sheldon Reid | Leon "Smooth" Edwards |
| 2016 | Desperadoes | "A Different Me" | "5Star" Akil Borneo | Carlton "Zanda" Alexander |
| 2017 | Trinidad All Stars | "Full Extreme" | Ultimate Rejects ft. MX Prime | Leon "Smooth" Edwards |
| 2018 | Renegades | "Year for Love" | Aaron "Voice" St Louis | Duvone Stewart |
| 2019 | Renegades | "Hookin' Meh" | N. Batson, E. George, M. Hulsmeier, S. Galt & D. Henry | Duvone Stewart |
| 2020 | Desperadoes | "More Sokah" | Nailah Blackman, Sekon Sta & Anson Soverall | Carlton “Zanda” Alexander |
| 2021 | No competition | | | |
| 2022 | No competition | | | |
| 2023 | Renegades | "Black Man Feeling to Party" | Black Stalin | Duvone Stewart |
| 2024 (Tie) | Renegades | "DNA" | Michel "Teja" Williams | Duvone Stewart |
| 2024 (Tie) | Trinidad All Stars | "Inventor" | Scott Galt | Leon "Smooth" Edwards |
| 2025 | Exodus | "Too Own Way" | Jason ‘Shaft’ Bishop, Scott Galt, Michael Hulsmeier | Terrance “BJ” Marcelle |
| 2026 | Exodus | "Cyah Behave" | Aaron ‘Voice’ St.Louis, Dwayne Mendes, Kerwin Du Bois | Terrance “BJ” Marcelle |
