= Hummingbird Medal =

- Type: Three class long and meritorious service decoration
- Awarded for: "...loyal and devoted service beneficial to the state in any field, or acts of conspicuous gallantry or other outstanding humane action."
- Presented by: Trinidad and Tobago
- Eligibility: Citizens, and foreign nationals
- Post-nominals: HBM
- Status: Currently awarded
- Established: 1969
- Final award: 2024
- Ribbon bar of the award

Precedence
- Next (higher): Chaconia Medal
- Next (lower): Public Service Medal of Merit

The Hummingbird Medal (abbreviated HBM or H.B.M.) is a state decoration of Trinidad and Tobago, instituted in 1969. The medal is awarded for loyal and devoted service beneficial to the state in any field, or acts of conspicuous gallantry or other outstanding humane action. There are three grades to the medal: bronze, silver and gold. Recipients of the medal are entitled to designate their names with the post-nominal letters "HBM".
